= List of aircraft (F) =

This is a list of aircraft in alphabetical order beginning with 'F'.

== Fa ==
=== FAB ===
(Flugwissenschaftliche Arbeitsgemeinschaft Bremen)

- ESS 641

=== FABE ===
(Fábrica Brasileira de Aeronaves, Ltda)

- FABE UT-23 Stol Tractor
- FABE EX-27 Bumerangue Cross Country
- FABE AG-21 Falcão Agrícola
- FABE AC-22 Falcão Treinador

=== Fabian ===
- Fabian Levente

=== Fabre ===
(Henry Fabre)

- Fabre Hydravion

=== Fabrica de Avioanes ===
see: SET

=== Fabrica de Galleao ===
- Niess 5FG
- PAR 8FG Guanabara

=== FAdA ===
(Fábrica Argentina de Aviones "Brigadier San Martín" S.A. formerly FMA) see: Fábrica Militar de Aviones

=== Fábrica Militar de Aviones ===
(Abbreviated FMA)

  - Ae. - "Dirección General de Aerotécnica" (1927–1936)
  - F.M.A. - for "Fábrica Militar de Aviones" (1938–1943)
  - I.Ae. - for "Instituto Aerotécnico" (1943–1952)
  - IA - meaning not specified (1952–2007)
  - FAdeA - Fábrica Argentina de Aviones "Brigadier San Martín" S.A.
- FMA I.Ae.20 El Boyero
- FMA I.Ae 24 Calquin
- FMA IAe 27 Pulqui I
- FMA IAe 30 Namcu
- FMA IAe 33 Pulqui II
- FMA IAe 35 Huanquero
- FMA IAe 38
- FMA IAe 45 Quarandi
- FMA IA 58 Pucará
- FMA IA-59
- FMA IA 63 Pampa
- FMA SAIA 90
- FMA ATL
- FAdeA IA 100

=== Fachschule für Ultraleicht und Motorflug ===
(Fachschule für Ultraleicht- und Motorflug GmbH (FUL), Hörselberg-Hainich, Thuringia, Germany)

- FUL MA 30 Graffiti

=== FAG Chemnitz ===
(Flugtechnischen Arbeitsgemeinschaft der Staatlichen Akademie für Technik - Chemnitz)

- FAG Chemnitz C-1
- FAG Chemnitz C-2
- FAG Chemnitz C-3
- FAG Chemnitz C-4
- FAG Chemnitz C-5
- FAG Chemnitz C-6
- FAG Chemnitz C-7
- FAG Chemnitz C-8
- FAG Chemnitz C-9
- FAG Chemnitz C10
- FAG Chemnitz C-11

=== Fliegende ===
- Fliegende Panzerfaust

=== FAG Hamburg ===
(Flugtechnische Arbeitgemeinschaft an der H.T.L. Hamburg)

- FAG Hamburg Werk Nr.1
- FAG Hamburg Kobold
- FAG Hamburg Brummer

=== FAG Stettin ===
(Flugtechnische Arbeitgemeinschaft an der H.T.L. Stettin)

- FAG Stettin 4
- FAG Stettin La 11

=== Fairchild ===
(Walter L Fairchild, Mineola, NY)

- Fairchild 1910 Monoplane

=== Fairchild ===
(founded 1925 as Fairchild, Fairchild-Hiller, Fairchild-Republic, Fairchild-Swearingen, bankrupt 2002 as Fairchild Dornier)

- Fairchild-Republic A-10 Thunderbolt II
- Fairchild AT-13 Gunner
- Fairchild AT-14 Gunner
- Fairchild AT-21 Gunner
- Fairchild BQ-3
- Fairchild C-8
- Fairchild C-24
- Fairchild C-26 Metroliner
- Fairchild C-31
- Fairchild C-61 Forwarder
- Fairchild C-82 Packet
- Fairchild C-86 Forwarder
- Fairchild C-88
- Fairchild C-96
- Fairchild C-119 Flying Boxcar
- Fairchild AC-119 Shadow/Stinger
- Fairchild C-120 Packplane
- Fairchild C-123 Provider
- Fairchild C-128 Flying Boxcar
- Fairchild C-138
- Fairchild XC-941
- Fairchild F-1
- Fairchild GK
- Fairchild JK
- Fairchild J2K
- Fairchild JQ
- Fairchild J2Q
- Fairchild NQ
- Fairchild PT-19
- Fairchild PT-23
- Fairchild PT-26
- Fairchild R2K
- Fairchild RQ
- Fairchild R2Q
- Fairchild R4Q
- Fairchild SBF
- Fairchild SOK
- Fairchild T-31
- Fairchild-Republic T-46A Eaglet
- Fairchild-Hiller AU-23 Peacemaker
- Fairchild VZ-5
- Fairchild 21
- Fairchild 22
- Fairchild 24
- Fairchild 41
- Fairchild 42 Foursome
- Fairchild 45
- Fairchild 45-80 Sekani
- Fairchild 46-A
- Fairchild 51
- Fairchild 71
- Fairchild 72
- Fairchild 81
- Fairchild 82
- Fairchild 91 (A-942-A) Baby Clipper
- Fairchild 91B (A-942-B) Jungle Clipper
- Fairchild 95
- Fairchild 100
- Fairchild 135
- Fairchild 140
- Fairchild 150
- Fairchild Dornier 228
- Fairchild Dornier 328
- Fairchild Dornier 328JET
- Fairchild Dornier 728 family
  - a single 728 prototype was built but never flew
  - Fairchild Dornier, prior to its April 2002 bankruptcy, envisioned 528, 928, and 1128 variants
- Fairchild Argus
- Fairchild Cornell PT-26 RCAF name
- Fairchild F-11
- Fairchild F-27
- Fairchild F-47
- Fairchild FB-3
- Fairchild FC-1
- Fairchild FC-2
- Fairchild-Hiller FH-227
- Fairchild FT-1
- Fairchild KR-21
- Fairchild KR-31
- Fairchild KR-34
- Fairchild KR-125
- Fairchild KR-135
- Fairchild LXF1
- Fairchild M-62
- Fairchild M-84
- Fairchild M-92
- Fairchild M-186
- Fairchild M-224
- Fairchild M-232
- Fairchild-Swearingen Merlin
- Fairchild-Swearingen Metro
- Fairchild-Swearingen Metroliner
- Fairchild-Hiller FH-1100
- Fairchild-Hiller PC-6 Porter
- Fairchild Super 71
- Fairchild LXF
- Fairchild Navy Experimental Type F Amphibious Transport

=== Fairey Aviation Company ===
(For the Belgian component see Avions Fairey)

- Fairey III
- Fairey Albacore
- Fairey Atalanta (aircraft)
- Fairey Barracuda
- Fairey Battle
- Fairey Campania
- Fairey F.2
- Fairey Fantome
- Fairey Fawn
- Fairey FC1
- Fairey FD1
- Fairey FD2
- Fairey Feroce
- Fairey Ferret
- Fairey Firefly
- Fairey Firefly I
- Fairey Firefly II
- Fairey Fleetwing
- Fairey Flycatcher
- Fairey Fox
- Fairey Fremantle
- Fairey Fulmar
- Fairey G.4/31
- Fairey Gannet
- Fairey Gannet AEW.3
- Fairey Gannet AEW.7
- Fairey Gordon
- Fairey FB-1 Gyrodyne
- Fairey Hamble Baby
- Fairey Hendon
- Fairey Jet Gyrodyne
- Fairey Kangourou
- Fairey Long-range Monoplane
- Fairey N.4
- Fairey N.9
- Fairey N.10
- Fairey Pintail
- Fairey Primer
- Fairey Rotodyne
- Fairey S.9/30
- Fairey Seafox
- Fairey Seal
- Fairey Spearfish
- Fairey Swordfish
- Fairey T.S.R.1
- Fairey Titania
- Fairey Ultra-light Helicopter

=== Fairtravel ===
- Fairtravel Linnet

=== Fajr ===
(Fajr Aviation & Composites Industry)

- Fajr F.3 ( Cirrus SR-20 copy/modification)
- Fajr Faez (Colomban Cri-Cri copy)
- Fajr F.20

=== Falck ===
(William Falck, Warwick, NY)

- Falck Chester Special
- Falck Special

=== Falcomposite ===
- Falcomposite Furio

=== Falcon ===
(Falcon Racers Inc.)

- Falcon Special
- Falcon Special II

=== Falconar ===
((Chris) Falconar Avia Ltd, Edmonton, Canada)

- Falconar Teal
- Falconar AMF-Super 14D Maranda
- Falconar AMF-14H Maranda
- Falconar Cub Major
- Falconar Majorette
- Falconar F9A
- Falconar F10A
- Falconar F11A Sporty
- Falconar F11E Sporty
- Falconar F12A Cruiser
- Falconar ARV-1K Golden Hawk
- Falconar ARV-1L Golden Hawk
- Falconar Master X
- Falconar Minihawk
- Falconar SAL Mustang
- Falconar Turbi D5

=== FAMA ===
(Fábrica Argentina de Materiales Aerospaciales)

- FAMA IA 58 Pucará
- FAMA IA 58C Pucará Charlie
- FAMA IA 66 Pucará
- FMA IA 70
- Embraer/FMA CBA 123 Vector (CBA - Cooperación Brasil-Argentina (Spanish), and Cooperação Brasil-Argentina (Portuguese)
- FAMA IA 63 Pampa

=== Famà ===
(Famà Helicopters srl)

- Famà Kiss 209

=== Fanaero-Chile ===
- Fanaero-Chile Chincol

=== Fane ===
- Fane F.1/40

=== Fantasy Air ===
- Fantasy Air Allegro
- Jora Jora

=== Faradair ===
(Faradair Aerospace)

- Faradair Aerospace BEHA

=== Faria ===
(Lawrence Faria, Richmond, OH)

- Faria Sport

=== Farina ===
(Farina Aircraft Corp, 690 8 Ave, New York, NY)

- Farina 1930 Aeroplane

=== Farman Aviation Works ===
(Société Anonyme des Usines Farman (S.A.U.F.) / Société Henry and Maurice Farman) (Dick, Maurice and Henry Farman)

==== Maurice Farman ====
- Maurice Farman MF.1
- Maurice Farman MF.2
- Maurice Farman MF.5
- Maurice Farman MF.6
- Maurice Farman MF.6bis
- Maurice Farman MF.7 Longhorn
- Maurice Farman MF.8
- Maurice Farman MF.9
- Maurice Farman MF.11 Shorthorn
- Maurice Farman MF.12
- Maurice Farman MF.16
- Maurice Farman Coupe Michelin
- Maurice Farman Hydro-Aeroplane I
- Maurice Farman Hydro-Aeroplane II

==== Henry Farman ====
- Henry Farman III; also known as the Henry Farman 1909 Biplane
- Henry Farman HFC
- Henry Farman HFC-1
- Henry Farman HF.1
- Henry Farman HF.1bis
- Henry Farman HF.2/2
- Henry Farman HF.6
- Henry Farman HF.7
- Henry Farman HF.10
- Henry Farman HF.10bis
- Henry Farman HF.11
- Henry Farman HF.11 hydroplane
- Henry Farman HF.12
- Henry Farman HF.14
- Henry Farman HF.14 hydroplane
- Henry Farman HF.15
- Henry Farman HF.16
- Henry Farman HF.17
- Henry Farman HF.18 hydroplane
- Henry Farman HF.19 hydroplane
- Henry Farman HF.20
- Henry Farman HF.21
- Henry Farman HF.22
- Henry Farman HF.23
- Henry Farman HF.24
- Henry Farman HF.25
- Henry Farman HF.27
- Henry Farman HF.30
- Henry Farman HF.31
- Henry Farman HF.33
- Henry Farman HF.35
- Henry Farman HF.36
- Henry Farman HF.206

==== Farman ====
- Farman Aviette
- Farman Blanchard built by Farman to a design by Maurice Blanchard, 1921
- Farman BN.4 Super Goliath four-engined bomber 1921
- Farman Moustique
- Farman FF 65 Sport
- Farman F.1,40
- Farman F.1,40bis
- Farman F.1,40ter
- Farman F.1,41 (aka Army Type 70)
- Farman F.1,41bis
- Farman F.1,41 H
- Farman F.1,46
- Farman F.2,41
- Farman F-3bis
- Farman F-3X Jabiru original designation of the F.121 Jabiru
- Farman F-4S four-engine transport biplane
- Farman F.4X original designation of the F.120
- Farman F.21
- Farman F.30
- Farman F.31
- Farman F.40
- Farman F.40 H
- Farman F.40bis
- Farman F.40ter
- Farman F.40 QC
- Farman F.40 P
- Farman F.41
- Farman F.41 H
- Farman F.41bis
- Farman F.41bis H
- Farman F.43 (1915-1918) - reconnaissance
- Farman F.45 two-seat reconnaissance sesquiplane
- Farman F.46 two-seat biplane trainer
- Farman F.47 two-seat reconnaissance biplane
- Farman F.48 two-seat reconnaissance biplane
- Farman F.49 two-seat reconnaissance biplane
- Farman F.50 (1918)
- Farman F.50 (flying boat)
- Farman F.51
- Farman F.60 Goliath: Civil passenger transport version, powered by two 260-hp (194-kW) Salmson CM.9 radial piston engines.
  - Farman FF.60: Designation of the first three prototype F.60 airliners.
  - Farman F.60bis: This designation was given to transport version, powered by two 300 hp (224 kW) Salmson 9Az engines.
  - Farman F.60 Bn.2: Three-seat night bomber evolved from the F.60 Goliath. It was equipped with two 260 hp Salmson 9Zm engines, and 210 were delivered to French naval and army aviation.
  - Farman F.60 Torp: Torpedo-bomber floatplane, powered by two Gnome-Rhone Jupiter radial piston engines.
  - Farman F.60M: Blunt-nose version of 1924, powered by two 310 hp (231 kW) Renault 12Fy engines.
  - Farman F.61: An F.60 equipped with two 300 hp (224 kW) Renault 12Fe engines, which gave it better performance. Only two were built.
  - Farman F.62 BN.4: Export version for the Soviet Union, powered by two 450 hp (336 kW) Lorraine-Dietrich V-12 engines.
  - Farman F.63 BN.4: Similar to the F.62 BN.4 export version, powered by two 450 hp (336 kW) Gnome-Rhone Jupiter radial piston engines.
  - Farman F.65: This version was built for the French Navy, it could be fitted with interchangeable float or landing gear.
  - Farman F.66 BN.3: One Jupiter-powered aircraft was built, intended to be exported to Romania.
  - Farman F.68 BN.4: Thirty-two Jupiter-powered bomber aircraft exported to Poland.
- Farman F.70
- Farman F.71
- Farman F.72
- Farman F.73
- Farman F.74
- Farman F.75
- Farman F.76
- Farman F.80
- Farman F.81 two-seat trainer/school biplane
- Farman F.85 EP2 biplane trainer
- Farman F.85 ET2 two-seat biplane trainer
- Farman F.90
- Farman F.91
- Farman F.110
- Farman F.115
- Farman F.120 single-engine bomber and trimotor airliner
- Farman F.121 Jabiru
- Farman F.122
- Farman F.123
- Farman F.124
- Farman F.130
- Farman F.130-T
- Farman F.140 Super Goliath: Super-heavy bomber prototype, powered by four 500 hp (373 kW) Farman engines in tandem pairs.
- Farman F.141 Super Goliath
- Farman F.150
- Farman F.150bis
- Farman F.160
- Farman F.160 A.2
- Farman F.160 BN.4
- Farman F.161
- Farman F.162
- Farman F.163
- Farman F.165
- Farman F.166
- Farman F.167
- Farman F.168
- Farman F.169
- Farman F.170 Jabiru
- Farman F.171
- Farman F.180 Oiseau bleu (Blue Bird)
- Farman F.180-T Oiseau bleu with new, longer fuselage
- Farman F.190
- Farman F.191
- Farman F.192
- Farman F.193
- Farman F.194
- Farman F.195 three-seat, high-wing reconnaissance monoplane
- Farman F.196 three-seat cabin monoplane
- Farman F.197
- Farman F.198
- Farman F.199
- Farman F.200 (1923)
- Farman F.200
- Farman F.201
- Farman F.202
- Farman F.203
- Farman F.204
- Farman F.205
- Farman F.206
- Farman F.209
- Farman F.211
- Farman F.212
- Farman F.220
- Farman F.221
- Farman F.222
- Farman F.223 later SNCAC NC.223
- Farman F.230
- Farman F.231
- Farman F.232
- Farman F.233
- Farman F.234
- Farman F.235
- Farman F.236
- Farman F.238
- Farman F.239
- Farman F.250
- Farman F.268
- Farman F.269
- Farman F.270
- Farman F.271
- Farman F.280
- Farman F.281
- Farman F.282
- Farman F.290
- Farman F.291 five-seat transport aircraft
- Farman F.291/1 five-seat transport aircraft
- Farman F.293 five-seat transport aircraft
- Farman F.300
- Farman F.301
- Farman F.302
- Farman F.303
- Farman F.304
- Farman F.305
- Farman F.306
- Farman F.310
- Farman F.350
- Farman F.351
- Farman F.352
- Farman F.353
- Farman F.354
- Farman F.355
- Farman F.356
- Farman F.357
- Farman F.358
- Farman F.359
- Farman F.360
- Farman F.361
- Farman F.368
- Farman F.370
- Farman F.380
- Farman F.390
- Farman F.391
- Farman F.392
- Farman F.393
- Farman F.400
- Farman F.401
- Farman F.402
- Farman F.403
- Farman F.404
- Farman F.405
- Farman F.406
- Farman F.410
- Farman F.420
- Farman F.430
- Farman F.431
- Farman F.432
- Farman F.433
- Farman F.450
- Farman F.451
- Farman F.455
- Farman F.460 Alizé
- Farman F.480 Alizé
- Farman F.500 Monitor I
- Farman F.510 Monitor II
- Farman F.520 Monitor III
- Farman F.521 Monitor III
- Farman F.1000
- Farman F.1001
- Farman F.1002
- Farman F.1010
- Farman F.1020
- Farman F.1021
- Farman NC.223
- Farman NC.410 renamed SNCAC NC.4-10
- Farman NC.433
- Farman NC.470
- Farman NC.471

=== Farman-Standard ===
(Farman-Standard Corp.)

- Farman-Standard D-25A

=== Farnborough ===
(Farnborough Aircraft / Richard noble)

- Farnborough F1 Kestrel

=== Farner ===
(Willi Farner / Farner-Werke AG / F+W)

- Farner WF.12
- Farner WF.21/C4
- F+W C-3605

=== Farnham ===
(Lawrence Farnham, Fort Collins, CO)

- Farnham FC-1 Fly-Cycle

=== Farrington ===
(Farrington Aircraft Corp, Paducah, KY)

- Farrington Twinstar
- Farrington 18A

=== Fasig-Turner ===
(Charles P Fasig & Charles Turner)

- Fasig-Turner 1924 Biplane

=== FASTec ===
(Advanced Technology Products Inc, Worcester, MA)

- FASTec Electra-plane

=== Faucett ===
(Cia. de Aviacion Faucett)

- Faucett F-19

=== Faust ===
(Elmer Faust, dba Cody Aero Services, Cody, WY)

- Faust 3 (a.k.a. Faust 301 and Faust PA-12)

=== Fauvel ===
- Fauvel AV.1
- Fauvel AV.2
- Fauvel AV.3
- Fauvel AV.7
- Fauvel AV.10
- Fauvel AV.14
- Fauvel AV.17
- Fauvel AV.22, 221 and 222
- Fauvel AV.28
- Fauvel AV.29
- Fauvel AV.31
- Fauvel AV.36 and 361
- Fauvel AV.42
- Fauvel AV.44
- Fauvel AV.45 and 451
- Fauvel AV.46
- Fauvel AV.48
- Fauvel AV.60
- Fauvel AV.61

=== Fawcett ===
- Fawcett 120

== Fb ==
=== FBA ===
(Franco British Aviation / Hydravions Schreck-F.B.A.)

- FBA Type A
- FBA Type B
- FBA Type C
- FBA Type D (Avion Canon)
- FBA Type H
- FBA Type S
- FBA 10
- FBA 11
- FBA 13
- FBA 14
- FBA 16
- FBA 17
- FBA 19
- FBA 21
- FBA 23
- FBA 270
- FBA 290
- FBA 310
- FBA Avion Canon
- FBA 1 Ca2
- FBA triplane flying boat

== Fd ==
=== FD-Composites ===
(FD-Composites, Arbing, Austria)

- FD-Composites Arrow Copter AC 10
- FD-Composites Arrow Copter AC 20

== Fe ==
=== Federal ===
(Federal Aircraft & Motor Corp, New York, NY)

- Federal Army Tractor

=== Federal ===
(Federal Aircraft Corp, San Bernardino, CA)

- Federal CM-1 Lone Eagle
- Federal CM-2 a.k.a. (General Pilot)
- Federal CM-3
- Federal XPT-1

=== Federal ===
(Federal Aircraft Ltd, Montreal Canada)

- Federal AT-20

=== Fedorov ===
(D. D. Fedorov)

- Fedorov DF-1

=== Fefolov ===
(Igor Fefolov)

- Fefolov F-1
- Fefolov F-3
- Fefolov F-5
- Fefolov F-7

=== Feiro ===
(Feigl & Lajos Rotter)

- Feiro I
- Feiro Dongo
- Feiro Daru

=== Felio ===
(Harold G Felio, Los Angeles, CA)

- Felio Ranger SP-2

=== Felix ===
(Charles Felix, Hatfield, PA)

- Felix A

=== Felixstowe ===
- Felixstowe Porte Baby
- Felixstowe Porte Super Baby
- Felixstowe F.1
- Felixstowe F.2
- Felixstowe F.3
- Felixstowe F.5
- Felixstowe Fury

=== Fellabaum ===
(J R Fellabaum, Toledo, OH)

- Fellabaum JRF-22 Starfire

=== Fellot-Lacour ===
(Fellot-Lacour)

- Fellot-Lacour FL.4

=== Fernas ===
- Fernas 142

=== Feniks OKB ===
- Feniks Kamatik

=== Ferber ===
(Ferdinand Ferber)

- Ferber I
- Ferber II
- Ferber III
- Ferber IV
- Ferber V
- Ferber VI
- Ferber VII
- Ferber VIII
- Ferber IX

=== Féré ===
(René Féré)

- Féré F.3

=== Fernic ===
((George B) Fernic Aircraft Corp, 3493 Richmond Terrace, Staten Island, NY)

- Fernic T-9 (a.k.a. FT-1X and FT-9)
- Fernic T-10 Cruisaire

=== Ferrière ===
(Louis Ferrière)

- Ferrière LF.02
- Ferrière LF.03

=== Fetterman ===
((Fred O) Fetterman Aircraft Corp, Brooklyn, NY)

- Fetterman Chick-a-dee

=== Fetters ===
(Arthur Haldane Fetters)

- Fetters 1921 Sport biplane

=== Feugray ===
(Gérard Feugray)

- Feugray TR-200
- Feugray TR-260
- Feugray TR-300
- Feugray TR-3250
- Feugray-Fordan ASA-200
- Feugray-Fordan ASA-260

== Ff ==
=== FFA ===
(Flug- und Fahrzeugwerke Altenrhein / Federal Institute of Technology – (Eidgenössische Technische Hochschule Zürich))

- FFA AS-202 Bravo
- FFA D-3800
- FFA N.20 Aiguillon
- FFA N.20.1 Arbalete
- FFA N.20.2 Arbalete Glider
- FFA P-16
- FFA Diamant
- FFA Ka-Bi-Vo

=== FFT ===
(FFT GESELLSCHAFTFUR FLUGZEUG- UND FASERVERBUND-TECHNOLOGIE mbH)

- FFT SC01 Speed Canard
- FFT Eurotrainer 2000

=== FFV Aerotech ===
- FFV Aerotech BA-14 Starling

=== FFVS ===
(Kungliga Flygförvaltningens Flygverkstad i Stockholm - Royal Air Administration Aircraft Factory in Stockholm)

- FFVS J.22

== Fg ==
=== FGP ===
- FGP 227

== Fi ==
=== Fiat Aviazione ===
(Fabbrica Italiana Automobili Torino - Italian Automobile Factory of Turin)

- Fiat A.120
- Fiat AN.1
- Fiat APR.2
- Fiat ARF (Aeroplano-Rosatelli-Fiat)
- Fiat AS.1
- Fiat AS.2
- Fiat BGA
- Fiat BR
- Fiat BR.1
- Fiat BR.2
- Fiat BR.3
- Fiat BR.4
- Fiat BR.20 Cicogna
- Fiat BRG (Bombardiere Rosatelli Gigante - Giant Rosatelli Bomber)
- Fiat C.29
- Fiat CR.1
- Fiat CR.2
- Fiat CR.5
- Fiat CR.10
- Fiat CR.10 Idro
- Fiat CR.20
- Fiat CR.20 Idro
- Fiat CR.23
- Fiat CR.25
- Fiat CR.30
- Fiat CR.32
- Fiat CR.33
- Fiat CR.40
- Fiat CR.41
- Fiat CR.42
- Fiat G.2
- Fiat G.5
- Fiat G.8
- Fiat G.12
- Fiat G.18
- Fiat G.26
- Fiat G.46
- Fiat G.49
- Fiat G.50 Freccia
- Fiat G.51
- Fiat G.52
- Fiat G.55 Centauro
- Fiat G.56
- Fiat G.57
- Fiat G.59
- Fiat G.80
- Fiat G.82
- Fiat G.91
- Fiat G.212
- Fiat G.218
- Fiat G.222
- Fiat R.2
- Fiat R.22
- Fiat R.700
- Fiat TR.1
- Fiat 7002 Helicopter
- Fiat MM.1
- Fiat MM.2

=== FIAT-CMASA ===
(Fabbrica Italiana Automobili Torino - Costruzioni Meccaniche Aeronautiche S.A.)

- Fiat MF.4
- Fiat MF.5
- Fiat MF.6
- Fiat MF.10
- Fiat AS.14
- Fiat RS.14
- Fiat CS.15

=== FIAT-CANSA ===
(Fabbrica Italiana Automobili Torino - Costruzioni Aeronautiche Novaresi S.A.)

- FIAT-CANSA FC.11
- FIAT-CANSA FC.12
- FIAT-CANSA FC.20

=== Fiberdyne ===
(Fiberdyne Associates Inc, West Chester, PA)

- Fiberdyne XRG-165A Glaticopter

=== Fiedor ===
(Ludwick Fiedor, Cleveland, OH)

- Fiedor Bluewing

=== Field ===
(Raymond Field, 208 N Erie St, Wichita, KS)

- Field Midwing

=== Field ===
(K G Field, State Market, Seattle, WA)

- Field A

=== Fieseler ===
(Gerhard Fieseler Werke GmbH)

- Fieseler F 1 Tigerschwalbe two-seat biplane trainer
- Fieseler F 2 Tiger single-seat acrobatic biplane
- Fieseler F 3 Wespe, experimental delta-wing aircraft
- Fieseler F 4 two-seat sports/travel aircraft
- Fieseler F 6 two-seat trainer/sports plane
- Fieseler Fi 5 acrobatic sports plane/trainer; previously F 5
- Fieseler Fi 97 competition/touring monoplane
- Fieseler Fi 98 prototype biplane dive bomber; lost to the Hs 123
- Fieseler Fi 99 Jungtiger, prototype sports aircraft
- Fieseler Fi 103 RLM designation for the V-1
- Fieseler Fi 103R Reichenberg manned version of the V-1
- Fieseler Fi 156 Storch liaison aircraft
- Fieseler Fi 157 unmanned anti-aircraft drone
- Fieseler Fi 158 research aircraft; manned version of Fi 157
- Fieseler Fi 166 vertical-launched fighter project
- Fieseler Fi 167 torpedo/reconnaissance bomber
- Fieseler Fi 168 ground attack aircraft project
- Fieseler Fi 253 Spatz (Sparrow), light civilian aircraft
- Fieseler Fi 256 enlarged version of Fi 156
- Fieseler Fi 333 prototype transport aircraft

=== Fife ===
(Ray Fife, Coronado, CA)

- Fife-Beachey Beachey replica

=== Fike ===
(William J Fike, Anchorage AK and Salt Lake City, UT)

- Fike Model A
- Fike Model B
- Fike Model C
- Fike Model D
- Fike Model E
- Fike Model F

=== Filper ===
(Filper Research Corp, San Ramon and Livermore, CA)

- Filper Helicopter (N9712C)
- Fliper test rig
- Filper Beta 200
- Filper Beta 200A (N5000F)
- Filper Beta 300
- Filper Beta 400
- Filper Beta 400A (N5003F)

=== Finklea ===
(Finklea Brothers, Leland, MS)

- Finklea FT-1 Trainer
- Finklea Model 1933

=== Firebird ===
(Bitburg, Germany)

- Firebird Choice Zip Bi
- Firebird Debute
- Firebird Grid
- Firebird Hornet
- Firebird Sub-One
- Firebird Tribute
- Firebird Z-One

=== Firestone ===
(1940: G&A (Gliders & Aircraft) Div, Firestone Tire & Rubber Co, Willow Grove, PA 1946: Firestone Aircraft Div on acquisition of Pitcairn-Larsen Autogiros.)

- Firestone H-9
- Firestone H-14
- Firestone H-19
- Firestone XR-9
- Firestone XR-14
- Firestone Model GA-45
- Firestone Model GA-50

=== Firecatcher ===
(Firecatcher Aircraft)

- Firecatcher F-45

=== First Strike ===
(First Strike Aviation Inc (pres: Bobby Baker), Pigott, AR)

- First Strike Bobcat
- First Strike Super Cat

=== Fisher ===
(Fisher Aero Corporation)

- Fisher Culite
- Fisher Flyer
- Fisher Barnstormer
- Fisher Boomerang
- Fisher Culex
- Fisher Mariah
- Fisher FP-101
- Fisher FP-202 Koala
- Fisher FP-303
- Fisher Super Koala
- Fisher FP-404
- Fisher FP-505 Skeeter
- Fisher FP-606 Sky Baby
- Fisher Classic
- Fisher Celebrity
- Fisher Horizon 1
- Fisher Horizon 2
- Fisher Dakota Hawk
- Fisher Avenger
- Fisher R-80 Tiger Moth
- Fisher Youngster

=== Fisher ===
(Fisher Body Works, Cleveland, OH)

- Fisher-Caproni Ca.46 (license built Caproni Ca.46)
- Fisher-de Havilland DH-4 (license built Airco DH-4)
- Fisher-Standard SJ-1 (license built Standard SJ-1)

=== Fisher ===
(Edward Fisher, Kansas City, MO)

- Fisher FL-1

=== Fisher ===
(Fisher Div, General Motors Corp, Cleveland, OH)

- Fisher P-75 Eagle

=== Fisher ===
((Gene and Darlene Jackson-Hanson) Fisher Flying Products, Edgely, ND)

- Fisher FP-101
- Fisher FP-202 Koala
- Fisher FP-303
- Fisher FP-404
- Fisher FP-505 Skeeter
- Fisher FP-606 Sky Baby
- Fisher Avenger
- Fisher Barnstormer
- Fisher Boomerang
- Fisher Classic
- Fisher Flyer
- Fisher Horizon
- Fisher Dakota Hawk
- Fisher Horizon
- Fisher Celebrity
- Fisher R-80 Tiger Moth
- Fisher Youngster

=== Fisher-Boretski ===
- Fisher-Boretski FiBo-2

=== Fishercraft ===
(Ed Fisher, Painesville, OH)

- Fishercraft Zippy Sport

=== Fisk ===
(Edwin Fisk)

- Fisk 1911 Monoplane
- Fisk 1919 Biplane
- Fisk-Standard

=== Fitzsimmons ===
(Frank Fitzsimmons, Hempstead, NY)

- Fitzsimmons 1911 Monoplane

=== Fizir ===
(Rudolf Fizi)

- Fizir-Maybach
- Fizir-Mercedes
- Fizir-Wright
- Fizir-Gypsi
- Fizir-Jupiter
- Fizir-Vega
- Fizir-Loren (sic)
- Fizir-Lorraine
- Fizir 85 CV
- Fizir AF-2 - flying boat (1931)
- Fizir F1G Titan
- Fizir F1G Kastor
- Fizir F1M - two-seat reconnaissance floatplane (1930)
- Fizir FN - two-seat trainer
- Fizir FN-H - two-seat training floatplane (1931)
- Fizir F1V
- Fizir FP-1
- Fizir FP-2
- Fizir FT Nastavni (also known as the Zmaj FP-2??)
- Fizir FT-1 Nebošja

== Fk ==
=== FK-Lightplanes ===
- FK-Lightplanes SW51 Mustang

== Fl ==
=== Flaeming Air ===
(Brandenburg, Germany)

- Flaeming Air FA 01 Smaragd
- Flaeming Air FA 02
- Flaeming Air FA 04 Peregrine
- Flaeming Air FA 04 SL

=== Flagg ===
(Flaggships Inc, San Diego, CA)

- Flagg F.13 Bug (a.k.a. Flagg-Raymond)
- Flagg F.15 San Diego (a.k.a. FAC Special)
- Flagg Student Pal (a.k.a. Marshall Flyer)

=== Flagg-Snyder ===
((Claude) Flagg-(Barney) Snyder, San Diego, CA)

- Flagg-Snyder Racer (later rebuilt as Butz F-1)

=== Flaglor ===
(F K "Chuck" Flaglor, Des Plaines, IL)

- Flaglor High-Tow
- Flaglor Low-Tow
- Flaglor Scooter

=== Flamingo ===
(Metal Aircraft Corp, Lunken Airport, Cincinnati, OH)

- Flamingo All-Metal Tranship
- Flamingo G-1
- Flamingo G-2
- Flamingo G-MT-6

=== Flanders ===
- Flanders B.2
- Flanders B.3
- Flanders F.1
- Flanders F.2
- Flanders F.3
- Flanders F.4
- Flanders F.5
- Flanders S.2

=== Flaris ===
- Flaris Lar 1

=== Fleet ===
- Fleet Model 1
- Fleet Model 2
- Fleet Model 5
- Fleet Model 7 Fawn
- Fleet Finch
- Fleet Model 21
- Fleet 50 Freighter
- Fleet 60 Fort
- Fleet 80 Canuck
- Fleet helicopter

=== Fleetcraft ===
(Fleet Airplane Corp (fdr: John B Moore), Lincoln Nebraska)

- Fleetcraft A
- Fleetcraft Cadet (a.k.a. Fleetwing Cadet)

=== Fleetwings ===
(c.1930: Fleetwings Inc (pres: Frank or Cecil de Ganahl), Radcliffe St, Bristol, PA 1934: Plant acquired by Hall Aluminum Aircraft Co. 1941: (Henry J) Kaiser-Fleetwings Inc (pres: E E Trefethen Jr).)

- Fleetwings 1931 Monoplane
- Fleetwings A-1
- Fleetwings F-4 Sea Bird (F-401)
- Fleetwings F-5 Sea Bird
- Fleetwings BT-12 Sophomore
- Fleetwings PQ-12
- Fleetwings 23
- Fleetwings 33
- Fleetwings 36
- Fleetwings 37
- Fleetwings BQ-1
- Fleetwings BQ-2
- Kaiser-Fleetwings A-39
- Kaiser-Fleetwings BTK
- Kaiser-Fleetwings Twirleybird

=== Fleming ===
(J W T and William G Fleming, Memphis, TN)

- Fleming 1929 Biplane

=== Flemming ===
(Jim Flemming)

- Flemming XNU-1

=== Fletcher ===
(Daniel & Richard Fletcher)

- Fletcher Bushbird

=== Fletcher ===
((Wendell, Frank, Maurice) Fletcher Aviation Corp, 190 W Colorado St, Pasadena, CA)

- Fletcher BG-1
- Fletcher BG-2
- Fletcher BG-3
- Fletcher CQ-1
- Fletcher FBT-2
- Fletcher FL-23
- Fletcher FU-24
- Fletcher FD-25
- Fletcher Model 1
- Fletcher PQ-11

=== Fletcher's Ultralights ===
(Turlock, California, USA)

- Fletcher Hercules
- Fletcher Hercules Cruiser
- Fletcher Hercules Cross Country

=== Flettner ===
(Flettner Flugzeugbau GmbH / Anton Flettner G.m.b.H.)

- Flettner Gigant
- Flettner Fl 184
- Flettner Fl 185
- Flettner Fl 265
- Flettner Fl 282 Kolibri
- Flettner Fl 285
- Flettner Fl 339

=== Fleury ===
(Robert Fleury)

- Fleury RF.10 Vedette
- Fleury RF.21 Trimard

=== Flexible ===
(Flexible Aeroplane Co.)

- Flexible 1909 Aeroplane

=== Flight Design ===
(Landsberied, Germany)

- Flight Design Axxess
- Flight Design Boxtair
- Flight Design C4
- Flight Design CT
- Flight Design CT2K
- Flight Design CTSW
- Flight Design CTLS
- Flight Design MC
- Flight Design CTLS-Lite
- Flight Design CTHL
- Flight Design CTLE
- Flight Design CTLSi
- Flight Design CT Supralight
- Flight Design Exxtacy
- Flight Design Stream
- Flight Design Twin

=== Flightsail ===
(Flight Dynamics (pres: Thomas H Purcell Jr), Raleigh, NC)

- Flightsail VII

=== Flightstar ===
(Flightstar Sportplanes)

- Flightstar
- Flightstar Formula
- Flightstar Spyder
- Flightstar Loadstar
- Flightstar e-Spyder
- Flightstar II
- Flightstar IISL
- Flightstar IISC

=== Flightship ===
- Flightship FS8 WiG

=== Flight Team ===
(Flight Team UG & Company AG, Ippesheim, Germany)

- Flight Team Spider
- Flight Team Twister

=== Flightworks ===
(Flightworks Corp, Austin, TX)

- Flightworks Capella
- Flightworks Capella XS

=== Fliteways ===
(Fliteways Inc (Ben White), Milwaukee, WI)

- Fliteways Special

=== Flitzer Sportplanes ===
(Aberdare, United Kingdom)

- Flitzer Z-21

=== Florine ===
(Nicolas Florine, Belgium)

- Florine Helicopter No.1
- Florine Helicopter No.2
- Florine Helicopter No.3 (1933)

=== Florov ===
- Florov No4302

=== Floyd-Bean ===
(Bob Bean & Tom Floyd, Inglewood, CA)

- Floyd-Bean Special

=== FLS ===
- FLS Sprint

=== F L S Z ===
(Flight Level Six-Zero Inc, Colorado Springs, CO)

- F L S Z Der Kricket DK-1
- F L S Z Vagrant II

=== Flugschule Wings ===
(Spital am Pyhrn, Austria)

- Flugschule Wings Alfa

=== Flugtechnischer Verein Spandau ===
- Flugtechnischer Verein Spandau 1925 monoplane

=== Fly Air ===
(Fly Air Limited, Trudovec, Bulgaria)

- Fly Air Swallow
- Fly Air Trike Moster

=== Fly Castelluccio ===
(Fly Castelluccio Paramotor Paragliding and Trike srl, Ascoli Piceno, Italy)

- Fly Castelluccio Diavolo
- Fly Castelluccio Flash
- Fly Castelluccio Mach
- Fly Castelluccio SMN

=== Fly Hard Trikes ===
(Wildwood, Georgia, United States)

- Fly Hard Trikes SkyCycle

=== Fly Products ===
(Grottammarre, Italy)

- Fly Products Eco
- Fly Products Flash
- Fly Products Gold
- Fly Products Jet
- Fly Products Kompress
- Fly Products Max
- Fly Products Power
- Fly Products Race
- Fly Products Rider
- Fly Products Sprint
- Fly Products Thrust
- Fly Products Xenit

=== Fly Synthesis ===
- Fly Synthesis Wallaby
- Fly Synthesis Catalina
- Fly Synthesis Storch
- Fly Synthesis Syncro
- Fly Synthesis Texan

=== Fly Wurm ===
(Paul Maiwurm, Mission Beach (San Diego), CA)

- Fly Wurm 1929 Barrelplane

=== Fly-Fan ===
(Fly-Fan sro, Trenčín, Slovakia)

- Fly-Fan Shark

=== FlyLatino ===
(FlyLatino, Latina, Italy)

- FL 100 RG

=== FlyNano ===
(Lahti, Finland)

- FlyNano Nano

=== Flyfabrikk ===
(Norske Hæren Flyfabrikk)

- Flyfabrikk 1918 biplane

=== Flygfabriken ===
(Svenska Flygfabriken)

- Flygfabriken LN-3 Seagull

=== Flying Auto ===
(Flying Auto Co.)

- Flying Auto 1909 Aeroplane

=== Flying K ===
- Flying K Sky Raider
- Flying K Sky Raider II
- Flying K Super Sky Raider
- Flying K Frontier

=== Flying Legend ===
(Caltagirone, Italy)

- Flying Legend Hawker Hurricane Replica
- Flying Legend Tucano Replica

=== Flying Machines s.r.o. ===
(Rasošky, Czech Republic)

- Flying Machines FM250 Vampire
- Flying Machines FM301
- Flying Machines B612

=== Flying Mercury ===
(Hibbing MN.)

- Flying Mercury 1930 Monoplane

=== Flyitalia ===
(Dovera, Italy)

- Flyitalia MD3 Rider

=== Flylab ===
(Flylab Srl, Ischitella, Italy)

- Flylab Tucano

=== Flylight Airsports ===
(Northampton, United Kingdom)

- Flylight Doodle Bug
- Flylight Dragonfly
- Flylight E-Dragon
- Flylight Motorfloater

=== Flyvetroppernes Værksteder ===
(Flyverkorpsets Værksteder (1924–32); Flyvertroppernes Værksteder (1932-1943))

- O-Maskine. I O
- O-Maskine. II O

=== Flywhale ===
(Flywhale Aircraft)

- Flywhale Aircraft Flywhale

== Fm ==
=== FMA ===
see:Fábrica Militar de Aviones

=== FMP s.r.o. ===
(Prague, Czech Republic)

- FMP Qualt 201

== Fo ==
=== Focke-Achgelis ===
(Focke-Achgelis & Co. GmbH)

- Focke-Achgelis Fa 61
- Focke-Acheglis Fa 223 Drache (Dragon), transport helicopter (prototype)
- Focke-Achgelis Fa 224 Libelle (Dragonfly), single-seat sport derivative of Fa 61
- Focke-Achgelis Fa 225 autogiro assault glider conversion; DFS 230 with one Fa 223 rotor set
- Focke-Achgelis Fa 236, designation probably not used
- Focke-Achgelis Fa 266 Hornisse (Hornet), passenger version of Fa 223
- Focke-Achgelis Fa 267, ASW/medevac transport derivative of Fa 223
- Focke-Achgelis Fa 269, twin rotor convertiplane fighter
- Focke-Achgelis Fa 283, turbojet-powered autogiro
- Focke-Achgelis Fa 284 twin rotor flying crane helicopter
- Focke-Achgelis Fa 325 Krabbe (Crab), twin-tandem, four rotor helicopter, also known as Fa 223Z
- Focke-Achgelis Fa 330 Bachstelze (Wagtail), U-boat towed rotor kite
- Focke-Acheglis Fa 336 (1943) streamlined helicopter; also known as Fa 336KH
- Focke-Achgelis Fa 336 (1944) powered version of Fa 330

=== Focke-Wulf ===
(Focke-Wulf Flugzeugbau GmbH)

- Focke-Wulf S 1 Two-seat high-wing trainer aircraft
- Focke-Wulf S 2 Two-seat parasol-wing trainer aircraft
- Focke-Wulf W.4 Two-seat trainer/reconnaissance floatplane
- Focke-Wulf W.7
- Focke-Wulf A 3
- Focke-Wulf A 4
- Focke-Wulf A 5
- Focke-Wulf A 6
- Focke-Wulf A 7 Storch two-seat shoulder-wing monoplane
- Focke-Wulf A 16
- Focke-Wulf A 17 Möwe
- Focke-Wulf GL 18 twin-engine version of A 16
- Focke-Wulf F 19 Ente
- Focke-Wulf A 20 Habicht
- Focke-Wulf A 21 Photomöwe, aerial photography version of A 17
- Focke-Wulf GL 22 revised GL 18 with Siemens Sh 12 engines
- Focke-Wulf K 23 Buchfink two-seat reconnaissance aircraft; burned in hangar fire
- Focke-Wulf S 24 Kiebitz
- Focke-Wulf A 26 version of A 16 as engine test bed for DVL
- Focke-Wulf A 28 version of A 20 with Bristol Titan engine
- Focke-Wulf A 29 Möwe A 16 with BMW VI engine
- Focke-Wulf C 30 Heuschrecke (Cierva C.30)
- Focke-Wulf A 32 Bussard
- Focke-Wulf A 33 Sperber
- Focke-Wulf A 34 shoulder-wing, single-engine mail plane
- Focke-Wulf A 36 Mastgans low-wing, single-engine mail plane
- Focke-Wulf A 38 Möwe
- Focke-Wulf S 39 two-seat parasol-wing reconnaissance aircraft; also known as Fw 39
- Focke-Wulf A 40 two-seat parasol-wing reconnaissance aircraft; also known as Fw 40
- Focke-Wulf A 43 three-seat high-wing cabin monoplane; redesignated Fw 43
- Focke-Wulf A 47 two-seat parasol-wing reconnaissance aircraft; redesignated Fw 47
- Focke-Wulf Fw 42 canard wing, six-seat medium bomber, based on F 19
- Focke-Wulf Fw 43 Falke
- Focke-Wulf Fw 44 Stieglitz
- Focke-Wulf Fw 47 Höhengeier
- Focke-Wulf Fw 55 Albatros L 102 derivative; two-seat trainer aircraft
- Focke-Wulf Fw 56 Stösser
- Focke-Wulf Fw 57
- Focke-Wulf Fw 58 Weihe
- Focke-Wulf Fw 61 helicopter; also known as Fa 61
- Focke-Wulf Fw 62
- Focke-Wulf Ta 152
- Focke-Wulf Ta 154 Moskito
- Focke-Wulf Fw 159
- Focke-Wulf Ta 183 Huckebein Jet interceptor fighter
- Focke-Wulf Fw 186 Autogyro reconnaissance aircraft
- Focke-Wulf Fw 187 Falke
- Focke-Wulf Fw 189 Uhu
- Focke-Wulf Fw 190 Würger
- Focke-Wulf Fw 191
- Focke-Wulf Fw 200 Condor
- Focke-Wulf Fw 206
- Focke-Wulf Fw 238 four-engine strategic bomber
- Focke-Wulf Fw 249 Grosstransporter, eight-engine heavy transport
- Focke-Wulf Fw 251 three-seat all-weather jet fighter
- Focke-Wulf Ta 254
- Focke-Wulf Fw 259 Frontjäger, fighter
- Focke-Wulf Fw 261 four-engine heavy bomber
- Focke-Wulf Fw 272 mixed-power multipurpose fighter
- Focke-Wulf Fw 281 single-seat turboprop fighter; turboprop version of "Flitzer"
- Focke-Wulf Ta 283 Strahlrohrjäger
- Focke-Wulf Fw 300
- Focke-Wulf Fw 391 Fw 191 development
- Focke-Wulf Ta 400
- Focke-Wulf Fw 491 Fw 391 development
- Focke-Wulf Project I
- Focke-Wulf Project II
- Focke-Wulf Project III
- Focke-Wulf Project IV
- Focke-Wulf Project V
- Focke-Wulf Project VII
- Focke-Wulf Project VIII
- Focke-Wulf 1000x1000x1000; also known as Fw 239
- Foche Rochen
- Focke-Wulf Super Lorin
- Focke-Wulf Super TL
- Focke-Wulf Triebflügel
- Focke-Wulf Volksjäger

=== Fokker ===
(Fokker Flugzeug-Werke G.m.b.H.) - Schwerin, Germany (Fokker and Idflieg designation prefixes)

- A = Unarmed single seat monoplane
- B = Unarmed single-seat biplane, later Amphibian(*)
- C = Two-seat armed reconnaissance/bomber
- D = Doppeldecker (biplane fighter), later Fighter
- DC = Two-seat fighter-reconnaissance
- Dr = Dreidecker (triplane fighter)
- E = Eindecker (Armed monoplane fighter)
- F = Transport aircraft(*)
- G = Twin-engine fighter/bomber(*)
- K = Kampfflugzeug (Attack aircraft)
- S = Trainer (*)
- T = Torpedo-Bomber and Bomber (*)
- V = Versuchflugzeug (Experimental)
- W = Wasserflugzeug (Flying Boat)
- Fokker 50 46-56 regional turboprop airliner, improved F27
- Fokker 60 stretched cargo freighter version of Fokker 50
- Fokker 70 shortened version of Fokker 100
- Fokker 80 77 passenger version of F28
- Fokker 100 109-seat regional jetliner, essentially a stretched F28
- Fokker 130 137 passenger version of F28/100
- Fokker Model 102 CL-2m
- Fokker Model 104 twin-engine, high-wing airliner
- Fokker Model 105 Model 104 with Jumo 4 diesel engines
- Fokker Model 106 low-wing airliner with Jumo 4 diesel engines
- Fokker Model 107 slightly enlarged Model 105
- Fokker Model 108 Model 107 with more engine power
- Fokker Model 109 B.5, three-engine flying boat; lost to the Do 24
- Fokker Model 110 unknown, possible D.XIX design
- Fokker Model 111 twin-engine Luchtcruiser (air cruiser) to LVA specification; type number was reused, but the final T.V was a different design
- Fokker Model 112 D.XXI precursor
- Fokker Model 115 T.VI, four-engine bomber with F.36 wing for Czechoslovakia, Turkey and Russia
- Fokker Model 116 twin-engine airliner, presumably 12-seat
- Fokker Model 117 twin-engine airliner, probably 16-seat
- Fokker Model 118 projected version of F.VIII with wing-mounted Pratt & Whitney Wasp engines
- Fokker Model 119 single-engine monoplane fighter; dimensions close to the D.21
- Fokker Model 120 single-engine multipurpose biplane
- Fokker Model 120A C.11W, seaplane for MLD
- Fokker Model 121 twin-engine 'sleeper' airliner for ABA
- Fokker Model 121 (1935) twin-engine mailplane project
- Fokker Model 122 twin-engine bomber for Finland
- Fokker Model 122A twin-engine night bomber version of Model 122
- Fokker Model 123 two-seat fighter for Finland
- Fokker Model 124 D.XVII/D.XIX variant with closed cockpit
- Fokker Model 124A Model 124 with open cockpit
- Fokker Model 125 twin-engine naval aircraft
- Fokker Model 126 three-seat monoplane reconnaissance-bomber/scout
- Fokker Model 127 F.56
- Fokker Model 128 10-seat, twin-engine airliner; similar to the Lockheed Electra
- Fokker Model 129 twin-engine fighter; further developed into G.I
- Fokker Model 130 projected G.1 variant developed as a bomber
- Fokker Model 130 (II) twin-engine mail plane; as Model 122A but smaller
- Fokker Model 131 C.XIII-W
- Fokker Model 132 20-24 seat, four-engine airliner
- Fokker Model 133 20-seat, four-engine, all-metal airliner with pressurized cabin
- Fokker Model 134 T.8W
- Fokker Model 135 all-metal twin-engine bomber for the ML/KNIL, development of G.I
- Fokker Model 136 24-seat, four-engine airliner with pressurized cabin
- Fokker Model 137 Eight-seat, twin-engine airliner in mixed construction
- Fokker Model 138 ten-seat aircraft with coupled engines and a single propeller
- Fokker Model 139 twin-boom, ten-seat airliner with twin coupled engines and pusher props and tricycle landing gear
- Fokker Model 140 twin-tail, nine-seat airliner with twin coupled engines and pusher props; smaller fuselage than Model 139
- Fokker Model 141 twin-engine, nine-seat airliner ("application plane") in mixed construction
- Fokker Model 142 T.IX
- Fokker Model 143 alternate to Model 142
- Fokker Model 144 twin-engine, 10-seat airliner (similar to Lockheed 14) with high-mounted wooden wing, metal fuselage and tricycle landing gear
- Fokker Model 145 as Model 144 but eight-seat
- Fokker Model 146 three-engine flying boat for the MLD; resembled the Do 24
- Fokker Model 147 four-seat school trainer/air taxi with pusher propeller and twin boom fuselage
- Fokker Model 148 four-six seat tourer aircraft designs
- Fokker Model 149 all-metal trainer/transitional aircraft
- Fokker Model 150 D.22, single-seat fighter with radial engine
- Fokker Model 151 D.22, single-seat fighter with liquid-cooled engine
- Fokker Model 152 T.VI; combination of the T.V and G.I
- Fokker Model 153 mixed construction alternative to Model 149
- Fokker Model 154 G.II, twin-engine jachtcruiser (cruiser-fighter), G.I successor; redesignated as G.16 and CG.II
- Fokker Model 155 D.23
- Fokker Model 156 larger version of Model 155
- Fokker Model 157 Ghome-Rhone 14M-powered version of Model 155
- Fokker Model 158 four-engine, 24-seat airliner with tricycle landing gear
- Fokker Model 159 four-engine, 48-seat airliner with tricycle landing gear
- Fokker Model 160 "Intercontinental" airliner with pressurized cabin and accommodations in the wing; five Daimler-Benz engines and twin-boom tail; also projected with nine engines
- Fokker Model 160a very large six-engine aircraft
- Fokker Model 161 C.X with Daimler-Benz engine and enclosed cockpit; to IML specification, but not offered
- Fokker Model 162 high-wing, two-seat fighter with retractable landing gear; to IML specification
- Fokker Model 163 strategic reconnaissance/jachtcruiser based on G.I; to IML specification
- Fokker Model 164 high-wing, two-seat fighter with fixed landing gear; to IML specification
- Fokker Model 166 military transport based on T.IX
- Fokker Model 167 12-seat, four-engine airliner with pressurized cabin
- Fokker Model 168 enlarged T.VIII-W for the MLD; designated as T.10W if offered
- Fokker Model 169 single-engine torpedo-seaplane for the MLD; to be designated T.10W if offered
- Fokker Model 170 16-seat, high-wing, three-engine airliner with pressurized cabin and tricycle landing gear
- Fokker Model 171 large, 24-seat, high-wing three-engine airliner with pressurized cabin and tricycle landing gear; also projected in bomber and transport versions
- Fokker Model 172 twin-engine flying boat for Nederlandsche Nieuw Guinea Petroleum Maatschappij; resembles the Grumman Goose, but slightly larger
- Fokker Model 173 large, 24-seat four-engine airliner with push-pull engines
- Fokker Model 174 twin-engine flying boat for Nederlandsche Nieuw Guinea Petroleum Maatschappij; slightly enlarged version of Model 172
- Fokker Model 175 twin-engine airliner with high-mounted T.IX wing and new fuselage for 18 passengers; cancelled as it was too small
- Fokker Model 176 eight-seat, three-engine airliner with pressurized cabin
- Fokker Model 177 three-engine airliner with Model 175 wing; apparently a three-engine version of Model 175
- Fokker Model 178 large 16-seat, four-engine airliner with pressurized cabin and push-pull engines
- Fokker Model 179 G.1 derivative with fixed observer's position under the fuselage
- Fokker Model 180 "Intercontinental" airliner, also known as Model 160; four or five engine with accommodations in the wing; many design variations
- Fokker Model 181 very large airliner, similar to Model 180 with accommodation in the wing, three engines and twin tail booms; cockpit between the engines (KLM did not want oil ejected from a mid-engine on the windshield)
- Fokker Model 182 very large airliner, similar to Model 180 with accommodation in the wing, four push-pull engines and twin tail booms
- Fokker Model 183 twin-float, eight-seat transport for Nederlandsche Nieuw Guinea Petroleum Maatschappij; civil derivative of T.VIII-W
- Fokker Model 184 first Indische Jachtkruiser (Indies Cruiser-Fighter)
- Fokker Model 185 alternative to Model 184
- Fokker Model 186 second Indische Jachtkruiser (Indies Cruiser-Fighter) design, G.III
- Fokker Model 187 third Indische Jachtkruiser (Indies Cruiser-Fighter) design, slightly enlarged Model 186
- Fokker Model 188 twin-engine amphibious aircraft for NEI (MNILM and government); same model as Model 172 and Model 174
- Fokker Model 189 twin-engine amphibious aircraft for NEI (MNILM and government); slightly smaller than Model 188
- Fokker Model 190 twin-engine amphibious aircraft for NEI (MNILM and government); smaller than Model 189
- Fokker Model 191 four-engine, high-wing, 24-seat airliner
- Fokker Model 192 D.24
- Fokker Model 193 F.24
- Fokker Model 194 C.15W
- Fokker Model 195 jachtcruiser, alternative to Model 154
- Fokker Model 196 twin-engine amphibious aircraft for KNILM; larger than Model 190
- Fokker Model 197 single-engine, two-seat multipurpose aircraft, based on D.21
- Fokker Model 198 jachtcruiser, alternative to Model 154
- Fokker Model 199 jachtcruiser, alternative to Model 154
- Fokker Model 200 large, 24-seat four-engine airliner with pressurized cabin; similar to Model 180 but lighter
- Fokker Model 201 all-metal jachtcruiser for the ML/KNIL, continuation of Model 186
- Fokker Model 202 no details
- Fokker Model 203 modified D.VII with Argus engine; intended as a gift to Hermann Göring
- Fokker Model 204 small single-seat biplane, same engine as Model 203
- Fokker Model 205 four-engine, 40-seat double-decker airliner
- Fokker Model 206 four-engine, 39-seat double-decker airliner
- Fokker Model 207 four-engine, 5-ton cargo freighter for KLM with twin tail booms
- Fokker Model 208 twin-engine, 12-ton cargo freighter for KLM with twin tail booms
- Fokker Model 209 large twin-engine aircraft for KLM with twin tail booms, small middle body, four cargo containers under the wings
- Fokker Model 210 four-engine, double-decker airliner, improved Model 205
- Fokker Model 232 F26
- Fokker Model 236F internal designation for the S.13
- Fokker Model 238
- Fokker Model 239 early S.14 designs
- Fokker Model 240 S.14 designs
- Fokker Model 265 Nene-powered S.14 with four 20 mm cannons
- Fokker Model 275 F.27
- Fokker Model 335 Fokker 50
- Fokker A.I
- Fokker A.II
- Fokker A.III
- Fokker B.I (1915) reconnaissance biplane (Austro-Hungarian military designation)
- Fokker B.I (1922) flying boat (Fokker designation)
- Fokker B.II (1916) reconnaissance biplane (Austro-Hungarian military designation)
- Fokker B.II (1923) flying boat (Fokker designation)
- Fokker B.III flying boat (Fokker designation)
- Fokker B.IV flying boat (Fokker designation)
- Fokker B.V
- Fokker BA-1
- Fokker C.I
- Fokker C.II
- Fokker C.III
- Fokker C.IV
- Fokker C.V
- Fokker C.VI
- Fokker C.VII (1925) based on C.V-D
- Fokker C.VII (1926)
- Fokker C.VII-L
- Fokker C.VII-W
- Fokker C.VIII
- Fokker C.IX
- Fokker C.X
- Fokker C.XI-W
- Fokker C.XII (1935)
- Fokker C.XII (1936)
- Fokker C.XIII-W
- Fokker C.XIV
- Fokker C.XV floatplane, unbuilt
- Fokker C.16 redesignation of G.2 project; became CG.2
- Fokker CC.I
- Fokker CC.II
- Fokker CC.III
- Fokker CG.2
- Fokker CS.III
- Fokker CL-2m based on Lockheed 12 Electra
- Fokker D.I
- Fokker D.II
- Fokker D.III
- Fokker D.IV
- Fokker D.V
- Fokker D.VI
- Fokker D.VII
- Fokker D.VIII
- Fokker D.IX
- Fokker D.X
- Fokker D.XI
- Fokker D.XII
- Fokker D.XIII
- Fokker D.XIV
- Fokker D.XVI
- Fokker D.XVII
- Fokker D.XVIII unbuilt project
- Fokker D.XIX unbuilt project
- Fokker D.XX unbuilt project
- Fokker D.XXI
- Fokker D.22 unbuilt project
- Fokker D.23
- Fokker D.24
- Fokker D.24
- Fokker DC.I
- Fokker DC.II
- Fokker Dr.I
- Fokker E.I
- Fokker E.II
- Fokker E.III
- Fokker E.IV
- Fokker E.V
- Fokker F.I triplane fighter aircraft (German military designation)
- Fokker F.I (1919) V.44 not completed; airliner (Fokker designation)
- Fokker F.II 5-seat, single-engine, high-wing airliner
- Fokker F.III 5-seat, single-engine, high-wing airliner
- Fokker F.IV 12-seat, single-engine, high-wing airliner
- Fokker F.V 8-seat convertible biplane/monoplane airliner
- Fokker F.VI Fokker designation for PW-5
- Fokker F.VII 8-seat, high-wing trimotor airliner
- Fokker F.VIII (1921) variation of F.V convertible concept; based on F.V
- Fokker F.VIII 15-seat, twin-engine high-wing airliner
- Fokker F.VIII-W floatplane derivative of F.VIII (project)
- Fokker F.IX 20-seat, high-wing trimotor airliner, enlarged F.VIII
- Fokker F.X (1925) unbuilt project
- Fokker F.XI 5-seat airliner; essentially a modernized F.II
- Fokker F.XII 12-seat, high-wing trimotor airliner
- Fokker F.XIII unbuilt project; twin-engine floatplane, T.IV derivative
- Fokker F.XIV prototype single-engine cargo freighter; later converted to 8-seat trimotor airliner
- Fokker F.XV unbuilt project; basically a scaled-up F.XII
- Fokker F.XVI unbuilt project; four-engine version of F.XV
- Fokker F.XVII unbuilt project; 6-9 passenger airliner/mailplane
- Fokker F.XVIII 12-seat, high-wing trimotor airliner; scaled up F.XII
- Fokker F.XIX unbuilt project; four-engine push-pull derivative of F.XVIII
- Fokker F.XX 12-seat, high-wing trimotor airliner
- Fokker F.XXI unbuilt project; scaled-down F.XX
- Fokker F.XXII 22-seat, high-wing, four-engine airliner
- Fokker F.XXIII F.22 with retractable landing gear
- Fokker F.XXIV projected 24-passenger, high-wing, twin-engine airliner
- Fokker F.25 Promotor, single-engine, twin-boom, four-seat monoplane
- Fokker F.26 Phantom, early jetliner design
- Fokker F.27 Friendship turboprop regional airliner
- Fokker F.28 Fellowship twin-engine short-range jetliner
- Fokker F.29 jetliner concept
- Fokker F.XXXVI referred to as the "F.Y" by KLM
- F.37 improved version of F.36 with retractable landing gear, lighter frame, GR-1820-G engines and side-by-side cockpit
- Fokker F.40
- Fokker F.56 projected 56-seat, four-engine, double-deck airliner
- Fokker F.60
- Fokker F.160
- Fokker F.180
- Fokker F.. 76m2 designation refers to wing area
- Fokker G.I
- Fokker G.2
- Fokker G.3
- Fokker K.I
- Fokker M.1 military version of Fokker Spin
- Fokker M.2
- Fokker M.3
- Fokker M.4
- Fokker M.5 A.II/A.III
- Fokker M.6
- Fokker M.7 B.I
- Fokker M.8 A.I
- Fokker M.9 K.I
- Fokker M.10
- Fokker M.11
- Fokker M.12
- Fokker M.14 E.I/E.II/E.III
- Fokker M.15 E.IV
- Fokker M.16
- Fokker M.17 B.II, D.II
- Fokker M.18 prototype for D.I
- Fokker M.19 D.III
- Fokker M.20
- Fokker M.21
- Fokker M.22
- Fokker P.1 Partner
- Fokker S-3
- Fokker S.I
- Fokker S.II
- Fokker S.III
- Fokker S.IV
- Fokker S.V
- Fokker S.VI
- Fokker S.VII
- Fokker S.IX
- Fokker S.X
- Fokker S-11
- Fokker S-12
- Fokker S-13
- Fokker S-14
- Fokker S-15
- Fokker S-16
- Fokker Spin
- Fokker T.I project
- Fokker T.II
- Fokker T.III
- Fokker T.III-F cabin version of T.III-W
- Fokker T.III-W
- Fokker T.IV
- Fokker T.V
- Fokker T.VI (1934) unbuilt four-engine heavy bomber
- Fokker T.VI (1937) unbuilt twin-boom, twin-engine bomber
- Fokker T.VII
- Fokker T.VIII
- Fokker T.IX
- Fokker T.10
- Fokker V.1
- Fokker V.2
- Fokker V.3
- Fokker V.3 (1920)
- Fokker V.4
- Fokker V.5
- Fokker V.6
- Fokker V.7
- Fokker V.8
- Fokker V.9
- Fokker V.10
- Fokker V.11
- Fokker V.12
- Fokker V.13
- Fokker V.14
- Fokker V.16
- Fokker V.17
- Fokker V.18
- Fokker V.20
- Fokker V.21
- Fokker V.22
- Fokker V.23
- Fokker V.24
- Fokker V.25
- Fokker V.26
- Fokker V.27
- Fokker V.28
- Fokker V.29
- Fokker V.30
- Fokker V.31
- Fokker V.33
- Fokker V.34
- Fokker V.35
- Fokker V.36
- Fokker V.37
- Fokker V.38
- Fokker V.39
- Fokker V.40
- Fokker V.41
- Fokker V.43
- Fokker V.44 not completed
- Fokker V.45
- Fokker W.1
- Fokker W.3
- Fokker W.4
- Fokker-VAK 191
- Fokker-VFW 614

=== Fokker-Atlantic ===
- Fokker Model 1 DH-4M2, XCO-8
- Fokker Model 2 S-3
- Fokker Model 3 AO-1, XCO-4, CO-4A
- Fokker Model 4 Universal
- Fokker Model 5 XLB-2
- Fokker Model 6 F-7
- Fokker Model 7 C-2, C-7, TA (RA)
- Fokker Model 8 Skeeter
- Fokker Model 8 Super Universal
- Fokker Model 9 B.IIIC/F.11/B.11, amphibian built for H.S. Vanderbilt
- Fokker Model 10 F.10
- Fokker Model 11 Fokker-Hall H-51
- Fokker Model 12 F.32
- Fokker Model 13 prototype with side-by-side cockpit, strut-braced parasol wing, fabric-covered fuselage
- Fokker Model 14 F-14
- Fokker A-2 T-2 converted to air ambulance
- Fokker AO-1 artillery observation version of C.IV
- Fokker BA-1 designation for Richard Byrd's aircraft for flight to North Pole
- Fokker C-2 military transport version of F-9
- Fokker C-5 military transport version of F-10
- Fokker C-7 military transport conversion of C-2A
- Fokker C-14 military transport version of F-14
- Fokker C-15 C-14 converted to air ambulance
- Fokker C-16 military transport version of F-11
- Fokker C-20 military transport version of F-32
- Fokker CO-4 US Army Corps observation version of C.IV
- Fokker CO-8 US Army Corps observation version of DH-4M-2
- Fokker FA
- Fokker FLB
- Fokker FT
- Fokker JA
- Fokker O-27 high-speed observation aircraft
- Fokker PW-5 fighter developed from the D.VIII
- Fokker PW-6 USAAS designation for D.IX
- Fokker PW-7 USAAS designation for D.XI
- Fokker T-2 US designation for F.IV
- Fokker TA military transport version of F.VII; redesignated to RA
- Fokker TW-4 USAAS trainer version of S.I
- Fokker XA-7 attack aircraft prototype
- Fokker XB-8 prototype bomber developed from the O-27
- Fokker XLB-2 experimental light bomber version of the C-7
- Fokker F-7
- Fokker F-8 Super Universal
- Fokker F-9 American-built version of F.VIIB-3m
- Fokker F-10 enlarged version of F.VII
- Fokker F-11 luxury flying boat
- Fokker F-14 seven/nine-seat, single-engine airliner
- Fokker AF-15 flying boat
- Fokker F-18
- Fokker F-32 four-engine (push-pull), 32-seat airliner
- Fokker DH-4M
- Fokker-Hall H-51
- Fokker Universal Airliner & freighter
- Fokker Standard Universal
- Fokker Super Universal Airliner & freighter
- Fokker Skeeter

=== Folkerts ===
(Clayton Folkerts, Moline, IL; Robertson, MO)

- Folkerts#1
- Folkerts#2
- Folkerts#3
- Folkerts#4
- Folkerts#5
- Folkerts Henderson Highwing
- Folkerts Mono-Special
- Folkerts SK-1
- Folkerts SK-2
- Folkerts SK-3
- Folkerts SK-4

=== Folland ===
- Folland Fo.108, also known as Folland 43/37
- Folland Fo.139 Midge
- Folland Fo.145 Gnat

=== Follis ===
(Fred E Follis, Nashville, TN)

- Follis Sport

=== Forbes ===
(David Forbes, Atherton, CA)

- Forbes DAS-IM (a.k.a. wolfram Special)
- Forbes F-3 CobraF-3 Cobra
- Forbes Tonopah Low

=== Forbes & Arnold ===
(Victor F. Forbes and Arthur J. Arnold, Leigh-on-Sea, UK)

- Forbes & Arnold monoplane

=== Ford ===
- Ford Trimotor
  - Ford 4-AT
  - Ford 5-AT as 4-AT but with longer wing and lengthened fuselage
  - Ford 6-AT economy version of 5-AT with three Wright J-6-9 Whirlwind engines
  - Ford 7-AT 6-AT with Pratt & Whitney Wasp in the nose
  - Ford 8-AT 5-AT-C converted to single-engine freighter
  - Ford 9-AT 4-AT-B with three Pratt & Whitney R-985 Wasp Junior engines
  - Ford 10-AT projected larger four-engine version; developed into 12-AT and built as 14-AT, but as a trimotor
  - Ford 11-AT 4-AT-E with three Packard DR-980 diesel engines
  - Ford 12-AT 10-A development
  - Ford 13-A 5-AT-D with two wing-mounted Wright J-6-9 Whirlwind engine and a Wright Cyclone in the nose
  - Ford 14-AT large streamlined 32 passenger trimotor airliner; completed but never flew
  - Ford C-3 4-AT-A for USAAC
    - Ford C-3A 4-AT-E with three R-790-3 Whirlwind engines; converted to C-9 standard
  - Ford C-4 4-AT-B for USAAC
  - Ford C-9 C-3As with R-975-1 Whirlwind engines
  - Ford JR
  - Ford RR
  - Ford XB-906 5-AT-D modified into bomber for USAAC
- Ford Model 15-P flying wing light aircraft
- Ford Flivver
- Ford-Stout Dragonfly
- Ford Executive

=== Ford ===
(Ford Airplane Co, Tulsa, OK)

- Ford 1931 Monoplane

=== Ford-Leigh ===
((Alfred G) Leigh Safety Wing Inc & Brunner-Winkle Co. )

- Ford-Leigh Safety Wing

=== Ford-Van Auken ===
(Edsel Ford & Charles Van Auken, 1302 Woodward Ave, Detroit, MI)

- Ford-Van Auken 1909 Monoplane

=== Forman ===
(Albert V Forman, Medford OR.)

- Forman 1936 Monoplane

=== Forney ===
(Forney Manufacturing Company / Fornaire Aircraft Co.)

- Forney F-1 Aircoupe

=== Fortier ===
(Amilcar E Fortier, New Orleans LA.)

- Fortier 1907 Aeroplane

=== Foss ===
(Al Foss, Rosemead CA.)

- Foss Special

=== Foster ===
(Joe Foster & Floyd Simpson, Anderson SC.)

- Foster Grey Eagle

=== Foster ===
(H C Foster, Vanport PA.)

- Foster 1937 Biplane
- Foster Aerodyne
- Foster Airspeed

=== Foster ===
(Sidney Foster)

- Foster Blood, Sweat and Tears

=== Foster, Wikner Aircraft ===
- Foster Wikner Warferry
- Foster Wikner Wicko

=== Fouga ===
- Fouga CM.7
- Fouga CM.8
- Fouga CM.8 Acro
- Fouga CM.8/13
- Fouga CM.8/15
- Fouga CM.8/13 Sylphe démotorisé
- Fouga CM.8 R13 Cyclone
- Fouga CM.8 R13 Sylphe II
- Fouga CM.8 R13 Sylphe III
- Fouga CM.8 R9.8 Cyclope I
- Fouga CM.8 R9.5 Cyclope II
- Fouga CM.8 R8.3 Midget
- Fouga CM.71
- Fouga CM.82R Lutin
- Fouga CM.821R
- Fouga CM.88 Gémaux
- Fouga CM.10
- Fouga CM.100
- Fouga CM.101R
- Fouga CM.103R
- Fouga CM.130
- Fouga CM.170 Magister
- Fouga CM.171 Makalu
- Fouga CM.175 Zéphir

=== Found ===
(Found Aircraft Development Inc, Parry Sound, Ontario, Canada.)

- Found Air FBA-1A
- Found Air FBA-2C Bush Hawk
- Found Air Model 100 Centennial
- Found Expedition E350
- Found FBA-1
- Found FBA-2
- Found Centennial 100

=== Four Winds ===
- Four Winds Four winds

=== Fournier ===
(René Fournier, Avions Fournier)

- Fournier RF-01
- Fournier RF-2
- Fournier/Alpavia RF 3
- Fournier/Alpavia/Sportavia RF 4
- Fournier/Alpavia/Sportavia RF 5
- Fournier RF-6
- Fournier RF-7
- Fournier RF-8
- Fournier RF-9
- Fournier RF-10
- Fournier SFS-31
- Fournier RF-47

=== Fowler ===
((Robert G) Fowler Corp, San Francisco CA. / R.G. Fowler & Jay Gage)

- Fowler Wright Flyer
- Fowler-Gage Biplane

=== Fowler ===
(Harland D Fowler, New Brunswick NJ.)

- Fowler 1928 Monoplane

=== Fowler ===
(A C Fowler, Hurricane WV.)

- Fowler Sport

=== Fowler ===
(Donald Fowler and Francis Gallant, Boston MA.)

- Fowler 1933 Biplane

=== Fox ===
(Alfred C Fox, Beaverton OR.)

- Fox Sportplane

=== Foxcon Aviation ===
(Foxcon Aviation & Research Pty, Mackay, Queensland, Australia)

- Foxcon Terrier 200

== Fr ==
=== Frakes Aviation ===
- Frakes Mohawk

=== Frame ===
(Augustus J Frame, Columbus OH.)

- Frame Special

=== France-Aviation ===
- Denhaut Hy.479

=== Francis ===
(Royal N "Roy" Francis, Santa Clara area CA.)

- Francis 1910 Biplane
- Francis 1911 Biplane
- Francis 1913 Biplane

=== Francis-Angell ===
(Jerry Francis & Harold Angell, Lansing MI.)

- Francis-Angell 1947 Monoplane

=== Frank ===
(Otto Frank)

- Frank TSF 02

=== Franklin ===
(Franklin Aircraft Corp (first as Joy Mfg Co), Franklin PA)

- Franklin Sport
- Franklin Sport 65 (Model A)
- Franklin Sport 70 (Model B)
- Franklin Sport 90

=== Franklin ===
(Deward Franklin, Boulder City NV.)

- Franklin 1936 Monoplane

=== Franklin ===
(Willy Franklin)

- Franklin Demon-1

=== Franklyn ===
(George Franklyn)

- Franklyn Pea Bee

=== Frati ===
(aircraft designed by Stelio Frati, but produced by various manufacturers)

- F.M.1 Passero
- F.M.2 Bi-Passero
- F.4 Rondone
- Caproni Trento F.5
- F.6 Airone
- F.7 Rondone
- F.8 Falco
- F.9 Sparviero (Sparrow Hawk)
- F.14 Nibbio
- F.15 Picchio
- F.20 Pegaso
- F.20TP Condor
- F.22 Pinguino
- Golden Avio F30
- F.250
- F.260
- SF.260
- F.400 Cobra
- F.480 projected four seat Cobra
- SF.600 Canguro (en: "Kangaroo")
- F.1000
- F.1300 Jet Squalus
- F.2500
- F.3000
- F.3500 Sparviero
- Aermacchi SF.260EA - Most recent variant for Italian Air Force. 30 built
- Aeromere F.8L America
- Ambrosini F.4 Rondone
- Ambrosini F.7 Rondone II
- Aviamilano F.14 Nibbio
- Aviamilano F.8L Series I Falco
- Aviamilano F.8L Series II Falco
- Aviamilano F.250 - first prototype powered by 187 kW (250 hp) Lycoming O-540-AID
- Aviamilano F.260 - two prototypes powered by 194 kW (260 hp) Lycoming O-540-E4A5
- Caproni Trento F.5
- Ditta Movo F.M.1 Passero
- Frati BF-46 - Stelio Frati - Aeroclub de Busto Arsizio, Varese
- Frati Sky Arrow
- General Avia Airtruck
- General Avia F.15 Picchio (Italian: "Woodpecker") - prototype with Lycoming O-320 engine and three seats (1 built)
- General Avia F.15C - version with Continental IO-470 engine and tip tanks (1 built)
- General Avia F.15D - proposed version similar to F.15B with Franklin engine (not built)
- General Avia F.15E - all-metal version of F.15B with Continental IO-520K engine (1 built by General Avia)
- General Avia F.15F Delfino - two-seat version of F.15E with bubble canopy (1 built by General Avia)
- General Avia F.20TP Condor
- General Avia F.22 Pinguino
- General Avia F.200
- General Avia F.3500 Sparviero
- Italair F.20 Pegaso
- JSC Sokol F.15F Excalibur - F.15F built by JSC Sokol for HOAC
- Laverda Super Falco Series IV
- Pasotti F.6 Airone
- Pasotti F.9 Sparviero
- Procaer F.15A - initial production version with Lycoming O-360 engine and four seats (10 built by Procaer)
- Procaer F.15B - similar to F.15A but with larger-span wings and fuel tanks relocated from fuselage to wings (20 built by Procaer)
- Procaer F.400 Cobra
- Promavia F.1300 Jet Squalus
- Sequoia F.8L Falco
- SIAI Marchetti SF.260 - Production version of the F.260
- Vulcanair SF.600 Canguro (en: "Kangaroo")
- Waco Meteor

=== Frederick-Ames ===
(Frederick-Ames Research Corp, Anaheim CA.)

- Frederick-Ames EOS/SFA

=== Free Bird Innovations ===
(Free Bird Innovations, Inc, Detroit Lakes, Minnesota, United States)

- Free Bird Sportlite SS
- Free Bird Sportlite 2
- Free Bird LiteSport II
- Free Bird LiteSport Classic
- Free Bird LiteSport Ultra
- Free Bird Sportlite 103

=== Free Flight ===
(Free Flight Aviation Pty Ltd)

- Free Flight Hornet 130S
- Free Flight Hornet 160

=== Free Spirit ===
(Free Spirit Aircraft Co Inc, Huntington Beach CA.)

- Free Spirit RC 412

=== Freebird Airplane Company ===
(Marshville, North Carolina, United States)

- Freebird I
- Freebird II

=== Freedom Aviation ===
- Freedom Aviation Phoenix

=== Freedom Lite ===
(Freedom Lite Inc, Walton, Ontario, Canada)

- Freedom Lite SS-11 Skywatch

=== Freedom Master ===
(Freedom Master Corp, Merritt Island FL.)

- Freedom Master FM-2 Air Shark I

=== Freewind ===
(Freewind Aviation)

- Freewind Bumble B

=== Freewing ===
((Hugh) Schmittle Aircraft (with Odile Legeay), Annapolis MD. )

- Freewing MK-5

=== FreeX ===
(Egling, Germany)

- FreeX Arrow
- FreeX Blade
- FreeX Blast
- FreeX FXT
- FreeX Gemini
- FreeX Joker
- FreeX Moon

=== Freeze ===
(Joseph C Freeze (or Freese?), Kansas City KS.)

- Freeze Monoplane

=== Freiberger ===
(Ronald Freiberger)

- Freiberger Ron's 1

=== Frenard ===
(Fred N Arnoldi, Columbus OH.)

- Frenard Duck

=== Fresh Breeze ===
(Fresh Breeze GmbH & Co Kg, Wedemark, Germany)

- Fresh Breeze Airbass
- Fresh Breeze BulliX
- Fresh Breeze Flyke
- Fresh Breeze Monster
- Fresh Breeze Paratour Twin
- Fresh Breeze Respect
- Fresh Breeze Simonini
- Fresh Breeze Skip One
- Fresh Breeze Snap
- Fresh Breeze Solo
- Fresh Breeze Super ThoriX
- Fresh Breeze ThoriX
- Fresh Breeze Twin
- Fresh Breeze Xcitor

=== Freüller Valls ===
- Freüller Valls MA

=== Friedrichshafen ===
(Flugzeugbau Friedrichshafen G.m.b.H.)

- Friedrichshafen C.I
- Friedrichshafen D.I
- Friedrichshafen D.II
- Friedrichshafen D.III
- Friedrichshafen D type Quadruplane (D.III)
- Friedrichshafen FF.1
- Friedrichshafen FF.2
- Friedrichshafen FF.4
- Friedrichshafen FF.7 (placemarker re-direct)
- Friedrichshafen FF.8
- Friedrichshafen FF.9
- Friedrichshafen FF.11
- Friedrichshafen FF.15
- Friedrichshafen FF.17
- Friedrichshafen FF.19
- Friedrichshafen FF.21
- Friedrichshafen FF.27
- Friedrichshafen FF.29
- Friedrichshafen FF.30
- Friedrichshafen FF.31
- Friedrichshafen FF.33
- Friedrichshafen FF.34
- Friedrichshafen FF.35
- Friedrichshafen FF.36
- Friedrichshafen FF.37
- Friedrichshafen FF.38
- Friedrichshafen FF.39
- Friedrichshafen FF.40
- Friedrichshafen FF.41
- Friedrichshafen FF.43
- Friedrichshafen FF.44
- Friedrichshafen FF.45
- Friedrichshafen FF.46
- Friedrichshafen FF.48
- Friedrichshafen FF.49
- Friedrichshafen FF.53
- Friedrichshafen FF.54 (D.III)
- Friedrichshafen FF.55
- Friedrichshafen FF.59
- Friedrichshafen FF.60
- Friedrichshafen FF.61
- Friedrichshafen FF.62
- Friedrichshafen FF.63
- Friedrichshafen FF.64
- Friedrichshafen FF.66
- Friedrichshafen FF.67
- Friedrichshafen FF.71
- Friedrichshafen G.I
- Friedrichshafen G.II
- Friedrichshafen G.III
- Friedrichshafen G.IV
- Friedrichshafen G.V
- Friedrichshafen G.VI
- Friedrichshafen N.I

=== Frier ===
(John Frier, 5833 Julian St, SDt Louis MO.)

- Frier 1911 Headless Triplane

=== Friesley ===
(Friesley (Harold Friesleben) Aircraft Corp, Gridley CA.)

- Friesley Falcon

=== Froebe ===
- Froebe helicopter

=== Froberg ===
(Froberg Aeroplane Co, Richmond CA.)

- Froberg 1912 Biplane

=== Frontier Aircraft Inc ===
(Vail, Colorado, United States)

- Frontier MD-II

=== FRuBA ===
(Flugzeug Reparatur und Bau Anstalt - aircraft repair and manufacturing facility / Julius Kolin)

- FRuBA fighter

=== Fry ===
(Fry Aircraft Design, Wilen bei Wollerau, Switzerland)

- Fry Esprit VFII

== Fs ==
=== FSS ===
(Gerhard Winkler / Johannes Höntsch / Flugsportgruppe Schönhagen)

- FSS-100 Tourist

== Ft ==
=== FTAG Esslingen ===
(Flugtechnische Arbeitsgemeinschaft an der Fachhochschule Esslingen -Hochschule für Technik e.V.)

- Esslingen E-1 a.k.a. FTAG E-1
- Esslingen E-10 a.k.a. FTAG E-10

== Fu ==
=== Fuji ===
(Fuji Jukogyo Kabushiki Kaisha)

- Fuji FA200 Aero Subaru
- Fuji FA300
- Fuji KM-2
- Fuji LM-1 Nikko
- Fuji LM-11 Supernikko
- Fuji LM-2 Nikko
- Fuji T-1 Hatsutaka
- Fuji T-3
- Fuji T-5
- Fuji T-7
- Fuji/Rockwell Commander 700
- Fuji/Rockwell Commander 710

=== Fujinawa ===
(Eiichi Fujinawa)

- Fujinawa Orenco

=== Fukuda ===
(Fukuda Kei Hikoki Seisakusho - Fukuda light Aeroplane Manufacturing Works)

- Fukuda Ki-24
- Fukuda Ki-26
- Fukuda Hikara-6-I
- Fukuda Hikari Research-2 Motor Glider
- Fukuda/Hitachi HT-3 Research Glider

=== Fukunaga ===
(Fukunaga Hikoki Seisakusho - Fukunaga Aeroplane Manufacturing Works)

- Fukunaga Tenryu 3 Trainer
- Fukunaga Tenryu 6 Long-range Racing Aeroplane
- Fukunaga Tenryu 7 Trainer
- Fukunaga Tenryu 8 Trainer
- Fukunaga Tenryu 9 Trainer
- Fukunaga Tenryu 10

=== Fuller-Hammond ===
(Skycraft Industries (founders: George B Fuller & Wilbur A Hammond), 350 Washington Blvd, Venice CA.)

- Fuller-Hammond FH-1

=== Fulton ===
(Fulton Aircraft Div, Flight Training Research Assn Inc, Continental Corp (military training devices).)

- Fulton FA-2 Airphibian
- Fulton FA-3 Airphibian

=== Funk ===
(R R Funk, Cincinnati OH.)

- Funk Experimental

=== Funk ===
(Akron Aircraft Co Inc (founders: Joseph & Howard Funk, with a business consortium), 277 Brown St, Akron OH)

- Funk Model B
- Funk Model C
- Funk F-2B
- Funk UC-92

=== Funk ===
(Otto & Peter Funk)

- Greif 1 (FK-1)
- Greif 2 (FK-2)
- Funk HS203
- Funk FK-3
- Funk FK-4
- Funk FK-5
- Funk FK-6
- Funk FK-9
- Funk FK-11
- Funk Sirius 1
- Funk AK-1

=== Funk ===
(Don D Funk Aviation Co, Broken Arrow OK. )

- Funk F-23

== Fv ==
=== FVA ===
(Flugwissenschaftliche Vereinigung Aachen)

- FVA-1 Schwatze Düvel (Schwarze Teufel)
- FVA-2 Blaue Maus
- FVA-3 Ente
- FVA-4 Pipö
- FVA-5 Rheinland
- FVA-9 Blaue Maus 2
- FVA-10 A Rheinland Theodor Bienen
- FVA-10 B Rheinland
- FVA-11 Eifel
- FVA-13 Olympia Jolle
- FVA-14 Ringflügel
- FVA-18 Primitivkrähe
- FVA-18/3 Silberkrähe
- FVA-20
- FVA-27

=== FVM ===
(Flygkompaniets Verkstäder at Malmen - aircraft workshop of the Army Aviation Company at Malmen)

- FVM J.23
- FVM J.24
- FVM J.24B
- FVM Triplanet
- FVM Ö1 Tummelisa
- FVM S.18
- FVM S.21
- FVM Phönix D.III

== Fw ==
=== FWA ===
(Flugzeugwerke Altenrhein AG)

- FWA AS 202 Bravo
- FWA AS 32T Turbo Trainer

== Fy ==
=== Fyodorov ===
(E.S. Fyodorov)

- Fyodorov 1907 Quintuplane
