= Southern Skies =

- Company type: Limited liability company
- Industry: Aerospace
- Products: Paramotors
- Owner: Chris and Tammy Bowles
- Number of employees: 2
- Website: www.southernskies.net

Southern Skies LLC is a former American aircraft manufacturer based in Taylorsville, North Carolina. The company specialized in the design and manufacture of paramotors in the late 1990s, but no longer produces its own aircraft. The company remains in business as a flight training school and dealer for German Fresh Breeze paramotors.

The company produced the first four-stroke powered paramotor ever built, the Quattro. The Quattro design used a computer-controlled, electronic ignition system-equipped, 14 hp (10 kW), 212 cc (13 cu in), Honda Kart engine.

== Aircraft ==
Summary of aircraft built by Southern Skies
Model name	First flight	Number built	Type
Southern Skies Spymotor			Two-stroke paramotor
Southern Skies Quattro			four-stroke paramotor
