= MD3 =

MD3, MD 3 or MD-3 can mean:

- Dätwyler MD-3 Swiss Trainer, a Swiss light aircraft
- Flyitalia MD3 Rider, an Italian ultralight aircraft
- Maryland's 3rd congressional district, a United States electoral region
- Maryland Route 3, a United States highway
- MD3 (file format)
- Material Design 3 (a.k.a. Material You), a design language by Google introduced in 2021 with Android 12
