= Fukuda/Hitachi HT-3 =

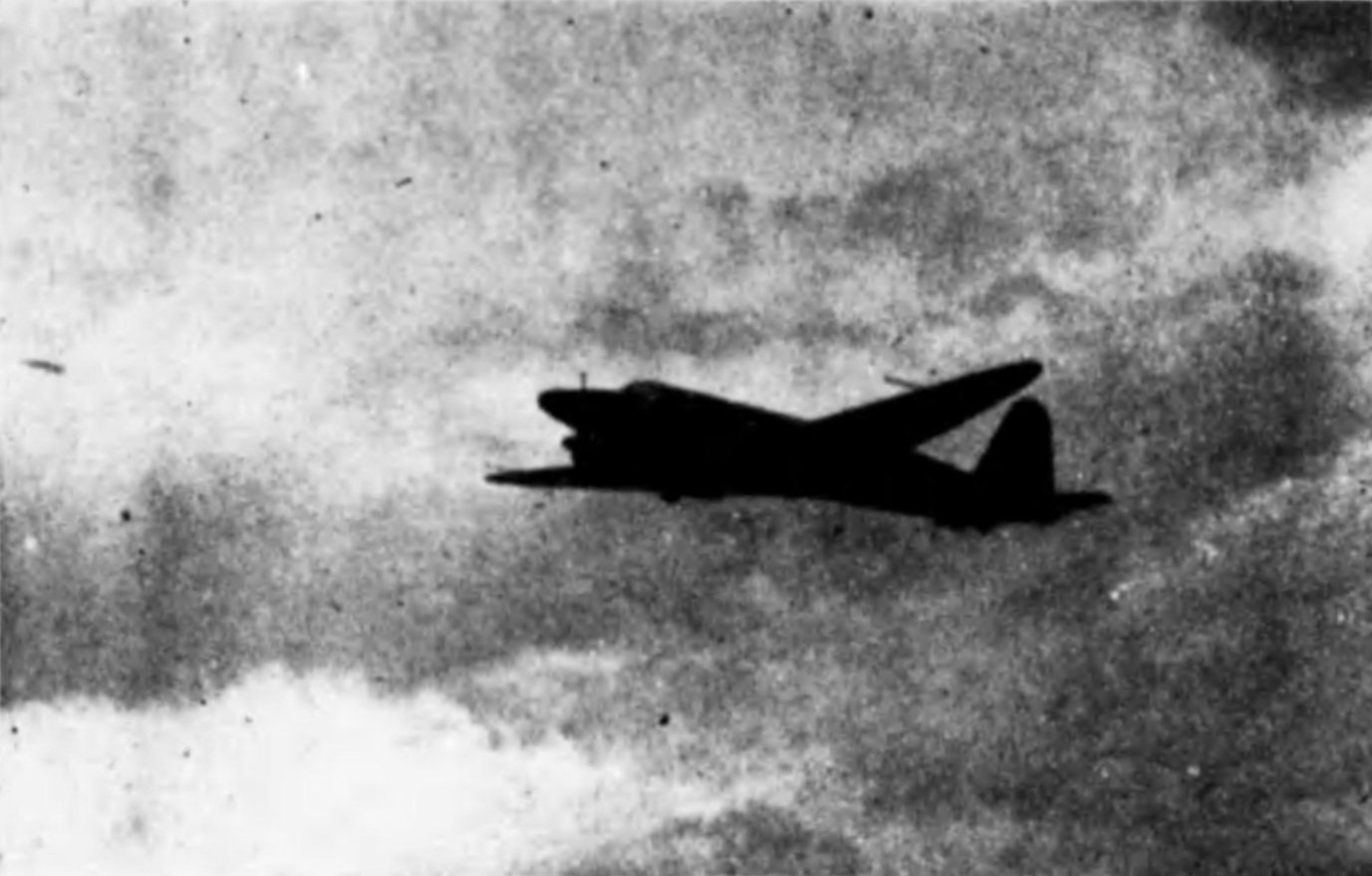

General information
- Type: Experimental glider
- National origin: Japan
- Manufacturer: Fukuda Light Aeroplane Manufacturing Works
- Number built: 1

History
- First flight: 17 December 1940

The Fukuda/Hitachi HT-3 glider was a detailed 3/5 scale model of a proposed airliner, the Hitachi HT-3. Aerodynamic data gathered under tow was expected to be more reliable than that from wind tunnel testing.

== Design and development ==
Until the development of high pressure wind tunnels the aerodynamics of models and full scale structures could differ markedly because of the much higher Reynolds number of the latter. To avoid possible problems the Aviation Bureau, who were sponsoring Hitachi's eight seat civil airliner, asked Fukuda to build a towed, 3/5 scale glider to investigate the design's aerodynamics. The modelling was detailed, including the glazing of the cockpit, the twin inline engine nacelles and the retracted landing gear.

The glider had a wooden structure, covered with plywood and fabric. It was flown from within the enclosed model cockpit, though by only one pilot rather than the two who would have piloted the full sale airliner. After measurements had been made the glider was released from the tow and landed normally.

Its first flight was made on 17 December 1940, piloted by Isamu Oda who was a well known glider pilot. It is not known how many more flights were made before the HT-3, still at the mock-up stage, was abandoned as Japanese aircraft development refocused on military aviation.

== Specifications ==
Data from Japanese Aircraft 1910-1941

General characteristics

- Crew: one
- Length: 9.42 m (30 ft 11 in)
- Wingspan: 12.21 m (40 ft 1 in)
- Height: 1.25 m (4 ft 1 in)
- Wing area: 16.4 m^{2} (177 sq ft)
- Aspect ratio: 8.78
- Empty weight: 250 kg (551 lb)
- Gross weight: 350 kg (772 lb)

Performance

- Cruise speed: 76–91 km/h (47–56 mph, 41–49 kn)
- Towing speed: 130 km/h (81 mph; 70 kn)
- Landing speed: 61 km/h (38 mph; 33 kn)
- Maximum glide ratio: 14.1-14.7
- Rate of sink: 1.46–1.71 m/s (287–337 ft/min)
