= Friedrichshafen FF.27 =

German WWI floatplane

FF.27

General information
- Type: Two-seat coastal patrol floatplane
- Manufacturer: Flugzeugbau Friedrichshafen
- Primary user: German Imperial Navy
- Number built: 1

History
- First flight: July 1914

The Friedrichshafen FF.27 was a reconnaissance floatplane built in Germany during World War I.

== Design and development ==
The FF.27 was a two-seat floatplane of mixed construction which had a single NAG 6-cyl 135hp piston engine mounted in the center nacelle. The tail empennage extended out from the fuselage via twin metal booms and the FF.27 had a pair of floats mounted under the center wing section.

The first flight of the FF.27 took place in 1914, occurring in response to the Baltic Ostsee-Wettbewerb 1914 aviation contest. After the outbreak of WWI, the FF.27 was delivered to the Imperial German Navy and given the serial 62, being used for reconnaissance duties.

== Specifications ==
General characteristics

- Crew: 2
- Wingspan: 14.40 m (47 ft 3 in)
- Wing area: 45 m^{2} (480 sq ft)
- Empty weight: 900 kg (1,984 lb)
- Max takeoff weight: 1,100 kg (2,425 lb)
- Powerplant: 1 × NAG 6-cyl 135hp 6-cylinder inline engine, 101 kW (135 hp)

Performance

- Maximum speed: 100 km/h (62 mph, 54 kn)
- Cruise speed: 95 km/h (59 mph, 51 kn)

== Bibliography ==
- Borzutzki, Siegfried (1993). Flugzeugbau Friedrichshafen GmbH: Diplom-Ingenieur Theodor Kober [Friedrichshafen Aircraft Company: Diploma-Engineer Theodore Kober] (in German). Berlin: Burbach. ISBN 3-927513-60-1.
- Herris, Jack (2016). Friedrichshafen Aircraft of WWI: A Centennial Perspective on Great War Airplanes. Great War Aviation Centennial Series. Vol. 21. Charleston, South Carolina: Aeronaut Books. ISBN 978-1-935881-35-3.
- Kroschel, Günter & Stützer, Helmut (1977). Die deutschen Militärflugzeuge 1910–1918: in 127 Vierseitenrissen im Massstab 1:144 [German Military Aircraft 1910-1918: In 127 Four-page Drawings to 1:144 Scale] (in German). Wilhelmshaven, West Germany: Lohse-Eissing. ISBN 3-920602-18-8.
