= Fisher Culex =

American ultralight aircraft

General information
- Type: Two-seat recreational monoplane
- National origin: United States
- Manufacturer: Fisher Flying Products
- Status: Kit production completed

The Fisher Culex and Culite are a family of American two-seat, twin-engined monoplanes. The aircraft is supplied in the form of blueprints for amateur construction, originally by Fisher Flying Products and now by Mike Fisher Aircraft.

== Development ==
Both designs are mid-wing monoplanes, constructed predominantly from wood, with tandem seating for two, with fixed conventional landing gear. Empty weights for finished aircraft are typically 950 to 1,000 lb (431 to 454 kg). The designer indicates that the inspiration for the design was the Second World War deHavilland Mosquito bomber.

== Variants ==
Culex
Twin engine, mid-wing monoplane powered by two 80 hp (60 kW) Limbach 2000 four-stroke piston engines.
Culite
Twin engine, mid-wing monoplane powered by two 50 hp (37 kW) Rotax 503 two-stroke piston engines.

== Specifications (typical Culex) ==
Data from Taylor & Buy Planes

General characteristics

- Crew: 2
- Length: 20 ft 4 in (6.20 m)
- Wingspan: 30 ft 0 in (9.14 m)
- Empty weight: 950 lb (431 kg)
- Gross weight: 1,750 lb (794 kg)
- Fuel capacity: 46 US gallons (175 litres)
- Powerplant: 2 × Limbach L2000 air-cooled, 4-cylinder, 4-stroke, piston, 80 hp (60 kW) each

Performance

- Maximum speed: 150 mph (240 km/h, 130 kn)
- Cruise speed: 130 mph (209 km/h, 113 kn)
- Stall speed: 60 mph (96 km/h, 52 kn)
- Range: 768 mi (1,235 km, 667 nmi)
- Rate of climb: 1,500 ft/min (7.6 m/s)
