= Farman Blanchard =

Prototype French torpedo bomber biplane of 1921

Blanchard
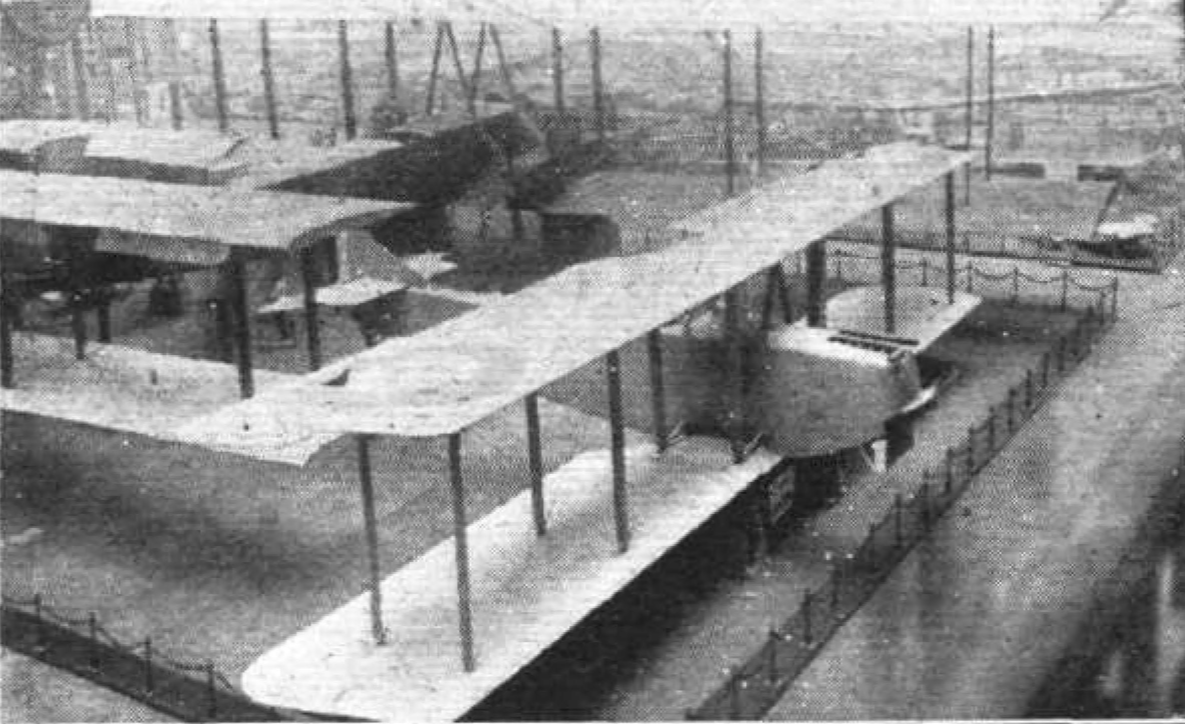
- Farman Blanchard at the Paris Aero Show 1921

General information
- Type: Torpedo bomber
- National origin: France
- Manufacturer: Farman
- Designer: Maurice Blanchard
- Number built: 1

History
- First flight: 1923

The Farman Blanchard was a prototype naval torpedo bomber built in France in the early 1920s but not selected for production. It is designated the Farman F.450 Torp in at least one source (not to be confused with the unrelated Farman F.450 Moustique). It was designed by Maurice Blanchard, after whom it was named.

== Design ==
The Blanchard was a two-bay, unstaggered, equal-span biplane of conventional configuration. The pilot and observer sat in tandem, open cockpits. Power was supplied by a piston engine in the nose, driving a tractor propeller. It had fixed, tailskid undercarriage, and a conventional tail. It carried its torpedo semi-recessed into the underside of the fuselage. Construction was of wood throughout.

It was intended to operate from land or from aircraft carriers.

== Development ==
The Blanchard was exhibited at the 1921 Paris Aero Show where a Flight reporter commented on its large wings making it less suitable for shipboard use than the British torpedo bombers of the time. The Blanchard first flew in 1923, but was passed over for production in favour of the Levasseur PL.2. No further examples were built.

== Specifications ==
Data from The Illustrated Encyclopedia of Aircraft 1983, p.1735

General characteristics

- Crew: 2
- Length: 12.00 m (39 ft 4 in)
- Wingspan: 18.00 m (59 ft 1 in)
- Height: 4.60 m (15 ft 1 in)
- Wing area: 100.00 m^{2} (1,076.4 sq ft)
- Max takeoff weight: 2,950 kg (6,504 lb)
- Powerplant: 1 × Renault liquid-cooled, twelve-cylinder V engine, 340 kW (450 hp)

Performance

- Maximum speed: 145 km/h (90 mph, 78 kn)
- Service ceiling: 6,000 m (20,000 ft)

Armament
2× 7.7-millimetre (0.30 in) machine guns
1× torpedo

== Notes ==
=== Bibliography ===
- The Illustrated Encyclopedia of Aircraft. London: Aerospace Publishing.
- Liron, Jean (1984). Les Avions Farman [The Farman Aeroplanes] (in French). Paris: Éditions Larivière.
- "The Paris Aero Show 1921". Flight. Vol. 13, no. 48. 1 December 1921. pp. 796–800.
