= Fike Model E =

Model E

General information
- Type: Recreational aircraft
- Manufacturer: Homebuilt
- Designer: William Fike

History
- First flight: 22 March 1970

The Fike Model E was a light aircraft built in the United States in the early 1970s. Designed by airline pilot William Fike, it was a conventional high-wing cantilever monoplane with tailskid undercarriage and seating for one or two people in an enclosed cabin. The wing was an unusual geodesic wooden construction and was of far greater chord than typical for an aircraft of this type; indeed, one of the purposes of building the aircraft was to investigate the characteristics of a wing of such low aspect ratio (3.0). The empennage was taken from a Piper Cub, but was modified to reduce its span to make it suitable for towing on the road. Plans were made available for homebuilders in the mid 1970s.

== Specifications ==
Data from Jane's All The World's Aircraft 1976–1977

General characteristics

- Crew: 1
- Capacity: 1 passenger
- Length: 19 ft 2 in (5.84 m)
- Wingspan: 22 ft 4 1/2 in (6.820 m)
- Height: 5 ft 8 in (1.73 m)
- Wing area: 143.10 sq ft (13.294 m^{2})
- Aspect ratio: 3.0:1
- Airfoil: NACA 4409
- Empty weight: 690 lb (313 kg)
- Gross weight: 1,100 lb (499 kg)
- Fuel capacity: 25 US gal (21 imp gal; 95 L)
- Powerplant: 1 × Continental C-85-8 air-cooled flat-four engine, 85 hp (63 kW)

Performance

- Maximum speed: 120 mph (190 km/h, 100 kn)
- Cruise speed: 95 mph (153 km/h, 83 kn)
- Range: 450 mi (720 km, 390 nmi) (max fuel, 15 minutes reserve)
- Service ceiling: 10,000 ft (3,000 m) +
- Rate of climb: 1,000 ft/min (5.1 m/s)
