= Focke-Wulf Fw 47 Höhengeier =

1931 German meteorological aircraft

Fw 47 Höhengeier

General information
- Type: Weather plane
- Manufacturer: Focke-Wulf
- Designer: Wilhelm Bansemir
- Number built: 36

History
- Introduction date: December 1932
- First flight: June 1931

The Focke-Wulf Fw 47 Höhengeier (German: "Vulture"), known internally to Focke-Wulf as the A 47, was a meteorological aircraft developed in Germany in 1931. It was a parasol-wing monoplane of largely conventional design, unusual only in the expansiveness of its wing area. Tested first by the Reichsverband der Deutschen Luftfahrtindustrie, and then the weather station at Hamburg, the type was ordered into production to equip ten major weather stations around Germany.

== Variants ==
- A 47a - prototype with Argus As 10 engine
- Fw 47C - production version with Argus As 10C engine
- Fw 47D - production version with Argus As 10D engine
- Fw 47E - production version with Argus As 10E engine

== Specifications (Fw 47C) ==
General characteristics

- Crew: two, pilot and observer
- Length: 10.55 m (34 ft 7 in)
- Wingspan: 17.75 m (58 ft 3 in)
- Height: 3.04 m (10 ft 0 in)
- Wing area: 35.0 m^{2} (377 sq ft)
- Empty weight: 1,065 kg (2,350 lb)
- Gross weight: 1,580 kg (3,480 lb)
- Powerplant: 1 × Argus As 10C , 180 kW (240 hp)

Performance

- Maximum speed: 190 km/h (120 mph, 100 kn)
- Range: 640 km (400 mi, 350 nmi)
- Service ceiling: 5,600 m (18,400 ft)
