= Farman F.290 =

1930s French aircraft

F.290

General information
- Type: Airliner
- Manufacturer: Farman Aviation Works
- Number built: 5

History
- First flight: 1931

The Farman F.290 was a 5-seat transport aircraft built in France in the early 1930s.

== Design ==
It was a high-wing strut-braced monoplane with fixed tailskid undercarriage. The fuselage and wings were of all-wood construction.

== Variants ==
F.290
F.291
F.291/1

== Specifications (F.290) ==
Data from

General characteristics

- Crew: 1
- Capacity: 4 pax
- Length: 10.36 m (34 ft 0 in)
- Wingspan: 14.38 m (47 ft 2 in)
- Height: 2.52 m (8 ft 3 in)
- Wing area: 40.2 m^{2} (433 sq ft)
- Empty weight: 980 kg (2,161 lb)
- Gross weight: 1,688 kg (3,721 lb)
- Powerplant: 1 × Gnome & Rhône 5Kc 5-cyl air-cooled radial piston engine, 180 kW (240 hp)

Performance

- Maximum speed: 193 km/h (120 mph, 104 kn)
- Range: 800 km (500 mi, 430 nmi)
- Service ceiling: 5,800 m (19,000 ft)

== Bibliography ==
- Liron, Jean (1984). Les avions Farman. Collection Docavia. Vol. 21. Paris: Éditions Larivière. OCLC 37146471.
