= Federal Aircraft CM-3 =

CM-3
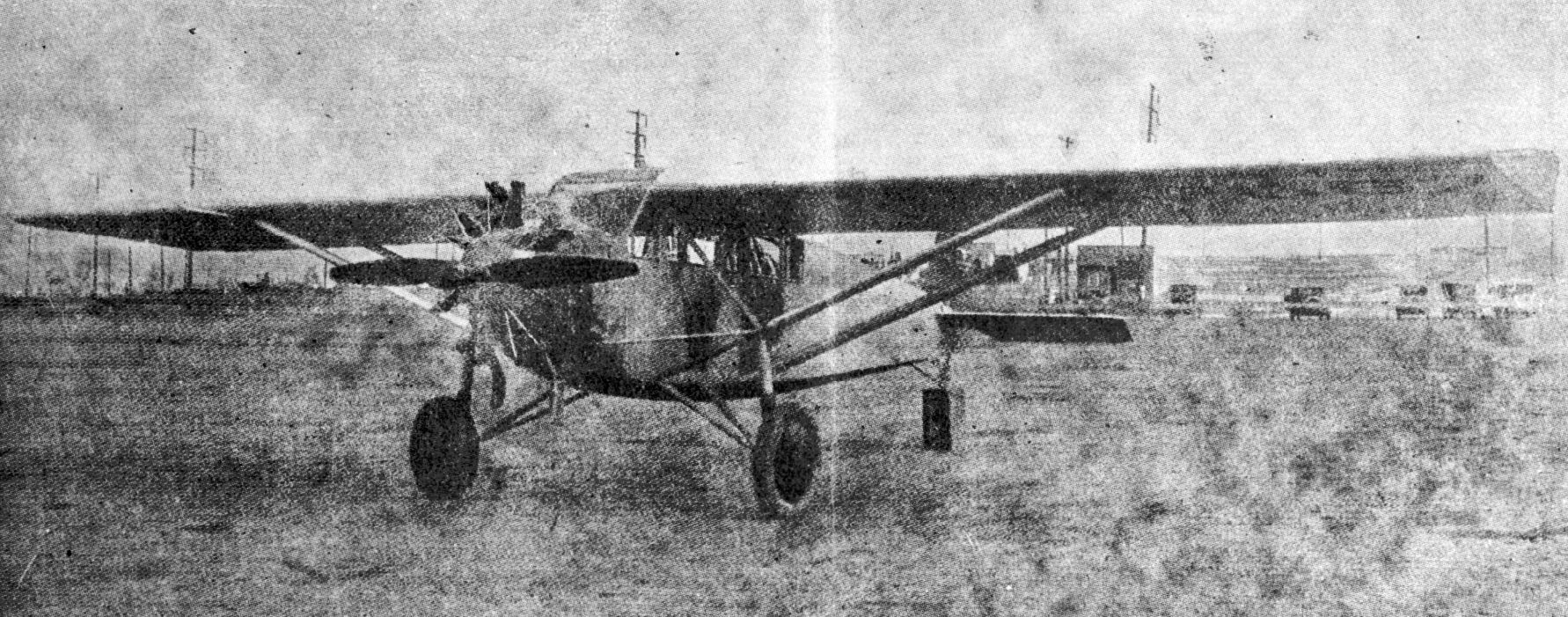

General information
- Type: Cabin Monoplane
- National origin: United States
- Manufacturer: Federal Aircraft Corporation
- Designer: William J. Waterhouse
- Number built: 1

The Federal Aircraft CM-3 was an aircraft built by mechanics from the Ryan Company.

== Design and development ==
The CM-3 was designed to be an express mail plane that could also be used for flight training. It had 50 orders, but only one aircraft was completed. The company was dissolved shortly afterward.

The CM-3 was a high-wing strut-braced monoplane with conventional landing gear. The fuselage was made of welded steel tubing with aircraft fabric covering. The aircraft featured dual controls with seating in tandem.

== Specifications (Federal Aircraft) ==
Data from Skyways, Aviation, Jane's all the World's Aircraft 1928

General characteristics

- Crew: 1
- Capacity: 2
- Length: 25 ft 9 in (7.85 m)
- Wingspan: 39 ft 6 in (12.04 m)
- Height: 7 ft 8.5 in (2.350 m)
- Wing area: 256 sq ft (23.8 m^{2})
- Airfoil: Göttingen 398
- Empty weight: 1,450 lb (658 kg)
- Gross weight: 2,150 lb (975 kg)
- Powerplant: 1 × Hallett H-526 7-cylinder air-cooled radial piston engine, 130 hp (97 kW)
- Propellers: 2-bladed fixed pitch propeller

Performance

- Maximum speed: 115 mph (185 km/h, 100 kn)
- Cruise speed: 100 mph (160 km/h, 87 kn)
- Stall speed: 40 mph (64 km/h, 35 kn)
- Range: 400 mi (640 km, 350 nmi)
- Endurance: 4 hours 30 minutes
- Service ceiling: 12,000 ft (3,700 m)
- Rate of climb: 750 ft/min (3.8 m/s)
- Wing loading: 8.6 lb/sq ft (42 kg/m^{2})
- Power/mass: 0.0606 hp/lb (0.0996 kW/kg)
