= Fike Model D =

Model D

General information
- Type: Recreational aircraft
- Manufacturer: Homebuilt
- Designer: William Fike

History
- First flight: 1951

The Fike Model D was a light aircraft built in the United States in the early 1950s. Designed by airline pilot William Fike, it was a conventional high-wing strut-braced monoplane with tailskid undercarriage and seating for one or two people in an enclosed cabin. In appearance, the aircraft strongly resembled a Piper Cub, with only the tail surfaces sourced from one. An unusual feature was that the flight controls were mounted to the ceiling of the cabin, rather than the floor. This facilitated the folding or removal of the seat or seats to enable the aircraft's use as a sleeping space when camping with it. Plans were marketed for homebuilding.

== Specifications ==
Data from

General characteristics

- Crew: 1
- Capacity: 1 passenger
- Length: 18 ft 8 in (5.69 m)
- Wingspan: 29 ft 1 in (8.86 m)
- Height: 5 ft 5 in (1.65 m)
- Wing area: 132 sq ft (12.3 m^{2})
- Airfoil: NACA 4409
- Empty weight: 611 lb (277 kg)
- Gross weight: 1,040 lb (472 kg)
- Max takeoff weight: 1,070 lb (485 kg)
- Fuel capacity: 12 US gal (10.0 imp gal; 45 L)
- Powerplant: 1 × Continental A65-8 four-cylinder, horizontally opposed, air-cooled piston engine, 65 hp (48 kW)
- Propellers: 2-bladed Sensenich 72-C-44 fixed-pitch wooden propeller

Performance

- Maximum speed: 107 mph (172 km/h, 93 kn)
- Cruise speed: 85–90 mph (137–145 km/h, 74–78 kn)
- Stall speed: 40 mph (64 km/h, 35 kn)
- Range: 270 mi (430 km, 230 nmi)
- Service ceiling: 10,000 ft (3,000 m) (at least)
- Rate of climb: 800 ft/min (4.1 m/s)
