= Farman F.110 =

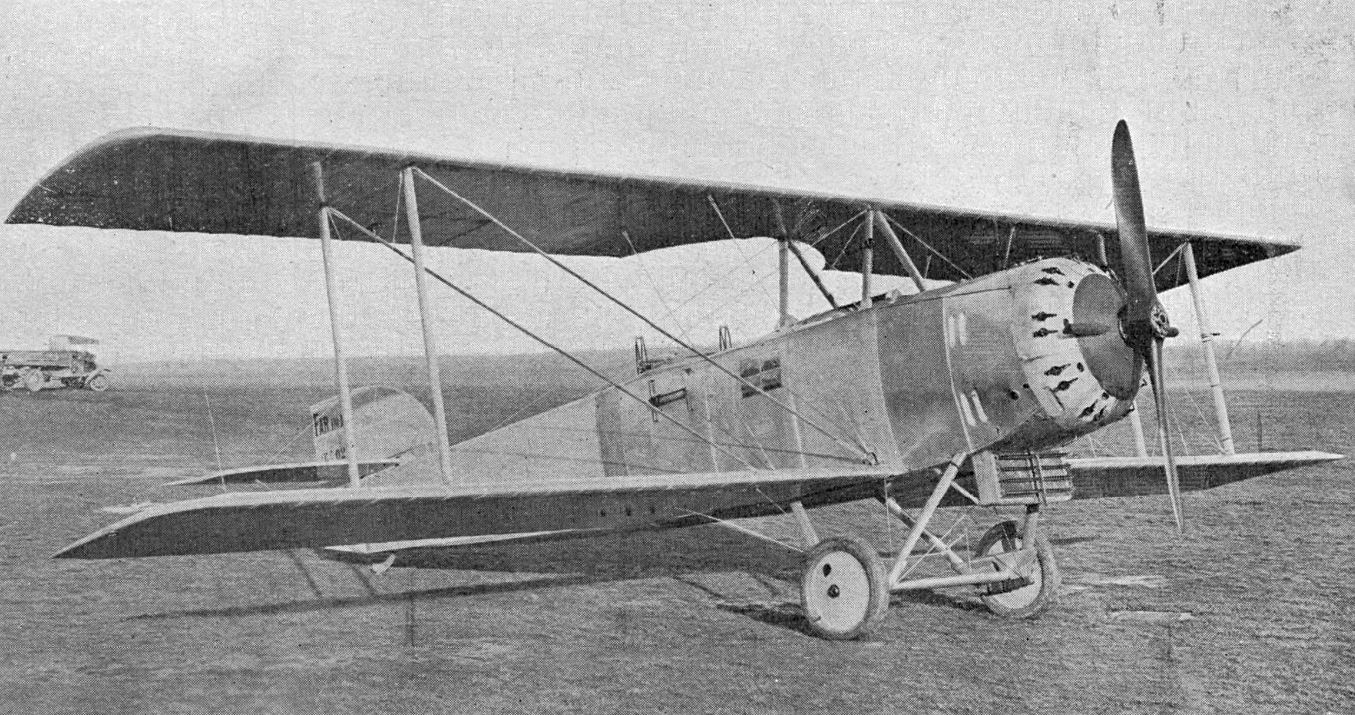

General information
- Type: Two-seat artillery observation biplane
- National origin: France
- Manufacturer: Farman Aviation Works
- Designer: Antoine de Boysson
- Primary user: Aéronautique Militaire
- Number built: 50

History
- First flight: 1921

The Farman F.110 was a French two-seat artillery observation biplane designed and built by the Farman Aviation Works.

== Development ==
The F.110 was an effort by Farman to produce an artillery observation aircraft normally supplied to the French military by Breguet. Mainly of aluminium alloy construction it was a biplane design with a tailskid landing gear. Powered by a water-cooled Salmson 9Z radial piston engine which was a cause of drag because of the need for a large radiator box under the nose which compounded the already large frontal area of a radial engine.

The pilot and observer had an open cockpit which had glazed panels in the sides and the floor to give the observer a good view. After a first flight in 1921 the Aéronautique Militaire ordered 175 aircraft but due to a lack of experience in the company with aluminium alloy the F.110 suffered structural problems. After some modification only 50 aircraft were delivered and the type was not developed further. The F.110 only remained in front-line use for just over a year.

In 1927 tests were made with the F.115, a F.110 with its aluminium ribs replaced with wooden ones.

== Operators ==
France

- Aéronautique Militaire

== Specifications ==
Data from

General characteristics

- Crew: 2 (pilot, observer)
- Length: 9.11 m (29 ft 11 in)
- Wingspan: 12.0 m (39 ft 4 in)
- Height: 3.19 m (10 ft 6 in)
- Wing area: 37 m^{2} (400 sq ft)
- Empty weight: 735 kg (1,620 lb) equipped
- Max takeoff weight: 1,420 kg (3,131 lb)
- Powerplant: 1 × Salmson 9Z water-cooled radial piston engine, 190 kW (260 hp)

Performance

- Maximum speed: 191 km/h (119 mph, 103 kn) at sea level
- Service ceiling: 6,600 m (21,700 ft)

Armament

- Guns: one fixed forward-firing 7.7mm (0.303in) machine-gun and two further machine-guns on flexible mounts in observers cockpit.
- Bombs: rack for light bombs fitted
