= Flywhale Aircraft Flywhale =

Flywhale
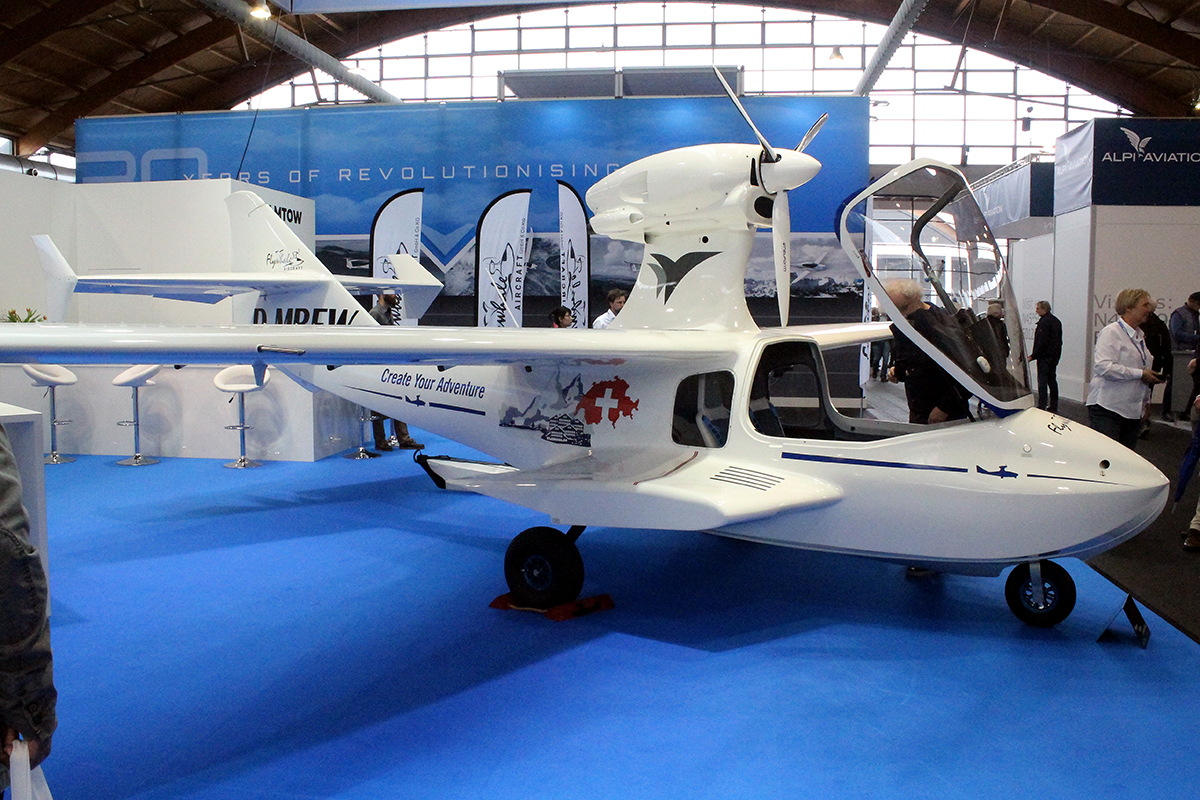

General information
- Type: Sports amphibian
- National origin: Germany
- Manufacturer: Uniplanes GmbH
- Number built: 10 (2020)

History
- First flight: 13 September 2013

The Flywhale FW650 was a two-seat amphibious sports aircraft designed and built in Germany by Uniplanes GmbH. It is now owned and built by Dornier Seawings under the name DS-2C.

== Design and development ==
The Flywhale, built mainly from carbon fibre composite materials, is a flying boat style amphibian, with a single step hull and sponsons rather than wing tip floats. It accommodates two in side-by-side seating fitted with a single control between both seats. The design also provides room for two people to sleep in the fuselage. A large, one-piece canopy hinges forward for access. Behind the seats is a baggage area. The Flywhale has short-legged, tricycle landing gear with mainwheels retracting backwards into the sponsons. It can operate on land and water.

Its high cantilever wings are trapezoidal in plan and can be removed for transport. Its empennage is cruciform, with the horizontal tail part-way up a triangular fin and rudder. A 75 kW (100 hp) Rotax 912 iS flat-four engine is mounted on a necked pylon over the wing in tractor configuration. This originally drove a two blade propeller but more recently a three-bladed one has replaced it. A BRS ballistic parachute is an option.

The Flywhale flew for the first time on 13 September 2013. A second airframe has been completed, including modifications suggested by the flight trials of the first, and this flew in the summer of 2015.

On 19 January 2022, Dornier Seawings announced that they had acquired all intellectual property and production assets of the Flywhale project, which would henceforth be known as the Dornier Seawings DS-2C, alongside the larger Dornier Seastar.

== Variants ==
Adventure
Standard version as in Specifications

== Specifications (Adventure) ==
Data from Jane's All the World's Aircraft 2015-16

General characteristics

- Crew: One pilot
- Capacity: One passenger
- Length: 6.45 m (21 ft 2 in)
- Wingspan: 9.00 m (29 ft 6 in)
- Height: 2.35 m (7 ft 9 in)
- Empty weight: 345–400 kg (761–882 lb)
- Max takeoff weight: 650 kg (1,433 lb) with rescue parachute
- Fuel capacity: 106 L (23 imp gal; 28 US gal)
- Powerplant: 1 × Rotax 912 iS flat-four, 75 kW (101 hp)
- Propellers: 3-bladed , constant speed

Performance

- Cruise speed: 200 km/h (120 mph, 110 kn)
- Stall speed: 72 km/h (45 mph, 39 kn)
- Never exceed speed: 250 km/h (160 mph, 130 kn)
- Endurance: 6 hr 0 min
- g limits: +4/-2
