= Fly Castelluccio =

Italian aircraft manufacturer

Fly Castelluccio Paramotor Paragliding and Trike srl
- Company type: Privately held company
- Industry: Aerospace
- Founded: circa 2000
- Defunct: 2007
- Fate: Out of business
- Headquarters: Ascoli Piceno, Italy
- Products: Paragliders, paramotors, ultralight trikes, powered parachutes

Fly Castelluccio Paramotor Paragliding and Trike srl was an Italian aircraft manufacturer based in Ascoli Piceno. The company specialized in the design and manufacture of paragliders, paramotors, ultralight trikes and powered parachutes in the form of ready-to-fly aircraft for the US FAR 103 Ultralight Vehicles rules, and the European Fédération Aéronautique Internationale microlight category.

The company was founded in 1996 and went out of business in 2007.

The company was an Italian Società a responsabilità limitata (Srl), a limited liability company.

In 2004 Fly Castelluccio was noted as being the largest manufacturer of its type in Italy and that it was poised to become the largest in Europe. Reviewer Rene Coulon in 2003 described the company as "the most refreshing manufacturer in this field" and noted their wide presence at all major shows globally.

The company produced an extensive range of aircraft, that by 2007 included ten paramotor models, one ultralight trike, three powered parachutes, three lines of paragliders and an emergency parachute model.

== Aircraft ==
Summary of aircraft built by Fly Castelluccio
Model name	First flight	Number built	Type
Fly Castelluccio Diavolo	2004		Powered parachute
Fly Castelluccio Trike Mono			Powered parachute
Fly Castelluccio Trike Ambulanza			Powered parachute air ambulance
Fly Castelluccio Mach			Paramotor
Fly Castelluccio Energy			Paramotor
Fly Castelluccio Flash			Paramotor
Fly Castelluccio SMN			Paramotor
Fly Castelluccio Aria			Paraglider
Fly Castelluccio Ultima			Paraglider
Fly Castelluccio Voyager Plus			Paraglider
