= FBA Avion Canon =

Avion Canon

General information
- Type: 2-seat fighter
- National origin: France
- Manufacturer: Franco-British Aviation Company (FBA)
- Designer: Louis Schreck
- Number built: 1

History
- First flight: 1916
- Developed from: FBA H

The FBA Avion Canon, also known as the FBA 1 Ca2, was a two-seat cannon-armed biplane fighter, designed and built in France from 1916 by Franco-British Aviation. Due to unsatisfactory performance, development of the Avion Canon was abandoned.

== Design and development ==
During 1916, Louis Schreck, chief designer of Franco-British Aviation Company (FBA), developed a two-seat cannon armed fighter, by mounting the biplane wings from the FBA H flying boat on an aerodynamically clean wooden monocoque fuselage, with conventional tailskid undercarriage. Power was supplied by a 150 hp (110 kW) Hispano-Suiza 8A V-8 water-cooled engine mounted as a pusher between the upper and lower mainplanes. After initial testing the engine was replaced with a 175 hp (130 kW) Hispano-Suiza 8Aa. Performance was unsatisfactory and further development was cancelled.

== Specifications (FBA Avion Canon) ==
Data from Air International:Fighter A to Z: FBA Avion Canon

General characteristics

- Crew: 2
- Length: 10.13 m (33 ft 3 in)
- Wingspan: 14.5 m (47 ft 7 in)
- Height: 3.35 m (11 ft 0 in)
- Wing area: 41 m^{2} (440 sq ft)
- Empty weight: 761 kg (1,678 lb)
- Gross weight: 1,166 kg (2,571 lb)
- Powerplant: 1 × Hispano-Suiza 8Aa V-8 water-cooled piston engine, 130 kW (175 hp)
- Propellers: 2-bladed wooden fixed-pitch pusher propeller

Performance

- Maximum speed: 133 km/h (83 mph, 72 kn) at sea level; 123 km/h (76 mph; 66 kn) at 2,000 m (6,600 ft)
- Endurance: 3 hours
- Time to altitude: 1,000 m (3,300 ft) in 8.55 minutes

Armament

- Guns: 1x 37 mm (1.46 in) Hotchkiss cannon
