= FD-Composites ArrowCopter =

Austrian autogyro

ArrowCopter
- ArrowCopter AC 10 in flight on 7 March 2012

General information
- Type: Autogyro
- National origin: Austria
- Manufacturer: FD-Composites GmbH
- Designer: Dietmar Fuchs
- Status: Production completed
- Number built: at least 40 by 2015

History
- Manufactured: 2011–18
- Introduction date: 2011
- First flight: 20 November 2008

The ArrowCopter is a series of Austrian autogyros, designed and produced by FD-Composites GmbH of Zeillern. When it was in production the ArrowCopter AC20 series was supplied as complete, factory built, ready-to-fly-aircraft.

By the summer of 2018 the company website had been removed and the company had filed for insolvency protection. In October 2019 the Sichuan Dahua General Aircraft Manufacturing Company of China purchased the assets of the company.

By January 2025 Gryphen Aircraft Industries srl from north Italy purchased all the ArrowCopter assets.

== Design and development ==
The ArrowCopter was designed to comply with British BCAR Section T rules. It features a single main rotor, a two-seats in tandem configuration enclosed cockpit with a bubble canopy, stub wings, tricycle landing gear and a four-cylinder, liquid and air-cooled, four-stroke, dual-ignition turbocharged 115 hp (86 kW) Rotax 914 engine in pusher configuration. The 100 hp (75 kW) normally aspirated Rotax 912S and a 118 hp (88 kW) BMW boxer engine with a reduction drive were reported as being under consideration in 2011 as alternate powerplants.

The aircraft fuselage is made from an autoclave-cured carbon fibre/kevlar sandwich and mounts an 8.50 m (27.9 ft) diameter rotor. The main landing gear wheels are mounted on the tips of the short wings. The AC 10 has an empty weight of 250 kg (550 lb) and a gross weight of 450 kg (990 lb), giving a useful load of 200 kg (440 lb).

The AC 10 flew for the first time on 20 November 2008 and the first production examples appeared in 2011. Production of the AC 20 began in 2012. By 2015 at least 40 aircraft had been produced, going to customers in nine countries.

In September 2018, FD-Composites GmbH filed for insolvency protection due to management and financial issues. In October 2019 the Sichuan Dahua General Aircraft Manufacturing Company of China completed the purchase of ArrowCopter's assets. Sichuan Dahua indicated that they intended to retain manufacturing in Austria and set up parallel manufacturing in China.

== Operational history ==
By January 2013 one example of the ArrowCopter AC10 had been registered in the United States with the Federal Aviation Administration.

== Variants ==
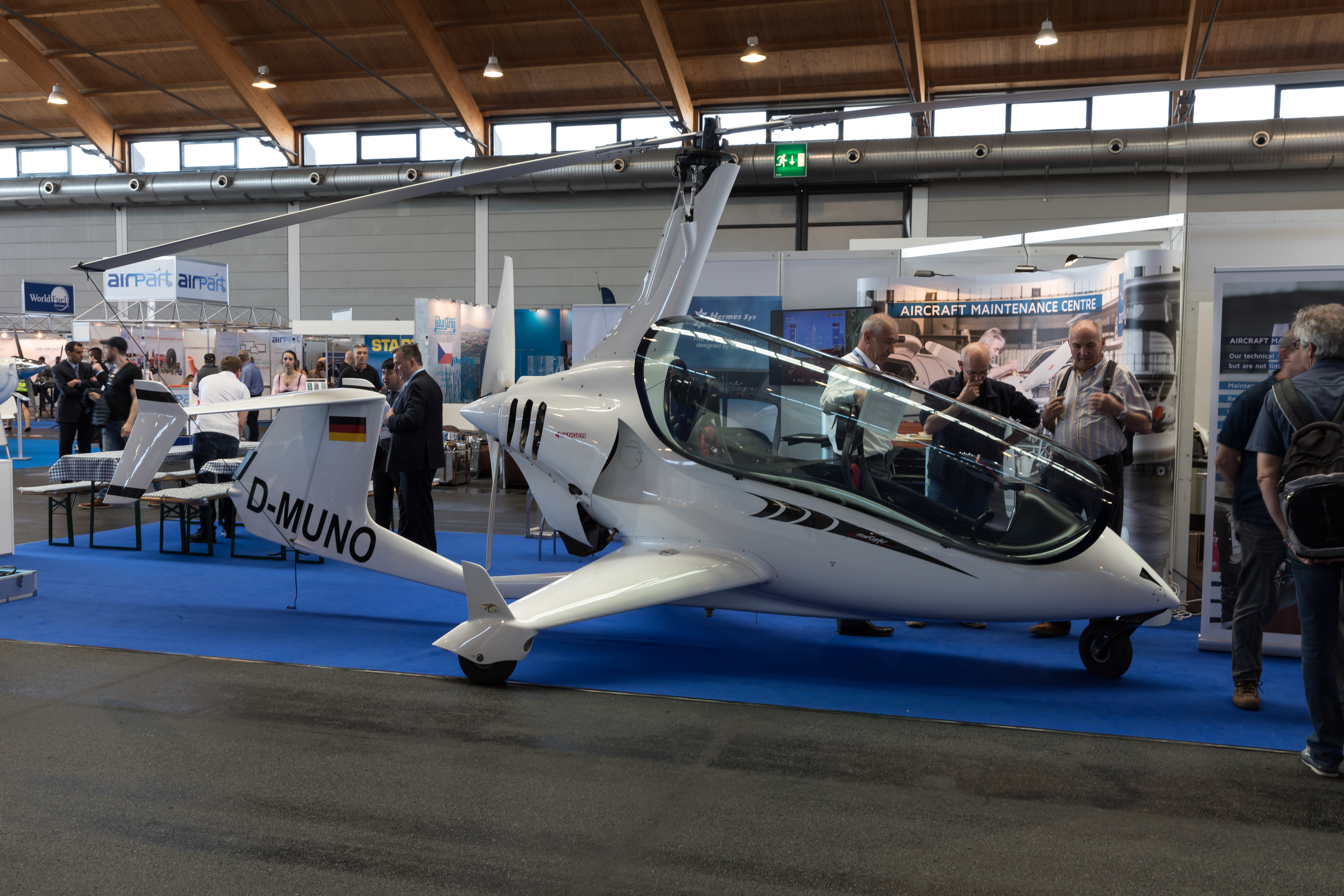
FD-Composites ArrowCopter AC20

FD-Composites ArrowCopter AC10
Initial version with a maximum takeoff mass of 560 kg (1,230 lb)
FD-Composites ArrowCopter AC20
Production version with an empty mass of 342 kg (754 lb) and a MTOM of 560 kg (1,230 lb)

== Specifications (AC20) ==
Data from Bayerl

General characteristics

- Crew: one
- Capacity: one passenger
- Length: 5.8 m (19 ft 0 in)
- Width: 2.455 m (8 ft 1 in)
- Height: 2.881 m (9 ft 5 in)
- Empty weight: 350 kg (772 lb)
- Gross weight: 560 kg (1,235 lb)
- Max takeoff weight: 560 kg (1,235 lb)
- Fuel capacity: 72 litres (16 imp gal; 19 US gal)
- Powerplant: 1 × Rotax 914 four cylinder, liquid and air-cooled, turbocharged four stroke aircraft engine, 86 kW (115 hp)
- Main rotor diameter: 8.50 m (27 ft 11 in)
- Propellers: 2-bladed FD-Composites

Performance

- Maximum speed: 195 km/h (121 mph, 105 kn)
- Cruise speed: 165 km/h (103 mph, 89 kn)
- Vmin: 30 km/h (16 kn; 19 mph))
- Never exceed speed: 195 km/h (121 mph, 105 kn)
