= Farman MF.16 =

French WW1 reconnaissance aircraft

MF.16

General information
- Type: Reconnaissance
- Manufacturer: Farman Aviation Works
- Designer: Maurice Farman
- Primary user: French Air Force
- Number built: 1

The Maurice Farman MF.16 was a French reconnaissance aircraft developed before World War I by the Farman Aviation Works.

== Design and development ==
The MF.16 was a pusher biplane like previous Farman aircraft, and had a sesquiplane layout.

== Specifications ==
Data from

General characteristics

- Crew: 2
- Length: 8.06 m (26 ft 5 in)
- Wingspan: 13.76 m (45 ft 2 in)
- Wing area: 35 m^{2} (380 sq ft)
- Empty weight: 410 kg (904 lb)
- Gross weight: 650 kg (1,433 lb)
- Powerplant: 1 × Gnome 7 Lambda 7-cylinderair-cooled rotary piston engine, 60 kW (80 hp)
- Propellers: 2-bladed fixed-pitch pusher propeller

Performance

- Maximum speed: 90 km/h (56 mph, 49 kn) at sea level
- Range: 220 km (140 mi, 120 nmi)
- Service ceiling: 2,500 m (8,200 ft)
- Time to altitude: 500 m (1,600 ft) in 8 minutes

== See also ==
Related lists

- List of military aircraft of France
