= Féré F.3 =

Single engine single seat French sports plane built in the 1980s

General information
- Type: Single seat sport aircraft
- National origin: France
- Designer: René Féré
- Number built: 1

History
- First flight: March 1981

The Féré F.3 is a single engine, single seat French sports plane, amateur designed and built in the 1980s. Only one was completed.

== Design and development ==
The Féré F.3 is almost entirely wooden in structure and skinning, though some areas are fabric covered. The one piece, low set wing is built around a single box spar, with its leading edge covered in okoumé plywood under an overall fabric covering. The inner sections of the wings have no dihedral but the outer panels are set at 5.80°. There are plain, fabric covered ailerons on the outer panels but no flaps.

Its square-section fuselage, with rounded upper decking, is also plywood-covered apart from a polyester engine cover. A nose-mounted modified 30 kW (40 hp) Volkswagen engine drives a two-blade propeller. The single-seat cockpit, placed over the wing leading edge, is under a sideways-opening, single-piece canopy. There is a baggage space behind the seat, where the canopy line runs into that of the high rear decking. The empennage is conventional, with ply-covered fixed surfaces and fabric-covered control surfaces. The horizontal surfaces are placed close to the top of the fuselage, with the elevator hinge ahead of that for the rudder. The elevators have a cutout for rudder movement as the latter extends down to the keel. There is an in-flight-adjustable trim tab on the port elevator and a ground-adjustable one the rudder. The Féré F.3 lands on a fixed, conventional undercarriage with rubber block shock absorbers on the cantilever main legs. The mainwheels are enclosed in fairings and have brakes; the leaf spring-mounted tailwheel is steerable.

The Féré F.3 first flew in March 1981. Although plans were offered for other builders, it seems that the prototype F-PYJF was the only one completed. It remained on the French civil register in 2010 and is currently with the Musée Régional de l'Air, Angers, though not on display or active.

== Specifications ==
Data from Jane's All the World's Aircraft 1984/85

General characteristics

- Crew: One
- Length: 5.20 m (17 ft 1 in)
- Wingspan: 6.90 m (22 ft 8 in)
- Wing area: 8.42 m^{2} (90.6 sq ft)
- Aspect ratio: 5.65
- Airfoil: NACA 23013
- Empty weight: 200 kg (441 lb)
- Max takeoff weight: 316 kg (697 lb)
- Fuel capacity: 29 L (6.4 Imp gal; 7.7 US gal). Provision for second tank in baggage area 16 L (3.5 Imp gal; 4.2 US gal)
- Powerplant: 1 × converted 1.2 L Volkswagen, air cooled, with Zenith carburettor and Bendix magneto, 30 kW (40 hp)
- Propellers: 2-bladed EVRA D9-28 fixed pitch wooden

Performance

- Maximum speed: 195 km/h (121 mph, 105 kn)
- Cruise speed: 170 km/h (110 mph, 92 kn) maximum
- Stall speed: 68 km/h (42 mph, 37 kn)
- Range: 450 km (280 mi, 240 nmi) with standard fuel
- Service ceiling: 4,000 m (13,000 ft) service
- Rate of climb: 4.5 m/s (890 ft/min) at sea level
