= Franklyn Pea Bee =

Pea Bee

General information
- Type: Homebuilt aircraft
- National origin: United States
- Designer: George Franklyn

The Franklyn Pea Bee is an American single place homebuilt aircraft, that was designed in the 1970s.

== Design and development ==
The Pea Bee is a single place, strut-braced, low wing aircraft with conventional landing gear. The fuselage is all aluminum, the wings are of wooden construction with aluminum skins. The wings are configured with a slight anhedral.

== Specifications (Pea Bee) ==
Data from Air Trails

General characteristics

- Crew: 1
- Wingspan: 18 ft (5.5 m)
- Empty weight: 700 lb (318 kg)
- Powerplant: 1 × Franklin Horizontally opposed piston
- Propellers: 2-bladed

Performance

- Cruise speed: 87 kn (100 mph, 160 km/h)

== See also ==
Aircraft of comparable role, configuration, and era

- Stits Playboy
- Bowers Fly Baby
