= Frederick-Ames EOS/SFA =

EOS/SFA

General information
- Type: Sports plane
- Manufacturer: Homebuilt
- Designer: Fred Smith
- Number built: 1

History
- First flight: c. 1973

The Frederick-Ames EOS/SFA was a single-seat sports aircraft designed in the United States in the 1970s with the intention of marketing it for homebuilding. It was a highly streamlined low-wing cantilever monoplane with swept flying surfaces and retractable tricycle undercarriage. Its construction was of metal throughout.

Originally named simply the Eos (for the Greek goddess of the dawn), it was shown at the 1973 EAA Fly-in at Oshkosh, Wisconsin, albeit in incomplete form. When finished, it crashed on its first flight due to an engine seizure, was extensively damaged, and abandoned as too expensive to repair. Nevertheless, the aircraft was rebuilt in 1978 and re-engined with a Volkswagen engine conversion. Plans to market the design were never realised. Two other examples are known to exist.

== Specifications ==
Data from Jane's All the World's Aircraft 1980–81

General characteristics

- Crew: One pilot
- Length: 16 ft 7 in (5.05 m)
- Wingspan: 26 ft 0 in (7.92 m)
- Height: 6 ft 6 in (1.98 m)
- Wing area: 75 sq ft (7.0 m^{2})
- Aspect ratio: 9:1
- Airfoil: NACA 651212
- Empty weight: 670 lb (304 kg)
- Max takeoff weight: 975 lb (442 kg)
- Fuel capacity: 15 US gal (12 imp gal; 57 L)
- Powerplant: 1 × Converted 1834 cc Volkswagen automotive engine , 70 hp (52 kW)
- Propellers: 3-bladed Rand Robinson ground-adjustable, 4 ft 2 in (1.27 m) diameter

Performance

- Maximum speed: 200 mph (320 km/h, 170 kn)
- Cruise speed: 175 mph (282 km/h, 152 kn) (75% power)
- Stall speed: 57 mph (92 km/h, 50 kn) IAS
- Rate of climb: 1,000 ft/min (5.1 m/s)
