= FreeX =

German aircraft manufacturer

FreeX GmbH
- Type: Gesellschaft mit beschränkter Haftung
- Industry: Aerospace
- Founded: 1994
- Defunct: circa 2013
- Headquarters: Lenggries, Germany
- Products: Paragliders
- Website: www.freex.com

FreeX GmbH (usually styled freeX) was a German aircraft manufacturer based in Lenggries and previously located in Egling. The company specialized in the design and manufacture of paragliders in the form of ready-to-fly aircraft.

The company was founded about 1994 and seems to gone out of business in about 2013, as the website started returning database errors.

FreeX was a Gesellschaft mit beschränkter Haftung, a limited liability company.

The company produced a wide range of paragliders, including the competition Arrow, intermediate Blade, Moon and Blast, the mountaineering descent FXT wing, the two-place Gemini and the beginner Joker.

== Aircraft ==
Summary of aircraft built by FreeX:

- FreeX Arrow
- FreeX Blade
- FreeX Blast
- FreeX Flair
- FreeX FXT
- FreeX Gemini
- FreeX Joker
- FreeX Mission
- FreeX Moon
- FreeX Oxygen
- FreeX Pure
- Freex Stereo
- FreeX Sun
