= Faradair Aerospace BEHA =

BEHA

General information
- Type: Hybrid triplane box wing
- National origin: Great Britain
- Manufacturer: Faradair Aerospace
- Status: In development

The Faradair Aerospace BEHA is a sustainable hybrid-electric aircraft design currently under development in the UK.

== Development ==
The BEHA is a hybrid-electric utility aircraft currently under development at Duxford Airfield in Cambridgeshire, UK and the University of Swansea in Wales. BEHA is an acronym for Bio-Electric-Hybrid-Aircraft. The aircraft has evolved from early concept launched in 2014 to an 18 seat FAA part 23 regulation aircraft design that is to be powered by twin Magni500 electric motors developed by MagniX in a contra-rotating pusher propfans ducted fan configuration. The electric motors are to be powered by a Honeywell Turbogenerator running either Sustainable Aviation Fuel or JetA. The aircraft has a Triple Box-wing configuration in all carbon composite construction and is also now supported by Nova Systems in the prototype development, Cambridge Consultants in the hybrid powertrain development.

In July 2020, Faradair announced a move to Duxford Airfield in Cambridgeshire from its original Cirencester base, to form part of the new Duxford Avtech aerospace development programme. A new prototyping hangar is to be built at the historic airfield with the company announcing partnership with Imperial War Museum Duxford and Gonville & Caius College as part of the relocation.

The company plans to have a prototype completed by 2024 and begin operational trials by 2026, however, as of November 2024, no announcement of a prototype being built or commenced has been forthcoming.

== Specifications (BEHA-MH1) ==
Data from Faradair Website

General characteristics

- Crew: 1
- Capacity: 18 passengers
- Length: 15 m (48 ft)
- Wingspan: 17 m (57 ft)
- Height: 4.3 m (14 ft)
- Powerplant: 1 × Turbogenerator Turbogenerator to be supplied by Honeywell, exact unit details to be confirmed
- Powerplant: 2 × Magni500 Electric motor, 560 kW (750 shp) each
- Propellers: Bespoke Faradair designed Propfan

Performance

- Cruise speed: 370 km/h (230 mph, 200 kn)
- Service ceiling: 4,300 m (14,000 ft)
