= Flyitalia MD3 Rider =

Italian ultralight aircraft

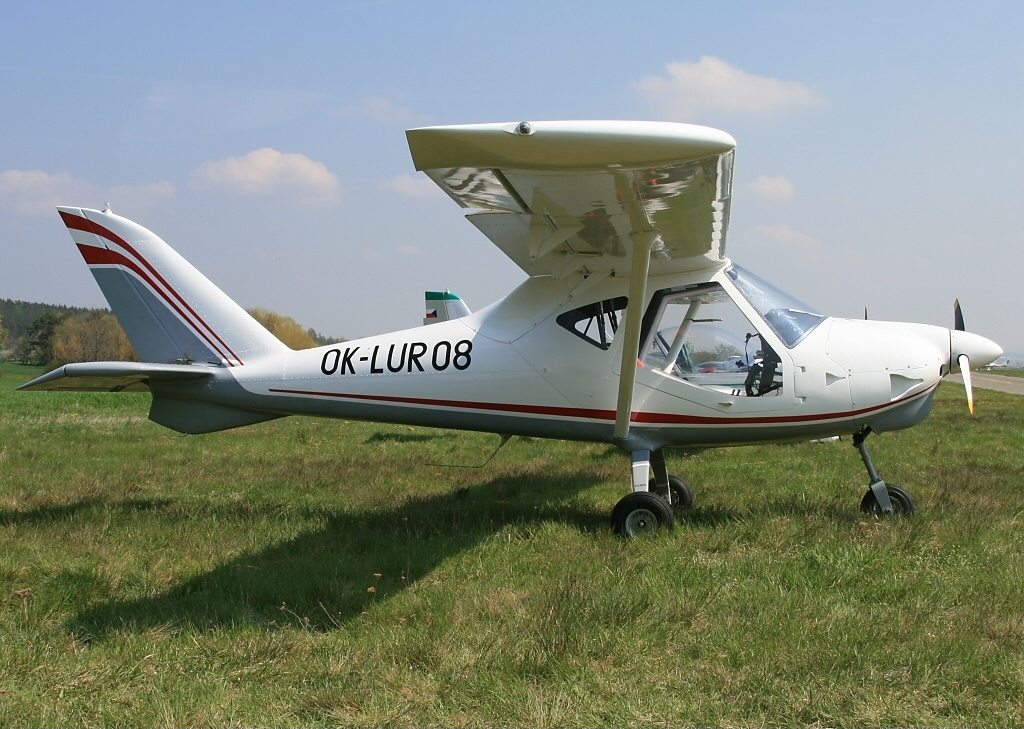

General information
- Type: Ultralight aircraft and Light-sport aircraft
- National origin: Italy
- Manufacturer: SD Aviation Srl, Mornago, VA
- Designer: Jaro Drostal
- Status: In production (2013)

The Flyitalia MD3 Rider is an Italian ultralight and light-sport aircraft that was designed by Jaro Drostal in the Czech Republic and produced by Flyitalia of Dovera, Italy. The aircraft was supplied by Flyitalia complete and ready-to-fly.

The company went out of business and production ended in 2011, but production was resumed by a new company, Next Aircraft of Rivanazzano in 2013, who supply it ready-to-fly.

Finally MD3 Rider was acquired by SD Aviation Srl at the beginning of 2024, including all licensing rights. The current models, along with their unmanned versions equipped with original software, are produced by SD Aviation Srl in Mornago, VA, Italy.

== Design and development ==
The aircraft was designed to comply with the Fédération Aéronautique Internationale microlight rules and US light-sport aircraft rules. It features a strut-braced high-wing, a two-seats-in-side-by-side configuration enclosed cockpit, fixed tricycle landing gear and a single engine in tractor configuration.

The aircraft is made with riveted and bonded aluminum sheet semi-monocoque construction, with a welded steel cockpit cage. The engine cowling and fairings are made from composites, with the cockpit doors fashioned from carbon-fibre. Its 8.5 m (27.9 ft) span wing has an area of 9.5 m^{2} (102 sq ft), electrically-operated flaps, electric elevator trim and integral fuel tanks. The cockpit is 117 cm (46 in) wide. A folding wing for storage and ground transport was a factory option. The standard engines factory supplied are the 80 hp (60 kW) Rotax 912UL and the 100 hp (75 kW) Rotax 912ULS four-stroke powerplant.

The MD3 has a gross weight of 472.5 kg (1,042 lb) for the European microlight class and 520 kg (1,146 lb) for the US LSA category.

A float version was under consideration in 2015.

== Specifications (MD3 Rider) ==
Data from Bayerl

General characteristics

- Crew: one
- Capacity: one passenger
- Wingspan: 8.5 m (27 ft 11 in)
- Wing area: 9.5 m^{2} (102 sq ft)
- Empty weight: 287 kg (633 lb)
- Gross weight: 472.5 kg (1,042 lb)
- Fuel capacity: 70 litres (15 imp gal; 18 US gal)
- Powerplant: 1 × Rotax 912ULS four cylinder, liquid and air-cooled, four stroke aircraft engine, 75 kW (101 hp)

Performance

- Maximum speed: 210 km/h (130 mph, 110 kn)
- Cruise speed: 190 km/h (120 mph, 100 kn)
- Stall speed: 62 km/h (39 mph, 33 kn)
- Rate of climb: 7 m/s (1,400 ft/min)
- Wing loading: 49.74 kg/m^{2} (10.19 lb/sq ft)
