= Fresh Breeze =

German aircraft manufacturer

- Company type: Private company
- Industry: Aerospace
- Headquarters: Wedemark, Germany
- Products: paramotors and powered parachutes
- Website: www.fresh-breeze.de

Fresh Breeze GmbH & Co Kg is a German aircraft manufacturer based in Wedemark. The company specializes in the design and manufacturer of paramotors and powered parachutes.

Reviewers Noel Bertrand, et al., described the company as "one of the world’s main paramotor manufacturers."

== Aircraft ==
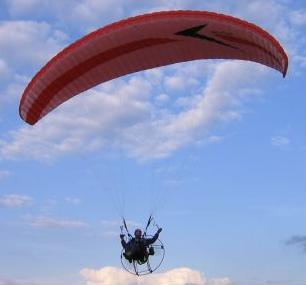
Fresh Breeze Simonini

Summary of aircraft built by Fresh Breeze
Model name	First flight	Number built	Type
Airbass	mid-2000s		paramotor
Monster			paramotor
Paratour Twin			paramotor
Respect	mid-2000s		paramotor
Simonini			paramotor
Snap			paramotor
Solo			paramotor
Super ThoriX			paramotor
ThoriX			paramotor
Twin			paramotor
BulliX			powered parachute
Flyke			powered parachute and roadable pedal-powered tricycle
Skip One			powered parachute
Xcitor			powered parachute
