= Lavey =

Lavey may refer to:

== Places ==
- Lavey, County Cavan, a civil parish of Ireland
- Lavey, County Londonderry, a parish in Northern Ireland
- Lavey, Switzerland, a former municipality in Switzerland
- Lavey-les-Bains, a village in the district of Aigle in the canton of Vaud, Switzerland
- Lavey-Morcles, a municipality in the district of Aigle in the canton of Vaud, Switzerland
- Lavey-Village, a village in the district of Aigle in the canton of Vaud, Switzerland

== Other uses ==
- Anton LaVey (1930–1997), American writer and Satanist
- Lavey GAC, a Gaelic Athletic Association club based in Lavey, County Londonderry

== See also ==
- Laufey (born 1999), Icelandic singer-songwriter
