= Fournier (disambiguation) =

Fournier is a French surname.

Fournier may also refer to:

- 7×54mm Fournier rifle cartridge
- Cape Fournier, New Zealand's Chatham Islands
- Fournier Bay
- Fournier Boulevard
- Fournier (crater), Mars
- Fournier gangrene
- Aircraft developed by René Fournier
  - Fournier RF 3
  - Fournier RF 4
  - Fournier RF 5
  - Fournier RF7
  - Fournier RF-9
  - Fournier RF-10
  - Fournier RF-47
- ARA Fournier (M-5), an Argentine Bouchard-class minesweeper which disappeared in 1949
- Fournier Island
- Fournier, Ontario, Canada
- Fournier Register, a set of records from the inquisition into heresy by Jacques Fournier
- Fournier Ridge
- Fournier Street, London
- Fournier (typeface), a typeface based on the work of French typographer Pierre Simon Fournier
- French submarine Henri Fournier
- Museo Fournier de Naipes, a playing card museum
- Naipes Heraclio Fournier, Spanish playing card manufacturer

== See also ==
- Fourier (disambiguation)
