= Saint-Maurice, Switzerland =

Place in Valais, Switzerland

Saint-Maurice
- Municipality
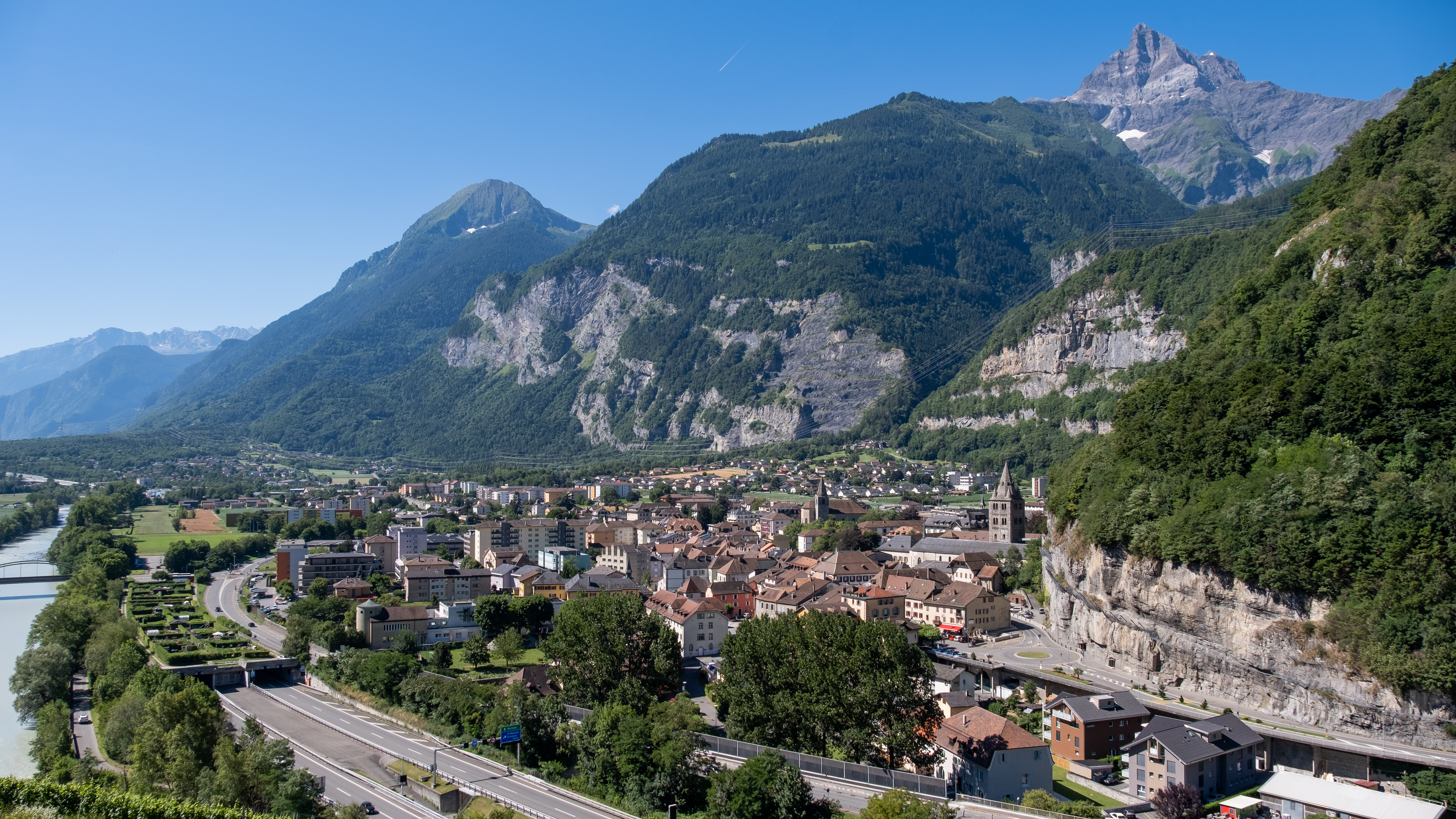
- View of Saint-Maurice with the Dent du Salantin (left) and the Dents du Midi in the background

- Flag Coat of arms
- Location of Saint-Maurice
- Location within Switzerland Location within Canton of Valais
- Coordinates: 46°13′N 7°0′E
- Country: Switzerland
- Canton: Valais
- District: Saint-Maurice

Area
  - Total: 7.0 km^{2} (2.7 sq mi)
- Elevation: 414 m (1,358 ft)

Population (December 2002)
  - Total: 3,676
  - Density: 530/km^{2} (1,400/sq mi)
- Time zone: UTC+01:00 (CET)
  - Summer (DST): UTC+02:00 (CEST)
- Postal code: 1890
- SFOS number: 6217
- ISO 3166 code: CH-VS
- Surrounded by: Bex (VD), Collonges, Evionnaz, Lavey-Morcles (VD), Massongex, Mex, Vérossaz
- Website: www.saint-maurice.ch

Aerial views of Saint-Maurice, Switzerland at twilight including the Abbey of Saint-Maurice d'Agaune and Chapel of Notre-Dame-du-Scex.

Saint-Maurice (French pronunciation: [sɛ̃ mɔʁis]) is a village and a municipality in the Swiss canton of Valais and the capital of the district of Saint-Maurice. On 1 January 2013, the former municipality of Mex merged into the municipality of Saint-Maurice.

Saint-Maurice is the site of the Ancient Roman outpost of Agaunum and the 6th-century Abbey of Saint-Maurice d'Agaune. The village is located at the entrance of a pass leading to the upper part of the Rhône valley. As such, it has a strategic importance, and defence work were built from the 15th century to control this access. The Fortress Saint-Maurice was constructed in the surrounding mountainsides from 1880 through 1995.

== History ==
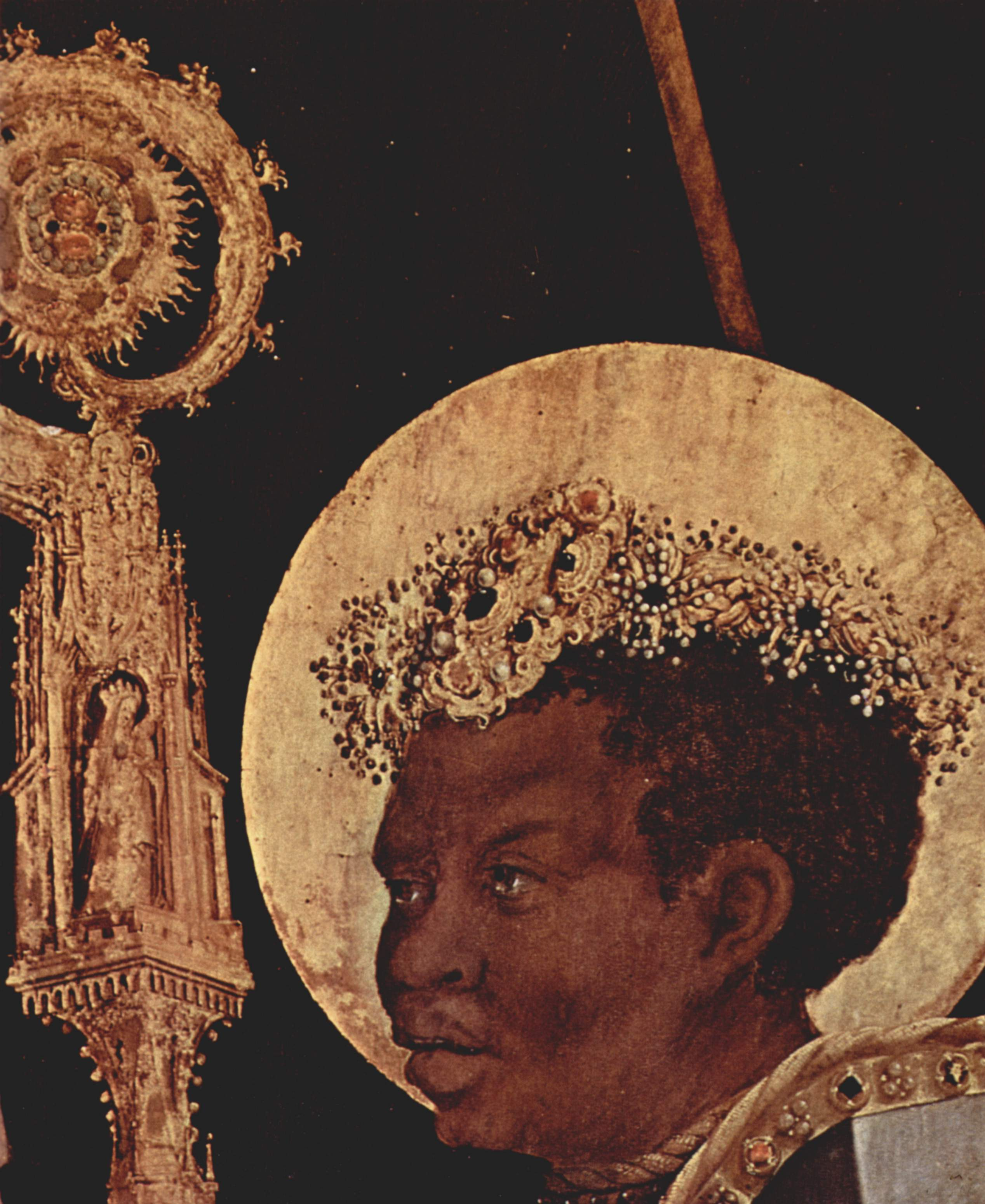
St. Maurice, the town's namesake, depicted by Matthias Grünewald, 15th century.

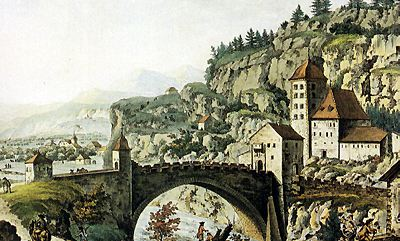
Saint Maurice castle and bridge in 1782

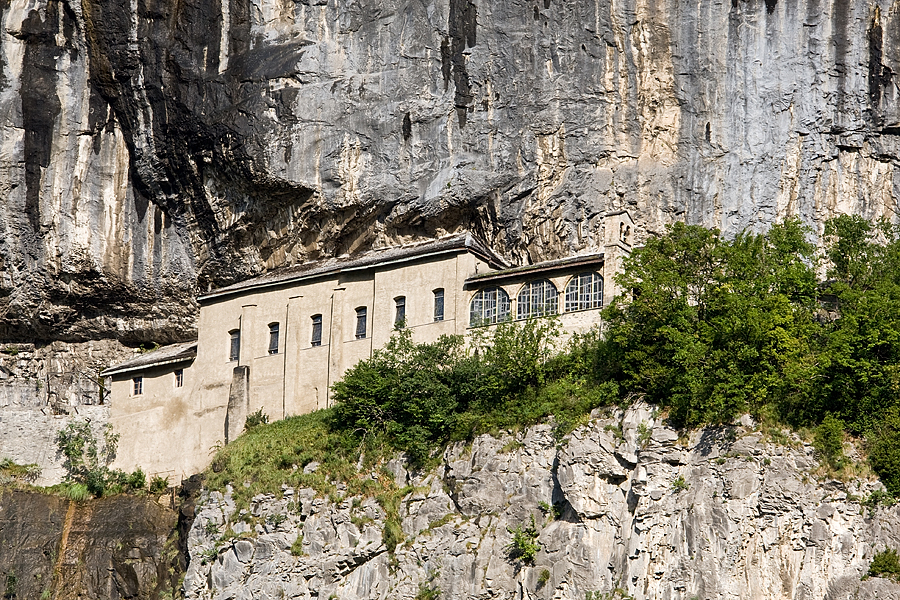
The chapel of Notre-Dame-du-Scex was built in the 18th century on the remains of an 8th-century building

Saint-Maurice is first mentioned in 200 as Acaun[ensis] [quadragesimae] Gal[liarum]. In respect to Saint Maurice, the name was changed from Acaunum (French: Agaune) to Saint-Maurice in 1003.

Some traces of a Bronze Age settlement were found at the foot of the rocky spur in town. There was a Roman era town at Saint-Maurice, but very little is known about the actual layout of it. There was a customs post at Acaunum, where an import and export tariff of 2.5% was levied. The town probably had a shrine to water nymphs. According to tradition, Saint Maurice and his southern Egyptian companions of the Theban Legion were martyred in Acaunum during the reign of Maximian (286-310). Around 360-370 Theodul, the first Bishop of Valais, built a basilica in Acaunum in their honor. The basilica became a popular pilgrimage site. In 515, the King of Burgundy Sigismund founded the Abbey, which he endowed with rich land.

In 523, the town was invaded by the Franks, followed in 574 by the Lombards and in the mid-10th century, by the Saracens. In 888 Rudolf of Welf was crowned King of Burgundy in the Abbey. In 1034, the entire Chablais region, which included Saint-Maurice, was acquired by the Duchy of Savoy. The towns of Saint-Maurice and Monthey formed a Kastlanei or district. Around 1300, the Kastlan or vogt moved from Monthey to Saint-Maurice. The abbot exercised dominion over the abbey and the town. Citizens of the town were first mentioned in 1170 and by 1275, the citizens elected two mayors.

In 1246 Amadeus IV, Count of Savoy enfeoffed Saint-Maurice to King Henry III of England in return for a pension along with the castles at Bard, Avigliana and Susa.

In the 13th century the town was surrounded by walls. Count Amadeus V of Savoy confirmed the city charter in 1317, at which time the town had a population of between 1,400 and 1,800. In 1475 the Lower Valais was ruled by the Seven Zenden as an associate member (Zugewandter Ort) of the Swiss Confederation. From 1475 until 1798, Saint-Maurice was the capital of the Saint-Maurice province.

In the following year, 1476, Bern began construction of a castle in the narrow Rhone valley at Saint-Maurice. It was completed in 1646 with the expansion of the residential buildings. However, in 1693 a devastating fire in the town, destroyed the warehouse of the castle and much of the gunpowder that was stored there.

During the Helvetic Republic Saint-Maurice was a District capital. After the Act of Mediation ended the Republic, from 1802 to 1804 it was a Zenden capital and in 1810-14 it was the capital of a sub-prefecture of the French department of the Simplon. In 1822 the towns of Vérossaz and Evionnaz separated from the municipality.

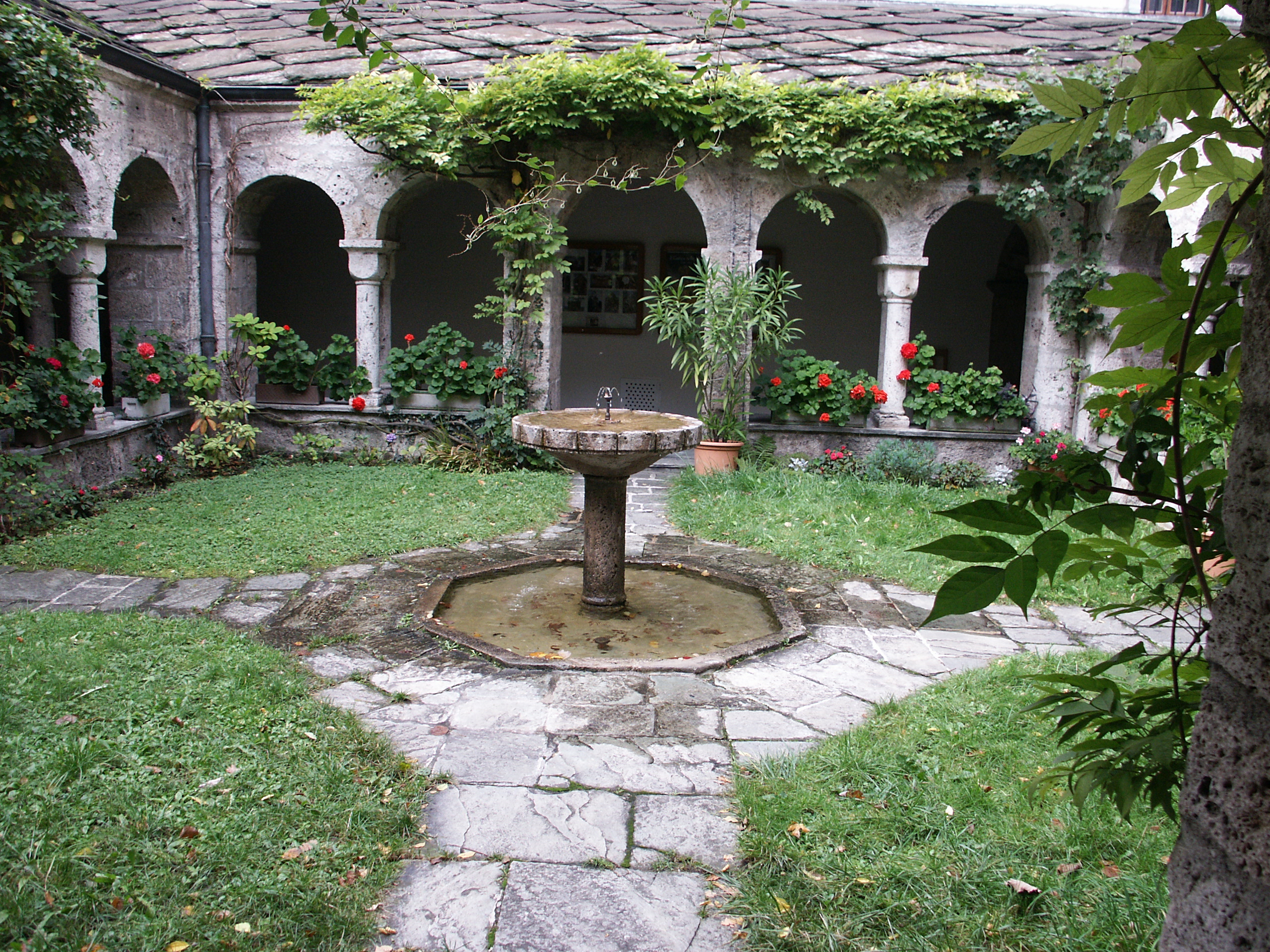
Cloister of Saint-Maurice Abbey

The most important religious institution in town was the abbey, but several other religious communities were established in Saint-Maurice. These communities included; in 1611 the Capuchins, in 1865 the Sisters of Saint-Maurice, in 1906 the Augustinian Sisters and in 1996 the Brotherhood of the Eucharist in Epinassey. The Capuchin monastery's chapel was built in 1640. The church of Saint-Sigismond has been the parish church since at least the mid-12th century. It was built on the site of the 6th- or 7th-century St. John's burial church. The present church building dates of 1715. The still standing Hospice of Saint-Jacques was built in the 10th century. Until the Reformation in 1529, Morcles belonged to the parish of Saint-Maurice and the church of Notre Dame-sous-le-Bourg was the parish church for Lavey. In 1693 Notre Dame-sous-le-Bourg was destroyed in a fire and by 1721 only the ruins of the walls still remained. The chapel of Saint-Laurent was first mentioned in 1178 and was abandoned in the 19th century. The church of Notre-Dame-du-Scex was built in the 18th century, on the remains of an 8th-century building. The Martyrs Chapel in Vérolliez was rebuilt to its present appearance in the 18th century. The chapel in Epinassey was established in 1923. The Abbey College, was first mentioned in the Middle Ages. In 1806, support of the school was taken over by the canton and it became the Collège de Saint-Maurice.

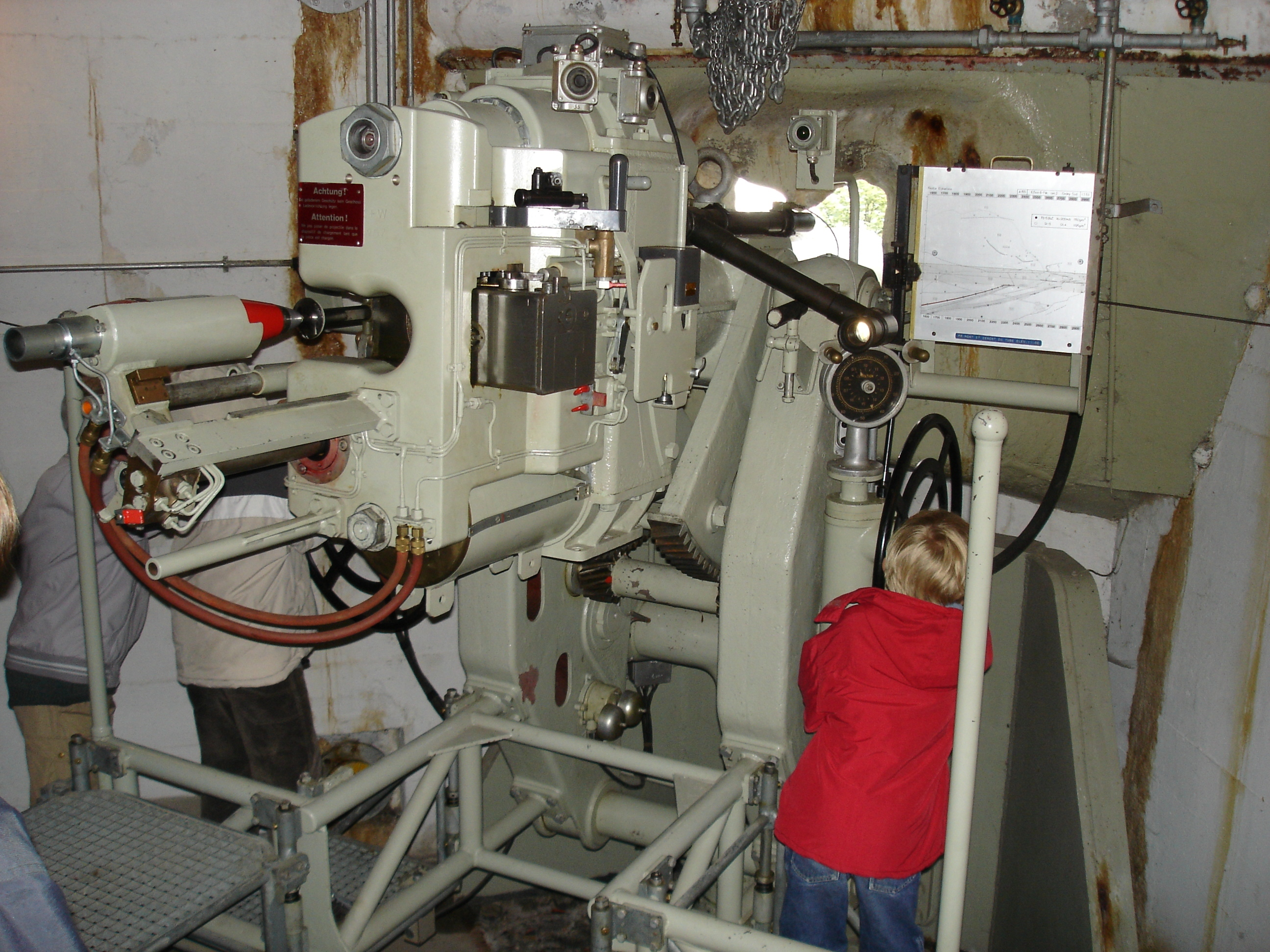
105 mm (4 in) cannon at the Cindey fort in Saint-Maurice

The narrow canyon at Saint-Maurice facilitated both trade and defense. The bridge over the Rhone was built around the 12th century and was the first bridge upstream of Lake Geneva after the Roman bridge of Massongex (2 km downstream Saint-Maurice). The fortifications in the canyon was gradually expanded in 1831, 1848, 1859 and finally in 1892. During the Second World War, the fortifications at Saint-Maurice were one of the three main pillars of the National Redoubt. In 1995, the fortifications were abandoned and opened as a tourist attraction. Following the army reforms of Armee 95 and XXI, the former mountain infantry military base of Saint-Maurice-Lavey has served as a training camp for the military police.

A large rail yard was built in the municipality following the construction of a railway in 1860, now part of the Simplon Railway. Between 1898 and 1940, the power plant Bois Noir, supplied the city of Lausanne with electricity. However, the municipality was not industrialized until much later. The first major industrial plant was a cement factory that was in operation from the 1950s until 1986. In 1934 the Saint-Augustin printing house opened in town. The newspaper "valaisan Nouvelliste" (New Valais) was founded in 1903 in Saint-Maurice. It was renamed the "Feuille d'Avis Nouvelliste et du Valais" in 1968. The "Echos de Saint-Maurice" was first published in 1899, and in 2000 became the "Nouvelles de l'Abbaye". The "La Patrie Valaisanne" was published between 1927 and 1969. It then became the CVP party newspaper under the title "Valais Demain" until it closed in 1997.

Aerial view (1971)

The abbey building, its treasure, and the Feengrotte which opened in 1863, attract pilgrims and tourists. The Saint-Amé clinic was founded in 1901 and was rebuilt in 1996 into the Lower Valais geriatrics center. The city is home to a branch of the Mediathek Wallis (the library of Wallis), which was formerly the Lower Valais branch of the Cantonal Library. The Educators' School of Wallis (Pädagogic Hochschule Wallis) is located in the municipality. The new zoning plan of 1996 provides for the development of Saint-Maurice at the exit of the A9 motorway.

In 2008, the eleven-member town council had six members of the CVP, four FDP.The Liberals and one representative of the Alliance de gauche. The thirty-member General Council had 15 members from the CVP, 11 from the FDP. The Liberals and four from the Alliance de gauche. The citizen's council is managed by a six-member committee, which oversee extensive property, including the campsite Bois Noir, pastures and forests.

== Geography ==
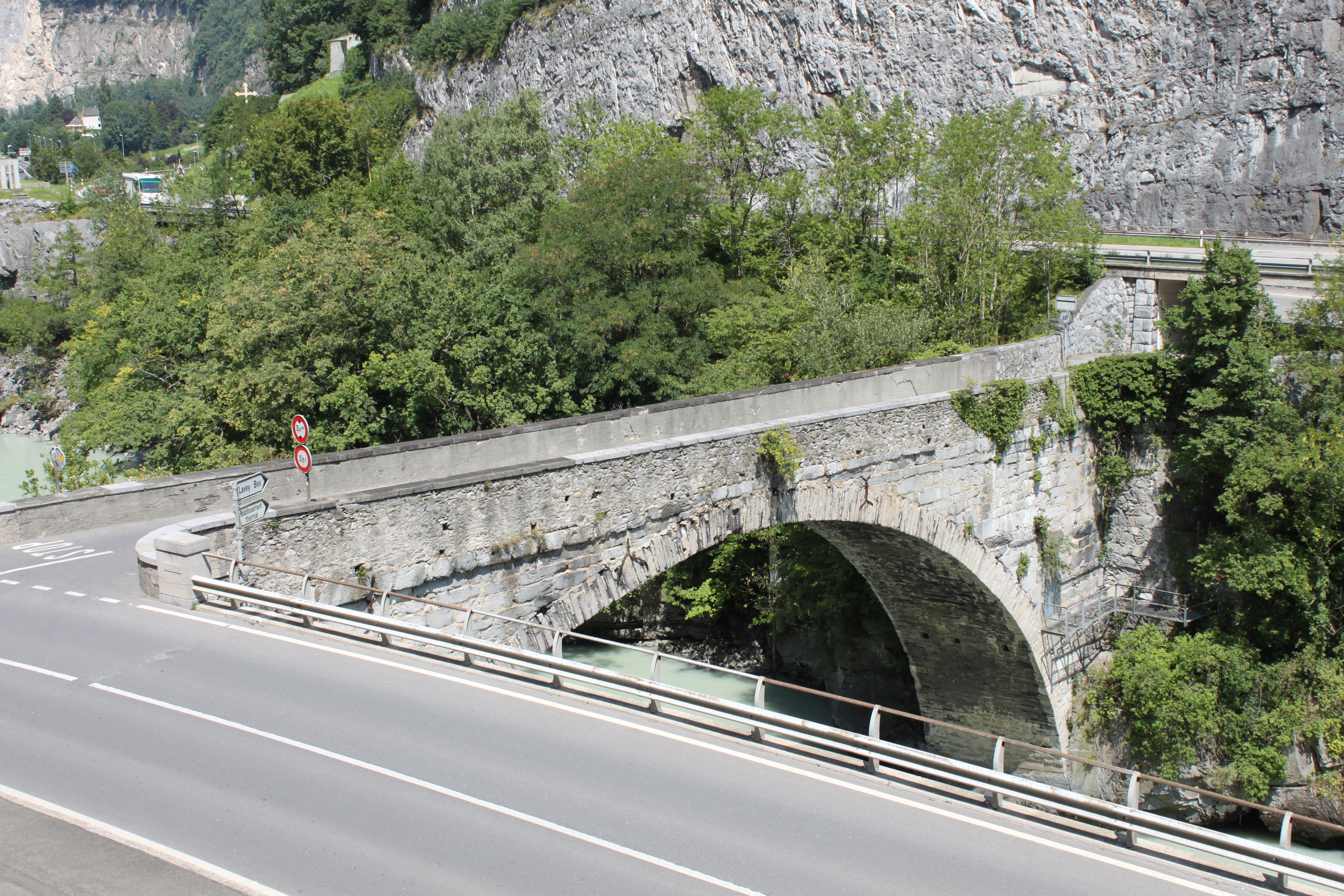
Bridge over the Rhône river at Saint-Maurice

Saint-Maurice has an area, as of 2009, of 7 square kilometers (2.7 mi^{2}). Of this area, 1.51 km^{2} (0.58 mi^{2}) or 21.5% is used for agricultural purposes, while 2.95 km^{2} (1.14 mi^{2}) or 42.0% is forested. Of the rest of the land, 2.28 km^{2} (0.88 mi^{2}) or 32.5% is settled (buildings or roads), 0.2 km^{2} (0.077 mi^{2}) or 2.8% is either rivers or lakes and 0.1 km^{2} (25 acres) or 1.4% is unproductive land.

Of the built up area, industrial buildings made up 3.3% of the total area while housing and buildings made up 11.5% and transportation infrastructure made up 13.0%. Power and water infrastructure as well as other special developed areas made up 2.4% of the area while parks, green belts and sports fields made up 2.3%. Out of the forested land, 38.5% of the total land area is heavily forested and 3.6% is covered with orchards or small clusters of trees. Of the agricultural land, 8.1% is used for growing crops and 10.5% is pastures, while 2.8% is used for orchards or vine crops. All the water in the municipality is flowing water. Of the unproductive areas, 1.1% is too rocky for vegetation.

The city of Saint-Maurice is located at the foot of a rock wall and at a narrow point in the Rhône valley, on the left side of the Rhône river. The city sits on the routes over the Valais alpine passes into Italy. It consists of the town of Saint-Maurice and the hamlets of Épinassey and Les Cases. Until 1822, it included the villages of Evionnaz and Vérossaz.

The municipalities of Mex and Saint-Maurice have merged on 1 January 2013.

== Coat of arms ==
The blazon of the municipal coat of arms is Per pale Azure and Gules, overall a Cross Bottony Argent.

== Demographics ==
Saint-Maurice has a population (as of December 2020) of 4,518. As of 2008, 26.0% of the population are resident foreign nationals. Over the last 10 years (2000–2010) the population has changed at a rate of 14.5%. It has changed at a rate of 13.5% due to migration and at a rate of 1.6% due to births and deaths.

Most of the population (as of 2000) speaks French (3,097 or 86.1%) as their first language, Italian is the second most common (123 or 3.4%) and Albanian is the third (112 or 3.1%). There are 87 people who speak German.

As of 2008, the population was 48.7% male and 51.3% female. The population was made up of 1,421 Swiss men (34.5% of the population) and 584 (14.2%) non-Swiss men. There were 1,582 Swiss women (38.5%) and 527 (12.8%) non-Swiss women. Of the population in the municipality, 1,146 or about 31.9% were born in Saint-Maurice and lived there in 2000. There were 921 or 25.6% who were born in the same canton, while 690 or 19.2% were born somewhere else in Switzerland, and 722 or 20.1% were born outside of Switzerland.

As of 2000, children and teenagers (0–19 years old) make up 24.4% of the population, while adults (20–64 years old) make up 57.8% and seniors (over 64 years old) make up 17.8%.

As of 2000, there were 1,559 people who were single and never married in the municipality. There were 1,592 married individuals, 231 widows or widowers and 214 individuals who are divorced.

As of 2000, there were 1,376 private households in the municipality, and an average of 2.4 persons per household. There were 438 households that consist of only one person and 117 households with five or more people. In 2000, a total of 1,319 apartments (85.9% of the total) were permanently occupied, while 153 apartments (10.0%) were seasonally occupied and 64 apartments (4.2%) were empty. As of 2009, the construction rate of new housing units was 3.2 new units per 1000 residents. The vacancy rate for the municipality, in 2010, was 2.95%.

The historical population is given in the following chart:

== Heritage sites of national significance ==
Abbey of St. Maurice, Agaunum, Saint-Maurice Castle with the Cantonal Military Museum, Maison de la Pierre and the Bridge over the Rhône (shared with Bex, Vaud) are listed as Swiss heritage site of national significance. The entire Saint-Maurice castle and city area are part of the Inventory of Swiss Heritage Sites.

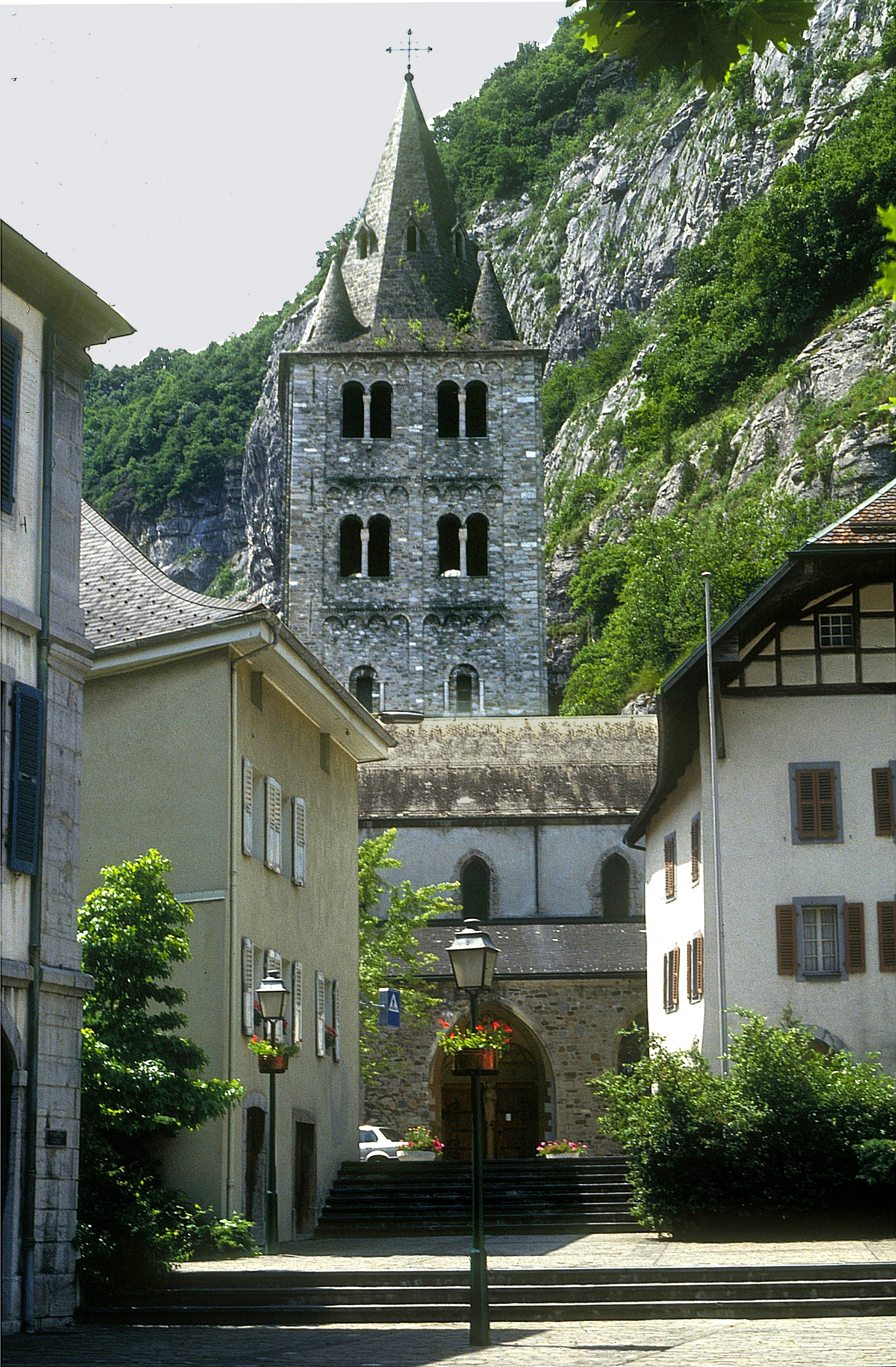
St-Maurice D’Agaune Abbey

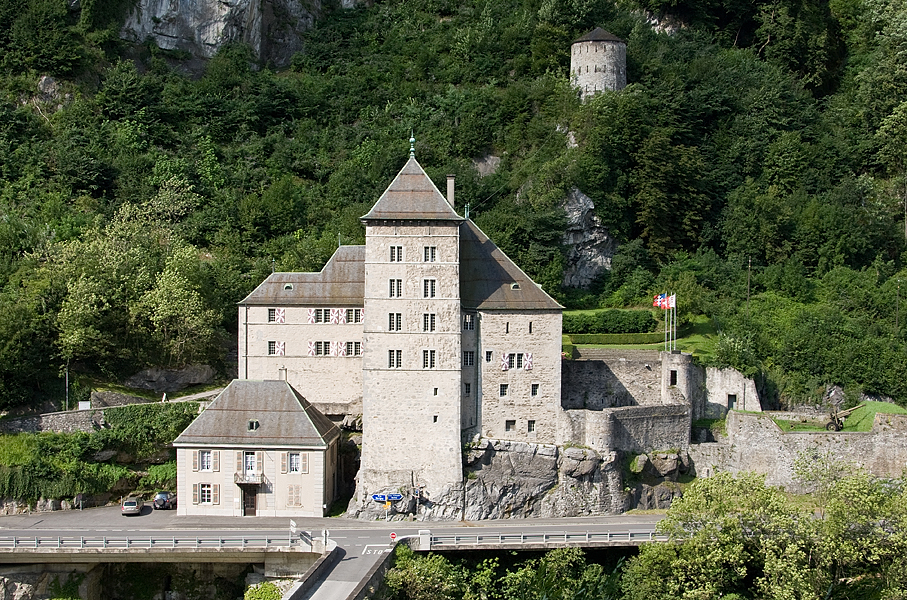
Saint-Maurice Castle

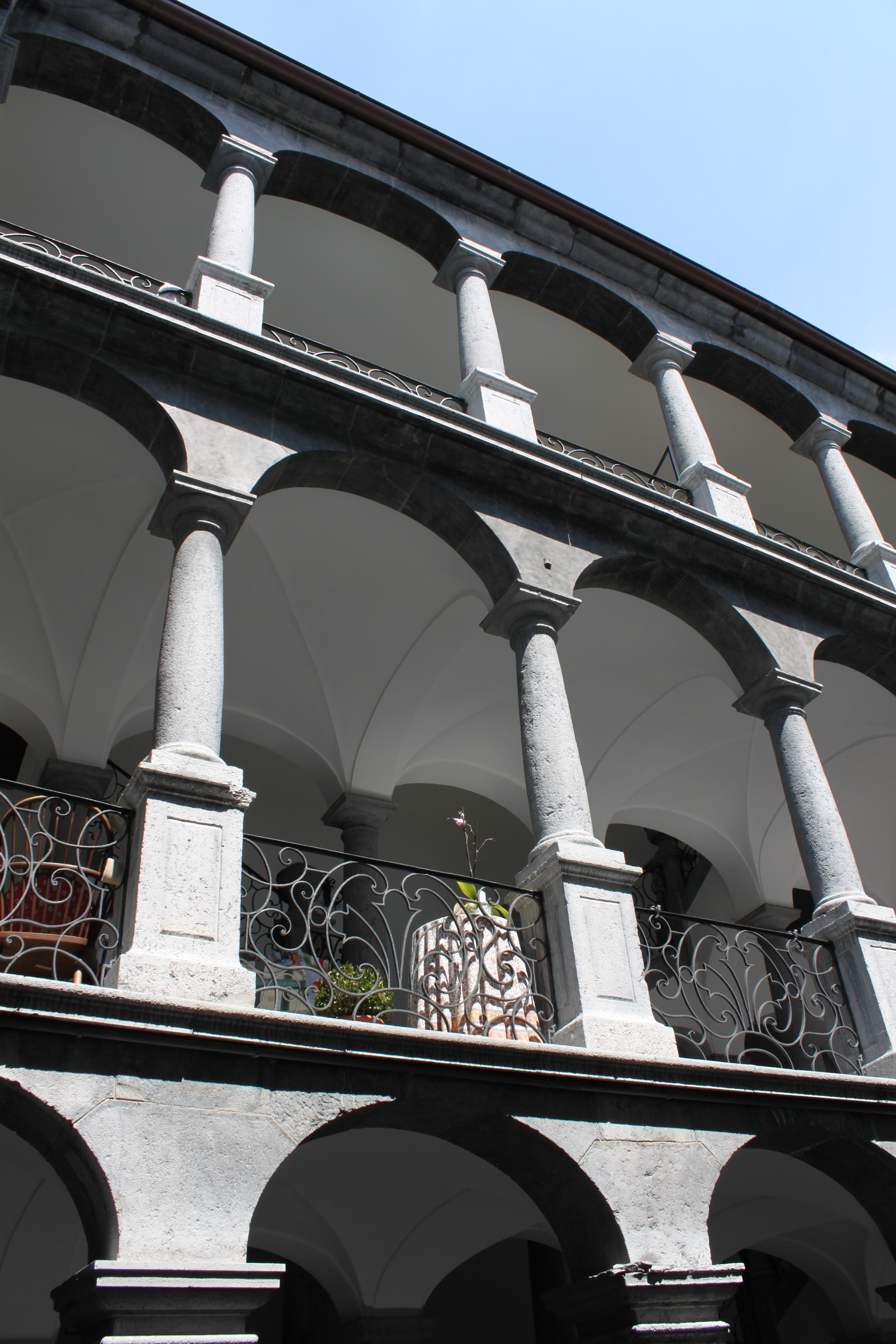
Columns in the Maison de la Pierre

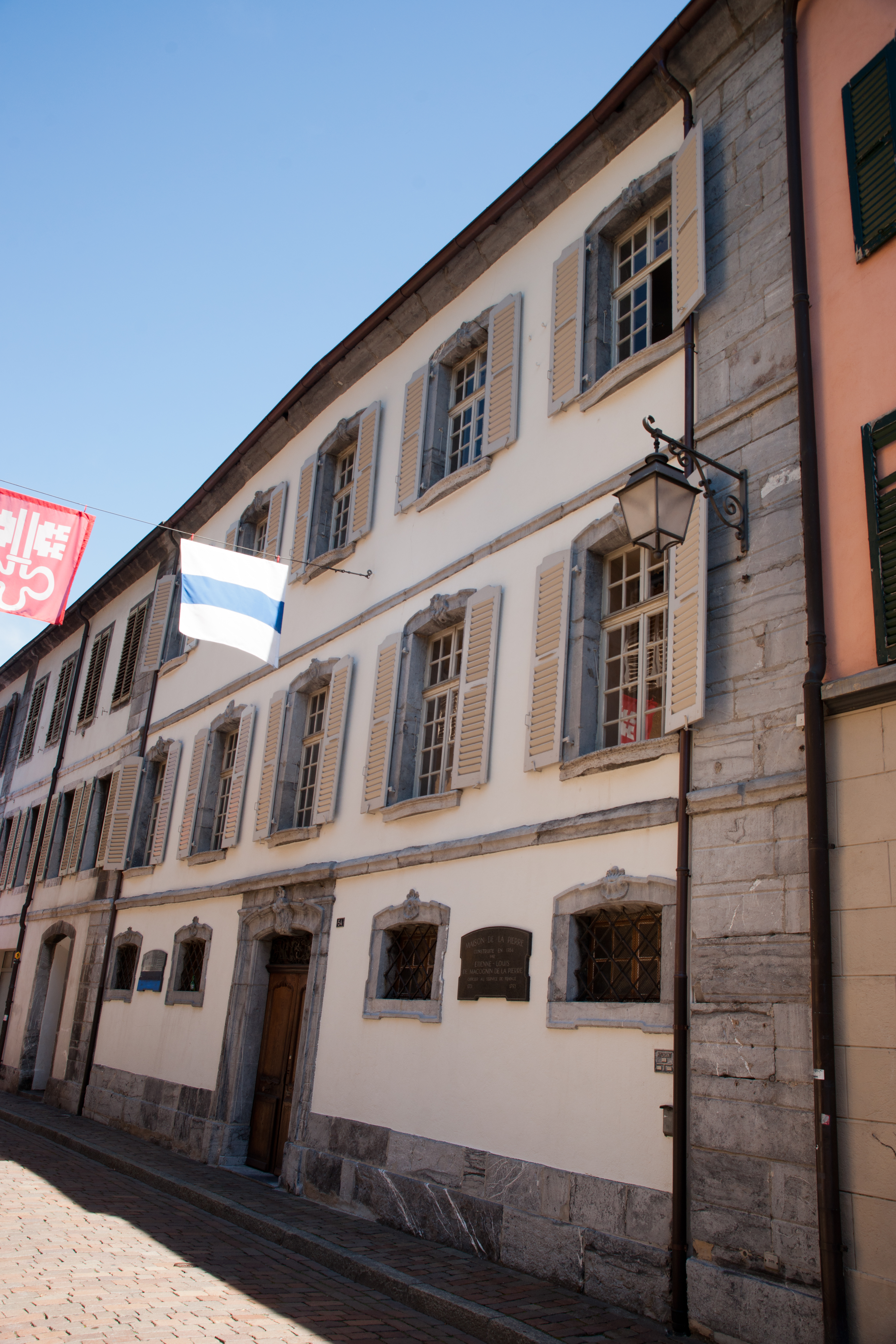
Front of the Maison de la Pierre

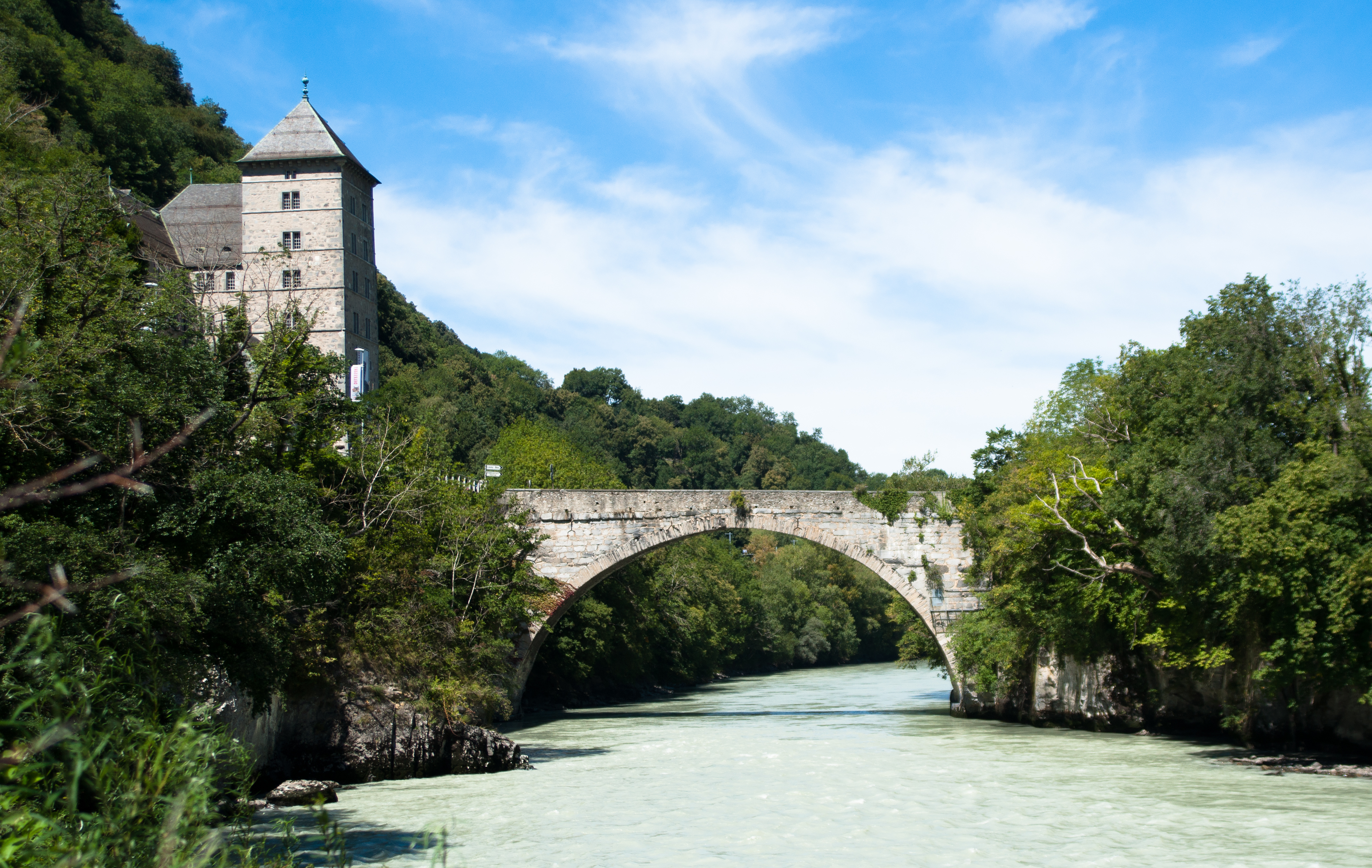
Bridge over the Rhône

== Politics ==
In the 2007 federal election the most popular party was the CVP which received 40.24% of the vote. The next three most popular parties were the FDP (19.88%), the SP (17.36%) and the SVP (13.6%). In the federal election, a total of 1,429 votes were cast, and the voter turnout was 60.3%.

== Economy ==
As of 2010, Saint-Maurice had an unemployment rate of 6.5%. As of 2008, there were 16 people employed in the primary economic sector and about 9 businesses involved in this sector. 257 people were employed in the secondary sector and there were 39 businesses in this sector. 1,522 people were employed in the tertiary sector, with 151 businesses in this sector. There were 1,609 residents of the municipality who were employed in some capacity, of which females made up 43.5% of the workforce.

In 2008 the total number of full-time equivalent jobs was 1,391. The number of jobs in the primary sector was 10, all of which were in agriculture. The number of jobs in the secondary sector was 238 of which 68 or (28.6%) were in manufacturing and 166 (69.7%) were in construction. The number of jobs in the tertiary sector was 1,143. In the tertiary sector; 143 or 12.5% were in wholesale or retail sales or the repair of motor vehicles, 150 or 13.1% were in the movement and storage of goods, 94 or 8.2% were in a hotel or restaurant, 17 or 1.5% were in the information industry, 6 or 0.5% were the insurance or financial industry, 27 or 2.4% were technical professionals or scientists, 252 or 22.0% were in education and 251 or 22.0% were in health care.

In 2000, there were 1,031 workers who commuted into the municipality and 824 workers who commuted away. The municipality is a net importer of workers, with about 1.3 workers entering the municipality for every one leaving. Of the working population, 10.3% used public transportation to get to work, and 59.9% used a private car.

== Religion ==
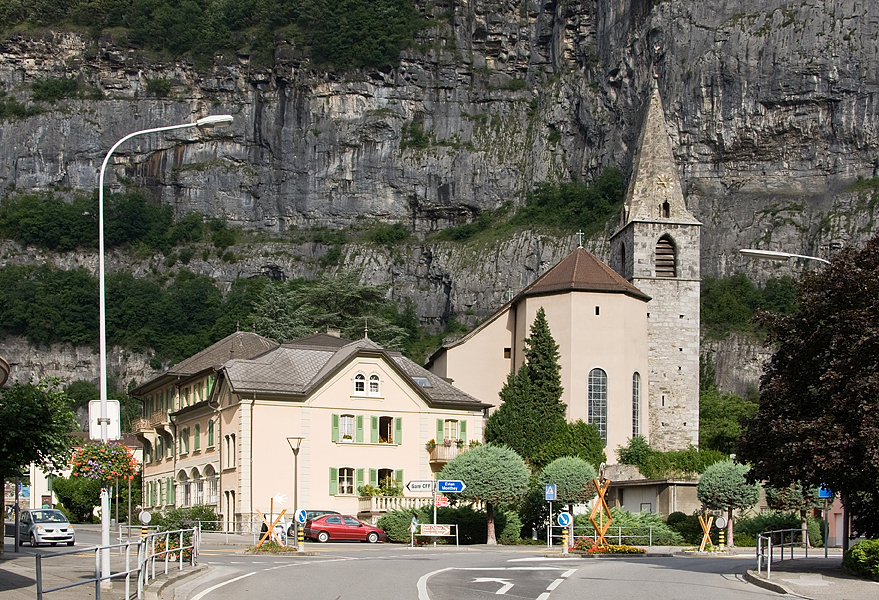
Church in Saint-Maurice

From the 2000 census, 2,720 or 75.6% were Roman Catholic, while 285 or 7.9% belonged to the Swiss Reformed Church. Of the rest of the population, there were 26 members of an Orthodox church (or about 0.72% of the population), there were 2 individuals (or about 0.06% of the population) who belonged to the Christian Catholic Church, and there were 32 individuals (or about 0.89% of the population) who belonged to another Christian church. There was 1 individual who was Jewish, and 250 (or about 6.95% of the population) who were Islamic. There were 2 individuals who were Buddhist and 5 individuals who belonged to another church. 125 (or about 3.48% of the population) belonged to no church, are agnostic or atheist, and 163 individuals (or about 4.53% of the population) did not answer the question.

== Education ==
In Saint-Maurice about 1,126 or (31.3%) of the population have completed non-mandatory upper secondary education, and 300 or (8.3%) have completed additional higher education (either university or a Fachhochschule). Of the 300 who completed tertiary schooling, 59.3% were Swiss men, 31.7% were Swiss women, 5.3% were non-Swiss men and 3.7% were non-Swiss women.

As of 2000, there were 1,273 students in Saint-Maurice who came from another municipality, while 115 residents attended schools outside the municipality.

Saint-Maurice is home to the Médiathèque Valais - Saint-Maurice library. The library has (as of 2008) 70,829 books or other media, and loaned out 81,732 items in the same year. It was open a total of 249 days with average of 34.5 hours per week during that year.

== Transportation ==
The municipality has a railway station, St-Maurice, on the Saint-Gingolph–Saint-Maurice and Simplon lines. It has regular service to Annemasse, Lausanne, Geneva Airport, and Brig.

== Notable people ==
- Jean-François Fournier (born 1966 in Saint-Maurice) a writer, playwright, poet and biographer
