= Fournier =

Fournier is a French surname describing the occupation of a baker who tends the fire of an oven or furnace, and is derived from the Latin furnarius.

Notable people with the surname include:

- Alain Fournier, computer graphics researcher
- Alain Fournier, Canadian animator
- Alain-Fournier (Henri-Alban Fournier), French writer
- Alphonse Fournier (1893–1961), Canadian politician
- Amédée Fournier, French bicycle racer
- Ángel Fournier, Cuban rower (1987–2023)
- Catherine Fournier (Canadian politician) (born 1992), Canadian politician
- Charles Fournier (born 1968), French politician
- Christophe Fournier, president of the Médecins Sans Frontières organisation
- Claude Fournier (1745–1825), a personality of the French Revolution, nicknamed l'Americain
- Claude Fournier (1931–2023), filmmaker
- Colin Fournier, professor of The Bartlett School of Architecture
- Edgar Fournier, Canadian politician
- Eduardo Fournier, Chilean football player
- Eugène Pierre Nicolas Fournier, French botanist
- Evan Fournier (born 1992), French basketball player in the National Basketball Association
- Francine Fournier, professional wrestling manager/valet
- François Fournier (disambiguation), multiple people
- Georges Fournier, French astronomer
- Ghislain Fournier, Canadian politician
- Guy Fournier (born 1931), author, playwright, and screenwriter
- Heraclio Alfaro Fournier (1893–1962), Spanish-born aviator
- Hubert Fournier (born 1967), French retired footballer
- Jack Fournier (1889–1973), first baseman in Major League Baseball
- Jack Fournier (1892–1966), Canadian ice hockey player
- Jacques Fournier (1285–1342), Bishop of Pamiers, who became Pope Benedict XII
- Jean Alfred Fournier (1832–1914), French dermatologist
- Jean-Claude Fournier, French comics artist
- Jean-Marc Fournier (born 1959), politician and a lawyer
- Joe Fournier (born 1983), British businessman and professional boxer
- Joseph Fournier de Belleval (1892–1945), French Canadian baritone
- Joseph Michel Fournier (1905–1992), Canadian politician
- Laurent Fournier (born 1964), football manager and former midfielder
- Marcel Fournier (actor), actor from Quebec
- Marcel Fournier (sociologist) (born 1945), sociologist from Quebec
- Michel Fournier (born 1944), French parachutist and adventurer
- Michel Fournier (1945–2008), French cinematographer
- Michelle Fournier (born 1977), Canadian hammer thrower
- Naipes Heraclio Fournier, founder of Spanish playing card manufacturer Naipes Heraclio Fournier S.A.
- Narcisse Fournier (1809–1880), French journalist
- Pierre Fournier (1906–1986), French cellist
- Pierre Fournier (1949–2022), Canadian French-language comics creator
- Pierre Fournier (born 1952), French comics artist who works under the pseudonym Makyo
- Pierre Charles Fournier de Saint-Amant, French chess player
- Pierre Simon Fournier (1712–1768), French typographer
- Rafael Ángel Calderón Fournier (born 1949), President of Costa Rica from 1990 to 1994
- Rémi Fournier, French football player
- René Fournier, French professional racing cyclist
- René Fournier, French aircraft designer, known for Fournier RF 4
- Rift Fournier (1936–2013), American writer, screenwriter and television producer
- Robert Fournier-Sarlovèze, French politician and polo player
- Ron Fournier, American journalist
- Ron Fournier (radio personality) (born 1949), Canadian sports analyst
- Ryan Fournier (born 1995), American political commentator
- Sarto Fournier (1908–1980), Canadian politician
- Sébastien Fournier (born 1971), Swiss football player
- Stephen Fournier (1852–1919), Canadian politician
- Télesphore Fournier (1823–1896), Canadian politician and jurist
- Toby Fournier (born 2005), Canadian basketball player
- Vernel Fournier, jazz drummer
- William G. Fournier, Medal of Honor recipient
