= Limbach L1700 =

German aircraft engine

- Type: Aircraft engine
- National origin: German
- Manufacturer: Limbach Flugmotoren
- Major applications: Fournier RF 5 Schleicher ASK 16; SZD-45 Ogar
- Manufactured: 1971-present

The Limbach L1700 is a series of type certified German aircraft engines, designed and produced by Limbach Flugmotoren of Königswinter for use in light aircraft and motorgliders.

The series were originally designated as the SL1700 under its former certification and was changed to L1700 by company Service Bulletin no. 17.

== Design and development ==
The L1700 is a four-cylinder four-stroke, horizontally-opposed air-cooled, petrol direct-dive engine design, based upon the Volkswagen air-cooled engine. It employs a single magneto ignition, one carburettor, is lubricated by a wet sump and produces 50 kW (67 hp) at 3600 rpm.

The L1700 was type certified by the European Aviation Safety Agency on 4 August 2006. The first engines in the series had originally been certified by the German Luftfahrt-Bundesamt (LBA) on 6 December 1971.

== Variants ==
L1700 EA
Version that puts out 44 kW (59 hp) for takeoff and 41 kW (55 hp) continuously.
L 1700 EB
Version that puts out 53 kW (71 hp) for takeoff and 48 kW (64 hp) continuously.
L1700 EO/EC
Version that puts out 50 kW (67 hp) for takeoff and 44 kW (59 hp) continuously.
L 1700 ED
Version that puts out 41 kW (55 hp) for takeoff and 39 kW (52 hp) continuously.

== Applications ==
- Airconcept VoWi 10
- Akaflieg Darmstadt D-39
- Blessing Rebell
- Coupé-Aviation JC-01
- Fournier RF 5
- Fournier RF7
- ICA IS-28
- Kortenbach & Rauh Kora 1
- Pober Pixie
- Scheibe Falke
- Scheibe Tandem-Falke
- Schleicher ASK 16
- Slingsby Falke
- SZD-45 Ogar

== Specifications (L1700 EO/EC) ==
Data from World Directory of Leisure Aviation 2011-12

=== General characteristics ===
- Type: Four-cylinder, four stroke aircraft engine
- Bore: 88 mm (3.5 in)
- Stroke: 69 mm (2.7 in)
- Displacement: 1,680 cc (102.5 cu in)
- Length: 617 mm (24.3 in)
- Width: 770 mm (30.3 in)
- Height: 415 mm (16.3 in)
- Dry weight: 73 kg (160.9 lb)

=== Components ===
- Fuel type: 98 RON octane unleaded petrol or 100 LL Avgas
- Cooling system: air

=== Performance ===
- Power output: 50 kW (67 hp) for takeoff, 44 kW (59 hp) continuously
- Compression ratio: 8.0:1

== See also ==
Related lists

- List of aircraft engines
