= RF-5 =

RF-5 may refer to one of the following:

- Reconnaissance modifications of F-5 Freedom Fighter (RF-5A, RF-5E, RF-5S)
- Rot-Front-5, a 1934 Rot Front glider by Oleg Antonov
- The two-seater motor glider Fournier RF 5
