= RF-5B =

The term RF-5B may refer to:

- Fournier RF 5, a French motorglider design
- Northrop F-5, the reconnaissance version of the American fighter aircraft design
