= François Fournier =

François Fournier may refer to:

- François Fournier (Lower Canada politician) (1776–1836), land surveyor and politician in Lower Canada
- François Fournier (French politician) (1866–1941), French politician from Manduel, Gard
- François Fournier (stamp forger) (1846–1917), Swiss-born stamp forger
- François Fournier-Sarlovèze (1773–1827), French general of the Napoleonic Wars
- François Joseph Fournier (1857–1935), Belgian adventurer
- Jean-François Fournier (born 1966), writer, poet and biographer from Saint-Maurice
