= D39 =

D39 may refer to:

- Akaflieg Darmstadt D-39, a German motor glider
- D39 road (Croatia)
- HMAS Hobart (D 39), a Perth-class destroyer of the Royal Australian Navy
- HMS Amazon (D39), a prototype destroyer of the Royal Navy
- Queen's Gambit Declined, a chess opening
- Wilmette Public Schools District 39
- D39, an Egyptian hieroglyph
- PRR D39, a Pennsylvania Railroad 4-4-0 steam locomotive
