= Morcles =

Coordinates: 46°13′N 7°02′E

View of the village from the west.

Morcles is a village and former municipality in the district of Aigle in the canton of Vaud, Switzerland.

It was first recorded in year 1043 as Morcles.

The municipality had 66 inhabitants in 1764, which increased to 84 in 1803 but went back down to 68 in 1850.

In 1852 the municipality was merged with the neighboring municipality Lavey to form a new and larger municipality Lavey-Morcles.
