= SZD-45 Ogar =

Polish two-seat motor-glider, 1973

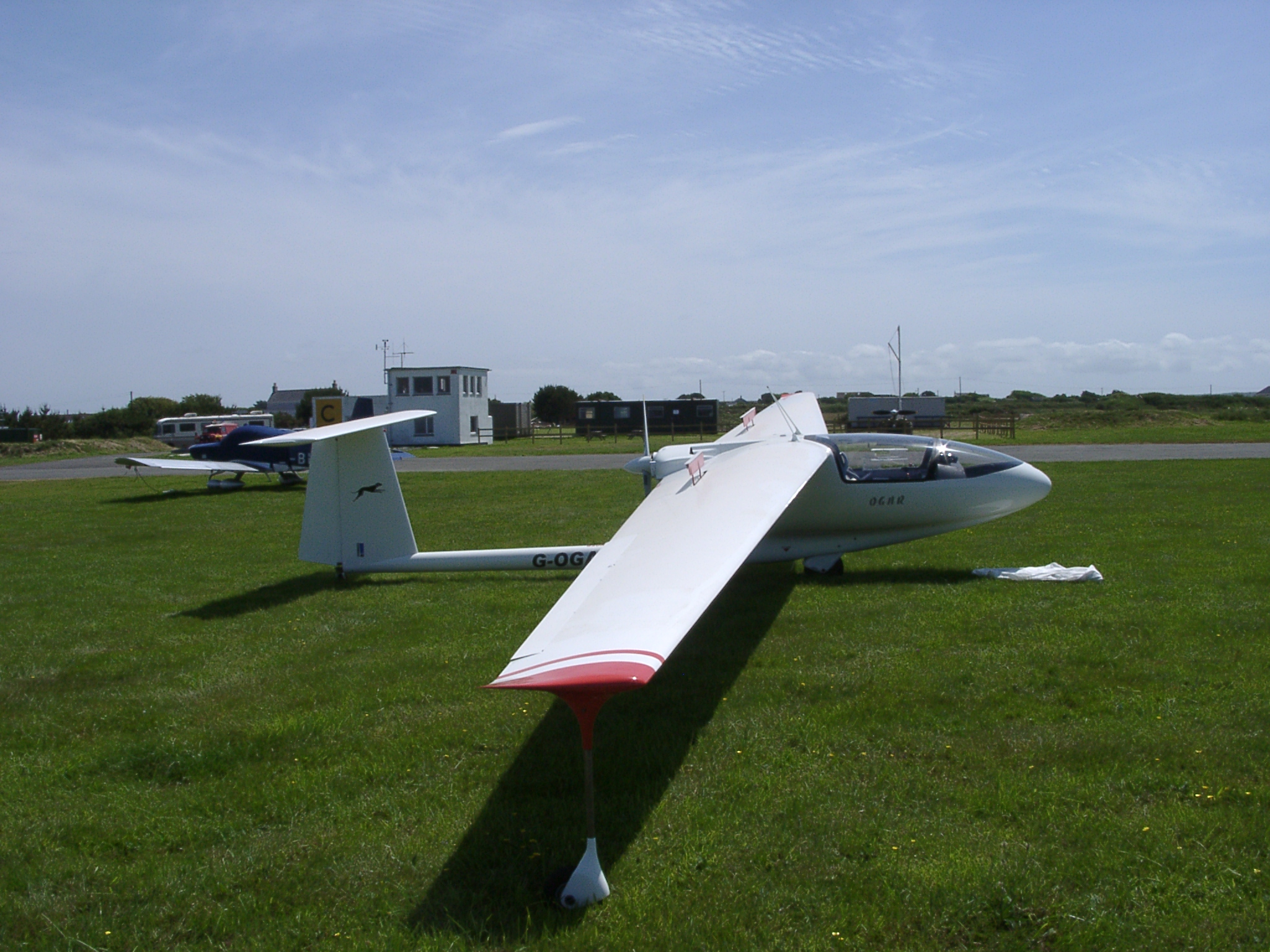

General information
- Type: 2-seat Motorglider
- National origin: Poland
- Manufacturer: SZD (Szybowcowy Zakład Doświadczalny)
- Designer: Tadeusz Labuc
- Number built: 66

History
- First flight: 29 May 1973

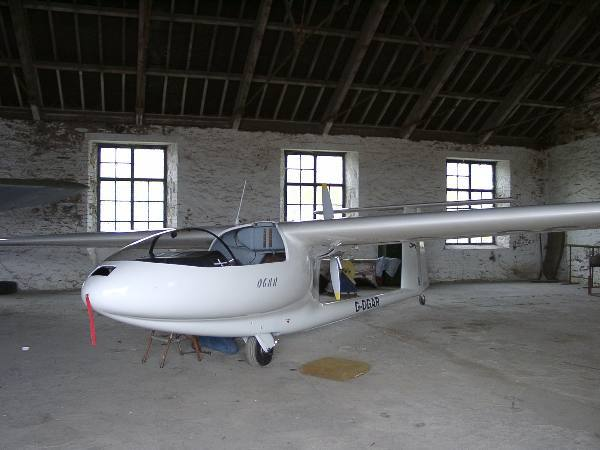

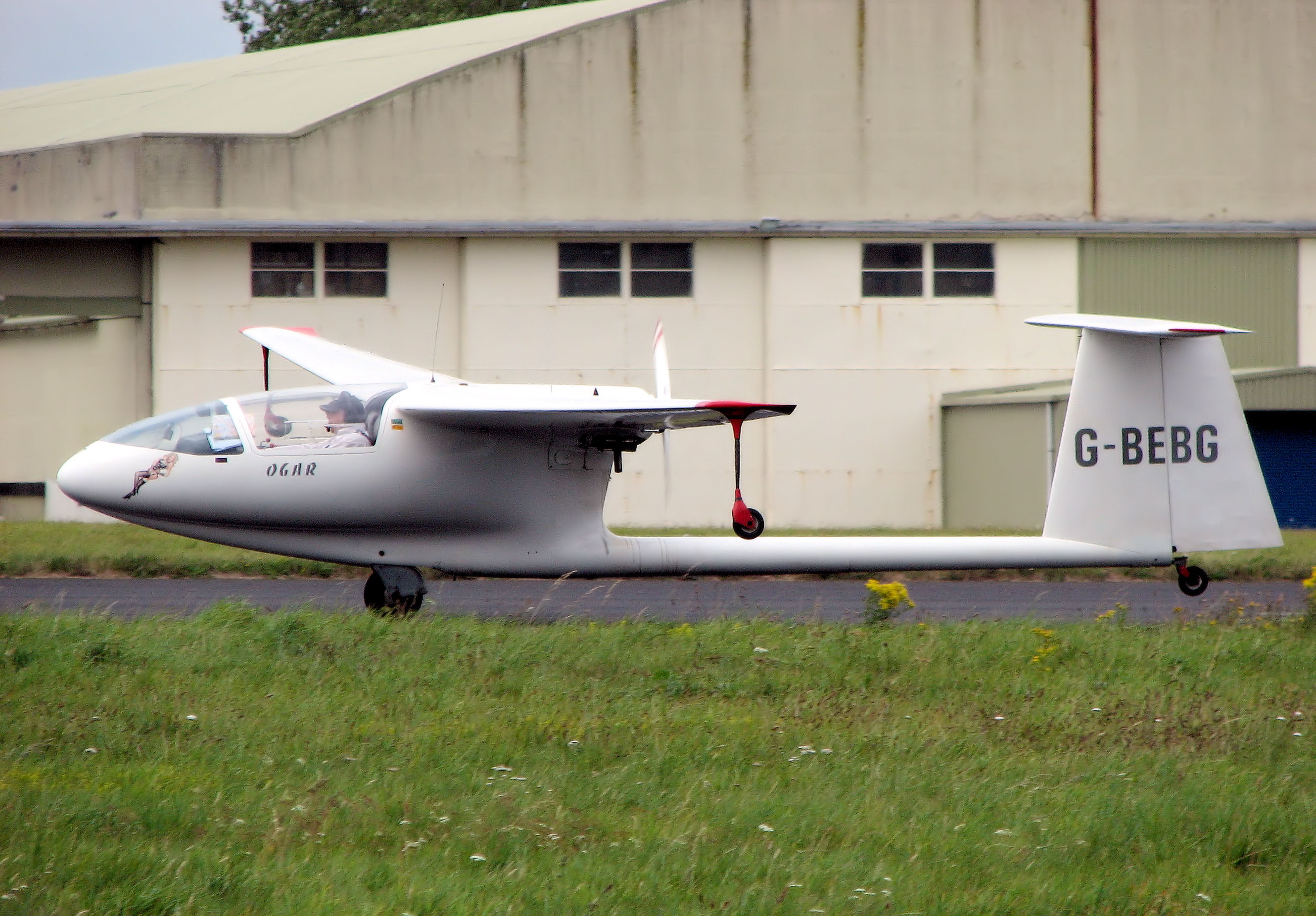

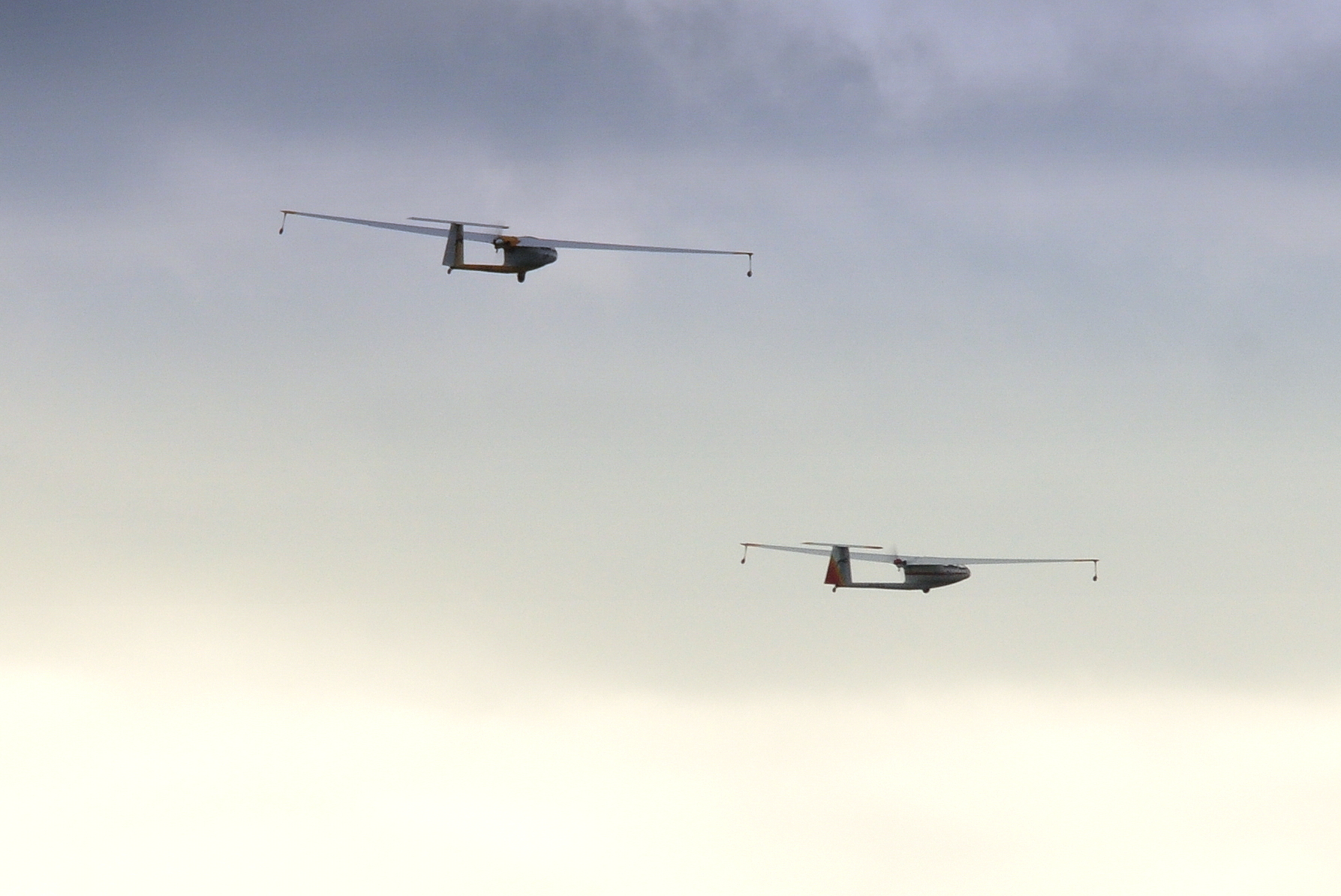

The SZD-45 Ogar (Hound) is a T-tailed cantilever high-wing monoplane of wooden, aluminium and fibreglass construction designed and manufactured in Poland.

== Design and development ==
Designed bu Dipl.-Ing. Tadeusz Labuc, the 2-seat Ogar is intended for training glider pilots from ab-initio to advanced stages as well as cross-country flying. The first prototype,(reg. no. SP-0001), first flew on 29 May 1973 powered by a 34 kW (45 hp) Stark-Stamo engine. Due to the Stamo engine being unavailable, production SZD-45A Ogars were built with 51 kW (68 hp) Limbach SL1700EC engines and later with Franklin 2A-120 engines as the SZD-45-2 Ogar F.

Of pod and boom layout the Ogar has a T-tail on a tubular Aluminium alloy tubular boom extending from the keel of the fuselage pod, which houses the cockpit and engine. A variety of materials are used in construction, with a glass-fibre cockpit shell over two load-bearing wooden frames. The wings are of wooden single-spar construction skinned with plywood and covered with glass-fibre. The engine is mounted at the rear of the fuselage pod, aft of the wing trailing edge at the same level and driving a pusher propeller. The undercarriage consists of a semi-retractable mainwheel fitted with a disc brake, steerable tailwheel and optional outrigger wheels on flexible struts at the wing-tips. Accommodation for two pilots is provided side by side under an aft-hinged upward-opening canopy. The Ogar was certified for simple aerobatics.

Of the 66 production aircraft, 41 were exported;those destined for the United States were powered by dual-ignition, turbocharged, Revmaster/Volkswagen VW 2962 engines.

== Variants ==
SZD-45 Ogar
The prototype powered by a 34 kW (45 hp) Stark-Stamo engine.
SZD-45A Ogar
Initial production variant powered by a 51 kW (68 hp) Limbach SL1700EC engines.
SZD-45-2 Ogar F
Later production aircraft powered bya 45 kW (60 hp) Franklin 2A-120A (later 2A-120CP) 2-cyl air-cooled horizontally opposed piston engine.

== Specifications (SZD-45A Ogar) ==
Data from Jane's World Sailplanes and Motor Gliders, Gliders & Sailplanes of the World, SZD-45 Ogar Type Certificate

General characteristics

- Crew: 2
- Length: 7.95 m (26 ft 1 in)
- Wingspan: 17.53 m (57 ft 6 in)
- Height: 1.72 m (5 ft 8 in)
- Wing area: 19.1 m^{2} (206 sq ft)
- Aspect ratio: 16.2
- Airfoil: Wortmann FX-61-168/1261
- Empty weight: 470 kg (1,036 lb)
- Max takeoff weight: 700 kg (1,543 lb)
- Fuel capacity: 22 kg (48.5 lb)
- Powerplant: 1 × Limbach SL 1700EC 4-cyl. air-cooled horizontally opposed piston engine, 50.7 kW (68.0 hp)
- Propellers: 2-bladed Hoffmann pusher propeller

Performance

- Maximum speed: 180 km/h (110 mph, 97 kn) at sea level in straight and level flight
- Stall speed: 68 km/h (42 mph, 37 kn)
- Max Rough air speed: 165 km/h (103 mph; 89 kn)
- Never exceed speed: 225 km/h (140 mph, 121 kn)
- Range: 549 km (341 mi, 296 nmi)
- Maximum glide ratio: 27.5 at 100 km/h (62 mph; 54 kn)
- Rate of sink: 0.96 m/s (189 ft/min) at 73 km/h (45 mph; 39 kn)
- Wing loading: 36.6 kg/m^{2} (7.5 lb/sq ft)
