= Saint-Maurice Castle =

Castle in Saint-Maurice, Switzerland

Coordinates: 46°13′24″N 7°00′11″E

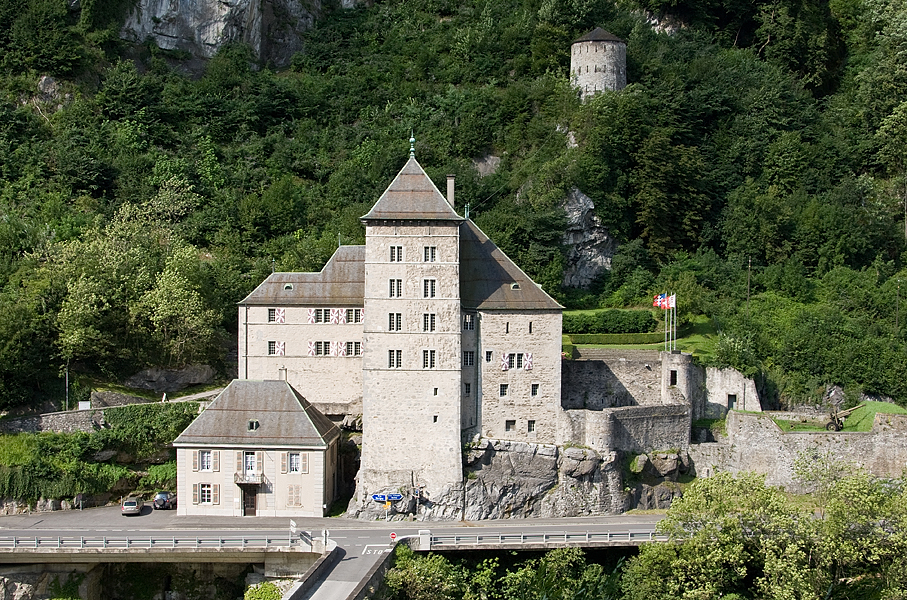
Saint-Maurice Castle

Saint-Maurice Castle is a castle in the municipality of Saint-Maurice of the Canton of Valais in Switzerland. It is a Swiss heritage site of national significance.

== History ==
In 1476, Bern began construction of a castle in the narrow Rhone valley at Saint-Maurice. It was completed in 1646 with the expansion of the residential buildings. However, in 1693 a devastating fire in the town, destroyed the warehouse of the castle and much of the gunpowder that was stored there.

== See also ==
- List of castles in Switzerland
- Château
