= Manduel =

- Commune
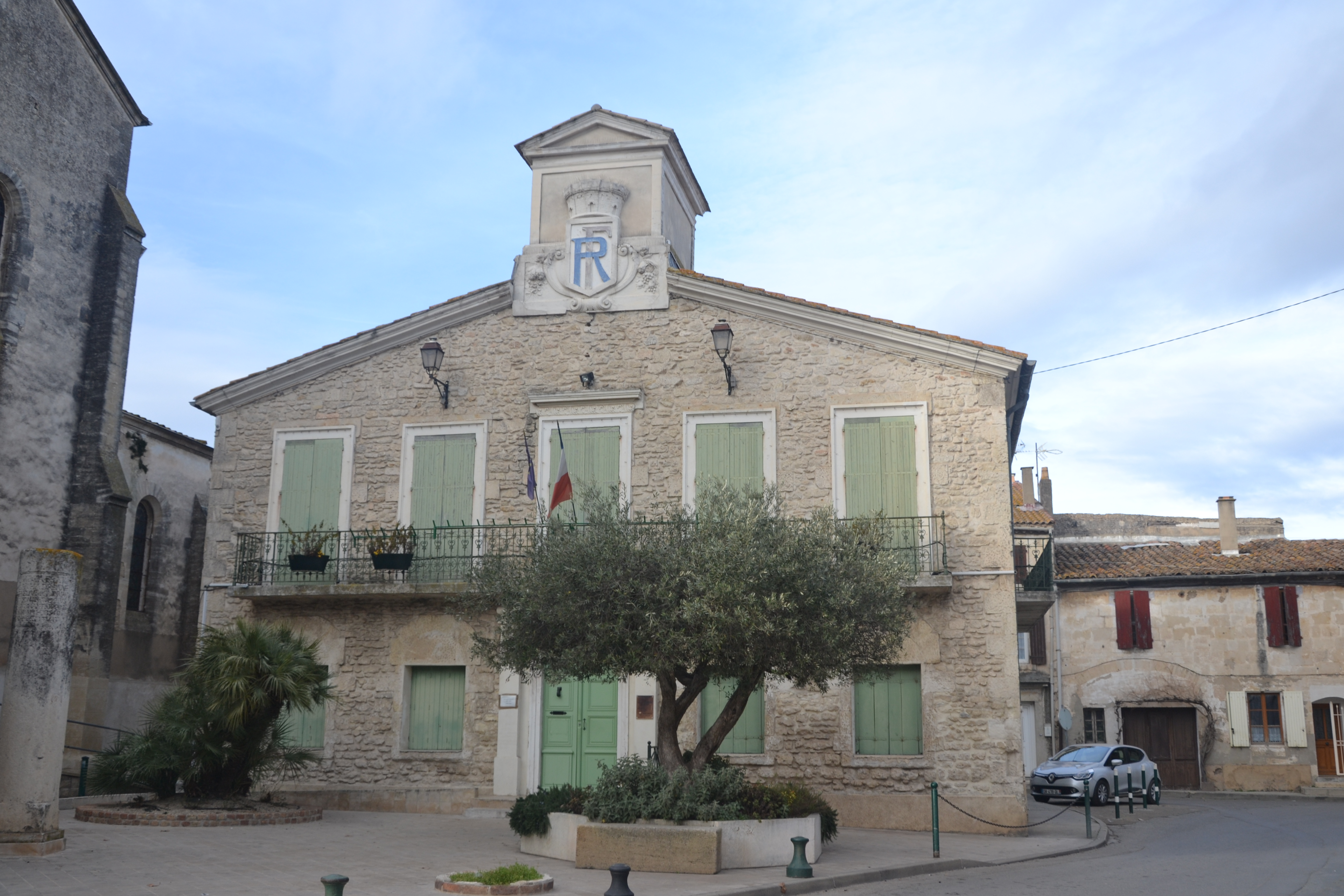
- The town hall in Manduel

- Coat of arms
- Location of Manduel
- Location within France Location within Occitanie
- Coordinates: 43°49′10″N 4°28′27″E
- Country: France
- Region: Occitania
- Department: Gard
- Arrondissement: Nîmes
- Canton: Marguerittes
- Intercommunality: CA Nîmes Métropole

Government
  - Mayor (2020–2026): Jean-Jacques Granat
- Area^{1}: 26.46 km^{2} (10.22 sq mi)
- Elevation: 62 m (203 ft)
- Highest elevation: 77 m (253 ft)
- Lowest elevation: 50 m (160 ft)
- Population (2023): 7,044
  - Density: 266.2/km^{2} (689.5/sq mi)
- Time zone: UTC+01:00 (CET)
  - Summer (DST): UTC+02:00 (CEST)
- INSEE/Postal code: 30155 /30129
- Website: www.manduel.fr
- ^{1} French Land Register data, which excludes lakes, ponds, glaciers > 1 km^{2} (0.386 sq mi or 247 acres) and river estuaries.

Manduel (French pronunciation: [mɑ̃dɥɛl]; Occitan: Manduèlh) is a commune in the Gard department in southern France. Nîmes-Pont-du-Gard station, with high speed connections to Paris and Perpignan and regional services to Avignon, Nîmes and Montpellier, is situated in the commune.

== Population ==
Historical population

Year	Pop.	±% p.a.
1936	1,459	—
1946	1,096	−2.82%
1954	1,314	+2.29%
1962	1,573	+2.27%
1968	1,649	+0.79%
1975	2,389	+5.44%
1982	3,554	+5.84%

Year	Pop.	±% p.a.
1990	5,579	+5.80%
1999	5,748	+0.33%
2007	5,725	−0.05%
2012	6,128	+1.37%
2017	6,814	+2.14%
2023	7,044	+0.55%

Source: EHESS and INSEE (1968-2023)

== Notable people ==
- François Fournier (1866–1941), politician

== See also ==
- Communes of the Gard department
- Costières de Nîmes AOC
