= Airconcept VoWi 10 =

VoWi 10

General information
- Type: Two-seat ultralight aircraft
- National origin: Germany
- Manufacturer: Airconcept Fleugzeug und Gerätebau GmbH
- Designer: Helmut Wilden

History
- First flight: 16 April 1975

The Airconcept VoWi-10 is a German two-seat ultralight monoplane designed by Helmut Wilden.

== Design and development ==
The single-seat prototype high-wing braced monoplane was built by Wilden and first flew 16 April 1975. Due to the interest raised by the prototype Wilden set about re-designing the type as a two-seater that would be capable of series production or in kit form for homebuilders. A new company Airconcept Flugzeug und Gerätebau GmbH was formed to produce and market the type. The prototype production two-seater first flew in 1978.

== Specifications ==
Data from Jane's All the World's Aircraft 1979–80

General characteristics

- Crew: 2
- Length: 5.89 m (19 ft 4 in)
- Wingspan: 11.00 m (36 ft 1 in)
- Height: 2.22 m (7 ft 3 in)
- Wing area: 13.00 m^{2} (139.9 sq ft)
- Airfoil: Gö 535 (modified)
- Empty weight: 270 kg (595 lb)
- Max takeoff weight: 430 kg (948 lb)
- Powerplant: 1 × Limbach SL1700 flat-four piston engine, 45 kW (60 hp)
- Propellers: 2-bladed fixed-pitch propeller

Performance

- Maximum speed: 160 km/h (99 mph, 86 kn)
- Cruise speed: 110–115 km/h (68–71 mph, 59–62 kn)
- Stall speed: 51 km/h (32 mph, 28 kn)
- Endurance: 2 hours (with 15 min reserves)
- Rate of climb: 3.50 m/s (689 ft/min)
