= Schleicher ASK 16 =

German touring motor glider, 1971

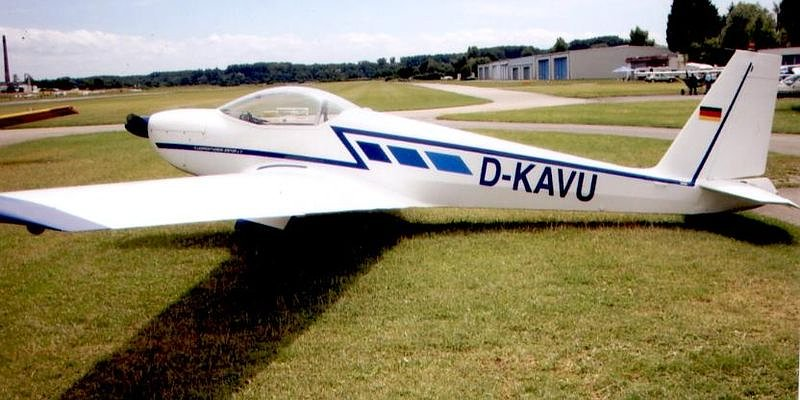
- Schleicher ASK 16 at Speyer-Edry airfield, Germany, in June 2007

General information
- Type: Touring motor glider
- National origin: Germany
- Manufacturer: Alexander Schleicher GmbH & Co
- Designer: Rudolf Kaiser
- Status: in service
- Primary user: club and private flyers
- Number built: 44

History
- Introduction date: 1972
- First flight: 2 February 1971

The ASK 16 was designed by Rudolf Kaiser for production by Alexander Schleicher GmbH & Co of Furth, Germany. The aircraft is of welded tube, wood and fabric construction and has a low-set high-aspect-ratio wing.

Seating is side-by-side for two persons under a fully transparent side-hinged canopy. The standard powerplant is a 72 hp (54 kW) Limbach L1700 driving a Hoffman variable-pitch propeller.

The ASK 16 has a retractable tail-wheel undercarriage with the main units mounted under the wings and retracting inwards. It is fitted with dual controls to permit use in the primary training role.

== Production and operation ==
The prototype first flew on 2 February 1971 and a total of 44 aircraft were built for operation by clubs and private owners. Most of the completed aircraft remained in active service in 2005, including examples flying in Germany, Ireland, Italy, Switzerland, Spain, the Netherlands and the United Kingdom.

== Specifications ==
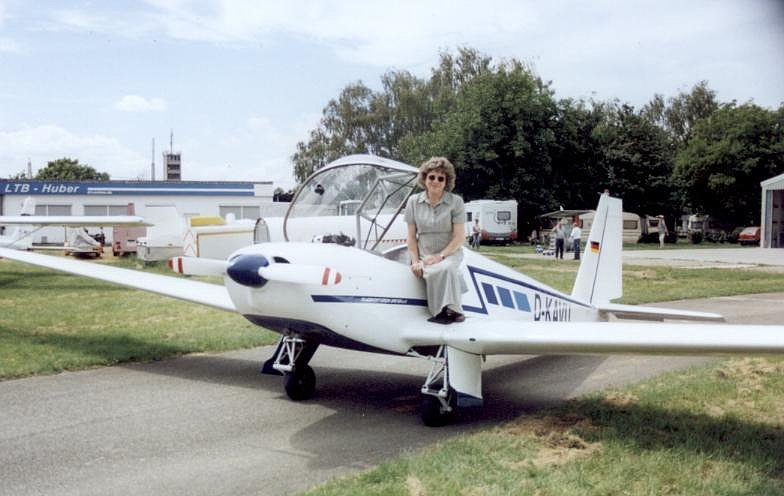
Schleicher ASK 16 showing arrangement of underwing retractable undercarriage and side-hinged canopy

Data from Airlife's World Aircraft, Jane's All The World's Aircraft 1971-72

General characteristics

- Crew: 2
- Capacity: 290 kg (640 lb)
- Length: 7.32 m (24 ft 0 in)
- Wingspan: 16 m (52 ft 6 in)
- Height: 2.1 m (6 ft 11 in)
- Wing area: 19 m^{2} (200 sq ft)
- Aspect ratio: 13.5
- Empty weight: 460 kg (1,014 lb)
- Max takeoff weight: 750 kg (1,653 lb)
- Powerplant: 1 × Limbach SL.1700.EBI 4-cylinder air-cooled horizontally-opposed piston engine, 54 kW (72 hp)
- Propellers: 2-bladed Hoffman variable-pitch propeller

Performance

- Cruise speed: 170 km/h (110 mph, 92 kn)
- Stall speed: 70 km/h (43 mph, 38 kn)
- Never exceed speed: 200 km/h (120 mph, 110 kn)
- Maximum glide ratio: 25:1 power off
- Rate of climb: 2.5 m/s (490 ft/min) powered
- Rate of sink: 1 m/s (200 ft/min)
- Wing loading: 36.8 kg/m^{2} (7.5 lb/sq ft)
- Take-off run: 230 m (750 ft)
- Landing run: 200 m (660 ft)
