= Lavey-Village =

Coordinates: 46°13′N 7°02′E

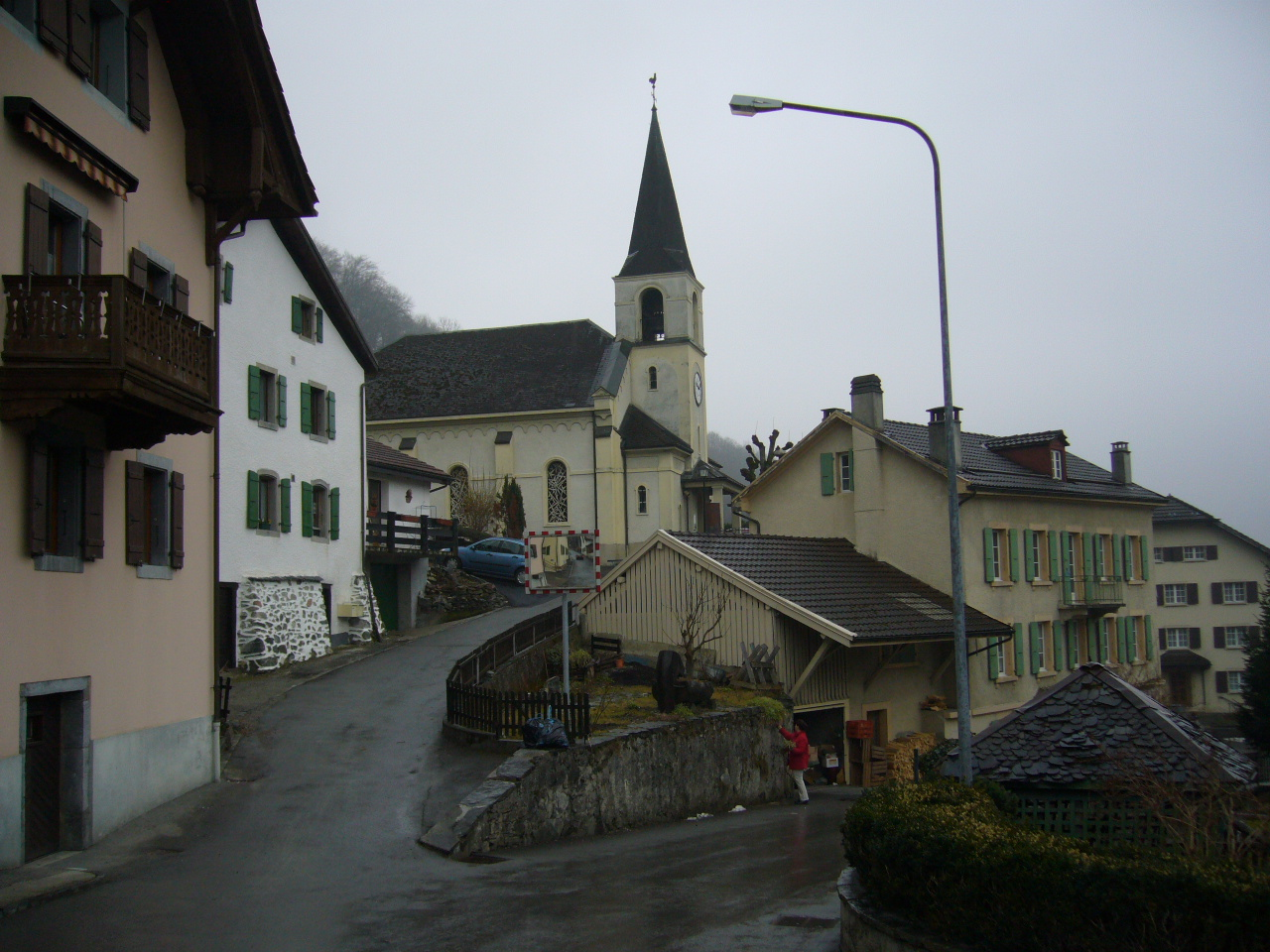
Church of Lavey-Village, municipality of Lavey-Morcles, canton of Vaud, Switzerland.

Lavey-Village is a village in the district of Aigle in the canton of Vaud, Switzerland.

The village was first recorded in the year 1016 as A Laver. In 1189 it was known as Laveto.

Lavey-Village is located in the former municipality Lavey. In 1852, Lavey municipality merged with its neighbor to form a new and larger municipality Lavey-Morcles.
