= Fournier RF7 =

German motor glider, 1970

RF7
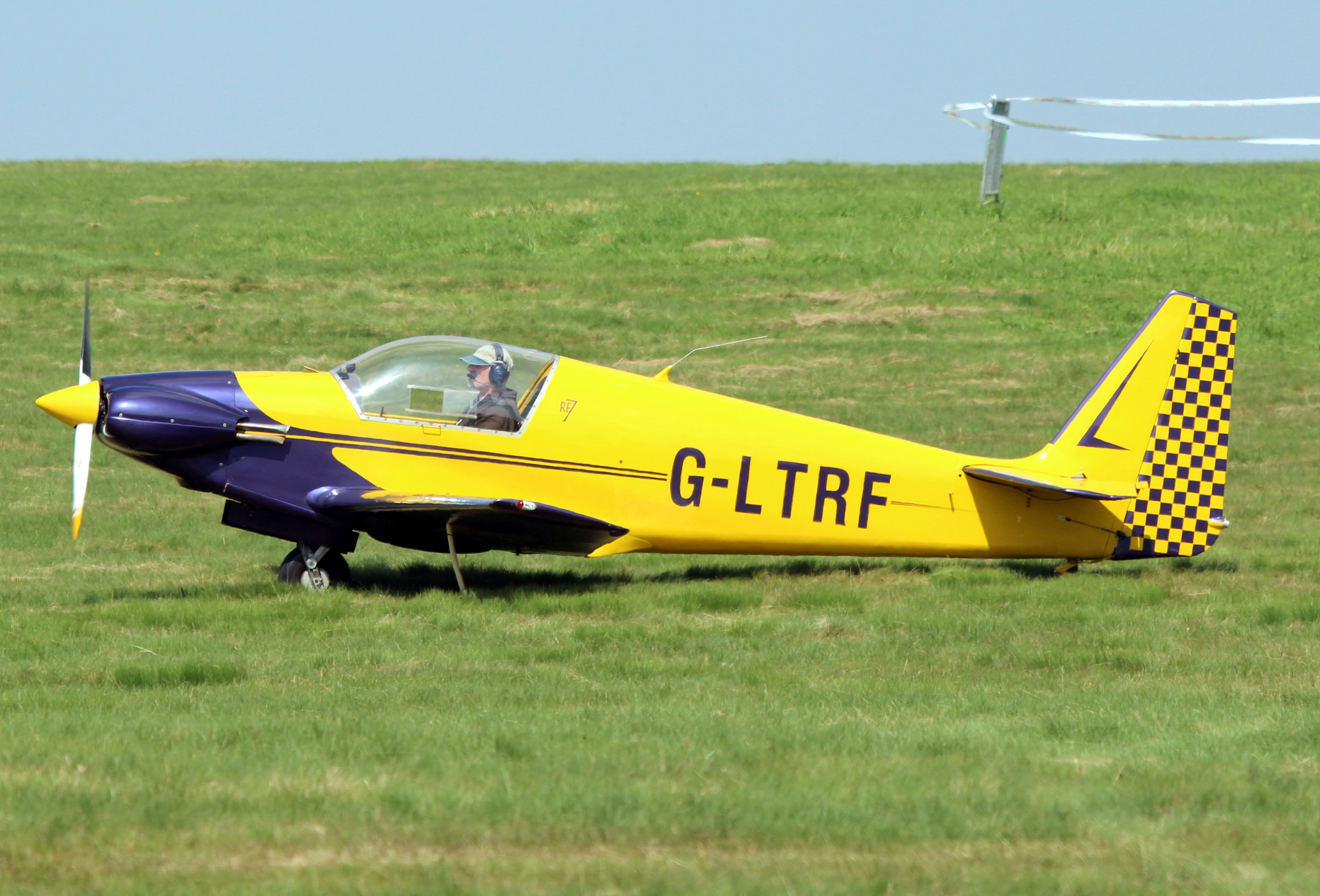
- The RF7 prototype as G-LTRF

General information
- Type: Motorglider
- National origin: France
- Manufacturer: Fournier
- Designer: René Fournier
- Number built: Two

History
- First flight: 5 March 1970
- Developed from: Fournier RF 4

The Fournier RF7 was a single-seat motorglider designed and built in prototype form by René Fournier in France in 1970 and intended for series production by Sportavia-Pützer in Germany.

== Design and development ==
The RF7 was a conventional motorglider design derived from Fournier's RF 4D, a low-wing cantilever monoplane with an engine mounted in tractor configuration in the nose. The sailplane-style undercarriage consisted of a retractable mainwheel, a fixed tailwheel, and small outriggers under each wing. Compared to the RF 4. the wings were shorter and the tailplane surfaces larger. The ailerons were also larger, and the RF7 was fully stressed for aerobatics.

Construction of the prototype (registered F-WPXV) began in July 1969, and the aircraft first flew on 5 March 1970. It was displayed at the Hanover Air Show the following month, where the journal Flight International praised it for the quality of its finish "[i]n spite of its prototype status." By 1971, Sportavia-Pützer abandoned its plans of series production of the type and hoped to market the RF7 in kit form instead. By 1978, all development had been abandoned and the prototype was offered for sale.

== Specifications ==
Data from Taylor 1972, p.96

General characteristics

- Crew: one pilot
- Length: 6.05 m (19 ft 11 in)
- Wingspan: 9.40 m (30 ft 11 in)
- Wing area: 10.0 m^{2} (108 sq ft)
- Empty weight: 300 kg (660 lb)
- Gross weight: 445 kg (981 lb)
- Powerplant: 1 × Sportavia-Limbach SL 1700 D , 51 kW (68 hp)

Performance

- Cruise speed: 220 km/h (137 mph, 119 kn)
- Range: 650 km (403 mi, 350 nmi)
- Service ceiling: 7,000 m (23,000 ft)

== See also ==
Related lists

- List of motor gliders
