= Akaflieg Darmstadt D-39 =

German single-seat motor glider, 1979

D-39

General information
- Type: Motor glider
- National origin: Germany
- Manufacturer: Akaflieg Darmstadt
- Number built: 1

History
- First flight: 28 June 1979
- Developed from: Akaflieg Darmstadt D-38

The Akaflieg Darmstadt D-39 was a single-seat motor glider derived from the D-38 sailplane. Built in Germany in the late 1970s, it was not intended for production and only one was constructed.

== Design and development ==
The D-39 was a motorised version of the D-38 sailplane, with wings moved down from the latter's shoulder-wing position to the bottom of the fuselage. A Limbach SL 1700 flat four engine was conventionally mounted in the nose; the propeller could be removed but not folded away in flight. The wings, with 4° of dihedral, tail and monocoque fuselage were formed from glass fibre balsa sandwiches and the ailerons from glass fibre/Klégécel foam sandwiches. The D-38 had an all moving T-tailplane, fitted with a Flettner tab. It landed on a retractable monowheel, fitted with a drum brake and assisted by a small, fixed tailwheel.

The D-39 was first flown on 28 June 1979. By July 1982 it had been modified into the D-39b, with a greater span, revised wing roots and fitted with two-bladed Hoffmann Propeller airscrew and three pitch positions. The „D-39HKW“ was developed on the fuselage of the D-39, using 20-Meter flapped wing V

== Variants ==
D-39
Original version
D-39b
Same aircraft modified with greater span, revised roots and a new propeller.

== Specifications (D-39) ==
Data from Jane's All the World's Aircraft 1981/2

General characteristics

- Crew: 1
- Length: 7.15 m (23 ft 5 in)
- Wingspan: 15.00 m (49 ft 3 in)
- Height: 1.02 m (3 ft 4 in) over fuselage, not tail
- Wing area: 11.00 m^{2} (118.4 sq ft) gross
- Aspect ratio: 20.5
- Airfoil: Wortmann FX-61-184 at root, FX-60-126 at tip
- Empty weight: 370 kg (816 lb)
- Max takeoff weight: 470 kg (1,036 lb)
- Fuel capacity: 35 L (9.25 US gal; 7.7 Imp gal)
- Powerplant: 1 × Limbach SL 1700E flat four, 51 kW (68 hp)
- Propellers: 2-bladed

Performance

- Maximum speed: 280 km/h (170 mph, 150 kn)
- Stall speed: 80 km/h (50 mph, 43 kn)
- Maximum glide ratio: 36 best, without propeller at 84 km/h (52 mph; 45 kn)
- Rate of sink: 0.7 m/s (140 ft/min) minimum, without propeller at 105 km/h (65 mph; 56.5 kn)
- Wing loading: 42.0 kg/m^{2} (8.6 lb/sq ft) Maximum
