= Lavey-les-Bains =

Coordinates: 46°12′N 7°02′E

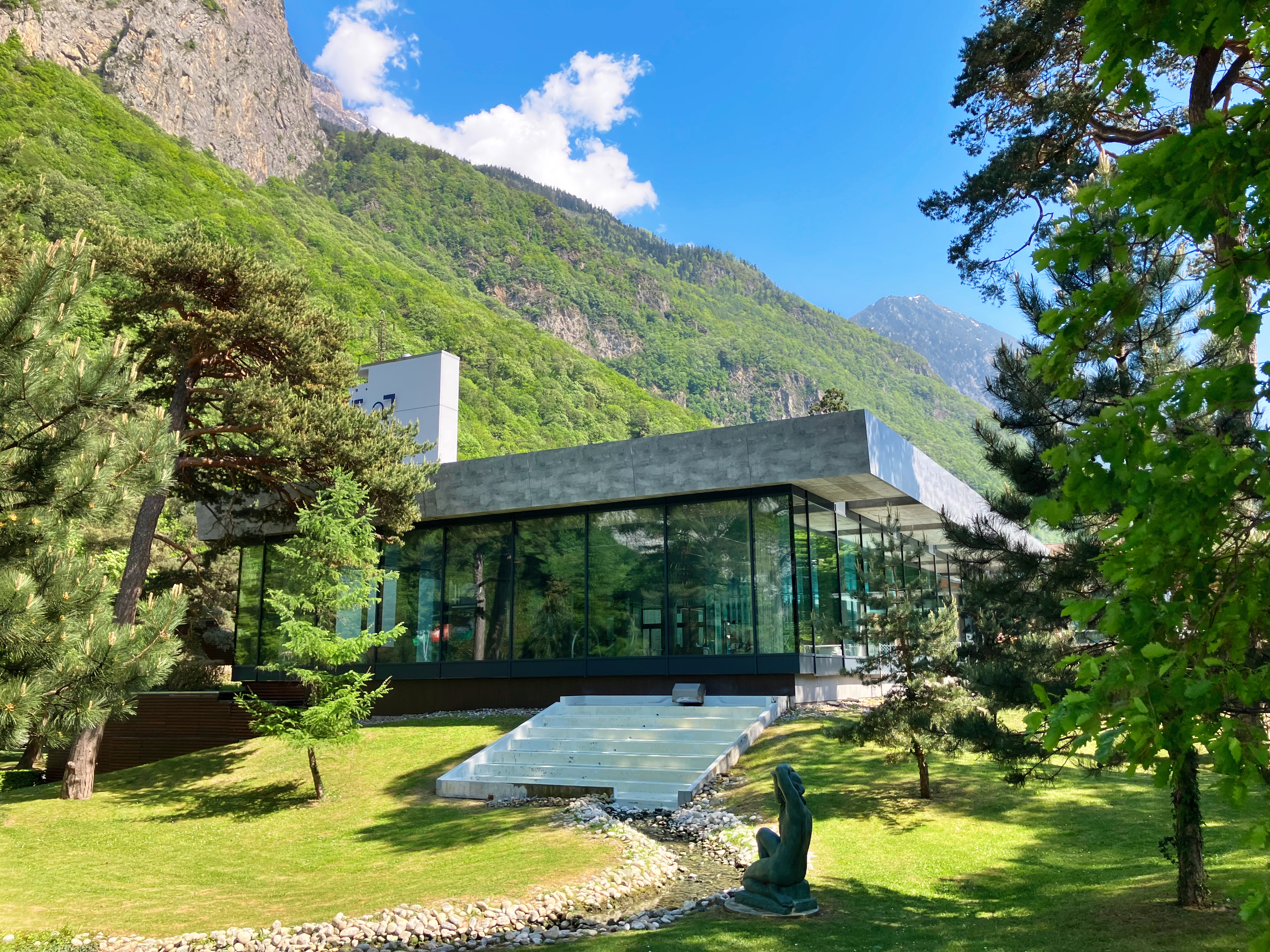
view of the Lavey Baths

Lavey-les-Bains is a village in the district of Aigle in the canton of Vaud, Switzerland.

Lavey-les-Bains is located in the former municipality Lavey. In 1852 Lavey municipality merged with its neighbor to form a new and larger municipality Lavey-Morcles.
