= François Fournier (French politician) =

French politician (1866–1941)

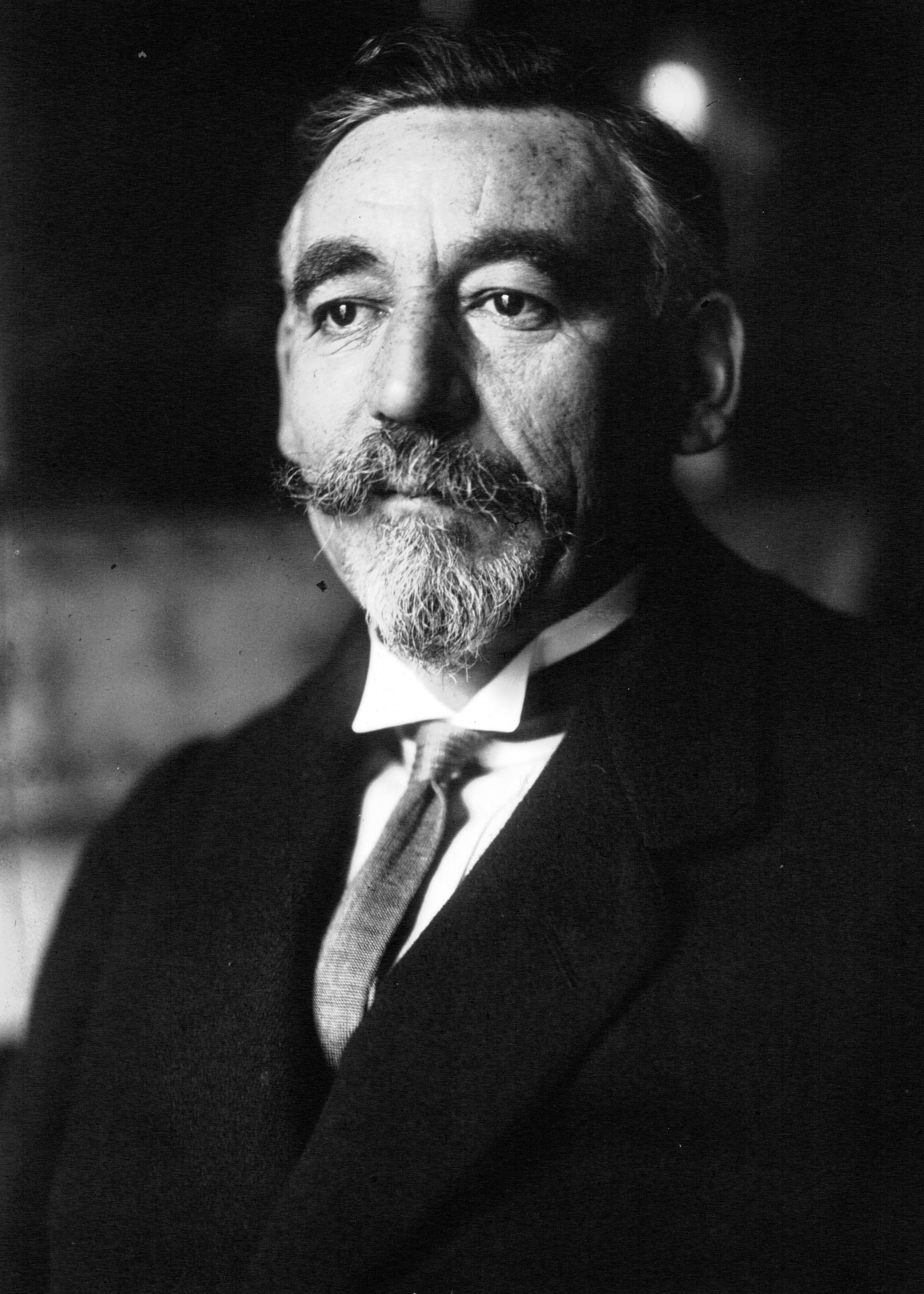
- François Fournier in 1918

Member of Parliament for the French National Assembly
- In office 1901–1919

Personal details
- Born: François Fournier; 14 August 1866; Manduel, Gard
- Died: 27 May 1941 (aged 74); Manduel, Gard

François Fournier (14 August 1866 in Manduel (Gard) – 27 May 1941 in Manduel) was a French politician.

== Mandates ==
- Member of Parliament for the Gard région in France from 1901 to 1919
