= Fournier Island =

Island in the Schollaert Channel in Antarctica

- Location within Antarctica

Geography
- Location: Antarctica
- Coordinates: 64°33′S 62°49′W
- Archipelago: Palmer Archipelago

Administration
- Administered under the Antarctic Treaty System

Demographics
- Population: Uninhabited

Fournier Island is a small island in the southern Schollaert Channel, lying 1 kilometre (0.5 nmi) off the eastern extremity of Anvers Island, in the Palmer Archipelago. The island was charted but left unnamed by the French Antarctic Expedition, 1903–05. The name appears on Argentine charts dating back to 1950, and honors the ship Fournier which took part in the Argentine Antarctic Expedition of 1947. In 1948 the vessel was wrecked in the Strait of Magellan.

== See also ==
- List of Antarctic and sub-Antarctic islands
