= Lavey-Morcles =

- Municipality
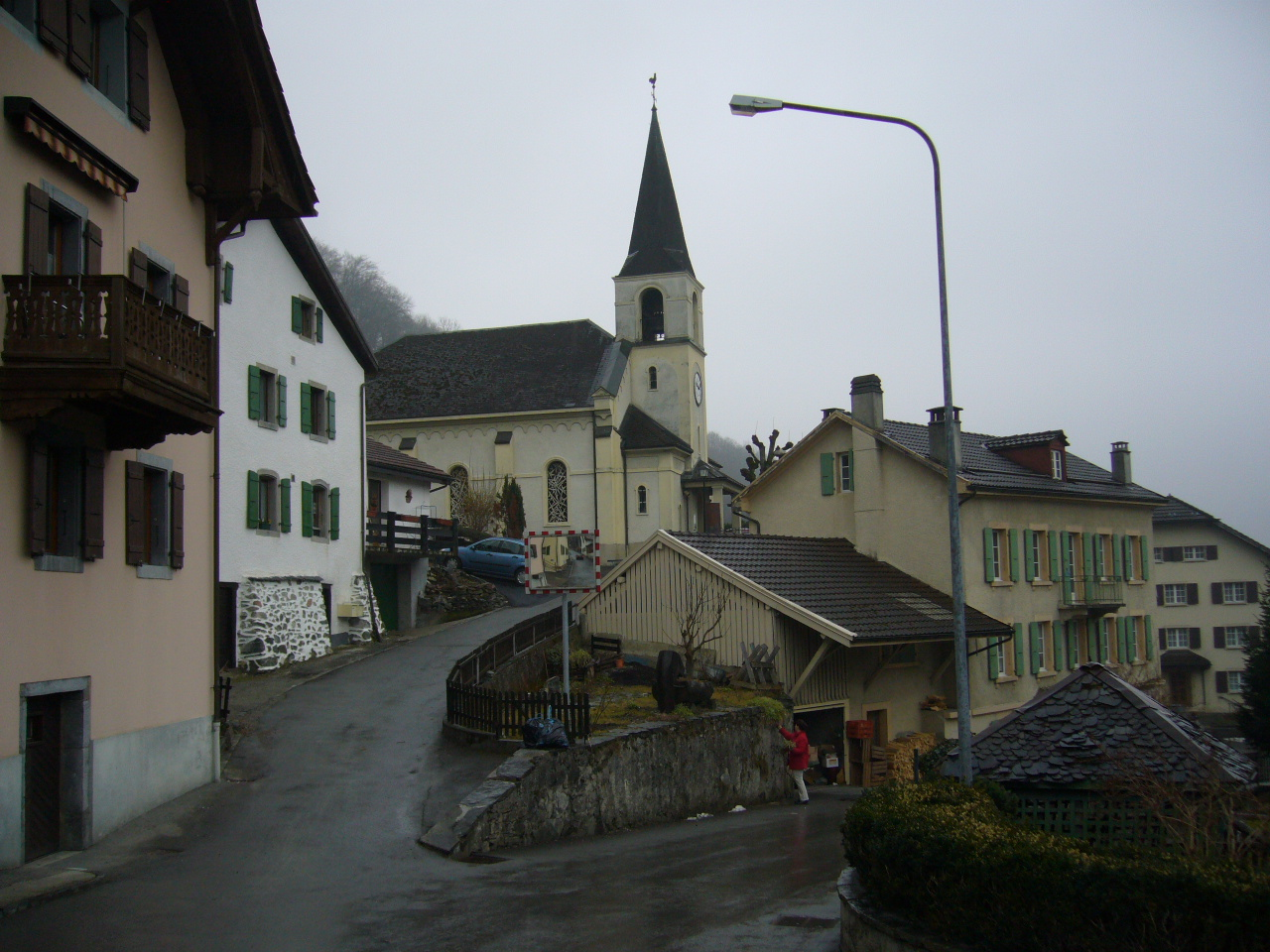

- Flag Coat of arms
- Location of Lavey-Morcles
- Location within Switzerland Location within Canton of Vaud
- Coordinates: 46°12′N 7°02′E
- Country: Switzerland
- Canton: Vaud
- District: Aigle

Government
  - Mayor: Syndic

Area
  - Total: 14.19 km^{2} (5.48 sq mi)
- Elevation: 444 m (1,457 ft)

Population (2000)
  - Total: 813
  - Density: 57.3/km^{2} (148/sq mi)
- Demonym(s): Lavey:Roccans; Morcles:Morclans
- Time zone: UTC+01:00 (CET)
  - Summer (DST): UTC+02:00 (CEST)
- Postal code: 1892
- SFOS number: 5406
- ISO 3166 code: CH-VD
- Localities: Lavey-Village, Lavey-les-Bains, Eslex, Morcles
- Surrounded by: Bex, Collonges (VS), Saint-Maurice (VS)
- Website: lavey.ch

Lavey-Morcles is a municipality in Switzerland in the canton of Vaud, located in the district of Aigle.

The municipality was created in 1852 by a merger of Morcles and Lavey.

== History ==
Lavey-Morcles is first mentioned in 1016 as A Laver. In 1189 it was mentioned as Laveto and as Lavey.

== Geography ==
Lavey-Morcles has an area, as of 2009, of 14.19 square kilometers (5.48 sq mi). Of this area, 2.6 km^{2} (1.0 sq mi) or 18.3% is used for agricultural purposes, while 8.93 km^{2} (3.45 sq mi) or 62.9% is forested. Of the rest of the land, 0.73 km^{2} (0.28 sq mi) or 5.1% is settled (buildings or roads), 0.2 km^{2} (0.077 sq mi) or 1.4% is either rivers or lakes and 1.68 km^{2} (0.65 sq mi) or 11.8% is unproductive land.

Of the built up area, housing and buildings made up 2.8% and transportation infrastructure made up 1.5%. Out of the forested land, 56.9% of the total land area is heavily forested and 2.5% is covered with orchards or small clusters of trees. Of the agricultural land, 2.0% is used for growing crops and 3.2% is pastures and 12.9% is used for alpine pastures. All the water in the municipality is flowing water. Of the unproductive areas, 5.0% is unproductive vegetation and 6.8% is too rocky for vegetation.

The municipality is located in the Aigle district, on the right bank of the Rhone river. It was created in 1852 when Lavey and Morcles merged. It consists of the villages of Lavey-Village (across from Saint-Maurice), Lavey-les-Bains, Eslex and Morcles.

== Coat of arms ==
The blazon of the municipal coat of arms is Vert, a Rooster Argent, crested, langued, beaked and armed Gules.

== Demographics ==
Lavey-Morcles has a population (as of December 2020) of 944. As of 2008, 14.7% of the population are resident foreign nationals. Over the last 10 years (1999–2009) the population has changed at a rate of 7.2%. It has changed at a rate of 7.3% due to migration and at a rate of 1.4% due to births and deaths.

Most of the population (as of 2000) speaks French (695 or 89.0%), with German being second most common (42 or 5.4%) and Serbo-Croatian being third (18 or 2.3%). There are 13 people who speak Italian and 1 person who speaks Romansh.

Of the population in the municipality 232 or about 29.7% were born in Lavey-Morcles and lived there in 2000. There were 189 or 24.2% who were born in the same canton, while 221 or 28.3% were born somewhere else in Switzerland, and 118 or 15.1% were born outside of Switzerland.

In 2008 there were 7 live births to Swiss citizens and 1 birth to non-Swiss citizens, and in same time span there were 9 deaths of Swiss citizens. Ignoring immigration and emigration, the population of Swiss citizens decreased by 2 while the foreign population increased by 1. There was 1 Swiss woman who immigrated back to Switzerland. At the same time, there were 4 non-Swiss men and 8 non-Swiss women who immigrated from another country to Switzerland. The total Swiss population change in 2008 (from all sources, including moves across municipal borders) was an increase of 12 and the non-Swiss population increased by 7 people. This represents a population growth rate of 2.4%.

The age distribution, as of 2009, in Lavey-Morcles is; 99 children or 11.6% of the population are between 0 and 9 years old and 81 teenagers or 9.5% are between 10 and 19. Of the adult population, 99 people or 11.6% of the population are between 20 and 29 years old. 108 people or 12.7% are between 30 and 39, 117 people or 13.7% are between 40 and 49, and 132 people or 15.5% are between 50 and 59. The senior population distribution is 99 people or 11.6% of the population are between 60 and 69 years old, 63 people or 7.4% are between 70 and 79, there are 47 people or 5.5% who are 80 and 89, and there are 6 people or 0.7% who are 90 and older.

As of 2000, there were 284 people who were single and never married in the municipality. There were 380 married individuals, 56 widows or widowers and 61 individuals who are divorced.

As of 2000, there were 349 private households in the municipality, and an average of 2.2 persons per household. There were 126 households that consist of only one person and 19 households with five or more people. Out of a total of 359 households that answered this question, 35.1% were households made up of just one person and there were 3 adults who lived with their parents. Of the rest of the households, there are 107 married couples without children, 88 married couples with children There were 21 single parents with a child or children. There were 4 households that were made up of unrelated people and 10 households that were made up of some sort of institution or another collective housing.

In 2000 there were 166 single family homes (or 63.6% of the total) out of a total of 261 inhabited buildings. There were 70 multi-family buildings (26.8%), along with 14 multi-purpose buildings that were mostly used for housing (5.4%) and 11 other use buildings (commercial or industrial) that also had some housing (4.2%). Of the single family homes 36 were built before 1919, while 8 were built between 1990 and 2000. The most multi-family homes (32) were built before 1919 and the next most (11) were built between 1919 and 1945.

In 2000 there were 484 apartments in the municipality. The most common apartment size was 3 rooms of which there were 172. There were 19 single room apartments and 94 apartments with five or more rooms. Of these apartments, a total of 339 apartments (70.0% of the total) were permanently occupied, while 88 apartments (18.2%) were seasonally occupied and 57 apartments (11.8%) were empty. As of 2009, the construction rate of new housing units was 1.2 new units per 1000 residents. The vacancy rate for the municipality, in 2010, was 0%.

The historical population is given in the following chart:

== Politics ==
In the 2007 federal election the most popular party was the SVP which received 37.31% of the vote. The next three most popular parties were the FDP (20.9%), the SP (15.26%) and the Green Party (9.02%). In the federal election, a total of 260 votes were cast, and the voter turnout was 46.3%.

== Economy ==
As of 2010, Lavey-Morcles had an unemployment rate of 6.1%. As of 2008, there were 11 people employed in the primary economic sector and about 5 businesses involved in this sector. 60 people were employed in the secondary sector and there were 7 businesses in this sector. 123 people were employed in the tertiary sector, with 18 businesses in this sector. There were 362 residents of the municipality who were employed in some capacity, of which females made up 43.1% of the workforce.

In 2008 the total number of full-time equivalent jobs was 172. The number of jobs in the primary sector was 7, all of which were in agriculture. The number of jobs in the secondary sector was 56 of which 7 or (12.5%) were in manufacturing and 28 (50.0%) were in construction. The number of jobs in the tertiary sector was 109. In the tertiary sector; 10 or 9.2% were in wholesale or retail sales or the repair of motor vehicles, 2 or 1.8% were in the movement and storage of goods, 51 or 46.8% were in a hotel or restaurant, 3 or 2.8% were technical professionals or scientists, and 17 or 15.6% were in health care.

In 2000, there were 211 workers who commuted into the municipality and 256 workers who commuted away. The municipality is a net exporter of workers, with about 1.2 workers leaving the municipality for every one entering. Of the working population, 11% used public transportation to get to work, and 66% used a private car.

== Religion ==
From the 2000 census, 363 or 46.5% were Roman Catholic, while 306 or 39.2% belonged to the Swiss Reformed Church. Of the rest of the population, there were 7 members of an Orthodox church (or about 0.90% of the population), there was 1 individual who belongs to the Christian Catholic Church, and there were 8 individuals (or about 1.02% of the population) who belonged to another Christian church. There were 9 (or about 1.15% of the population) who were Islamic. There was 1 person who was Buddhist and 1 individual who belonged to another church. 56 (or about 7.17% of the population) belonged to no church, are agnostic or atheist, and 29 individuals (or about 3.71% of the population) did not answer the question.

== Education ==
In Lavey-Morcles about 303 or (38.8%) of the population have completed non-mandatory upper secondary education, and 53 or (6.8%) have completed additional higher education (either university or a Fachhochschule). Of the 53 who completed tertiary schooling, 49.1% were Swiss men, 32.1% were Swiss women, 11.3% were non-Swiss men.

In the 2009/2010 school year there was 1 student in the Lavey-Morcles school district. In the Vaud cantonal school system, two years of non-obligatory pre-school are provided by the political districts. During the school year, the district provided pre-school care for a total of 205 children of which 96 children (46.8%) received subsidized pre-school care. There were no students in the primary school program, which lasts four years. The obligatory lower secondary school program lasts for six years and there was 1 student in this school.

As of 2000, there were 72 students in Lavey-Morcles who came from another municipality, while 82 residents attended schools outside the municipality.
