= Christophe Fournier =

Dr. Christophe Fournier was the formal president of the Médecins Sans Frontières organisation (MSF).

== Career ==
Fournier received an M.D. from the Université d'Auvergne in Clermont-Ferrand, France, and holds a degree in tropical medicine, epidemiology and biostatistics. He has worked as a doctor or head of mission in field projects in Burundi, Uganda, Honduras and Chile, as well as conducting emergency exploratory missions in Mexico and Venezuela. In 2000, he became MSF's operations manager, working in the United States, and managing field programs in Guatemala, Haiti, Nigeria, Sudan, Cambodia, Myanmar and Thailand. He became president in December 2006.
