= Blessing Rebell =

German two-seat motor glider, 1973

Rebell

General information
- Type: Motor glider
- National origin: Germany
- Designer: Gerhard Blessing
- Number built: 1

History
- First flight: 3 June 1973

The Blessing Rebell was a one/two seat motorglider designed for amateur construction in Germany. Only one was built, flying for the first time in 1973 in a pusher configuration. It was later modified and flew in 1980 as a tractor aircraft.

== Design and development ==
The Rebell was designed by Gerhard Blessing as a self-launching glider suitable for amateur builders, even those working in confined workspaces. To allow this, the wing could be built in one, two or three parts and no individual component was more than 3.5 m (11 ft 6 in) long.

The Rebell had low-mid set wings built around a single wooden spar and wood covered. They had dihedral only on the outer panels, each 3.75 m (12 ft 4 in) long and foldable for storage. The fuselage was a steel tube structure, wood covered and had a roughly rectangular cross-section. The canopy was quite long and normally enclosed just a single seat, but there was space to place a second seat in tandem behind the first. The engine, originally a 40 kW (54 hp) Hirth M28 twin cylinder unit, was placed over the wing behind the cockpit with the propeller shaft at the top of the fuselage, locating the propeller just behind the trailing edge of the wing. Aft, the fuselage became a low-set boom, bearing wooden tail surfaces including a swept, straight edged vertical tail with a long dorsal fillet. The Rebell had a recessed monowheel undercarriage assisted by a tailwheel and two stabilizing wheels mounted at the extreme inner wing panels.

The first flight was made on 3 June 1973. In 1974 the Hirth company went into liquidation and an alternative engine was needed; in the Summer of 1975 the Rebell prototype was flying with a modified Volkswagen motor. Further testing in this form led to a major power plant/fuselage rebuild, started in 1976. The result, renamed the Staff Rebell, had a tractor configuration Limbach SL1700 engine in the nose. The fuselage, its wooden covering replaced with Dacron, became deeper behind the cockpit and no longer a boom; the dorsal fillet was removed. The canopy was also re-shaped, curving down to rather than merging horizontally into the dorsal line.

The Staff Rebell first flew in August 1980.

== Operational history ==
The sole Rebell/Staff Rebell D-KEBO was no longer on the German civil register in 2010.

== Variants ==
Rebell
Original version with pusher configuration engine, first a Hirth M28 then a modified Volkswagen from Summer 1975.
Staff Rebell
Major fuselage redesign with tractor configuration Limbach SL1700 engine. First flown August 1980.

== Specifications (Hirth engine) ==
Data from Jane's All the World's Aircraft 1976-77

General characteristics

- Crew: one
- Capacity: one passenger
- Length: 7.20 m (23 ft 7 in)
- Wingspan: 15.00 m (49 ft 3 in)
- Wing area: 17.00 m^{2} (183.0 sq ft)
- Aspect ratio: 13.2
- Airfoil: Root Wortmann FX-66-S-196, tip FX-66-17A
- Empty weight: 420 kg (926 lb)
- Gross weight: 620 kg (1,367 lb)
- Powerplant: 1 × Hirth M28 2-cylinder, 40 kW (54 hp)
- Propellers: 2-bladed Hoffmann feathering pusher

Performance

- Maximum speed: 200 km/h (120 mph, 110 kn) powered, maximum take-off weight
- Cruise speed: 150 km/h (93 mph, 81 kn) powered, maximum take-off weight
- Range: 600 km (370 mi, 320 nmi) powered, maximum take-off weight
- Maximum glide ratio: 24:1, power off
- Rate of climb: 3.0 m/s (590 ft/min) powered, maximum take-off weight
