= Jean-François Fournier =

Jean-François Fournier (born 12 January 1966 in Saint-Maurice, Switzerland) is a writer, playwright, poet and biographer Vaud.

After a Degree in philosophy and letters from the Academy of Grenoble, he attended the University of Fribourg. He then decided to practice journalism and attended the Romand Training Centre for Journalists. He worked for the newspapers Le Nouveau Quotidien and Le Matin and then moved to Canada.

He was awarded the first Prize of Poetry from the Vaud Association of Writers in 1983. He received the 1988 Journalism Award from the Council of Europe, and in 1998, the canton of Valais awarded him an award for his entire literary production.

== Publications ==
- Alcools de Vienne (novel), L'Âge d'Homme, Lausanne, 1989
- Jacques, fils du tonnerre (novel), L'Âge d'Homme, Lausanne, 1994
- Triptyque (novel), Ed. l'Hexagone, Montréal, 1998
- Acqua alta (novel), L'Âge d'Homme, Lausanne, 2000
- La nuit qui tua Juan Don (novel), L'Âge d'Homme, Lausanne, 2002
- Par-dessus le vide (poem), Ed. La Matze, Sion, 1987
- Expo.02 : c'est ça, la Suisse ? (art critique, joint work), L'Âge d'Homme, Lausanne, 2002
- Egon Schiele ou la décadence de Vienne, 1890-1918 (biography), Ed. Jean-Claude Lattès, Paris, 1992
- Jacques Villeneuve : au nom du père et du fils (biography), Ed. Chronosports, Saint-Barthélémy, 1996
- Librairie, corps et âmes (joint work), Ed. Vinci, Paris, 1993
- Ligne de métro (joint work), L'Hexagone et VLB éditeur, Montréal, 2002
- Souviens-toi, Nendaz : promenades d'écrivains (joint work), Ed. IGN, Nendaz, 2003
- Don Maifisto (theatre, with music by Henri-Louis Matter), Ed. Vinci, Paris, 1993.
