= Lavey, Switzerland =

Former Swiss municipality

Coordinates: 46°13′N 7°02′E

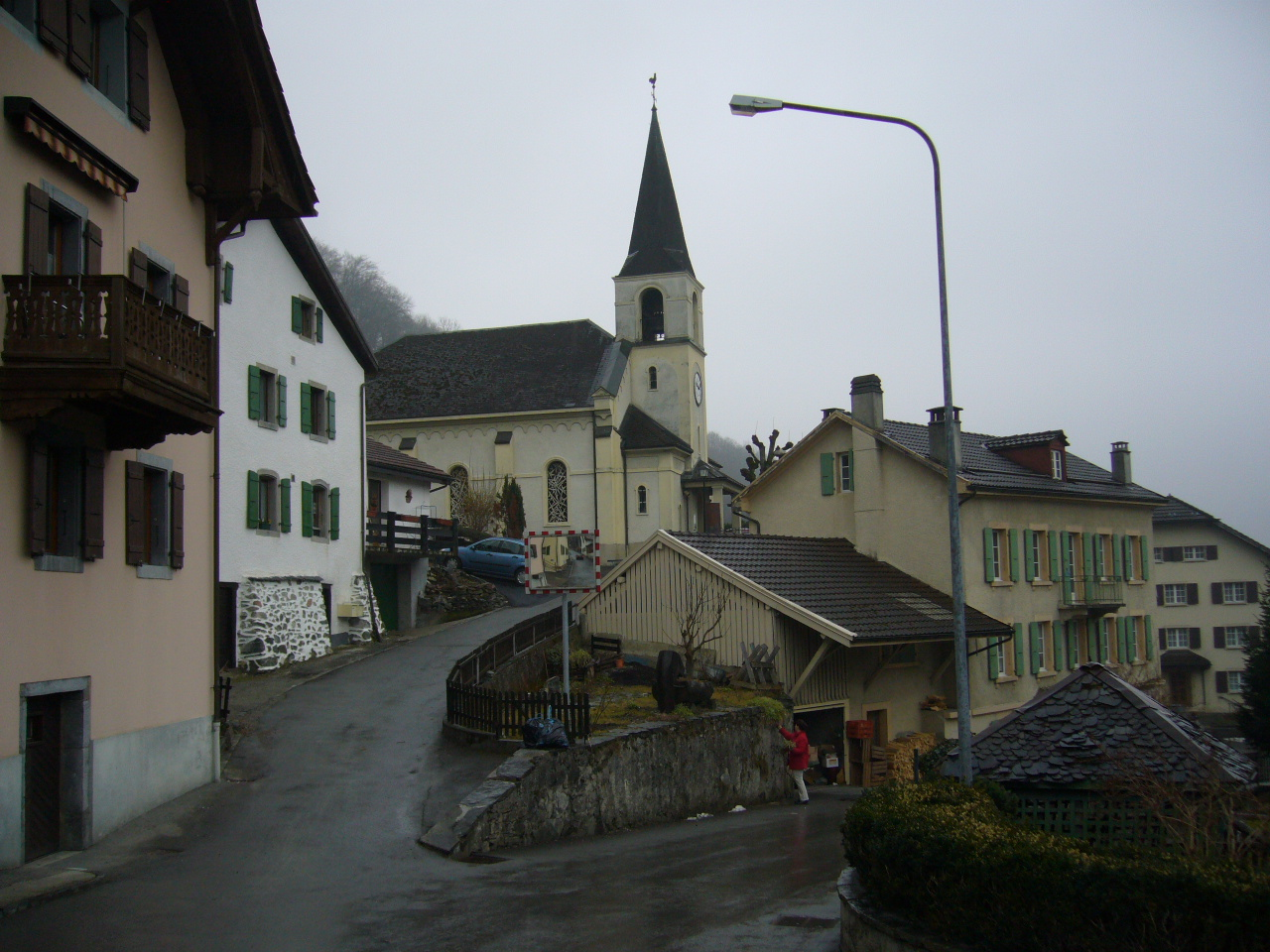
The church at Lavey

Lavey is a former municipality in the district of Aigle in the canton of Vaud, Switzerland.

It was first recorded in year 1016 as A Laver. In 1189 it was known as Laveto.

The municipality contained the villages Lavey-Village and Lavey-les-Bains. It had 138 inhabitants in 1764, which increased to 185 in 1803 and 251 in 1850.

In 1970 the municipality was merged with the neighboring municipality Morcles to form a new and larger municipality, Lavey-Morcles.
