= Fournier RF 5 =

German touring motor glider, 1968

RF 5
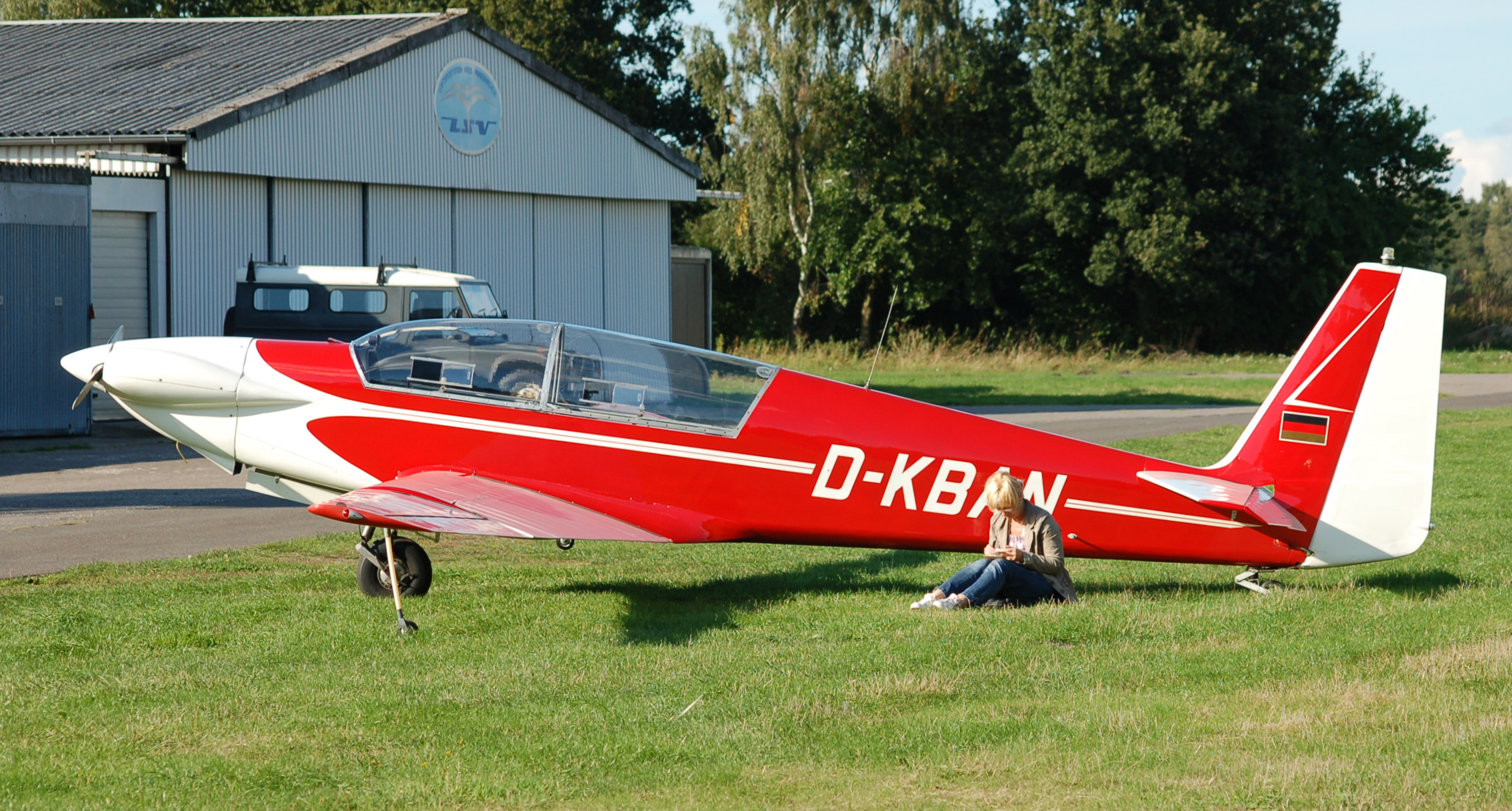

General information
- Type: Motorglider
- National origin: France
- Designer: René Fournier

History
- First flight: January 1968

The Fournier RF 5 is a two-seat motor glider designed by René Fournier .

== Design and development ==
The RF 5 is based on the single seater Fournier RF 4, and is a low-winged monoplane of all-wooden construction, with the crew of two sat in a tandem enclosed cockpit. It is semi-aerobatic with loops, stall turns, lazy eights, chandelles and spins approved. It has a manually retractable center landing gear, a steerable tailwheel and detachable outrigger landing gear. Spoilers are available to reduce lift. The wingtips of the parked aircraft can be unlocked and folded inwards by a single person to reduce required hangar space.

== Variants ==
RF 5B
An improved high-performance version. Powered by a 50.7 kW (68 hp) Limbach SL 1700 E Comet engine. One prototype build by Alpavia.
RF 5B Sperber
A high performance powered sailplane with 17.5 m (57 ft) span wings. Build by Sportavia-Putzer Gmbh. U Co. Kg.
AeroJaén RF5-AJ1 Serrania
License built version produced by Aeronáutica del Jaén SA
TZ-3
Brazilian Air Force designation of the RF 5.

== Specifications (RF 5) ==
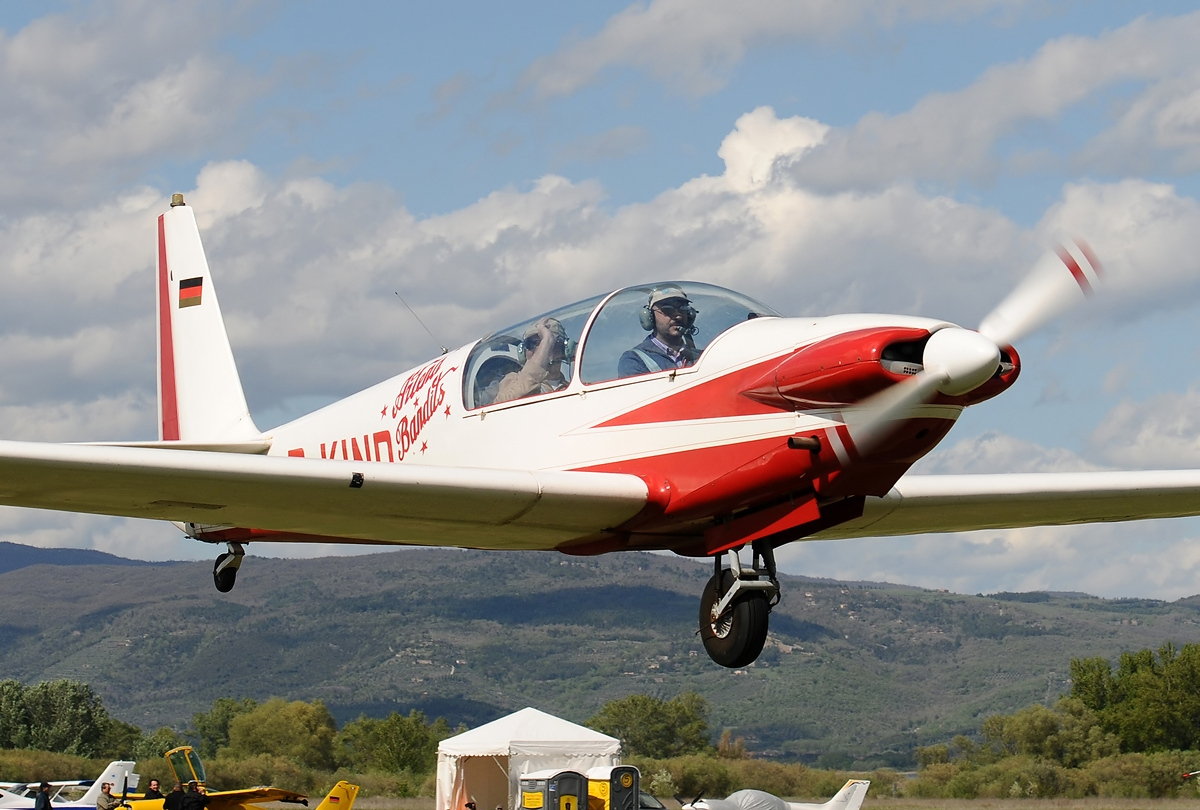
Fournier RF 5 in-flight

Data from Jane's All the World's Aircraft 1988-89, Jane's All The World's Aircraft 1976–77

General characteristics

- Crew: 2
- Length: 7.8 m (25 ft 7 in)
- Wingspan: 13.74 m (45 ft 1 in)
- Width: 8.6 m (28 ft 3 in) wings folded
- Height: 1.96 m (6 ft 5 in)
- Wing area: 15.12 m^{2} (162.8 sq ft)
- Aspect ratio: 12.5
- Airfoil: root:NACA 23015, tip:NACA 23012
- Empty weight: 420 kg (926 lb)
- Max takeoff weight: 650 kg (1,433 lb)
- Fuel capacity: 60 L (15.9 US gal; 13.2 imp gal)
- Powerplant: 1 × Limbach L2000 EOI 4-cyl. horizontally-opposed air-cooled piston engine, 60 kW (80 hp)
- Propellers: 2-bladed Hoffman HO-V-62-R/160 fixed pitch propeller

Performance

- Cruise speed: 209 km/h (130 mph, 113 kn)
- Stall speed: 80 km/h (49 mph, 43 kn) clean
- Never exceed speed: 250 km/h (155 mph, 135 kn) at max t/o weight
- Range: 700 km (430 mi, 380 nmi) to 900 km (490 nmi; 560 mi)
- Service ceiling: 5,000 m (16,000 ft)
- g limits: +6 -3
- Maximum glide ratio: 20
- Rate of climb: 3.29 m/s (648 ft/min) max
- Rate of sink: 1.4 m/s (280 ft/min) power off
- Wing loading: 42.99 kg/m^{2} (8.81 lb/sq ft) at max t/o weight

== See also ==
Aircraft of comparable role, configuration, and era

- Scheibe Tandem-Falke

Related lists

- List of motor gliders
