= List of aircraft manufacturers (A) =

This is a list of aircraft manufacturers sorted alphabetically by International Civil Aviation Organization (ICAO)/common name. It contains the ICAO/common name, manufacturers name(s), country and other data, with the known years of operation in parentheses.

The ICAO names are listed in bold. Having an ICAO name does not mean that a manufacturer is still in operation today, just that some of the aircraft produced by that manufacturer are still flying.

== 0—9 ==
- 3Xtrim Aircraft Factory (Zaklady Lotnicze) (Poland) – From Wytwórnia i Naprawa Konstrukcji Lekkich 1999, currently operational

== A ==
- Aachen Flugzeugbau (Germany) – founded 1914, renamed Aachener Segelflugzeugbau in 1921
- Abrams Air Craft Corporation (US), formed 1937, defunct 1940
- ABS Aerolight, Sérignan-du-Comtat, France
- **ABS**, ABS Aircraft – Germany, (1985–?)
- **ABS**, ABS Aircraft AG – Switzerland, (1985–?)
- AC Mobil 34, AC Mobil 34 – France
- ACAZ – Ateliers de Construction Aéronautique de Zeebruges, Belgium
- **ACBA**, Aéro Club de Bas Armagnac – France
- **Ace**, Ace Aircraft Manufacturing and Supply – United States
- **Ace**, Ace Aircraft Manufacturing Company – United States, (1929–1931) > Corben Aircraft Company
- **Ace**, Ace Aircraft Manufacturing Inc – United States
- **Aceair**, Aceair SA – Switzerland, (1999–2005)
- **Aces High**, Aces High Light Aircraft Ltd – Canada
- Advance Thun, Thun, Switzerland
- ACS, Advanced Composites Solutions – United States (2006–present)
- ACME, Air Craft Marine Engineering – United States, (1954–?)
- **Airdale Sportplane and Supply**, Rhinelander, Wisconsin, United States, (1999–2017)
- Airo Aviation, Ras Al Khaimah Free Trade Zone, United Arab Emirates, (2006–2019)
- Acme, Acme Aircraft Corp – United States, (1929–?)
- **Acro Sport**, Acro Sport Inc – United States, (?-present)
- **AD Aerospace**, AD Aerospace Ltd – United Kingdom
- Aero East Europe, Kraljevo, Serbia
- **ADA**, Aeronautical Development Agency – India, (1984–present)
- Aero Nord, Lorgies, and later Bénifontaine, France
- **Adam (1)**, Roger Adam – France, (1948–1955)
- **Adam (2)**, Adam Aircraft Industries LLC – United States, (1998, defunct 2008) (AAI)
- Adamoli-Cattani, Adamoli-Cattani – Italy
- Adams Aero, Adams Aeronautics Company, Inc – United States
- Adams-Wilson, Adams-Wilson Helicopters Inc – United States
- Adaro, Adaro – Spain
- ADC Aircraft, Aircraft Disposals Company – United Kingdom, (1920–1930)
- Adcox, Adcox Aviation Trade School – United States
- Adkisson, Earl and Jerry Adkisson – United States
- Ader, Clement, France, (1886–1897)
- Adler, Adler (Adlerwerke vorm Heinrich Kleyer) – Germany, (1934–?)
- Admiralty, British Admiralty Air Department – United Kingdom, (AD)
- Advanced Aerodynamics and Structures, Inc. (AASI) (US) – founded 1989, renamed to Mooney Aerospace Group in 2002
- **Advanced Aeromarine**, Advanced Aeromarine – United States, > Keuthan Aircraft
- Advanced Aircraft Corporation (AAC) – United States
- Advanced Amphibious Aircraft (AAA) – Germany/Italy, (1988–1994)
- **Advanced Aviation**, Advanced Aviation Inc – United States
- Advanced Soaring Concepts, Advanced Soaring Concepts – United States
- **Adventure Air**, Adventure Air – United States
- Adventure SA, Méré, Yonne, France
- AD-Y, Antonov Dnipropetrovsk-Pivdenmash – Ukraine
- **AEA**, Aeronautical Engineers Australia Research Pty Ltd – Australia, (1978–present)
- AEA, Aerial Experiment Association – Canada, (1907–1909) > Curtiss Aeroplane and Motor Company
- AEC, Aircraft Engineering Corp – United States
- AEG, Allgemeine Elektrizitäts-Gesellschaft – Germany, (1910–1918) (General Electricity Company)
- AEKKEA-RAAB, AEKKEA – Greece (1935–1940)
- AER, Aer Aircraft Corp. – United States
- Aer Lualdi, Aer Lualdi & C SpA – Italy
- Aer Pegaso, Aer Pegaso – Argentina
- Aerauto, Aerauto – Italy, (1950–1953)
- Aereon, Aereon – United States, (1967–?)
- **Aerfer**, Aerfer-Industrie Aerospaziali Meridionali SpA – Italy, (1955–1969) > Aeritalia
- **Aerfer**, Aerfer-Industrie Meccaniche Aeronautiche Meridionali SpA – Italy
- **Aerfer-Aermacchi**, see AERFER and AERMACCHI – Italy
- Aerial Distributors, Aerial Distributors – United States, (1967–?)
- Aerial Service Corporation, Aerial Service Corporation – United States, (1920–?) > Mercury Aircraft
- Aériane, Aériane – Belgium
- **Aeritalia**, Aeritalia-Società Aerospaziale Italiana pA – Italy, (1969–1981) > Alenia Aeronautica
- **Aeritalia-Aermacchi**, see AERITALIA and AERMACCHI – Italy
- **Aermacchi**, Aermacchi SpA – Italy, (1913–present)
- **Aermatica Spa**, Italy, (2008–present)
- 'Aermacchi, Aeronautica Macchi SpA – Italy
- **Aero (1)**, Aero Design and Engineering Company – United States, (1944–1960) > Rockwell
- **Aero (2)**, Aero Vodochody AS – Czech Republic, (1994–present)
- **Aero (2)**, Aero Vodochody Národní Podnik – Czechoslovakia/Czech Republic, (1919–1994)
- **Aero (3)**, Aero Sp z oo – Poland
- **Aero Adventure**, Aero Adventure Inc – United States
- A.E.R.O. Aircraft Services, LLC, United States – manufacturer of Lake amphibian aircraft
- **Aero Boero**, Aero Boero SA – Argentina, (1952–present)
- **Aero Boero**, Aero Boero SRL – Argentina
- **Aero Boero**, Aero Talleres Boero SRL – Argentina
- **Aero Bravo**, Aerobravo Industria Aeronautica Ltda – Brazil, (1993–present)
- **Aero Commander**, Aero Commander Inc – United States
- Aero Composites, Aero Composites – United States
- **Aero Designs**, Aero Designs Inc – United States
- Aerodyne Technologies, Talloires, France
- **Aero Jaen**, Aeronautica de Jaen – Spain
- **Aero Kuhlmann**, Aero Kuhlmann – France
- **Aero Mercantil**, Aero Mercantil SA – Colombia
- **Aero Mirage**, Aero Mirage Inc – United States
- **Aero Mod**, Aero Mod General – United States
- Aero Resources – US
- **Aero Spacelines**, Aero Spacelines Inc – United States, (1961–1974) > Tracor
- **AeroCad**, AeroCad Inc – United States
- Aero-Cam, Aero-Cam Pty Ltd – (South Africa)
- **Aerocar**, Aerocar Inc – United States
- Aerocar International, Aerocar International – United States, (1945–1961)
- Aérocentre, Société Nationale de Constructions Aéronautiques du Centre – France, (SNCAC)
- Aerochute International, Coburg North, Victoria, Australia
- Aero-Club, Aero-Club der Schweiz – Switzerland
- **Aerocomp**, Aerocomp Inc – United States
- **Aero-Composites**, Aero-Composites Technologies Inc – United States
- Aero-Craft, Aero-Craft – Unknown
- **Aero-Difusión**, Aero-Difusión SL – Spain (1955– )
- **Aérodis**, Aérodis SARL – France
- Aero-Flight, Aero-Flight – United States
- Aerion Corporation – United States
- **Aero-Jodel**, Aero Flugzeugbau Hubert Zuerl – Germany
- **Aerokopter**, OOO Aerokopter – Ukraine
- **AeroLites**, Aerolites Inc – United States
- Aeromarine, Aeromarine Plane and Motor Co. – United States, (1908–1935) (Prior to 1914 was the Boland Aeroplane and Motor Co.) > Burnelli
- Aeromarine-LSA, South Lakeland Airport, Florida, United States
- **Aeromere**, Aeromere SpA – Italy
- **Aeromot**, Aeromot Industria Mecanico-Metalurgica Ltda – Brazil
- **Aeromot**, Aeronaves e Motores SA – Brazil
- Aeronautica Agrícola Mexicana SA (AAMSA) (Mexico) – founded 1971, dissolved 1984
- Aeronautical Engineering Co., Aeronautical Engineering Co. – United States
- Aeroneering – United States
- **Aeronca**, Aeronautical Corporation of America – United States, (1928–1951)
- **Aeronca**, Aeronca Manufacturing Corporation – United States
- **Aeroplastika**, Aeroplastika – Lithuania
- **Aeropract**, Aeropract JSC – Russia
- **Aeropract**, KB Aeropract – Russia
- **Aeropract**, LM Aeropract Samara – Russia
- **Aeropract**, OKB Aeroprakt – Russia
- **Aeropract**, Aeroprakt Firma – Ukraine
- **Aeropract**, Aeroprakt ooo – Ukraine
- **Aeropro**, Aeropro sro – Slovakia
- Aeroprogress, Aeroprogress Corporation – Russia
- Aeroric, Aeroric Nauchno-Proizvodstvennoye Predpriyatie OOO – Russia
- Aero-Service Jacek Skopiński, Warsaw, Poland
- AEROSPACE MANUFACTURING Inc United States
- Aeros, Aeros – Ukraine
- Aerospace General – (US)
- Aérospatiale, Société Nationale Industrielle Aerospatiale – France, (1970–1999) (SONACA) > Aérospatiale-Matra
- Aérospatiale-Matra, Aérospatiale-Matra – France, (1999–2000) > EADS
- Aerospool, Aerospool spol sro – Slovakia
- Aerosport, Aerosport Inc – United States
- Aerosport OY, Keila, Estonia
- Aerostar, SC Aerostar SA – Romania
- **Aerostar Aircraft**, Aerostar Aircraft Corporation – United States
- **Aérostructure**, Aérostructure SARL – France
- Aerosud, Aerosud – (South Africa)
- Aerotaller, Aerotaller – Argentina
- **Aerotec**, Aerotec SA Industria Aeronáutica – Brazil, (1962–1987)
- **Aerotechnik**, Aerotechnik CZ SRO – Czech Republic
- Aerotécnica – Spain
- **Aerotek (1)**, Aerotek Inc – United States
- **Aerotek (2)**, Aeronautical Systems Technology – (South Africa)
- **Aero-Volga**, NPO Aero-Volga – Russia
- **Aesl**, Aero Engine Services Ltd – New Zealand
- **AFIC**, AFIC Pty Ltd – (South Africa)
- AFU – Switzerland
- **Ag-Cat**, Ag-Cat Corporation – United States
- AGO Flugzeugwerke, Ago Flugzeugwerke – Germany
- **Agro-Copteros**, Agro-Copteros Ltda – Colombia
- **Agrolot**, Fundacja Agrolot – Poland
- **Agrolot**, Wyposazen Agrolotniczych – Poland
- **Agusta**, Agusta SpA – Italy, (1907–present)
- **Agusta**, Agusta, Division of Leonardo – Italy
- **Agusta**, Costruzioni Aeronautiche Giovanni Agusta SpA – Italy
- Ahrens, Ahrens Aircraft Corp. – United States (1975–?)
- AI(R), Aero International (Regional) – UK/France/Italy
- AIAA, Atelier Industriel de l'Aéronautique d'Alger – Algeria, (1948–1960)
- Aichi Kokuki, Aichi Kokuki KK – Japan, (1931–1945) (Aichi Aircraft Company)
- AICSA, Aero Industrial Colombiana SA – Colombia
- AIDC, Aero Industry Development Center – Taiwan
- AIDC, Aerospace Industrial Development Corporation – Taiwan
- AIEP, Aeronautical Industrial Engineering and Project Management Company Ltd – Nigeria
- AII, Aviation Industries of Iran – Iran, (1993–present)
- AIL, Aeronautics (India) Ltd – India
- **AIR**, Aircraft Investor Resources LLC – United States
- **Air & Space**, Air & Space America Inc – United States
- **Air & Space**, Air & Space Manufacturing Inc – United States
- **Air Command**, Air Command International Inc – United States
- **Air Parts**, Air Parts (NZ) Ltd – New Zealand
- **Air Products**, Air Products Company Inc – United States
- **Air Tractor**, Air Tractor Inc – United States, (1972–present)
- Airbridge – Moscow, Russia
- **Airbus**, Airbus SAS – European Union, (1970–present)
- **Airbus**, GIE Airbus Industrie – European Union
- Airco, Aircraft Manufacturing Company – United Kingdom, (1912–1920) > de Havilland
- **Airconcept**, Airconcept Flugzeug und Gerätebau GmbH und Co KG – Germany
- Aircraft Armaments Incorporated (AAI) (US) – founded 1950, renamed to AAI Corporation 1985
- Aircraft Cooperative, Aircraft Cooperative – United States
- **Aircraft Designs**, Aircraft Designs Inc – United States, (1986–present) (ADI)
- **Aircraft Hydro-Forming**, Aircraft Hydro-Forming Inc – United States
- **Aircraft Parts**, Aircraft Parts and Development Corporation – United States
- **Aircraft Spruce & Specialty Co**, Aircraft Spruce & Specialty Company – United States
- **Aircraft Technologies**, Aircraft Technologies Inc – United States
- Airfer, (Airfer Paramotores, Paramotores Air-Future, S.L.), Pontevedra, Spain
- **Air-Fouga**, Air-Fouga – France
- Airframes Unlimited, Athens, Texas, United States
- **AirLony Aircraft Company** – Czech Republic
- Airmak, Capua, Italy
- **Airmaster**, Airmaster Inc – United States
- **Airplane Factory, The**, Tedderfield Airpark, Eikenhof, Johannesburg South, South Africa
- Air Plum, Fourilles, France
- Airspeed, Airspeed Ltd – United Kingdom, (1931–1951) > de Havilland
- Air-Sport, Zakopane, Poland
- **Airsport sro**, Zbraslavice, Czech Republic
- Air Sylphe, Villereau, Nord, France
- **Airtech (1)**, Airtech Canada Aviation Services Ltd – Canada
- **Airtech (2)**, Aircraft Technology Industries – Indonesia/Spain
- Airtime Products, Airlie Beach, Queensland, Australia
- Airwave Gliders, Fulpmes, Austria
- Airways International, United States
- **AISA**, Aeronautica Industrial SA – Spain
- **AJEP**, AJEP Developments – United Kingdom
- **AJI**, American Jet Industries Inc – United States
- **Akaflieg Berlin**, Akademische Fliegergruppe Berlin eV – Germany
- Akaflieg Braunschweig, Akaflieg Braunschweig – Germany
- **Akaflieg Darmstadt**, Akademische Fliegergruppe Darmstadt eV – Germany
- Akaflieg Hannover, Akaflieg Hannover – Germany
- **Akaflieg Karlsruhe**, Akademische Fliegergruppe Karlsruhe eV – Germany
- **Akaflieg Munchen**, Akademische Fliegergruppe München eV – Germany
- Akaflieg Stuttgart, Akaflieg Stuttgart – Germany
- **Akron**, Akron Aircraft Company Inc – United States
- **Akrotech**, Akrotech Aviation Inc – United States
- **Akrotech Europe**, Akrotech Europe SA – France
- **Alanne**, Pentti Alanne – Finland
- Alaparma – Italy
- **Albastar Ltd**, Zgornje Gorje, Slovenia
- Albatros, Fabrika aviona Albatros – Yugoslavia
- Albatros Flugzeugwerke, Albatros Flugzeugwerke – Germany, (1910–1931) > Focke-Wulf
- Albatros-Flugzeugwerke, Ostdeutsche Albatros Werke – Germany, (East German Albatros Works)
- Albaviation, Corropoli, Italy
- **Alenia**, Alenia – Italy, (1981–present)
- **Alenia**, Alenia Aerospazio, Division of Leonardo – Italy
- Alexander Aircraft Company, Englewood/Colorado Springs, Colorado – United States (1926–1932)
- **Alfa-M**, Alfa-M Nauchno-Proizvodstvennoye Predpriyatie AOOT – Russia
- Alisport, Alisport – Italy
- All American – US
- Alliance Aeroplane Company, Alliance Aeroplane Company Ltd, United Kingdom
- Alliant Aviation, Richland, Michigan, United States
- Alliant Techsystems, Alliant Techsystems – United States
- Allied Aerospace Industries – United States, (?-present)
- Allied Aviation – United States
- **Allison**, Allison Gas Turbine Division GMC – United States
- **Alon**, Alon Inc – United States, (1964–1967) > Mooney
- **Alpavia**, Alpavia SA – France, (1959–1966) > Sportavia-Putzer
- **Alpavia**, Société Alpavia – France
- **Alpha**, Alpha – Poland
- **Alpi**, Alpi Aviation Srl – Italy
- **Alpla**, Alpla-Werke Alwin Lechner OHG – Austria
- **Altair Coelho**, Eldorado do Sul, Brazil
- AltiGator (2008–present), Amphios SPRL - Belgium
- **Alturair**, Alturair – United States
- **Alvarez**, Joseph P. Alvarez – United States
- **Amax**, Amax Engineering – Australia
- **Ambrosini**, Societa Aeronautica Italiana Ing. A. Ambrosini & Companie – Italy, (1934–1958)
- **Amc**, Aircraft Manufacturing Company – United States, (1917–1920)
- **Amd**, Aircraft Manufacturing and Development Company Inc – United States
- **Ameagle**, AmEagle Corporation – United States
- **American Aerolights**, United States
- **American**, American Aviation Corporation – United States
- **American Affordable**, American Affordable Aircraft – United States, (AAA)
- **American Aircraft**, American Aircraft Inc – United States
- American Airmotive – United States
- Ameri-Cana Ultralights – Canada
- **American Autogyro**, American Autogyro Inc – United States
- **American Champion**, American Champion Aircraft Corporation – United States
- **American Eagle**, American Eagle Aircraft Corporation – United States
- **American General**, American General Aircraft Company – United States
- **American Homebuilts**, Hebron, Illinois, United States
- **American Sportscopter**, American Sportscopter Inc – United States
- **American Utilicraft**, American Utilicraft Corporation – United States
- Ameur Aviation SA (or simply "Ameur") – France
- Ameur Aviation Technologie (or simply "Ameur") – France
- Amiot, Amiot – France, (1915–1945) (Amiot-Peneau) > Ateliers Aeronautiques de Colombes, SNCAC
- Amoy, Amoy – Unknown, (1930–1935)
- Amphibian Airplanes of Canada (AAC) – Canada, (1998–?)
- **AMS-Flight**, AMS-Flight DOO – Slovenia
- **AMX**, AMX International Ltd – Italy/Brazil
- **Anahuac**, Fabrica de Aviones Anahuac SA – Mexico
- Anatra – Russia
- ANBO – Antanas Gustaitis at the Lithuanian Army Aviation Workshops – Lithuania
- **Anderson**, Anderson Aircraft Corporation – United States
- **Anderson**, Earl Anderson – United States
- **Anderson-Greenwood**, Anderson, Greenwood and Company – United States
- **Andreasson**, Björn Andreasson – Sweden
- ANF Mureaux, ANF Mureaux – France, (1918–1937) > SNCAN
- **Angel**, Angel Aircraft Corporation – United States
- **Anglin**, Anglin Engineering – United States
- **Anglin**, Anglin Special Aero Planes Inc – United States
- Anglo Normandy, Anglo Normandy Aero Engineering – United Kingdom
- ANG PATRIOT UKRAINE LLC, Brovary, Kyiv region, Ukraine (angpatriotua . com)
- Ansaldo – Italy, (1916–1928)
- Antoinette, Antoinette – France, (1906–1912)
- **Antoniewski**, Tomek Antoniewski – Poland
- **Antonov**, Antonov OKB – Ukraine, (1947–present)
- **Antonov** Company (before 2010 Aviatsijnyy Naukovo-Tekhnichnyy Kompleks Imeni O.K. Antonova) – Ukraine
- **AOI**, Arab Organisation for Industrialisation, Aircraft Factory – (Egypt)
- Apco Aviation, Caesarea, Israel
- Apex Aircraft – France
- **Apollo Ultralight Aircraft**, Eger, Hungary
- **Applebay Sailplanes**, Albuquerque, New Mexico, United States
- **Applegate & Weyant**, Applegate & Weyant – United States
- **Aquila**, Aquila Technische Entwicklungen GmbH – Germany
- Arab British Helicopter Company (ABHCO) (Egypt)
- **Arado**, Arado Flugzeugwerke GmbH – Germany, (1925–1945)
- **Arc Atlantique**, Arc Atlantique Aviation – France
- **Arctic**, Arctic Aircraft Company – United States
- Arey, Krasnoyarsk, Russia
- **ARDC**, Air Force Research and Development Center – Philippines
- Arkhangelski, Arkhangelski OKB – Russia
- Armstrong Siddeley, Armstrong Siddeley – United Kingdom, Possibly engine maker
- **Armstrong Whitworth**, Sir W. G. Armstrong Whitworth Aircraft Ltd – United Kingdom, (1913–1958) > Hawker Siddeley
- **Arnet Pereyra**, Arnet Pereyra Aero Design – United States
- Arocet – United States
- Arpin, M. B. Arpin & Co. – United Kingdom
- **Arrow (1)**, Arrow Airplane & Motors Corporation – United States
- **Arrow (2)**, Arrow Aircraft Company – Canada
- Arrow Aircraft, Arrow Airplane Company – United States, (1931–1935)
- Arrow Aircraft Ltd. – United Kingdom
- Arsenal de l'Aeronautique, Arsenal de l'Aeronautique – France, (1936–1953) > SFECMAS
- **ARV**, ARV Aviation Ltd – United Kingdom
- **ASAP**, Aircraft Sales & Parts – Canada
- ASJA – Sweden
- **ASL**, ASL Hagfors Aero AB – Sweden
- **Asso Aerei**, Asso Aerei Srl – Italy
- **Associated Air**, Associated Air – United States
- **ASTA**, Aerospace Technologies of Australia Pty Ltd – Australia, (1987–present)
- Astra, Astra Societe de Constructions Aeronautiques – France, (1909–1921) > Nieuport
- ATB, First Naval Air Technical Bureau (abbreviated Kugisho) – Japan, (1969–1996) > Aeronautical Development Agency
- **ATEC v.o.s.**, Libice nad Cidlinou, Czech Republic
- Ateliers Aeronautiques de Colombes, Ateliers Aeronautiques de Colombes – France, −1945
- Ateliers Aéronautiques de Suresnes (AAS) (France) – founded 1945, now defunct
- Ateliers, Ateliers de Construction Aéronautique de Zeebrugge – Belgium, (1923–1933) (ACAZ) (Zeebrugge Aeronautical Construction Company) (ZACCO)
- Atlantic-Fokker, Atlantic Fokker Corporation (American Fokker) – United States
- Atlas, Atlas Aircraft Company – US (1948)
- **Atlas**, Atlas Aircraft Corporation of South Africa (Pty) Ltd – (South Africa), (1965–present)
- **Atlas**, Atlas Aviation (Pty) Ltd – (South Africa)
- **Atlas**, Atlas Aviation, Division of Denel (Pty) Ltd – (South Africa)
- **ATR**, GIE Avions de Transport Régional – France/Italy, (1981–present)
- Aubert, Aubert Aviation – France, (1932–1940, 1945–1959)
- Aurora Flight Sciences, Aurora Flight Sciences Corp. – United States (1989–present)
- Aurore Sarl, Sauvagnon, France
- Auster, Auster Aircraft Ltd – United Kingdom, (1946–1961)
- **Austflight**, Austflight ULA Pty Ltd – Australia
- Austin Motors, Austin Motors Ltd. – United Kingdom
- Australian Aircraft & Engineering, Australian Aircraft & Engineering – Australia, (1910–1923)
- Australian Aircraft Consortium, Australian Aircraft Consortium – Australia, (1982–1985) (A joint venture between the Government Aircraft Factories, the Commonwealth Aircraft Corporation and Hawker de Havilland.) > Hawker de Havilland
- **Australian Aircraft Kits**, Taree, New South Wales, Australia
- Australian Autogyro – Australia (1984–?)
- **Australite**, Australite Inc – United States
- Auto-Aero, Auto-Aero – Hungary
- AutoGyro GmbH, Hildesheim, Germany
- Av8er Limited, Woodford Halse, Northamptonshire, United Kingdom
- **Avcraft**, AvCraft Aviation LLC – United States
- AVE, Advanced Vehicle Engineers – United States, (1971–1973)
- **Avia (1)**, Azionari Vercellese Industrie Aeronautiche – Italy
- **Avia (2)**, Avia-Zavody Jirího Dimitrova – Czechoslovakia, (1919–1958)
- **Avia (3)**, Nauchno-Proizvodstvennoe Obedinenie Avia – Russia
- **Avia Baltika**, Avia Baltika Aviation Ltd – Lithuania
- **Aviabellanca**, AviaBellanca Aircraft Corporation – United States, (1983–present)
- Aviafiber – Switzerland
- **Aviamilano**, Aviamilano Costruzioni Aeronautiche SRL – Italy, (1959–?)
- **Aviastroitel**, AviaStroitel Ltd – Russia
- **Aviat**, Aviat Aircraft Inc – United States
- **Aviat**, Aviat Inc – United States
- Aviatik, Österreichische-Ungarische Flugzeugfabrik Aviatik – Austria, (1910–1918) (Automobil und Aviatik)
- **Aviatika**, Aviatika JSC – Russia
- **Aviatika**, Kontsern Aviatika – Russia
- **Aviation**, Aviaton Nauchno-Proizvodstvennaya Aviatsionnaya Firma – Russia
- Aviation Association Ilyushin (Russia) – Formed 1992
- Aviation Composite Technology, Aviation Composite Technology – Philippines, (1990–?) (ACT)
- **Aviation Development**, Aviation Development International Ltd – United States
- **Aviation Farm**, Aviation Farm Ltd – Poland
- Aviation Industries of Iran, Iran
- Aviation Normand Dube, Sainte-Anne-des-Plaines, Quebec, Canada
- **Aviation Scotland**, Aviation Scotland Ltd – United Kingdom
- **Aviation Traders**, Aviation Traders (Engineering) Ltd – United Kingdom, (1949–1962)
- Avibras, Avribras Aeroespacial SA – Brazil, (1963–1967) (Aviation Brazil)
- **Avid**, Avid Aircraft Inc – United States
- **Avioane Craiova**, SC Avioane Craiova SA – Romania
- **Aviones de Colombia**, Aviones de Colombia SA – Colombia
- **Avions Fairey**, Avions Fairey SA – Belgium, (1931–1978) > Aêrospatiale
- **Avions Fairey**, Fairey SA – Belgium
- Avions JDM – France
- **Aviotechnica**, Aviotechnica Ltd – Bulgaria/Russia
- **Avipro**, AviPro Aircraft Ltd – United States
- AVIS, AVIS Aircraft – Unknown, (1917–1923) -1941
- **Avro**, A. V. Roe & Company – United Kingdom, (1910–1963) > Hawker Siddeley
- **Avro**, A. V. Roe & Company Ltd – United Kingdom
- **Avro**, Avro International Aerospace Ltd – United Kingdom
- Avro Canada, Avro Aircraft Canada – Canada, (1945–1962) > Hawker Siddeley
- **Avtek**, Avtek Corporation – United States
- **Ayres**, Ayres Corporation – United States, (?-2001) > Thrush Aircraft
- Azalea Aviation, Adel, Georgia, United States

== See also ==
- Aircraft
- List of aircraft engine manufacturers
- List of aircraft manufacturers
