= Aerosport =

Aerosport may refer to:

- Aerosport Inc, company founded in 1971 to market aircraft for homebuilding
- Aerosport (air show), air show created in 1993 in Igualada, Spain
- Aerosport OY, an Estonian aircraft manufacturer, based in Keila
- Aerosport Quail
- Aerosport Rail
- Aerosport Scamp
- Aerosport Woody Pusher
