= AAC =

AAC may refer to:

== Aviation ==
- Advanced Aircraft, a company from Carlsbad, California, US
- Airborne aircraft carrier, a type of aircraft
- Alaskan Air Command, a radar network
- American Aeronautical Corporation, a company from Port Washington, New York, US
- American Aviation, a company from Cleveland, Ohio, US
- Amphibian Airplanes of Canada, a company from Squamish, British Columbia, Canada
- Civil Aviation Authority (El Salvador) (Autoridad de Aviación Civil)
- Civil Aviation Authority (Panama) (Autoridad Aeronáutica Civil)
- El Arish International Airport in North Sinai Governorate, Egypt (IATA airport code AAC)

== Biology and Medicine ==
- Anesthesiologist assistant (sometimes abbreviated AA-C), an assistant to an anesthesiologist
- Augmentative and alternative communication, a class of communications methods for people with speech impairments
- Pseudomembranous colitis, also known as antibiotic associated colitis, a medical complication
- AAC, a codon for the amino acid asparagine
- Adenine nucleotide translocator (ANT), also known as the ADP/ATP carrier protein (AAC)

== Education ==
- Anthony Abell College, a secondary school in Brunei
- Art Academy of Cincinnati, a private college in Cincinnati, Ohio, US
- Association of American Colleges known today as the American Association of Colleges and Universities
- Coimbra Academic Association, a Portuguese students' union
- Antimicrobial Agents and Chemotherapy, an academic journal

== Military ==
- Advanced Armament Corporation, manufacturer of sound suppressors
- AAC Honey Badger, assault rifle
- United States Army Acquisition Corps
- United States Army Air Corps, a former component of the US Army
- Army Apprentices College, a former UK college
- Army Air Corps (United Kingdom), a component of the British Army
- Australian Air Corps, immediate predecessor of the Royal Australian Air force
- Australian Army Cadets, a youth organisation

== Organizations ==
- Adult Association of Canada, a coalition of strip club owners and their agents
- Affirming Anglican Catholicism, a religious movement
- Alameda Arts Council
- American Anglican Council, a religious organization
- Australian Agricultural Company, a company
- Australian Aluminium Council, an industry association
- Awami Action Committee, political organisation in Pakistan
- Armenian Apostolic Church, the national church of Armenia
- Austin Animal Center, the animal shelter of Austin, Texas

== Sports ==
- American Airlines Center, a multipurpose arena in Dallas, Texas, US
- American Alpine Club, a climbing organization
- Appalachian Athletic Conference, an NAIA college athletics conference in the US
- American Conference (NCAA) (formerly known as the American Athletic Conference), a collegiate athletic conference in the US
- Western North Carolina Athletic Conference, a high school organization known as the Appalachian Athletic Conference until 2009
- Asia-Pacific Amateur Championship, formerly Asian Amateur Championship, an APGC golf tournament
- Associação Académica de Coimbra – O.A.F., a Portuguese football organization
- Associação Académica de Coimbra – basketball, a Portuguese basketball club
- Associação Académica de Coimbra – volleyball, a Portuguese volleyball club
- Associação Académica de Coimbra, the students' union of the University of Coimbra, which sponsors other sports, including rugby
- Association of Alabama Camps, a youth camp organization
- Atlanta Athletic Club, a private athletic club in Duluth, Georgia, US
- Audax Alpine Classic, a bicycle event in Victoria, Australia

== Technology ==
- Advanced Audio Coding, an audio compression format
- Air arc cutting, a gouging process for metals
- Auto Avio Costruzioni 815, a car by Ferrari
- Autoclaved aerated concrete, a building material
- Photochrom, also known as the Aäc process

== Other uses ==
- Anne Arundel County, Maryland, US
- Ari language (New Guinea), coded aac in ISO 639-3
