= Pelzner Hang Glider =

German single-seat glider, 1920

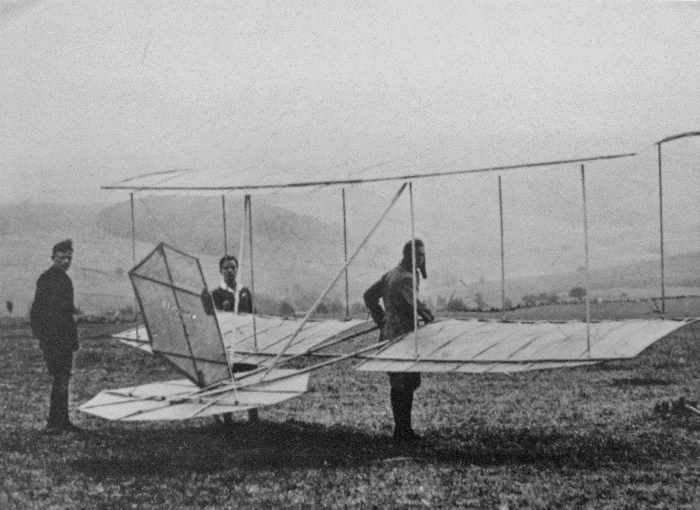
- Willi Pelzner, ready for launch with his hang glider (c.1920). Wassserkuppe/Rhön, Germany.

General information
- Type: Glider
- National origin: Germany
- Manufacturer: Willy Pelzner
- Number built: 1

History
- First flight: 1920

The Pelzner Hang Glider was a simple, lightweight, low cost but strong hang glider built in Germany in 1920, intended to make flying accessible to large numbers of young people. Variants competed with some success in the first two Rhön contests held on the Wasserkuppe.

== Development ==
Willy Pelzner's gliders were designed to be simple and cheap to build and maintain, in order to encourage young people to engage in aviation. They were very light, unequal span biplane hang gliders with a strong wire and cane braced lightweight structure, covered in oiled paper. Fixed tail surfaces at the rear provided stability but control relied on adjustment of the centre of gravity by movement of the pilot's body. Pelzner flew his gliders in the first two Rhön meetings in 1920 and 1921.

== Operational history ==
For much of the 1920 meeting, Pelzner led the small field with a 52 s, 452 m (1,480 ft) flight and, over 16 flights, a total distance of 2,278 m (7,470 ft). However, towards the close of the contest Wolfgang Klemperer flew the FVA-1 Schwatze Düvel, designed and built by the students' club of the University of Aachen, the FVA (Flugwissenschaftliche Vereinigung Aachen, (English: Flight Research Association Aachen)) on a 142 s flight over 1,830 m (6,000 ft). With two more good flights Klemperer won first prize with Pelzner second.

In the 1921 contest Pelzner flew his new hang glider (57 flights) and another biplane glider from the North Bavarian Aviation Society (5 flights) to claim first prize in the category for the longest total flight time (36 m 40 s) by one pilot. He beat the Loessl Sb.1 Münchener flown by Karl Koller by making more than twice as many flights, even though his average individual flight time (35.5 s) was much less. The Münchener won the other two prizes awarded. Only after the contest did the Aachen FVA-2 Blaue Maus and particularly the Hannover Vampyr show their superiority, though the Vampyr did receive a special prize.

== Specifications ==
Data from Deutsches Museum

General characteristics

- Crew: One
- Upper wingspan: 5.40 m (17 ft 9 in)
- Wing area: 14 m^{2} (150 sq ft)
- Empty weight: 10 kg (22 lb)
- Wing loading: 6.4 kg/m^{2} (1.3 lb/sqft))

Performance

- Maximum glide ratio: 1:6
