= FVA-3 Ente =

German two-seat glider, 1922

General information
- Type: glider
- National origin: Germany
- Manufacturer: Flugwissenschaftliche Vereinigung Aachen
- Designer: Wolfgang Klemperer
- Number built: 1

History
- First flight: 1922

The FVA-3 Ente was a canard two-seat glider built in Germany in 1922.

== Development ==
After the relative success of the FVA-1 Schwatze Düvel and FVA-2 Blaue Maus, Wolfgang Klemperer designed and built the canard FVA-3 Ente. Using similar construction methods to the earlier gliders, Klemperer built the FVA-3 from wood with fabric covering, the thick cantilevered mainplane supporting a wide fuselage, extending forwards from the centre section, enclosing the side-by side cockpit forward of the mainplane and supporting the forward plane which was mounted on spherical bearings to provide control in pitch and yaw. On the ground the FVA-3 was supported by two fixed skids faired by large trousers similar to the FVA-1 and FVA-2.

The control system used the foreplane and 1.2 m (3 ft 11 in) span slotted ailerons at the tips of the mainplane. Fore-and-aft movement of the stick altered the angle of attack of the whole foreplane, raising or lowering the nose. Side-to-side movement of the stick operated the mainlane ailerons in a conventional fashion to control the bank angle (i.e. stick left -left aileron up right aileron down and vice versa). The sole yaw control, as the aircraft had neither fin nor rudder, consisted of applying left or right foot-operated rudder pedal deflected small servo flaps on the trailing edge of the foreplanes to tilt the foreplanes; left plane low for the nose to yaw left and right plane low for the nose to yaw right.

Flight tests revealed a poor weight distribution, requiring the aircraft to be dismantled and the centre of gravity adjusted.

== Specifications ==
General characteristics

- Crew: 1
- Capacity: 1 passenger

Performance
