= FVA-4 Pipö =

General information
- Type: Trainer
- National origin: Germany
- Manufacturer: Flugwissenschaftliche Vereinigung Aachen
- Designer: Wolfgang Klemperer
- Number built: 1

History
- First flight: 1923

The FVA-4 Pipö was a biplane two-seat powered trainer designed and built in Germany in 1923.

== Development ==
After the relative success of the first three designs, the next aircraft to emerge from the FVA workshops was a biplane two-seater intended solely for ab initio training with new students at the FVA. Built to be easily maintained and repaired, the FVA-4 Pipö, (named after Wolfgang Klemperer's sister, “Pipö”), was a strut braced biplane constructed with wood covered with fabric. After the FVA-4 and the FVA-5 Rheinland (built simultaneously) were completed, Wolfgang Klemperer emigrated to the United States.
