= Ameur =

Ameur is a surname. Notable persons with the surname include:

- Mammar Ameur, imprisoned by the United States in the Guantanamo Bay Naval Base, Cuba
- Hameur Hizem or Ameur Hizem (born 1937), Tunisian former football manager
- Hamoud Ameur, French athlete who competed in the Men's 5000 metres at the 1960 Summer Olympics

== See also ==
- Ameur Aviation, an aircraft manufacturer
- Ameur, Morocco, a suburb of Salé in Morocco
