= APCO =

APCO may refer to:

- APCO (company), an American public relations firm
- Apco Aviation, an Israeli aircraft manufacturer
- Air Pollution Control Officer
- Association of Public-Safety Communications Officials-International, an organization providing standards for telecommunications
- APCO radiotelephony spelling alphabet, a phonetic spelling alphabet
- Project 25, a modern public safety radio standard
- APCO-16, an older telecommunications standard
- APCO Oil Corporation, a defunct Oklahoma-based petroleum business
- Apco Keara, an Israeli-made paraglider
- Apco Fiesta, a family of paragliders
- Association of Pleasure Craft Operators (UK)
- APCO - Andhra Pradesh State Handloom Weavers Cooperative Society
