= Krahe =

Krahe is a surname. Notable people with the surname include:

- Fred Krahe (1919–1981), Australian police officer and detective
- Hans Krahe (1898–1965), German philologist and linguist
- Lambert Krahe (1712-1790), German painter
- Peter Joseph Krahe (1758-1840), German architect

== See also ==
- Raab Krähe, motorglider
- VA-18 Primitiv Krähe, motorglider
- Krahës, an Albanian village and former municipality
