= AAC SeaStar =

Canadian amphibious biplane

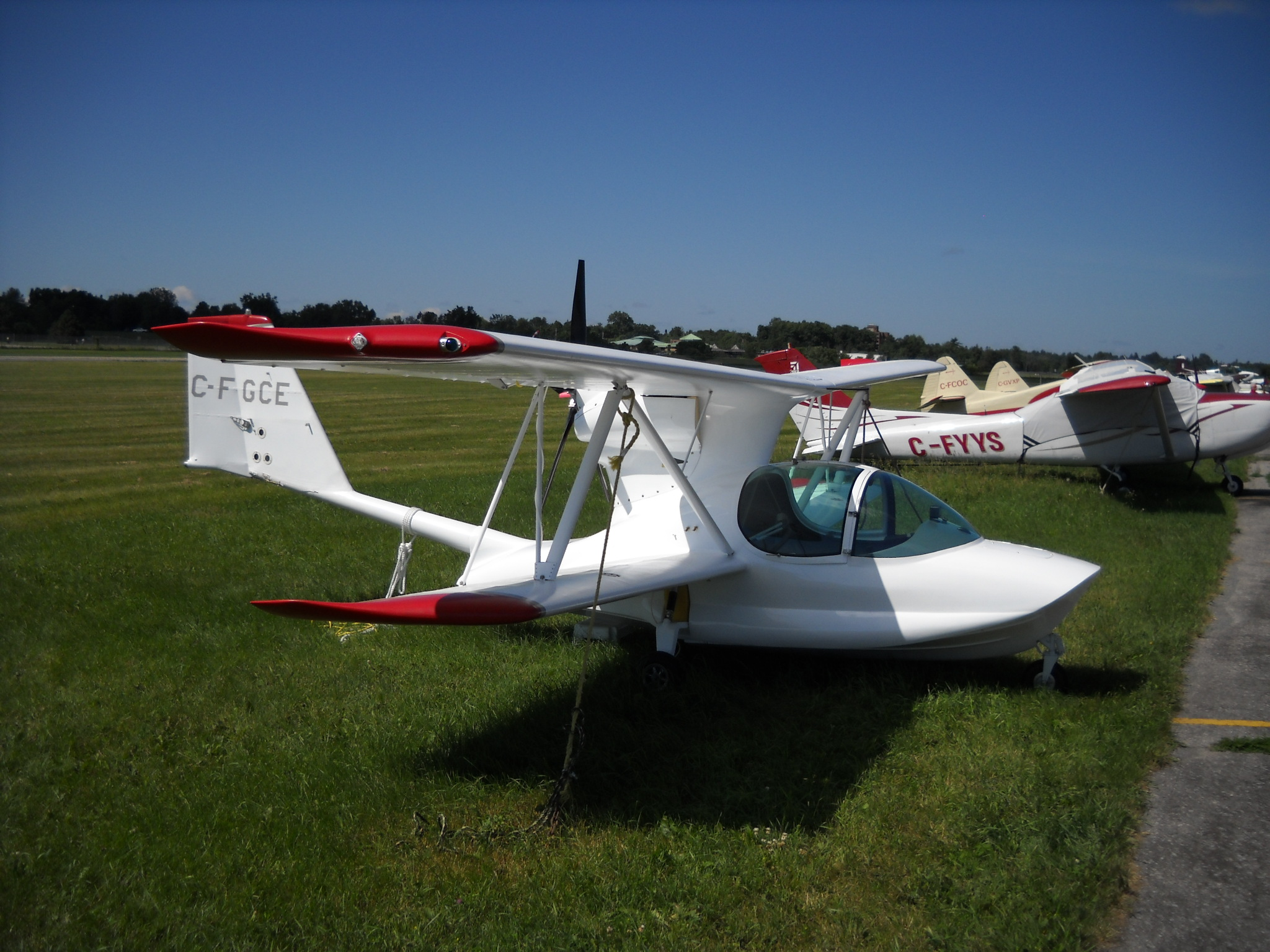

General information
- Type: Amphibious homebuilt aircraft
- Manufacturer: Amphibian Airplanes of Canada
- Status: Production completed (2012)
- Number built: 91 (2011)

History
- Variant: AAC Seastar Sealoon

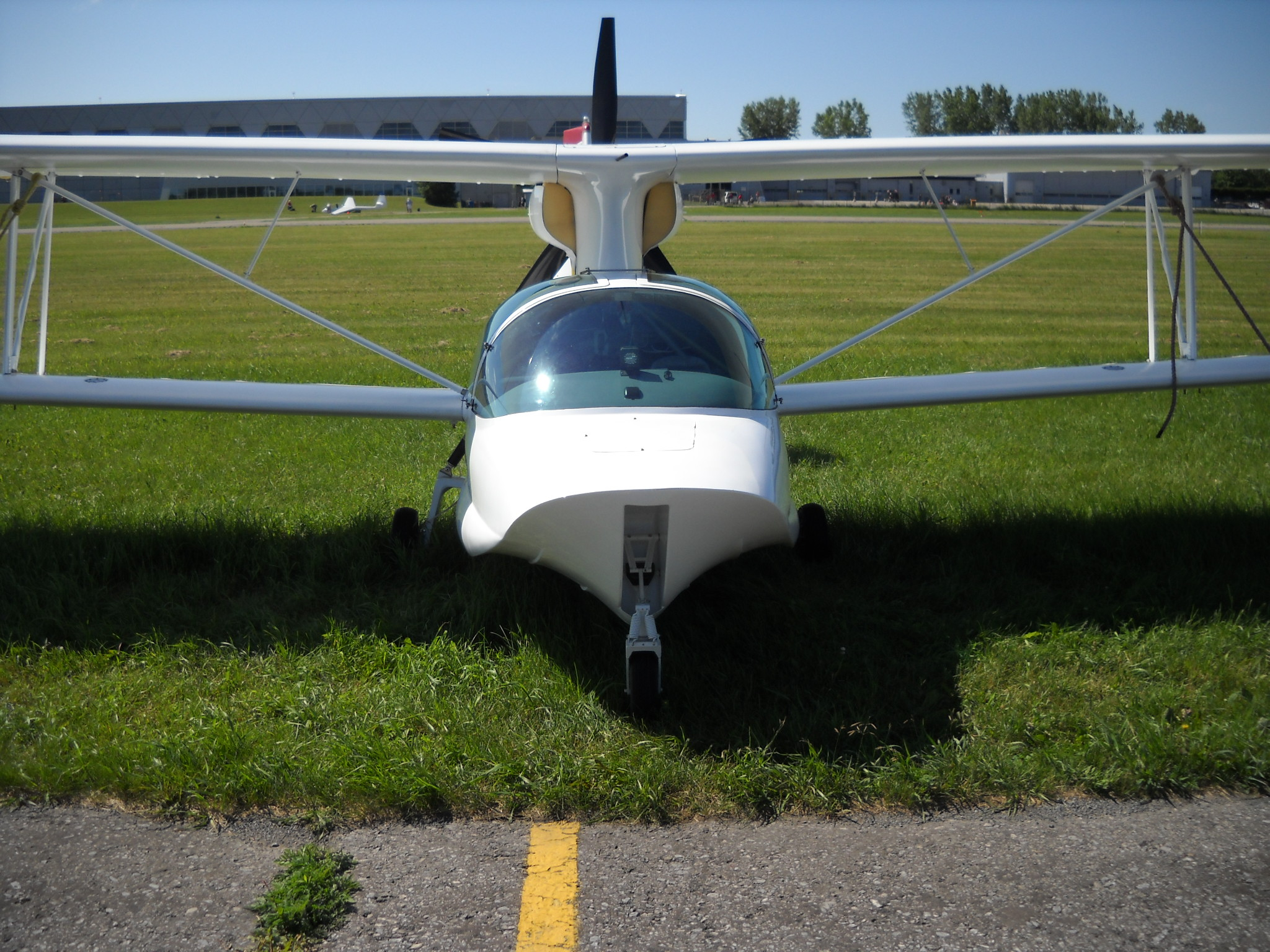
Front view of the Seastar, showing the interplane cross-bracing

The AAC SeaStar is an amphibious biplane that was produced in kitplane form. The aircraft is built largely of composite materials and features wings that may be easily removed for transport, and a ballistic recovery system in the form of a parachute that can be deployed from the engine nacelle.

AAC also marketed a Super Pétrel model in 2011.

This aircraft should not be confused with another composite-built small flying boat with the same name, the SeaStar Aircraft SeaStar.

== Specifications (SeaStar) ==
Data from Kitplanes

General characteristics

- Crew: one
- Capacity: one passenger
- Length: 21 ft 4 in (6.50 m)
- Wingspan: 27 ft 4 in (8.33 m)
- Height: 7 ft 6 in (2.29 m)
- Wing area: 177.6 sq ft (16.50 m^{2})
- Empty weight: 704 lb (319 kg)
- Gross weight: 1,320 lb (599 kg)
- Fuel capacity: 19 U.S. gallons (72 L; 16 imp gal)
- Powerplant: 1 × Rotax 912 four cylinder, horizontally opposed four stroke aircraft engine, 80 hp (60 kW)
- Propellers: 3-bladed ground adjustable

Performance

- Maximum speed: 102 mph (164 km/h, 89 kn)
- Cruise speed: 85 mph (137 km/h, 74 kn)
- Stall speed: 40 mph (64 km/h, 35 kn)
- Range: 425 mi (684 km, 369 nmi)
- Service ceiling: 12,000 ft (3,700 m)
- Rate of climb: 800 ft/min (4.1 m/s)
- Wing loading: 7.43 lb/sq ft (36.3 kg/m^{2})

== See also ==
Related development

- AAC Seastar Sealoon
- EDRA Aeronautica Super Pétrel

Aircraft of comparable role, configuration, and era

- Concept Composites MD03 Transat
- Progressive Aerodyne SeaRey
