= Flugwissenschaftliche Vereinigung Aachen =

Aachen-based non-profit organisation

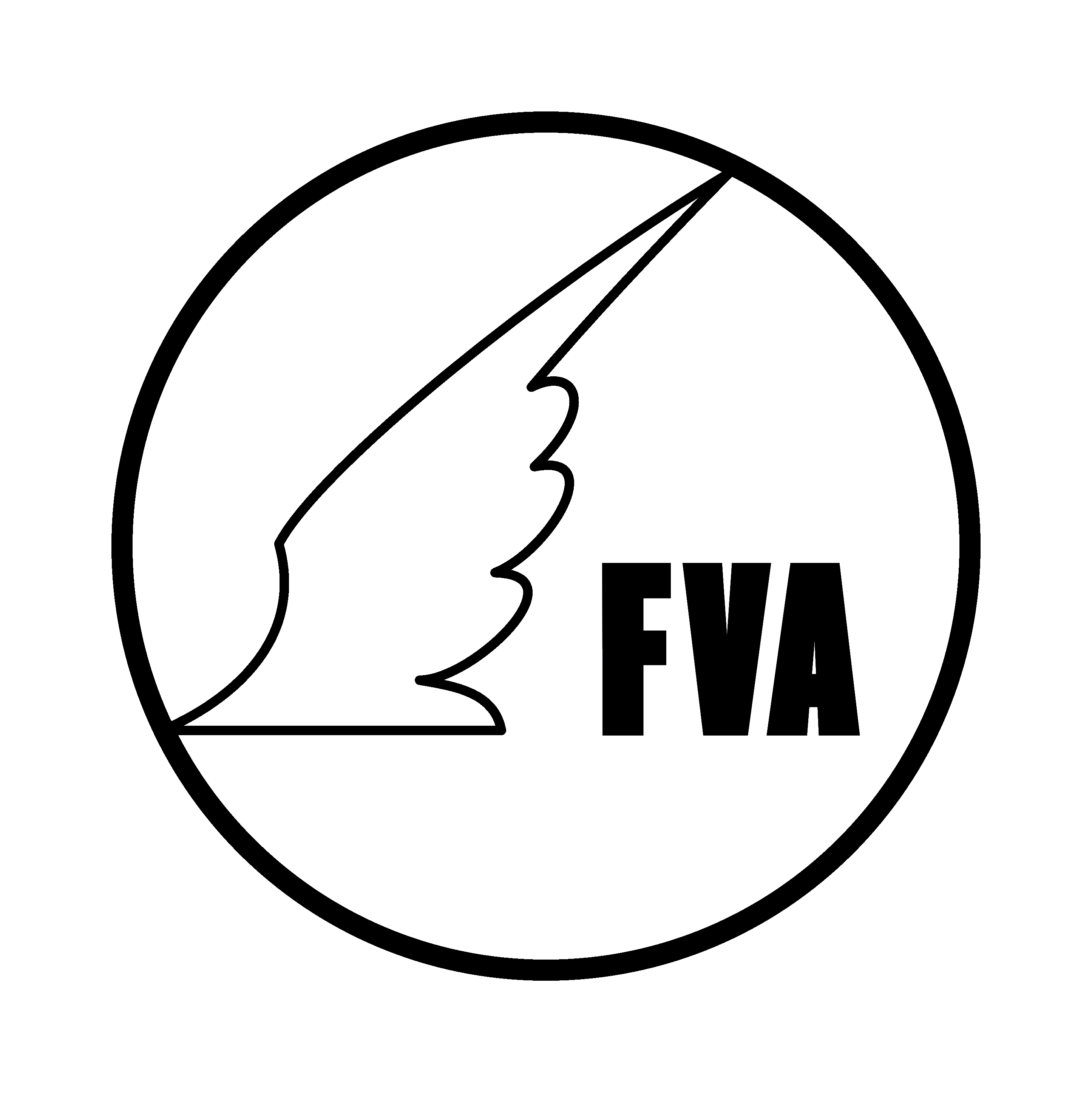
- Formation: 1920
- Legal status: Nonprofit
- Headquarters: Rheinisch-Westfälische Technische Hochschule Aachen, Germany
- Fields: Aviation research
- Members: University students and faculty
- Key people: Theodore von Kármán, Wolfgang Klemperer, Ilse Kober, Theodor Bienen, Hermann Mayer, Dr.-Ing. H. Stein, Prof. Dr.-Ing. A.-W. Quick
- Website: www.fva.rwth-aachen.de

Flugwissenschaftliche Vereinigung Aachen (abbreviation: FVA, English: Flight Research Association Aachen) is a non-profit organization, founded in 1920, which is closely associated to RWTH Aachen University (Rheinisch-Westfälische Technische Hochschule – Aachen), with members consisting of RWTH Aachen students, which have included Felix Kracht. FVA supports and organizes various training courses for flight training, handling of composites and other aircraft materials including steel and aluminum.

Projects handled include research into alternative flaps configuration for Airbus aircraft. As a reward for work carried out in the laboratories and workshops at FVA, 300 hours per annum minimum, each student is granted free flying at the FVA gliding club. Training at the gliding club includes flying gliders, and glider tugs as well as flying instructor training, workshop supervisors and parachute packers. The FVA is under the wing of IDAFLIEG (Interessengemeinschaft deutscher akademischer Fliegergruppen e.V. - interest group for academic flying groups) and takes part in the Summer and Winter camps and seminars organised by IDAFLIEG. Through designing, constructing and flight testing of aircraft and research projects the students can complete their studies, publishing results and theses and gaining valuable skills knowledge and experience.

The glider fleet at FVA Aachen includes a high performance two-seat DG-1000 training glider, Schleicher ASH 25E open class two-seater, Glasflügel 205 Club Libelle and Glasflügel 206 Hornet club class gliders, as well as a Schleicher ASW 28-18 18m class sailplane, all of which can be flown by suitably qualified students. A Robin DR400 for towing the sailplanes is also owned by the FVA.

== Projects ==
The FVA has undertaken the following development projects:

FVA-1 Schwatze Düvel (Black Devil)
Built in 1920 to attend the first Rhön glider contest at Wasserkuppe. Designed by Prof.. Theodore von Kármán and his assistant Wolfgang Klemperer the FVA-1 was a low-wing cantilever monoplane with twin skid undercarriage. The FVA-1 was constructed of wood, with the pilot sitting exposed at the front of the fuselage. Piloted by Klemperer, the FVA-1 won the Rhön contest in 1920, with a straight distance flight of 1,830 m. A year later, on ((date | 30 | August | 1921 | Aviation W)) Klemperer sets a world record for distance, running 4.6 kilometers in 13 minutes. One built.

FVA-2 Blaue Maus (Blue Mouse)
Almost identical to the 'Schwatze Düvel', the 'Blaue maus' had revised seating arrangement and other detail improvements, joining the 'FVA-1' at Wasserkuppe for the 1921 Rhön contest. At least four built, to order.

FVA-3 Ente (Duck)
This canard glider followed the design philosophy of the FVA-1 and FVA-2, with similar cantilevered wings and trousered undercarriage skids, but used a controllable foreplane for stability and control in the pitch and yaw axes. One built.

FVA-4 Pipö
The FVA-4 was a lightweight, low-powered two-seater aircraft to provide cheap reliable training capacity for the flying group students.

FVA-5 Rheinland
The last of Wolfgang Klemperers designs for the FVA was the FVA-5, built simultaneously with the 'FVA-4'. Introducing what was to become the normal layout for gliders into the 1960s with a high wing supported by struts and a fully enclosed cockpit inside the fuselage, at the wing leading edge. The FVA-5 was a high performance aircraft for its time, using lightweight materials pared down to achieve a low empty weight, resulting in a rather fragile aircraft requiring careful ground handling. One built.

FVA-6
After the Allied Control Commission authorised the design and construction of powered aircraft, in 1924, Ilse Kober und Theodor Bienen designed the FVA-6, a tandem two-seater biplane with a 30hp () ABC Scorpion engine. Design and construction overcame many challenges. The first flight, at Düsseldorf-Lohausen airfield, ended in destruction for the FVA-6, the cause put down to inexperience on the part of the newly qualified test pilot. One built.

FVA-7 M Ia
It is uncertain which design was given the FVA-7 designation. The most probable candidate is the M 1a, derived from the Mayer M I by Hermann Mayer, a close associate of FVA. With resurgent interest in soaring the FVA set about building a new sailplane design, the 'FVA-7 m Ia', for training new pilots and to fly in Rhön contests at the Wasserkuppe. After Hermann Mayers success at the 1929 Rhön contest in the Mayer M I, the students at the FVA modified the design with a longer wingspan to improve performance, flying the 'FVA-7 M Ia' at the 1930 Rhön contest with qualified success. One built.

FVA-8 MS II
Based on the M Ia the 'FVA-8 MS II' had a 20m () span wing fitted to the original fuselage, and was also flown at the 1930 Rhön contest, in company with the 'FVA-7 M Ia'. One built.

FVA-9 Blaue Maus II (Blue Mouse II)
In 1933 the FVA students turned their attention to a lightweight soaring glider designed to have good aerodynamic, stability and control properties, as well as a high L/D ratio at a reasonably high speed to allow flight between thermals. A first flight and preliminary testing was carried out in July 1933, with the aircraft being completed at the Wasserkuppe during the 1933 Rhön contest. One built.

FVA-10a Theodor Bienen
The FVA-10a was a progressive development of the 'FVA-9' with a cantilever gull wing. The fuselage lines were smoothed and particular attention was paid to the wing fuselage junction. Initial tests were carried out at Merzbrück, in 1936, without a cockpit cover and testing continued at Prien where the canopy was completed. Performance of the FVA-10a was found to be excellent, fulfilling expectations. One built.

FVA-10b Rheinland
Design of a simplified and improved FVA-10 began in the autumn of 1936 with a new fuselage improvements to the wings and DFS airbrakes on top and bottom surfaces of the wings. The first flight was on 13 May 1937 with flight testing revealing the excellent performance which led to relative success in the 1937 International competition and the 1937 Rhön contest at the Wasserkuppe.

FVA-11 Eifel
In an effort to produce the 'Idealflugzeug' the FVA students designed the FVA-11 which was intended to thermal efficiently, transit between thermals at a reasonable speed with relatively low sink rate, land safely at low airspeed and require no more than three crew members for rigging and de-rigging. By using a thin wing section and high aspect ratio wing as well as flaps the FVA-11 went some way to achieve the goals set. Construction started in February 1938, but deliveries of materials were delayed so the FVA-11 was not ready for the 1938 Rhön contest. Flight testing had started and modifications planned for the aircraft but the FVA-11 was destroyed during World War II.

FVA-12
The actual project designated FVA-12 is not entirely certain, but is most probably a light powered aircraft project from 1937/1938 that was not built due to pressure to complete the FVA-13.

FVA-13 Olympia-Jolle (Olympia Dinghy)
In the spring of 1938, the FVA was invited to participate in the development of a glider that would be flown by all participants at the Olympic Games in 1940. A competition to select the winning design was held at Rome in 1939, with the FVA to supply two prototypes. The first prototype, 'V1', was built at Aachen and the second, 'V2', at FAG Darmstadt (Flugzeug AbteilGesellschaft Darmstadt). The competition was won by the DFS Meise so no further production of the 'FVA-13' was carried out.

FVA-14 Ringflügel (Ring-Wing)
The first project at the FVA after WWII was the FVA-14 Ringflügel, a disc / annular wing aircraft, construction of which began in 1952. Built to investigate the theoretical advantages of a ring wing the FVA-14 was first flown in scale model form, with some success, then wind tunnel tests revealed serious problems with stability which were insurmountable. Work was abandoned and the completed un-flown prototype was stored in a workshop at Aachen where it was broken up to make room for other work.

FVA-15
This project was instigated to research the use of compressed air for creating control forces om glider wings. Developed by Dr.-Ing. H. Stein the system used air blown through slots over the upper surfaces of a wing to produce lift for control purposes. A Grunau Baby III was modified with roll control slits for testing, retaining normal aileron control for safety purposes. Blown compressed air control systems were found to be feasible, but require a high volume/mass flow air supply to be practical, ruling out their widespread use in gliders.

FVA-16 Schaumstoff-Flügel (Foam Material Wing)
Research on composite construction methods at FVA aimed to achieve accurate smooth skin surfaces which are structurally stable and lightweight. The FVA-16 was a project to design and produce a wing using Duralumin sheet skins supported by a foam core. Test sections were built which showed that the foam cored metal skin was barely practicable, due to problems with adhesion, de-lamination and stiffness, requiring thicker skin and foam parts, increasing the weight excessively.

FVA-17 Nurflügler (Tail-less Flyer)
Commissioned by the Bundesverkehrsministerium - (Federal Ministry of Transport), in 1954, the FVA-17 was a tail-less research aircraft based on the Horten Ho33 motor-glider. The FVA was tasked with re-certifying the Ho33 to more modern standards, but it was soon discovered that the Ho33 had been built to lower strength standards, typically 2/3rds of those required for certification. Some flight testing was carried out, but re-design and new construction were not feasible, due to lack of funding, so further work was abandoned.

FVA-18 Primitiv Krähe (Primitive Crow)
In the late 1950s members of the FVA held the opinion that everybody should have the opportunity to own and fly their own aircraft. To achieve this they set about designing a lightweight, affordable powered two-seater training aircraft with benign flight characteristics. Every aspect of the aircraft design was scrutinised and optimised for low weight and cost. Fitted with a converted geared Volkswagen engine the FVA-18 aroused a certain amount of interest, with at least ten sets of plans supplied to budding home-builders. The prototype was re-engined with a Limbach engine, taken from a Fournier RF 5, and re-designated FVA-18b.

FVA-19 Silberkrähe (Silver Crow)
Aero-towing of gliders has been used as a launch method since the early 1930s. The FVA set about the study and design of an efficient glider tug with the FVA-19, as well as make large scale statistical studies of the efficiencies of aero-towing and winch launching. Design of the FVA-19 was completed but the purchase of a Piper Super Cub for aero-towing at the FVA gliding club made further work redundant. Construction of a prototype was carried out, however, at the Flugwissenschaftliche Arbeitsgemeinschaft Bremen with the designation ESS 641, flying for the first time on 17 September 1971.

FVA-20
With the recent publishing of the Standard class rules, students at the FVA set about designing and building the FVA-20, a single-seat glider built from GFRP (Glass-fibre reinforced plastic)/balsa wood sandwich. Construction started in 1967 but was repeatedly delayed, due to a succession of unforeseen problems, until the aircraft was finally ready for flight on 27 November 1979.

FVA-21 Wölbklappenautomatik (Automatic flaps)
At the initiative of Prof. Dr.-Ing. A.-W. Quick the FVA was awarded a research contract to develop an Automatische Wölbklappenverstellung für Segelflugzeuge (Automatic flap system for gliders), by the DFG (Deutschen Forschungs-Gemeinschaft – German research foundation). Using a system of hydraulic dampers, mass balances, rods and levers the flaps can be adjusted automatically to cater for stick movement, in pitch, and 'g'. Initial problems with sensitivity were resolved by changes to the hydraulic damper. For the initial application the FVA was donated a VFW-Fokker FK-3 two-seat glider, into which the system was fitted. Results were very encouraging, with the system also being fitted to the Akaflieg München Mü28 aerobatic glider and a Rolladen-Schneider LS3a competition glider.

FVA-22 Papierrakete (paper rocket)
From 1970 a group of students at the FVA designed and developed an outer atmosphere sounding rocket using a rocket motor built from paper strips wound on a mould. With assistance from the Technical University of Munich (TUM) and the Mobile Raketenbasis (MORABA) of the DFVLR, rockets were test fired but with poor results, exploding on the test stand or in mid -air during launch. Tracing the problem to leakage between the paper plies, allowing uneven burning and thus over-pressurisation and explosion, changes were made and the project progressed. To take advantage of the rotation of the earth and increase attainable altitude, it was proposed to fire production rockets from a launch base in Zäire, negotiations were almost complete when the political situation in Zäire forced the abandonment of the project.

FVA-23 (Glider-tug noise abatement)
From the 1970s excessive noise produced by aircraft has become increasingly unacceptable. In 1976 the FVA received an order from the DFG (Deutschen Forschungs-Gemeinschaft – German research foundation) to research aircraft noise, particularly from glider-towing operations, and develop systems for noise reduction, under the designation FVA-23. The research investigated noise from exhaust systems, propellers, engines and panel vibrations. A demonstration of the noise reduction systems was carried out using the glider tug at the FVA gliding club, a Robin DR400-180R 'Remorqueur', giving a large reduction in noise with only 5% reduction in power.

FVA-24 Wimi (Retractable glider tow rope)
With the spiralling cost of petrol, both AvGas and MoGas, the need to economise on fuel usage becomes more important. Glider tugs flying from smaller airfields typically fly two circuits for every launch, due to the need for rope dropping. To remove the need for rope dropping the FVA students designed and built a retractable tow-rope system that could be retrofitted to glider-tugs. A small winch fitted inside the tug carries the tow-rope when retracted. For launch the rope is pulled out by hand and attached to a Tost hook at the extreme tail of the tug with the rope extending behind the tug to the glider, ensuring that the load from the tow is taken by the tugs structure, not the winch. When the tow is finished the tug-pilot retracts the tow rope, automatically releasing the Tost hook, enabling the tug to land directly without carrying out a rope-dropping circuit. The prototype 'FVA-24 WiMi' system was successfully fitted to the FVA club's Grob G 109 motor-glider tug.

FVA-27
Since the Wright brothers started flying at Kill Devil Hill aircraft designers have recognised that canard aircraft are intrinsically more efficient than conventional aircraft and can also have safety benefits. Students at the FVA have initiated a project to design and build a canard glider to meet standard class competition rules demonstrating significant performance gains over comparable standard class gliders. The FVA-27 is a canard glider constructed from CFK (Carbon-fibre/Kevlar) with a welded steel tube truss fuselage structure.

The anticipated improvements/advantages include:

- Increased aspect ratio through reduced area, while retaining 15m (49 ft 3in) span.
- Reduced drag through reduction in fuselage wetted area.
- Winglets at the tips reducing both induced drag and providing yaw stability.
- Positive lift from the canard for stability reduces drag and increases net lift.
- Improved roll-rate due to reduced roll damping and inertia.
- Good yaw stability from the swept wing and winglets.
- ”Ducks are quasi-overlay them and thus trudelsicher”.
- Improved visibility as the cockpits are forward of the swept wings.
- Reduced gust response.
- Crumple zones absorb impact energies.
- Lack of rear fuselage simplifies rescue system installation.

FVA-28
Being a project of central importance over multiple years, the large workshop of the FVA in Würselen near Aachen has been named FVA-28 as an official project. It is vital in repair and maintenance of the sailplanes as well as offering space and facilities for research projects.
FVA-29
The current research project of the FVA is the design and build of an electro-turbo to fit into the club-owned ASW28-18 sailplane. The projects includes both structural and electronic components as well as the pilot interface.
