= Aceair AERIKS 200 =

Aeriks A-200
- An Aeriks A-200 at Grenchen, Switzerland

General information
- Type: Homebuilt aircraft
- National origin: Switzerland
- Manufacturer: Aceair

History
- First flight: 29 May 2002

The Aceair AERIKS 200 is a Swiss sports plane of highly unusual design. It is being marketed in kitplane form. The AERIKS 200 has a highly streamlined, bullet-shaped fuselage, with a T-tail and large ventral fin, pusher propeller, and canard. The pilot and passenger are seated in tandem. Development aircraft used a fixed undercarriage, but Aceair was planning to offer a version with retractable landing gear.

== Status ==
Aceair ceased operation in 2004, and with it the Aeriks 200 project was cancelled. This was principally due to Diamond Engines cancelling the manufacture of the rotary engine the 200 was based around. Some assets of the company were purchased by a pair of entrepreneurs, and so the Aeriks 200 may eventually see commercial launch someday.

== Specifications (Aeriks A-200) ==
Data from Jane's All The World's Aircraft 2003–2004

General characteristics

- Crew: one, pilot
- Capacity: 1 passenger
- Length: 6.50 m (21 ft 4 in)
- Wingspan: 8.00 m (26 ft 3 in)
- Height: 2.46 m (8 ft 0.75 in)
- Wing area: 6.20 m^{2} (66.7 sq ft)
- Aspect ratio: 11.4:1
- Empty weight: 400 kg (882 lb)
- Max takeoff weight: 650 kg (1,433 lb)
- Powerplant: 1 × Diamond Engines GIAE-110R twin rotor Wankel engine, 78 kW (105 hp)

Performance

- Maximum speed: 287 km/h (179 mph, 151 kn) at sea level
- Cruise speed: 259 km/h (161 mph, 140 kn) at 3,660 m (12,000 ft)
- Stall speed: 108 km/h (67 mph, 58 kn) (flaps down, flown as two-seater)
- Never exceed speed: 370 km/h (230 mph, 200 kn)
- Range: 1,275 km (792 mi, 688 nmi)
- Endurance: 5 h
- Service ceiling: 3,660 m (12,000 ft)
- Rate of climb: 7.1 m/s (1,398 ft/min)
