= Aerosport-Rockwell LB600 =

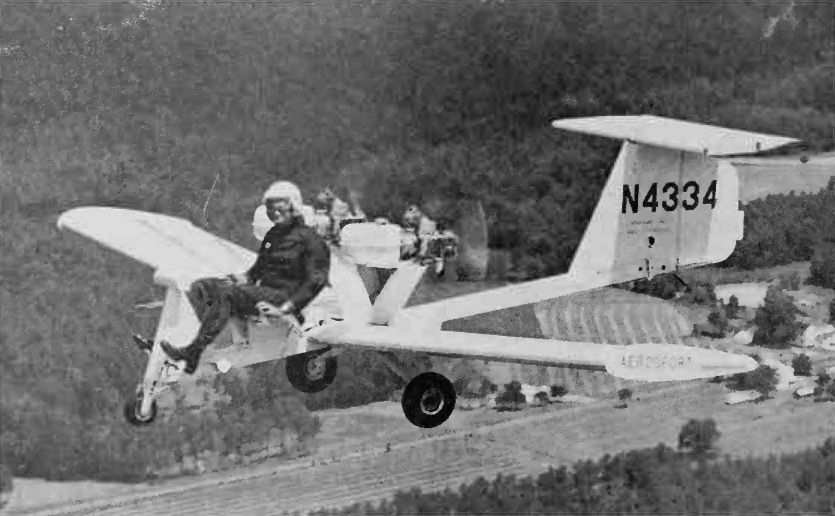
Aerosport Rail

The Aerosport-Rockwell LB600 was a two-cylinder, two-stroke, air-cooled, horizontally opposed engine intended to power ultralights. It was developed in partnership by Aerosport and Rockwell International, based on a Rockwell-designed JLO snowmobile engine.

== Specifications ==
=== General characteristics ===
- Type: 2-cylinder air-cooled horizontally opposed aircraft piston engine
- Bore: 2.953 in (75 mm)
- Stroke: 2.362 in (60 mm)
- Displacement: 32.4 cu in (530 cm³)
- Dry weight: 57 lb (27 kg)

=== Components ===
- Cooling system: Air-cooled

=== Performance ===
- Power output: 45 hp (30 kW) at 5,500 rpm

== Applications ==
- Aerosport Rail
- Calvel Frelon
- PDQ Aircraft PDQ-2
- Thor Duster
