= AAC Seastar Sealoon =

Canadian homebuilt flying boat

Seastar Sealoon
- AAC SeaStar Sealoon prototype

General information
- Type: Amateur-built aircraft
- National origin: Canada
- Manufacturer: Amphibian Airplanes of Canada
- Status: Under development (2012)
- Number built: one prototype

History
- Developed from: AAC SeaStar

The AAC Seastar Sealoon is a Canadian amateur-built flying boat, under development by Amphibian Airplanes of Canada. The aircraft is intended to be supplied as a kit for amateur construction.

== Design and development ==
The Sealoon is derived from the earlier biplane AAC SeaStar and features a cantilever mid-wing, two seats in side-by-side configuration in an enclosed cockpit that is 44 in (112 cm) wide, retractable tricycle landing gear and a single pod-mounted engine in pusher configuration.

The aircraft is made from composites and aluminium with aircraft fabric covering. Its 30.3 ft (9.2 m) span wing has an area of 196 sq ft (18.2 m^{2}). The aircraft's recommended engine power range is 80 to 120 hp (60 to 89 kW) and standard engines used include the 100 hp (75 kW) Rotax 912ULS four-stroke powerplant. Construction time from the supplied kit is estimated as 1000 hours.

The company CEO, Hans Schaer, indicated in June 2010 that development of the Sealoon was being delayed by the ongoing Great Recession.

== Specifications (Sealoon) ==
Data from Kitplanes

General characteristics

- Crew: one
- Capacity: one passenger
- Length: 21.1 ft (6.4 m)
- Wingspan: 30.3 ft (9.2 m)
- Wing area: 196 sq ft (18.2 m^{2})
- Empty weight: 850 lb (386 kg)
- Gross weight: 1,430 lb (649 kg)
- Fuel capacity: 17 U.S. gallons (64 L; 14 imp gal)
- Powerplant: 1 × Rotax 912ULS four cylinder, liquid and air-cooled, four stroke aircraft engine, 100 hp (75 kW)

Performance

- Cruise speed: 100 mph (160 km/h, 87 kn)
- Stall speed: 40 mph (64 km/h, 35 kn)
- Range: 320 mi (510 km, 280 nmi)
- Rate of climb: 750 ft/min (3.8 m/s)
- Wing loading: 7.3 lb/sq ft (36 kg/m^{2})
