= American Homebuilts John Doe =

American homebuilt aircraft

John Doe

General information
- Type: Homebuilt aircraft
- National origin: United States
- Manufacturer: American Homebuilts
- Designer: Steve Nusbaum
- Status: Production completed
- Number built: 3 (2007)

History
- First flight: 1994

The American Homebuilts John Doe is an American STOL homebuilt aircraft that was designed by Steve Nusbaum and produced by American Homebuilts of Hebron, Illinois, first flown in 1994. When it was available the aircraft was supplied as a kit for amateur construction.

== Design and development ==
The aircraft was given its name because the designer and his wife, Carla Nusbaum, could not decide on an appropriate name for the design.

The John Doe features a strut-braced high-wing, a two-seats-in-tandem enclosed cabin, fixed conventional landing gear and a single engine in tractor configuration.

The aircraft is made from welded steel tubing, with its flying surfaces covered in doped aircraft fabric. Its 30.6 ft (9.3 m) span wing mounts flaps, leading edge slats, drooping ailerons, stall fences, winglets and has a wing area of 130.6 sq ft (12.13 m^{2}). It employs a NACA 4415 airfoil. The acceptable power range is 65 to 125 hp (48 to 93 kW) and the standard engines used are the 125 hp (93 kW) Continental IO-240 and 100 hp (75 kW) Continental O-200 powerplants.

The aircraft has a typical empty weight of 878 lb (398 kg) and a gross weight of 1,400 lb (640 kg), giving a useful load of 522 lb (237 kg). With full fuel of 26 U.S. gallons (98 L; 22 imp gal) the payload for the pilot, passenger and baggage is 366 lb (166 kg).

The standard day, sea level, no wind, take off with a 125 hp (93 kW) engine is 150 ft (46 m) and the landing roll is 250 ft (76 m).

The manufacturer estimated the construction time from the supplied kit as 400 hours.

== Operational history ==
By 1998 the company reported that one had been completed and was flying.

By December 2007 a total of three had been completed.

In April 2015 one example was registered in the United States with the Federal Aviation Administration, although a total of three had been registered at one time.

== Specifications (John Doe) ==
Data from AeroCrafter, All-Aero and EAA Experimenter

General characteristics

- Crew: one
- Capacity: one passenger
- Length: 20.8 ft (6.3 m)
- Wingspan: 30.6 ft (9.3 m)
- Height: 6.5 ft (2.0 m)
- Wing area: 130.6 sq ft (12.13 m^{2})
- Aspect ratio: 7.2:1
- Airfoil: NACA 4415
- Empty weight: 878 lb (398 kg)
- Gross weight: 1,400 lb (635 kg)
- Fuel capacity: 26 U.S. gallons (98 L; 22 imp gal)
- Powerplant: 1 × Lycoming O-235 four cylinder, air-cooled, four stroke aircraft engine, 108 hp (81 kW)
- Propellers: 2-bladed metal, fixed pitch

Performance

- Maximum speed: 140 mph (230 km/h, 120 kn)
- Cruise speed: 117 mph (188 km/h, 102 kn)
- Stall speed: 30 mph (48 km/h, 26 kn) flaps down
- Range: 370 mi (600 km, 320 nmi)
- Service ceiling: 13,000 ft (4,000 m)
- Rate of climb: 1,100 ft/min (5.6 m/s)
- Wing loading: 10.7 lb/sq ft (52 kg/m^{2})
