= Association of Alabama Camps =

The Association of Alabama Camps has represented the interests of the children and families who attend camps in Alabama, as well as the camps themselves since 1980. These camps serve around a quarter million children, parents, young adults and seniors each year. The Association's initial project was to contact the Alabama Department of Public Health and solicit their cooperation in developing the original camp inspection standards for Alabama. AAC supports in every way possible other camp organizations such as the American Camp Association and Christian Camp and Conference Association. AAC recognizes that every camp is different, each with a different purpose and serving different people for different reasons. The one thing all Alabama camps have in common is that we must operate our camps under the laws and regulations of the State of Alabama – AAC helps insure that camps have a voice in the regulatory and legislative bodies of Alabama.

AAC Board
Media Relations - Marjorie Davis
President - Allen McBride
Vice-President - Rob Hammond
Secretary/Treasurer - John Stephenson
Governmental Affairs - Kim Adams

== Activities ==
Some of the activities offered at Alabama Camps include:

- Archery
- Kickball
- Basketball
- Football
- Leadership Workshops
- Canoeing
- Crafts
- Disc Sports
- Tennis
- Kayaking
- Rock Climbing
- Outdoor Living Skills
- Horseback
- Water Skiing
- Volleyball
- Dodgeball
- Swimming
- Drama
- Mountain Biking
- Capture the Flag
- Fishing
- Dance
- Team building
- Putt-Putt
- Nature Appreciation
- Tetherball
- Soccer
- Water slides
