= FVA-1 Schwatze Düvel =

German single-seat glider, 1920

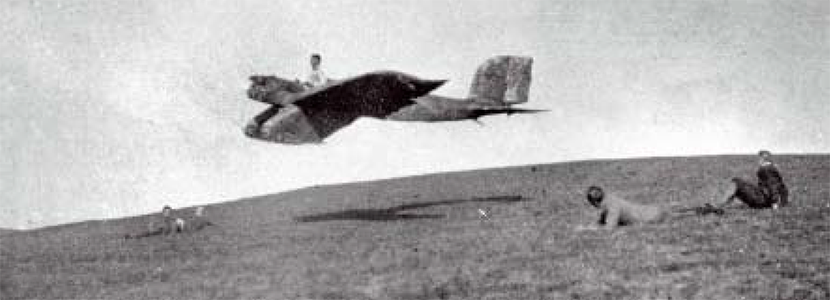

General information
- Type: Glider
- National origin: Germany
- Manufacturer: Flugwissenschaftliche Vereinigung Aachen
- Designer: Professor Theodore Kármán and Wolfgang Klemperer
- Number built: 5

History
- First flight: 1920

The FVA 1 Schwatze Düvel (Black Devil) was a glider produced in Germany in 1920. It was a highly streamlined, thick winged cantilever monoplane.

== Development ==
After World War I aviation in Germany was seriously curtailed by very tight Allied regulation. One loophole in the regulations was gliding, which was virtually ignored. To stimulate interest in the sport, a competition was organised at the Wasserkuppe in August 1920 which became an annual event later known as the Rhön contests. In response, Professor Theodore von Kármán and Wolfgang Klemperer formed an aviation research group at Aachen University called the Flugwissenschaftlichen Vereintung Aachen (Aachen Flight Research Association) (FVA) to design and build gliders for research and for this competition.

For the 1920 Rhön meeting at Wasserkuppe the FVA built a simple monoplane glider. This aircraft, the FVA-1 Schwatze Düvel, was an internally braced, thick airfoil cantilever monoplane with large trousers over landing skids on each side. To keep costs low the aircraft was largely covered in black muslin fabric, donated by the father of a student's girlfriend. Cardboard was used on the wing leading edges and fuselage nose rather than expensive aircraft plywood.

The cockpit was on the leading edge of the wing. Conventional stick and rudder pedals controlled the ailerons, elevator and rudder.

== Operational history ==
Klemperer wished to fly the FVA-1 at the 1920 Rhön meeting but the aircraft had been built without official sanction, so a semi-secret operation was carried out to transport the aircraft by rail under a tarpaulin. One intrepid student spent the entire journey under the tarpaulin with the aircraft. Due to the transport difficulties their arrival at the Wasserkuppe was delayed, but luckily the competition had been extended due to the poor weather.

At the 1920 Rhön meeting Klemperer flew the FVA-1 three times on 3 September, making the first ever bungee launches, a system devised by Klemperer himself. The longest flight that day was 1.830 km (1.137 mi) with a duration of 142 s, much further and longer than the previous best in the competition, set by Pelzner in his hang glider, of 452 m (1,480 ft) in 52 s. The FVA-1 flew again on 7 September in a brisk 30 kn (56 km/h; 35 mph) wind, actually gaining 30 m (98 ft) in height whilst hovering over the ridge, before landing. Two more FVA pilots flew the FVA-1 that day but the aircraft was seriously damaged when the third pilot stalled and crashed the FVA-1 spectacularly. The Schwatze Düvel was repaired and returned to the Wasserkuppe in August 1921 for the next Rhön meeting.

A refined version of the FVA-1 was produced as the FVA-2 Blaue Maus (Blue Mouse). This aircraft followed the arrangement and construction of the FVA-1, with a lower seating position to reduce drag, increased span/area to reduce wing loading and reduced empty weight. Several were produced to order and at least one of these aircraft was fitted with a wheeled undercarriage replacing the main skids and one other was used by Wolfgang Klemperer to research glider launching from balloons. The attempt was unsuccessful as the aircraft entered a flat spin and did not recover before hitting the ground.

Klemperer also took one to the 1921 Rhön meeting at the Wasserkuppe along with the FVA-1, though he won no first prizes, coming second in the least height lost during a flight category and third in both the categories for total duration and for distance flown. The Blaue Maus was also flown by two other pilots, Bienen and Fromm, who had to pass their pilot's tests before being able to fly competition tasks. However, after the contest and now more familiar with his aircraft and with the local terrain, Klemperer made several long distance and long duration flights. On 30 August he flew the Blaue Maus to a world record distance of 4.6 km (2.9 mi) during a 13-minute flight to Gersfeld and back. His record was soon overtaken by that of another competitor who remained on site after the contest, Arthur Martens in the Hannover Vampyr. In September he made a 7.5 km (4.7 mi) flight.

== Variants ==
- FVA-1 Schwatze Düvel: the first glider produced by the FVA, under the tutelage of Wolfgang Klemperer, one built.
- FVA-2 Blaue Maus: A refined version of the FVA-1, four were built, at least one with a wheeled undercarriage.

== Specifications (FVA-1 Schwatze Düvel) ==
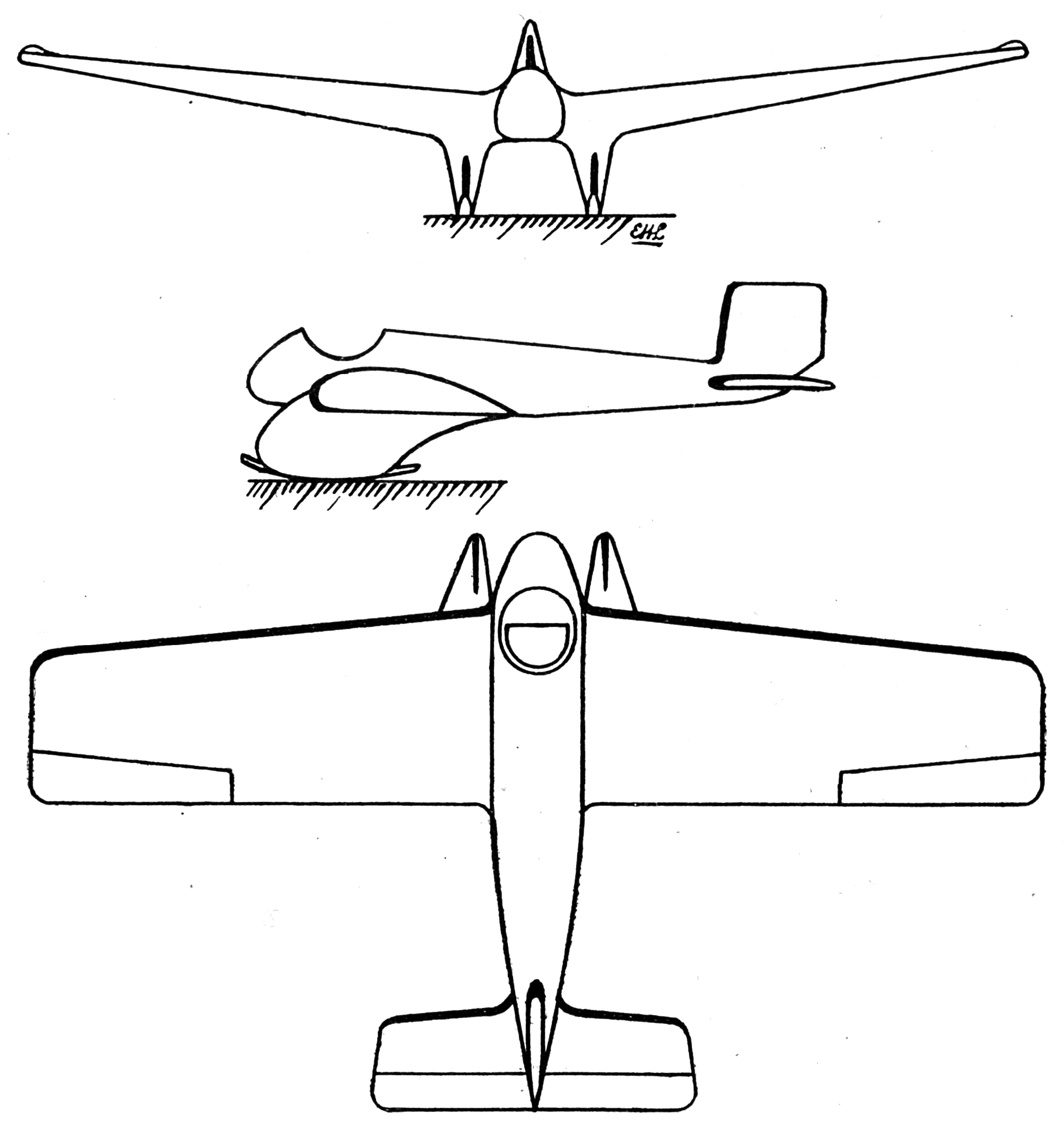
FVA-1 Schwatze Düvel 3-view drawing from Les Ailes March 23, 1922

Data from Simons, Martin. Sailplanes 1920-1945 2nd revised edition. EQIP Werbung und Verlag G.m.b.H.. Königswinter. 2006. ISBN 3-9806773-4-6

General characteristics

- Crew: One
- Length: 5.6 m (18 ft 5 in)
- Wingspan: 9.3 m (30 ft 6 in) [FVA-2 9.45m / 31ft]
- Wing area: 15 m^{2} (161.45 sq ft) [FVA-2 13.7m^{2} / 147sqft]
- Aspect ratio: 6.02
- Empty weight: 62 kg (137 lb) [FVA-2 53kg / 117lb]
- Gross weight: 136 kg (300 lb)

Performance

- Maximum glide ratio: 6:1
