= Airbridge Fregat-Hydro =

Russian ultralight trike

Fregat-Hydro

General information
- Type: Ultralight trike
- National origin: Russia
- Manufacturer: Airbridge
- Status: In production (2013)

The Airbridge Fregat-Hydro is a Russian seaplane ultralight trike, designed and produced by Airbridge of Moscow. The aircraft is supplied as a complete ready-to-fly-aircraft.

== Design and development ==
The Fregat-Hydro was designed to comply with the Fédération Aéronautique Internationale microlight category. It features a cable-braced hang glider-style high-wing, weight-shift controls, a two-seats-in-tandem open cockpit, twin inflatable floats and a single engine in pusher configuration.

The Fregat-Hydro is made from bolted-together aluminum tubing, with its double surface wing covered in Dacron sailcloth. Its 9.28 m (30.4 ft) span wing is supported by a single tube-type kingpost and uses an "A" frame weight-shift control bar. On the more recent models the powerplant is a modified liquid-cooled, four-stroke, 80 hp (60 kW) Suzuki automotive engine. The aircraft has an empty weight of 230 kg (507 lb) and a gross weight of 500 kg (1,102 lb), giving a useful load of 270 kg (595 lb). With full fuel of 33 litres (7.3 imp gal; 8.7 US gal) the payload is 246 kg (542 lb).

== Specifications (Fregat-Hydro) ==
Data from Bayerl

General characteristics

- Crew: one
- Capacity: one passenger
- Wingspan: 9.28 m (30 ft 5 in)
- Wing area: 16.5 m^{2} (178 sq ft)
- Empty weight: 230 kg (507 lb)
- Gross weight: 500 kg (1,102 lb)
- Fuel capacity: 33 litres (7.3 imp gal; 8.7 US gal)
- Powerplant: 1 × Suzuki liquid-cooled, four stroke automotive engine, 60 kW (80 hp)
- Propellers: 3-bladed composite

Performance

- Maximum speed: 130 km/h (81 mph, 70 kn)
- Cruise speed: 100 km/h (62 mph, 54 kn)
- Stall speed: 60 km/h (37 mph, 32 kn)
- Rate of climb: 6.5 m/s (1,280 ft/min)
- Wing loading: 27.3 kg/m^{2} (5.6 lb/sq ft)
