= Concept Composites MD03 Transat =

French ultralight aircraft

MD03 Transat
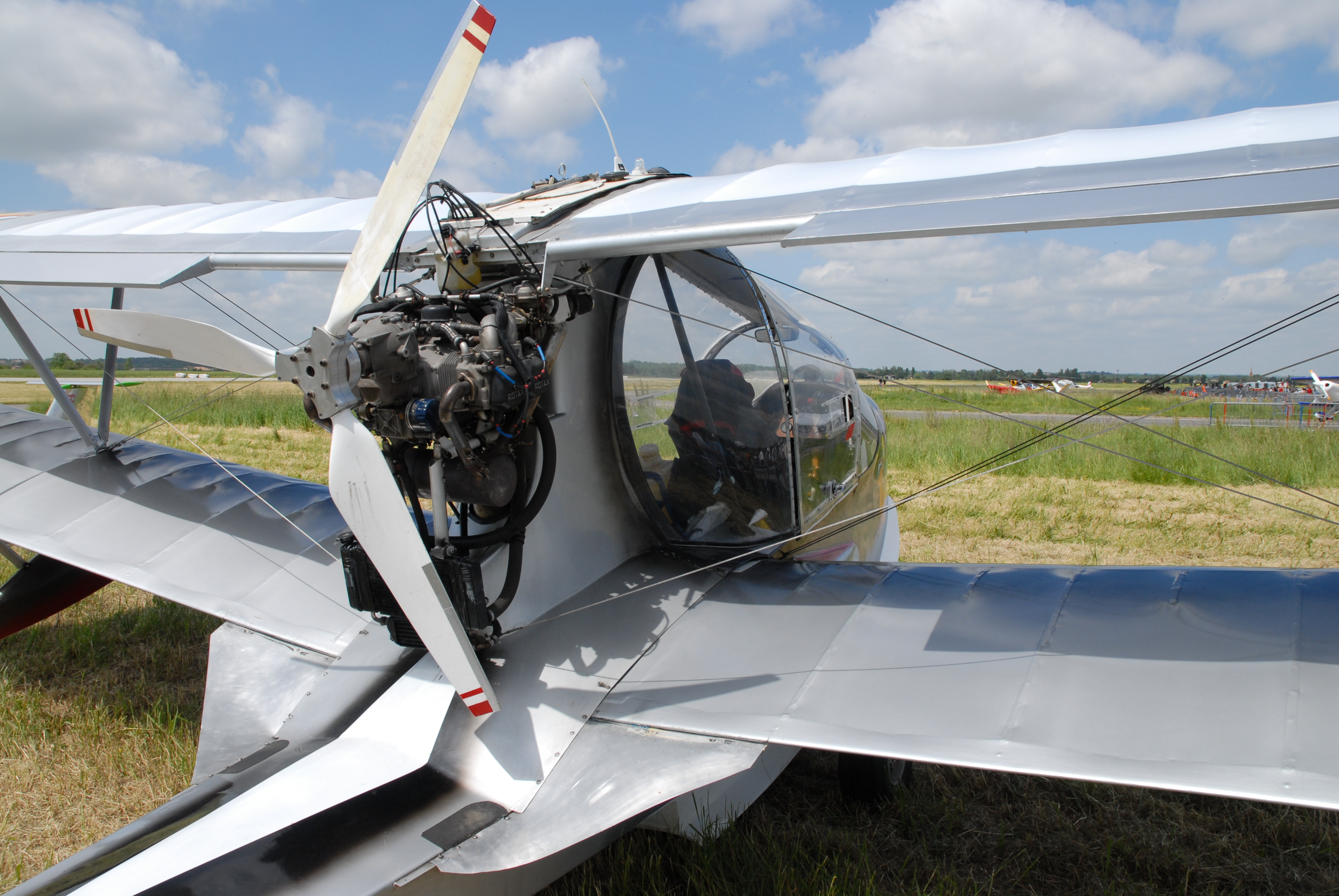

General information
- Type: Ultralight aircraft and Light-sport aircraft amphibious flying boat
- National origin: France
- Manufacturer: Concept Composites
- Status: In production

The Concept Composites MD03 Transat is a French amphibious flying boat ultralight and light-sport aircraft that was designed and produced by Concept Composites of Pouancé. The aircraft is supplied as a complete ready-to-fly-aircraft.

== Design and development ==
The Transat was designed to comply with both French microlight and US light-sport aircraft rules. It features a biplane layout with two seats in side-by-side configuration within an enclosed cockpit, fixed conventional landing gear and a single engine in pusher configuration.

The aircraft fuselage is made from composites, with its flying surfaces covered in doped aircraft fabric. Its 8.80 m (28.9 ft) span wing has an area of 18 m^{2} (190 sq ft). The standard powerplant is an 80 hp (60 kW) BMW 1100RS fuel injected, four-stroke engine. The landing gear is retracted electrically, with a back-up manual system. The Transat is advertised as the only amphibious microlight that can take-off from water at maximum gross weight in under 15 seconds.

== Specifications (MD03 Transat) ==
Data from Bayerl

General characteristics

- Crew: one
- Capacity: one passenger
- Wingspan: 8.80 m (28 ft 10 in)
- Wing area: 18 m^{2} (190 sq ft)
- Empty weight: 300 kg (661 lb)
- Gross weight: 495 kg (1,091 lb)
- Powerplant: 1 × BMW 1100RS fuel injected, four stroke engine, 60 kW (80 hp)

Performance

- Maximum speed: 150 km/h (93 mph, 81 kn)
- Cruise speed: 140 km/h (87 mph, 76 kn)
- Stall speed: 64 km/h (40 mph, 35 kn)
- Rate of climb: 4 m/s (790 ft/min)
- Wing loading: 27.5 kg/m^{2} (5.6 lb/sq ft)

== See also ==
- AAC SeaStar
