= Arocet =

American aircraft manufacturer

Arocet Inc was an American aircraft manufacturer established by Tom Hamilton in Arlington, Washington in the 1980s to market military derivatives of the Glasair III homebuilt aircraft that Hamilton had worked on as part of Stoddard-Hamilton Aircraft.

== Products ==
- Arocet AT-9 (1988) Turboprop engine two-seat low-wing monoplane with retractable undercarriage. One built
