= American Homebuilts =

Former American aircraft kit manufacturer

American Homebuilts Corporation
- Company type: Privately held company
- Industry: Aerospace
- Founded: circa 1994
- Founder: Steve Nusbaum
- Defunct: by October 2006
- Fate: Out of business
- Headquarters: United States
- Products: Kit aircraft

American Homebuilts Corporation was an American aircraft manufacturer, founded by Steve Nusbaum and based in Hebron, Illinois. The company specialized in the design and manufacture of light aircraft in the form of kits for amateur construction.

Nusbaum formed the company circa 1994 to develop and market the American Homebuilts John Doe STOL two-seat homebuilt aircraft. The company was out of business by October 2006.

By April 2015 the Federal Aviation Administration had one John Doe registered in the United States, although three had been registered at one time. Two were prototypes, formerly registered to Nusbaum, while the third, still registered, was a customer aircraft, completed in 2012.

== Aircraft ==
Summary of aircraft built by American Homebuilts
Model name	First flight	Number built	Type
American Homebuilts John Doe	1994	3	Two-seat homebuilt aircraft
