= FVA-18 =

General information
- Type: Lightweight Training Aircraft
- National origin: Germany
- Manufacturer: Flugwissenschaftliche Vereinigung Aachen
- Number built: 1

History
- First flight: 16 September 1965

The FVA-18 Primitivkrähe (English: Primitive Crow) was a 1960s German lightweight training aircraft designed and built at Flugwissenschaftliche Vereinigung Aachen.

== Design and development ==
The design and construction of the two-seat light aircraft was started in 1959 and it was first flown on 16 September 1965. It was a high-wing monoplane which looked similar to a primary glider, powered by a modified 40 hp (30 kW) Volkswagen motor car engine.

== Specifications ==
Data from The Illustrated Encyclopedia of Aircraft

General characteristics

- Crew: 2
- Length: 20 ft 10 in (6.35 m)
- Wingspan: 34 ft 5.5 in (10.5 m)
- Height: 8 ft 2.5 in (2.50 m)
- Wing area: 169 sq ft (15.70 m^{2})
- Empty weight: 551 lb (250 kg)
- Gross weight: 992 lb (450 kg)
- Powerplant: 1 × Volkswagen motor car engine modified by Pollman , 40 hp (30 kW)

Performance

- Maximum speed: 67 mph (108 km/h, 58 kn)
- Range: 155 mi (250 km, 135 nmi)
- Service ceiling: 11,405 ft (3,475 m)
