= Aerosport Quail =

Ultralight aircraft

Quail
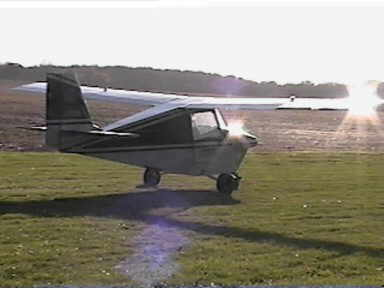

General information
- Type: Recreational aircraft
- Manufacturer: Homebuilt aircraft from Aerosport plans
- Designer: Harris Woods
- Number built: 10 (as of 1980)

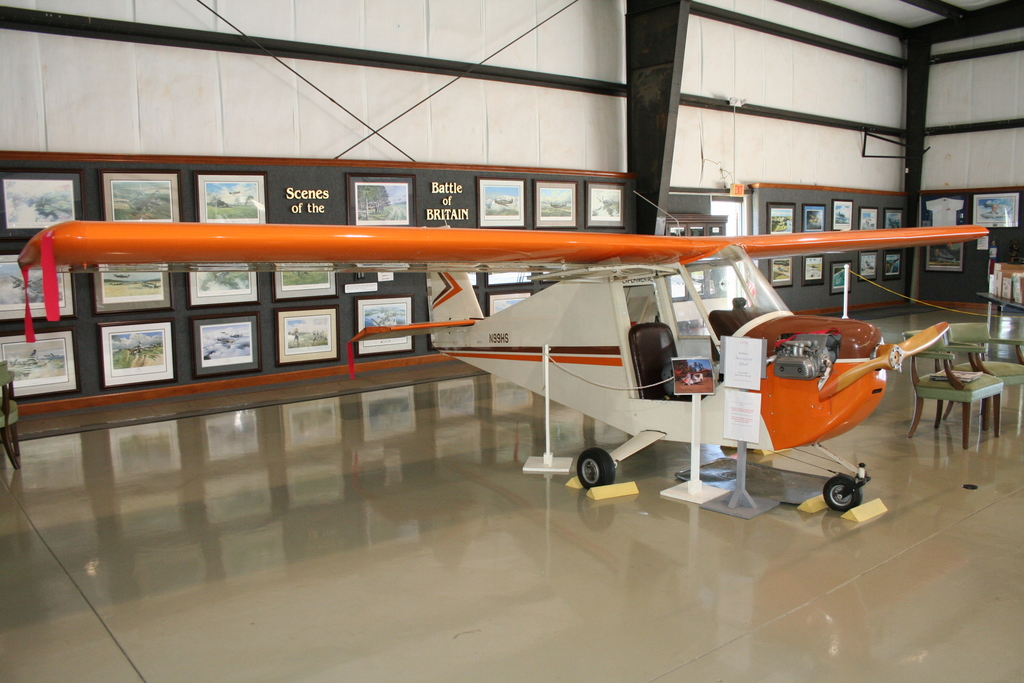
Quail on display at the North Carolina Aviation Museum

The Aerosport Quail is an ultralight aircraft that was designed for home building by Harris Woods. First offered for sale in 1971, by the end of the decade, 375 sets of plans had been sold, with around 26 aircraft under construction and 10 flying.

== Design ==
The Quail is an all-metal cantilever high-wing monoplane with an enclosed cabin and tricycle undercarriage. The aircraft uses simple flat-sided construction with pop-rivet assembly. The wing design is unmodified from the Aerosport Rail homebuilt. The prototype was powered with a Rockwell L680R engine.

== Aircraft on display ==
There are Quails on display at the North Carolina Aviation Museum in Asheboro, North Carolina, and the Pima Air Museum in Tucson, Arizona.

== Specifications (Aerosport Quail) ==
Data from Sport Aviation

General characteristics

- Crew: 1
- Wingspan: 24 ft (7.3 m)
- Wing area: 84 sq ft (7.8 m^{2})
- Empty weight: 435 lb (197 kg)
- Gross weight: 750 lb (340 kg)
- Fuel capacity: 8
- Powerplant: 1 × Volkswagen Horizontally opposed piston, 50 hp (37 kW)
- Propellers: 2-bladed

Performance

- Maximum speed: 109 kn (125 mph, 201 km/h)
- Cruise speed: 100 kn (120 mph, 190 km/h)
- Stall speed: 39 kn (45 mph, 72 km/h)
- Range: 196 nmi (225 mi, 362 km)
- Service ceiling: 12,000 ft (3,700 m)
- Rate of climb: 820 ft/min (4.2 m/s)
- Wing loading: 8.92 lb/sq ft (43.6 kg/m^{2})
