= Christian Camp and Conference Association =

American member organization for Christian camps

- Abbreviation: CCCA
- Formation: 1963
- Type: Nonprofit trade association
- Headquarters: Colorado Springs, Colorado, U.S.
- Region served: United States
- Members: 800+ member camps and conference centers
- President and CEO: Gregg Hunter
- Website: ccca.org

The Christian Camp and Conference Association (CCCA) is a national non-profit Christian organization composed of member camps and conference centers across the United States. It is the largest of 21 autonomous regional associations affiliated with Christian Camping International (CCI), a global network of Christian camps operating on six continents. CCCA membership has fluctuated over time: 860 member camps were reported in 2018, growing to nearly 900 by 2023, and standing at more than 800 camps and conference centers serving approximately 7 million campers and guests annually as of 2025. The organization publishes InSight magazine and the Flint & Steel e-newsletter, and describes its mission as maximizing ministry for member camps and conference centers.

== History ==
Several regional groups of Christian camp and Bible conference leaders in the United States and Canada began to meet informally in the late 1940s and early 1950s. These independent coalitions later combined their efforts under the name Christian Camp and Conference Association International, and eventually incorporated in 1963.

As the association’s influence spread, the name was changed to Christian Camping International (CCI). In 2005, the leadership of CCI/USA decided to eliminate the often misleading term "camping" from the organization's name, and return to Christian Camp and Conference Association (CCCA). Today, CCCA is the largest of 21 autonomous associations on six continents. Most major denominations and church associations, as well as many nationally recognized youth and adult ministries, are represented in CCCA. About half of CCCA's member camps and centers are independent organizations.

== Leadership ==
As of 2025, CCCA is led by Gregg Hunter, who serves as President and CEO. Hunter has held the role since at least 2018. The organization's board is chaired by Gabe Valencia, with Ed Covert serving as vice chair.

== Response to the Camp Mystic tragedy ==
In July 2025, catastrophic flash flooding in Kerr County, Texas, killed 27 campers and counselors at Camp Mystic, a girls' camp that was not affiliated with CCCA. Gregg Hunter, CCCA's chief executive, called the tragedy "truly, truly heartbreaking for the whole community of Christian camping." Writing days later, The New York Times reported that camp directors nationwide had been fielding anxious questions from parents, quoting Hunter: "They're asking the simple question, 'Is it safe?' ... And they're saying, 'How can you prove to me it's safe?'" Although Camp Mystic was outside CCCA's membership, Hunter said concerned parents nonetheless contacted CCCA-affiliated camps in the aftermath, prompting the association to strengthen safety training and emergency-communication protocols across its member network. One year after the flood, CCCA said member camps had reported record or near-record summer attendance despite the tragedy and continuing staffing pressures across the industry.
