= Aerosport Scamp =

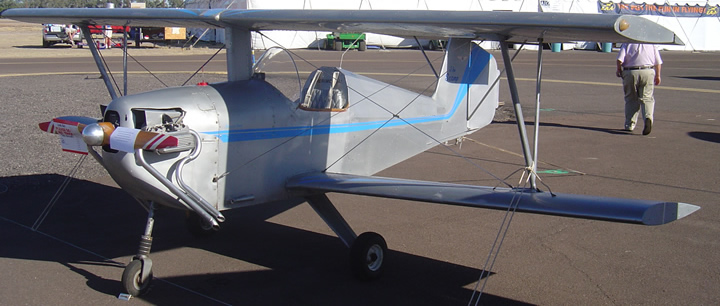

General information
- Type: Sport aircraft
- National origin: United States
- Manufacturer: Homebuilt
- Designer: Harris Woods

History
- First flight: August 21, 1973

The Aerosport Scamp A is a small biplane designed for home building by Harris Woods. It featured an open cabin, tricycle undercarriage, and a T-tail.

The Scamp A first flew on August 21 1973, powered by an 1853 cc Volkswagen car engine. 1,050 sets of plans had sold by 1993. In addition to the many examples which have been completed in the United States, several examples of the type are active in the United Kingdom.

The Agrocopteros Scamp B is an agricultural crop spraying version of the Scamp, modified from kits assembled in Colombia.

== Specifications (Scamp A) ==
Data from Jane's All the World's Aircraft, 1988–1989

General characteristics

- Crew: 1
- Length: 14 ft 0 in (4.27 m)
- Wingspan: 17 ft 6 in (5.33 m)
- Height: 5 ft 6.5 in (1.689 m)
- Wing area: 105 sq ft (9.8 m^{2})
- Airfoil: NACA 23012
- Empty weight: 520–550 lb (236–249 kg)
- Max takeoff weight: 768–798 lb (348–362 kg)
- Powerplant: 1 × VW 4-cylinder air-cooled horizontally-opposed piston engine, 60 hp (45 kW) a modified Volkswagen automotive engine
- Propellers: 2-bladed fixed-pitch propeller, 4 ft 8 in (1.42 m) diameter

Performance

- Maximum speed: 91 kn (105 mph, 169 km/h)
- Cruise speed: 78 kn (90 mph, 144 km/h)
- Stall speed: 39 kn (45 mph, 72 km/h)
- Range: 108 nmi (124 mi, 200 km)
- Service ceiling: 12,000 ft (3,700 m)
- g limits: +6 -3
- Take-off run: 400 ft (122 m)
- Landing run: 400 ft (122 m)

== See also ==
- Aerosport
