= Airbridge (ultralight aircraft manufacturer) =

Russian ultralight aircraft manufacturer

- Company type: Privately held company
- Industry: Aerospace
- Headquarters: Moscow, Russia
- Products: Ultralight trikes
- Website: www.veter50.ru/delt

Airbridge is a Russian aircraft manufacturer based in Moscow. The company specializes in the design and manufacture of ultralight trikes.

The company is the largest trike producer in Moscow. The company is noted for its use of modified four stroke Suzuki automotive engines.

== Aircraft ==
Summary of aircraft built by Airbridge
| Model name | First flight | Number built | Type |
|---|---|---|---|
| Airbridge Cruiser Suzuki | 2004 | | Two seat tandem ultralight trike |
| Airbridge Fregat-Hydro | | | Two seat tandem ultralight trike floatplane |
