= Austin Animal Services =

Agency of the government of Austin, Texas

Austin Animal Services is an agency of the government of Austin, Texas. It provides animal services to the City of Austin and to unincorporated areas in Travis County. Its animal shelter is the Austin Animal Center (AAC).

== History ==
The city government contracted animal services for its city-owned facility to the Austin Humane Society beginning circa 1954. An audit that had negative conclusions about the shelter management had surfaced, and in January 1993 the city stopped using the society for management of its shelter. Animal Shelter of Austin Inc. was the new entity put in responsibility of the shelter. At the time most of the buildings were owned by the humane society while the society also leased land owned by the city government. At the time, there was only one shelter in the city limits.

Previously the shelter used a location near Lady Bird Lake. In 2011 it moved to a new location in East Austin. There were some people who opposed the move as a large portion of Austinites at the time who adopted animals lived west of Interstate 35 while the new location would be further away. By 2012 there had been increased adoption activity.

In 2010 the animal shelter started a policy stating that at least 90% of the animals should leave the shelter alive, which would make it "no kill".

In 2019 Don Bland became the director of the department.

In 2022, animal surrenders had increased because of rising prices of consumer goods.
