= Aachen Flugzeugbau =

1917–1923 aircraft manufacturer in Germany

- Industry: Manufacturing
- Products: Aircraft

Aachen Flugzeugbau was a German aircraft manufacturer of the early 20th century, established around the time of World War I. With the end of the war and the prohibition on powered flight in Germany, the firm began to specialize in sailplane construction, and in 1921 became known as Aachener Segelflugzeugbau, producing designs by Wolfgang Klemperer. It was purchased by Junkers in 1923. In 1923 the K. F. glider-related light airplane (also a Klemperer design) was in production. In 1924 a two-seat low-wing monoplane was also flown.
