= Aerosport Rail =

Rail
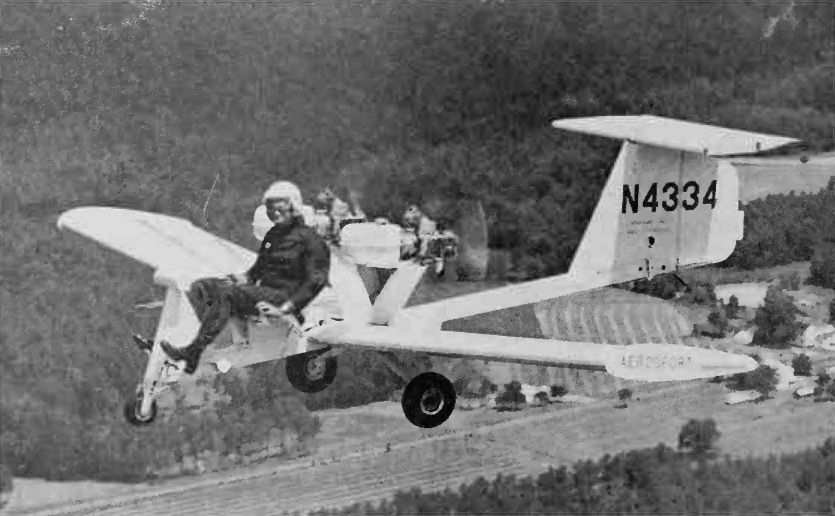

General information
- Type: Ultralight aircraft
- Manufacturer: Aerosport
- Designer: Harris Woods
- Number built: unknown

History
- First flight: 14 November 1970

The Aerosport Rail is an American minimalist ultralight aircraft, designed by Harris Woods and built by Aerosport Inc. The aircraft was first flown on 14 November 1970.

== Design and development ==
The Rail is little more than a 2 by 5 inch squared aluminium tube (rail) with all-metal wings and a T-tail. The pilot sits on the tube, just ahead of and above the wings. Two small two-cycle engines derated to 25 hp (19 kW) are mounted on struts behind the seat on either side of centerline, driving pusher propellers. Individual 4 U.S. gallons (15 L; 3.3 imp gal) fiberglass fuel tanks are mounted in front of each engine. About 175 sets of plans were sold between 1970 and 1977. The follow-on design, the Aerosport Quail uses the Rail's wing design for an enclosed tractor configuration homebuilt aircraft.

== Specifications ==
Data from Air Trails

General characteristics

- Crew: 1 (pilot)
- Length: 15 ft 9 in (4.80 m)
- Wingspan: 23 ft 4 in (7.11 m)
- Wing area: 81.5 sq ft (7.57 m^{2})
- Empty weight: 380 lb (172 kg)
- Gross weight: 650 lb (295 kg)
- Fuel capacity: 8 gal
- Powerplant: 2 × Aerosport-Rockwell LB600 automotive engines, 45 hp (34 kW) each de-rated to 25hp
- Propellers: 2-bladed

Performance

- Maximum speed: 96 mph (154 km/h, 83 kn)
- Cruise speed: 66 mph (106 km/h, 57 kn)
- Stall speed: 42 mph (68 km/h, 36 kn)
- Never exceed speed: 115 mph (185 km/h, 100 kn)
- Range: 120 mi (190 km, 100 nmi)
- Service ceiling: 12,000 ft (3,700 m)
- g limits: 3.8+

== See also ==
Aircraft of comparable role, configuration, and era

- Beaujon Enduro
- Beaujon Mach .07
- Colomban Cri-cri
- Hovey Whing Ding
- RLU-1 Breezy
