= Aerosport Woody Pusher =

Woody Pusher
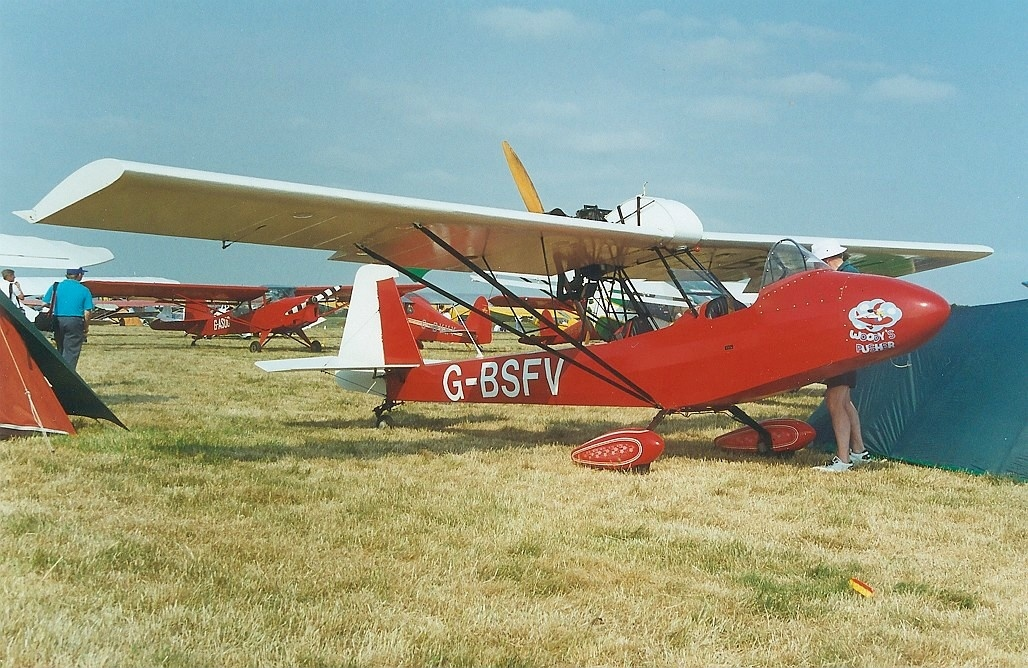

General information
- Type: Homebuilt aircraft
- Manufacturer: Aerosport
- Designer: Harris Woods

The Aerosport Woody Pusher is a two-seat parasol wing monoplane designed for home building by Harris Woods, based closely on the Curtiss Junior. First marketed in the 1960s, at least 27 were flying by 1980.

One is on display at the Wings Over the Rockies Air and Space Museum, Denver, Colorado, with a 75-hp Continental engine (No. N393EA). Another, N100FQ, is displayed at the Florida Air Museum, Lakeland, Florida.

== Specifications ==
Data from Jane's All the World's Aircraft 1969–70

General characteristics

- Crew: 1
- Capacity: 1 passenger
- Length: 20 ft 5 in (6.22 m)
- Wingspan: 29 ft 0 in (8.84 m)
- Height: 7 ft 0 in (2.13 m)
- Wing area: 130 sq ft (12 m^{2})
- Empty weight: 630 lb (286 kg)
- Max takeoff weight: 1,150 lb (522 kg)
- Fuel capacity: 12 US gal (10.0 imp gal; 45 L)
- Powerplant: 1 × Continental A75 4-cyl. air-cooled horizontally-opposed piston engine, 75 hp (56 kW) typical powerplant
- Propellers: 2-bladed wooden fixed pitch propeller

Performance

- Maximum speed: 85 kn (98 mph, 158 km/h) at sea level
- Cruise speed: 76 kn (87 mph, 140 km/h)
- Stall speed: 39 kn (45 mph, 72 km/h)
- Endurance: 2 hr 30 min
- Rate of climb: 600 ft/min (3.0 m/s)

== See also ==
- Curtiss-Wright Junior
