= Aceair =

- Company type: Privately held company
- Founded: 1999
- Headquarters: Manno (Ticino), Switzerland

Aceair SA was a Swiss aircraft manufacturer established in Manno in 1999. It was developing the AERIKS 200 in kitplane form.

== Status ==
Aceair ceased operation in 2004, and with it the Aeriks 200 project was cancelled. This was principally due to Diamond Engines cancelling the manufacture of the rotary engine the 200 was based around. Some assets of the company were purchased by a pair of entrepreneurs, and so the Aeriks 200 may eventually see commercial launch someday.
