= Advanced Aircraft =

American Aircraft company

- Company type: Private
- Genre: Aerospace
- Founded: 1983
- Headquarters: Carlsbad, California, USA

Advanced Aircraft Corporation (AAC) is an aircraft manufacturer based in Carlsbad, California.

== History ==
AAC was founded in 1983, and bought out Riley Aircraft that same year.

== Products ==
The firm has specialised in converting piston-engined Cessna aircraft to turbine-engined configuration with Pratt & Whitney Canada PT6A turboprops.
