= Aerosport OY =

Estonian aircraft manufacturer

- Company type: Privately held company
- Industry: Aerospace
- Headquarters: Keila, Estonia
- Products: Powered parachutes, paramotors
- Website: www.aerosport.ee

Aerosport OY is an Estonian aircraft manufacturer based in Keila. The company specializes in the design and manufacture of powered parachutes and paramotors in the form of ready-to-fly aircraft for the US FAR 103 Ultralight Vehicles rules and the European Fédération Aéronautique Internationale microlight category.

The company produces lines of both powered parachutes and paramotors that are noted for their wide choice of engine, propeller and reduction drive combinations.

== Aircraft ==
Summary of aircraft built by Aerosport OY
Model name	First flight	Number built	Type
Aerosport OY Evo			single-place paramotor
Aerosport OY Spider	mid 2000s		single-place paramotor
Aerosport OY Sport			single-place paramotor
Aerosport OY Sport Next			single-place paramotor
Aerosport OY Sport Power			single-place paramotor
Aerosport OY Sport+			single-place paramotor
Aerosport OY Trike PT1+1			Single-place powered parachute
Aerosport OY Trike T1+1			Single-place powered parachute
Aerosport OY Trike PT2			Two-place powered parachute
