= Apco Aviation =

Israeli aircraft manufacturer

Apco Aviation Limited
- Type: Privately held company
- Industry: Aerospace
- Founded: 1982
- Founder: Anatoly Cohn
- Headquarters: Caesarea, Israel
- Key people: CEO: Anatoly Cohn
- Products: Hang gliders, paragliders, ultralight aircraft, harnesses, parachute rescue systems and accessories
- Number of employees: 60
- Website: www.apcoaviation.com

Apco Aviation (usually styled APCO) is an Israeli aircraft manufacturer based in Caesarea and founded in 1982 by Anatoly Cohn. The company specializes in the design and manufacture of paragliders and at one time also made hang gliders and ultralight aircraft. It also manufacturers paraglider harnesses, the Mayday line of parachute rescue systems and other accessories.

Cohn started building his first prototype hang glider in 1974. In 1978 he produced his first high performance hang glider and in 1982 started Apco Aviation. The company started producing paragliders in 1986 and has built more than 40 different models. It produces a wide range of paragliders that has included the competition Apco Simba, the Prima trainer, the Fiesta beginner glider, the intermediate Presta and Keara.

The company occupies a 3,200 m^{2} (34,000 sq ft) factory in northern Israel that was specifically built for Apco. It employs 60 people there.

In 1991 the Apco HiLite III set a World Distance Record for paragliders. The Apco Extra was also later flown to another World Distance Record for paragliders. In 2000 the Apco Futura set a world record, the company's tenth world record. The company's paragliders hold eleven world records.

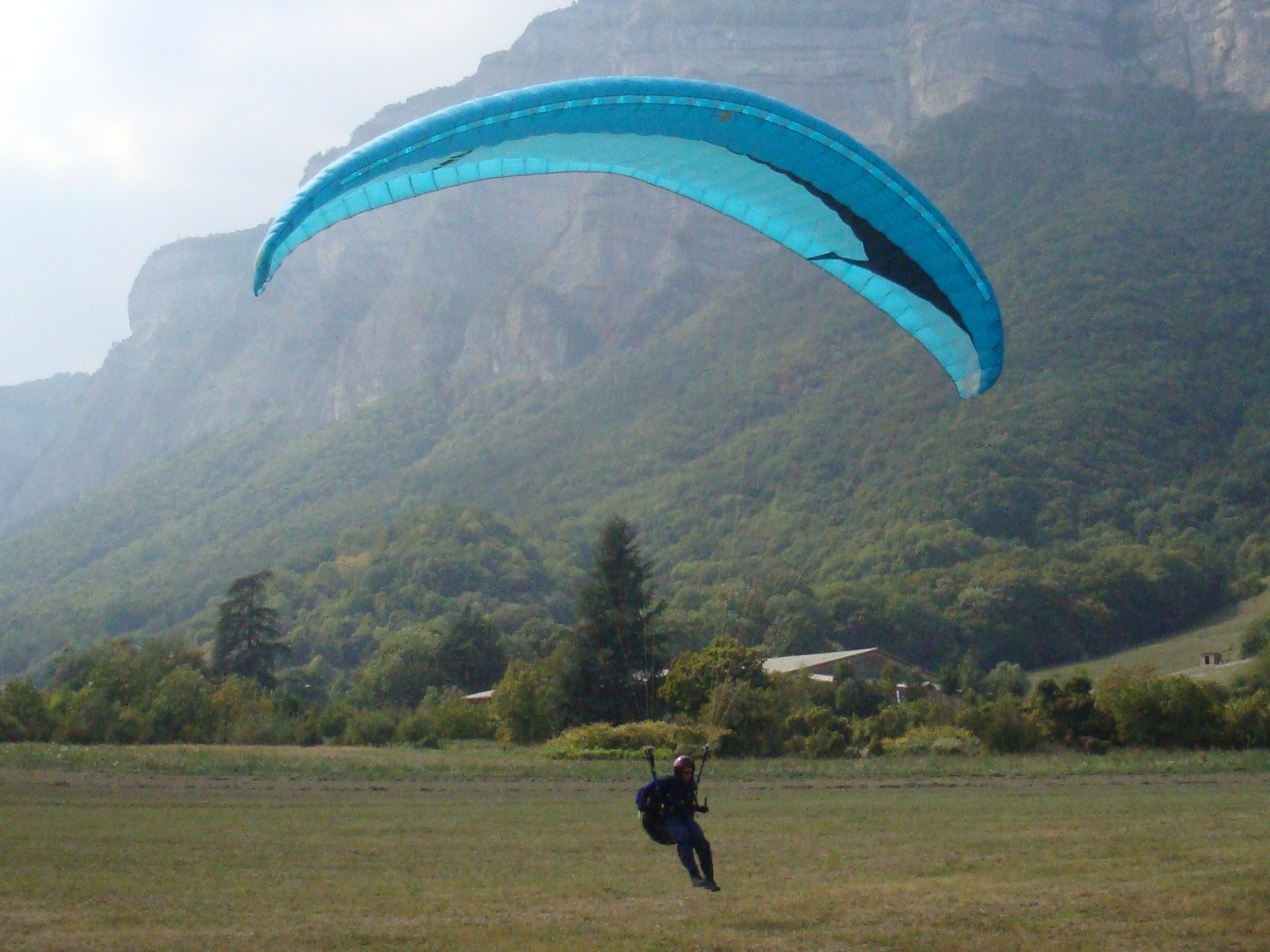
Apco Allegra paraglider

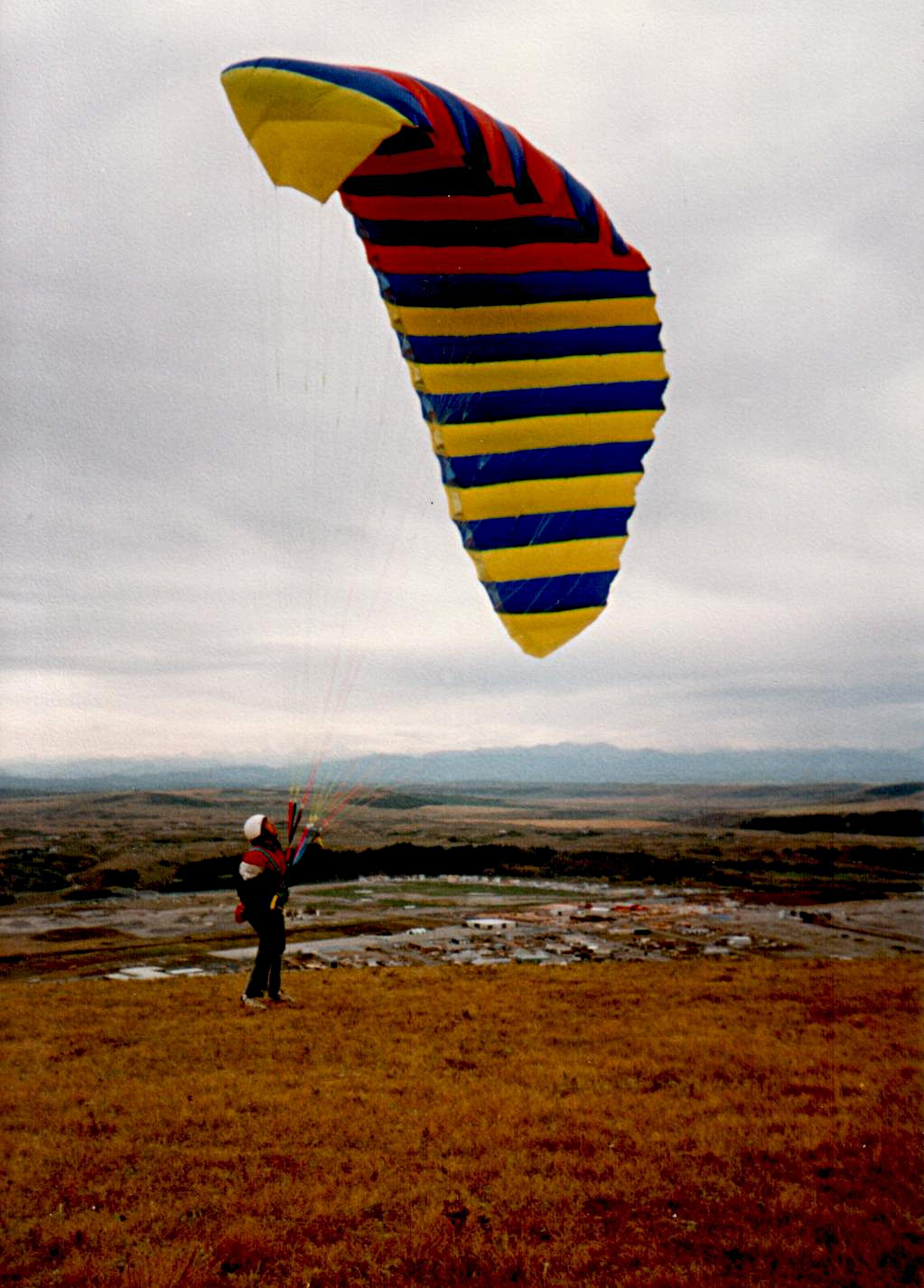
Apco Activa paraglider

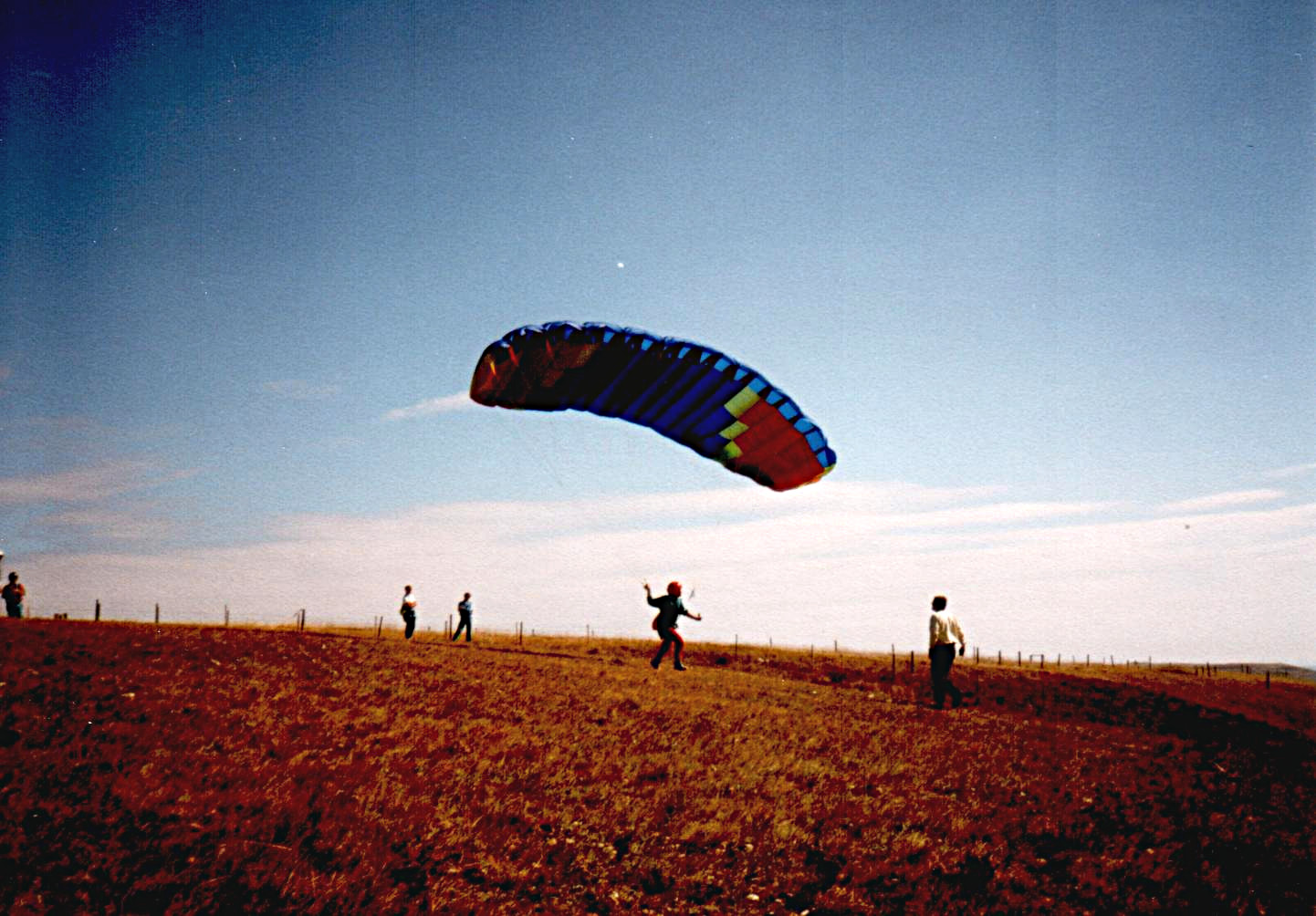
Apco Speedstar paraglider
