= Amphibian Airplanes of Canada =

- Company type: Privately held company
- Industry: Aerospace
- Founded: 1998
- Founder: Hans Schaer
- Headquarters: Squamish, British Columbia, Canada
- Products: Kit aircraft
- Website: www.seastaramphibian.com

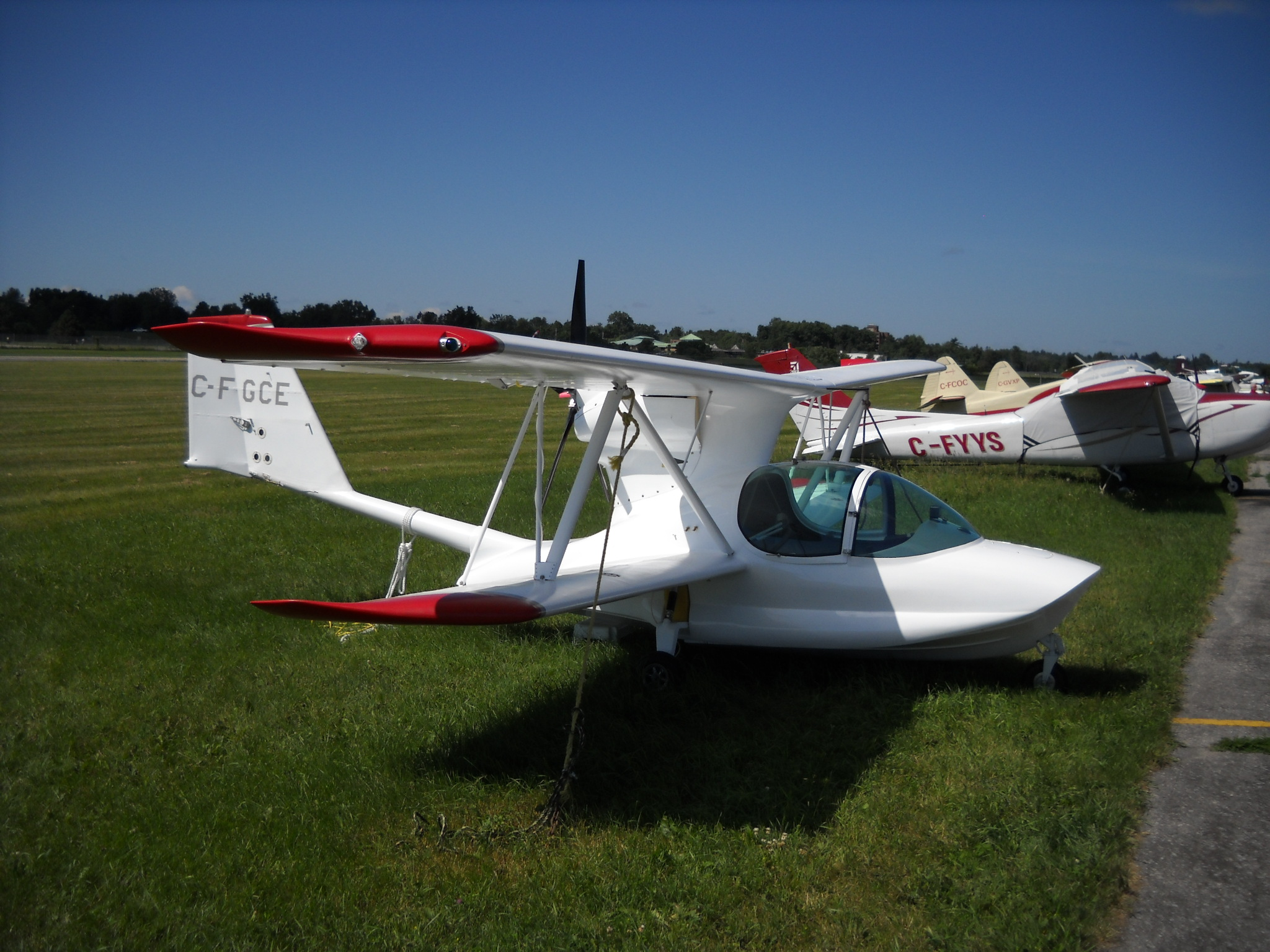
AAC SeaStar

Amphibian Airplanes of Canada (AAC) is a developer and marketer of light amphibious aircraft based in Squamish, British Columbia.

AAC was established by Hans Schaer in Squamish, British Columbia in 1998 to develop a light amphibious aircraft to be marketed for homebuilding.

== Aircraft ==
- AAC SeaStar
- AAC Seastar Sealoon
