= Aerosport Inc =

Aerosport Inc was a company founded by Harold Woods in Holly Springs, North Carolina in 1971 to market aircraft and plans for homebuilding.

== List of products ==
Aerosport Quail
(1971) Single-engine high-wing one-seat ultralight monoplane aircraft with tricycle undercarriage and enclosed cabin
Aerosport Rail
(1970) Monoplane one-seat ultralight aircraft with two pusher engines and open cabin
Aerosport Scamp
(1973) Single-engine one-seat ultralight biplane aircraft with tricycle undercarriage and open cabin
Aerosport Woody Pusher
(1960s) Single-engine two-seat parasol ultralight monoplane aircraft with open cockpit and tailwheel undercarriage
Aerosport-Rockwell LB600
A piston engine for ultralight aircraft, based on a snowmobile engine (in partnership with Rockwell International).
