= Wolfgang Klemperer =

Aviation and aerospace scientist and engineer

Wolfgang B. Klemperer
- in Blaue Maus glider 1923 with Anthony Fokker
- Born: January 18, 1893; Dresden, German Empire
- Died: March 25, 1965 (aged 72); California, US
- Occupations: aerospace engineer and designer.
- Spouse: Maria N. Englemann (m. 1932–1965)
- Children: 2

Dr. Wolfgang Benjamin Klemperer (January 18, 1893 – March 25, 1965) was born in Dresden, Germany, the son of the Austrian nationals Leon and Charlotte Klemperer. He was in his time a prominent aviation and aerospace scientist and engineer, who ranks among the pioneers of early aviation.

He is probably best known for his work on Properties of Rosette Configurations of Gravitating Bodies in Homographic Equilibrium, which have been named after him as Klemperer rosettes.

Klemperer was engaged in the development of rigid airships or Zeppelins, both in Germany and the US, high altitude ballons, specialized optics, a high-speed wide-angle cine-camera, analogue computers, equipment for data processing, and flight simulators. He became the preeminent missile scientist of Douglas Aircraft Corporation and in 1958 the director of the guided missile research section, staff assistant to the vice-president, and director of product development.

Throughout his career he published regularly, often with his first and middle names abbreviated to W. B. Klemperer, in scientific magazines on aerodynamics, space flight and navigation, as well as sailplanes.

In 1962 he published his work on the Klemperer rosette.

== European years ==
Klemperer grew up in the city of Dresden, where he also attended school. After graduating from grammar school, he enrolled at Dresden Institute of Technology. At the outbreak of World War 1 in 1914, being an Austrian National, he served his military service in the Austro-Hungarian Aviation Troops.

After the war in 1918 he continued his studies at Dresden University of Technology (TU Dresden) and graduated there in 1920 as Dipl.-Ingenieur.

In 1920 he joined the Aachen Aerodynamics Institute as an assistant to Professor Theodore von Kármán, who later became the founder of the Jet Propulsion Laboratory (JPL). Alongside his academic career he also worked from 1922 to 1924 for Dr. Hugo Junkers at his glider plane manufacturing plant Aachener Segelflugzeugbau in Aachen, Germany.

From 1922 to 1924, he worked at Luftschiffbau Zeppelin, Friedrichshafen in Germany, as head of research. Here he was involved in the development of zeppelins and was able to assemble a body of research around wind-tunnel experiments on air loads and moments acting on airships in curved flight and when moored, which formed the basis of his doctorate thesis.

In 1924 he earned his doctorate in engineering from Aachen Institute of Technology.

== Life in the United States ==
Also in 1924 Klemperer emigrated to the US, where he joined Goodyear-Zeppelin Corporation in Akron, Ohio. The Zeppelin Airship Company, Friedrichshafen held a 66% stake in this company at the time. Here Klemperer was involved in the designs for the US Navy requisition for two large Zeppelins, the USS Akron and USS Macon. It can be seen from the production photographs that the same rigid frame technology was employed in the construction of these airships as in the German built Zeppelins, which represented the state of the art for these huge airships at the time. In 1928 the US Navy ordered the airships with a contract value of US$8 Million from Goodyear-Zeppelin Corporation. Since 1917 Goodyear Zeppelin was also a manufacturer of balloons and so Klemperer became involved with the US Army's Stratospheric Research Project, which, undertaken in 1934–1935, launched high altitude balloons to research the atmosphere in the upper atmosphere.

From 1936 onwards Klemperer worked for Douglas Aircraft Company, Santa Monica, California, to develop a pressure cabin for civil aircraft (first application in the DC-6). Klemperer was initially loaned to Douglas from the Goodyear-Zeppelin Corporation for this project which lasted until 1939.

During the years of World War 2 he was engaged in the development of optical and other instrumentation as the head of an instrumentation research group. His special talent for instrument design resulted in the development of a high-speed wide-angle cine-camera, analogue computers, equipment for data processing, and flight simulators. In time his department at Douglas Aircraft Corp. grew into the guided missile division and he became one of the preeminent missile scientists in the US. Some of the projects he oversaw resulted in the Nike, Sparrow, Honest John, and Thor missile programs.

In 1958 he became director of the guided missile research section, staff assistant to the vice-president, and director of product development.

His gift for theoretical analysis led him in later years into the realm of space navigation, where he and his colleagues made valuable contributions. His work on orbital navigation caused him to look at the properties of orbital bodies and ultimately to his insights into the Klemperer rosettes.

Dr. W. B. Klemperer stayed at Douglas Aircraft Corporation until the end of his life in 1965.

== A pioneer of flight ==
In 1912, while he was still at school, aged only 19, he started to develop and build his first motor plane, a tail-first aircraft powered by a 55 horsepower (41 kW) radial engine. This aeroplane came into service in 1914 in the town of Altchemnitz and was, due to the outbreak of World War 1 (1914–1918), quickly forgotten. During this war he served in the Austro-Hungarian Aviation Troops, where he was able to acquire vast experience in flight and gained his pilots license of the FAI (No 2702 Austria).

After the war, due to the restrictions posed by the Treaty of Versailles, Germany was banned from developing and building powered aeroplanes. Consequently, the Aachen Aerodynamics Institute had to concentrate on unpowered flight and therefore sailplanes and gliders. In order to fly and thereby test theories and observe their viability, some avid flying enthusiasts among the students founded in 1920, with Klemperer at the helm, the Academic Gliding Club, which still exists today. Klemperer was also working for Junkers Aachener Segelflugzeugbau, a glider manufacturer, which used the results obtained in the academic research in its designs. The result of the efforts is a glider based on a Junkers low-wing-monoplane aircraft design with airfoil wings called "Schwatze-Düvel" ("black devil" in Aachen dialect). Klemperer, competing at the Rhön-Rossitten Gesellschaft gliding competition with this glider, scored a distance record at his first attendance in 1920 with a flight of 2.2 kilometres (1.4 mi). The following year in 1921, with an improved design called "Blaue Maus", he surpassed with 13 min flight time the previous duration record set in 1911 by Orville Wright when the Wright Glider soared at the Atlantic coast in a 40 miles per hour (64 km/h) wind, more or less stationary for over 9 min. As a consequence he was granted his gliding certificate, issued by the Association of German Model & Soaring Flight Clubs, with the serial No. 1, being the very first glider certificate ever issued worldwide.

After his promotion and emigration to the US in 1924 he continued with his passion for gliding or soaring flight. Soon after his arrival in the US he founded a gliding group. He made his first long-distance flight on the first high-performance sailplane ever built in the US. From the foundation of the Soaring Society of America he was for many years its director and honorary vice president. He was chairman of the Southern Californian Soaring Association and later its honorary president. As chief engineer of planning and operations to the Sierra Wave Project he did fundamental research into standing-wave phenomena.

== Scientific projects ==
The following list shows a most likely non-complete list of Klemperer's scientific projects and co-operations. There may have been others, which the author was unable to find. If a reader is aware of any more, feel free to amend.

Year	Collaboration Partners	Project	Purpose	Klemperer's Role
1934–1935	National Geographic – U.S. Army Air Corps	stratospheric balloon experiments		
Winter 1951–1952 & Spring 1955	U.S. Air Force, Southern California Soaring Society, Air Force Cambridge Research Center, and the Meteorology Department at the University of California at Los Angeles (UCLA)	Sierra Wave Project	investigate standing-wave phenomena	Chief Engineer of Planning and Operations
1963	National Geographic Society – Douglas Aircraft Corporation	APEQS – Aerial Photography of the Eclipse of the Quiet Sun	Aerial Astronomy during a solar eclipse	Scientific Director
