= List of gliders (F) =

This is a list of gliders/sailplanes of the world, (this reference lists all gliders with references, where available) Note: Any aircraft can glide for a short time, but gliders are designed to glide for longer.

== F ==
=== FAG Chemnitz ===
(Flugtechnischen Arbeitsgemeinschaft der Staatlichen Akademie für Technik – Chemnitz)

- FAG Chemnitz C-1
- FAG Chemnitz C-2
- FAG Chemnitz C-3
- FAG Chemnitz C-4
- FAG Chemnitz C-5
- FAG Chemnitz C-6
- FAG Chemnitz C-7
- FAG Chemnitz C-8
- FAG Chemnitz C-9
- FAG Chemnitz C-10
- FAG Chemnitz C-11

=== FAG Esslingen ===
(Flugtechnischen Arbeitsgemeinschaft der Staatlichen Akademie für Technik – Esslingen)

- FAG Esslingen E-01
- FAG Esslingen E-02
- FAG Esslingen E-03
- FAG Esslingen E-04
- FAG Esslingen E-05
- FAG Esslingen E-06
- FAG Esslingen E-07
- FAG Esslingen E-08
- FAG Esslingen E-09
- FAG Esslingen E-10
- FAG Esslingen E-11
- FAG Esslingen E-12
- FAG Esslingen E-14

=== FAG Stettin ===
(Flugtechnischen Arbeitsgemeinschaft der Staatlichen Akademie für Technik – Stettin)

- FAG Stettin 4

=== FAR Musachevo ===
(FAR Musachevo)

- FAR Musachevo Yastreb – ВСР Мусачево Ястреб
- FAR Musachevo Komet

=== Farman ===
(Henry Farman)

- Farman Aviette
- Farman Moustique
- Farman Sport-P

=== Farner ===
(Hans U. Farner / Aviafiber / Canard Aviation AG / Hans U. Farner & Heinrich Bucher / Bucher Leichtbau)

- Farner HF Colibri 1 SL
- Aviafiber Canard 2FL
- Bucher Canard 2FL - Bucher Leichtbau
- Canard Aviation Canard SC
- Canard Aviation Canard SCM

=== Farner ===
(Willy Farner)

- Farner WF-1
- Farner WF-2
- Farner WF-23P
- Farner WF-3
- Farner WF-5 Elmer Citro
- Farner WF-6
- Farner WF-7
- Farner WF-8

=== Farrar ===
(Demetrius F. Farrar Jr.)

- Farrar LSG-1 Bird Flight Machine
- Farrar V-1 Flying Wing
- Farrar XI

=== Fasola ===
(Néstor A. Fasola)

- Fasola NF-1
- Fasola NF-2
- Fasola NF-3 Beta
- Fasola-Crego Vector

=== Fauvel ===
(Charles Fauvel)

- Fauvel AV.1
- Fauvel AV.2
- Fauvel AV.3
- Fauvel AV.7
- Fauvel AV.10
- Fauvel AV.14
- Fauvel AV.17
- Fauvel AV.22
- Fauvel AV.221
- Fauvel AV.222
- Fauvel AV.28
- Fauvel AV.29
- Fauvel AV.30
- Fauvel AV.31
- Fauvel AV.32
- Fauvel AV.33
- Fauvel AV.35
- Fauvel AV.36
- Fauvel AV.361
- Fauvel AV.37
- Fauvel AV.42
- Fauvel AV.44
- Fauvel AV.45
- Fauvel AV.451
- Fauvel AV.46
- Fauvel AV.48
- Fauvel AV.50
- Fauvel AV.60
- Fauvel AV.61

=== FAB ===
(Flugtechnische Arbeitsgemeinschaft an der Ingenieurschule Beuth)

- FAB 3 – Flugtechnische Arbeitsgemeinschaft an der Ingenieurschule Beuth

=== Fage ===
(Jacques Fage)

- Fage Dédale

=== Farrar-McFarlane ===
(D. J Farrar & L.G. McFarlane)

- Farrar-McFarlane biplace –

=== Favier ===
(L. Favier)

- Favier LF-3

=== Fabris (glider constructor) ===
(Fabris / Gabardini di Cameri)

- Febo Paglierini

=== Ferber ===
(Ferdinand Ferber)

- Ferber P-1
- [[Ferber N° 1 1898]]
- [[Ferber N° 2 1899]]
- [[Ferber N° 3 1899]]
- [[Ferber N° 4 1901]]
- Ferber N° 5 1902
- Ferber N° 5 1903
- Ferber N° 5 1904
- [[Ferber N° 6 1905]]

=== FFA ===
(Thomas Bircher & Jürg Von Voomfeld / Flug- und Fahrzeugwerke Altenrhein AG)

- FFA Diamant 18
- FFA Diamant
- FFA HBV
- FFA Diamant 16.5
- FFA N-20.1 Arbalette - (Herbert Wiehl / Flug- und Fahrzeugwerke Altenrhein)

=== Fibera ===
(Ahto Anttila / Fibera)

- Fibera KK-1e Utu

=== Fisher-Boretzki ===
(Hans Fischer & Boretzki)

- Fisher-Boretzki Fibo 2a

=== Fizir-Mikl ===
(Rudolf Fizir & Josef Mikl)

- Fizir-Mikl glider

=== FFG Hannover ===
(Flugtechnische FachGruppe an der Technischen Hochschule Hannover)

- Akaflieg Hannover AFH-04
- Akaflieg Hannover AFH-10

=== Flachsmann ===
(Karl Flachsmann)

- Flachsmann F-1
- Flachsmann F-2
- Flachsmann F-5

=== Flight Dynamics ===
(Flight Dynamics Inc.)

- Flight Dynamics Seasprite
- Flight Dynamics Flightsail

=== Florida ===
(Florida University)

- Florida BDG-1

=== FMA ===
- Ae, for "Dirección General de Aerotécnica", on the first period (1927–1936);
- F.M.A., for "Fábrica Militar de Aviones", on the second period (1938–1943);
- I.Ae., for "Instituto Aerotécnico", on the third period (1943–1952);
- IA, meaning not specified

=== Focke-Wulf ===
- Focke-Wulf Kranich III

=== Fokker ===
(Fokker Flugzeug-Werke G.m.b.H)

- Fokker 1909 Spider glider
- Fokker V.30
- Fokker V.42
- Fokker 1919 single-seat biplane glider
- Fokker 1922 single-seat biplane glider
- Fokker two-seat biplane glider – 1922 Wasserkuppe
- Fokker D-8 (de-engined D.VIII)
- Fokker FG-1 – 1919
- Fokker FG-2 – 1922
- Fokker FG-3 – 1922
- Fokker FG-4 – 1922

=== Ford ===
(Gilbert Ford)

- Ford 1930 Primary
- Ford Bluey

=== Fournier ===
(Avions Fournier SA / René Fournier / Société Alpavia)

- Fournier RF-2
- Fournier RF 3
- Fournier RF 4 (motor glider)
- Fournier RF 5 (motor glider)
- Fournier RF-7 (motor glider)
- Fournier RF-9 (motor glider)
- Fournier RF-10 (motor glider)

=== Frankfort ===
(Frankfort Sailplane Company / Stanley Corcoran)

- Frankfort Cinema I
- Frankfort Cinema II
- Frankfort Cinema II Glider B
- Frankfort TG-1
- Frankfort XCG-1
- Frankfort XCG-2

=== Franklin ===
(Franklin Glider Corporation)

- Franklin Primary
- Franklin 9491
- Texaco Eaglet
- Franklin PS-2
- Franklin-Stevens PS-2
- Stevens SU-1
- Stevens-Franklin – Stevens Institute of Technology / Roswell Earl Franklin
- Franklin TG-15
- Franklin TG-17

=== Frati ===
(Stelio Frati / Aeroclub de Busto Arsizio, Varese)

- Frati BF-46

=== Free Flight ===
(Free Flight Aviation Pty. Ltd.)

- Free Flight Hornet 130s

=== Freel ===
(Charles L. Freel / San Diego High School)

- Freel Flying Wing

=== Freiherr von Lüttwitz ===
- Freiherr von Lüttwitz glider

=== FTAG Esslingen ===
(Flugtechnische Arbeitsgemeinschaft an der Fachhochschule Esslingen -Hochschule für Technik e.V.)

- Esslingen E-2 a.k.a. FTAG E-2
- Esslingen E-3 a.k.a. FTAG E-3
- Esslingen E-4 a.k.a. FTAG E-4
- Esslingen E-8 a.k.a. FTAG E-8
- Esslingen E-9 a.k.a. FTAG E-9
- Esslingen E-11 a.k.a. FTAG E-11
- Esslingen E-12 a.k.a. FTAG E-12
- Esslingen E-14 a.k.a. FTAG E-14

=== Fukuda ===
(Fukuda Kei Hikoki Seisakusho - Fukuda light Aeroplane Manufacturing Works)

- Fukuda Ki-24
- Fukuda Ki-26
- Fukuda Hikara-6-I
- Fukuda Hikari Research-2 Motor Glider
- Fukuda/Hitachi HT-3 Research Glider

=== Fulda ===
(Modell-und Segelflugverein Fulda)

- Fulda Fulda
- Fulda Erlkönig

=== Funk ===
(Otto & Peter Funk)

- Funk HS203
- VFW-Fokker FK-3
- VFW-Fokker FK-5
- Funk Sirius 1
- Akaflieg Karlsruhe AK-1 (FK-4)
- Funk FK-1 Greif-1a
- Funk FK-1 Greif-1b
- Funk FK-2 Greif 2
- Funk FK-3
- Funk FK-4
- Funk FK-5
- Funk FK-6
- Funk FK-7
- Funk FK-8

=== FVA ===
(Flugwissenschaftliche Vereinigung Aachen)

- Fulda-Aachen Eva – Klemperer, Wolfgang – Flugwissenschaftliche Vereinigung TH Aachen und Modell- und Segelflugverein, Fulda
- FVA-1 Schwatze Düvel (Schwarzer Teufel)
- FVA-2 Blaue Maus
- FVA-3 Ente
- FVA-04 Pipö
- FVA-5 Rheinland
- FVA-07 M 1a
- FVA-08 MS II
- FVA-9 Blaue Maus 2
- FVA-10A Theodor Bienen
- FVA-10B Rheinland
- FVA-11 Eifel
- FVA-12
- FVA-13 Olympia Jolle
- FVA-14 Ringflügel
- FVA-15
- FVA-16 Schaumstoff-Flügel
- FVA-17 Nurflügler
- FVA-20 F. B. Schmetz
- FVA-27

=== FVD ===
(Flugtechnischer Verein Dresden – H. Muttray & R. Siefert)

- Dresden Stehaufchen
- Dresden Doris
- Dresden D-B03
- Dresden D-B04
- Dresden D-B05
- Dresden D-B06
- Dresden D-B07
- Dresden D-B08
- Dresden D-B09
- Dresden D-B10

=== Flugtechnische Verein Stuttgart|FVS ===
(Flugtechnische Verein Stuttgart / Paul Brenner & Martin Schrenk) Also see Akaflieg Stuttgart

- FVS 4 - 1921 monoplane school glider Designed by Paul Brenner, head of FVS

- Stuttgart I
- Akaflieg Stuttgart I

- FVS Fox- 1922 monoplane school glider Designed by Brenner & Martin Schrenk

- Stuttgart II
- Akaflieg Stuttgart II
