= Fauvel =

Fauvel is a surname and may refer to:

- 11849 Fauvel, a minor planet
- Louis-François-Sébastien Fauvel (1758–1753), French painter, diplomat and archaeologist.
- Albert-Auguste Fauvel (1851–1909), French naturalist
- Charles Adolphe Albert Fauvel (1840–1921), French entomologist
- Charles Fauvel (1904–1979), French aircraft designer
  - Fauvel AV.22
  - Fauvel AV.36
  - Fauvel AV.44
  - Fauvel AV.45
  - Fauvel AV.48
  - Fauvel AV.50
  - Fauvel AV.61
- John Fauvel (1946–2001), British historian of mathematics
- Pascal Fauvel (1882–1942), French archer
- Pierre Fauvel (1866–1958), professor of zoology at the Catholic University of the West
- Pierre Fauvel (physician) (1830–1895)
- William LeBoutillier Fauvel (1850–1897), merchant and political figure in Quebec

== See also ==
- Roman de Fauvel, a 14th-century French allegorical poem
- Francis Fauvel Gouraud (1808–1847), contributor to the development of the Mnemonic major system as it is known today
