= Fauvel AV.46 =

French motor glider project

AV.46

General information
- Type: Tail-less two-seat motor-glider project
- National origin: France
- Designer: Charles Fauvel

The Fauvel AV.46 was a (AV for aile volante (transl. flying wing) was a 2-seat tail-less motor-glider designed, but not built, in France. The AV.46 was derived from the single-seat Fauvel AV.45, fitted with a dual tandem cockpit similar to the Fauvel AV.22.

== Specifications ==
Data from

General characteristics

- Crew: 2
- Length: 4.28 m (14 ft 1 in) including elevator
- Wingspan: 17.1 m (56 ft 1 in)
- Wing area: 23.75 m^{2} (255.6 sq ft)
- Empty weight: 290 kg (639 lb)
- Gross weight: 490 kg (1,080 lb)
- Powerplant: 1 × small air-cooled piston engine , 33 kW (44 hp) to 50 hp (37 kW)
- Propellers: 2-bladed pusher propeller

Performance

- Maximum glide ratio: 30:1 power off
- Rate of sink: 0.78 m/s (154 ft/min) power off
- Lift-to-drag: 30
