= Su-1 =

Su-1 or SU-1 may refer to:

- Sukhoi Su-1, prototype fighter
- SU-1 SPG prototype based on the Soviet T-26 chassis, see T-26 variants
- Stevens SU-1, glider
