= SB1 =

SB1, SB 1, SB.1, SB-1, or SB>1 may refer to:

- SB1, a single-lined spectroscopic binary star
- SB1, the Sabino 1 coat color pattern gene found in some, but not all varieties of Sabino horses
- SB1, a shorthand designation of Soldier Boy I, a fictional superhero in The Boys franchise
- Senate Bill 1, a 2006 California legislative bill which expands the role of the California Solar Initiative
- Senate Bill 1, Road Repair and Accountability Act, a 2017 California legislative bill
- Tupolev SB-1, another name for the Tupolev SB, a 1930s Russian bomber
- Short SB.1, a 1951 British experimental tailless glider
- Sikorsky/Boeing SB-1 Defiant, also SB>1, an American experimental compound helicopter
- Stinson SB-1 Detroiter, a 1921 American utility aircraft
- Loessl Sb.1 Münchener Eindekker, a 1921 German experimental glider
- SB1, a breaststroke classification in disability swimming, see S1 (classification)
