= Fauvel AV.3 =

Single-seat French glider, 1933

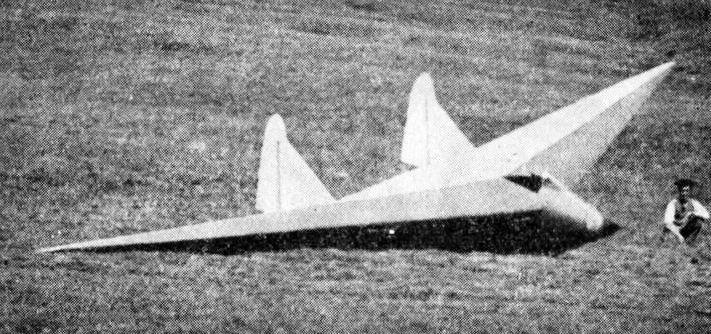

General information
- Type: Flying wing
- National origin: France
- Manufacturer: Guerchais and Caudron
- Designer: Charles Fauvel
- Number built: 1

History
- First flight: 1933

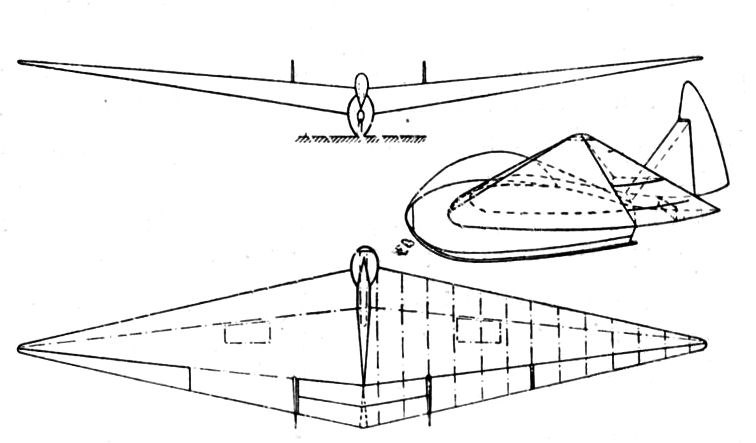
3-view

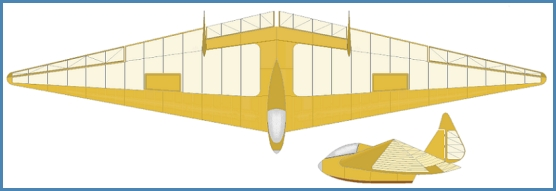
colour profile drawing

The Fauvel AV.3 (AV for aile volante (transl. flying wing) was a flying wing glider built in France in the early 1930s.

== Specifications ==
Data from

General characteristics

- Crew: One
- Length: 3.62 m (11 ft 11 in) including elevator
- Wingspan: 12.90 m (42 ft 4 in)
- Wing area: 20 m^{2} (220 sq ft)
- Aspect ratio: 19
- Airfoil: scaled, symmetric centre section; outer panels ST. Aé 230
- Empty weight: 107 kg (236 lb)

Performance

- Maximum speed: 250 km/h (160 mph, 130 kn)
