= Fauvel AV.60 =

French single seat sport aircraft, 1963

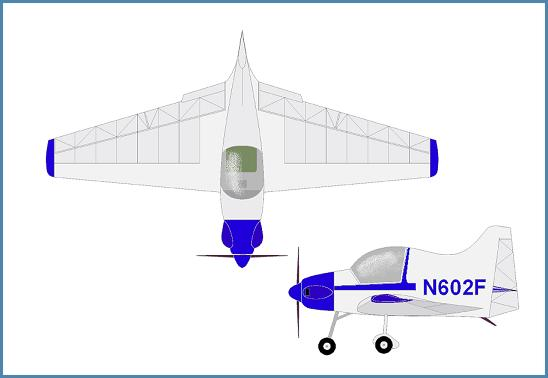

General information
- Type: Flying wing
- National origin: France
- Manufacturer: Guerchais and Caudron
- Designer: Charles Fauvel
- Number built: 1

History
- First flight: 14 July 1963

The Fauvel AV.60 (AV for aile volante (transl. flying wing) was a flying wing tourism aircraft built in France in the early 1960s. It was a low-wing monoplane of wooden construction, featuring a flying wing layout.

== Specifications ==
Data from

General characteristics

- Crew: One
- Length: 4.00 m (13 ft 1 in)
- Wingspan: 7.00 m (23 ft 0 in)
- Empty weight: 220 kg (485 lb)
- Gross weight: 350 kg (772 lb)
- Powerplant: 1 × Volkswagen 4-cylinder flat engine, 30 kW (40 hp)

Performance

- Maximum speed: 157 km/h (98 mph, 85 kn)
- Cruise speed: 128 km/h (80 mph, 69 kn)
