= Fauvel AV.31 =

General information
- Type: Flying wing
- National origin: France
- Designer: Charles Fauvel
- Number built: 0

History
- First flight: none

The Fauvel AV.31 was a design for a French flying wing airliner conceived by Charles Fauvel in the early 1940s.

== Design and development ==
The AV.31 was a giant transport plane with a wingspan of 295 feet (90 meters) and a take-off weight of 200 tonnes. All the passengers, fuel, and engines were situated in the wing, reducing the cockpit to a small nacelle in front of the wing. The passenger cabin, fully submerged in the wing, was 27 m long and 9 m wide, and could accommodate a variety of layouts. A bomber version was proposed as the AV.32.

To test the flight characteristics of the AV.31, Charles Fauvel proposed a 1/3 scale flying model, which would have been propelled by four 250 hp "Béarn" engines and had a span of 104 feet (32 m), a take-off weight of 8150 kg, and maximum speed of 354 km/h.

The AV.31, despite its great potential, did not leave the drawing board.

== See also ==
Aircraft of comparable role, configuration, and era

- Horten H.VIII

Related lists

- List of large aircraft
