= Fauvel AV.44 =

AV.44

General information
- Type: Sports plane
- Manufacturer: Homebuilt
- Designer: Charles Fauvel

The Fauvel AV.44 was a design for an unorthodox light aircraft produced in France in the 1970s. The work of Charles Fauvel, it was based on his pre-war AV.10 and like it, was a tailless monoplane with a reverse-delta planform and side-by-side seating in an enclosed cabin. The AV.44 featured considerably more modern aerodynamics and accommodation for two passengers in place of the AV.10's one. Five examples were under construction in 1977.

== Specifications (as designed) ==
Data from Jane's all the world's aircraft, 1975-76

General characteristics

- Length: 5 m (16 ft 5 in)
- Wingspan: 10.7 m (35 ft 1 in)
- Wing area: 19.8 m^{2} (213 sq ft)
- Aspect ratio: 5.8
- Empty weight: 340 kg (750 lb)
- Gross weight: 604 kg (1,332 lb)
- Max takeoff weight: 681 kg (1,501 lb)
- Powerplant: 1 × Continental O-200 4-cyl. air-cooled horizontally-opposed piston engine, 75 kW (100 hp) (typical)
- Propellers: 2-bladed wooden fixed pitch propeller

Performance

- Maximum speed: 210 km/h (130 mph, 110 kn) at sea level
- Cruise speed: 190 km/h (120 mph, 100 kn) at sea level
- Endurance: 5 hours 30 minutes
- Rate of climb: 1.3 m/s (260 ft/min)
