= Aviafiber Canard 2FL =

Canard 2FL

General information
- Type: sailplane
- Manufacturer: Aviafiber
- Designer: Hans Farner

History
- First flight: 13 August 1978

The Aviafiber Canard 2FL was a one-person recreational aircraft of highly unusual design, designed and built in Switzerland during the late 1970s and early 1980s.

== Design and development ==
Variously described as a rigid-wing hang-glider or as a foot-launched sailplane, the Canard 2FL was the brainchild of Swiss aerodynamicist Hans Farner. Of fibreglass construction, it consisted of a tiny fuselage, just big enough to accommodate the pilot in a prone position, provided with doors in the bottom through which the pilot's legs could extend for takeoff and landing. A large canard was fitted at the nose (as the name suggests), and the main lifting surfaces were supported atop tall, V-shaped pylons which both generated lift and acted as vertical fins. Wings, pylons and canard have Wortmann FX-67-170 airfoil section.

A further development of the concept can be seen in the Canard Aviation Canard SC, the production version of the 2FL. During flight tests of the SC, from 23 July 1983, progress was accelerated by the use of an auxiliary 15 kW (20 hp) König SC 430 3-cyl. two-stroke radial engine mounted on a pylon between the V-struts and main-plane, driving a folding propeller. Results of flight testing with the engine running encouraged Farner and Bucher to design a dedicated motor-glider version as the Canard Aviation Canard SCM, powered by a 15–18 kW (20–24 hp) engine. Farner had previously designed a motor-glider using the 2FL concept as the Farner HF Colibri 1 SL, which first flew in 1979.

The designer, Hans Farner, was killed flying one of their aircraft, prompting business partners to withdraw the Canard 2FL, Canard SC and Canard SCM from sale, buying back the small number that had already been sold.

== Variants ==
- Aviafiber Canard 2FL
- Farner HF Colibri 1 SL
- Canard Aviation Canard SC
- Canard Aviation Canard SCM

== Specifications ==
Data from

General characteristics

- Crew: 1
- Length: 4.5 m (14 ft 9 in)
- Wingspan: 13.5 m (44 ft 3 in)
- Wing area: 13 m^{2} (140 sq ft)
- Airfoil: Wortmann FX-67-170
- Empty weight: 50 kg (110 lb)

Performance

- Never exceed speed: 100 km/h (62 mph, 54 kn)
- Maximum glide ratio: 31
- Rate of sink: 0.6 m/s (120 ft/min)
