= Fauvel AV.29 =

General information
- Type: Flying wing transport
- National origin: France
- Designer: Charles Fauvel
- Number built: 0

History
- First flight: none

The Fauvel AV.29 was a design for a transport plane by Charles Fauvel in the late 1930s.

== Design ==
The AV.29, a small two-engine tourism/transport aircraft, to be powered by two Régnier 4F.0 engines was also intended to be a flying scale model for the two-seat AV.29 C2 fighter (M for Maquette - model). The much larger AV.29 C2 two-seat fighter was planned to use either, 14-cylinder Gnome-Rhône 14M Mars radial engines or 12-cylinder Hispano-Suiza 12Y engines. However, the AV.29, in both forms, remained a paper project only.

== Variants ==
Data from:Charles Fauvel and his Flying Wings

AV.29M
Projected 4-seat tail-less touring aircraft powered by two Régnier 4F.0 engines
AV.29 C2
Much enlarged 12.48 m (40.9 ft) span two-seat fighter, to have been powered by a 14-cylinder Gnome & Rhône Mars radial engines or 12-cylinder Hispano-Suiza 12Y engine.

== Specifications (AV.29M) ==
Data from Charles Fauvel and his Flying Wings

General characteristics

- Crew: 1
- Capacity: 3 pax
- Length: 4.44 m (14 ft 7 in) including elevator
- Wingspan: 10.96 m (35 ft 11 in)
- Wing area: 19.96 m^{2} (214.8 sq ft)
- Empty weight: 786 kg (1,733 lb)
- Gross weight: 1,143 kg (2,520 lb)
- Powerplant: 2 × Régnier 4F.0 12-cylinder radial piston engines, 100 kW (140 hp) each

Performance

- Maximum speed: 330 km/h (210 mph, 180 kn)
- Cruise speed: 295 km/h (183 mph, 159 kn)
- Minimum speed: 92 km/h (57 mph; 50 kn)
- Service ceiling: 9,300 m (30,500 ft)
- Rate of climb: 8.8 m/s (1,730 ft/min)
