= Fauvel AV.2 =

Single-seat French motor glider, 1932

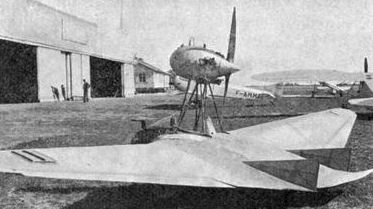

General information
- Type: Flying wing
- National origin: France
- Manufacturer: Guerchais and Caudron
- Designer: Charles Fauvel
- Number built: 1

History
- First flight: 1932

The Fauvel AV.2 (AV for aile volante (English: flying wing) was the first Fauvel type to fly, completed in 1932.

== Design and development ==
According to his own account, the idea of a flying wing aircraft came to Fauvel in July 1928 during a discussion of the design of high performance gliders; the central aim was to cut down drag to near the limit set by the lift induced drag of the wing by minimising other components. The best possible aircraft should avoid everything but the wing. In 1929 experiments were made with a model of his initial design, known as the AV.1, in the wind tunnel at the aeronautical laboratory at Saint-Cyr to check lift, drag and stability. He built his first full-size aircraft in collaboration with Louis Peyret. It could be flown as a glider or powered with a 15 kW (20 hp) engine. Peyret had no spare man-power in his factory and a deal was struck with the Société Makhonine. Initially it was intended that the AV.2 should be built by Guerchais at Saint Cloud but after their closure construction was taken over by Caudron and a more powerful engine fitted.

The AV.2 was almost entirely wing. Constructed around a single main spar, with an auxiliary spar to carry the ailerons, it was a wooden structure with plywood skin from the main spar forward around the leading edge forming a D-box. The rest was fabric covered. There was a thick centre section, which occupied about 20% of the span but more than 33% of its area, and outer panels with marked taper and dihedral.

In the absence of a rudder, the AV.2's pilot controlled yaw by differentially operating two pairs of airbrakes, each mounted near a wing tip and opening above and below the wing. The outer panels also carried ailerons. The only vertical surfaces on the wing were two fixed triangular fins, intended to reduce turbulence at each end of the unusual elevator designed by Peyret, mounted on the trailing edge of the centre section. It consisted of two geometrically similar surfaces, each of symmetrical section and joined to each other and to the wing without a gap. In plan the rear surface, though shorter, blended smoothly into the forward one. Together they formed a control surface with adjustable curvature, which could modify the profile of the centre section from symmetric to reflex. The pilot's controls were conventional; the airbrakes were controlled with a rudder bar which when rotated raised them differentially and when pressed forward opened them together as brakes. The ailerons and elevator operated by the usual control column. His seat was in an open cockpit at the leading edge of the wing, where a brief, rounded, enclosed forward extension carried a windscreen and pitot tube.

The AV.2 was powered by a 24 kW (32 hp) ABC Scorpion flat twin engine arranged in pusher configuration and driving a two blade propeller. It was contained in a tear-shaped pod that also held the fuel and oil tanks, mounted over the cockpit on a mast of steel tubes. It had a low, wide track tailskid undercarriage with its mainwheels semi-recessed into the centre section where it began to thin towards the outer panels. There were wheel brakes, operated like the airbrakes by forward pressure on the rudder bar, which came into operation when the airbrakes were more than half extended.

The AV.2 was completed in 1932.

== Specifications ==
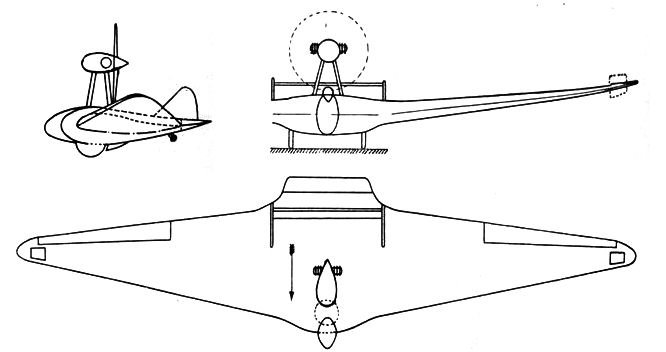
Fauvel AV.2 3-view drawing from L'Aerophile October 1933

Data from Hauet (2001), p.290 Performance figures estimated.

General characteristics

- Crew: One
- Length: 3.60 m (11 ft 10 in) including elevator
- Wingspan: 12.85 m (42 ft 2 in)
- Wing area: 20 m^{2} (220 sq ft)
- Aspect ratio: 8.3
- Airfoil: scaled, symmetric centre section; outer panels ST. Aé 230.
- Empty weight: 243 kg (536 lb)
- Gross weight: 345 kg (761 lb)
- Powerplant: 1 × ABC Scorpion flat twin, 25 kW (34 hp) at 2,300 rpm. Engine in pusher configuration.
- Propellers: 2-bladed

Performance

- Maximum speed: 140 km/h (87 mph, 76 kn)
- Cruise speed: 120 km/h (75 mph, 65 kn)
- Stall speed: 51 km/h (32 mph, 28 kn)
- Service ceiling: 5,000 m (16,000 ft)
- Landing speed: 40 km/h (25 mph; 22 kn)
