= Fauvel AV.7 =

1930s French aircraft

General information
- Type: Flying wing seaplane
- National origin: France
- Designer: Charles Fauvel
- Number built: 0

History
- First flight: none

The Fauvel AV.7 was a design for a twin-hull seaplane by Charles Fauvel in the early 1930s.

== Design ==
The AV.7 was a three-engine flying boat project, with a twin-hull configuration similar to that of the Savoia-Marchetti seaplanes of Italy. Conceived in May 1932, it had three engines on top of the wing, and with a design range of ~5,000 km (3,100 mi). However, the AV.7 did not proceed beyond the drawing board. Likewise, a single-hull trimotor design, the AV.9, remained a paper project.

== Specifications ==
Data from Charles Fauvel and his Flying Wings

General characteristics

- Crew: 1
- Length: 7.20 m (23 ft 7 in) including elevator
- Wingspan: 17.60 m (57 ft 9 in)
- Wing area: 54.70 m^{2} (588.8 sq ft)
- Empty weight: 1,840 kg (4,057 lb)
- Gross weight: 3,650 kg (8,047 lb)
- Powerplant: 3 × de Havilland Gypsy III air-cooled inverted in-line piston engines, 101 kW (135 hp) each
- Propellers: 2-bladed pusher propellers

Performance

- Maximum speed: 220 km/h (140 mph, 120 kn)
- Cruise speed: 190 km/h (120 mph, 100 kn)
- Range: 5,000 km (3,100 mi, 2,700 nmi)
- Service ceiling: 3,800 m (12,500 ft)
