= Fauvel AV.17 =

Single-seat French glider, 1946

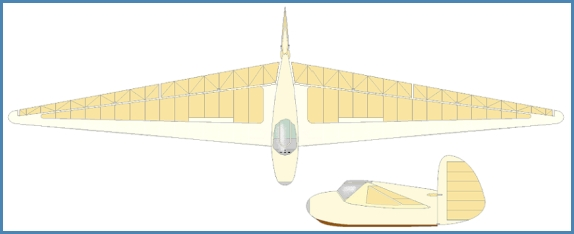

General information
- Type: Flying wing
- National origin: France
- Manufacturer: Guerchais and Caudron
- Designer: Charles Fauvel
- Number built: 1

History
- First flight: 1946

The Fauvel AV.17 (AV for aile volante (transl. flying wing) was a flying wing glider built in France in the late 1940s.

== Specifications ==
Data from

General characteristics

- Crew: One
- Length: 4.75 m (15 ft 7 in) including elevator
- Wingspan: 15.00 m (49 ft 3 in)
- Wing area: 17.30 m^{2} (186.2 sq ft)
- Aspect ratio: 27
- Airfoil: scaled, symmetric centre section; outer panels ST. Aé 230
- Empty weight: 195 kg (430 lb)

Performance
