= F.V.D. Doris =

German single-seat glider, 1922

Doris

General information
- Type: Single-seat glider
- National origin: Germany
- Manufacturer: Flugtechnischer Verein Dresden (F.V.D.)
- Designer: Horst Muttray and Reinhold Seiferth
- Number built: 1

History
- First flight: 1922

The F.V.D. Doris or Dresden Doris, later known as the Akaflieg Dresden D-B2 Doris, was a monoplane glider built in Germany in 1922. It was unusual in having wings which could independently adjust their angles of attack, a feature intended to increase the energy acquired from gusts of wind.

== Design and development ==
After the collaboration between the Technical High School Dresden (TH Dresden) and the local flying club, the Flugtechnischer Verein Dresden (F.V.D.), that led to the quite successful 1921 F.V.D. Stehaufchen wing warping biplane glider, the group designed and built a monoplane, the Doris. Originally known as the Dresden Doris or, in the UK at least, as the F.V.D. monoplane, it was later incorporated retrospectively into the Akaflieg Dresden's design list as the D-B2 Doris. Most notably, it had wings which could adjust their relative angles of attack independently both of each other and of the pilot.

The idea of such wings came from the poor understanding of slope soaring in the early 1920s and from observations of bird flight, where wings were seen to twist independently. It was hoped that such freedom could better capture the energy of the gusts that were thought to be the source of slope lift. An early glider of this type had been built by Erich Offermann before World War I and some theoretical work done by Albert Betz and, independently, R. Knoller, began to reach an understanding of how a plunging airfoil could generate thrust (the Knoller-Betz effect). By about 1920 Friedrich Harth was convinced this was essential for extended glider flight and the Harth-Messerschmitt designs were controlled in pitch by a variable angle of incidence wing and roll by wing warping. Its pilot had two levers, one for roll and the other for pitch. The 1921 Loessl Sb.1 Münchener, which won two first and one second prizes at the second Rhön (Wasserkuppe) gliding contest, extended the idea with wings that could be independently rotated with a single, conventional control column, doing away with the wing warping. Ten of the fifty-three competing aircraft at the third Rhön contest, held in 1922, had variable incidence wings but as slope soaring was better understood and the high control forces needed appreciated, rigid wings with ailerons for roll control became standard on gliders.

The Doris was a high-wing monoplane using a thick, highly cambered Göttingen 441 airfoil, braced from the lower fuselage on each side by a wide spread inverted V pair of struts connected to the wing at about 30% of the span, immediately below the single main wing spar on which the wing rotated. This was at about 40% chord, where the wing was thickest. The spars were mounted over the fuselage on a narrow central faired column. The wing was largely fabric covered but from the spar forward it was plywood skinned around the leading edge on the upper side, though the ply did not extend as far aft on the underside. The extreme tips were also ply covered.

The fuselage of the Doris had a wooden frame girder structure with a rectangular cross section, tapering aft to a horizontal wedge. Forward of the wing trailing edge it was ply covered, with fabric covering elsewhere. At the nose the sides curved round smoothly and there was also rounded decking immediately ahead of the open cockpit, which was under the leading edge with the vertical front face of the wing support column against the pilot's back. The rear edge of the column dropped gradually away from the trailing edge to the upper fuselage. The angles of incidence were adjusted from the control column via pushrods, sideways movement rotating the wings in opposite directions to roll. Fore and aft movement decreased and increased the angles of incidence together. The intention was that in level flight the pilot should largely allow the wings to follow their optimum setting by themselves. In addition there was a tailplane trim lever, originally fixed to the control column. The high aspect ratio, all-moving tailplane was nearly rectangular in plan apart from angled tips and was fabric covered behind its leading edge. The Doris was a short aircraft and its vertical tail was therefore large, with a quadrant shaped fin and a near rectangular rudder which had a small cut-away at its base for tailplane movement. The vertical tail surfaces were fabric covered. Like the Stehaufchen, the Doris had a pair of horizontal landing skids. These were fixed to the fuselage at the nose and mounted on the ends of a pair of transverse, arched ash brackets on rubber shock absorbers.

== Operational history ==
The Doris took part in the 1922 Rhön contest, though Flight noted that it "does not appear to have accomplished very much". It remained on the Wasserkuppe after the competition but crashed, injuring Muttray. The accident, which badly damaged the Doris, was partially ascribed to the unfamiliar control column mounted tailplane trim lever, so when the glider was rebuilt this control was relocated further back in the cockpit. After the rebuild, completed in November 1922, the Doris flew from the Dresden club's airfield at Geising in the Ore Mountains. Some decent but unexceptional flights were made.

== Specifications ==
Data from Historische Deutsche Flugzeuge bis 1945

General characteristics

- Crew: One
- Length: 5.30 m (17 ft 5 in)
- Wingspan: 12.20 m (40 ft 0 in)
- Wing area: 15.5 m^{2} (167 sq ft)
- Aspect ratio: 9.5
- Airfoil: Göttingen 441
- Empty weight: 118.5 kg (261 lb)
- Gross weight: 195 kg (430 lb)
- Wing loading: 12.6 kg/m^{2} (2.6 lb/sq ft)

Performance

- Maximum glide ratio: 14.5
