= Fournier RF 3 =

French motor glider, 1963

Fournier RF-3
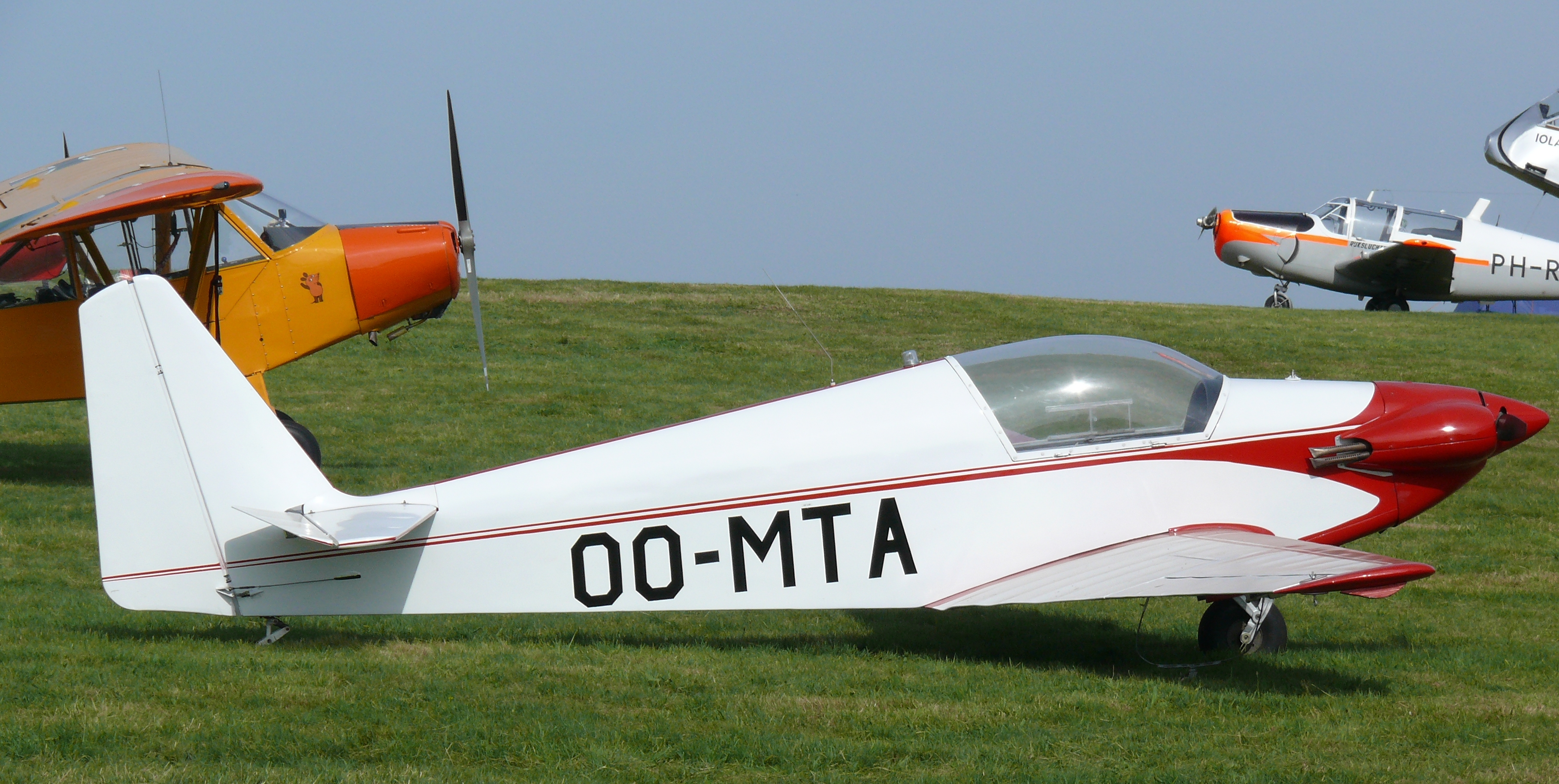
- Belgian-registered RF-3 in 2012

General information
- Type: motor glider
- National origin: France
- Manufacturer: Societé Alpavia
- Designer: René Fournier
- Number built: 1 (RF-1); 2 (RF-2); 89 (RF-3)

History
- First flight: 1963 (RF-3)
- Variant: Fournier RF 4

The Fournier RF-3 is a single-seat motor glider designed by René Fournier and first flown in 1960.

== Design and development ==
Fournier produced the Volkswagen-powered RF-1 single-seat motor-glider with a high-aspect ratio low-mounted wing, registered F-WJGX it first flew on 6 July 1960. Fournier followed it with an improved variant, the RF-2 using a Rectimo AR.1200 engine, the first of two-built, with the help of Centre Est, first flew in June 1962.

Fournier started a company Societé Alpavia to manufacture a production variant of the RF-2, named the RF-3. The first RF-3 was exhibited at the June 1963 Paris Air Show. Series production commenced later that year.

An aerobatic variant with a strengthened airframe was produced as the Fournier RF 4.

== Variants ==
RF-1
Prototype Avions Planeur first flown in 1960, one built.
RF-2
Improved variant, first flown in 1962, two built.
RF-3
Production variant first flown in 1963, 89 built by Alpavia at Gap-Tallard.

== Specifications (RF-3) ==
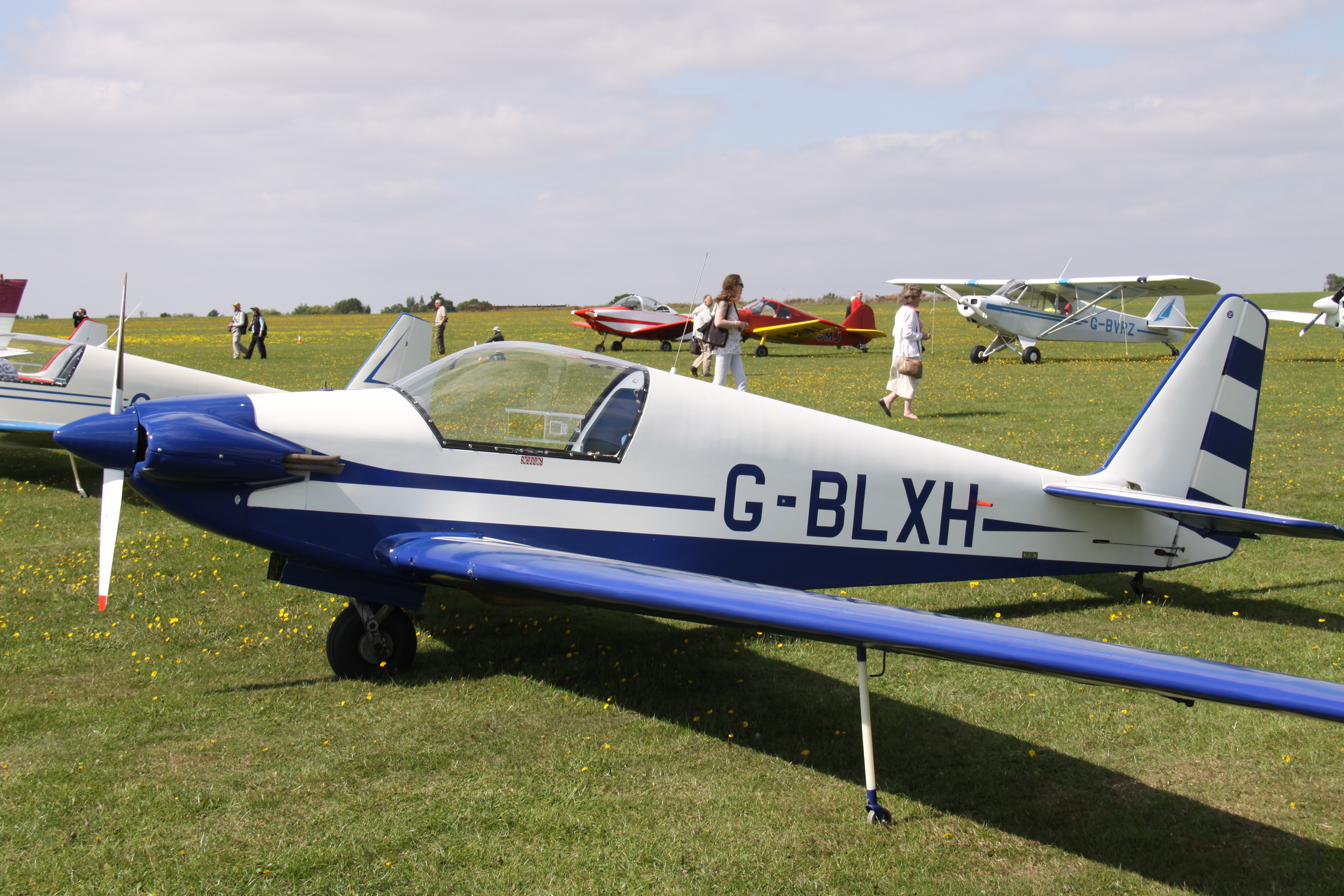
A 1964-built RF-3 attending the 2013 LAA Rally at Sywell Aerodrome

Data from Jane's All The World's Aircraft 1965–66

General characteristics

- Crew: 1
- Length: 6.00 m (19 ft 8 in)
- Wingspan: 11.20 m (36 ft 9 in)
- Wing area: 11.0 m^{2} (118 sq ft)
- Aspect ratio: 11.4:1
- Airfoil: NACA 23015 at root, NACA 23012 at tip
- Empty weight: 240 kg (529 lb)
- Max takeoff weight: 350 kg (772 lb)
- Fuel capacity: 30 L (6.6 imp gal; 7.9 US gal)
- Powerplant: 1 × Rectimo air-cooled horizontally-opposed four-cylinder piston engine, 29 kW (39 hp)

Performance

- Maximum speed: 190 km/h (120 mph, 100 kn)
- Cruise speed: 160 km/h (99 mph, 86 kn) (econ cruise)
- Stall speed: 70 km/h (43 mph, 38 kn)
- Never exceed speed: 270 km/h (170 mph, 150 kn)
- Range: 500 km (310 mi, 270 nmi)
- Service ceiling: 5,800 m (19,000 ft)
- Rate of climb: 4.0 m/s (790 ft/min)
- Rate of sink: 1.20 m/s (236 ft/min) (engine off)
- Take-off run to 15 m (50 ft): 270 m (886 ft)
- Landing run from 15 m (50 ft): 230 m (755 ft)
