= Fauvel AV.42 =

AV.42

General information
- Type: Jet-powered tourism aircraft project
- National origin: France
- Designer: Charles Fauvel

The Fauvel AV.42 was a (AV for aile volante (transl. flying wing) tail-less tourism cabin monoplane designed, but not built, in France.

== Specifications (AV.42) ==
Data from , Charles Fauvel and his Flying Wings

General characteristics

- Crew: One
- Capacity: 5 pax
- Length: 6.50 m (21 ft 4 in) including elevator
- Wingspan: 10.00 m (32 ft 10 in)
- Wing area: 19.7 m^{2} (212 sq ft)
- Powerplant: 3 × Turbomeca Palas turbojet, 1.6 kN (350 lbf) thrust each for take-off (note:centre engine for take-off and climb only)

Performance

- Maximum speed: 610 km/h (380 mph, 330 kn)
- Cruise speed: 500 km/h (310 mph, 270 kn)
- Range: 1,000 km (620 mi, 540 nmi) to 3,000 km (1,900 mi; 1,600 nmi)
