= Fauvel AV.28 =

General information
- Type: Flying wing fighter
- National origin: France
- Designer: Charles Fauvel
- Number built: 0

History
- First flight: none

The Fauvel AV.28 was a design for a fighter plane by Charles Fauvel in the late 1930s.

== Design ==
The AV.28 was conceived as a two-seat, off-center cockpit fighter design powered by two Gnome-Rhône 14M Mars engines. Armament consisted of two 20 mm (0.787 in) cannon and three 7.5 mm (0.295 in) Darne machine guns. Fauvel presented the AV.28 to the French Air Ministry in 1938, but the design was rejected. In April 1940, Fauvel proposed another off-center cockpit design, the three-seat AV.30, to be powered by Pratt & Whitney engines, featuring a centrally controlled hydraulic turret, but France's defeat in 1940 prevented it from being realized.

== Variants ==
Data from:

AV.28
Two-seat twin fuselage tail-less fighter, to have been powered by two Gnome-Rhône 14M Mars engines.
AV.30
Three-seat twin fuselage tail-less fighter, to have been powered by two Pratt & Whitney R-2800 Double Wasp engines.

== Specifications (AV.28) ==
Data from Charles Fauvel and his Flying Wings

General characteristics

- Crew: 2
- Length: 4.75 m (15 ft 7 in)
- Wingspan: 12.4 m (40 ft 8 in)
- Wing area: 26 m^{2} (280 sq ft)
- Powerplant: 2 × Gnome-Rhône 14M Mars 14-cylinder two-row air-cooled radial piston engines, 600 kW (800 hp) each

Performance

- Maximum speed: 670 km/h (420 mph, 360 kn)

Armament

- Guns: two 20 mm (0.787 in) cannon and three 7.5 mm (0.295 in) Darne machine guns
