= Fauvel AV.22 =

Two-seat French glider, 1956

AV.22
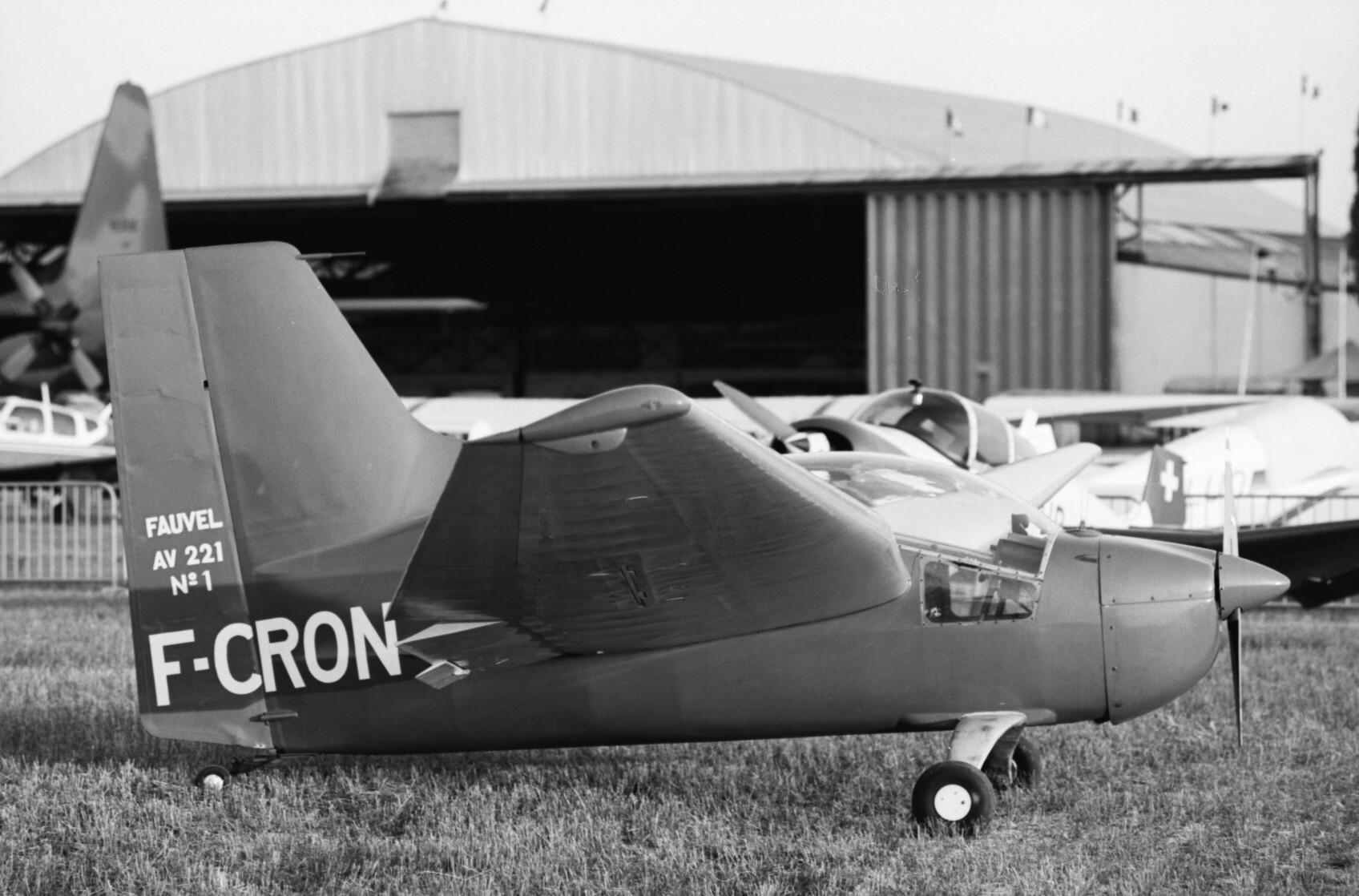
- An AV.221 motorglider

General information
- Type: Sailplane and motorglider
- Manufacturer: Homebuilt
- Designer: Charles Fauvel
- Number built: 6 (AV.22), 1x (AV.221), several (AV.222) under construction

History
- First flight: 5 April 1956

The Fauvel AV.22 was an unorthodox glider produced in France in the 1950s, 60s, and 70s. Originally intended to be produced in series, it was later marketed to homebuilders. Like other Charles Fauvel designs, it was a tailless aircraft, and this particular design featured wings with a slight forward sweep.

== Design and development ==
The original AV.22 design was unpowered, but later versions were equipped with an engine mounted in the nose for self-launching. The AV.22 was entered in a 1959 competition to select a standard glider for the French aeroclubs, but lost to the Wassmer Bijave.

The first powered version was the AV.221, which flew on 8 April 1965. In addition to the powerplant, the fuselage was also redesigned to accommodate a passenger side-by-side with the pilot. A simplified version of this aircraft was marketed for homebuilding as the AV.222, with options including a choice of airfoils, and either one or two wheel undercarriage.

== Variants ==
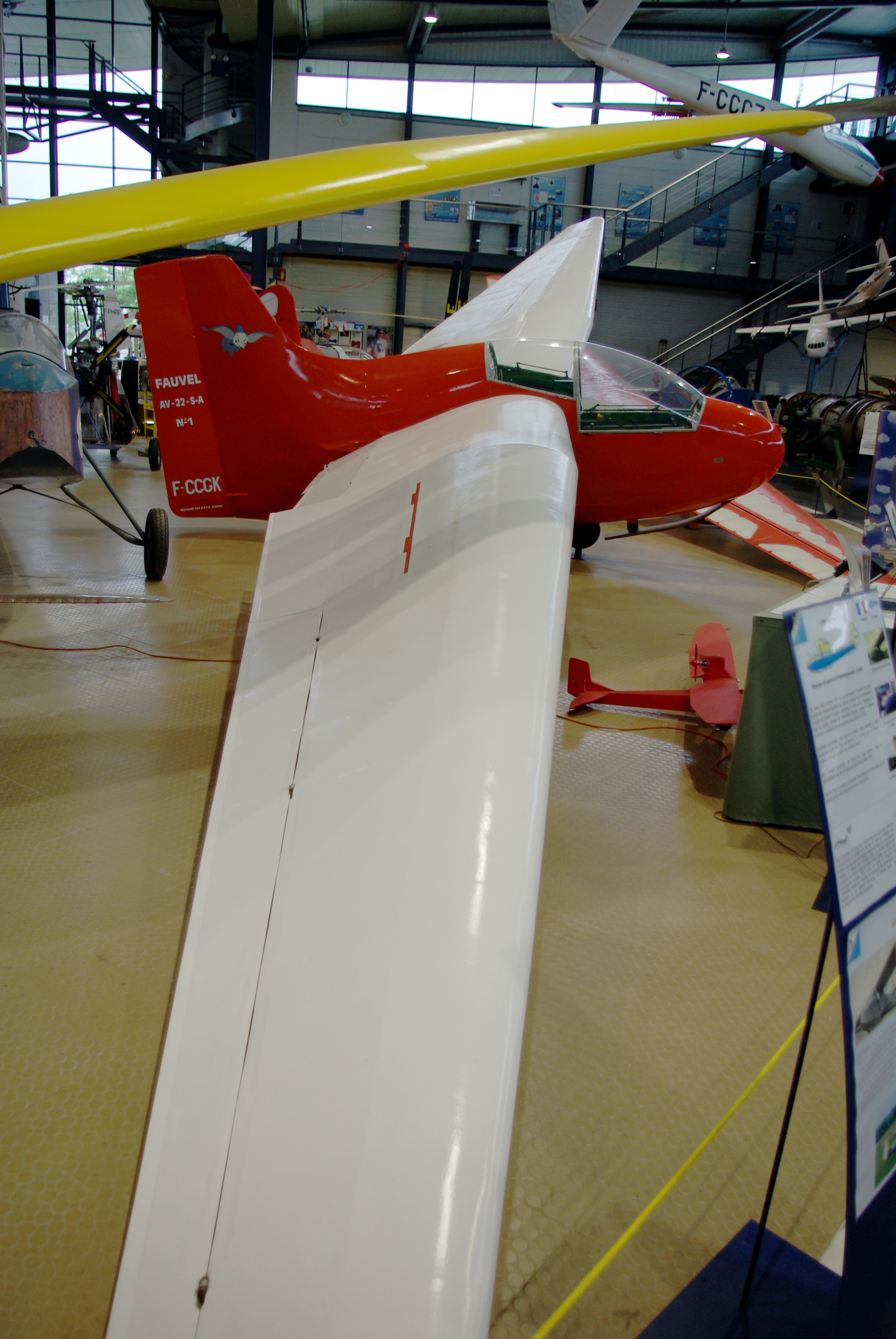
Fauvel AV-22 preserved at the Espace Air Passion museum, near Angers, France.

AV.22
Initial glider version;first flight 8 April 1956. Two prototypes and four production aircraft were built
AV.22S
Production version of the AV.22 glider.
AV.221
Two-seat motor glider, powered by a 28.7 kW (38.5 hp) Rectimo 4 AR 1200 engine.
AV.221B
A proposed variant powered by a 29.8 kW (40 hp) Survol - de Coucy "Pygmée" engine.
AV.222
Simplified AV.221 for homebuilding;first flight May 1992.

== Specifications (AV.22S / AV.222) ==
Data from The World's Sailplanes:Die Segelflugzeuge der Welt:Les Planeurs du Monde Volume II Nurflugel AV.22 Nurflugel AV.221 Nurflugel AV.222 Jane's World Sailplanes and Motor Gliders

General characteristics

- Crew: 2
- Length: 5.07 m (16 ft 8 in) - (AV.22S)

5.22 m (17 ft 2 in) - (AV.221)
5.22 m (17 ft 2 in) - (AV.222)

- Wingspan: 15.2 m (49 ft 10 in) - (AV.22S)

15.48 m (50 ft 9 in) - (AV.221)
16.4 m (53 ft 10 in) - (AV.222)

- Height: 1.48 m (4 ft 10 in) at cockpit
- Wing area: 21.75 m^{2} (234.1 sq ft) - (AV.22S)

21.75 m^{2} (234 sq ft) - (AV.221)
23.05 m^{2} (248 sq ft) - (AV.222)

- Aspect ratio: 10.6 - (AV.22S)

11 - (AV.221)
11.67 - (AV.222)

- Airfoil: F_{2} 17%
- Empty weight: 220 kg (485 lb) - (AV.22S)

325 kg (717 lb) - (AV.221)
350 kg (772 lb) - (AV.222)

- Max takeoff weight: 495 kg (1,091 lb) - (AV.221)

550 kg (1,213 lb) - (AV.222)

- Powerplant: 1 × Rectimo 4 AR 1200 4-cyl. horizontally opposed air-cooled piston engine, 28.7 kW (38.5 hp) (AV.222) (one of several engine types fitted)

Performance

- Maximum speed: 160 km/h (99 mph, 86 kn) - (AV.221)

210 km/h (130 mph; 113 kn) - (AV.222)

- Stall speed: 58 km/h (36 mph, 31 kn) - (AV.22S)

74 km/h (46 mph; 40 kn) - (AV.222)

- Never exceed speed: 170 km/h (110 mph, 92 kn) - (AV.22S)
- Rough air speed max: 157 km/h (98 mph; 85 kn) - (AV.22S)
- Aerotow speed: 160 km/h (99 mph; 86 kn) in smooth air - (AV.22S)
- Aerotow speed: 128 km/h (80 mph; 69 kn) in rough air - (AV.22S)
- Terminal velocity: with full air-brakes at max all-up weight 165 km/h (103 mph; 89 kn) - (AV.22)
- g limits: +8 -4 at 254 km/h (137.1 kn) - (AV.22S)
- Maximum glide ratio: 26:1 at 51.6 mph; 44.8 kn (83 km/h) - (AV.22S)

23 - (AV.221)
27 - (AV.222)

- Rate of climb: 3 m/s (590 ft/min) at sea level - (AV.222)
- Rate of sink: 0.84 m/s (165 ft/min) at 43.5 mph; 37.8 kn (70 km/h) - (AV.22S)

0.87 m/s (171.3 ft/min) - (AV.221)
0.9 m/s (177.2 ft/min) - (AV.222)

- Wing loading: 20.4 kg/m^{2} (4.2 lb/sq ft) - (AV.22S)

23.91 kg/m^{2} (4.89 lb/sq ft) - (AV.222)

== See also ==
Related development

- Fauvel AV.36
- Fauvel AV.45

Aircraft of comparable role, configuration, and era

- Brochocki BKB-1
- Marske Monarch
- Marske XM-1
- Marske Pioneer

Related lists

- List of gliders
