= Loessl Sb.1 Münchener Eindecker =

German single-seat glider, 1921

Sb.1 Münchener Eindecker
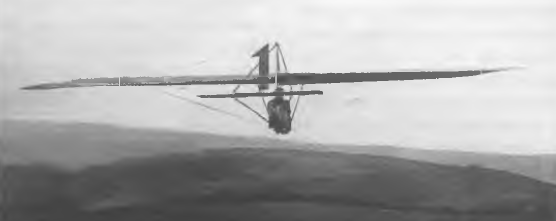

General information
- Type: Single-seat glider
- National origin: Germany
- Manufacturer: Bayern Aeroclub, Munich
- Designer: Ernst von Loessl and Albert Finsterwalder

History
- First flight: 1921

The Sb.1 Münchener Eindecker, Loessl Sb.1 Münchener Eindecker, (monoplane from Munich), was a high-wing single-seat glider with an unusual method of pitch and roll control. It won prizes at the second Rhön competition held on the Wasserkuppe in 1921.

== Design and development ==
The Sb.1 was designed by two engineering students from the Technical University of Munich, Ernst von Lößl/Loessl, (cousin of Eugen von Loessl killed at the Wasserkuppe on 9 August 1920) and Albert Finsterwalder. It was built by them with the assistance of the Munich branch of the Bayern Gliding Club during the winter of 1920–21. They were aware of the high-wing monoplane gliders that had been under development by Friedrich Harth, assisted by the teenage Willy Messerschmitt, since before 1915. By about 1920 Harth was convinced that long glider flights depended on energy capture from gusts (ridge and thermal lift was undiscovered) and the Harth-Messerschmitt designs were controlled in pitch by a variable angle of incidence wing and roll by wing warping. Its pilot had two levers, one for roll and the other for pitch. The tailplane was fixed. Lößl and Finsterwalder took these ideas a stage further by making the wings separately rotatable and controlled with a conventional column, which when moved sideways rotated the wings in opposite directions. The fixed tailplane was retained but the conventional fin and rudder of the Harth-Messerschmitt was entirely removed; instead, yaw was controlled by the opening above and below the wing of little wing tip trailing edge double split flap airbrakes. This last feature did not work well so the brakes were replaced by a conventional, rectangular rudder; this was further modified later by adding a triangular tip, forming a balanced rudder. At the same time a fixed fin was added.

The Sb.1 had an open frame fuselage. A beam less than about 1,900 mm (75 in) long served as a landing skid and supported the controls and the pilot's seat in front of a square cross-section fairing which converged in boat-tail fashion in plan and elevation to a point only a short distance aft of the skid. From the beam a pair of struts converged above the wing, the rear one almost vertical. Two pairs of steel tube struts, attached to the top and bottom of the rear upright, spread out into Vs to support the rectangular plan tailplane. The rest of the structure was wire-braced.

The glider had a wire-braced, wooden, two part, three spar wing with the first spar forming the leading edge and the second the axis of rotation. The wings had constant chord out to angled tips and a thick (16.7%) section. Like the tail surfaces, they were fabric covered. Each leading edge was linked by a short forward extension of the control column by a vertical, outward leaning pushrod providing rotations of up to ±10°.

== Operational history ==
The second Rhön competition, held in 1921, attracted 46 entries, many more than in the previous year. About half arrived at the Wasserkuppe and not all of these flew. Prizes were awarded for total time in the air (same pilot, duration more than 15 seconds), minimum loss of height in a flight lasting more than 60 seconds) and greatest distance flown. A grand prize for the greatest flight duration lasting more than 5 minutes with a specified maximum altitude loss was not awarded.

Flown by Karl Koller, the Munich aircraft was very successful and was awarded first prize in the height loss and distance flown categories. Koller's greatest distance in one flight was 4.08 km (2.54 mi). He was runner-up to Willi Pelzner in the duration category; Pelzner flew 57 flights on his own hang glider and 5 on the North-Baverian Aviation Society biplane. Nonetheless, Koller's total time of 31.6 minutes was made in only 25 flights and his average duration (76 seconds) was more than double that of the winner. The Hannover Vampyr would have out-flown the others had it not been damaged after only a few flights, as its post-competition performance demonstrated.

At the next Rhön there were fifty-three entrants, ten of which had wings with adjustable incidence angles, including a Harth-Messerschmitt monoplane and the F.V.D. Doris. The winner of the valuable Great Rhön Sailing Prize, the Hannover Vampyr which flew for over three hours, was not one of the ten.

== Specifications (Münchener Eindecker) ==
Data from Historische Deutsche Flugzeug bis 1945

General characteristics

- Crew: One
- Length: 4.66 m (15 ft 3 in)
- Wingspan: 11.00 m (36 ft 1 in)
- Wing area: 15.5 m^{2} (167 sq ft)
- Aspect ratio: 7.8
- Empty weight: 56 kg (123 lb)
- Gross weight: 131 kg (289 lb)
- Wing loading: 8.45 kg/m^{2} (1.73 lb/sq ft)

== See also ==
Related lists

- List of gliders
