= Fukuda Hikari Research-2 Motor Glider =

Research-2 Motor Glider

General information
- Type: Motor-glider
- National origin: Japan
- Manufacturer: Fukuda Light Aeroplane Manufacturing Works
- Designer: Keicho Yo
- Number built: 1

History
- First flight: 5 August 1941

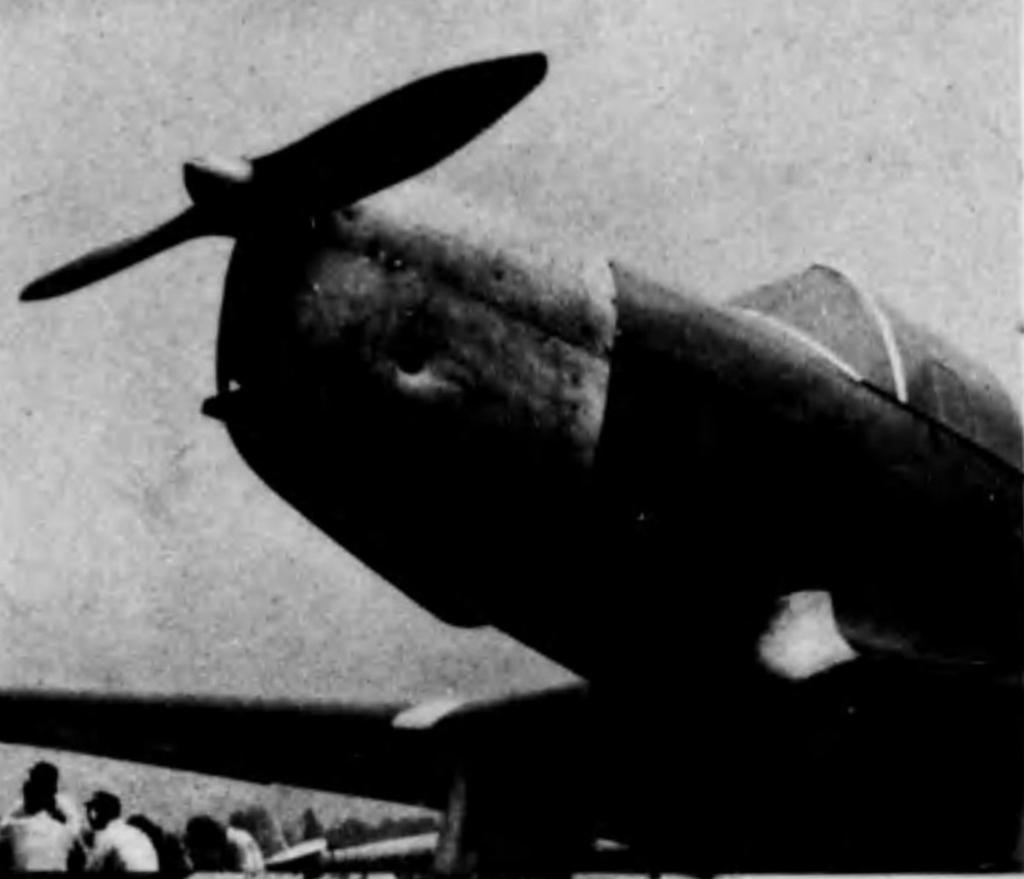
Fukuda Hikari Research-2 Motor Glider.

The Fukuda Hikari Research-2 Motor Glider was a Japanese civil design, which first flew in August 1941. Its gliding performance was encouraging, but its development ended as Japan entered World War II in December 1941.

== Design and development ==
In 1940, Fukuda received a request from the Aviation Board of Japan for a motor glider. The Fukuda Hikari Research-2 was completed in July 1941 and was the second Japanese motor glider, following the Nippon Hachi Motor Glider.

The Research-2 had a wooden structure throughout and was fabric covered. It was a conventional low wing monoplane with a fixed undercarriage, distinguished by its higher than average (13.75) aspect ratio wing, which was tetrahedral in plan with slightly blunted tips. Like many gliders, the Research-2's wing was equipped with spoilers.

It was powered by an aero-engine developed in the U.K. by Flying Squirrel, better known for their motorcycles, an air-cooled, inverted, twin cylinder inline two-stroke with an output of 16–28 hp (12–21 kW). Behind the engine the fuselage was rounded in section. The Research-2 was flown from an enclosed cockpit over the wing leading edge; the top of the cockpit glazing merged, unbroken, into the upper fuselage. The tail was also conventional, though the fuselage-mounted horizontal surfaces were well forward of the vertical tail, which had a tall but narrow fin and large unbalanced rudder.

Its faired landing legs were kept short by wing root stubs with anhedral, producing a mild, inverted gull wing.

== Operational history ==
The Research-2 was first flown on 5 August 1941. The pilot was Isamu Oda, an experienced flyer of both powered and unpowered aircraft. Subsequent tests showed better than calculated performance but later in the year Japan's involvement in the Second Sino-Japanese War broadened into the Pacific War, and civilian aircraft development ended.

== Specifications ==
Data from Japanese Aircraft 1910-1941

General characteristics

- Crew: one
- Length: 6.95 m (22 ft 10 in)
- Wingspan: 13 m (42 ft 8 in)
- Height: 1.70 m (5 ft 7 in)
- Wing area: 12.3 m^{2} (132 sq ft)
- Aspect ratio: 13.75
- Empty weight: 210 kg (463 lb)
- Gross weight: 300 kg (661 lb)
- Powerplant: 1 × Scott Flying Squirrel air-cooled, two cylinder inverted in-line two-stroke, 12–21 kW (16–28 hp)
- Propellers: 2-bladed wooden

Performance

- Maximum speed: 126 km/h (78 mph, 68 kn)
- Cruise speed: 89 km/h (55 mph, 48 kn)
- Landing speed: 61 km/h (38 mph; 33 kn)
- Maximum glide ratio: 18.6, at 70.9 km/h (44.1 mph; 38.3 kn)
- Time to altitude: 10.5 min to 1,000 m (3,300 ft)
- Absolute ceiling: 3,100 m (10,200 ft)
- Rate of sink: 1.03 m/s (203 ft/min) minimum, at 67.6 km/h (42.0 mph; 36.5 kn)
