= Franklin PS-2 =

American glider

PS-2
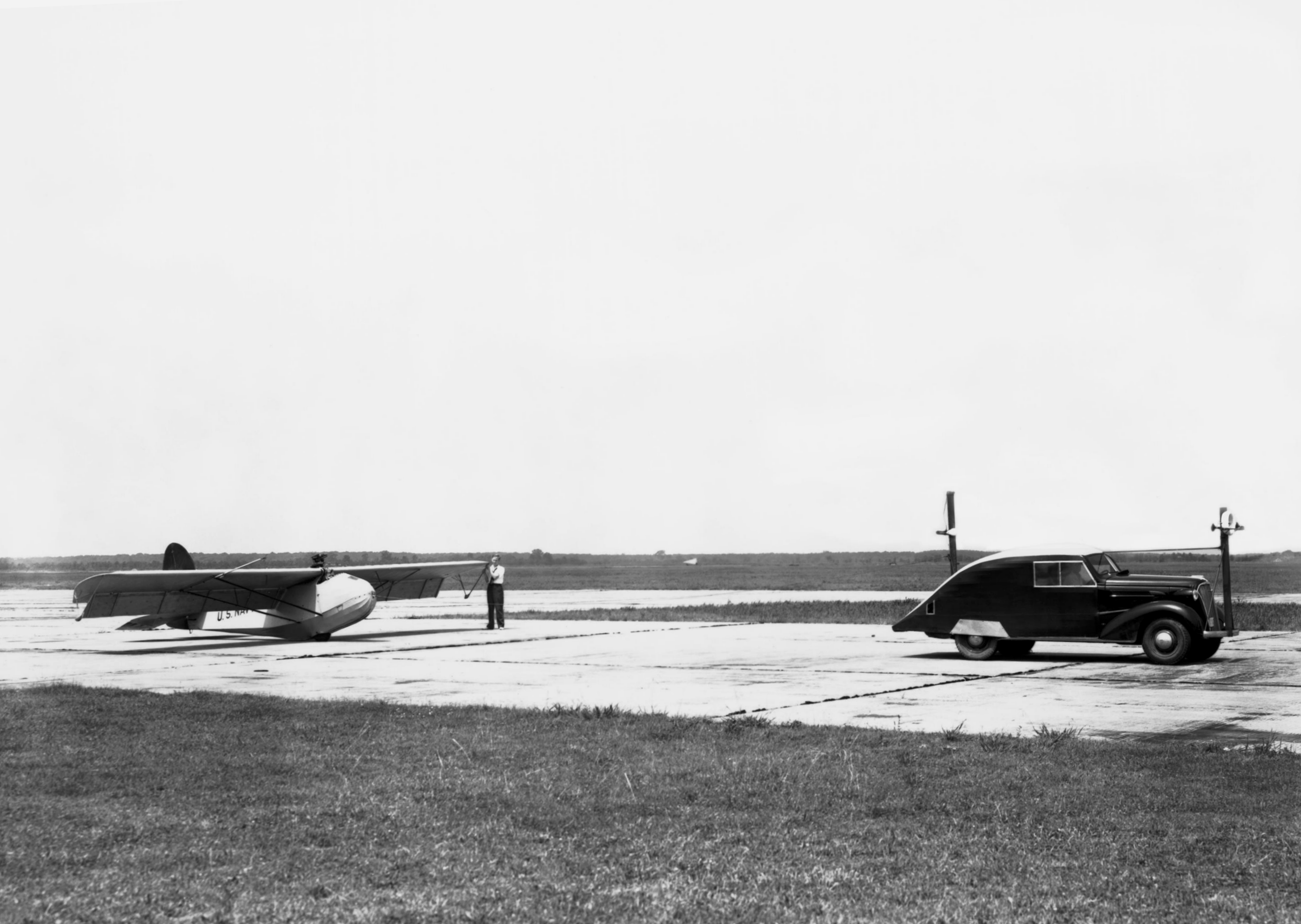
- Franklin PS-2 training glider is about to be towed aloft by the specially modified car in front.

General information
- Type: Glider
- National origin: United States
- Manufacturer: Franklin Glider Corporation
- Designer: R. E. Franklin

History
- Introduction date: 1930
- First flight: 1930
- Variant: Stevens SU-1

The Franklin PS-2 is an American, high-wing, strut-braced, single seat, glider that was designed by R. E. Franklin and produced by the Franklin Glider Corporation starting in 1930.

== Design and development ==
The prototype PS-2 was the 50-foot (15 m) wingspan Texaco Eaglet, flown in 1930. The production PS-2 had shorter 36 ft (11.0 m) wings.

The PS-2 is constructed with a steel tube fuselage and a wooden wing, all covered in doped aircraft fabric covering. The wings lack spoilers of other glide-path control devices and are supported by dual, parallel struts. The landing gear is a fixed monowheel and a skid.

== Operational history ==
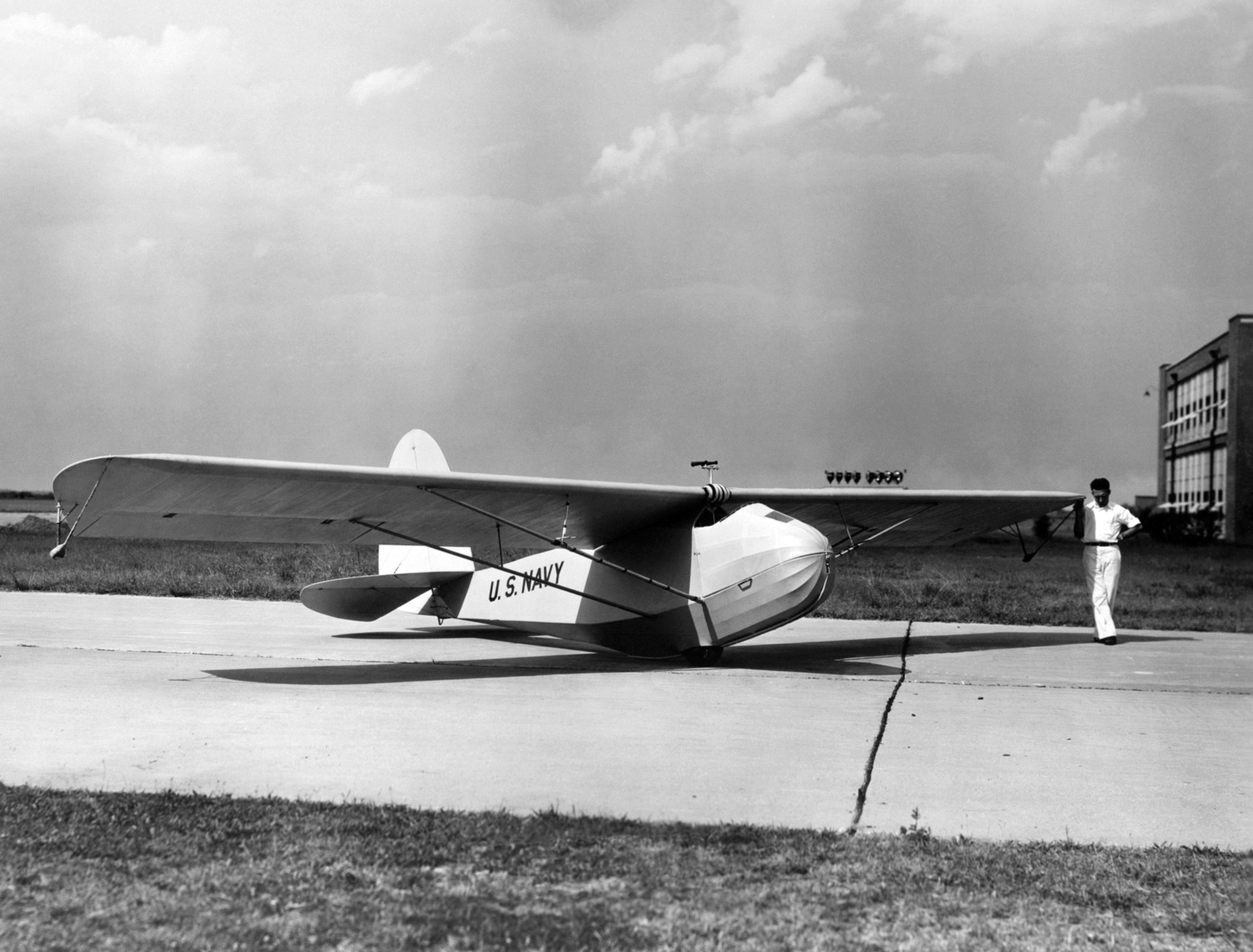
Franklin XPS-2

The prototype Eaglet performed a number of long tows, including one flown by Frank Hawks from California to Elmira, New York in 1930 and is now in the National Air and Space Museum.

In 1934, the PS-2 was the glider of choice for the Lustig Skytrain experiment. The concept was to tow three gliders in tandem, taking off from New York City and releasing one each over Philadelphia, Baltimore and Washington, D.C. The gliders were piloted by Jack O'Meara, PS-2 designer R.E. Franklin and Stan Smith. The Skytrain was intended to be a proof-of-concept for a future airline service, but was not pursued.

The PS-2 was also used in 1934 for a United States Navy primary flight training experiment in Pensacola, Florida, designed by Ralph Barnaby

The PS-2 was also flown by many early glider pilots including Richard Chichester du Pont, Warren Eaton, Floyd Sweet and Stan Smith.

In 1983, two were reported as being still flown and one was under restoration by the designer's son, Chuck Franklin. The Federal Aviation Administration had seven PS-2s registered in March 2011, including the Franklin-Stevens PS-2.

== Variants ==
Texaco Eaglet
Prototype with 50-foot (15 m) span wings
PS-2
Production model with a 36 ft (11.0 m) wingspan
Franklin-Stevens PS-2
Modified model
TG-15
United States Army Air Corps designation for eight PS-2 gliders impressed as training gliders in 1942.
TG-17
United States Army Air Corps designation for one PS-2 gliders impressed as a training glider in 1942 (serial number 42-57193).

== Aircraft on display ==
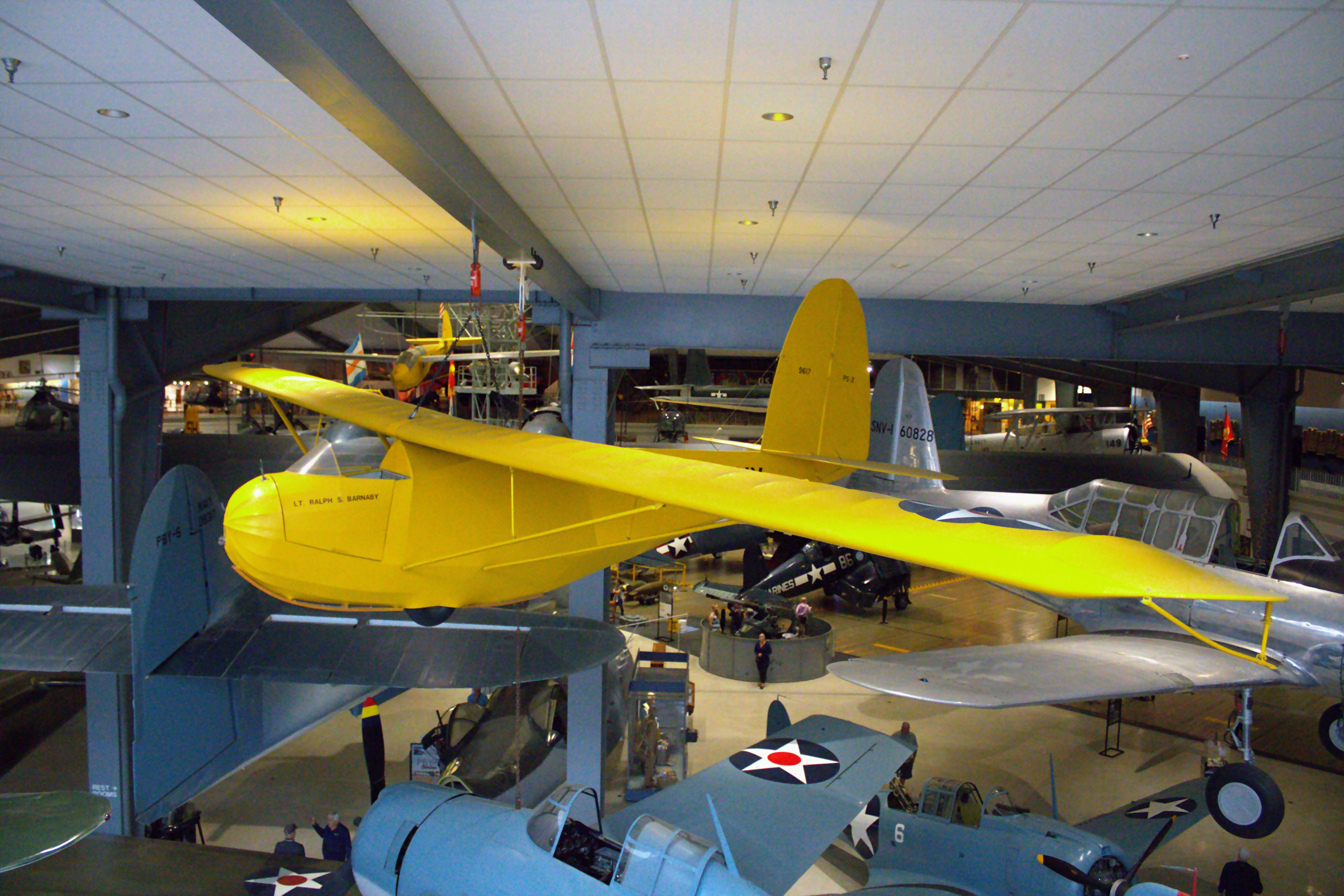
Franklin PS-2 on display at the National Naval Aviation Museum.

- National Air and Space Museum
- National Museum of Naval Aviation
- National Soaring Museum - four, plus one Franklin-Stevens PS-2
- US Southwest Soaring Museum
- Western Antique Aeroplane and Automobile Museum, Hood River, Oregon
- Michigan Flight Museum, Belleville, Michigan

== Specifications (PS-2) ==
Data from Sailplane Directory and Soaring

General characteristics

- Crew: one
- Wingspan: 36 ft 0 in (10.97 m)
- Wing area: 180 sq ft (17 m^{2})
- Aspect ratio: 7.2:1
- Empty weight: 220 lb (100 kg)
- Gross weight: 400 lb (181 kg)

Performance

- Maximum glide ratio: 15:1
- Rate of sink: 150 ft/min (0.76 m/s)
- Wing loading: 2.22 lb/sq ft (10.8 kg/m^{2})

== See also ==
- List of gliders
