= Fokker FG-2 =

German single-/two-seat glider, 1922

FG-2

General information
- Type: Glider
- National origin: Netherlands
- Manufacturer: N.V. Nederlandsche Vliegtuigenfabriek, Amsterdam
- Designer: Anthony Fokker
- Number built: 1

History
- First flight: 1922

The Fokker FG-2 was built by Anthony Fokker for the 1922 Rhön gliding competition, after visiting the Wasserkuppe during the 1921 competition.

== Design and development ==
After Fokker's visit to the Wasserkuppe during the 1921 contest, he set about designing and building a two-seat biplane glider to fly at the 1922 competition. A strut- and wire-braced biplane with tail surfaces supported on an open framework, Fokker's glider had a fabric-covered two-seat tandem cockpit nacelle sitting on the lower wing. The rear seat was close to the centre of gravity which ensured that the centre of gravity position was not affected whether the rear seat was occupied or not.

Fokker also built a similar single-seat biplane glider which was not flown regularly.

== Operational history ==
Fokker test flew the two-seater solo after it was assembled at the Wasserkuppe, revealing poor directional stability. Rudders with greater area were fitted to rectify this, which allowed competition flying and passenger flights to commence; Fokker soon soared the biplane two-seater for thirteen minutes with a passenger aboard. This was the world's first passenger flight using a glider aircraft.

After the Rhön competition Fokker moved on to Itford Hill, on the South Downs in Kent, for the Daily Mail gliding competition, held from 16 to 21 October 1922, where various prizes were offered. Fokker soared his biplane glider for 37 minutes to claim the prize for the longest duration over 30 minutes, achieving a flight of 37 minutes, which was soon eclipsed by Captain Olley flying the same aircraft for a duration of 49 minutes.

== Variants ==
Fokker FG-1 Single seat biplane glider – 1919
A single seat glider with open framework tailplane supports, open cockpit perched on the lower main-plane and two main skids either side of the pilot.
Fokker FG-2 Two-seat biplane glider – 1922
Designed and built specifically for the 1922 Rhön gliding competition, the two seater achieved several soaring flights and demonstrated passenger carrying. Fokker also flew this glider at the Daily Mail Itford Hill competition in England to claim a prize for the longest duration over 30 minutes.
Fokker FG-3 Single-seat biplane glider – 1922
A single seat biplane glider very similar in layout and construction to the FG-2, apparently flown little.
Fokker FG-4 Two-seat biplane glider – 1922
Further development of the FG-2 carried out by modifying the FG-2 during the Wasserkuppe and Itford Hill meetings.

== Specifications (Fokker FG-2) ==
Data from

General characteristics

- Crew: 1
- Capacity: 1
- Length: 5.6 m (18 ft 0 in)
- Wingspan: 12.0 m (39 ft 5 in)
- Wing area: 36 m^{2} (390 sq ft)
- Empty weight: 93 kg (210 lb)
- Gross weight: 163 kg (360 lb) one person; 233 kg (5l0 lb) two persons (estimated)

== Bibliography ==
- Simons, Martin (2006). Sailplanes 1920–1945 (2nd revised ed.). Königswinter: EQIP Werbung und Verlag. ISBN 3-9806773-4-6.
