= Gap–Tallard Airport =

Gap - Tallard Airport Aérodrome de Gap - Tallard
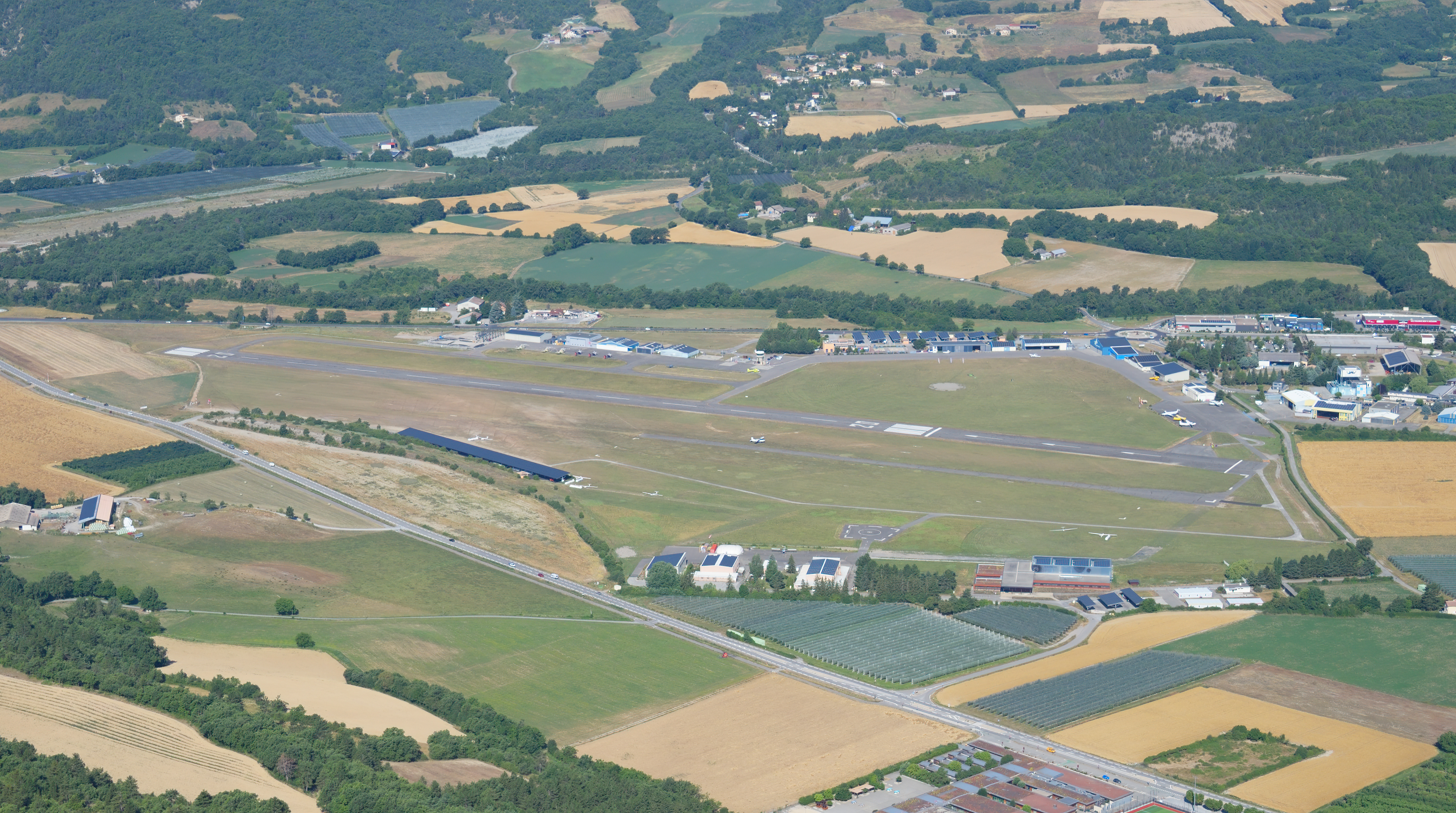
- IATA: GAT; ICAO: LFNA

Summary
- Airport type: Public
- Serves: Gap, Hautes-Alpes, France
- Location: Tallard
- Elevation AMSL: 1,966 ft (599 m)
- Coordinates: 44°27′14″N 006°02′12″E

Map
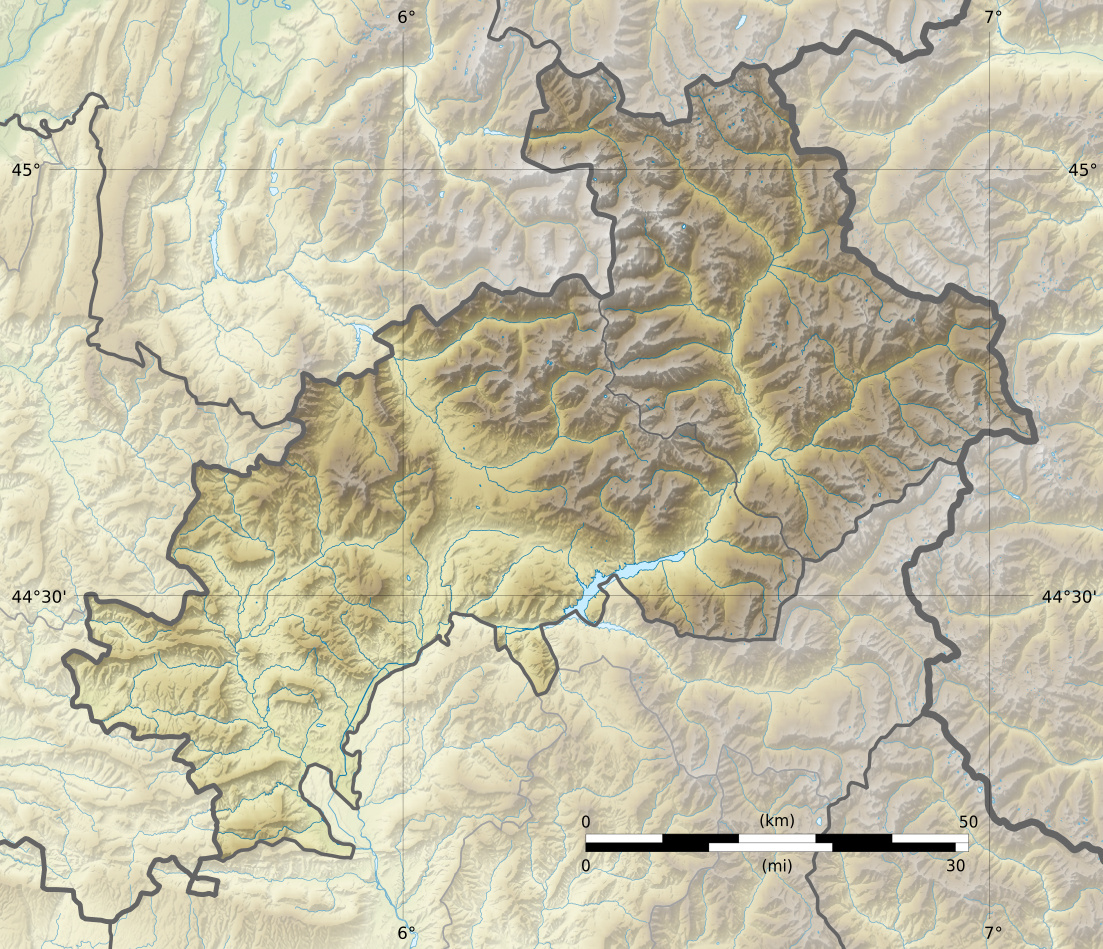
- Location in Hautes-Alpes department Location of department in France

Runways
Direction	Length		Surface
Direction	m	ft	Surface
03/21	965	3,166	Paved
03R/21L	700	2,297	Grass
03R/21L	443	1,453	Paved
- Source: French AIP

Gap – Tallard Airport (IATA: GAT, ICAO: LFNA) is an airport located in Tallard, 12 km (7 miles) south-southwest of Gap, both communes in the Hautes-Alpes department of the Provence-Alpes-Côte d'Azur region in southeastern France.

== Facilities ==
The airport is at an elevation of 1,966 feet (599 m) above mean sea level. The primary runway is designated 03/21 and has a paved surface which measures 965 by 30 metres (3,166 ft × 98 ft). There is also a parallel grass runway measuring 700 by 80 metres (2,300 ft × 260 ft) and paved strip measuring 443 by 10 metres (1,453 ft × 33 ft).
