= Fournier RF 4 =

German/French motor glider, 1966

RF 4
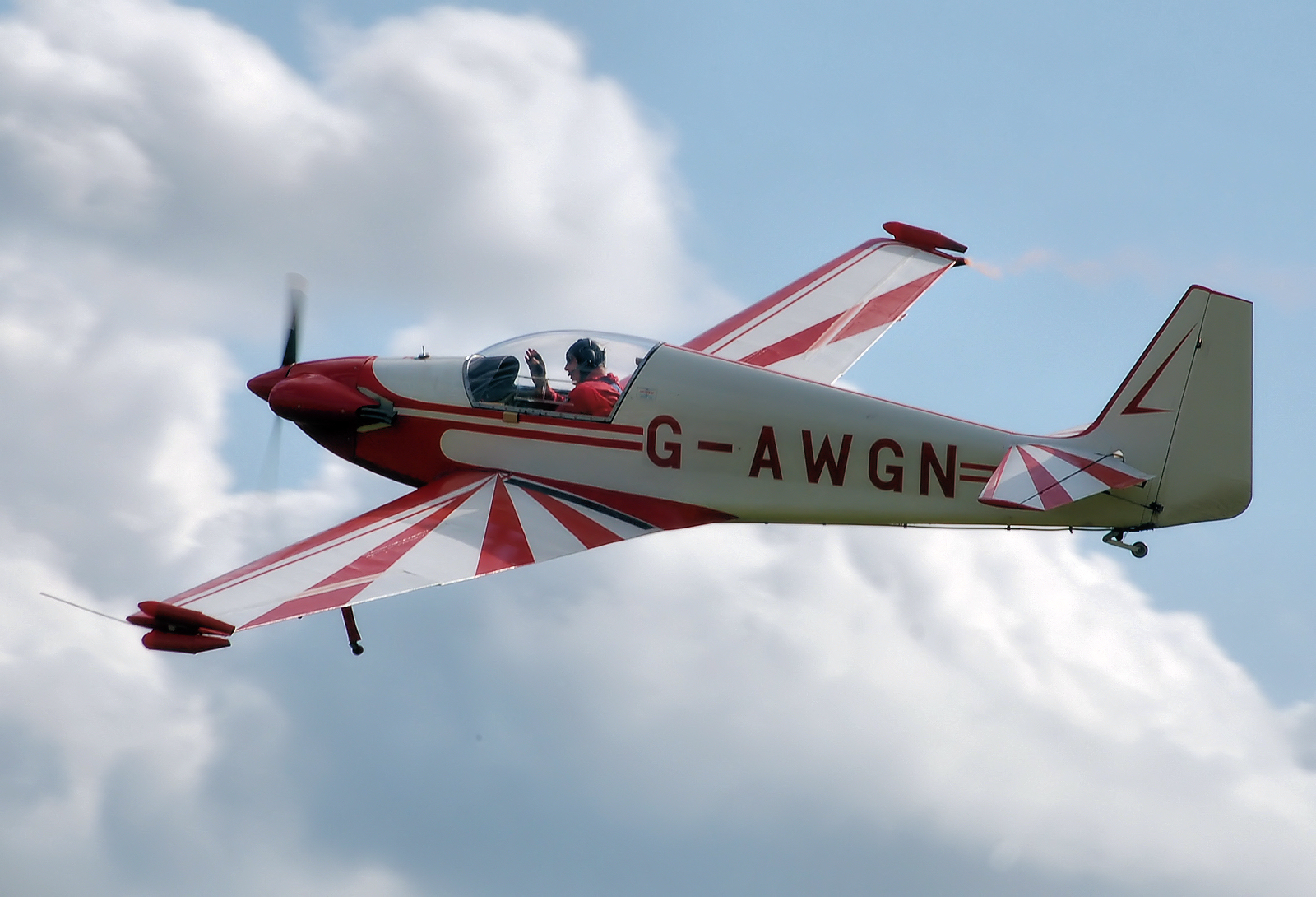
- RF 4D

General information
- Type: motor glider
- National origin: France
- Manufacturer: Alpavia / Sportavia-Pützer
- Designer: René Fournier
- Number built: 159

History
- Introduction date: 1966
- Developed from: Fournier RF 3

The Fournier RF 4 is a single-seater motor glider designed by René Fournier in 1966. It is an aerobatic version of the Fournier RF 3.

== Design and development ==
Conceived as a motor glider and sport touring aircraft, the RF 4 was introduced in 1966. It is of all-wood construction and is fully aerobatic. The landing gear consists of a monowheel gear which retracts forward into a fibreglass cowling. The main wheel has a brake which is manually operated. There is a small steerable tailwheel and wing-mounted outrigger wheels.

== Operational history ==
An RF 4D was flown by Mira Slovak across the Atlantic Ocean while participating in the May 1969 Daily Mail Trans-Atlantic Air Race. The flight won a £1,000 prize offered by the London Evening News for the best performance in the race by an aircraft under 5,000 lb (2,268 kg) gross take-off weight. The main landing gear fork is an ongoing maintenance issue, with regular replacements needed.

== Variants ==
RF 4
Prototype aerobatic variant of the RF 3, three-built by Alpavia
RF 4D
Production variant, 155 built in Germany by Sportavia-Putzer, D was for Deutschland. 16 shipped to America

== Specifications (RF 4D) ==
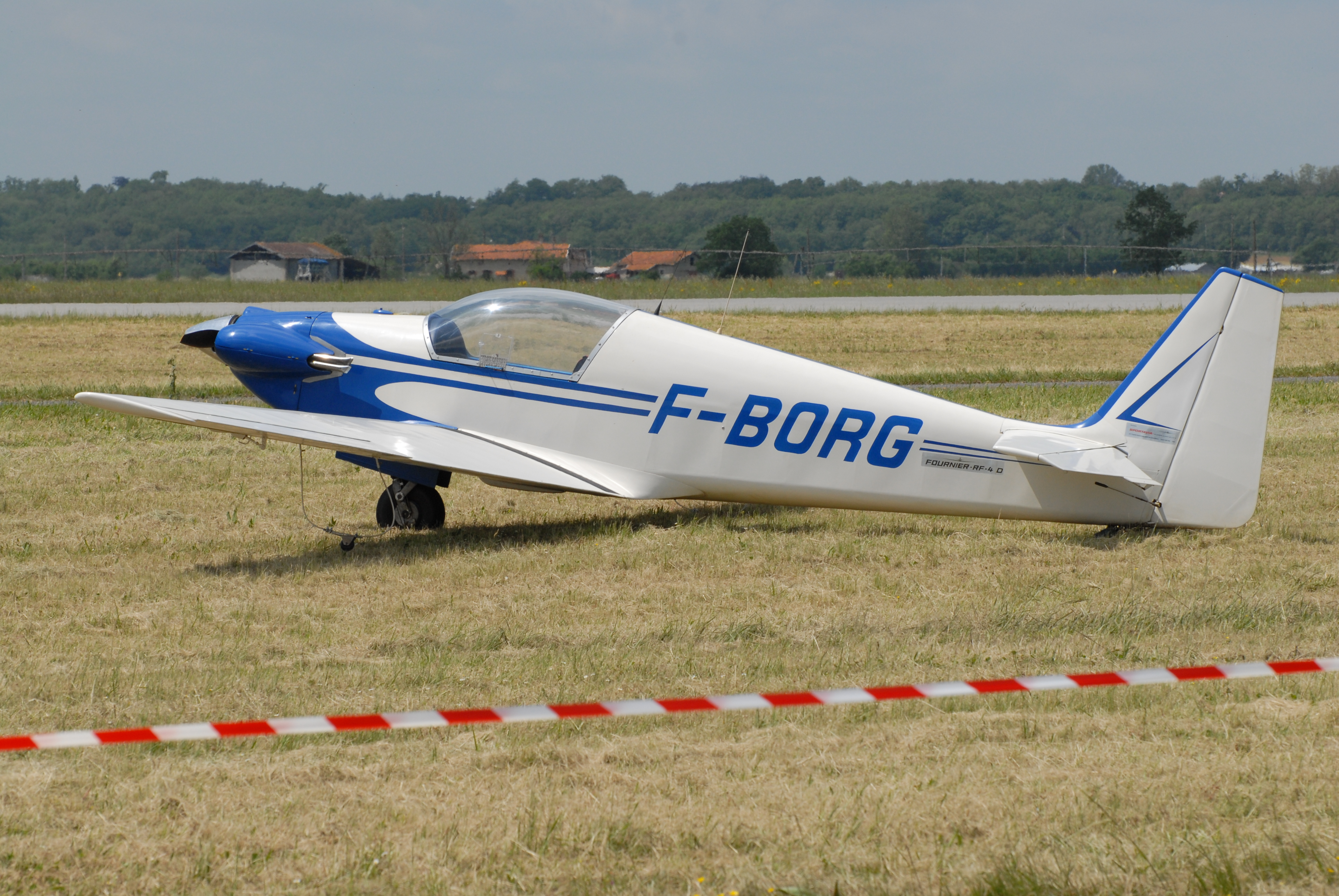
Sportavia Fournier RF 4D

Data from In the Air:Number 230:Fournier RF 4D and Plane and Pilot

General characteristics

- Crew: 1
- Length: 6.05 m (19 ft 10 in)
- Wingspan: 11.28 m (37 ft 0 in)
- Height: 1.57 m (5 ft 2 in)
- Wing area: 11.3 m^{2} (122 sq ft)
- Aspect ratio: 11.2
- Empty weight: 270 kg (595 lb)
- Gross weight: 390 kg (860 lb)
- Fuel capacity: 38 litres (8.4 imp gal; 10 US gal)
- Powerplant: 1 × Rectimo 4 AR 1200 (VW) air-cooled flat-four piston engine, 29 kW (39 hp)
- Propellers: 2-bladed Hoffmann, 1.50 m (4 ft 11 in) diameter

Performance

- Maximum speed: 196 km/h (122 mph, 106 kn)
- Cruise speed: 180 km/h (110 mph, 96 kn)
- Stall speed: 74 km/h (46 mph, 40 kn)
- Never exceed speed: 249 km/h (155 mph, 135 kn)
- Range: 640 km (400 mi, 350 nmi)
- Endurance: 4
- Service ceiling: 5,800 m (19,000 ft)
- g limits: 11
- Maximum glide ratio: 20:1
- Rate of climb: 3.5 m/s (690 ft/min)
- Wing loading: 34.5 kg/m^{2} (7.1 lb/sq ft)

== See also ==
- Fournier RF 5
