= Aviafiber =

Swiss sailplane manufacturer

Aviafiber was a Swiss sailplane manufacturer established in Wald in February 1977 by Ernst Ruppert, Hans Farner and Heinrich Bucher. Its most famous product was the Canard 2FL, a highly unorthodox design. A test pilot was killed in the crash of one of them, leading the company to withdraw them from the market. The company's name was changed to Canard Aviation as a result of legal action by the Avia petrol company and in 1982 was absorbed into Bucher Leichtbau.
