= Fauvel AV.50 =

French single seat sport aircraft

AV.50

General information
- Type: Sports plane
- Manufacturer: Homebuilt
- Designer: Charles Fauvel

The Fauvel AV.50 Lutin (English: Elf) (originally designated the AV.61) was a design for an unorthodox light aircraft produced in France in the 1970s. Like some other Charles Fauvel designs, it was a tailless aircraft with a reverse-delta wing. In this case, it was a single-seater intended to be powered by a converted Volkswagen engine. Only one example was known to have been under construction by 1977, in Australia.

Options for the builder included the use of a Rotax engine in place of the Volkswagen unit, and a choice of tandem, tailwheel, or tricycle undercarriage.

== Specifications (as designed) ==
General characteristics

- Crew: One pilot
- Length: 4.10 m (13 ft 6 in)
- Wingspan: 7.50 m (24 ft 8 in)
- Wing area: 10.8 m^{2} (116 sq ft)
- Aspect ratio: 5.2
- Empty weight: 190 kg (420 lb)
- Gross weight: 330 kg (725 lb)
- Powerplant: 1 × Volkswagen automotive engine , 50 kW (67 hp)

Performance

- Maximum speed: 190 km/h (118 mph, 103 kn)
- Endurance: 5 hours
- Rate of climb: 3.6 m/s (710 ft/min)

== See also ==
Related lists

- List of gliders
