= Fauvel AV.10 =

AV.10
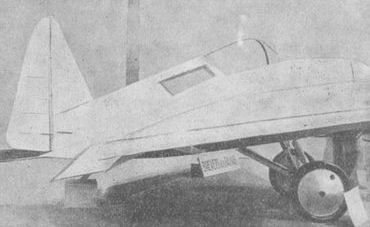

General information
- Type: Tailless light aircraft
- National origin: France
- Manufacturer: Fauvel
- Number built: 1

History
- First flight: 1935

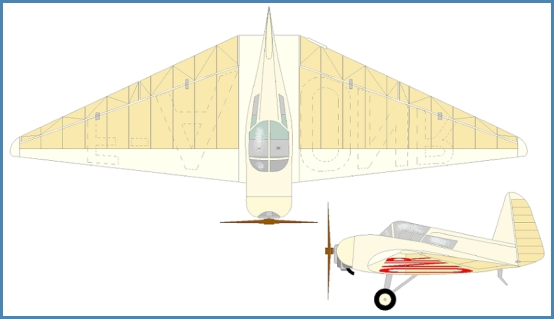
Colour profile drawing

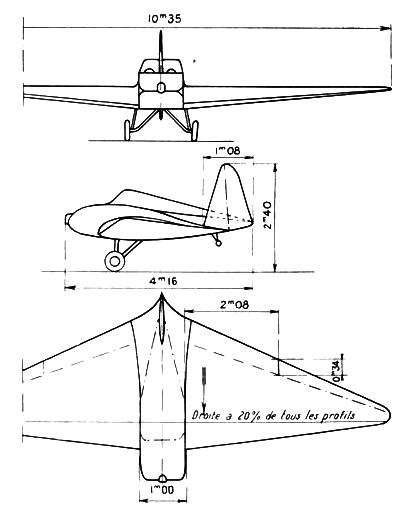
3-view

The Fauvel AV.10 was a tailless light aircraft built in France by Charles Fauvel. A two-seater side-by-side, equipped with a 75 hp engine, which first flew in 1935. Designed by Charles Fauvel, it was his first powered aircraft, designed from the outset as that, to have been realised. In 1936, it had been exhibited at the 25th Salon de L'Aéronautique at the Grand-Palais of Paris. The AV-10 was a one-off design and it disappeared in 1940. It is believed to have been taken away by German troops.

== Specifications ==
Data from

General characteristics

- Crew: Two
- Length: 4.35 m (14 ft 3 in)
- Wingspan: 10.00 m (32 ft 10 in)
- Wing area: 18.55 m^{2} (199.7 sq ft)
- Empty weight: 311 kg (686 lb)
- Gross weight: 548 kg (1,208 lb)
- Powerplant: 1 × Pobjoy R 7-cylinder air-cooled radial piston engine, 56 kW (75 hp)
- Propellers: 2-bladed

Performance

- Maximum speed: 185 km/h (115 mph, 100 kn)
- Cruise speed: 150 km/h (93 mph, 81 kn)
- Service ceiling: 5,600 m (18,400 ft)
