= F.V.D. Stehaufchen =

German single-seat glider, 19221

Stehaufchen
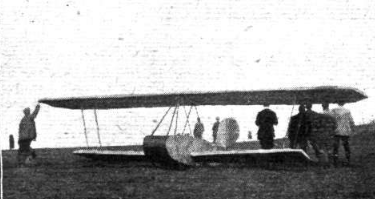
- At the 1922 Rhön contest

General information
- Type: Single seat biplane glider
- National origin: Germany
- Manufacturer: Flugtechnische Verein, Dresden (F.V.D.)
- Designer: Horst Muttray, Reinhold Seiferth, Rudolf Spies (T.H.Dresden)
- Number built: 1

History
- First flight: 23 August 1921

The F.V.D. Stehaufchen or Der Dresdener Stehaufchen, later relabelled the Akaflieg Dresden D-B1 Stehaufchen, was an unequal span biplane glider designed and built in Germany in 1921. It flew with some success at the second and third Rhön competitions on the Wasserkuppe and was also used to train pilots.

== Design and development ==
Before the formal formation of the Akaflieg Dresden in about 1924, there was collaboration between the Technical High School Dresden (TH Dresden) and the local flying club, the Flugtechnischer Verein Dresden (F.V.D.). The Stehaufchen was one result, named and designed by three TH Dresden students, Horst Muttray, Reinhold Seiferth, and Rudolf Spies. The biplane configuration was chosen to ensure strength against rough handling and its small size by the need to fit within the 4.20 m (165 in) limit set by rail transport. Construction began on 11 June 1921 and the first flight took place only about ten weeks later on 23 August on the Wasserkuppe.

During its career, the glider was known in England at least as the F.V.D. Stehaufchen after the club, or just as the F.V.D. glider to distinguish it from the F.V.D. monoplane or Doris of 1922. After the founding of the Akaflieg Dresden it was retrospectively renamed the D-B1 Stehaufchen, numbering it as the first of their ten designs.

The Stehaufchen was a single bay biplane with two spar wings of unequal span mounted without stagger but with an unusually large interplane gap of 1.50 m (59 in). The lower wing was mounted on the lower fuselage and the upper one held high above it by three pairs of inverted V-struts, one pair leaning backwards from the nose to the forward spar and the two other running vertically from the upper fuselage longerons to the two spars on the centre line. On each side a pair of parallel, slightly outward leaning interplane struts connected the forward and rear spars from the lower tips and the bays were cross braced with wires. Both wings were roughly rectangular in plan and slightly swept (1.2°); only the lower one carried dihedral (2°). The ratio of upper to lower wing areas was about 1.6:1. The wings, like the rest of the aircraft had a wooden structure: the spars were both wooden boxes and the leading edges were double ply skinned. Elsewhere the wings were fabric covered. Roll control was by wing warping on both planes.

The glider had a simple, wide, rectangular cross section fuselage with four cross braced longerons forming trusses. It was skinned with two-ply, with a final fabric covering. From the side the nose was smoothly rounded into a single curvature form with the open cockpit behind it, placing the pilot's seat close to quarter chord. Aft the depth decreased and the tailplane was attached to the top with the fuselage ending at the coincident elevator and rudder hinges. The horizontal tail surfaces were roughly rectangular and the elevator was a single piece structure. The fin was a quadrant and the rudder almost semicircular but cut away below for elevator movement. All the tail surfaces were wood framed and fabric covered. The Stehaufchen's undercarriage was a parallel pair of skids, intended to protect the low set lower wing on take-off and landings. The unusually broad fuselage enabled the skids to be separated by 700 mm (27.6 in). These were ash, laminated and of double curvature attached at three points, one below the pilot's feet and the others below each wing spar. The final section behind the rear mounting point curved down a little to protect the tail.

== Operational history ==
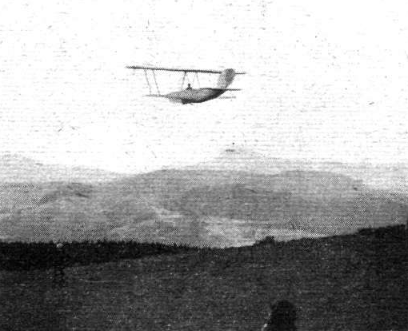
At the 1922 Rhön contest

The Stehaufchen first flew at the 1921 Rhön contest, the second of the series. Muttray began with a flight on 23 August which lasted just 38 seconds but five days later flew it for three minutes. More than one third of the competing aircraft were biplanes but of these the Stehaufchen was the most successful and its three designers received a 1,500 Mark prize. After the competition the Stehaufchen stayed on the Wasserkuppe until September, making flights of up to 4.5 minutes and enabling Seiferth and Spies to get their pilot's certificates.

The Stehaufchen was damaged on the rail journey home and during the rebuild the upper wing was increased in span from 8 m (26 ft 3 in) to 9 m (29 ft 6 in). It resumed test flying in the spring of 1922, launched by bungee cord. In this period several more pilots gained flight experience and their certificates. It then went to the third Rhön contest, where it gained first prize for total time in the air (1851 seconds) and second prize for distance covered in a single flight (2.7 km (1.7 mi)).

It went once more to the Wasserkuppe in 1923 but did not take part in the contest; during a practice flight, it crashed and was destroyed.

== Specifications ==
Data from Historische Deutsche Flugzeug bis 1945

General characteristics

- Crew: One
- Length: 4.80 m (15 ft 9 in)
- Upper wingspan: 8.00 m (26 ft 3 in)
- Lower wingspan: 6.00 m (19 ft 8 in)
- Height: 2.00 m (6 ft 7 in)
- Wing area: 18.7 m^{2} (201 sq ft)
- Empty weight: 70 kg (154 lb)
- Gross weight: 140 kg (309 lb)
- Wing loading: 7.50 kg/m^{2} (1.5 lb/sq ft)

Performance

- Maximum glide ratio: 1:8

== See also ==
Related lists

- List of gliders
