= Farner HF Colibri 1 SL =

HF Colibri 1 SL

General information
- Type: Single seat motor glider
- National origin: Switzerland
- Designer: Hans U. Farner
- Number built: 1

History
- First flight: c.1979

The Farner HF Colibri 1 SL was an unusual canard motor glider with a unique control system, designed and built in Switzerland in the late 1970s. Only one was constructed; much modified during the 1980s, it was still flying in 1990.

== Design and development ==
Hans U. Farner was an innovative Swiss aircraft designer whose footlaunched canard ultralight sailplane had briefly reached production in 1966. In November 1974 he filed a patent for a novel control system, particularly suitable for canards. This suggested mounting the canard on a slender tube which slid snugly within a second long forward tube that, together with a pod containing an engine, pilot and bearing mainplanes, formed the fuselage. Extension of the canard-carrying tube by means of fore and aft control column movement increased the canard's moment arm and increased pitch. The angle of attack of the canard was automatically altered as this happened. Rotating the tube about its long axis by rudder pedal movement turned the canard away from the horizontal and caused yaw, removing the need for a vertical rudder. Wing mounted ailerons controlled roll in the usual way.

The Farner HF Colibri 1 SL motor glider, designed, built and test flown by Hans Farner in the late 1970s embodied these ideas. It had a very high aspect ratio (31.7) wing with a constant chord centre section carrying dihedral. Outer panels, with anhedral, combined with the inner section to form a cantilever gull wing. These outer panels had straight taper on the leading edges only, and rotated as all-moving ailerons or "tiperons" for roll control.

The wing was mounted on top of a narrow fuselage pod, with the pilot under a rear hinged canopy well forward of its leading edge. The Colibri was a twin engined motor glider, with two single cylinder two stroke McCulloch MC-101A, each of 10.1 kW (13.6 hp) driving a two blade pusher configuration propeller via reduction gear and a high positioned shaft, just below and a little way behind the trailing edge. Under the drive shaft the fuselage remained deep but tapered rearwards into two door like aerofoils with straight, vertical trailing edges that could be opened symmetrically outwards as an airbrake. Positioned well behind the centre of gravity, they closed together as the only fin. Forward of the cockpit the fuselage curved gently upwards into a tubular, straight, tapering, rising boom. The parallel chord, unswept, high aspect ratio canard, carried on its constant diameter tube in the manner described in the patent, providing lift and both yaw and pitch control.

The first flight date is uncertain but the Colibri was complete by late 1979. The written record post-1980 is sparse but photographs show it was still flying in 1990, when it appeared at a display in Belgium. It had visited the UK in 1989, coming to the PFA meeting at Cranfield. During the 1980s it had undergone considerable modification to the novel control system, with high aspect ratio, swept fins on the wings first at the outer end of the centre section, just before the start of the rotating tiperons, and then at the wing tips. These images suggest that conventional flight control surfaces were added to both fore and aft wings as well as to the fins. The extensible fuselage also seems to have been abandoned by 1989.

== Specifications ==
Data from Gliders and Sailplanes of the World

General characteristics

- Crew: One
- Length: 7.201 m (23 ft 7.5 in)
- Wingspan: 17.50 m (57 ft 5 in)
- Height: 1.45 m (4 ft 9 in)
- Wing area: 9.65 m^{2} (103.9 sq ft)
- Aspect ratio: 31.7
- Airfoil: Wortmann FX-61-184 on centre section, FX-60-126/1 on outer panels
- Empty weight: 255 kg (562 lb)
- Max takeoff weight: 362 kg (798 lb)
- Fuel capacity: 21 L (4.6 Imp gal; 5.5 US gal)
- Powerplant: 2 × McCulloch MC-101A 123 cc, single cylinder two stroke, 10.1 kW (13.6 hp) each , coupled to drive a single, foldable propeller
- Propellers: 5-bladed pusher configuration

Performance

- Maximum glide ratio: 42±1:1 at 101 km/h (63 mph; 55 kn)
- Rate of sink: 0.55 m/s (108 ft/min) minimum, at 77 km/h (48 mph; 42 kn)
- Take-off run:120 m (394 ft)
