= Stevens SU-1 =

American glider

SU-1

General information
- Type: Glider
- National origin: United States
- Manufacturer: Stevens Institute of Technology
- Status: No longer in production
- Number built: about 4

History
- Introduction date: 1933
- First flight: 1933
- Developed from: Franklin PS-2

The Stevens SU-1 is an American single seat, high-wing, strut-braced, glider that was designed in 1933 by students at the Stevens Institute of Technology in Hoboken, New Jersey.

== Design and development ==
The SU-1 was developed as an attempt to improve the performance of the Franklin PS-2, by designing new wings for it as a student project. The PS-2's straight 36 ft (11.0 m) wings were replaced with 46 ft (14.0 m) gull-wings. Like the original wings, the new wings have two spars, but instead of parallel struts, the new wings use V-struts terminating at a single fuselage attachment point. Jury struts are also used. Like the original wings, the new wings are a wooden structure, covered in doped aircraft fabric covering. The SU-1 retains the PS-2's original steel tube fuselage. The landing gear is a fixed monowheel type.

Testing showed that the Stevens Institute students were successful and the SU-1 has a glide ratio of 17:1, two points better than the PS-2. It also has a slightly higher sink rate of 180 feet per minute versus the PS-2's 150. Gross weight was also increased from 400 lb (181 kg) to 550 lb (249 kg).

About four SU-1s were produced.

== Operational history ==
In 1983 Soaring magazine reported that two SU-1s were still in existence, one in serviceable condition and one in need of repair.

In April 2011 one remained on the Federal Aviation Administration register.

== Specifications (variant specified) ==
Data from Soaring

General characteristics

- Crew: one
- Wingspan: 46 ft 0 in (14.02 m)
- Wing area: 180 sq ft (17 m^{2})
- Aspect ratio: 11.5
- Empty weight: 325 lb (147 kg)
- Gross weight: 550 lb (249 kg)

Performance

- Maximum glide ratio: 17:1
- Rate of sink: 180 ft/min (0.91 m/s)
- Wing loading: 3.05 lb/sq ft (14.9 kg/m^{2})

== See also ==
- List of gliders
