= Fauvel AV.36 =

Single-seat French glider, 1951

AV.36
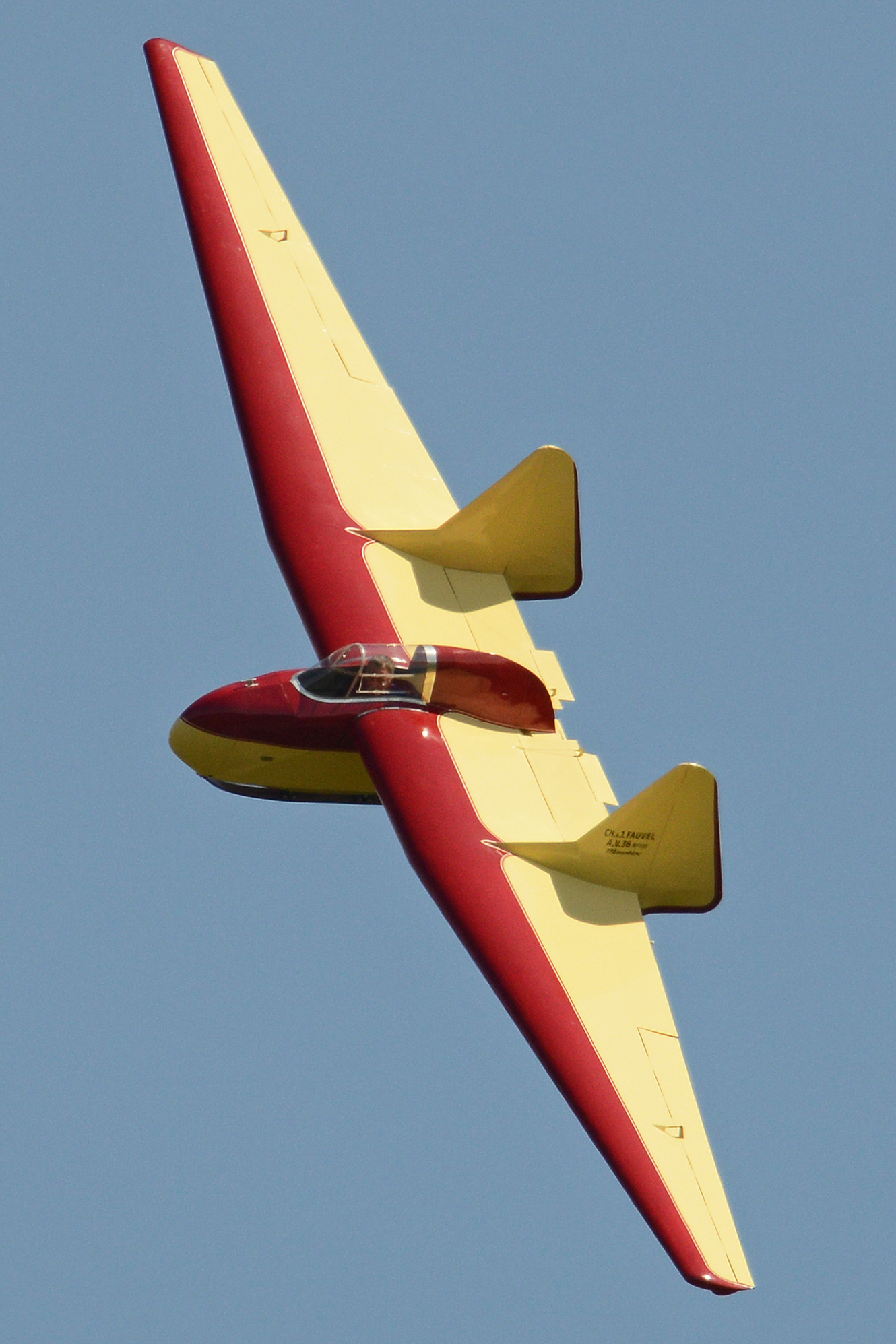
- An AV.36 in flight

General information
- Type: Flying wing glider
- Manufacturer: Homebuilt
- Designer: Charles Fauvel
- Number built: over 100

History
- First flight: December 31 1951

The Fauvel AV.36 was a single-seat tailless glider designed in France in the 1950s by Charles Fauvel. Although the "AV" in AV.36 stands for Aile Volante (Flying Wing), it was not a true flying wing: it featured two large fins mounted on stubby tailbooms extending back from the wing's trailing edge, and accommodated the pilot within a stubby fuselage. The aircraft was designed to be quickly disassembled for road transport, with the nose detaching, and the fins able to fold back against the trailing edge of the wing. A refined version with a slightly longer wingspan, the AV.361 was introduced in 1960.

The AV.36 lent itself to easy motorisation, with some builders installing an engine at the rear of the cockpit pod to drive a pusher propeller turning between the tail fins, and the Bölkow factory manufactured some aircraft in this configuration as the AV.36 C11.

Plans for the AV.36 have not been available in France since Fauvel's death in 1979, but as of 2012 they are still available from Canadian supplier Falconar Avia of Edmonton, Alberta.

== Variants ==
AV.36
AV.361
AV.36 C11

== Specifications (AV.36) ==
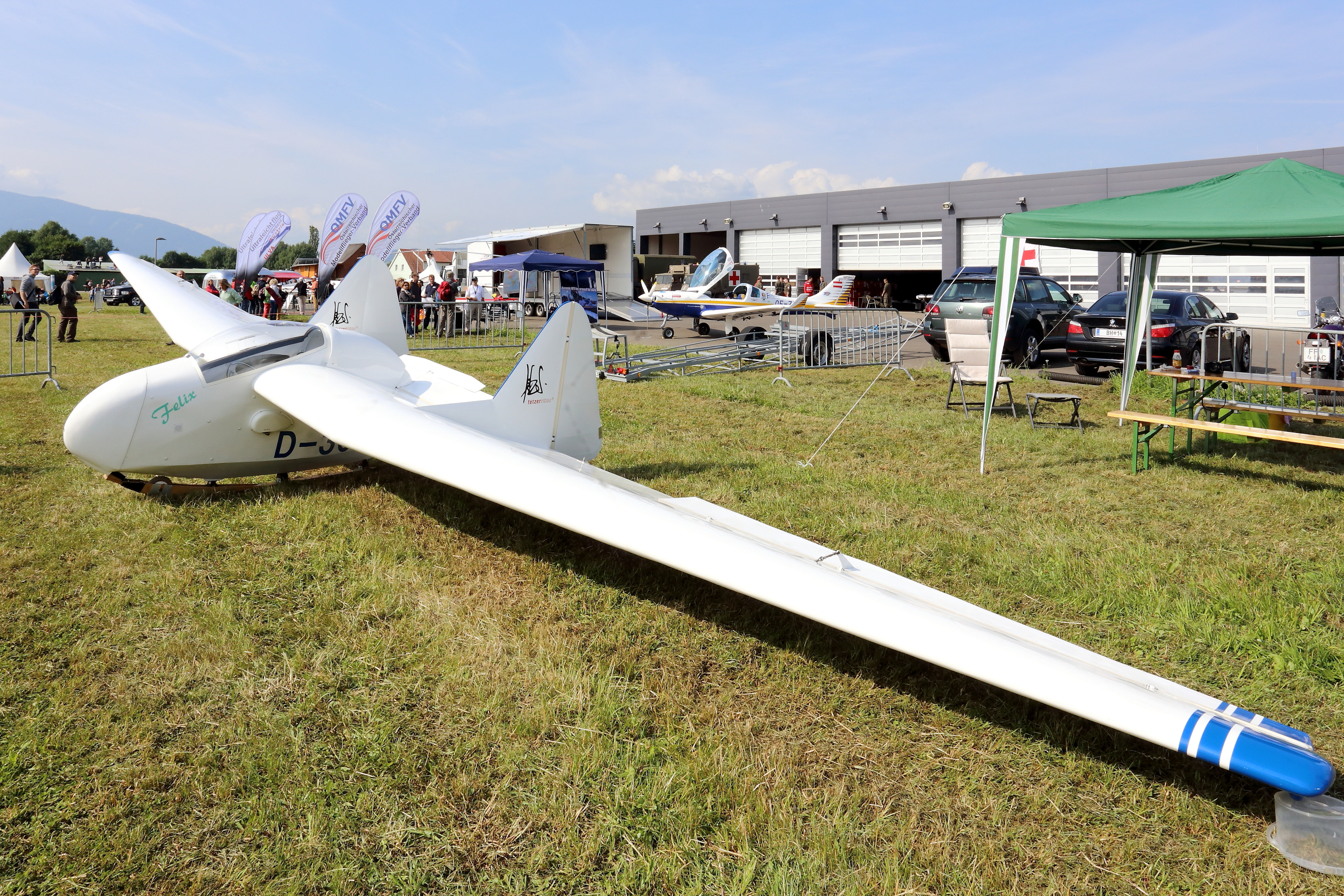
A restored Fauvel AV.36

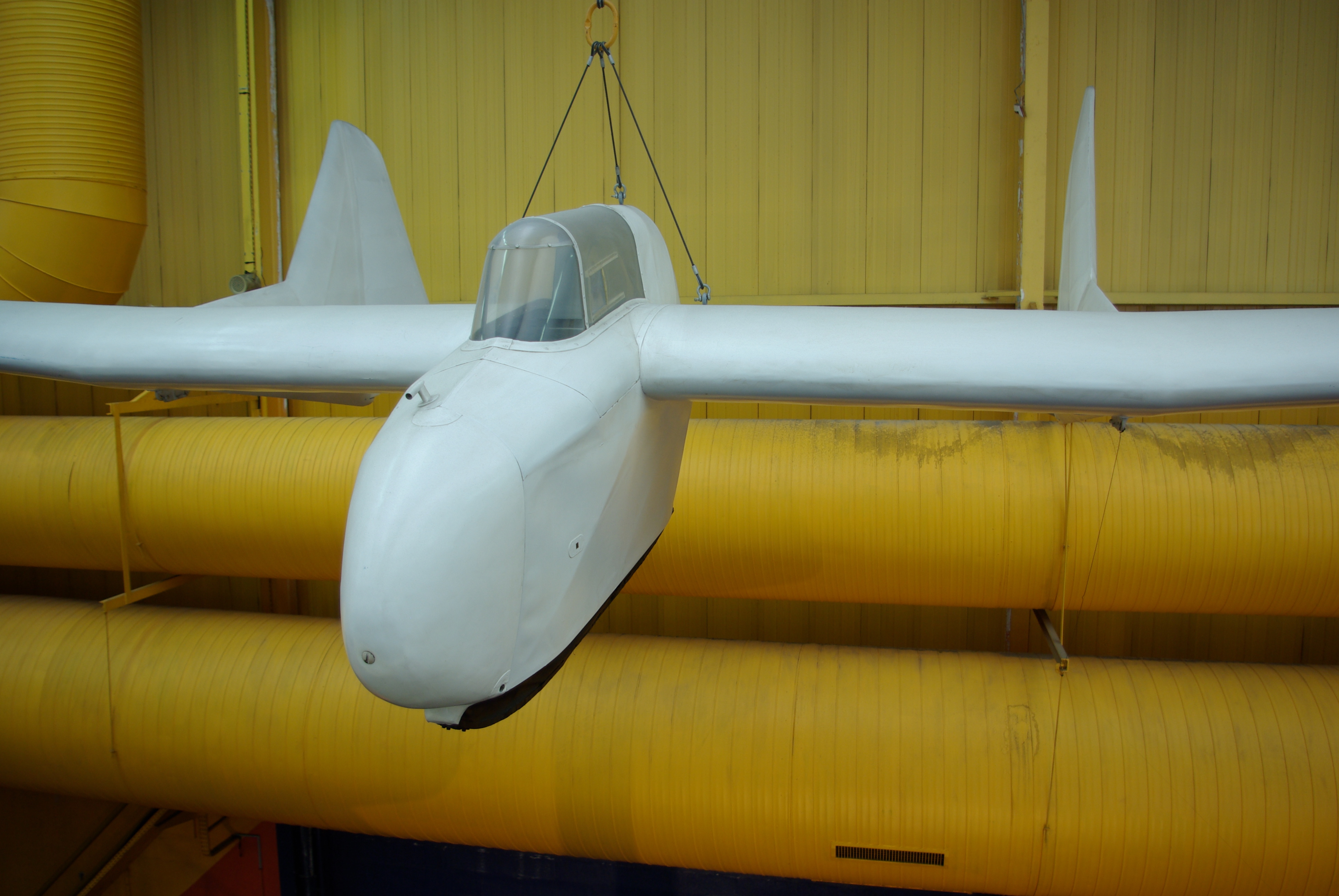
A Fauvel AV.36 at the French Air & Space Museum.

Data from The World's Sailplanes:Die Segelflugzeuge der Welt:Les Planeurs du Monde Volume II

General characteristics

- Crew: 1
- Length: 3.2 m (10 ft 6 in) nose to rudder tips
- Wingspan: 12.78 m (41 ft 11 in)
- Height: 1.2 m (3 ft 11 in) at cockpit
- Wing area: 14.6 m^{2} (157 sq ft)
- Aspect ratio: 11.4
- Airfoil: F_{2} 17%
- Empty weight: 125 kg (276 lb)
- Gross weight: 215 kg (474 lb)
- Max takeoff weight: 258 kg (569 lb)

Performance

- Stall speed: 58 km/h (36 mph, 31 kn)
- Never exceed speed: 220 km/h (140 mph, 120 kn)
- Rough air speed max: 158 km/h (98.2 mph; 85.3 kn)
- Aerotow speed: 128 km/h (79.5 mph; 69.1 kn)
- Winch launch speed: 119 km/h (73.9 mph; 64.3 kn)
- Terminal velocity: with full airbrakes 165 km/h (103 mph; 89 kn)
- g limits: +8 -4 at 254 km/h (157.8 mph; 137.1 kn)
- Maximum glide ratio: 26 at 84 km/h (52.2 mph; 45.4 kn)
- Rate of sink: 0.75 m/s (148 ft/min) at 65 km/h (40.4 mph; 35.1 kn)
- Wing loading: 14.7 kg/m^{2} (3.0 lb/sq ft) normal 17.7 kg/m^{2} (3.625 lb/sqft) maximum

== See also ==
Aircraft of comparable role, configuration, and era Fauvel AV.45 Related lists List of gliders
