= Fauvel AV.45 =

French motor glider, 1960

AV.45
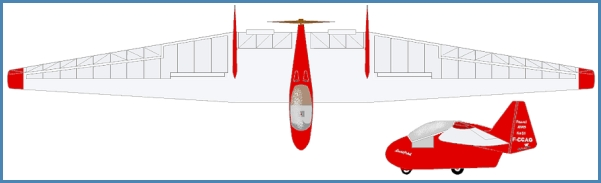

General information
- Type: Motorglider
- Manufacturer: Homebuilt
- Designer: Charles Fauvel

History
- First flight: 4 May 1960

The Fauvel AV.45 was an unorthodox motor glider produced in France in the 1960s and 1970s. Like other Charles Fauvel designs, it was a tailless aircraft, in this case inspired by the work that German firms had done on producing motorised versions of his AV.36 design. The prototype of the AV.45 was an extensively modified AV.36 powered by a Nelson H-59 two-stroke engine. AV.45s have been built with a number of other engines, however, including at least one aircraft powered by a small turbojet (a Microturbo Eclair). Falconar marketed the plans in the 1970s.

== Variants ==
- AV.45 - initial version
  - AV.451 - version with increased span and refined aerodynamics
- AV.48 - planned fibreglass version (not built)

== Specifications (AV 45) ==
Data from The World's Sailplanes:Die Segelflugzeuge der Welt:Les Planeurs du Monde Volume II

General characteristics

- Crew: 1
- Length: 3.7 m (12 ft 2 in) nose to rudder tips
- Wingspan: 13.68 m (44 ft 11 in)
- Height: 1.16 m (3 ft 10 in) at cockpit
- Wing area: 16.12 m^{2} (173.5 sq ft)
- Aspect ratio: 11.6
- Airfoil: F_{2} 17%
- Empty weight: 215 kg (474 lb)
- Gross weight: 302 kg (666 lb)
- Max takeoff weight: 350 kg (772 lb)
- Powerplant: 1 × Hirth O-280R horizontally opposed air-cooled piston engine, 41 kW (55 hp)

Performance

- Maximum speed: 142 km/h (88 mph, 77 kn)
- Never exceed speed: 220 km/h (140 mph, 120 kn)
- g limits: +6
- Maximum glide ratio: 26 with propeller feathered
- Rate of climb: 2.8 m/s (550 ft/min)
- Rate of sink: 0.85 m/s (167 ft/min) at 75 km/h (46.6 mph; 40.5 kn)
- Wing loading: 18.7 kg/m^{2} (3.8 lb/sq ft)
