= Charles Fauvel =

French aircraft designer

Charles Fauvel (31 December 1904 – 10 September 1979) was a French aircraft designer noted for his tailless and flying wing designs and, in particular, his sailplanes. Fauvel became interested in soaring after witnessing a competition at Vauville in 1925, and set out to design a competition glider with minimal drag, settling on the flying wing formula based on the work of Georges Abrial and René Arnoux. One of his designs, the AV.10 was the first tailless design to attain a French Certificate of Navigability. His greatest commercial success was the AV.36 sailplane, first flown in 1951.

Fauvel's other achievements included a number of aerial world records, including the world altitude and duration records for an aircraft under 400 kg, which he set in September 1929. In 1979, he was killed in the crash of a CAB Supercab that he was piloting.
