= Couzinet =

Couzinet may refer to:

== People ==
- Émile Couzinet (1896-1964), French film director
- René Couzinet (1904-1956), founder of French aerospace manufacturer
- Maurice Couzinet, actor
- David Couzinet, rugby union player

== Industry ==
- Société des Avions René Couzinet French aerospace manufacturer
- Couzinet 10 'Arc en Ciel'
- Couzinet 21
- Couzinet 22
- Couzinet 27 'Arc en Ciel'
- Couzinet 30
- Couzinet 33 'Biarritz'
- Couzinet 33 No.2
- Couzinet 40
- Couzinet 70 'Arc en Ciel III'. 1930s French three-engined commercial monoplane built by Société des Avions René Couzinet.
- Couzinet 80
- Couzinet 100
- Couzinet 101
- Couzinet 103
