= Arc-en-Ciel =

Arc-en-Ciel (French, 'rainbow') or L'Arc-en-Ciel may refer to:

- Arc-en-Ciel (newspaper), Burundi
- Arcenciel, a Lebanese NGO
- A supplement for the Swiss magazine TV8
- L'Arc-en-Ciel, a Japanese rock band
- L'arc-en-ciel (film), a 2009 short feature film
- Several aircraft designed by René Couzinet:
  - Couzinet 10 Arc-en-Ciel, a 1928 three-engined monoplane
  - Couzinet 11 Arc-en-Ciel II, a variant
  - Couzinet 70 Arc-en-Ciel III, a 1930s three-engined monoplane which crossed the Atlantic
- Arc-en-Ciel International School, in Lomé, Togo
- "Arc-en-Ciel", a 2019 song by Booba
- "Arc-en-Ciel", a 2024 Japanese musical by Takarazuka Revue

== See also ==
- Rainbow (disambiguation)
- Arconciel, a municipality in Switzerland
