= Farman three-engine flying-boat =

French maritime patrol flying boat of the early 1920s

"Three-engine flying-boat"/"High Seas Flying Boat"

General information
- Type: Patrol flying boat
- National origin: France
- Manufacturer: Farman
- Designer: Maurice Blanchard
- Primary user: Aéronavale
- Number built: 2

History
- First flight: 1921

The Farman "three-engine flying-boat" or Farman "High Seas Flying Boat" was an otherwise unnamed and un-designated flying boat built by Farman for the Aéronavale (French Navy aeronautical service). Two examples were operated for a short time.

== Design ==
The aircraft was of conventional flying-boat layout, influenced by designer Maurice Blanchard's time working for Georges Lévy and Farman's experience building Lévy aircraft under license. It was an unequal-span, unstaggered, two-bay biplane. Two pilots sat side-by-side in an open cockpit, with two gunners also in open cockpits, one at the bow, and the other amidships. The tail was of conventional design, with an elliptical fin reminiscent of Lévy flying boats. Power was provided by three piston engines mounted in the interplane gap. The centre engine, mounted above the hull, drove a pusher propeller, and the other engines, mounted slightly outboard of the hull on mountings above the lower wings, drove tractor propellers.

== Development ==
On 1 January 1918, the Service technique de l'aéronautique (the "Aeronautical technology service" of the French government) issued requirement for a long-range flying boat for maritime patrol in the same class ("HB.5") as the British Felixstowe aircraft. Farman responded with this design, and two examples were purchased. The aircraft first flew in 1921.

== Operational history ==
The Aéronavale assigned the two prototypes to its base at Saint-Raphaël for testing. They formed the basis of the short-lived escadrille H401 from 1922 to 1923. Due to the post-war economy, no further examples were ordered.

== Specifications ==
Data from Davilla & Soltan 1997, p.255

General characteristics

- Crew: 4, two pilots and two gunners
- Length: 18.00 m (59 ft 1 in)
- Wingspan: 33.00 m (108 ft 3 in)
- Wing area: 200 m^{2} (2,200 sq ft)
- Empty weight: 4,500 kg (9,921 lb)
- Gross weight: 7,000 kg (15,432 lb)
- Powerplant: 3 × Panhard-Levasseur piston engines , 250 kW (330 hp) each

Performance

- Endurance: 8 hours
- Time to altitude: 2,000 metres (6,600 ft) in 20 minutes

Armament

- Guns: 4× 7.7-millimetre (0.30 in) machine guns
- Bombs: 500 kilograms (1,100 lb)

== Notes ==
=== Bibliography ===
- Davilla, James J.; Soltan, Arthur M. (1997). French Aircraft of the First World War. Stratford, CT: Flying Machine Press.
- The Illustrated Encyclopedia of Aircraft. London: Aerospace Publishing.
- Liron, Jean (1984). Les Avions Farman [The Farman Aeroplanes] (in French). Paris: Éditions Larivière.
- Morareau, Lucien (2002). Les aeronefs de l'aviation maritime (1910-1942) [Maritime aviation aircraft (1910-1942)] (in French). Paris: ARDHAN. cited on "Farman Blanchard trimoteur (HB.5)".
