= Jeanjos Parfait =

Burundian musician

- Birth name: Jean Joseph Parfait Niyonkuru
- Also known as: Bebeto
- Born: October 2, 1991 (age 33); Gitega, Burundi
- Genres: Gospel; R&B; jazz; soul; r&b; dance-pop; Kirundi
- Occupations: Singer; songwriter; pianist; artist; composer
- Instrument(s): Vocals, bass guitar
- Years active: 2016–present
- Labels: Grands Pictures Production, Fight for your Dreams
- Members: CLM Worship & Creative Arts Team
- Website: http://www.jeanjosparfait.com

Jean Joseph Parfait Niyonkuru, better known as Jeanjos Parfait, is a Burundian gospel artist, singer, songwriter and arranger. In 2019, he was named as the most creative and dynamic artist in Burundi in the Top10 of BeTV.

== Childhood and education ==
Jean Joseph Parfait Niyonkuru, born October 2, 1991, in Gitega, is the ninth child of Niyonkuru Egide (agronomist of the Institute of Agronomic Science of Burundi) and teacher Nayuguhora Dorothée. He did his secondary studies at the International School of Gitega and followed a double course, civil engineering and ophthalmology, at the university.

== Career ==
=== Football career ===
Parfait is a former Burundian professional football player. With his two older brothers, he played in the team called Maika and was nicknamed "Bebeto" because of the Brazilian football star Bebeto, forming in the 1990s the offensive duo of Brezil with Romário. In 2005, he signed a contract in the first division of the F.C. Fuso in Gitega, currently the political capital of Burundi.

=== Musical career ===
Under the influence of his older brother, Parfait gave up the champinnat, after playing only three games, to become a chorist in the Living Church of Gitega. He was baptized that same year. He learned to play the basic guitar and work as a sound engineer for the choir in which he sang.

In 2013, he became a member of the CLM Worship & Creative Arts Team of the English church Christian Life Ministries. One year rather, he created a band of bass players with Adjanga Dieu Grâce and François Niyonkuru, which did not work as planned. He retired and began to write his own songs.

In 2016, under the name Jeanjos Parfait, he released his first song, "Urakoze Mana", which speaks of marriage as a gift from God. His second song, "Uwera" (from the Kirundi for "Saint"), was released in 2017.

After the launch of the official video for "Urakoze Mana" on January 23, 2019, the song won the grand finale of the Top10 of the channel Best Entraitement Television in Burundi – BeTV.

He was spotted by the Burundian record company Grand Pictures Production, which announced that it had signed him for a six-month contract. The announcement was made during a press conference broadcast on several local television stations including BETV Burundi, Indundi TV, NICKO TV and Bujahit TV. The choice to sign Parfait, explained the head of the label and director Landry SB, was a reward to the artist for his work in the Burundian music industry.

Parfait created his own label, Fight for your Dreams, in August 2019. Under this new label, he released his first song, "Nd'Uwunesha" ("I am victorious").

== Discography ==
=== Singles ===
- 2017: "Urakoze Mana"
- 2017: "Uwera"
- 2019: "Nd'Uwunesha"
- 2020: "Birthday"
- 2020: "The Song of Victory"
- 2021: "Imagine"

== Awards ==
- 2019: Winner of Burundian Top10
