= Couzinet 100 =

Three-engined, three-seat touring aircraft

General information
- Type: Large touring aircraft
- National origin: France
- Manufacturer: Société Avions René Couzinet
- Designer: René Couzinet

History
- First flight: 23 June 1933

The Couzinet 100 was a three-engined, three-seat touring aircraft designed and built in France in 1930. It served as the basis for two closely related variants, the Couzinet 101 and Couzinet 103, which differed primarily in their engine installations. None of the versions entered series production.

== Design ==
The Couzinet 100 series of touring aircraft was broadly similar to its contemporary the Couzinet 20 but was smaller, with a span reduced to 84%, carried three rather than five and had a fixed undercarriage. It used similarly low-powered engines and had Couzinet's characteristic fin, formed from the fuselage.

The Couzinet 101 had a one piece, low, cantilever wing, constructed entirely from wood, with a single spar which ran from tip to tip and a rear false spar interrupted by the cabin. It was plywood-skinned and thick at the root but thinned progressively outboard from below, providing a little dihedral. Chord was also large at the root, where the wing was generously faired into the fuselage. The plan became trapezoidal outboard with long, approximately elliptical tips. The straight part of the trailing edges were filled with long, narrow-chord ailerons carrying ground-adjustable trim tabs.

Two of the 101's three 63 kW (85 hp), seven-cylinder Pobjoy R radial engines, enclosed in NACA cowlings, were mounted ahead of the leading edges on steel frames isolated on rubber blocks and toed outwards. The third was in the fuselage nose. All had their own oil tanks and fire extinguishers; fuel was stored in the wings. The fuselage was a wooden semi-monocoque formed with frames and stringers. The enclosed cabin seated three in tandem, with the pilot at the leading edge between the engines and the two passengers behind. Each occupant had both roof and side windows. Behind the cabin the fuselage curved upwards in Couzinet's distinctive way, the upper side narrowing to form a very broad-chord fin; its one-piece, almost triangular tailplane was built into the fuselage, carrying very narrow elevators. Like the ailerons, these had ground adjustable tabs. The rudder had a rather pointed tip but was curved and full; extending down to the keel, it operated in a slight elevator cut-out.

All versions of the Couzinet 100 had fixed, tailwheel landing gear. When the Couzinet 100, powered by 34 kW (45 hp) Salmson 9 ADb radials made its first flight it had mainwheels in trouser fairings and relied on low pressure tyres to absorb landing shocks. One flight was enough to see its return to the factory, where a more conventional three strut arrangement was installed. The Couzinet 101 had similar gear, each wheel with a near-vertical oleo strut to the forward spar in the inner wing and a cranked axle and drag strut from the lower fuselage. The wheels, in spats, were below the outer engines with a track of 2.83 m (9 ft 3 in). The mainwheels had independent brakes and the tailwheel castored on its oleo strut.

== Development ==
The forward fuselage of the Couzinet 100 was on display at the 13th Paris Salon in November 1932. It first flew at Villacoublay on 23 June 1933. The Pobjoy-engined 101 was there early in November, being prepared for flight and still referred to as the Couzinet 100. It first flew between 11 and 18 November. At the end of February 1934 it returned from tests with C.E.M.A. for modifications to the fuel system.

The Couzinet 101 failed to attract buyers and the sole example, F-AMTJ, was the only Couzinet 100 series aircraft to be registered. It became one of the many unusual aircraft to be bought by the Spanish (Republican) government when the Spanish Civil War began in 1936. Its subsequent history is unknown.

Little is recorded about the Couzinet 103, which was powered by three 60 kW (80 hp) Salmson 9 ADr radials.

== Variants ==
Couzinet 100
3 × 34 kW (45 hp) Salmson 9 ADb. Flew 23 June 1930. Trousered undercarriage initially.
Couzinet 101
3 × 56 kW (75 hp) Pobjoy R. Flew November 1933.
Couzinet 103
3 × 60 kW (80 hp) Salmson 9 ADr.

== Specifications (Couzinet 101) ==
Data from Les Ailes January 1934

General characteristics

- Crew: One
- Capacity: Two passengers
- Length: 10.05 m (33 ft 0 in)
- Wingspan: 13.50 m (44 ft 3 in)
- Height: 3 m (9 ft 10 in)
- Wing area: 20 m^{2} (220 sq ft)
- Empty weight: 900 kg (1,984 lb) equipped
- Gross weight: 1,420 kg (3,131 lb)
- Fuel capacity: 300 L (66 imp gal; 79 US gal)
- Powerplant: 3 × Pobjoy R 7-cylinder radial, 63 kW (85 hp) each at 3,300 rpm; geared down 0.47:1
- Propellers: 4, wooden-bladed, 1.76 m (5 ft 9 in) diameter

Performance

- Maximum speed: 250 km/h (160 mph, 130 kn)
- Cruise speed: 220 km/h (140 mph, 120 kn)
- Range: 885 km (550 mi, 478 nmi)
- Service ceiling: 5,800 m (19,000 ft)
- Time to altitude: 11 min 31 sec to 3,000 m (9,800 ft)
- Ceiling with one outer engine stopped: 3,600 m (11,800 ft)
