= Émile-Louis Letord =

- Born: 10 march 1880; Meudon, France
- Died: 28 March 1971 (aged 91); Meudon
- Occupations: Engineer; Company founder
- Known for: industrialist and pioneer Aeroplane manufacturer

Émile Louis Letord, sometimes spelled Letort, (1880–1971) was a French industrialist and pioneer aeroplane manufacturer who founded the Société d'Aviation Letord from the Letord and Niepce workshops at Meudon, near Paris.

In 1909 Letord and Niepce built their first aircraft, a monoplane, at their workshops on rue de Paira at Meudon. In 1910 they were commissioned to build a Farman type biplane by Colonel Dorand, director of the Service technique de l'aéronautique (STAé) at Chalais-Meudon. Letord went on to build the Dorand AR.1 and 2 and the three-seater armed reconnaissance Letord 1. Letord also undertook sub-contract work for major aircraft manufacturers such as Nieuport. Some 1,500 aircraft were ordered by the Aéronautique Militaire between all the variants, with something like 300 actually produced before the end of the war.

On 17 February 1930 a fire destroyed the workshops and aircraft at Meudon, these included a twin tri-motor engined Couzinet 20 and a Couzinet 27 Arc-en-ciel II.

Letord is associated with around 40 patent applications for improvements to aircraft design between 1919 and 1953, and some patents on other topics. Some of the applications are shared with Marcel Letort, Camille Letort and Louis Béchereau.
