= Mass media in Burundi =

Mass media in Burundi mainly consists of radio, television, and printed resources, with a project underway to improve internet access to the country. Most mass media in Burundi is controlled by the government, and access to international mass media is limited.

== Radio ==
As of 30 June 2021, Burundi registers the following radio stations (Telecommunications Authority, 2021):

=== Nationally owned radio stations ===
- RADIO BUNTU IJWI RY’IMPFUVYI N’ABAPFAKAZI
- RADIO » IJWI RY’ IMBABAZI
- RADIO BENAA FM
- RADIO CCIB FM+
- RADIO AGAKIZA
- RADIO COLOMBE FM
- RADIO CULTURE
- RADIO DESTINY FM
- RADIO EAGLE SPORT FM
- RADIO FREQUENCE MENYA
- RADIO IJWI RY’ UMUKENYEZI
- RADIO ISANGANIRO
- RADIO IZERE FM
- RADIO MARIA BDI
- RADIO REMA FM
- RADIO SCOLAIRE NDERAGAKURA FM
- RADIO SPECIALE HUMURIZA FM
- RADIO STAR FM
- Chameleone FM

=== Internationally owned radio stations ===
- RFI
- RADIO HIT AFRIQUE
- RADIO ROYAL MEDIA.

The addresses and frequency assigned to those stations are summarized in the table below (Communications Commission, 2021):

N	Name	Frequency	Station	Since	Key Contact	Address
1	RTNB	92.9 MHz	Bujumbura	1959	Jonas Ndikumurimyi	
2	CCIB FM+	99.4 MHz	Bujumbura	1993	J. Jacques Ntamagara	
3	CULTURE	88.2 MHz	Bujumbura	1999	Salomee Ndayishimiye	www.radioculture.org
4	NDERAGAKURA	87.9 MHz	Bujumbura	2000	Stany Nahayo	www.radionderagakura.org
5	IVYIZIGIRO	90.9 MHz	Bujumbura	2000	Onesime Habarugira	
6	ISANGANIRO	89.7 MHz	Bujumbura	2002	Sylvere Ntakarutimana	www.isanganiro.org
7	MARIA	98.4 MHz	Bujumbura	2003	Abbe Desire Bireha	

== Television ==
Television in Burundi was introduced in 1984, with coverage having national reach in 1992. As of 2004, there was still only one television service, the government-owned Télévision Nationale du Burundi.

The television stations registered in 2021 are the following (Telecommunications Authority):

- TELEVISION NATIONALE DU BURUNDI
- HERITAGE TV
- REMA TV
- TELEVISION ARGOS
- TELEVISION SALAMA
- CITIZEN TV (satellite)
- TELEVISION NUMERIQUE DENOMMEE « BEST ENTERTAINMENT TELEVISION (BE TV) »
- TELEVISION « MASHARIKI TV »
- TELEVISION BURUNDI BWIZA

=== Main channels ===
Name	Owner	Type	Launched
RTNB	Government of Burundi	State-owned	1975
Télé Renaissance	Bernard Henri Levy	Private-owned	2008
Héritage TV	?	Private-owned	2008
TV Salama	?	Private-owned	2008
BeTV	?	Private	2017
MASHARIKI TV

There are also three main tele distributors:

- TELE -10
- STARTIMES
- AZAM MÉDIA.

Tele 10 started operations in 1997. By the mid-2000s it offered a limited package of French channels (Canal+ Horizons, TF6, LCI, TV5, France 2, etc.) as well as English-language channels from the DStv service.

Best Entertainment Television (BETV, BE TV or BeTV) is a local private television that was launched on 25 October 2017 in Bujumbura, Burundi.

BETV Burundi currently broadcasts several programmes like Amakuru, Journal, and Believe SHOW.

== Internet ==
Burundi has launched a $25 million investment project in a fibre-optic cable network to widen access to broadband Internet and cut costs.

News Website In Kurindi; https://ubwengebwikirundi.freeforums.net/board/3/ubwengebwikirundi

== Print ==
Newspapers include:

- Arc-en-Ciel
- Burundi Chrétien
- Burundi Tribune
- Le Renouveau du Burundi

Iwacu, founded abroad in 1993, began publishing in Burundi as a weekly in 2008. It quickly became the most-circulated newspaper in Burundi and as of 2016 is the only privately owned one.

== See also ==
- Burundian literature
- arte
- Internet censorship and surveillance in Burundi
- BeTV (Burundi)

== Bibliography ==
- "Burundi: Directory: Broadcasting and Communications". Africa South of the Sahara 2004. Regional Surveys of the World. Europa Publications. 2004. p. 158. ISBN 1857431839.
- "Burundi", Freedom of the Press, USA: Freedom House, 2016, OCLC 57509361
- "Radio silence: Burundi's media targeted in ongoing political crisis", Global Voices, 17 February 2016 – via The Guardian
