= Société d'Aviation Letord =

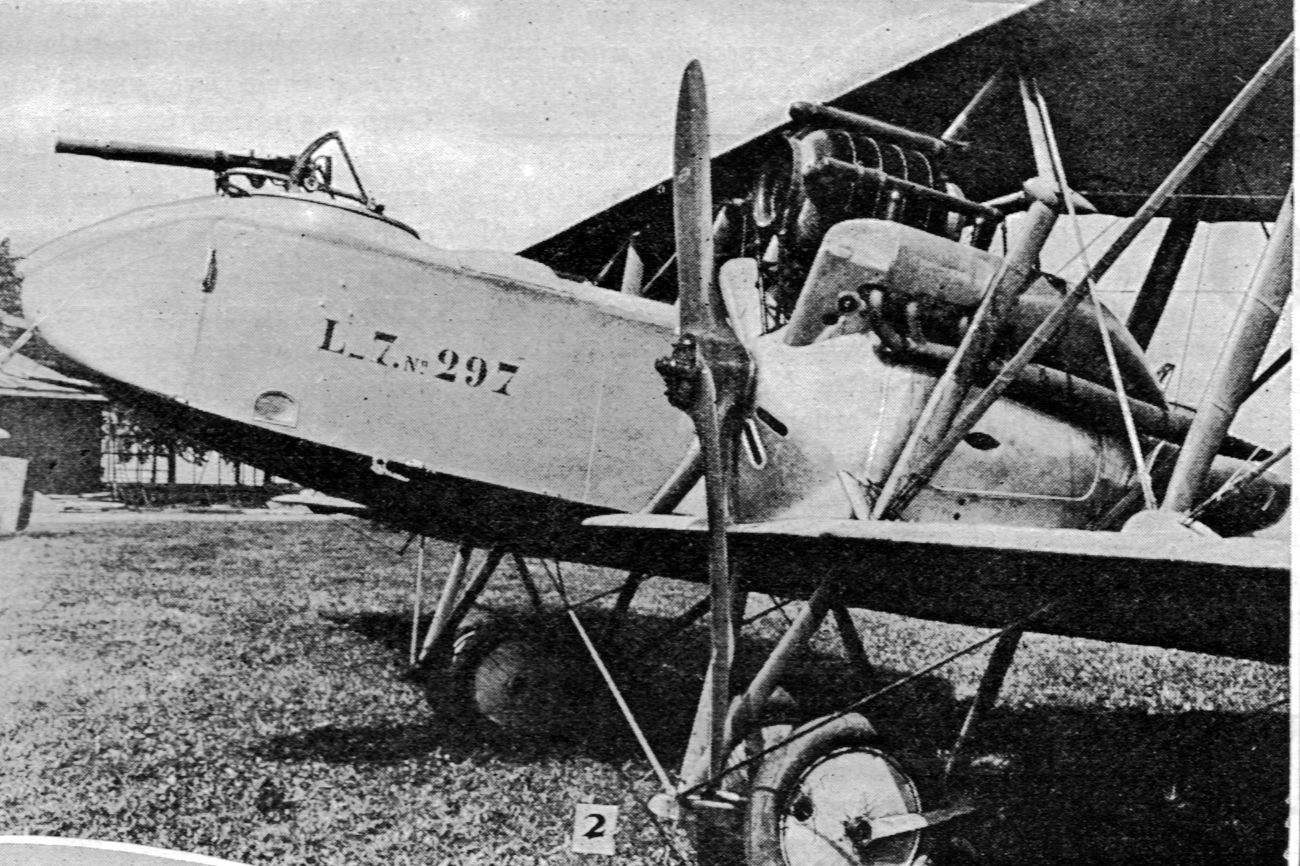
Type 7

Société d'Aviation Letord was a French aircraft manufacturing company that was formed in the early 1910s by the French aviation industrialist Émile-Louis Letord. It manufactured a number of military aircraft during the First World War.

== History ==
The company was formed in the early 1910s by the French aviation industrialist Émile-Louis Letord, (1883-1971). It produced a number of twin-engined biplanes for the French military during World War I.

== Aircraft designs ==
- Let.1 - reconnaissance biplane
- Let.2 - reconnaissance biplane
- Let.3 - twin-engined bomber biplane
- Let.4 - twin-engined reconnaissance biplane
- Let.5 - twin-engined bomber biplane
- Let.6 - escort fighter
- Let.7 - twin-engined bomber biplane
- Let.9 - twin-engined night bomber biplane

== See also ==
- Émile-Louis Letord
