= Couzinet 80 =

80

General information
- Type: Trainer
- Manufacturer: Société des Avions René Couzinet

History
- Manufactured: 1
- First flight: 3 October 1933
- Developed from: Couzinet 30

The Couzinet 80 was a training aircraft built in France in the early 1930s.

== Design ==
The Couzinet 80 was a four-seat low-wing monoplane of all-wood construction, based on the Couzinet 30.

== Specifications (variant specified) ==
Data from

General characteristics

- Crew: 4
- Length: 11.25 m (36 ft 11 in)
- Wingspan: 16.16 m (53 ft 0 in)
- Height: 3.52 m (11 ft 7 in)
- Wing area: 34.4 m^{2} (370 sq ft)
- Empty weight: 1,623 kg (3,578 lb)
- Gross weight: 2,280 kg (5,027 lb)
- Powerplant: 2 × Salmson 9Nc 9-cylinder air-cooled radial piston engines, 101 kW (135 hp) each

Performance

- Maximum speed: 210 km/h (130 mph, 110 kn)
