= Letord Let.9 =

French WW1 bomber aircraft

Let.9

General information
- Type: Night bomber
- National origin: France
- Manufacturer: Letord

History
- First flight: 1918

The Letord Let.9 was a night bomber built in France late in the World War I. It was a large biplane of largely conventional design, with unstaggered wings of equal span. The empennage consisted of a single, large, triangular fin and biplane horizontal stabilisers. Twin engines were mounted in the interplane gaps and the main undercarriage units were fitted with dual wheels. The Aéronautique Militaire gave it the designation BN.2 (Bombardement de Nuit - "Night Bomber", 2 seats).

The Let.9 was never produced in series; plans to do so were cancelled with the end of the war.

== Specifications ==
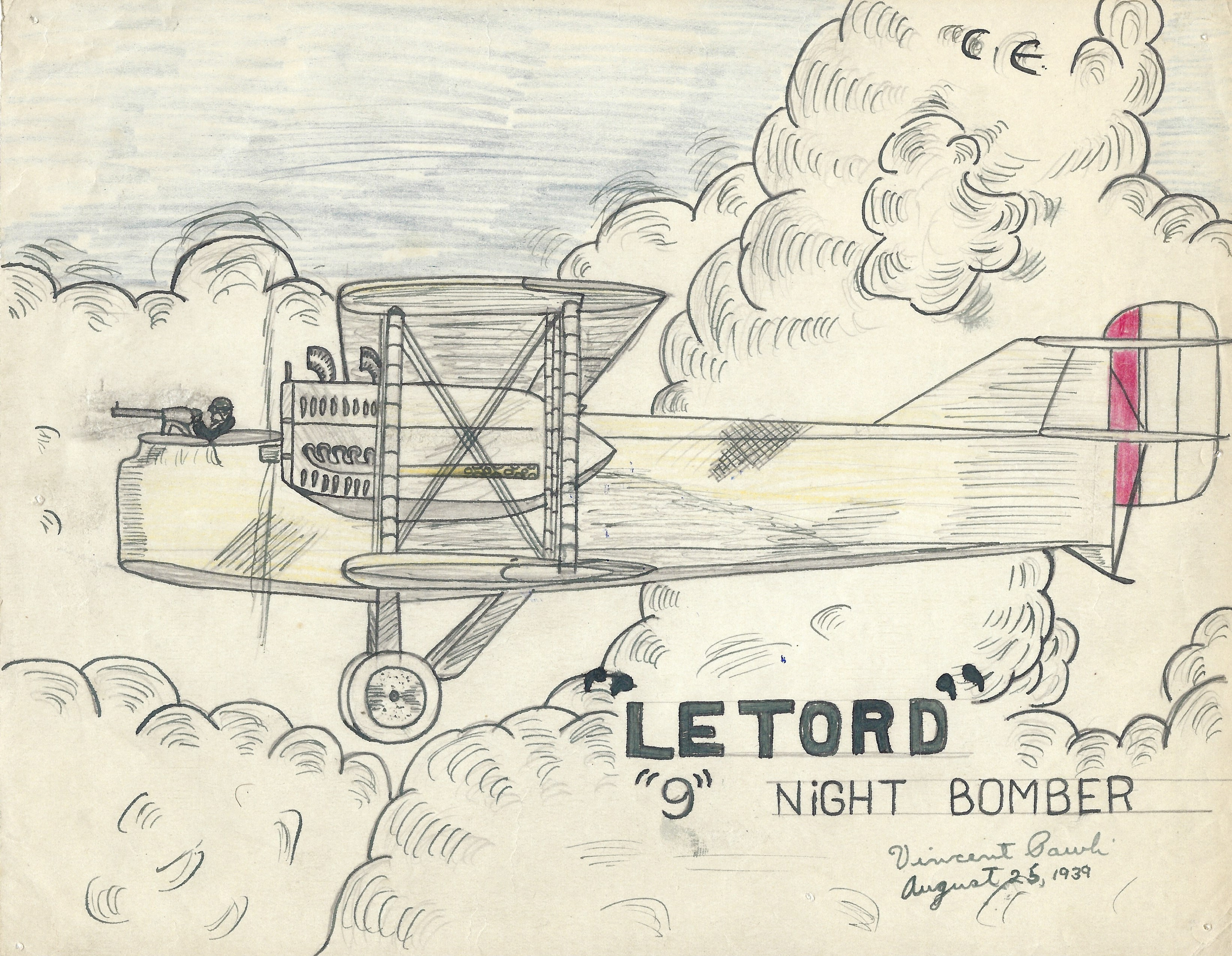
Artist Rendition of a Letord 9 Night Bomber
