= Morane-Saulnier S =

French WW1 bomber aircraft

General information
- Type: Bomber
- National origin: France
- Manufacturer: Morane-Saulnier
- Number built: 1

History
- First flight: February 1916

The Morane-Saulnier S, also known as MoS-10, was a large twin-engined biplane bomber designed and built in France around 1916. Powered by two 250 hp (190 kW) Renault 12E V-12 water-cooled piston engines, with Hazet type side radiators, the 'S' was given the STAé designation MoS-10 and serial MS-625.

== Variants ==
Morane-Saulnier S
company designation for 250 hp (190 kW) Renault 12E V-12 powered version
MoS.10 B.3
official French government STAe designation for the S
Morane-Saulnier Y
company designation for 150 hp (110 kW) Hispano-Suiza 8Aa V-8 powered version.
MoS.24 B.3
official French government STAe designation for the Y

== Specifications (S) ==
Data from Jane's Fighting Aircraft of World War I,

General characteristics

- Crew: 3
- Wingspan: 26 m (85 ft 4 in)
- Wing area: 108 m^{2} (1,160 sq ft)
- Gross weight: 3,000 kg (6,614 lb)
- Powerplant: 2 × Renault 12E V-12 water-cooled piston engines, 190 kW (250 hp) each
- Propellers: 2-bladed fixed-pitch propellers

Performance

- Maximum speed: 145 km/h (90 mph, 78 kn)

Armament

- Bombs: 1,200 kg (2,600 lb)
