= Couzinet 10 =

Arc-en-Ciel
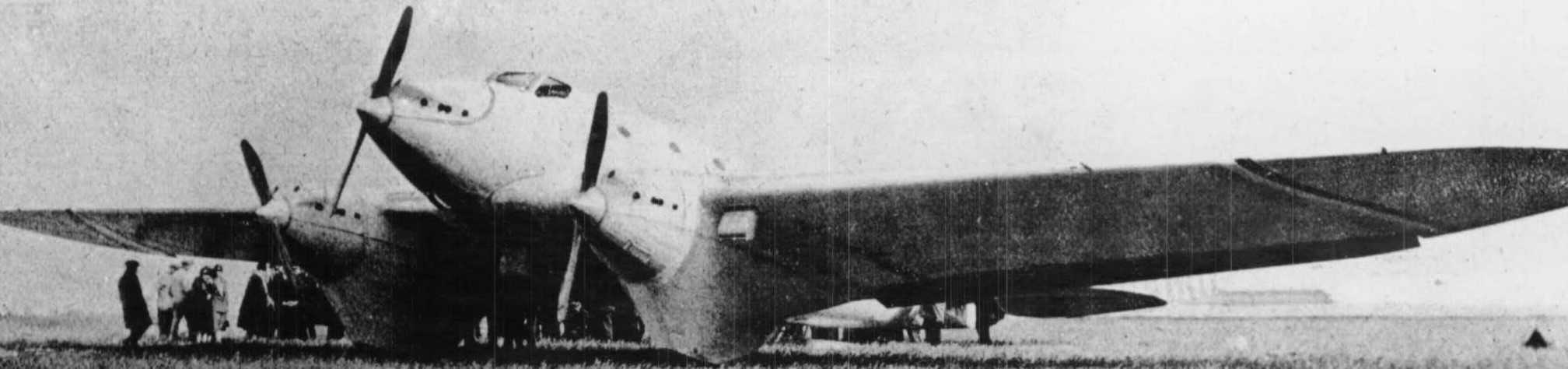

General information
- Type: Long range civil aircraft
- National origin: France
- Manufacturer: Société des Avions Couzinet
- Designer: René Couzinet
- Number built: 1

History
- First flight: 7 May 1928.

The Couzinet 70 Arc-en-Ciel ('Rainbow') was built as a first example of the three-engined, aerodynamically refined, cantilever low wing monoplane designer René Couzinet thought offered the safest long range passenger transport, for example on the South Atlantic route. Only one was completed, though other, similar aircraft of different sizes and powers followed.

== Design and development ==
The Couzinet 10 was the first of his designs to be built, though it was the result of his design study number 27. The Couzinet 20 and 30 and the Couzinet 40 and 70 were larger three-engined airplanes.

The rest of this article is about the Couzinet three-engine design. The one-piece wing of the Couzinet 10 was 900 mm (35.4 in) thick at the root, a thickness to chord ratio of 18%, and thinned continuously out to the tip. In plan each wing was trapezoidal, though long tips produced an approximately elliptical form. Long, narrow-chord ailerons filled most of the straight part of the trailing edges. It was entirely wooden, built around two box spars and plywood covered.

The Arc-en-Ciel was powered by three 170 kW (230 hp) Hispano-Suiza 8Ac water-cooled upright V8 engines. One was in the nose and the other two ahead of the wing leading edge, all within cowlings that followed the V8's cylinder heads and cooled with Lamblin radiators. Seven wing fuel tanks held a total of 6,200 L (1,400 imp gal; 1,600 US gal). The thickness of the wing at its root allowed crew to reach the engines in flight via a corridor 700 mm (27.6 in) high.

Behind the central engine the fuselage had a largely circular section, built up from frames with a maximum diameter of 2.4 m (7 ft 10 in) linked by stringers and ply-covered into a semi-monocoque structure. The enclosed cockpit was over the wing leading edge and behind it there was a windowed cabin with access through a starboard-side door. This contained two berths forward and, towards the back, tables for radio-operator and navigator, with a toilet further aft. The fin was integral with the body, rising slowly from it (a characteristic feature of Couzinet's designs) and carrying a pointed, curved, deep and narrow rudder. The Arc-en-Ciel's triangular plan tailplane, mounted near mid-fuselage, had a tapered elevator with a curved cut-out for rudder movement.

The Couzinet 10 had fixed, conventional landing gear, with mainwheels below the outer engines on V-struts from the wing spars and with rubber cord shock absorbers. Enclosed within fairings that reached back to the trailing edges, its track was 5.4 m (17 ft 9 in). A small tailskid was fitted on the fuselage below the tailplane's leading edge.

The Couzinet 10 was flown for the first time on 7 May 1928 by Maurice Drouhin. Further flights demonstrated well-coordinated controls and the ability to maintain altitude with the outer engine speeds reduced to 500 rpm and the central one at 1,500 rpm, compared with a maximum 1,900 rpm. The ability to fly safely on one central engine provided, Couzinet thought, safety if an outer engine failed. By July 1928 it had been converted into the Couzinet 11 with a central 450 kW (600 hp) Hispano 12Lb V12 engine. The Couzinet 11 is sometimes called the Couzinet 27, using the design study number as the type number, but the Couzinet 20 series were much smaller aircraft. The new engine installation raised the empty weight by 700 kg (1,500 lb) and slightly increased speed, ceiling and useful load. The Type 11 crashed at Orly on 8 August 1928 following intense aileron flutter at speed, killing both Drouhin and engineer André Lanet. A second airframe, intended to have three Hispano 12Lb engines, was barely started when it was destroyed with the first Couzinet 20 in the hangar fire at the workshops of the Société d'Aviation Letord at Meudon, France, on 17 February 1930.

== Variants ==
From Faix

Couzinet 10
Arc-en-Ciel 1, first Couzinet built.
Couzinet 11
Arc-en-Ciel 1bis, Couzinet 10 with a 450 kW (600 hp) Hispano 12Lb central engine.
Couzinet 12?
Arc-en-Ciel 2, three Hispano 12Lb, burned uncompleted in hangar fire.

== Specifications (Couzinet 10) ==
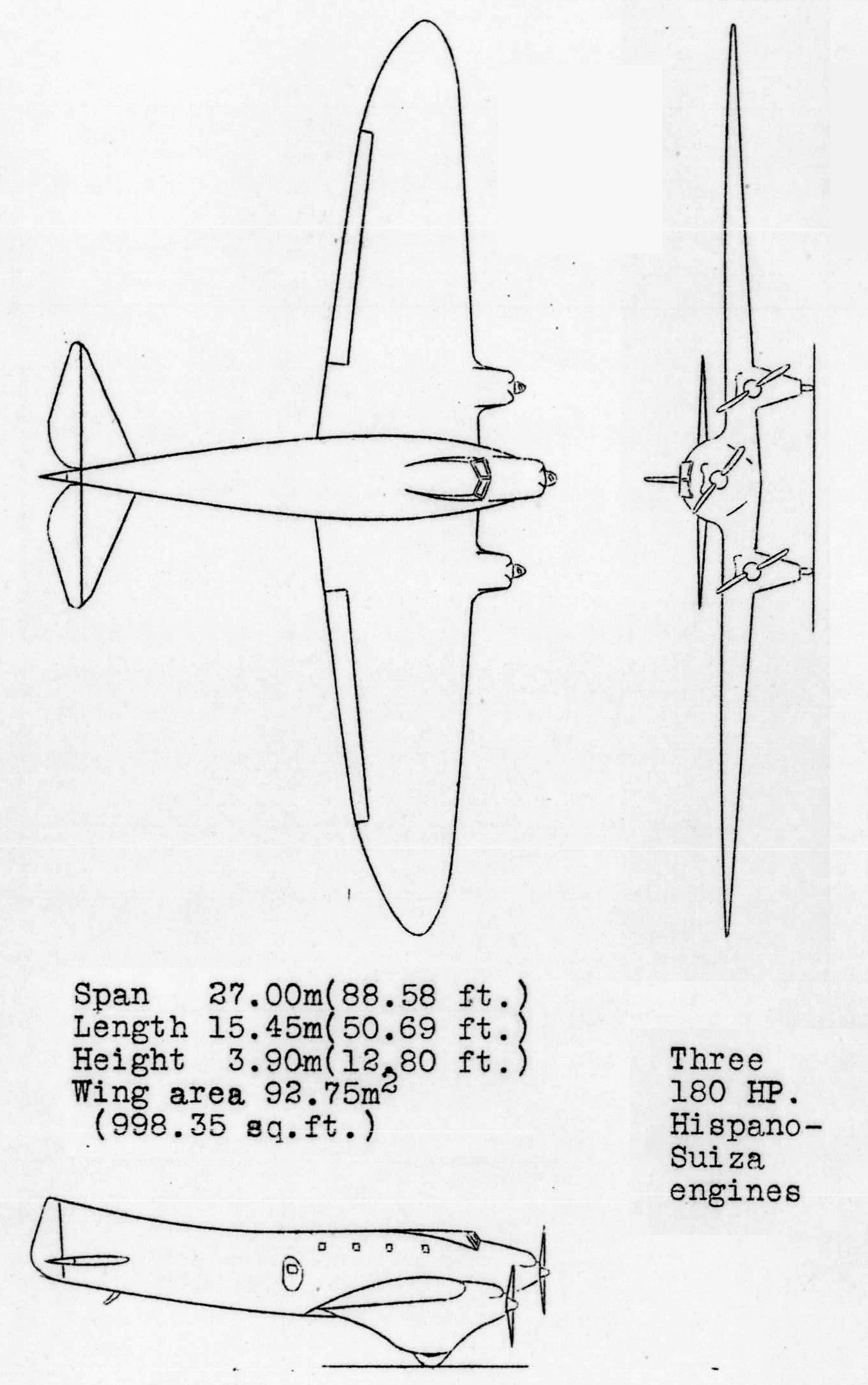
Couzinet 10 3-view drawing from NACA Aircraft Circular No.77

Data from Les Ailes, March 1928

General characteristics

- Crew: Four
- Length: 15.45 m (50 ft 8 in)
- Wingspan: 27 m (88 ft 7 in)
- Height: 3.90 m (12 ft 10 in)
- Wing area: 92.75 m^{2} (998.4 sq ft)
- Empty weight: 3,900 kg (8,598 lb)
- Gross weight: 9,000 kg (19,842 lb)
- Fuel capacity: 6,200 L (1,400 imp gal; 1,600 US gal)
- Powerplant: 3 × Hispano-Suiza 8Ac water-cooled V8, 130 kW (180 hp) each nominal, 170 kW (230 hp)
- Propellers: 2-bladed Chauvière, 2.60 m (8 ft 6 in) diameter wooden

Performance

- Maximum speed: 230 km/h (140 mph, 120 kn)
- Cruise speed: 180 km/h (110 mph, 97 kn)
- Range: 3,000 km (1,900 mi, 1,600 nmi)
- Service ceiling: 6,000 m (20,000 ft)
