= Morane-Saulnier T =

French WW1 bomber aircraft

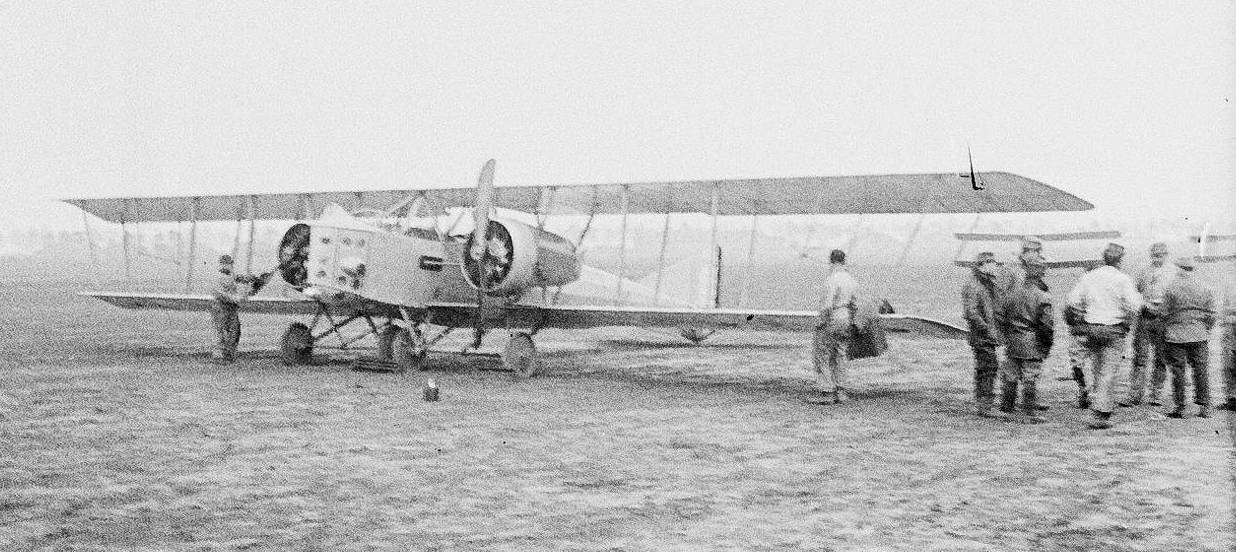

General information
- Type: Reconnaissance
- National origin: France
- Manufacturer: Morane-Saulnier
- Status: retired
- Primary user: Aéronautique Militaire
- Number built: 90

History
- Introduction date: 1 August 1917
- First flight: 1916
- Retired: Late 1917 or early 1918
- Developed from: Morane-Saulnier S

The Morane-Saulnier T (or Morane-Saulnier MoS.25 A.3) was a French biplane reconnaissance aircraft in 1916 and produced in small numbers during World War I.

== Design and development ==
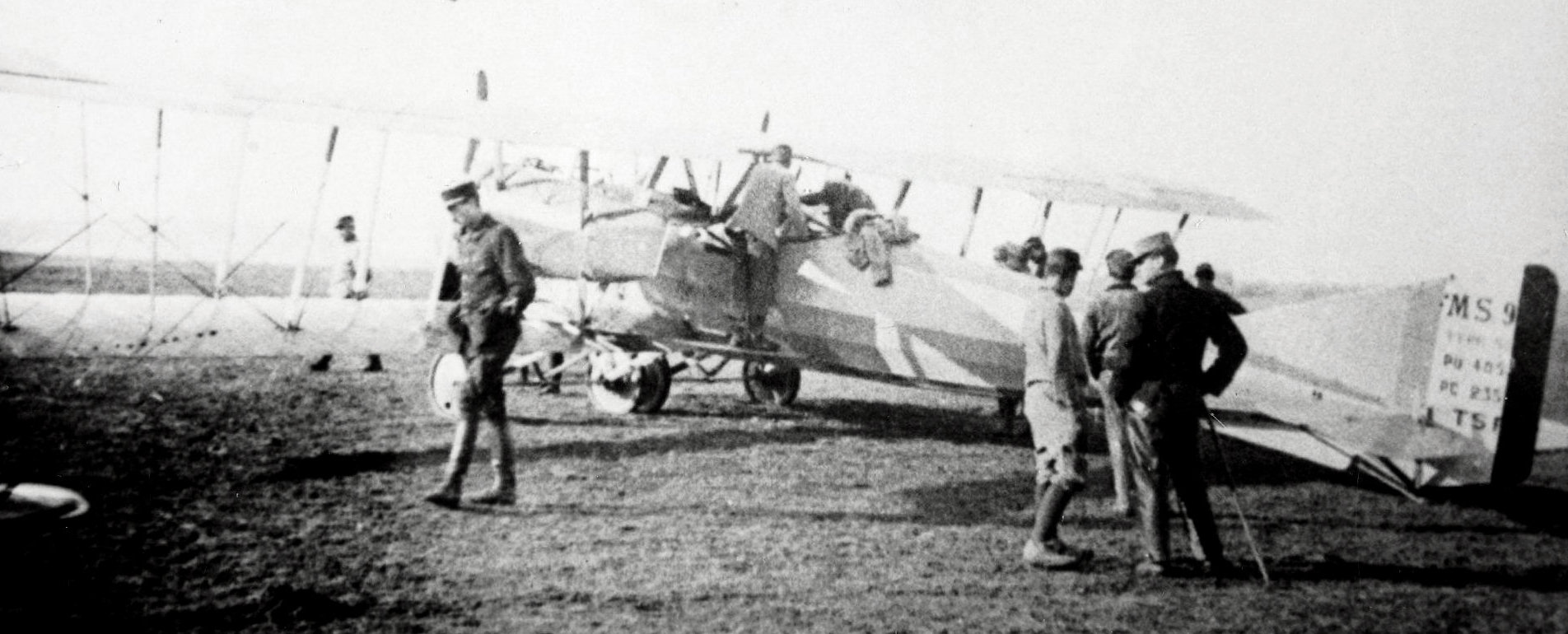
Morane-Saulnier T

The Morane-Saulnier T was a large, five-bay biplane of conventional configuration, with unstaggered wings of equal span. The tapered rear fuselage and large triangular vertical stabilizer were reminiscent of those used on Morane-Saulnier's smaller designs but would be a constant cause of problems throughout the types operational service despite attempts to fix the problems. The tractor engines were mounted in streamlined nacelles supported by struts suspended between the wings and the propellers on the Type T were sometimes fitted with large spinners. The landing gear consisted of two main units, each of which had two wheels joined by a long axle, plus a tailskid and an auxiliary nosewheel. Three open cockpits in tandem were provided, with one gunner in the nose, and another behind the wing, while the pilot was under the top wing.

Although the similar but larger Type S was designed as a bomber, the French Army ordered the type T in 1916 as a reconnaissance aircraft. Only one example of the preceding Type S bomber had been built, while an order was placed for 90 Morane-Saulnier T aircraft, although older sources suggest that production may have been cancelled before all of these were completed.

== Operators ==
France

- Aéronautique Militaire (no unit was equipped entirely with the MoS.T)
  - Escadrille C4
  - Escadrille C11
  - Escadrille C17
  - Escadrille C30
  - Escadrille C39
  - Escadrille C47

== Variants ==
Morane-Saulnier T
company designation for 80 hp (60 kW) Le Rhône 9C and 110 hp (82 kW) Le Rhône 9Jb powered versions
MoS-25 A.3
official French government STAe designation for the T

== Specifications (Morane-Saulnier T) ==
Data from Davilla, 1997, p.239

General characteristics

- Crew: 3
- Length: 10.50 m (34 ft 5 in)
- Wingspan: 17.65 m (57 ft 11 in)
- Wing area: 100 m^{2} (1,100 sq ft)
- Gross weight: 3,772 kg (8,316 lb)
- Powerplant: 2 × Le Rhône 9Jb 9-cylinder rotary engine, 82 kW (110 hp) each (production version, prototype had 80 hp (60 kW) Le Rhône 9C)
- Propellers: 2-bladed Wooden fixed pitch propellers

Performance

- Maximum speed: 136 km/h (85 mph, 73 kn)

Armament

- 2-4 × Lewis guns on gun rings for front and rear cockpits.
