= Letord Let.5 =

French WW1 reconnaissance bomber aircraft

Let.1 to Let.7
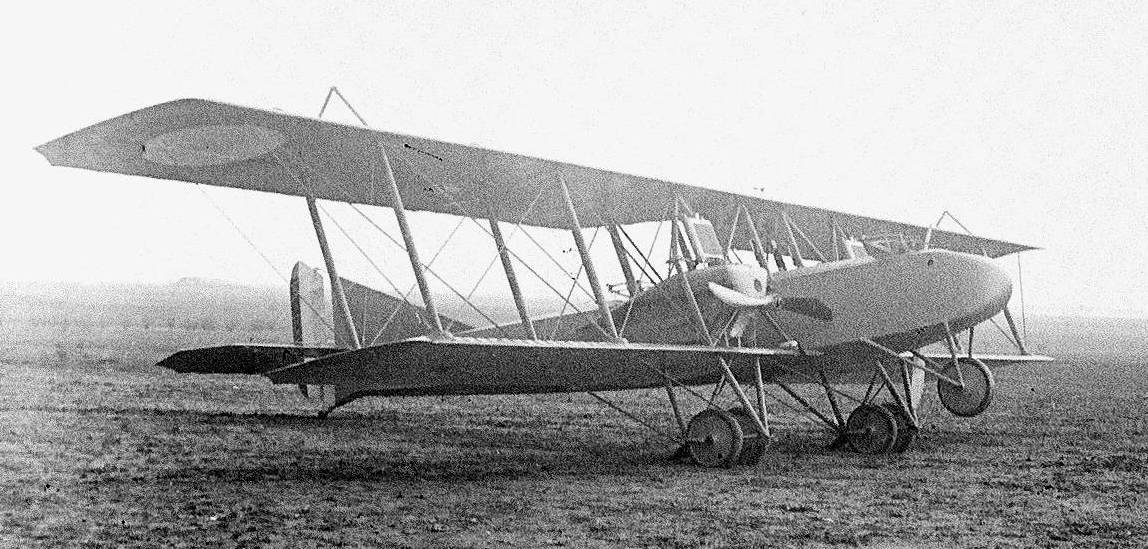
- a Letord Let.4

General information
- Type: Reconnaissance aircraft
- National origin: France
- Manufacturer: Établissements Letord of Meudon
- Designer: Émile Dorand, Emile Louis Letord
- Primary user: Aéronautique Militaire
- Number built: 250-300

History
- First flight: 1917

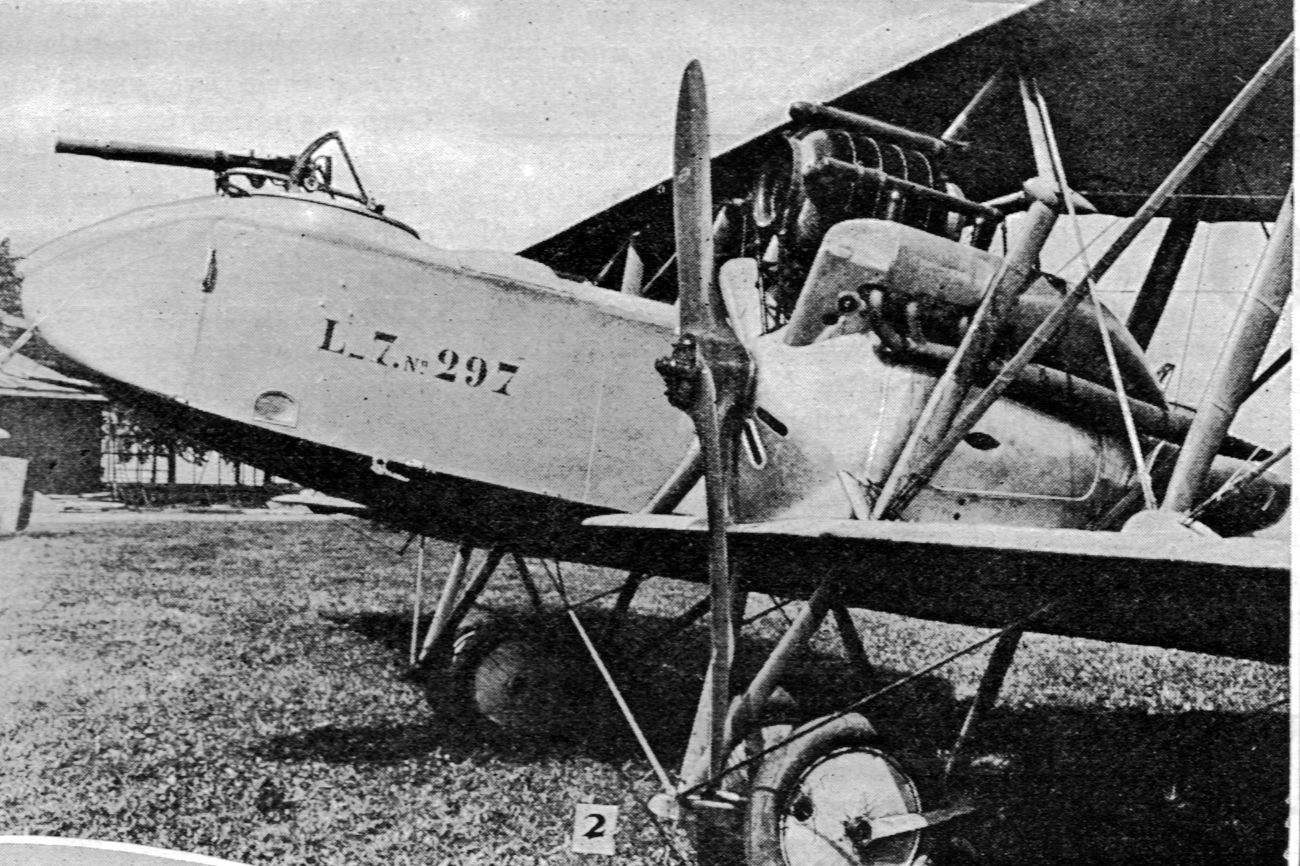
Letord Let.7

The Letord Let.5 was probably the most numerous of a family of 3-seat reconnaissance bombers, designed and built in France from 1916, originally to an A3 (reconnaissance aircraft 3-seat) specification from the STAé (Service Technique d'Aéronautique).

== Design and development ==
In early 1916 the contemporary reconnaissance aircraft of the Aéronautique Militaire, such as the Caudron G.6, Morane-Saulnier T and Salmson-Moineau SM.1 were proving to be less than sparkling in operations and testing. To provide a suitable replacement, the STAé, its Director Colonel Dorand and Établissements Letord, formulated the A3 specification and co-operated in the design of the only respondent, the Letord Let.1.

The Letord A3 reconnaissance bomber family, the Let.1 to Let.7, were essentially similar biplanes with, variously unequal span or equal span wings, with prominent and characteristic negative stagger on their wings, powered by two tractor engines in nacelles mounted short struts or directly on the lower wings and had a fixed tailskid undercarriage. Some aircraft were equipped with a strut-mounted nosewheel to protect the aircraft and its crew from "nosing-over" accidents while landing. The pilot sat in an open cockpit under the upper wing trailing edge, with a gunner in an open position immediately aft, and a third crew-member in an open position in the nose where he could act as gunner, observer, and bomb-aimer.

Aircraft were completed, variously, with equal span 4-bay wings or unequal span 3-bay wings with longer span upper wings braced by an A-frame king-post and wires. All the Letord reconnaissance bombers shared similar plywood covered wooden structure fuselages and wooden structure wings and conventional tail-unit.

== Operational history ==
The Letord reconnaissance bombers saw widespread service throughout the Aéronautique Militaire, from mid 1917, with 121 operational on the Western Front by November 1917. Most were no longer in front-line use by the Armistice in November 1918.

== Variants ==
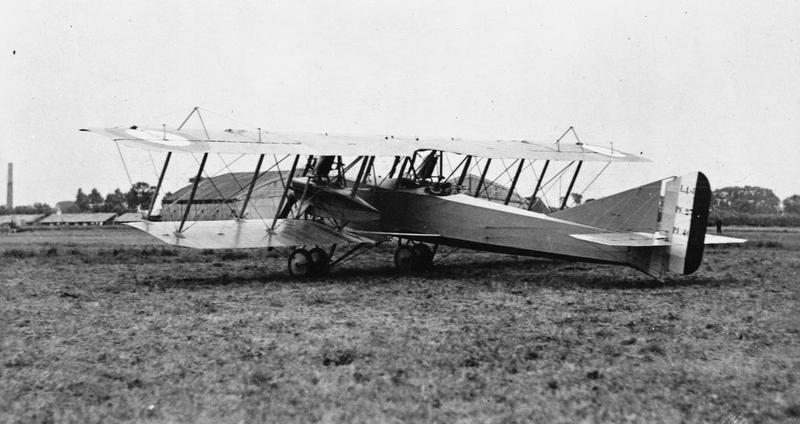
A Letord Let.1

Let.1 A.3
initial reconnaissance version, powered by two 150 hp (110 kW) Hispano-Suiza 8A engines and having a three bay wing.
Let.2 A.3
reconnaissance aircraft similar to Let.1, but powered by two 200 hp (150 kW) Hispano-Suiza 8Ba engines and also having a three bay wing.
Let.3 Bn.3
night bomber, powered by two 200 hp (150 kW) Hispano-Suiza 8Ba engines and having a four bay wing.
Let.4 A.3
reconnaissance aircraft also used as a bomber, powered by two 160 hp (120 kW) Lorraine-Dietrich 8A engines and having a three bay wing.
Let.5 A.3
reconnaissance aircraft powered by two 240 hp (180 kW) Lorraine-Dietrich 8B engines, having a three bay wing and missing the nosewheel.
Let.6 Ca.3
fighter based on the Let.3, armed with a 37 mm (1.5 in) cannon, powered by two 220 hp (160 kW) Hispano-Suiza 8Be engines and fitted with a four bay wing.
Let.7 Bn.3
night bomber, powered by two 275 hp (205 kW) Lorraine-Dietrich 8B engines and fitted with a four bay wing of increased span.

== Operators ==
France

- Aéronautique Militaire

== Specifications (Let.5) ==
Data from French aircraft of the First World War

General characteristics

- Crew: 3
- Length: 11.17 m (36 ft 8 in)
- Wingspan: 18.06 m (59 ft 3 in)
- Height: 3.66 m (12 ft 0 in)
- Wing area: 62.3 m^{2} (671 sq ft)
- Empty weight: 1,660 kg (3,660 lb)
- Gross weight: 2,445 kg (5,390 lb)
- Powerplant: 2 × Lorraine-Dietrich 8Fb V-8 water-cooled piston engines, 180 kW (240 hp) each
- Propellers: 2-bladed wooden fixed-pitch propellers

Performance

- Maximum speed: 170 km/h (110 mph, 92 kn) at 2,000 m (6,600 ft)

152 km/h (94 mph) at 3,000 m (9,800 ft)

- Range: 455 km (283 mi, 246 nmi)
- Endurance: 3 hours
- Service ceiling: 4,900 m (16,100 ft)
- Time to altitude: 2,000 m (6,600 ft) in 10 minutes

4,000 m (13,000 ft) in 20 minutes

Armament

- Guns: Up to 4 7.70 mm (0.303 in) Lewis machine-guns on single or double T.O.3 flexible mounts.
- Bombs: 130–150 kg (290–330 lb) of bombs

== See also ==
Related lists

- List of military aircraft of France
- List of bomber aircraft
- List of World War I Entente aircraft

== Bibliography ==
- Cony, Christophe (August 1997). "Aviateur d'Observation en 14/18 (3ème partie et fin)". Avions: Toute l'aéronautique et son histoire (in French) (53): 16–20. ISSN 1243-8650.
