= Dorand DO.1 =

DO.1
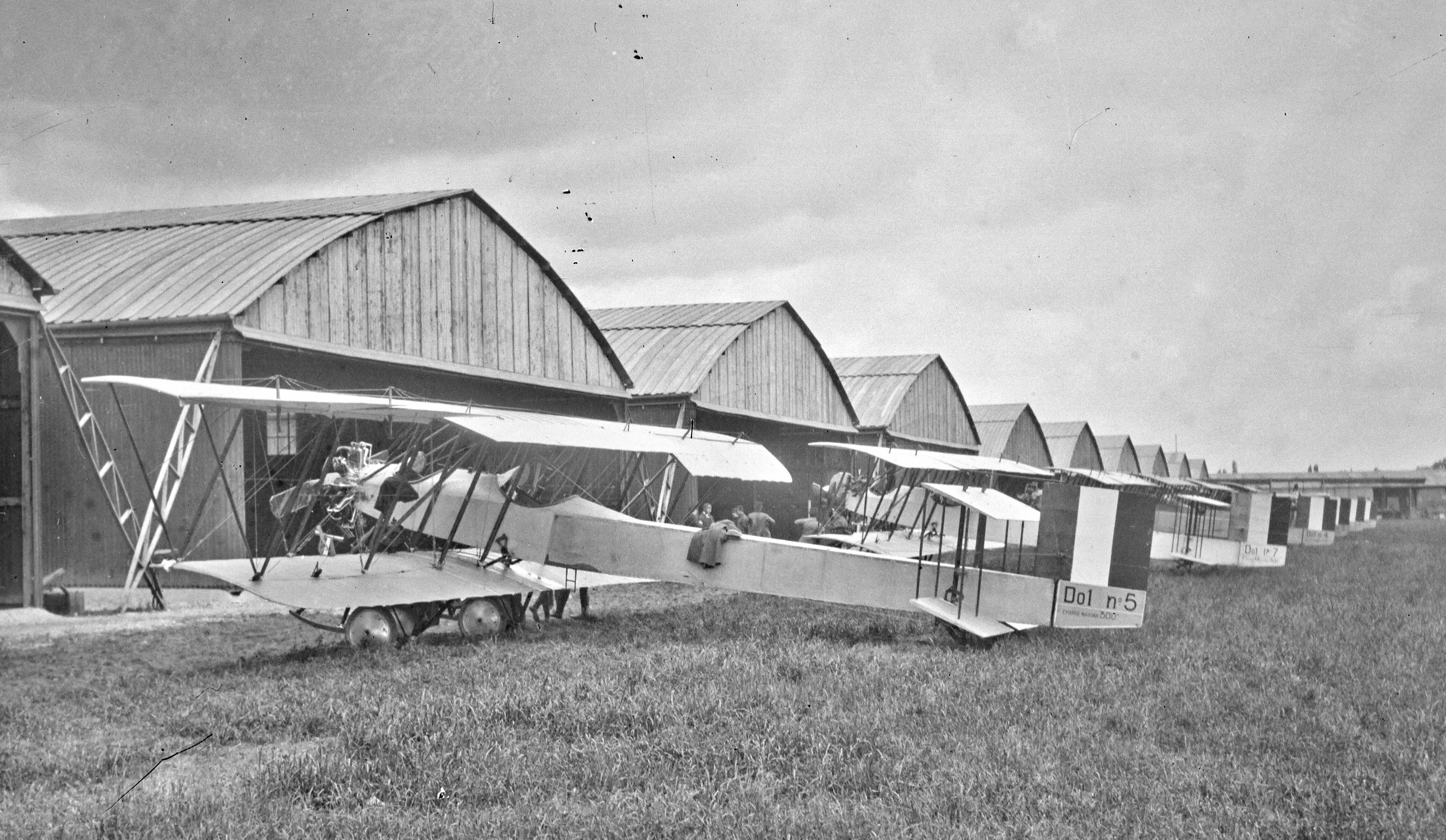
- Dorand DO.1s in 1914.

General information
- Type: Armoured reconnaissance biplane
- National origin: France
- Designer: Émile Dorand
- Primary user: Aéronautique Militaire
- Number built: at least 6

History
- First flight: 1913

The Dorand DO.1 was an armoured reconnaissance-bomber designed and built in France from 1913. A small number were used operationally as a stop-gap measure.

== Design and development ==
General Bernard of the Aéronautique Militaire issued a specification for an armoured reconnaissance-bomber, with response from Blériot, Breguet, Clément-Bayard, Deperdussin, Ponnier, Voisin and Dorand.

Capitaine Émile Dorand's offering, the DO.1, was an un-equal span biplane of wooden construction and fabric covering, with a slender square-section fuselage supported on struts between the negatively staggered mainplanes. Power was supplied by an 85 hp (63 kW) Anzani 6-cylinder air-cooled radial engine, mounted in the nose. The pilot sat in an open cockpit under the trailing edge of the upper mainplane and the mechanic / observer sat in an open cockpit forward of the wings, protected from small arms fire by 90 kg (200 lb) armour plates. Control was through conventional ailerons and rudder with an all-flying biplane tailplane providing pitch control. The undercarriage consisted of paired mainwheels mounted on struts, with skids between each pair of wheels and a tail-skid at the end of the fuselage. The DO.1 was found to be easy to fly, but seriously under-powered, resulting in a very short service life.

Later, in 1916, the DO.1 was resurrected and re-designed as the Dorand AR.1 and AR.2, retaining many of the features of the DO.1 with a new fuselage and much more powerful engine.

== Operational history ==
Do.1s were issued to Escadrille DO14 at Belfort on 14 December 1914, which used them in support of the 7th Armée at Hartmanswillerkopf and Rickhackerhoff in Belgium. DO14 replaced its DO.1s with Maurice Farman MF.11 in early 1915. Six more DO.1s were issued to Escadrille DO22 at Villacoublay on 23 August 1914, flying operations in support of the 4th Armée in the Battle of the Marne. DO22 replaced its DO.1s with Maurice Farman MF.11 by 14 November 1914 and was re-designated Escadrille MF22. A few DO.1s were assigned to Escadrille V14 for escort duties but were quickly withdrawn from operations.

In 1913 a DO.1 flown by Labouchère flew 1,800 km (1,100 mi) and a group of six aircraft led by Capitaine Leclerc flew 1,400 km (870 mi) in six stages.

== Operators ==
France

- Aéronautique Militaire
  - Escadrille DO14
  - Escadrille DO22
  - Escadrille V14

== Specifications (DO.1) ==
Data from Precursoraviation: The Dorand Do 1 - 1913, Aviafrance:Dorand DO.1

General characteristics

- Crew: 2
- Length: 10.07 m (33 ft 0 in)
- Wingspan: 15 m (49 ft 3 in)
- Height: 3.3 m (10 ft 10 in)
- Wing area: 50 m^{2} (540 sq ft)
- Empty weight: 700 kg (1,543 lb)
- Gross weight: 1,000 kg (2,205 lb)
- Powerplant: 1 × Anzani 10-cylinder air-cooled radial piston engine, 63 kW (85 hp)
- Propellers: 2-bladed wooden fixed-pitch propeller

Performance

- Maximum speed: 108 km/h (67 mph, 58 kn)
- Endurance: 4
- Service ceiling: 8,400 m (27,600 ft)
- Time to altitude: 4,500 m (14,800 ft) in 16 minutes
- Takeoff run: 90 m (300 ft)
- Landing: 95 m (312 ft)
