= Couzinet 33 =

1930s French aircraft

Couzinet 33 Biarritz
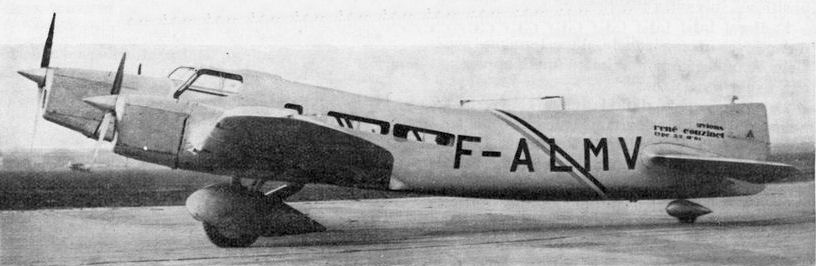

General information
- Type: Long-range commercial monoplane
- Manufacturer: Société des Avions René Couzinet
- Designer: René Couzinet
- Number built: 2

History
- First flight: 25 November 1931

The Couzinet 33 Biarritz was a French long-range monoplane built by René Couzinet in the early 1930s.

== Design ==
The Couzinet 33 was made of wood, with a thick cantilever wing with thickness of 60 cm (24 in) at the wing roots; with no dihedral on the upper surface. The wing main-spar was continuous from wing-tip to wing-tip; and the rear spars attached to the fuselage sides. The aircraft was covered with birch plywood, with the fuselage thinning to the rear, forming the characteristic tail of a René Couzinet signature aircraft.

Couzinet designed the plane when he was 27 years old with only 28 flight hours.

== Operational history ==
The biarritz made its first flight in November 1931, clocking up 27 hours flying before departing on a flight from Paris to Nouméa. From 6 March 1932 to 5 April 1932 Emile Munch, Max Dévé and Charles Verneilh flew the Biarritz from France to New Caledonia, the first time a direct flight had succeeded. On arrival at Nouméa the aircraft crashed and was destroyed.

== Biarritz No.2 ==
After the wreckage of the Biarritz was shipped back to France, a second aircraft was built using salvageable parts of the first. This aircraft set off on a non-stop flight from Paris to Algiers on 30 October 1933, flown by Charles Verneilh, but crashed in fog at Blaisy-Bas in the Côte-d'Or.

== Specifications ==
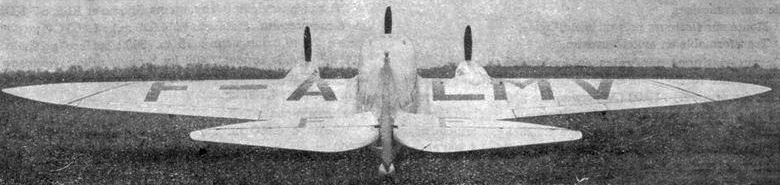
rear view

Data from Aviafrance : Couzinet 33 'Biarritz', Aviafrance : Couzinet 33 'Biarritz' n ° 2

General characteristics

- Crew: 4
- Length: 11.73 m (38 ft 6 in)
- Wingspan: 16.16 m (53 ft 0 in)
- Height: 2.75 m (9 ft 0 in)
- Wing area: 34.4 m^{2} (370 sq ft)
- Empty weight: 1,600 kg (3,527 lb)

Biarritz No.2: 1,722 kg (3,796 lb)

- Gross weight: 3,500 kg (7,716 lb)

Biarritz No.2: 3,090 kg (6,810 lb)

- Powerplant: 3 × de Havilland Gipsy III 4-cyl inverted air-cooled in-line piston engines, 89 kW (120 hp) each

Biarritz No.2: 3x de Havilland Gipsy Major 4-cyl inverted air-cooled in-line piston engines 140 hp (100 kW) each

- Propellers: 2-bladed fixed-pitch metal prop[ellers

Performance

- Maximum speed: 260 km/h (160 mph, 140 kn)

Biarritz No.2: 280 km/h (170 mph; 150 kn)

- Cruise speed: 220 km/h (140 mph, 120 kn)
- Range: 4,500 km (2,800 mi, 2,400 nmi)

Biarritz No.2: 4,900 km (3,000 mi; 2,600 nmi)

- Service ceiling: 5,500 m (18,000 ft)
