= Arc-en-Ciel International School =

International Baccalaureate school in Lomé, Togo

- French: Ecole Internationale Arc-en-Ciel
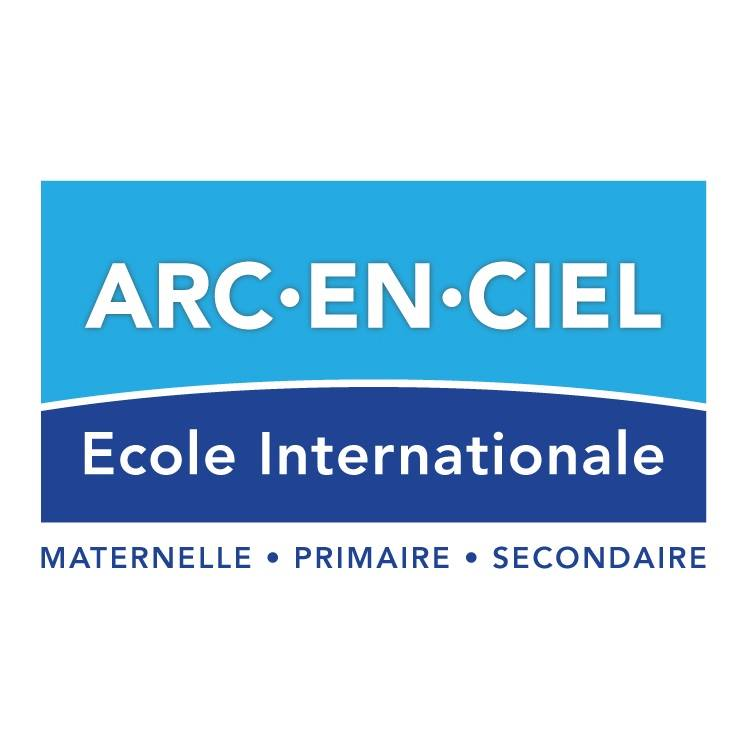

Location
- Coordinates: 6.12317°N 1.20450°E

Information
- Established: 1986
- Language: French; English

Arc-en-Ciel International School (French: Ecole Internationale Arc-en-Ciel) is an International Baccalaureate (IB) school in Lome, Togo. It was created in 1986 and offers education from nursery to high school in French and English language tracks to 500 students of more than 40 nationalities.

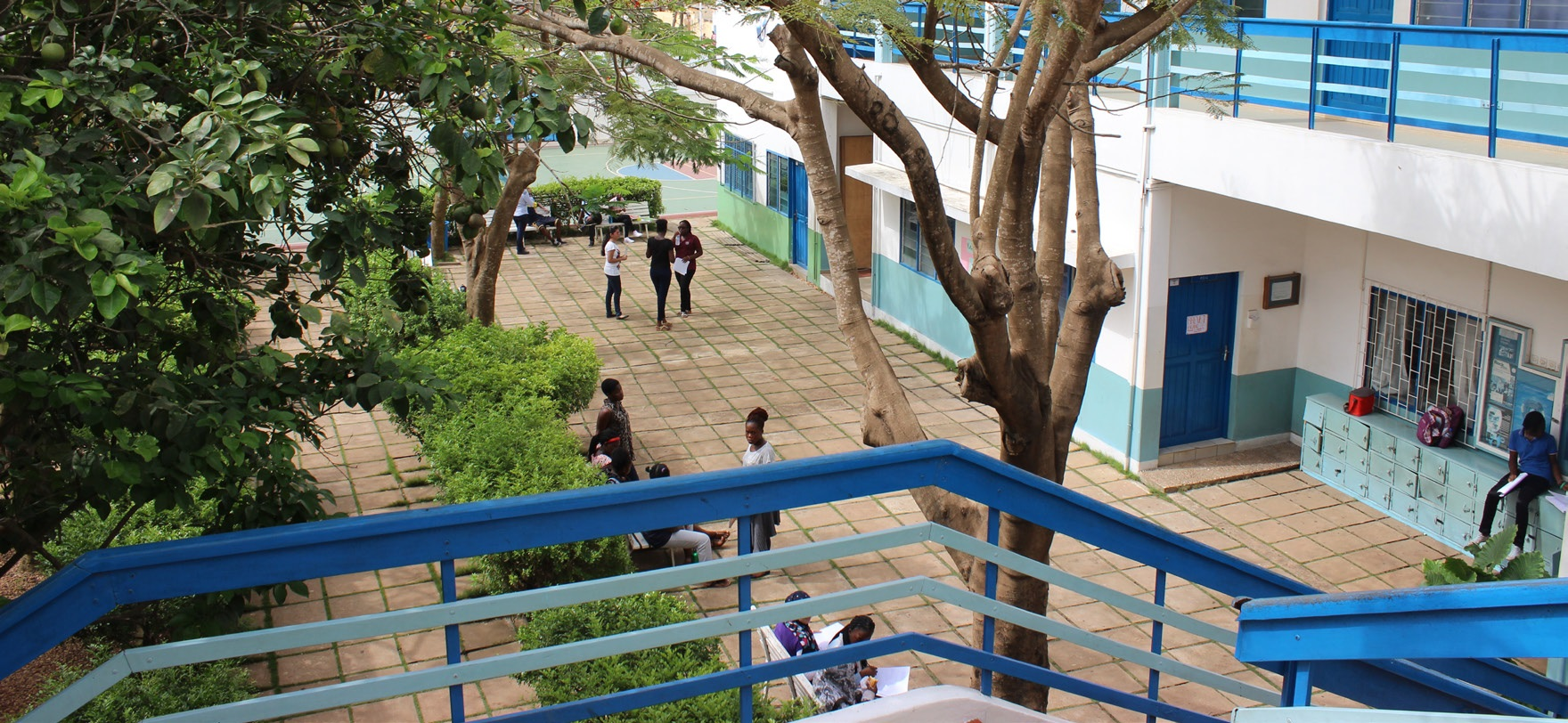
Middle-high campus

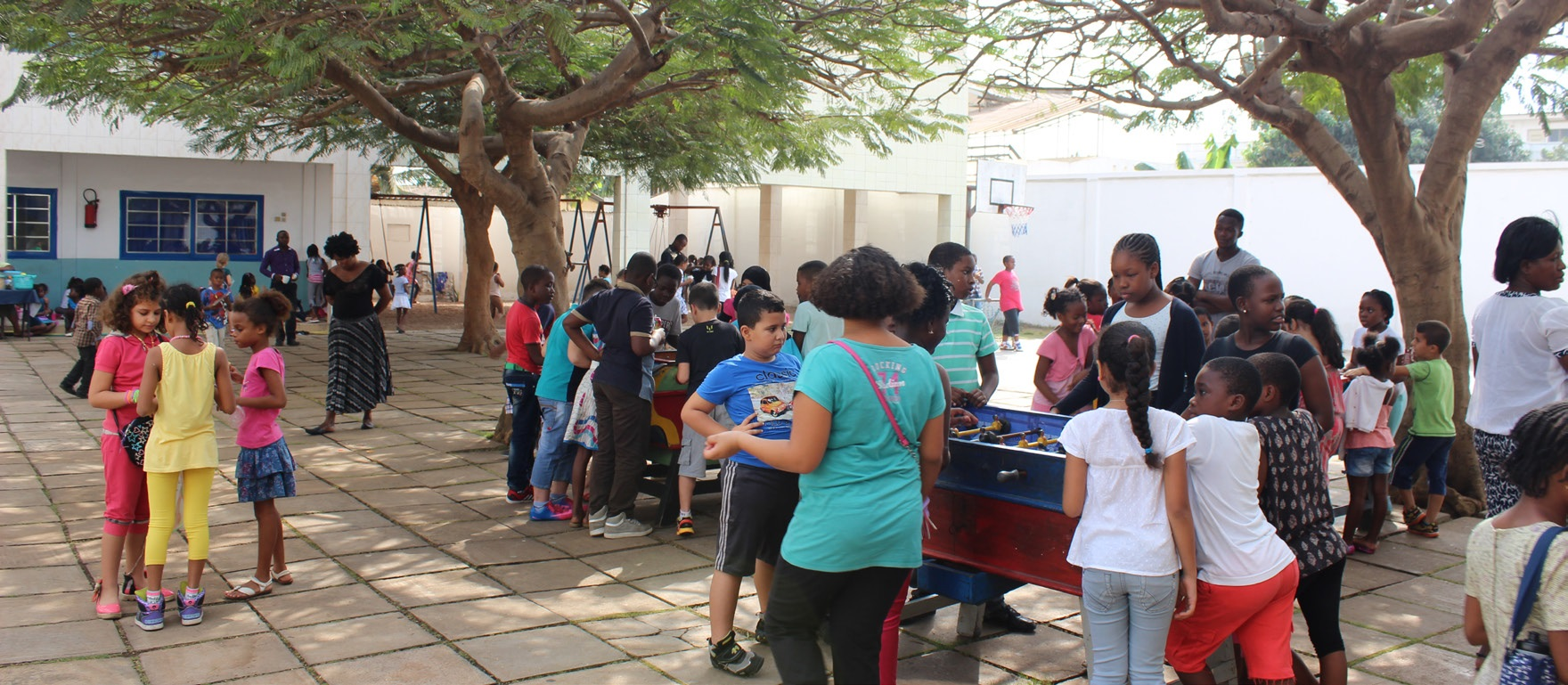
Primary campus

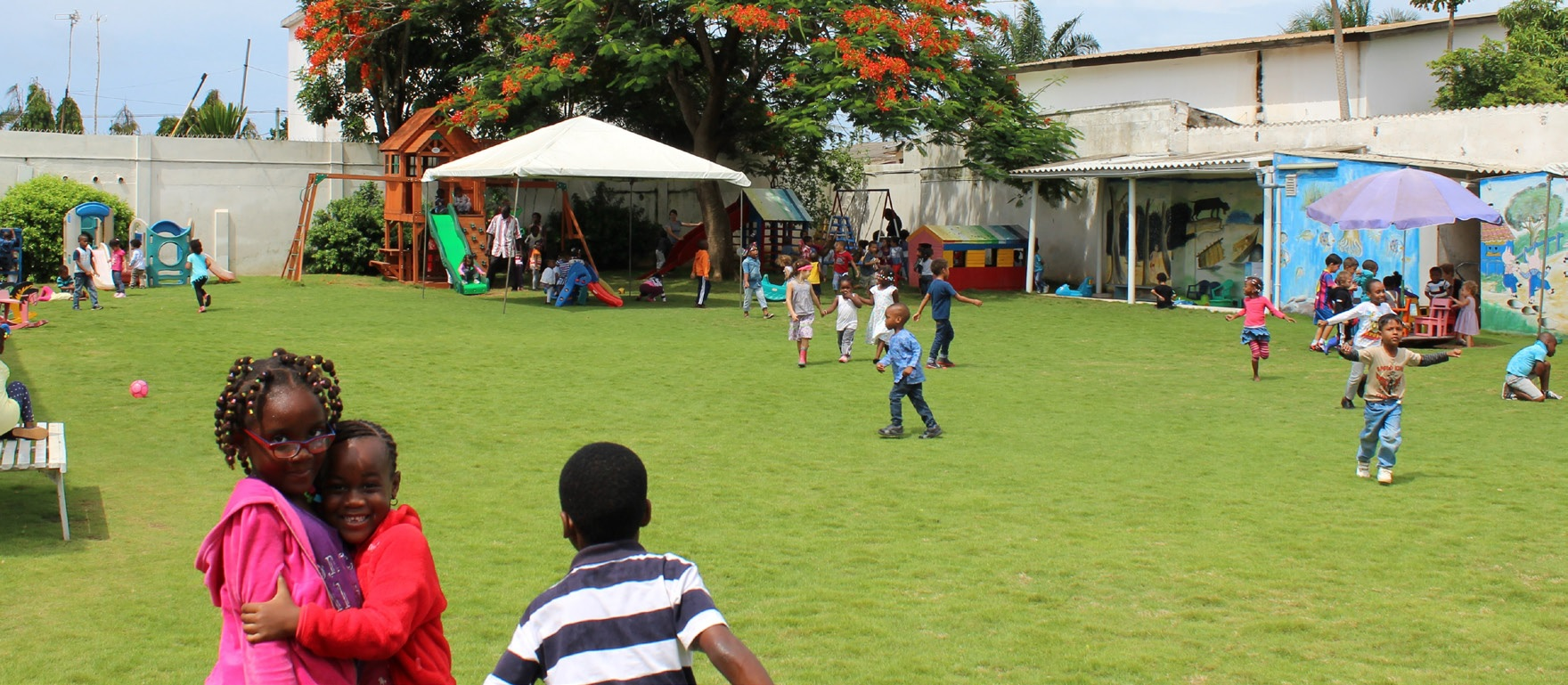
Arc-en-Ciel kindergarten campus

Arc-en-Ciel was first authorized to offer the IB curriculum in 1999. It offers the IB Diploma Programme for high school, the IB Middle Years Programme for middle school and the IB Primary Years Programme for kindergarten and primary. It is a member of the UNESCO Schools Association and the European Council of International Schools.

The school offers boarding facilities for students age 10 and above.
