= Couzinet 20 =

Low-powered, three-engined aircraft

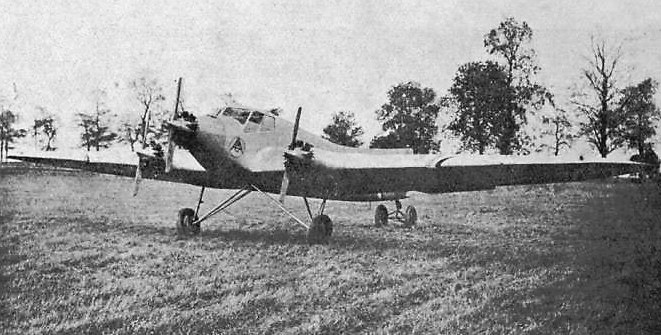

General information
- Type: Postal or touring aircraft
- National origin: France
- Manufacturer: Société des Avions René Couzinet
- Designer: René Couzinet
- Number built: 2

History
- First flight: October–November 1930

The Couzinet 20 was a low-powered, three-engined aircraft developed in France in 1929, intended primarily for airmail service. Designed with a versatile layout, it could alternatively be configured to accommodate up to three passengers or adapted for use as a medical transport aircraft. Although three different engine types were tested across the program, only two airframes were constructed.

== Design ==
The Couzinet 20 strongly resembled the earlier Couzinet 10 Arc-en-Ciel but was markedly smaller, with a span reduced by about 40%. The smaller dimensions meant there was no longer access to the outboard engines in flight (both types were tri-motors) but the Type 20 was more advanced in having a retractable undercarriage. Both had Couzinet's characteristic fin, formed from the body rather than joined to it.

It was a low wing cantilever monoplane. Its wing was entirely wooden, built around two box spars and plywood covered, with a thick section which thinned continuously from root to tip. In plan each wing was trapezoidal, though long tips produced an approximately elliptical form. Long narrow-chord ailerons, each divided into two, were placed at the outer ends of the trapezoidal part.

The Type 20's two outer nine-cylinder, 30 kW (40 hp) radial Salmson 9AD engines were mounted just ahead of the wing leading edge with their cylinders exposed for cooling; the third was in the nose. Each had a pointed spinner and fairings behind the engine. The later Types 21 and 22 had more powerful radials, the five-cylinder, 63 kW (85 hp) Walter Vega I and the seven-cylinder, 71 kW (95 hp) Salmson 7Ac respectively. The fuselage was a ply-skinned semi-monocoque structure with close-spaced frames and stringers. It narrowed aft and the upper part rose upward to form a narrow vertical edge which formed the very broad fin; the fuselage underside curved upwards in parallel. A cantilever tailplane carried full-span elevators and a rather pointed rudder ran down to the keel via a gap between them.

The crew's enclosed cabin, placed on the wing leading edge, seated two side-by-side. The cabin and the rest of the interior were accessed through a righthand side door over the wing. Behind the cabin there was a small baggage space and behind that a compartment with four windows a side. This could accommodate three passengers or two stretcher cases with a doctor. Unfurnished it could carry 200 kg (440 lb) of mail.

The Type 20 had retractable landing gear. Each mainwheel was on a vertical oleo strut under the engine and hinged on a bent axle and a drag strut, both tubular. They were retracted by lever-operated cables into the engine cowlings, with the axle and drag strut lying on the wing underside. In the cockpit there were pointers indicating the undercarriage position and a quick release to lower it. The mainwheels had brakes and the tailwheel castered.

== Development ==
Construction of the Couzinet 20 began in May 1929 and it was almost ready for flight in January 1930 but was destroyed along with the Arc-en-Ciel 2 in a hangar fire at the workshops of the Société d'Aviation Letord at Meudon, France, on 17 February. A second example was built and flew for the first time in the first week of November 1930. It was on display soon after at the 12th Paris Salon and on 31 May in demonstrations of touring aircraft organised by the French Aero Club Association. It visited Bourget in September to meet the Arc-en-ciel at the end of its six-hour flight from Algiers.

Meanwhile, the Type 21 with Walter engines first flew in February 1931. These engines were later replaced with 95 hp Salmsons to become the Type 22, which was flown for the first time in December 1932. General Louis Couhé proposed to fly it to Saigon in January 1933. but there is no record of this flight. In November the Type 22, still owned by Couhé and described as having 40 hp Salmsons, had its engine mountings lengthened to adjust the centre of gravity and improve handling.

== Variants ==
Type 20
3 × 30 kW (40 hp) Salmson 9AD
Type 21
3 × 63 kW (85 hp) Walter Vega I
Type 22
Type 21 converted to 3 × 71 kW (95 hp) Salmson 7Ac

== Specifications (Type 20) ==
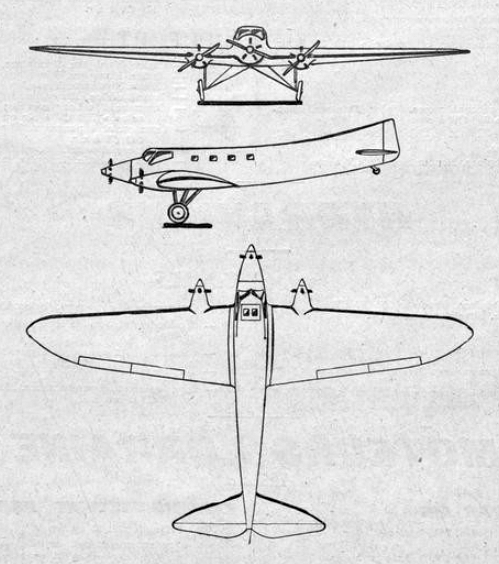
Couzinet 20

Data from Les Ailes December 1930

General characteristics

- Crew: Two, pilot and engineer
- Capacity: Three passengers
- Length: 10.50 m (34 ft 5 in)
- Wingspan: 16.06 m (52 ft 8 in)
- Height: 2.60 m (8 ft 6 in)
- Wing area: 31.50 m^{2} (339.1 sq ft)
- Empty weight: 620 kg (1,367 lb)
- Gross weight: 1,540 kg (3,395 lb)
- Powerplant: 3 × Salmson 9AD 9-cylinder radial, 30 kW (40 hp) each
- Propellers: 2-bladed

Performance

- Maximum speed: 165 km/h (103 mph, 89 kn)
- Cruise speed: 101 km/h (63 mph, 55 kn) . Flight gives 150 km/h (93 mph; 81 kn)
- Range: 2,000 km (1,200 mi, 1,100 nmi) . Flight gives 900 km (560 mi) at 150 km/h (93 mph; 81 kn)
- Service ceiling: 3,000 m (9,800 ft) (1,000 m (3,300 ft) with one wing motor stopped)
