= Arcenciel =

Arcenciel (stylised as arcenciel), is a Lebanese non-profit, apolitical and non-confessional NGO created in response to the Lebanese civil war in 1985. It participates in sustainable development and was recognized as a public utility in 1995 by the Lebanese Presidential Decree N⁰7541.

Arcenciel’s main goal is to work with and support people living with disabilities or other physical and psychological difficulties. In 1994, arcenciel created the division “Acces et Droit” ('Rights and Access') within the Ministry of Social Affairs It does that within the framework of 5 core programs, each designed to help Arcenciel to actively participate in Lebanon’s sustainable development.

== Core programs ==
=== Agriculture and environment ===
With a plot of land 2.3km2 in size at Domain do Taanayel, managed by arcenciel, arcenciel is able to work on innovating new techniques for organic farming, saving energy and water for the benefit of present and future generations.

=== Mobility and health ===
Mobility and Health participates in the social reintegration of people in need, focusing on those living with disabilities. It supports people through their entire recovery process by providing diverse health consultations, distributing mobility equipment and adapting living spaces. In 1994, Mobility and Health created the division “Accès et Droit” within the Ministry of Social Affairs. The division single-handedly passed governmental policy, Law 220, that financially and socially protects all Lebanese disabled people.

=== Social support ===
This program aims to support and help the community on the ground by identifying the difficulties and needs they are struggling with. It runs an employment office, which acts as a social support system and comprises a network of clothing and furniture boutiques focused on integrating people back into society.

=== Tourism ===
The ecolodge, Khan el Maksoud and Domaine de Taanayel have become part of Lebanese tourism by offering an experience of rural living with accommodation, restaurants and activities while protecting Lebanese heritage and the country’s natural resources.

=== Youth empowerment ===
Youth Support helps at risk youth develop their emotional, social and psychological capacities. The program offers a range of activities, essential to youth empowerment: sports and recreation, arts and culture, education. Established in 2001, cirquenciel became the first circus school in Lebanon. It promotes intercultural dialogue and help at risk youths reintegrate educational and professional paths.

== Arcenciel USA ==
Arcenciel USA, is a nonprofit organization providing a bridge for US based individuals, institutions, and corporations to support Lebanon’s underprivileged and marginalized communities, regardless of religion, political affiliation or nationality.

== Arcenciel France ==
Arcenciel France consults and recruits for Lebanon through academic and professional trainings. Processmed supports social entrepreneurship in the Mediterranean and provides the opportunity for French, Tunisians, Lebanese students and social entrepreneurs to collaborate in Tunis, Beyrouth and Lyon on strategic development and business development.
