= Couzinet 30 =

Light transport aircraft/mailplane

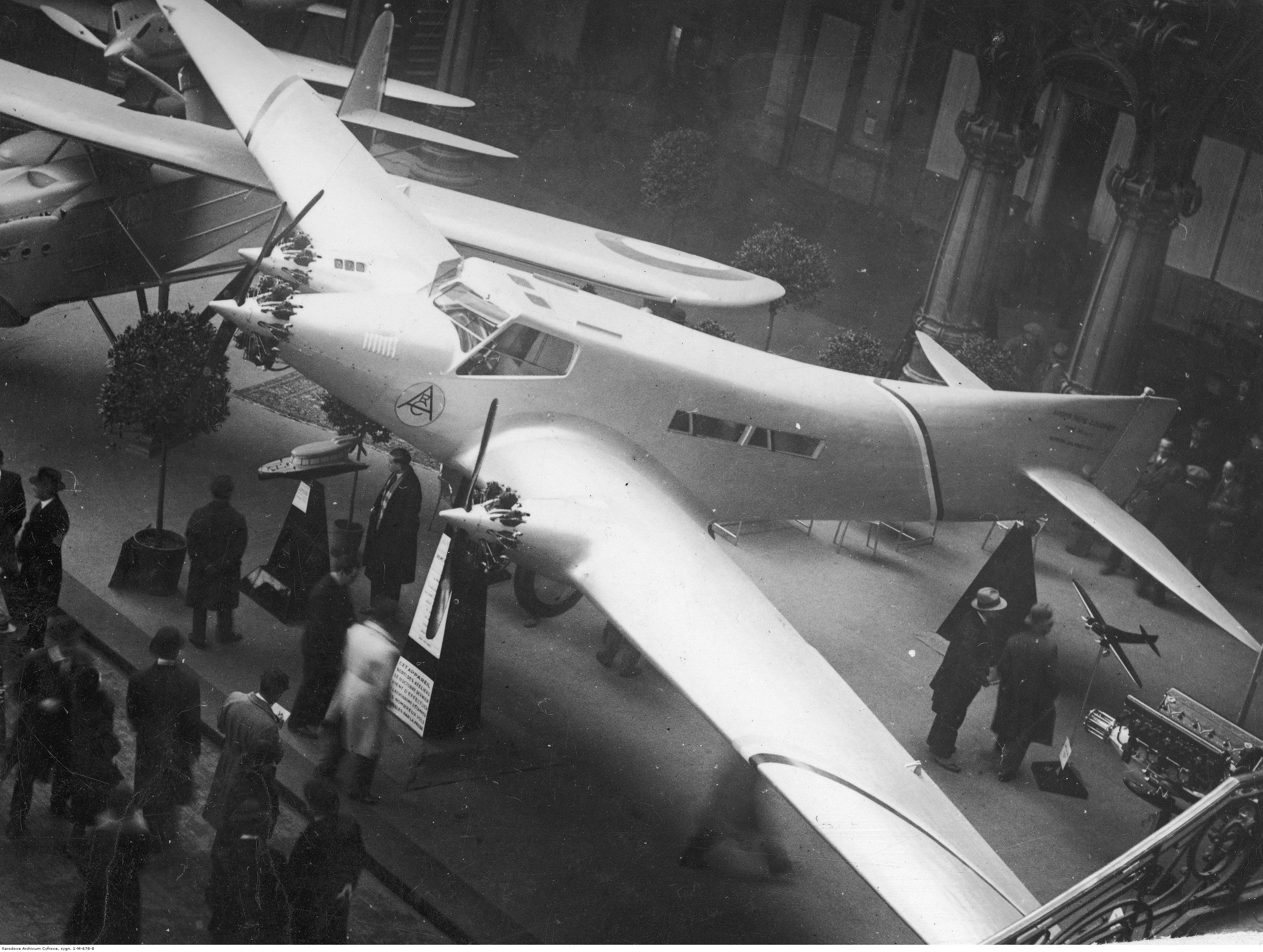

General information
- Type: light transport / mailplane
- National origin: France
- Manufacturer: Société des Avions René Couzinet
- Designer: René Couzinet
- Primary user: René Couzinet
- Number built: 1

History
- First flight: 21 October 1930

The Couzinet 30 was a light transport aircraft / mailplane designed and built in France in 1930 at Société des Avions René Couzinet.

== Design and development ==
Following closely the design characteristics of the Couzinet Arc en Ciel and other Couzinet tri-motor transport aircraft, the Couzinet 30 was a low-wing cantilever monoplane with fixed spatted undercarriage, three engines mounted on the fuselage nose and in wing nacelles, as well as the characteristic up-swept fuselage, common to most of Couzinet's designs. Intended primarily as a mailplane the Couzinet 30 could also be fitted with three or four passenger seats in the cabin.

Built of wood, with metal fittings the Couzinet 30 had a fixed tail-wheel undercarriage which could be fitted with spats throughout. Control was by conventional controls with ailerons, elevator and rudder. The birch ply skinned ailerons were in two parts, with one connected to the pilots controls and the other connected by an articulated joint, to prevent jamming in the event of wing flexure.

Power was supplied by three 30 kW (40 hp) Salmson 9AD radial engines in the nose of the fuselage and nacelles on each wing. Production aircraft were intended to have retractable main undercarriage and 63 kW (85 hp) Walter NZ-85 radial engines, for an expected gain of 18 km/h (11 mph; 9.7 kn) in maximum speed and 300 m (980 ft) in service ceiling.

Despite good performance and flying characteristics the Couzinet 30 was not produced in quantity and the sole prototype became the personal transport of René Couzinet.

== Specifications (Couzinet 30) ==
Data from L'Aéronautique December 1930: Les avions nouveaux du 12e Salon de Paris - Le trimoteur Couzinet 30 de 120 HP, Aviafrance: Couzinet 30

General characteristics

- Crew: 1 (pilot - transport); 2 (pilot and navigator - mailplane)
- Capacity: 4 pax with 50 kg (110 lb) luggage with fuel for 12 hours flying; 200 kg (440 lb) mail with fuel for 5 hours flying
- Length: 10.4 m (34 ft 1 in)
- Wingspan: 16 m (52 ft 6 in)
- Wing area: 34.4 m^{2} (370 sq ft)
- Aspect ratio: 9
- Gross weight: 1,600 kg (3,527 lb)
- Fuel capacity: 400 L (110 US gal; 88 imp gal)
- Powerplant: 3 × Salmson 9AD 9-cylinder air-cooled radial piston engines, 30 kW (40 hp) each
- Propellers: 2-bladed fixed-pitch wooden proprellers

Performance

- Maximum speed: 178 km/h (111 mph, 96 kn)
- Cruise speed: 160 km/h (99 mph, 86 kn)
- Range: 2,000 km (1,200 mi, 1,100 nmi)
- Service ceiling: 3,600 m (11,800 ft)
