= Burundi Tribune =

Newspaper in Bujumbura, Burundi

The Burundi Tribune is a newspaper published in Bujumbura, Burundi. The online version is published in French and English. It specializes in delivering news on politics, the economy, education and security.
