= Blaisy-Bas =

- Commune
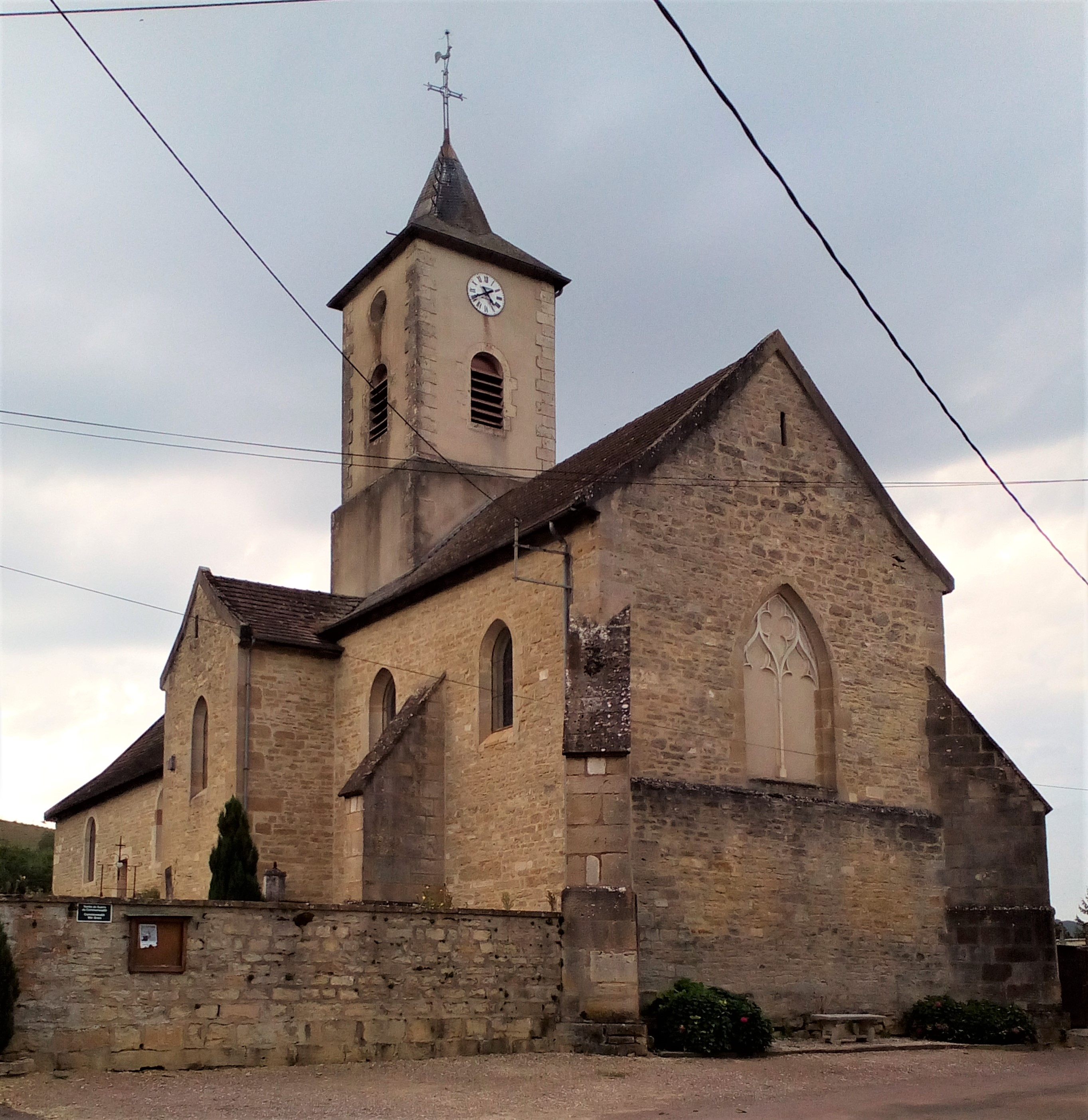
- The church in Blaisy-Bas

- Coat of arms
- Location of Blaisy-Bas
- Location within France Location within Bourgogne-Franche-Comté
- Coordinates: 47°22′24″N 4°44′27″E
- Country: France
- Region: Bourgogne-Franche-Comté
- Department: Côte-d'Or
- Arrondissement: Dijon
- Canton: Talant

Government
  - Mayor (2020–2026): Alain Lamy
- Area^{1}: 13.27 km^{2} (5.12 sq mi)
- Elevation: 418 m (1,371 ft)
- Highest elevation: 585 m (1,919 ft)
- Lowest elevation: 381 m (1,250 ft)
- Population (2023): 677
  - Density: 51.0/km^{2} (132/sq mi)
- Time zone: UTC+01:00 (CET)
  - Summer (DST): UTC+02:00 (CEST)
- INSEE/Postal code: 21080 /21540
- ^{1} French Land Register data, which excludes lakes, ponds, glaciers > 1 km^{2} (0.386 sq mi or 247 acres) and river estuaries.

Blaisy-Bas (French pronunciation: [blɛzi ba]) is a commune in the Côte-d'Or department in eastern France.

== Population ==
Historical population
Year	Pop.	±% p.a.
1968	470	—
1975	601	+3.57%
1982	469	−3.48%
1990	575	+2.58%
1999	587	+0.23%
2007	692	+2.08%
2012	712	+0.57%
2017	669	−1.24%
2023	677	+0.20%
Source: INSEE

== See also ==
- Communes of the Côte-d'Or department
