= Couzinet 40 =

40

General information
- Type: Long-range commercial monoplane
- Manufacturer: Société des Avions René Couzinet
- Primary user: Aéropostale

History
- Manufactured: 1
- First flight: 4 June 1932

The Couzinet 40 was a mailplane built in France in the early 1930s.

== Design ==
The Couzinet 40 was a five-seat low-wing monoplane of all-wood construction.

== Specifications ==
Data from

General characteristics

- Crew: 5
- Length: 16.1 m (52 ft 10 in)
- Wingspan: 28 m (91 ft 10 in)
- Height: 4.36 m (14 ft 4 in)
- Wing area: 92.45 m^{2} (995.1 sq ft)
- Empty weight: 4,140 kg (9,127 lb)
- Gross weight: 6,456 kg (14,233 lb)
- Powerplant: 3 × Gnome & Rhône 7Kd 7-cylinder air-cooled radial piston engines, 260 kW (350 hp) each

Performance

- Maximum speed: 230 km/h (140 mph, 120 kn)
