= Arc-en-Ciel (newspaper) =

Weekly newspaper in Burundi

The Arc-en-Ciel is a private weekly newspaper published in Burundi. The chief editor of the newspaper, Thierry Ndayishimiye, was arrested on defamation charges related to a story about alleged government corruption.
