= Couzinet 70 =

French plane introduced in 1934

70 Arc-en-Ciel
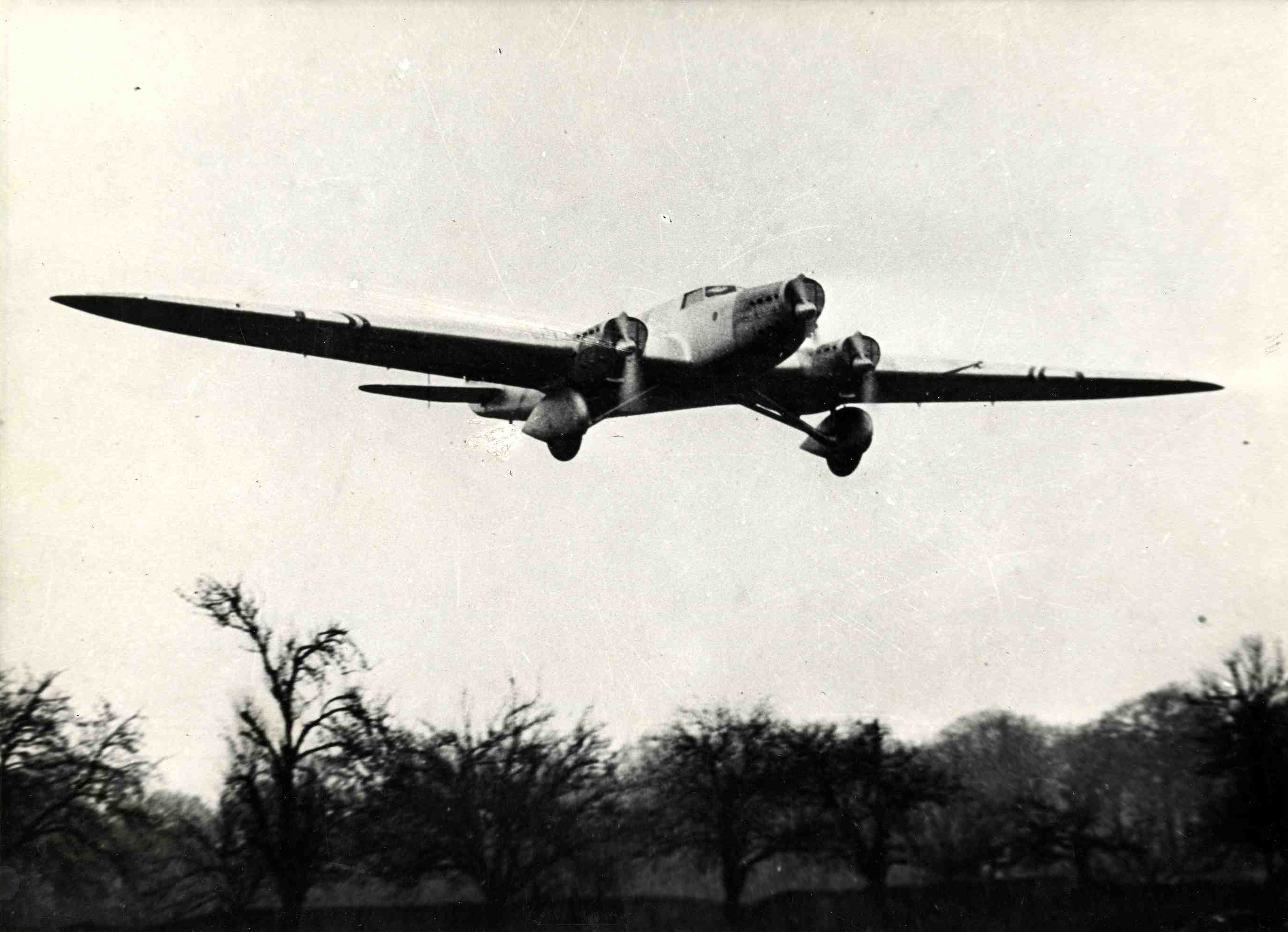

General information
- Type: Long-range commercial monoplane
- Manufacturer: Société des Avions René Couzinet
- Primary user: Aéropostale

History
- Manufactured: 3
- Introduction date: May 1934
- First flight: 11 February 1932

The Couzinet 70 was a French three-engined commercial monoplane designed and built by Société des Avions René Couzinet.

The Couzinet 70 Arc-en-Ciel III ('Rainbow') was developed from the Couzinet 20 by René Couzinet. The Couzinet 70, which was larger than its predecessors, was developed originally as a mail plane for use of Aéropostale's South Atlantic service.

It was a low-wing monoplane that had a fixed tailwheel undercarriage and powered by three Hispano-Suiza 12Nb inline piston engines. The two wing mounted engines could be accessed mid-flight through tunnels in the wing. After route-proving in 1933, the aircraft was modified and re-designated as the Couzinet 71 and entered service with Aéropostale in May 1934.

== Design and developments ==
During the early 1930s, the Société des Avions René Couzinet set about the development of what would become the Couzinet 70. Its design posed numerous challenges and pushed the bounds of aeronautical understanding at that time. It had a relatively high level of fineness, which was a somewhat controversial design choice at that time; the resulting aircraft being relatively difficult and expensive to fabricate. One positive result of the high fineness rate was the aircraft's ability to climb with only two of its three engines operational; it could also maintain horizontal flight with only one running engine.

One principal performance attribute for the aircraft during its development was the ability to routinely conduct transatlantic flights. While such routes required a high proportion of fuel to be carried onboard, the number of fuel tanks fitted could be increased or reduced to match the endurance required by a particular customer. Accordingly, the aircraft's payload capacity could be increased by removing several of the fuel tanks, which were housed inside of the wings. Furthermore, a compressed air system permitted the tanks to be emptied within one minute at the pilot's direction.

The fuselage, which was relatively robust, somewhat resembled the hull of a flying boat. Structurally, it comprised numerous bulkheads, both primary and secondary, that were connected via wooden strips and covered by plywood. Those bulkheads positioned directly above the wing spar supported the fittings which secured the wing and the fuselage together. The rear of the fuselage was tapered, akin to that of a whale, into a vertical edge that supported the rudder. The low-mounted wing, while structurally advantageous in easing the blending of the fuselage and wing together, negatively impacted the amount of fuselage space that could have been used to accommodate passengers.

The aircraft was furnished with a large single-piece wing, possessing a span of 27m (88.58 ft), a maximum chord of 5m (16.4 ft), and a maximum thickness of almost 1m (3.28 ft), which diminished both fore and aft of its axis. It had a trapezoidal shape, streamlined wingtips and narrow ailerons, the latter being hinged to secondary spars running parallel to the wing's trailing edge. It had a wooden framework that comprised a pair of equal-size box spars. The ribs of the main box were interspersed between intermediate trellis ribs. Supported by several wooden strips in addition to the spars, the exterior was covered with plywood, the latter being treated with fireproof dope.

It was powered by a total of three engines, one was installed within the aircraft's nose while the other two were on the wings. The powerplant used was a Hispano-Suiza 12Nb liquid-cooled piston engine, which was capable of producing up to 230 hp. Each engine directly drove a twin-bladed wooden propeller. Both the water and oil were cooled using Lamblin radiators. The planes of the tail unit were entirely composed of wood and had a plywood covering. The two-section elevator was hinged to he horizontal stabilizer. Furthermore, it incorporated a special compensating device that was designed inhouse by Couzinet, which broadly resembled the arrangement fitted on the Blériot 165.

Various measures were incorporated to ease both maintenance and usability. A compact door in the cockpit (directly forward of the mechanic's position) permitted mid-flight access to the central engine while a manhole (underneath the pilot's seat) provided access into the wing and, via a 0.7 m (2.3 ft) corridor, the lateral engines. Directly behind the cockpit, where the pilot and mechanic were seated, was a small crew rest area containing two couches; aft of this room was a sizable cabin where the navigator and radio operator, along with their assorted apparatus, were located. A central walkway ran between the tail and this room, which permitted easy access to various elements, which included all of the steering controls, key piping connections, and the fuel cocks.

The undercarriage comprised a pair of independent wheels, each one mounted in a housing directly underneath one of the side engines. They had a track gauge of 5.4 m (17.7 ft) and were furnished with shock absorbers that consisted of 36 independent loops of rubber cable. A cowling enclosed each wheel that formed a continuation of the engine cowling under which it was situated. The wheels were fitted with tires are non-derimmable Dunlop tyres.

== Variants ==
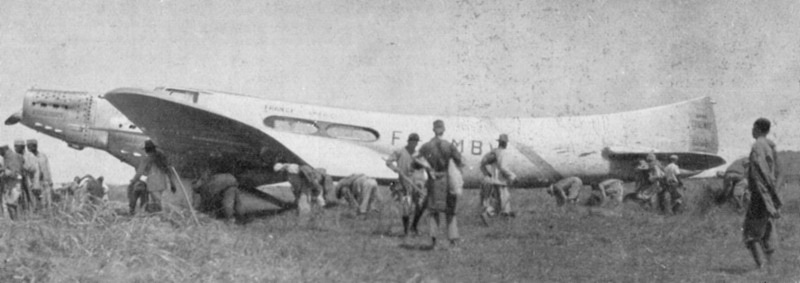
The Couzinet 70 Arc-en-Ciel at Fernando de Noronha, Brazil on 14 June 1934.

10 Arc en Ciel
The original prototype four place long range aircraft, later converted to the Couzinet 11.
11 Arc en Ciel II
Converted from the Couzinet 10. Lost in a crash on 8 August 1928.
70 Arc en Ciel III
Three-engined Hispano-Suiza 12Nb powered prototype, one built and converted to a Couzinet 71.
71
Prototype modified for service as a mailplane, with lengthened nose and strut-braced tailplane.

== Operators ==
France

- Aéropostale

Spain

- Spanish Republican Air Force - Couzinet 101

== Specifications (70/71) ==
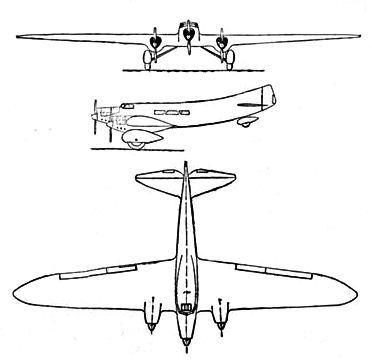
Couzinet 70 3-view drawing from L'Aerophile February 1933

Data from National Advisory Committee for Aeronautics

General characteristics

- Crew: Four
- Length: 16.15 m (52 ft 11.75 in)
- Wingspan: 30 m (98 ft 5 in)
- Height: 4.0 m (13 ft 1.5 in)
- Wing area: 90 m^{2} (968.78 sq ft)
- Empty weight: 7,310 kg (16,116 lb)
- Gross weight: 16,790 kg (37,015 lb)
- Powerplant: 3 × Hispano-Suiza 12Nb V-12 liquid-cooled piston engine , 485 kW (650 hp) each

Performance

- Maximum speed: 280 km/h (174 mph, 151 kn)
- Range: 6,800 km (4,225 mi, 3,671 nmi)
