= René Couzinet =

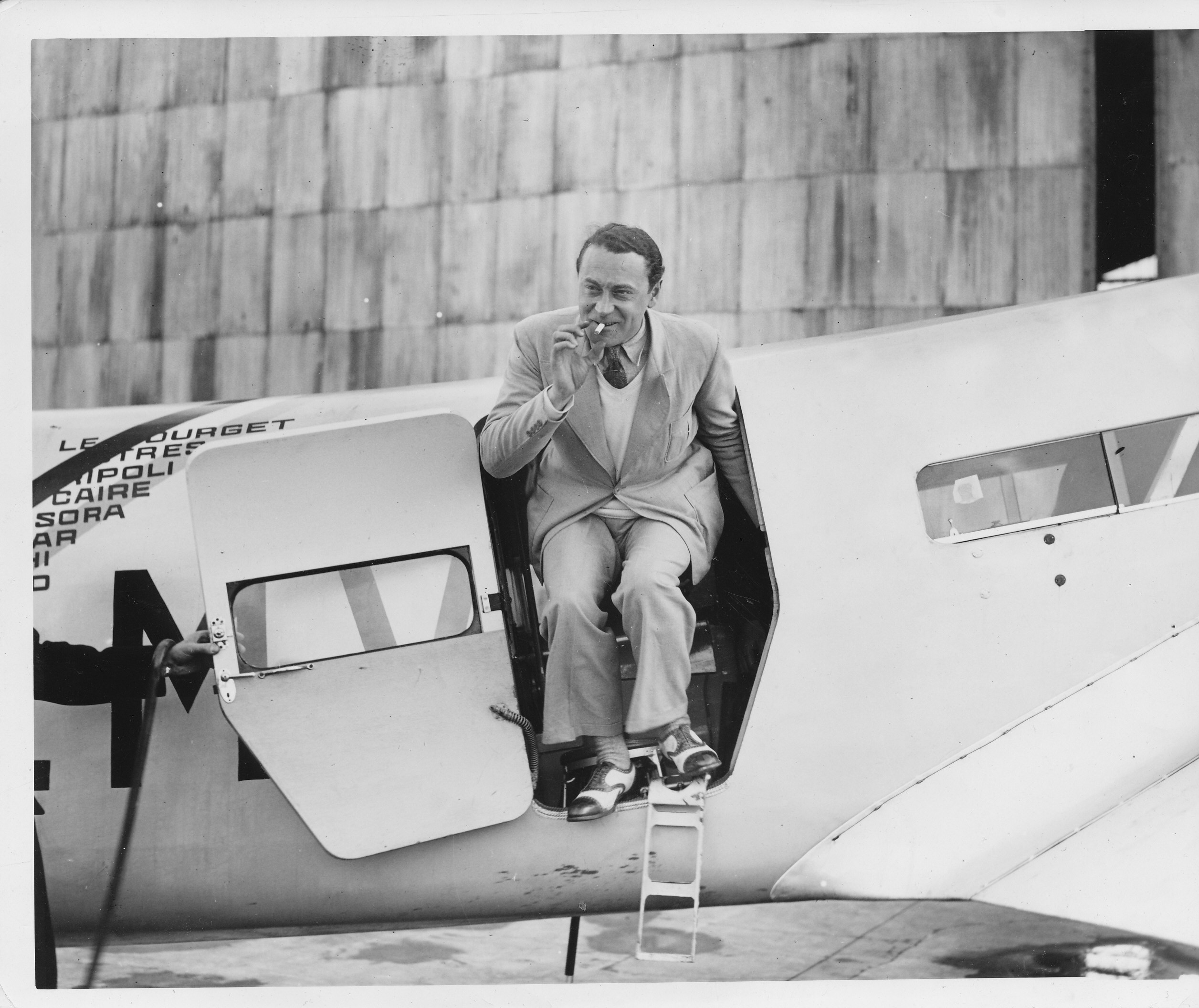
- René Couzinet exits from the Couzinet 33 Biarritz in 1933
- Born: René Couzinet; 20 July 1904; Saint-Martin-des-Noyers, France
- Died: 16 December 1956 (aged 52); Paris, France
- Occupations: Inventor, Aircraft engineer and manufacturer
- Known for: Couzinet Aircraft
- Spouse: Gilberte (1936)

René Couzinet (20 July 1904 – 16 December 1956) was a French aeronautics engineer and aircraft manufacturer, inventor with 91 patented registered inventions. The Société des Avions René Couzinet manufactured a range of Couzinet aircraft during the 1920s and 1930s.

== Biography ==
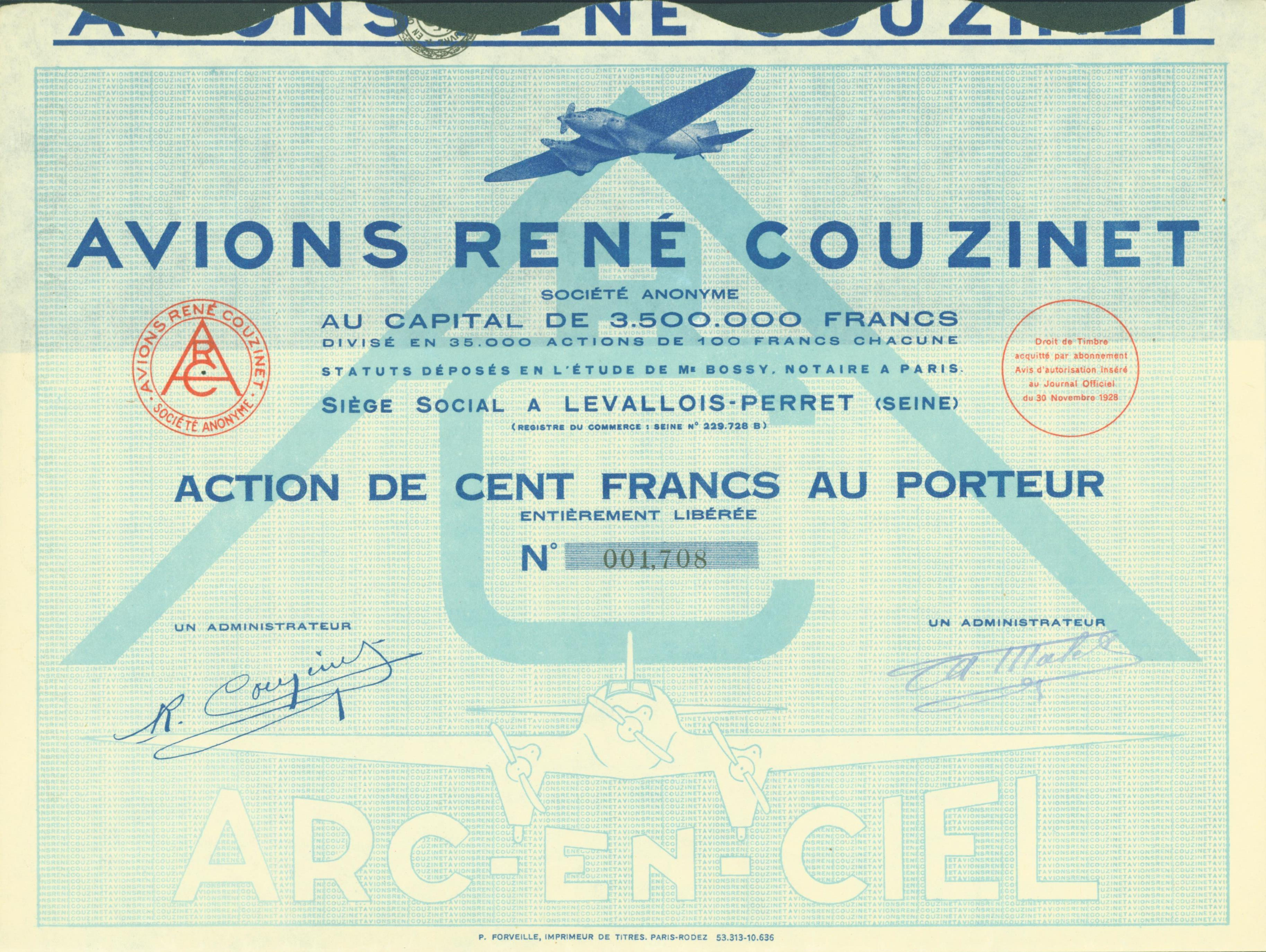
Share of the Avions René Couzinet S. A., issued 30 November 1928

Couzinet's father was a school teacher, and from a very young age he was fascinated by aviation and observing the flight of swallows. In 1921 he enrolled at the École Nationale Supérieure d'Arts et Métiers (ENSAM) (School of Arts and Crafts) at Angers (with Louis Béchereau), where he both graduated and filed several aviation patents. In 1924 he attended the École supérieure de l’aéronautique (Graduate School of Aeronautics). He financed his studies by working in a turbine factory, before joining the French Air Force (Armée de l'air) in November 1925, where he became a lieutenant.

In 1927, he built the Couzinet 10 Arc-en-Ciel (Rainbow) No 1, a modern shape for its time. It was a three-engined monoplane with thick wings and a tapered body and tailplane, which was characteristic of all Arc-en-Ciels to follow. Jacques Lacoste, managing director of engine manufacturer Hispano-Suiza, lent him three engines without charge, and additionally he raised a loan of $50,000 US Dollars. The Arc-en-Ciel's first flight was on 7 May 1928.

The aircraft manufacturer ANF Les Mureaux agreed to take charge of the first prototype, with Couzinet consulting, making observations and studies. The leading French engineer Albert Caquot was also involved with the project.

In 1928, he built the Couzinet 27, a four-seater which crashed during trials on August 8, 1928. The mechanic Lanet was killed immediately, the pilot Drouin died a few days later, and Manuel Gianoli survived.

On 17 February 1930 a fire destroyed the workshops of Émile-Louis Letord at Meudon, losses these included a twin tri-motor engined Couzinet 20 and a Couzinet 27 Arc-en-Ciel II.

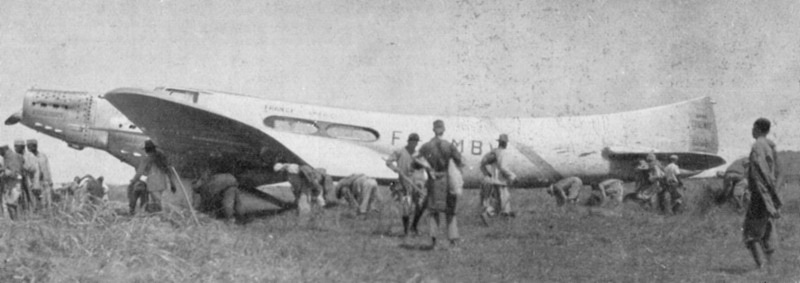
L'"Arc-en-Ciel", 14 June 1934, landed for the first time at Fernando de Noronha, Brazil.

The Couzinet 33 Biarritz, a four-seater passenger plane, made its first flight on 25 November 1931. From March 6 to April 5, 1932, it completed the first air link from France to New Caledonia piloted by Charles de Verneilh Puyraseau, Max Dévé second pilot and radio operator, and Emile Munch mechanic. The crew were unharmed by its rough landing at Tontouta Nouméa but it was dismantled and shipped back to France by sea. The Biarritz, repaired and equipped with more powerful engines, went on to perform in Europe, including a flight carrying Pierre Cot, the French air minister, between Moscow and Paris, as well as to make several flights in Africa, including to the Cape Verde Islands. Returning from North Africa, it crashed at Blaisy-Bas in the Côte-d'Or on 30 October 1933.

The Couzinet 70 Arc-en-Ciel III made its first flight on 11 February 1932. On 16 January 1933, piloted by Jean Mermoz and accompanied by Couzinet himself, he crossed the South Atlantic from Saint-Louis, Senegal, to Natal, Brazil, in less than twelve hours. Their triumphant return to Le Bourget on 21 May 1933 was greeted by 15,000 people, and the aircraft was then operated by Air France until 1937.

All the aircraft retained the same three-engined layout but were never fully accepted by the officials of the French aeronautics industry. In 1933, separated from ANF Les Mureaux, Couzinet was on the verge of bankruptcy so the research agency was integrated with the Breguet Aviation (Société anonyme des ateliers d’aviation Louis Breguet) in Villacoublay.

In 1952 he released photographs of a model for his flying saucer, the Couzinet RC-360. A vertical takeoff aircraft (VTOL) that used two contra-rotating discs powered by three engines. A second model was designed with six Lycoming engines (180 hp each) and one Marcel Dassault Viper turbojet.

== Family ==
In 1936, he married Gilberte (née Chazottes) the widow of aviator Jean Mermoz.

== Death and commemoration ==
During World War II he emigrated to Brazil and was responsible for the technical direction of their national aviation policy. On return to France he found most consultancy opportunities were closed to him, and his many futuristic projects, hydrofoil and vertical take-off flying saucer aircraft, named Aérodyne à ailes multiples, did not progress beyond concepts and models. In despair, on 16 December 1956 he killed both himself and his wife Gilberte. He is buried in the cemetery of Bagneux, Paris.

The Aéroport de La Roche-sur-Yon - Les Ajoncs at La Roche-sur-Yon is named Aérodrome René-Couzinet.

The Collège René Couzinet at Chantonnay is named in his honour.
