= Service Technique de l'Aéronautique =

French state organization

The Service technique de l'aéronautique (STAé) was a French state body responsible for coordinating technical aspects of aviation in France. Formed in 1916 as the Section technique de l'aéronautique, the STAé continued until 1980 when its functions were distributed among other French governmental bodies, including the Service technique des programmes aéronautiques (STPA), Service technique des télécommunications et des équipements aéronautiques (STPA), and the Service central de la production, des prix et de la maintenance (SCPM).

== History ==
L'Établissement central de l'aérostation militaire de Chalais-Meudon (Central Establishment of the air balloon of Chalais-Meudon) was formed in 1877. The first aeronautical laboratory in the world, its mission was to design and assemble all French military aerostatic equipment (i.e. related to airships and balloons), and to train personnel in their use.

By early 1916 French military aircraft were struggling with performance and armament limitations. A lack of technical coordination created conflicts between military requirements and manufacturer capabilities, resulting in development delays and technological stagnation. At the instigation of the Deputy Secretary of State for Aeronautics René Besnard and Minister of War General Gallieni, the Section technique de l'aéronautique was created on February 21, 1916 to coordinate all aspects of new aircraft design. The new organisation, which served as the French equivalent of the British Royal Aircraft Factory, was led by Émile Dorand, former head of Laboratoire d'aéronautique de Chalais-Meudon.

The STAé moved to Issy-les-Moulineaux and established the l'Établissement d'expériences techniques d'Issy-les-Moulineaux (Issy-les-Moulineaux Technical Experiments Establishment), which included laboratories, wind tunnels, and ground testing facilities which had been placed at the disposal of the Ministère de la Guerre (Ministry of War). The new establishment was charged with directing, coordinating, and centralising new military aviation research across three categories: aviation, armament, and research and development. The STAé was also tasked with ensuring that service chiefs' demands were met by French industry where possible, thereby coordinating military requirements with manufacturing capabilities.

The initial tasks of the STAé included developing a tractor propeller observation aircraft to defend against rear attacks by the Fokker E.III; introducing a fighter capable of firing through the propeller disk; and developing twin-engined three-seat observation aircraft. Dorand also led the STAé in developing a "standard atmosphere" to allow for the comparison of different aircraft and equipment performance using a common baseline. Later, the STAé focused on aircraft engines, issuing specifications and promoting lighter, more powerful, and reliable designs, and on April 6, 1918 a ministerial decision made the STAé officially responsible for aircraft, engines, armament, flight testing, and research. As such, the STAé established regulations for designing aircraft to improve safety as well as drawing up specifications for a wide range of military aircraft classes, which were assessed in a competitive fashion and production contracts issued accordingly.

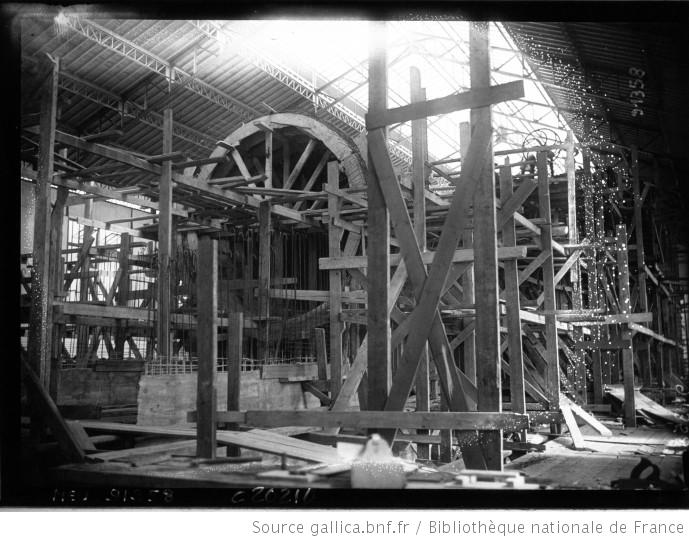
The STAé wind tunnel under construction at Issy-les-Moulineaux in 1921

On 6 June 1919, l'Office de coordination générale de l'aéronautique was created and attached to the Direction de l'aéronautique militaire, bringing together the STAé, Service des fabrications de l'aéronautique (SFA) and Service de la navigation aérienne (SNAé). In 1934, under the ministère du général Victor Denain, the Direction générale de l'aéronautique was replaced by the Direction des constructions aériennes, which incorporated both the STAé and the SPAé. After the surrender of France in May 1940 the STAé evacuated to Roanne in Vichy France.

In 1945 director of the STAé Inspector General Merle created an Etudes Special section (STAé/ES) for research and development of missiles, with other Etudes Special sections emerging over the years for helicopters, equipment, engines, armaments, and more.

== STAé specifications ==
From 1919 until 1940 the STAé standardised equipment and products for civil and military aviation under the specific regulations of the Ministry of Air, issuing specifications, assessing designs from industry competitively before production contracts were issued, and then overseeing their implementation.

== Directors ==
- Émile Dorand (28 February 1916 - 11 January 1918)
- Albert Caquot (12 January 1918 - 1920)
- Georges Fortrant (1920–1925)
- Albert Caquot (1928–1933)
- Roger Guénod (1974–1980)
