= 1933 in aviation =

This is a list of aviation-related events from 1933:

== Events ==
- The United States Coast Guard requests authorization to construct its first cutters with a capability of carrying aircraft.
- Tokyo conducts its first blackout exercise.
- The Berliner-Joyce Aircraft Corporation is absorbed into North American Aviation.
- The Royal Air Force declares the Avro 504 obsolete after 20 years of service.

=== January ===
- The United States Army Air Corps receives the responsibility to conduct long-range reconnaissance flights and operations "to the limit of the radius of action of the airplanes" off the coasts of the United States and its overseas territories. This requirement prompts the Army Air Corps to initiate the acquisition process for a bomber with the ability "to reinforce Hawaii, Panama, and Alaska without the use of intermediate servicing facilities."
- January 1 – A requirement that pilots flying interstate routes in the United States demonstrate their ability to use airway navigation aids and fly specified maneuvers guided entirely by instruments before they can receive a scheduled air transport pilot rating from the United States Department of Commerce's Aeronautics Branch goes into effect.
- January 2 – After modifications, HMS Courageous reenters service with the Royal Navy as the world's first aircraft carrier equipped with hydraulically controlled arresting gear.
- January 2–3 – During the Battle of Shanhai Pass, a squadron of Imperial Japanese Army bombers provides close air support to Japanese Kwantung Army ground forces in action against China's National Revolutionary Army at the Shanhai Pass at the fortified eastern end of the Great Wall of China.
- January 7 – Bert Hinkler dies in the crash of his de Havilland Puss Moth on the north slope of the Pratomagno in Italy's Apennine Mountains on the first leg of his attempt to break the time record for a flight from the United Kingdom to Australia. His body is not found until 27 April.
- January 16 – With aircraft manufacturer René Couzinet on board, Jean Mermoz and crew make a non-stop flight across the South Atlantic Ocean from Saint-Louis, Senegal, to Natal, Brazil, in 17 hours 27 minutes in the Couzinet 70 Arc-en-ciel III.

=== February ===
- February 2 – Spartan Air Lines is formed to make use of the Spartan Cruiser airliner. The airline will begin flight operations on April 12.
- February 6–8 – British Royal Air Force Squadron Leader Oswald Gayford and Flight Lieutenant Gilbert Nicholetts make the first non-stop flight from England to South Africa (Walvis Bay) in a Fairey Long-range Monoplane. The 5,309-mile (8,544 km) flight is a new distance record and takes 57 hours 25 minutes.
- February 6–9 – Jim Mollison flies a de Havilland Puss Moth from England to Brazil, via Senegal, across the South Atlantic Ocean, making him the first person to fly solo across both the North and South Atlantic.
- February 8 – The Boeing 247, often considered the first modern ariliner, makes its first flight.
- February 15 – Eastern Air Transport (the future Eastern Air Lines) acquires Ludington Airline.
- February 25 – USS Ranger (CV-4), the United States Navy's first ship designed from the outset as an aircraft carrier, is launched.

=== March ===
- March 16 – The Boeing 247, often considered the first modern airliner, receives its type certificate from the United States Department of Commerce's Aeronautics Branch (the predecessor of the Federal Aviation Administration).
- March 28 – Imperial Airways Armstrong Whitworth Argosy airliner City of Liverpool catches fire in the air over Belgium and crashes, killing the crew of three and all 12 passengers, the deadliest accident in the history of British civil aviation at the time. The fire may have been started deliberately.
- March 31 – Ford 4-AT-B Trimotor NC7686, carrying members of the Winnipeg Toilers basketball team from Tulsa, Oklahoma, to Winnipeg, Manitoba, Canada, on a charter flight, crashes near Neodesha, Kansas, probably while attempting a forced landing in a field. The crash kills both crew members and five of the 11 passengers.

=== April ===
- Australian National Airways (ANA), the first airline of that name, goes into voluntary liquidation, and its remaining assets are sold off.
- April 1 – The Indian Air Force is formed.
- April 3
  - Two British aircraft, the Westland PV-3 and Westland PV-6 piloted by Squadron Leader the Marquess of Clydesdale and Flight Lieutenant David MacIntyre, make the first flight over Mount Everest, sponsored by Lucy, Lady Houston.
  - The Royal Air Force reinstates the squadron of nine to 12 planes as the basic organizational unit for its aircraft assigned to Royal Navy aircraft carriers, retaining the six-plane flight as the basic organizational unit only for aircraft assigned to operate from battleship and cruiser catapults.
- April 4 – The U.S. Navy dirigible USS Akron (ZRS-4) crashes during a storm off the coast of New Jersey, killing 73 of its 76 crewmen. It is the worst aviation accident in history at the time, and no greater loss of life will occur in a single air crash until 1950.
- April 10 – Francesco Agello sets a new airspeed record of 682 km/h (424 mph) in the Italian Macchi M.C.72 seaplane.
- April 11 – Departing England on April 11 in the Avro Mark VIA Avian Southern Cross, William N. "Bill" Lancaster begins an attempt to set a speed record for a flight to South Africa. He crashes in the Sahara Desert on April 12 and dies on April 20 while awaiting rescue. His mummified body and wrecked aircraft will not be discovered until February 1962.
- April 12
  - Spartan Air Lines begins flight operations, offering service from Heston Aerodrome outside London to Cowes on the Isle of Wight using three Spartan Cruiser airliners.
  - William Besler makes the first successful flight in a fixed-wing aircraft powered by a steam engine. The aircraft, a Travel Air 2000 biplane, is powered by an oil-fired, reversible 90°-angle V-twin angle-compound engine he and his brother George designed. The seven-minute trial flight is certified by the National Aeronautical Association.
- April 17 – At Oakland Municipal Airport in Oakland, California, George and William Besler unveil their aviation steam engine to the public for the first time, with William flying the steam-powered Travel Air 2000 in a public demonstration that consists of three flights totaling a combined 15 minutes in the air, banking over San Francisco Bay before returning to the airport. The engine is virtually silent, allowing William to call down to the crowd while passing over it at an altitude of 200 feet (61 meters). He reaches 100 mph (160 km/h) and demonstrates the engine's braking power by reversing the propeller on landing and coming to a stop in only 100 feet (30 meters). Despite the engine's success and speculation by aviation reporters that steam engines could economically power the airplanes of the future, the Beslers make no further public flights and do not develop the engine further.
- April 19
  - Five Japanese American pilots fly commercial aircraft from Los Angeles Municipal Airport out over the Pacific Ocean off California as a salute to the ships of an Imperial Japanese Navy training squadron as the ships approach Los Angeles Harbor for a port visit.
  - In the Hawaiian Islands, the U.S. Navy conducts the first mass seaplane flight from Oahu to French Frigate Shoals, a 759-mile (660 nmi; 1,221 km) flight. The aircraft return via the Gardner Pinnacles, completing the round trip in 8 hours 10 minutes.
- April 20 – George D. Besler and William J. Besler's prototype steam biplane, based on a Travel Air 2000, makes the first of several demonstration flights at Oakland airport in the San Francisco Bay Area.
- April 29 – The Nazi government in Germany forms the Reichsluftfahrtministerium ("Reich Aviation Ministry").
- April 30 – The first air service internal to Scotland, Renfrew–Campbeltown, begins, operated by Midland & Scottish Air Ferries Ltd. Winifred Drinkwater, "the world's first female commercial pilot", is hired to fly the route.

=== May ===
- Turkish Airlines is formed under the name "State Airlines".
- Erhard Milch, State Secretary of the German Reich Air Ministry, receives a major study of the future of a new German air force written by Dr. Robert Knauss. Knauss projects that the main threat to the reestablishment of Germany as a great power will be a preventive attack by France and Poland before Germany can fully rearm, and he recommends the creation of a force of 400 four-engined bombers which could deter such an attack with an ability to attack enemy population and industrial centers and destroy enemy morale.
- May 7–8 – Stanislaw Skarzynski flies the South Atlantic from Senegal to Brazil in a small single-seater tourist airplane RWD-5bis, in 20 hours 30 minutes, over a distance of 3,582 km (2,226 mi). The RWD-5bis was the smallest plane to have ever flown the Atlantic - empty weight below 450 kg (990 lb), loaded 1100 kg. It is a part of 17,885 km Warsaw - Rio de Janeiro flight from April 27 to June 24.
- May 13 – The founder of the British Aircraft Company, Charles H. Lowe-Wylde, is killed while flying a B.A.C. Planette at Maidstone Airport near West Malling, Kent, England.
- May 22 – In its inaugural Boeing Air Transport flight from San Francisco, California, to New York City, a Boeing 247 airliner crosses the continental United States in the record time of 19 1/2 hours.
- May 24 – French intercontinental aviation pioneer Ludovic Arrachart dies when his Caudron C.362 suffers engine failure during preliminary trails for the 1933 Coupe Deutsch de la Meurthe race.
- May 29 – Flying a Potez 53, George Detré wins the 1933 Coupe Deutsch de la Meurthe race, covering the 2,000 km (1,200 mi) two-stage closed-circuit course in 6 hours 11 minutes 45 seconds at an average speed of 322.81 km/h (200.58 mph).
- May 31 – The first regular civil air service from Northern Ireland to Renfrew Airport in Glasgow, Scotland, begins.

=== June ===
- Flying the Northrop Gamma Texaco Sky Chief, Frank Hawks sets a new west-to-east transcontinental airspeed record for a flight across the United States, flying from Los Angeles, California, to Floyd Bennett Field in Brooklyn, New York, in 13 hours, 26 minutes, 15 seconds at an average speed of 181 mph (291 km/h).
- June 15 – SACO (Servicio Aéreo Colombiano) is founded in Colombia. It will merge with SCADTA in June 1940 to form the Colombian national airline Avianca.
- June 21 – Flying the Avro 618 Ten Faith in Australia, Australian aviator Charles Ulm and his two-man crew take off from RAAF Station Richmond near Richmond, New South Wales, in an attempt to set a record time for a flight from Australia to England. They will make good time as far as Singapore, but will face delays due to engine trouble and boggy conditions at an airfield in Rangoon, and they will not reach England — landing at RAF Heston, west of London — until July 10.
- June 27 – The Colombian airline SACO begins operations.

=== July ===
- Misr Airlines, which later will become Egyptair, begins flight operations, using de Havilland DH.84 Dragon airliners to serve Cairo, Alexandria, and Mersa Matruh.
- July 1 – The United States Lighthouse Service turns over the responsibility for constructing and maintaining airways in the United States to the United States Department of Commerce's Aeronautics Branch (predecessor of the Federal Aviation Administration).
- July 14–22 – Wiley Post, flying a Lockheed Vega, makes the first solo flight around the world. His flight begins and ends at Floyd Bennett Field in Brooklyn, New York, with stops at Berlin, Moscow, Irkutsk and Alaska - a total distance of 25,099 km (15,596 mi). Spending 115 hours 36 1/2 seconds in the air at an average speed of 144 mph (232 km/h), he sets a new round-the-world speed record of 7 days 18 minutes 49 1/2 seconds, beating the 1931 record he and Harold Gatty had set by 21 hours.
- July 15–17 – Lithuanian-American pilots Steponas Darius and Stasys Girėnas fly nonstop 6,411 kilometers (3,984 miles) in the Bellanca CH-300 Pacemaker Lituanica in an attempt to fly nonstop from New York City to Kaunas, Lithuania, but die when Lituanica crashes 650 kilometers (400 miles) short of Kaunas in Kuhdamm, Germany, on July 17 after 37 hours 11 minutes in the air.
- July 22 – British pilots Amy Johnson and Jim Mollison, flying de Havilland DH.84 Dragon I G-ACCV Seafarer, begin the first non-stop flight from Great Britain to the United States, taking off from Pendine Sands in South Wales and crash landing at Bridgeport, Connecticut.

=== August ===
- The French Army's aviation branch, the Aéronautique Militaire, becomes an independent service, the French Air Force (Armée de l'Air).
- The first practical variable-pitch propeller is introduced into airline service on a Curtiss T-32 Condor II biplane airliner.
- August 2 – Piloting a Mauboussin-Peyret Zodiac, Hélène Boucher sets a women's altitude record of 5,900 metres (19,357 feet).
- August 4 – United States Navy Lieutenant Commander Thomas G. W. Settle attempts to set a new human altitude record in A Century of Progress, a 105-foot- (32-meter-) diameter, 600,000-cubic foot (16,990-cubic meter) balloon with a sealed and pressurized gondola. Launched from Soldier Field in Chicago, Illinois, his flight reaches only 5,000 feet (1,500 meters) and lasts only 15 minutes before the balloon sinks back to the ground because of a valve that sticks open.
- August 5–7 – French aviators Maurice Rossi and Paul Codos fly the Blériot 110 Joseph le Brix from Floyd Bennett Field in New York City to Rayak in the French Mandate for Syria and the Lebanon, establishing a new unrefueled distance record of 9,104 kilometers (5,657 miles).
- August 7 – One of the earliest Korean female aviators, Park Kyung-won, dies in a plane crash near Hakone, Japan.
- August 11
  - One of the largest bombers ever made, the Soviet Union's Kalinin K-7, makes its first flight.
  - Boston-Maine Airways, the future Northeast Airlines, becomes a National Airways contract carrier.
- August 15 – The United States Department of Commerce's Aeronautics Branch (the predecessor of the Federal Aviation Administration) announces that it now requires airlines to make detailed reports of all forced landings they experience on interstate scheduled passenger flights in the United States. Previously, the Aeronautics Branch had requested only that airlines report the number of forced landings they experienced.
- August 29 – The Transcontinental & Western Air Ford 5-AT-B Trimotor NC9607 flies into the side of Mesa Mountain near Quay, New Mexico, during a storm, killing all five people on board.
- August 30 – Air France is formed by the merger of five existing airlines.

=== September ===
- September 2 – Italian aviator Francesco de Pinedo dies when his Bellanca monoplane Santa Lucia crashes on takeoff at Floyd Bennett Field in New York City as he begins a flight to Baghdad in an attempt to set a new nonstop solo distance flight record of 6,300 miles (10,100 km).
- September 4 – The American aviator Florence Klingensmith dies in the crash of her Gee Bee Model Y Senior Sportster racer (tail number NR718Y) during the Frank Phillips Trophy Race at Chicago, Illinois, leading race organizers to ban women from future races.
- September 7 – The prototype of the French Dewoitine D.332 airliner, named Emeraude and registered as F-AMMY, sets a world record for an aircraft in its class by logging an average speed of 159.56 km/h (99.15 mph; 86.16 kn) over a 1,000-kilometer (621-mile) course carrying a useful load of 2,000 kilograms (4,409 pounds).
- September 7–8 (overnight) – Six United States Navy Consolidated P2Y flying boats make a non-stop formation flight from Norfolk, Virginia, to the Panama Canal, covering 2,059 miles (3,314 km) in 25 hours 20 minutes.
- September 24 – The Soviet sealed cabin balloon USSR-1, intended to carry Georgi Prokofiev, Konstantin Gudenoff, and Ernest Birnbaum in an attempt to set a new altitude record for human flight, fails to launch on the first attempt at making the record flight.
- September 28 – Gustave Lemoine, using oxygen but had no pressure suit, sets a new world altitude record of 13,661 m (44,820 ft) in a Potez 506, unable to go higher because of icing of his eyes as he sits in his open cockpit. His flight, made from Villacoublay, France, lasts 2 hours 5 minutes.
- September 30 – The Soviet balloonists Georgi Prokofiev, Konstantin Gudenoff, and Ernest Birnbaum fly in the sealed cabin balloon USSR-1 to an altitude of 62,230 feet (18,970 meters) in a flight of 8 hours 19 minutes, setting a new altitude record for human flight. Although the flight exceeds the previous record for human altitude – set by Auguste Piccard and Max Cosyns in August 1932 – by 9,077 feet (2,767 meters), the Fédération Aéronautique Internationale (FAI) does not recognize the record as official because the Soviet Union is not an FAI member.

=== October ===
- Flying a Farman F.239, French aviators Jean Réginensi and André Bailly set three world airspeed records over distances of 100 kilometers (62 miles), 500 kilometers (310 miles), and 1,000 kilometers (620 miles).
- October 4 – The French aviators Jean Assolant and René Lefèvre take from Oran in French Algeria in the Bernard 81 GR L'Oiseau Canari II, hoping to set a new unrefueled nonstop straight-line world distance record by flying to Saigon in French Indochina. Unexpectedly high fuel consumption puts the record out of reach, and they land in Karachi, having flown 6,600 km (4,100 mi) in 27 hours.
- October 4–11 – Sir Charles Kingsford Smith, in a Percival Gull, sets a new solo flight record between England and Australia of 7 days 4 hours 44 minutes.
- October 7 – Air France is formed by the merger of five French airline companies – Air Orient, Air Union, Compagnie Générale Aéropostale, Compagnie Internationale de Navigation Aérienne (CIDNA) and Société Générale des Transports Aériens (SGTA) – beginning operations with 250 planes.
- October 10 – A bomb destroys a United Airlines Boeing 247 in mid-air near Chesterton, Indiana, during a transcontinental flight across the United States. killing all seven people on board. It is the first proven case of sabotage in civil aviation, although no suspect is ever identified.
- October 13–19 – Flying the Avro 618 Ten Faith in Australia, Australian aviator Charles Ulm and his two-man crew set a record for the fastest flight from England to Australia. Departing Feltham Aerodrome near London and stopping at Athens, Baghdad, Karachi, Calcutta, Akyab (now Sittwe), Alor Setar, and Surabaya, they land at Derby, Western Australia, after a journey of 6 days, 17 hours, 56 minutes.
- October 15 – The Rolls-Royce Merlin engine is started for the first time.
- October 18 – The American Ford 4-AT-B Trimotor NC4806, operating over Nicaragua as an executive aircraft, crashes into Lake Managua from an altitude of 2,000 feet (610 meters), killing all three people on board.
- October 30
  - Returning from a tour of Africa, the Couzinet 33 Biarritz crashes at Blaisy-Bas, France.
  - During an air show at Amarillo, Texas, two aircraft belonging to a flying circus troupe collide over the city while flying through streamers dropped by a third aircraft. Four people aboard the two aircraft die.

=== November ===
- November 2 – The Government of Colombia issues a decree making the Ministry of Agriculture and Commerce responsible for the regulation of civil aviation in Colombia.
- November 4 – The Brazilian airline VASP is established.
- November 7 – In the Soviet Union, the first air terminal in what will one day be Belarus opens in Minsk in the Byelorussian Soviet Socialist Republic.
- November 8 – Eugene L. Vidal, the director of the United States Department of Commerce's Aeronautics Branch (the predecessor of the Federal Aviation Administration), announces a United States Government plan to make low-priced aircraft available for widespread private ownership in the United States. A subsequent survey he conducts indicates strong consumer interest in an airplane priced at about $700.
- November 20 – Ascending from Akron Municipal Airport in Akron, Ohio, United States Navy Lieutenant Commander Thomas G. W. Settle and United States Marine Corps Major Chester L. Fordney set a new official world altitude record for human flight in the balloon A Century of Progress, reaching 61,237 feet (18,665 meters) before landing near Bridgeton, New Jersey. The altitude is 993 feet (303 meters) lower than that reached by the Soviet balloon USSR-1 in September, but the Fédération Aéronautique Internationale (FAI) has not recognized the Soviet record because the Soviet Union is not an FAI member country.
- November 21 – The only completed Kalinin K-7, which had made its first flight only a little over three months before on 11 August, crashes near Kharkov in the Soviet Union after one of its tail booms suffers a structural failure, killing 15 of the 20 people on board. Although two more K-7s are planned, neither is built before the project is cancelled in 1935.
- November 24 – The U.S. Department of Commerce's Aeronautics Branch announces an airport development program in cooperation with the Civil Works Administration, partly to expand and improve the airport infrastructure of the United States and partly to provide work immediately to the unemployed during the Great Depression. The Aeronautics Branch urges municipalities wishing to acquire landing fields to apply within the next two weeks.

=== December ===
- December 1 – Indian National Airways commences the first daily service in India, between Calcutta and Dacca.
- December 3–4 – Flying the Avro 618 Ten Faith in Australia, Australian aviator Charles Ulm flies from RAAF Station Richmond near Richmond, New South Wales, Australia, to New Plymouth, New Zealand, with his wife Jo and secretary Ellen Rogers aboard as passengers. Jo Ulm and Ellen Rogers become the first women to cross the Tasman Sea by air.
- December 7 – A new regulation in the United States requires any person under the age of 21 to obtain the consent of parents or guardians before receiving any type of pilot license.
- December 13 – President Franklin D. Roosevelt makes Northwest Airways pilot Mal Freeburg the first recipient of the Air Mail Medal of Honor.
- December 19–23 – The Fédération Aéronautique Internationale-sponsored Second International Aviation Meeting takes place in Egypt. The 32 competitors take part in three competitions – a 900-mile (1,450-km), two-day touring event called the "Circuit of the Oases;" a 230-mile (370-km) speed contest; and an "Oasis Trophy" competition in which the contestants compete for the trophy based on the number of point they scored in the other two events. Competitors are handicapped under an extremely complex scoring system that takes into account fuel consumption, speed of wing folding, comfort, picketing, take off and landing distances, luggage, engine starting, safety appliances, controls and instruments, refueling, ease of maintenance, and a safety criterion that requires them to shut their engines off at an altitude of 2,000 feet (610 meters) and glide to a landing.
- December 20–30 – Flying the Curtiss Thrush Outdoor Girl, Helen Richey and Frances Harrell Marsalis employ aerial refueling to remain airborne continuously for 237 hours 43 minutes. They fall short of their goal of remaining in the air until January 1, 1934, but nonetheless shatter the previous continuous flight record of 196 hours set in August 1932 by Marsalis and Louise Thaden.
- December 28 – In the United States, the Public Works Administration (PWA) announces that it has set aside $500,000 to fund the project to make low-priced aircraft available for widespread private ownership announced on November 8 by Eugene L. Vidal, the director of the United States Department of Commerce's Aeronautics Branch (the predecessor of the Federal Aviation Administration). U.S. aircraft manufacturers denounce the plan — referred to as the "Poor Man's Airplane" — as unrealistic, the PWA funds will never materialize, and the project will collapse, although the U.S. Department of Commerce will continue to promote the development of affordable aircraft.
- December 30 – The Imperial Airways Avro Ten Apollo (G-ABLU) strikes a radio mast and crashes at Ruysselede, Belgium, killing all 10 people on board. King Albert I of Belgium will award Camille van Hove, who is hospitalized with serious burns suffered while trying to rescue victims from the airliner's wreckage, the Civic Cross (1st Class).
- December 31
  - Jean-Pierre Bonnot and Robert Auguste Michel Jeanpierre take off in the Latécoère 300 flying boat Croix-du-Sud ("Southern Cross") from the Étang de Berre in France to begin an overnight flight to Saint-Louis, Senegal. When they land on January 1, 1934, the 3,793.200-kilometre (2,356.985-mile) flight will set a world seaplane record for nonstop "distance in a broken line."
  - The Government of Venezuela purchases the airline Aeropostal Alas de Venezuela after the Government of France stops subsidizing it.

== First flights ==
- Avro 639 Cabin Cadet
- Arado Ar 67
- Farman F.270
- Farman F.380
- Kawasaki Ki-3
- Stinson Reliant

=== January ===
- Douglas XFD-1
- January 30 – Curtiss T-32 Condor II

=== February ===
- Aichi AB-6
- February 1 – Boeing XF6B-1, later redesignated Boeing XBFB-1
- February 6 – Kawanishi E7K (Allied reporting name "Alf")
- February 8 – Boeing 247
- February 10 – Hawker Demon
- February 19 – Vultee V-1

=== March ===
- March 1 – Consolidated P-30 (later PB-2)
- March 28 – Bernard 61 T
- March 29 – Miles M.2 Hawk

=== April ===
- Cierva C.30
- April 10 – Airspeed Courier G-ABXN
- April 21 – USS Macon (ZRS-5)
- April 22 – Farman F.370
- April 26 – Potez 53
- April 29 – Latécoère 550

=== May ===
- Avro 638 Club Cadet
- Farman F.221
- Mitsubishi Ki-2 (Allied reporting name "Louise")
- Northrop Delta
- Stinson Model O
- May 4 – Grumman XJF-1, prototype of the Grumman JF Duck and J2F Duck
- May 9 – Vought XF3U-1
- May 27 – De Havilland Leopard Moth

=== June ===
- Seversky SEV-3
- June 11 – Cessna CR-3
- June 16 – Bernard H.52
- June 21 – Supermarine Walrus
- June 23 – Couzinet 100

=== July ===
- Bloch MB.200
- Curtiss XF12C, first United States Navy fighter with folding wings
- July 1 – Douglas DC-1
- July 11 – Dewoitine D.332

=== August ===
- Avia B.534
- Short Scion
- August 11
  - Blériot 5190
  - Kalinin K-7
- August 14 – Tupolev ANT-14
- August 24 – Blackburn Shark

=== September ===
- September 10 – Mignet HM.14 Pou-du-Ciel
- September 11 – Breguet 521 Bizerte
- September 14 – Boeing XF7B-1

=== October ===
- Polikarpov I-15
- October 6 – Pander S-4 Postjager
- October 11 – Blackburn Perth
- October 18 – Grumman XF2F-1, Grumman's first single-seat, enclosed-cockpit aircraft and prototype of the Grumman F2F

=== November ===
- Focke-Wulf Fw 56
- Between November 11 and 18 – Couzinet 101
- November 14 – Potez 54, prototype of the Potez 540

=== December ===
- Curtiss XF13C-2, prototype of the biplane version of the Curtiss XF13C
- Farman F.1020
- Mitsubishi Ki-7 (Allied reporting name "Pine")
- Yokosuka K5Y (Allied reporting name "Willow")
- December 18 – Northrop XFT
- December 20 – Martin M-130
- December 31 – Polikarpov I-16

== Entered service ==
- Arado Ar 65 with the still-secret German Luftwaffe
- Arado Ar 66 with the still-secret German Luftwaffe
- Avro 621 Tutor with the Royal Air Force
- Avro 638 Club Cadet
- Avion Fairey Fox IIM with the Belgian Air Force
- Berliner-Joyce OJ-2 with United States Navy Scouting Squadrons 5 (VS-5B) and 6 (VS-6B)
- Levasseur PL.15 with French Naval Aviation aboard the seaplane carrier Commandant Teste
- PZL P.7a with the Polish Air Force
- Yokosuka K4Y with the Imperial Japanese Navy
- Early 1933 – Westland Wallace with the Royal Air Force

=== February ===
- Curtiss F11C Goshawk with United States Navy Fighter Squadron 1 (VF-1B) aboard USS Saratoga (CV-3), the last Curtiss fighter to enter service with the U.S. Navy

=== March ===
- March 30 – Boeing 247 with Boeing Air Transport

=== June ===
- June 21 – Grumman FF with the U.S. Navy

=== August ===
- Saro Cloud with the Royal Air Force

=== November ===
- November 14 – Handley Page Heyford, the last Royal Air Force biplane heavy bomber, with No. 99 Squadron

=== December ===
- Stinson Model O with the National Aviation School, forerunner of the Honduran Air Force

== Retirements ==
- Curtiss F7C Seahawk by the United States Marine Corps

=== January ===
- January 3 – Bernard 190 by CIDNA

=== September ===
- Avro 604 Antelope by the Royal Air Force
