= F50 =

F50 may refer to:

== Aircraft ==
- Farman F.50, a French twin-engined tactical night bomber
- Farman F.50 (flying boat), a French maritime reconnaissance aircraft
- Fokker 50, a Dutch turboprop airliner
- KAI T-50 Golden Eagle, named F-50 by many countries it is a South Korean built trainer and light combat fighter

== Automobiles ==
- Ferrari F50, an Italian sports car
- Jinbei F50, a Chinese compact MPV
- Toyota Kijang (F50), a Japanese pickup truck

== Ships and boats ==
- F50 (catamaran), a racing boat
- HMS Kimberley (F50), a K-class destroyer of the Royal Navy
- HMS Venus (F50), a V-class destroyer of the Royal Navy
- INS Tarkash (F50), a Talwar-class frigate of the Indian Navy

== Other uses ==
- Eating disorder
- ESP F-50, a guitar
- Nikon F50, a camera

== See also ==
- F500 (disambiguation)
- F5 (disambiguation)
