= F130 =

F130 may refer to:

- Farman F.130, a 1920s French bomber
- Rolls-Royce F130, a high-bypass turbofan engine
