= F51 =

F51 most often refers to:

- North American F-51 Mustang, an American fighter aircraft

F51 may also refer to:

- Farman F.51, a French maritime reconnaissance flying boat
- HMS Ashanti (F51), a Tribal-class destroyer of the Royal Navy
- HMS Grafton (F51), a Blackwood-class frigate of the Royal Navy
- HMS Laurentic (F51), an armed merchant cruiser of the Royal Navy
- INS Trikand (F51), a Talwar-class frigate of the Indian Navy
- Nonorganic sleep disorder
