= André Billy =

André Billy may refer to:

- André Billy (footballer) (1877–1913), French footballer
- André Billy (writer) (1882–1971), French writer

== See also ==
- André Bailly (1942–2023), Belgian politician
