= Farman F.250 =

F.250

General information
- Type: Small passenger transport
- National origin: France
- Manufacturer: Farman, Boulogne-Billancourt
- Number built: 1

History
- First flight: 1931

The Farman F.250 was a small, four passenger single engine low cantilever wing airliner built in France in 1931. The single example built was bought by an airline but was little used, owing to stability issues.

== Design and development ==
The Farman F.250, nicknamed Gros 230, did look rather like Farman's little two F.230 trainer but was a much larger aircraft, with a span about a third bigger and weighing some 2.5 times more. It was designed to carry four passengers over long distances. Wood was used both in the structure and skin of the whole aircraft, which had low, cantilever wings and a flat sided fuselage containing the passenger cabin, located over the wing and lit by three square windows. The pilot's open cockpit was further aft, on top of the fuselage in a streamlined fairing. The fin had a straight, swept leading edge and a squared-off top, with a deep, almost rectangular rudder moving in a cut-out between the elevators; the latter were mounted, with the tailplane, on top of the fuselage.

Forward of the cabin, the top and bottom of the fuselage curved in to form the nose, so that much of the uncowled 380 hp (285 kW) Gnome-Rhône 9Aa radial, a licence-built Bristol Jupiter, stood away from the skin. A long exhaust pipe ran under the fuselage, exiting behind the cabin. The F.250 had a fixed conventional undercarriage with single mainwheels on faired V-struts, plus a long, vertical tailskid.

== Operational history ==
The F.250 first flew in 1931; in September Farman's chief test pilot Lucien Coupet took it to Villacoublay for official tests, During these it achieved a range of flying speeds between 60 km/h and 245 km/h (37-152 mph). Homologated in January 1932, it became part of STGA's fleet but only flew for 31 hours and did not fly any commercial flights because of a general lack of stability. It passed to Air France in the summer of 1933 when this airline was formed by the merger of several French airlines, including STGA.

== Specifications ==
Data from Les avions Farman p.228

General characteristics

- Crew: 1
- Capacity: 4
- Length: 10.50 m (34 ft 5 in)
- Wingspan: 12.11 m (39 ft 9 in)
- Height: 2.88 m (9 ft 5 in)
- Wing area: 31.74 m^{2} (341.6 sq ft)
- Empty weight: 1,409 kg (3,106 lb)
- Gross weight: 2,350 kg (5,181 lb)
- Powerplant: 1 × Gnome-Rhône 9Aa Jupiter 9-cylinder radial, 280 kW (380 hp)
- Propellers: 2-bladed

Performance

- Maximum speed: 245 km/h (152 mph, 132 kn)
- Range: 600 km (370 mi, 320 nmi)
- Service ceiling: 4,000 m (13,000 ft)

== Bibliography ==
- Liron, Jean (1984). Les avions Farman. Collection Docavia. Vol. 21. Paris: Éditions Larivière. OCLC 37146471.
