= Farman F.211 =

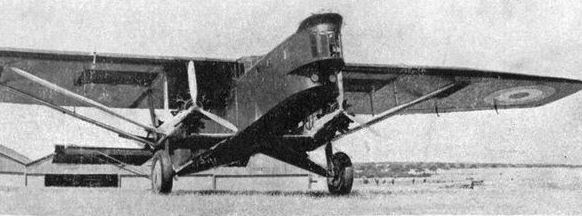

General information
- Type: Four-seat day/night bomber
- National origin: France
- Manufacturer: Farman Aviation Works

History
- First flight: 1932

The Farman F.211 was a French four-seat day or night bomber designed and built by the Farman Aviation Works for the French Air Force.

Designed as a day/night bomber, the F.211 was similar to, but smaller than, the F.220. The F.211 was a high-wing braced monoplane with engines mounted on stub-wings with each stub wing having a pair of Gnome-Rhône Titan 7Kcrs radial engines, one tractor and one pusher. The type did not enter production.

== Development ==
Farman F.211 side view

The F.211 originated within early 1930s at a time when various companies were exploring the development of a new generation of bombers, not only larger and with a greater payload capacity than many of their predecessors but also more capable when conducting nighttime operations and incorporating various advances into their design. Some of the more technically complex and advanced aircraft being proposed were thought to be risky and thus some officials recognised the value in less challenging transitional types that would be used until more capable bombers become available. Qualities prioritised for these transitional types included their easy of construction and speed of adaptation so that they could be introduced relatively quickly; it was also deemed necessary for such bombers to possess some performance improvements, particularly in regards to speed, so that there would be a clear advantage over continuing to use existing aircraft.

On this basis, Farman embarked on the design of such a bomber, making use of reliable construction techniques that were more of an evolution, rather than revolution, from established practices of the era. Furthermore, various aspects of the aircraft, such as its high-mounted monoplane wing, were derived from the commercial-orientated Farman F.300, which had proven itself to possess favourable performance for the time results in regular service. In order to bolster its operational safety margin and high-altitude performance, the design team opted for a four-engine arrangement. Specifically, the F.211 was powered by four Farman-build air-cooled engines, each capable of producing up to 230 hp. The similar F.212, amongst several other revisions, was powered by four Gnome-Rhone K 7 engines instead and was expected to exceed speeds of 200 km/h (124 mi./hr.).

These engines were mounted in pairs, one pair on each side of the fuselage, within all-metal nacelles that were attached to the stub wing at four separate points. The engines were equipped with Saintin-supplied starters that used compressed air. The increased power of the Gnome-Rhone K 7 resulted in material improvements to the aircraft’s performances, particularly when flown at high altitudes. On the F.212, the fuel tanks had a greater capacity, wcih was necessary in order to maintain the same range as the F.211. There were two protected drop tanks installed within the outer wing sections, one on either side; each of these tanks had a capacity of 750 liters (198 gallons).

The wing was built up from three sections: a central portion that was directly secured to the fuselage and a pair of trapezoidal outer wings. The F.211 was furnished with a slightly smaller wing than the F.212 in terms of its span and wing area. The structure of the wing consisted of a pair of box spars complete with spruce flanges and birch-plywood webs that had internal partitions between each of the wooden-truss type rib and were braced by strips. The distance between the two spars was maintained by a series of box ribs. On the F.212, some of the wooden ribs were replaced by light-metal counterparts. Both the upper and lower wing surfaces were braced and thus possessed inherent torsional strength. The wing was covered by fabric. The engine bearers were mounted at the tips of a compact stub wing that was connected to the central portion via a series of vertical and oblique struts along with the outer wings. The box struts were composed of light alloy, as were their front and rear fairings. To reduce the threat posed by fire, the engine-carrying stub wing was entirely made of metal, including the covering. Unlike the F.211, the F.212 lacked struts within the bay formed by the stub wing, fuselage, and the central portion of the main wing, instead being cross-braced by high-resistance steel bands.

The fuselage shared similar construction to that of the Farman F.63 and its derivatives, differing by its greater internal dimensions. It had a wooden structure and a fabric covering, being internally divided, from front to rear, into areas, such as the enclosed pilot's cockpit and the separate gunner-navigator's cockpit, the latter featuring a twin-gun mount. The pilot’s cockpit, which was provisioned with dual flight controls, had the chief pilot seated on the left and the assistant pilot on the right, the latter having a foldable seat that otherwise blocked the passage between the front and rear compartments. Communication between the pilot's cockpit and the forward gunner's station was achieved via an opening in the bulkhead that separated these two compartments. Aft of the pilot’s cabin was the radio compartment; this space had an externally-facing sliding door that permitted the crew to bail out using provisioned parachutes. Directly behind this compartment was the bomb bay, which had a large bomb rack installed on the lefthand side of the aircraft along with a smaller one on the righthand side that could be replaced by an additional drop tank to increase the aircraft’s range. The rear of the fuselage had a large compartment that had no specific purpose. Ground access was via a door on the righthand side of the fuselage. A downward-firing machine gun was mounted on the floor of this compartment, while its after end was occupied by the rear gunner's station. The general internal arrangement was similar to that of the Farman F.63.

The tail unit had conventional fabric-covered tail surfaces. The top of the stabilizer was braced by wires while the base used struts. A balanced rudder was fitted. The elevator, rudder and ailerons were all actuated via flexible cables and piano wire. The elevator was operated by a segment mounted on the twin aileron control wheels in the cockpit while the rudder was operated via bars. The landing gear had a pair of independent faired wheels, each with a semi-axle that hinged to the bottom longeron of the fuselage and carried the wheel hub at its other end. A rear strut was present to absorb any recoil stresses. Both the semi-axle and recoil strut were enclosed by a fairing. A Messier-supplied vertical oleo-pneumatic strut was hinged under the forward vertical wing strut. The wheels were equipped with brakes. While the F.211 was outfitted with a tailskid, the F.212 had a swivelling tail wheel instead.

== Variants ==
F.211
Four-seat day or night bomber with four 300hp (224kW) Gnome-Rhône Titan 7Kcrs radial engines.
F.212
Improved design with more powerful 350hp (261kW) Gnome-Rhône 7Kds radial engines, an increased bomb load of 1400kg (3086lb) and other detail changes.
F.215
Proposed airliner version with two crew and 12 passengers, not built.

== Specifications (F.211) ==
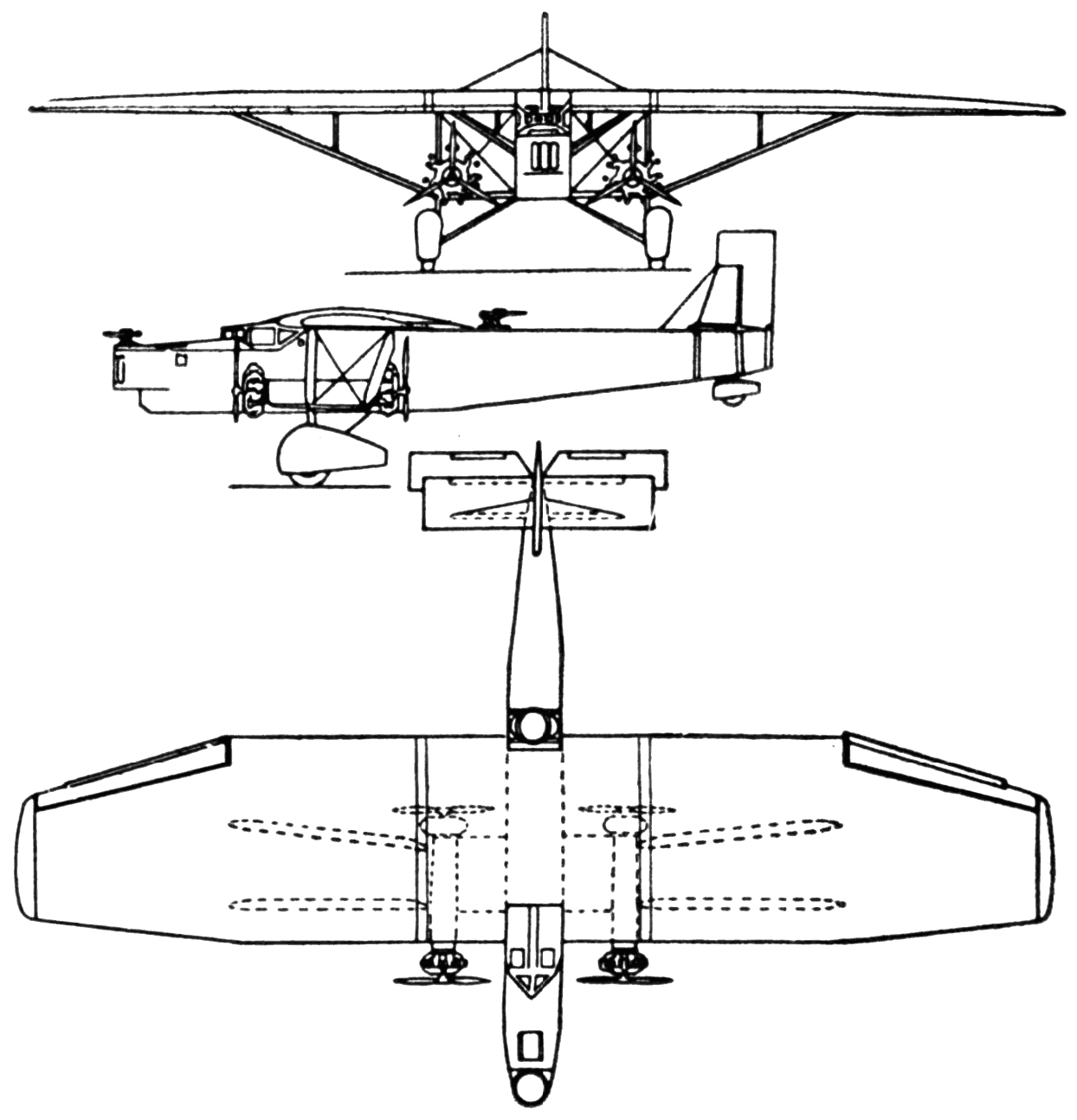
Farman F.211 3-view drawing from L'Aerophile April 1934

Data from The Illustrated Encyclopedia of Aircraft, National Advisory Committee for Aeronautics

General characteristics

- Crew: 4
- Length: 15.90 m (52 ft 2 in)
- Wingspan: 23.00 m (75 ft 6 in)
- Height: 4.22 m (13 ft 10 in)
- Wing area: 109 m^{2} (1,170 sq ft)
- Empty weight: 5,050 kg (11,133 lb) equipped
- Max takeoff weight: 7,400 kg (16,314 lb)
- Powerplant: 4 × Gnome-Rhône Titan 7Kcrs seven-cylinder radial piston engine, 220 kW (300 hp) each

Performance

- Maximum speed: 220 km/h (140 mph, 120 kn)
- Range: 1,000 km (620 mi, 540 nmi)
- Service ceiling: 5,000 m (16,000 ft)

Armament

- Guns: 2 × twin 7.7mm (0.303in) machine-gun in nose and dorsal position and one single 7.7mm (0.303in) machine-gun in ventral position.
- Bombs: up to 1050kg (2315lb)
