= Farman F.460 Alizé =

1930s French monoplane

F.460 Alizé

General information
- Type: Two-seat training monoplane
- National origin: France
- Manufacturer: Farman
- Number built: 10

The Farman F.460 Alizé (English: Tradewind) was a 1930s French civil training and touring monoplane designed and built by Farman to meet a French air ministry requirement.

== Design and development ==
In the early 1930s the French air ministry issued a specification for a two-seat training and sport aircraft for the government-sponsored Popular Aviation Movement. It was a high-wing parasol monoplane with a wide-track landing gear for rough-field operation. The Alizé appeared after aircraft from other companies and no French order was placed. Ten aircraft were built for the Spanish Republican government for training schools in the Murcia area.

== Specifications ==
Data from The Illustrated Encyclopedia of Aircraft

- Crew: 2
- Powerplant: 1 × Lorraine 5P 5-cyl. air-cooled radial engine , 110 hp (82 kW)

== Bibliography ==
- The Illustrated Encyclopedia of Aircraft (Part Work 1982-1985). Orbis Publishing.
- Liron, Jean (1984). Les avions Farman. Collection Docavia. Vol. 21. Paris: Éditions Larivière. OCLC 37146471.
