= Farman Aviation Works =

French manufacturer of aircraft and cars

Farman
- Industry: Aeronautics, defence
- Founded: 1908
- Founder: Dick Farman, Henri Farman and Maurice Farman
- Defunct: 1936
- Fate: Merged
- Successor: Société Nationale de Constructions Aéronautiques du Centre (SNCAC)
- Headquarters: Châteaufort, Yvelines, France
- Products: Aircraft

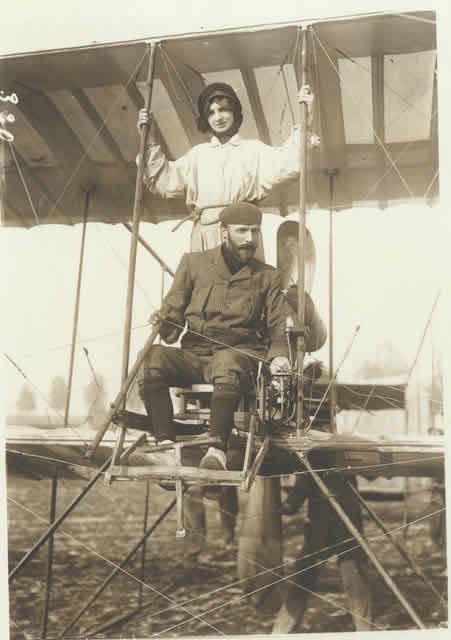
Henri Farman on September 21, 1913 in France

Farman Aviation Works (French: Avions Farman) was a French aircraft company founded and run by the brothers Richard, Henri, and Maurice Farman. They designed and constructed aircraft and engines from 1908 until 1936; during the French nationalization and rationalization of its aeronautical industry, Farman's assets were assigned to the Société Nationale de Constructions Aéronautiques du Centre (SNCAC).

In 1941 the Farman brothers reestablished the firm as the "Société Anonyme des Usines Farman" (SAUF), but only three years later it was absorbed by Sud-Ouest. Maurice's son, Marcel Farman, reestablished the SAUF in 1952, but his effort proved unsuccessful and the firm was dissolved in 1956.

The Farman brothers designed and built more than 200 types of aircraft between 1908 and 1941. They also built cars until 1931 and boats until 1930.

== Background ==
In 1907, Henri Farman bought his first aircraft from Gabriel Voisin and soon began to improve the design of the aircraft; as a result it was known as either Farman I or Voisin-Farman I. In 1908, after further modifications which included re-covering it with Continental rubberized fabric and the addition of side-curtains, the aircraft was re-designated Farman I-bis. Ailerons were fitted after Wilbur Wright's flying demonstration at Le Mans in August 1908.

A second aircraft, to be called Farman II, was built by the Voisin brothers incorporating design refinements to Farman's specification. Voisin sold this aircraft to J.T.C. Moore-Brabazon, who exported it to England, where it was renamed the Bird of Passage. This episode angered Farman, who in early 1909 ended his association with Voisin and started building his own aircraft.

Aircraft designed and built by Henri Farman had a HF prefix, while examples designed and built by his brother Maurice carried a MF prefix.

== List of aeroplanes ==
Farman biplane, ca. 1909

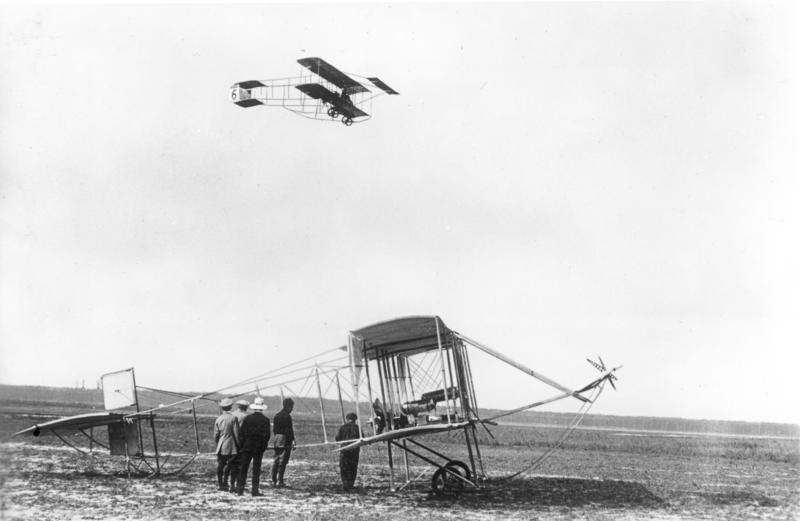
Farman III in flight, Berlin 1910

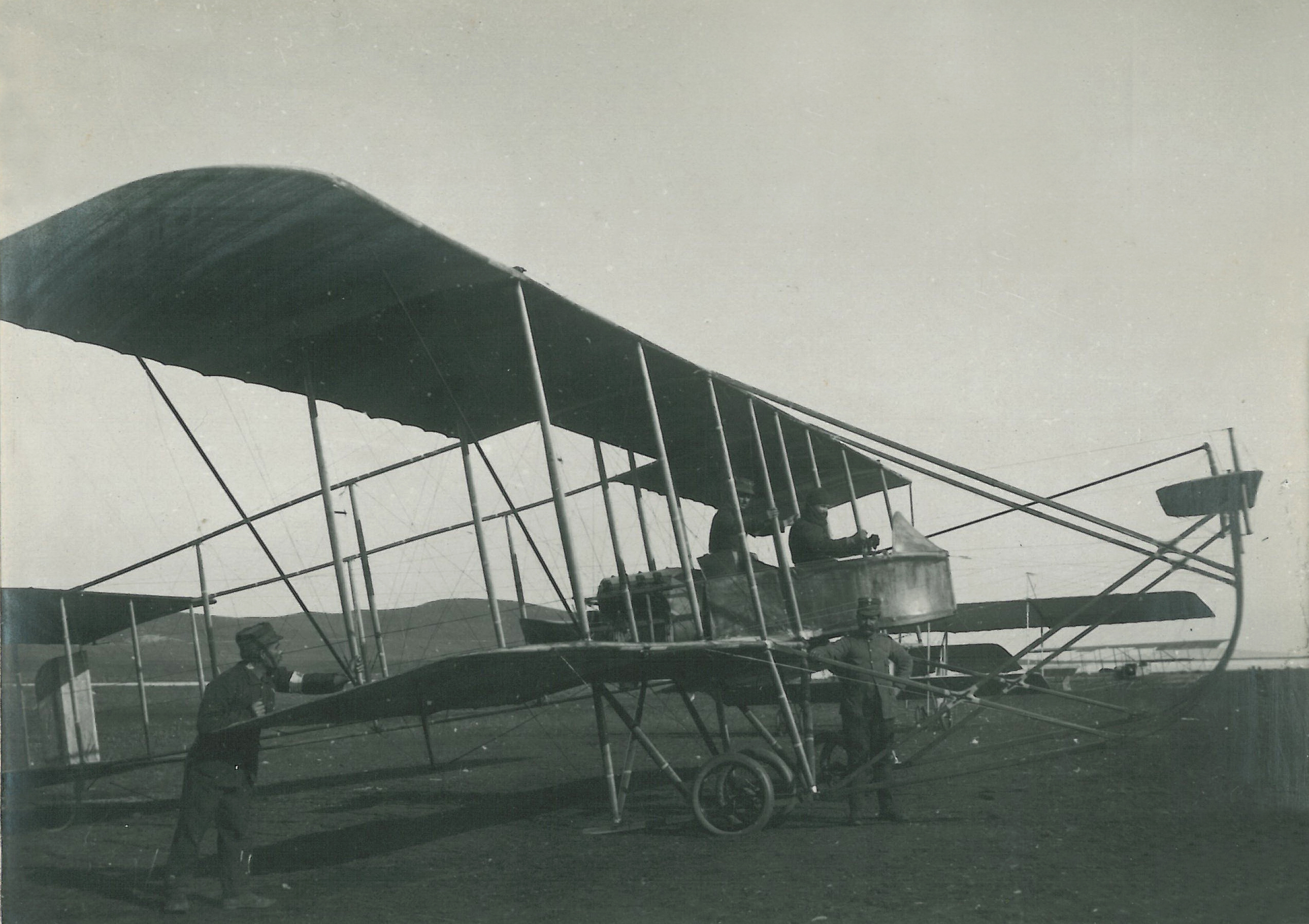
MF.7 Longhorn, Preveza 1912

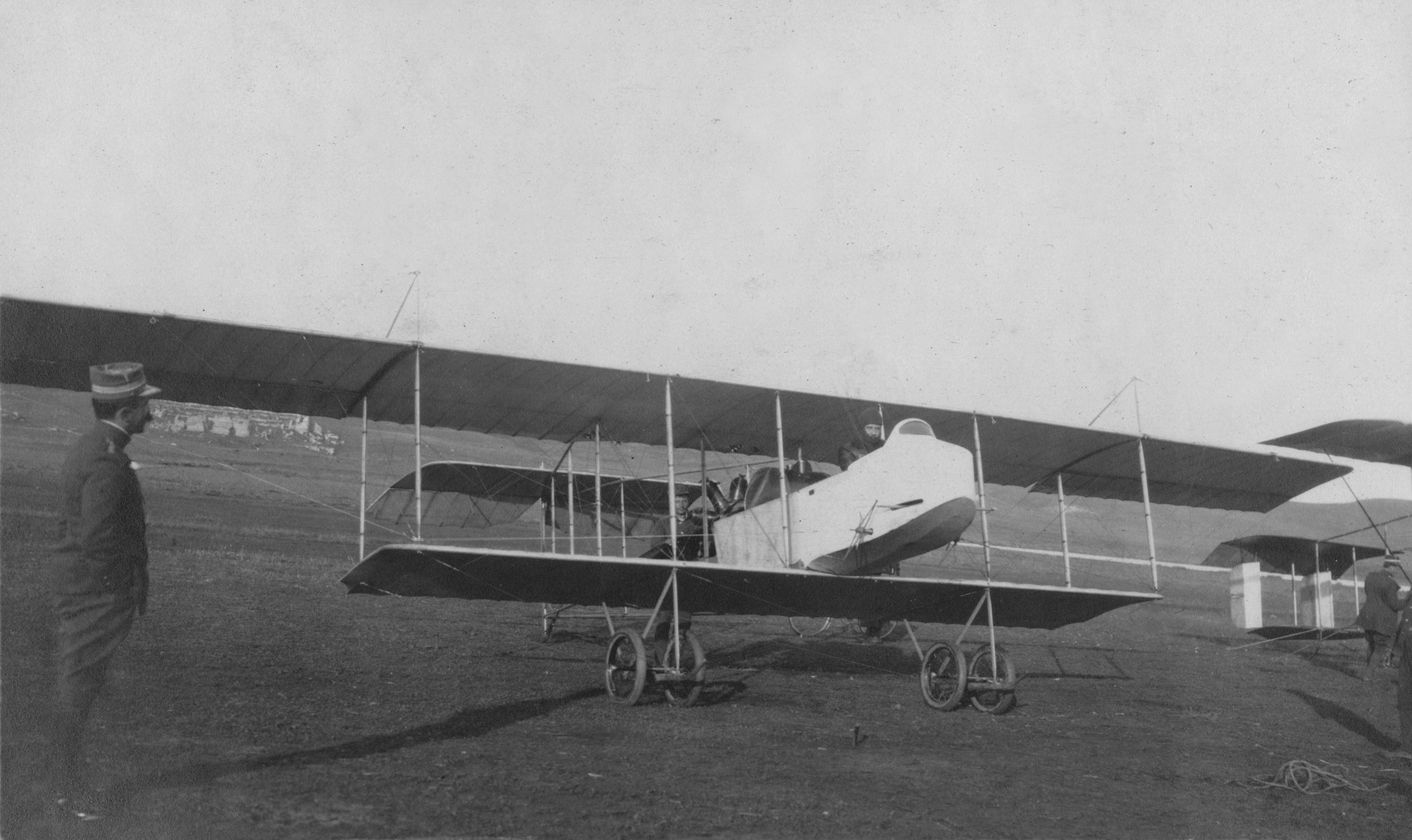
HF.20 biplane, Nicopolis 1912

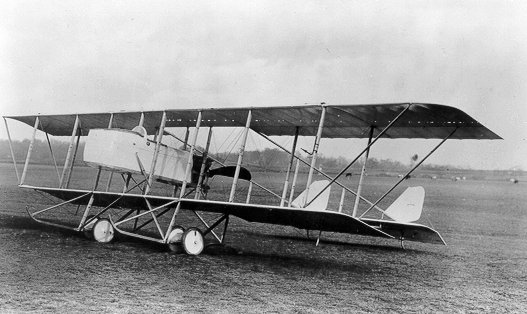
MF.11 Shorthorn 1915

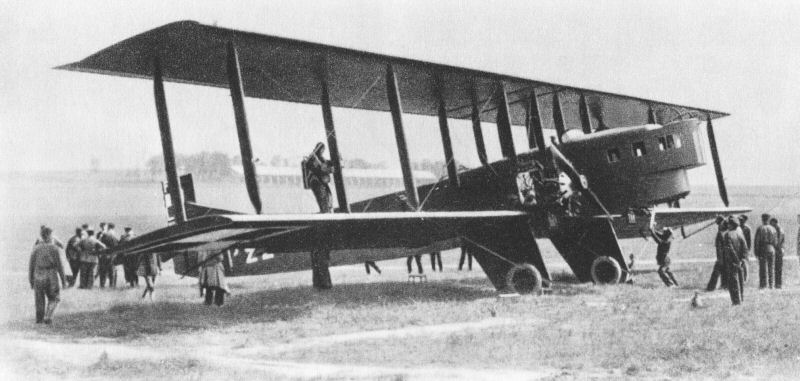
Farman F.60 Goliath 1919

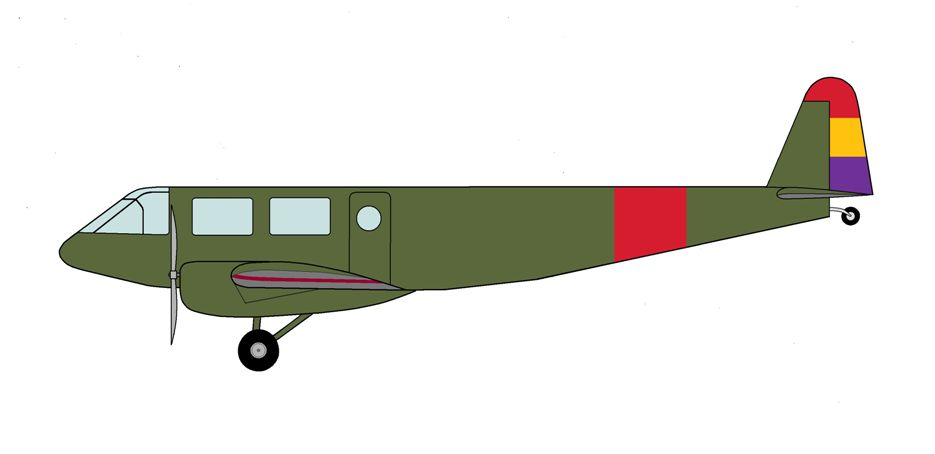
Farman F.430 1934

- Farman III (1909)
- Farman MF.7 Longhorn (1913)
- Farman MF.11 Shorthorn (1913)
- Farman HF.14 - two-seat floatplane (1912)
- Farman HF.20 - reconnaissance biplane (1913)
- Farman HF.30 - two-seat military biplane (1915)
- Farman F.40 (1915) - single-engined reconnaissance aircraft
- Farman F.30 - fighter biplane (1916)
- Farman F.31 - fighter prototype (1918)
- Farman F.50 - biplane bomber (1918)
- Farman F.60 Goliath bomber/airliner, development of the F.40 (1919)
  - Farman F.60 Torp - torpedo carrying floatplane version (1920s)
- Farman Moustique - sports, touring aircraft (1919)
- Farman Sport - sports, touring biplane (1919)
- Farman B.2 - light day bomber biplane (1920s)
- Farman BN.4 - long-range night bomber biplane (1922)
- Farman F.80 - basic training biplane (1921)
- Farman F.90 - passenger transport aircraft (1921)
- Farman F.110 - artillery observation biplane (1921)
- Farman F.51 - maritime reconnaissance flying boat (1922)
- Farman F.120 - 4-engined bomber/airliner (1923)
- Farman F.140 Super Goliath - heavy night bomber (1924)
- Farman A.2 - observation monoplane (1924)
- Farman F.130 - long-range night bomber (1925)
- Farman F.170 Jabiru - single-engined airliner (1925)
- Farman F.150 - day bomber biplane (1926)
- Farman F.160 - torpedo bomber floatplane (1928)
- Farman F.180 - airliner biplane (1928)
- Farman F.190 - civil utility aircraft (1928)
- Farman F.200 - civil utility aircraft (1929)
- Farman F.230 - touring aircraft (1930)
- Farman F.250 - passenger transport aircraft (1931)
- Farman F.280 - mail plane (1931)
- Farman F.211 - day/night bomber aircraft (1932)
- Farman F.220 - 4-engined high-wing heavy bomber (1932)
- Farman F.1000, F.1001 & F.1002 single-engined, pressurised, high altitude research aircraft (1932-5)
- Farman F.1010 - experimental cannon carrier aircraft (1933)
- Farman F.1020 - experimental aircraft (1933)
- Farman F.270 - bomber/torpedo bomber floatplane version (1934)
- Farman F.300 - airliner (1930)
- Farman F.370 - single-seat racing aircraft (1933)
- Farman F.380 - single-seat racing aircraft (1933)
- Farman F.400 - four-seat cabin monoplane (1934)
- Farman F.420 - multi-role aircraft (1934)
- Farman F.430 - light transport aircraft (1934)
- Farman F.460 Alizé - training, touring aircraft (1930s)
- Farman F.480 Alizé - training, touring aircraft (1936)
- Farman NC.470 and NC.471 - six-seat trainer and coastal reconnaissance floatplane (1938)
- Farman F.500 - two-seat trainer aircraft (1952)

== Cars ==
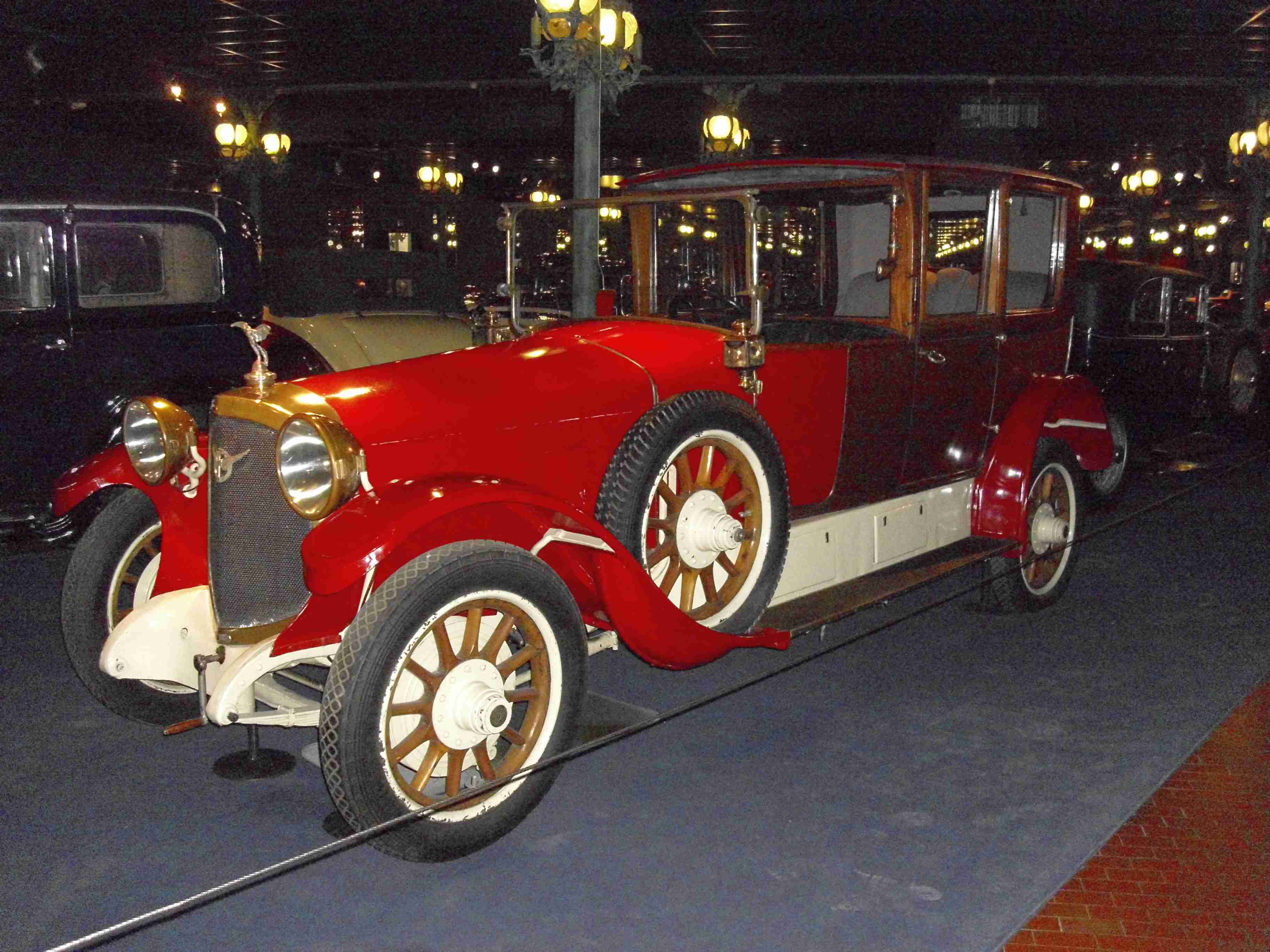
1923 Farman A 6.

The Farman firm designed and built a number of motor car models, including:

- Farman 12 CV (1902)
- Farman A 6 (1919–1923)
- Farman A 6 B (1923–1927)
- Farman NF (1927–1929)
- Farman NF 2 (1929–1931)

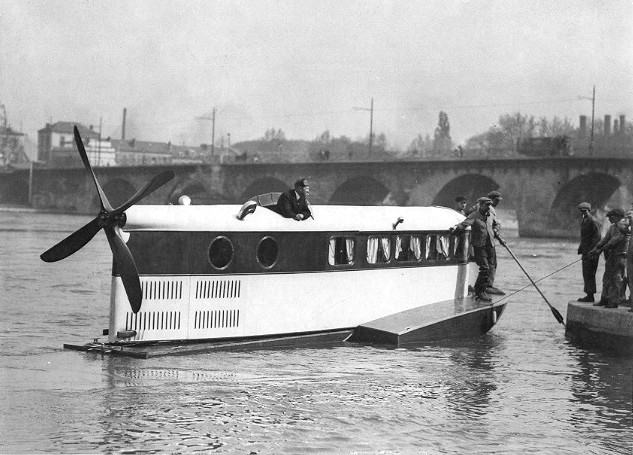
Farman airboat prototype Le Ricocheur in 1924. She was capable of speeds of up to 125 km/h (67.5 knots)

== Boats ==
During the 1920s, Farman Aviation briefly dabbled in building airboats (known generally by the French term "hydroglisseurs"). Farman's boat-building followed directly from its aircraft experience. During the First World War, Farman-built aircraft engines and propellers from Farman MF.7s were used to build airboats that were successfully used during the Mesopotamian Campaign fought by Britain and her colonial subjects against the forces of the Ottoman Empire in Mesopotamia (modern day Iraq). Following the success of these improvised airboats, Britain began ordering purpose-built airboats from Farman and Charles de Lambert's company for use on the Tigris and Euphrates rivers.

Farman Aircraft began producing civilian airboats in the 1920s. Its first non-military airboat sailed in 1920, though its first civilian airboat for sale was Le Ricocheur (pictured at right), a closed-cabin prototype capable of carrying 12 passengers at speeds of up to 125 kilometres per hour (67 kn). Farman marketed airboats for use as water taxis and as light cargo vessels or patrol boats for French colonial governments, particularly on the Mekong and Niger rivers. These later airboats were open-cabin, like the airboats of today, though they tended to be somewhat larger, had higher freeboards, and lacked a protective cage surrounding the propeller. Farman's airboats sold for 25,000 to 50,000 francs depending on the model, a price that proved too steep for potential buyers; the company pulled out of the boat business by the end of the 1920s.

== See also ==
- Société Générale des Transports Aériens — airline initially formed as Lignes Aériennes Farman ("Farman airlines")
