= Farman F.270 =

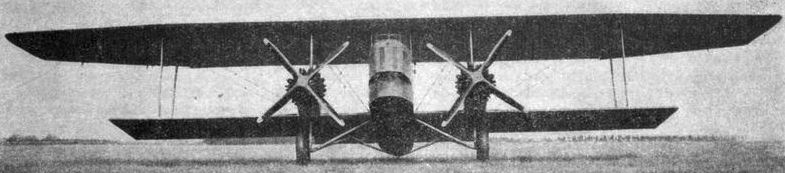

General information
- Type: Prototype bomber/torpedo-bomber
- National origin: France
- Manufacturer: Farman Aviation Works

History
- First flight: 1933

The Farman F.270 was a prototype French bomber/torpedo-bomber designed and built by the Farman Aviation Works for the French Air Force.

== Development ==
The F.270 of 1933 was a development of the earlier F.60 and F.150 series it was a mixed wood and metal sesquiplane with a single vertical tail unit. Powered by two Gnome-Rhône 14Kbr radial engines mounted above the lower wing. It had a wide-track tailskid landing gear and three machine-gun positions, one in the balcony type nose, one amidships and one in a ventral position that fired though a trap door in the floor.

In 1934 an improved variant was produced, the Farman F.271, with engine power boosted to 800 hp (597 kW) additional nose glazing for the bomb/torpedo aimer, and larger navigators station, and the ventral trap door replaced with a retractable bathtub gondola. Neither type entered production but the F.271 was later tested on floats.

== Variants ==
F.270
Prototype with Gnome-Rhône 14Kbr radial engines.
F.271
Improved design with 800hp (597kW) Gnome-Rhône 14K radial engines, also tested as a float-plane.

== Specifications (F.271) ==
Data from

General characteristics

- Length: 18.50 m (60 ft 8 in)
- Wingspan: 26.00 m (85 ft 4 in)
- Height: 6.00 m (19 ft 8 in)
- Wing area: 152 m^{2} (1,640 sq ft)
- Empty weight: 5,830 kg (12,853 lb)
- Max takeoff weight: 11,160 kg (24,604 lb)
- Powerplant: 2 × Gnome-Rhône 14K 14-cylinder radial piston engine, 600 kW (800 hp) each
- Propellers: 4-bladed

Performance

- Maximum speed: 250 km/h (160 mph, 130 kn)
- Service ceiling: 7,500 m (24,600 ft)

Armament

- Guns: 6 × 7.7mm (0.303in) machine-gun (two each in nose, dorsal and ventral positions)
- Bombs: up to 1000kg (2205lb) or one torpedo

== See also ==
Related lists

- List of flying boats and floatplanes

== Bibliography ==
- The Illustrated Encyclopedia of Aircraft (Part Work 1982–1985). Orbis Publishing.
- Liron, Jean (1984). Les avions Farman. Collection Docavia. Vol. 21. Paris: Éditions Larivière. OCLC 37146471.
