= Farman F.1020 =

French experimental aircraft

F.1020

General information
- Type: Experimental aircraft
- National origin: France
- Manufacturer: Farman, Boulogne-Billancourt
- Number built: 1

History
- First flight: December 1933

The Farman F.1020 was an experimental aircraft built in France in 1933 to investigate the behaviour of a semi-circular wing fitted with unconventional controls. It had a short career and only one was constructed.

== Design ==
The Farman F.1020 was built to test a novel wing design, the study of which had begun in 1926. Its plan was essentially semicircular, with the straight edge leading. The chord was thus broad and the aspect ratio very low. Such a wing has high induced drag but was thought to offer good transverse stability and low speed behaviour. It has such features in common with some tailless and delta designs.

The wing of the F.1020 had a near circular trailing edge which squared off into straight tips. The leading edge was a little further forward than the diameter of the idealised semicircle would have been and was slightly swept; it was also extended beyond the rest of the wing, carrying conventional ailerons. The maximum chord, at the wing root, was 5 m, compared with a span of 7.2 m; the aspect ratio was 2.1. The trailing edge carried deep chord control surfaces, two per side: the outer pair were used differentially like ailerons and the inner ones as flaps.

This wing was mounted on the fuselage of a Farman F.402, retaining the empennage, undercarriage and the 110 hp (82 kW) Lorraine 5-cylinder radial engine. As on the F.402, the wing was placed on top of the cabin with two square windows in the roof for upward visibility. The control system enabled the pilot to switch between conventional (aileron, elevator, rudder) control and that provided by the trailing edge surfaces.

== Operational history ==
The first flight of the F.1020, nicknamed the Pelle-bêche (en:Digging-shovel or Spade) and registered as F-AMOG, was in December 1933, piloted by Lucien Coupet. Thereafter it was only flown by Henry Farman who found it almost impossible to spin, but without any other particular merits. A design study was made for a variant with a shorter, 4 m, chord, designated F.1021, but this was not built.

== Specifications ==
Data from Les avions Farman

General characteristics

- Crew: 2
- Length: 8.27 m (27 ft 2 in)
- Wingspan: 7.50 m (24 ft 7 in)
- Height: 2.22 m (7 ft 3 in)
- Wing area: 27 m^{2} (290 sq ft)
- Aspect ratio: 2.1
- Powerplant: 1 × Lorraine 5 Pb 5-cylinder radial, 82 kW (110 hp)

Performance

- Maximum speed: 200 km/h (120 mph, 110 kn)

== Bibliography ==
- Liron, Jean (1984). Les avions Farman. Collection Docavia. Vol. 21. Paris: Éditions Larivière. OCLC 37146471.
