= Farman F.380 =

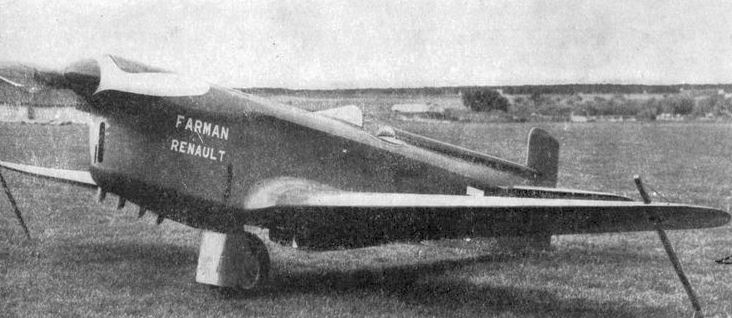

General information
- Type: Single-seat racing monoplane
- National origin: France
- Manufacturer: Farman Aviation Works
- Number built: 1

History
- First flight: 1933

The Farman F.380 was a French single-seat racing monoplane designed and built by the Farman Aviation Works for air racing.

== Development ==
The F.380 was a low-wing monoplane that first flew in 1933. It was similar but smaller than the contemporary F.370 and was powered by a 155 hp (116 kW) Renault Bengali inverted inline piston engine. Like the F.370 it had streamlined features, including a shallow fin faired into the open cockpit headrest, but unlike the F.370 the F.380's single main wheel could be retracted and extended manually. It was entered into the 1933 Coupe Deutsch de la Meurthe air race but the landing gear collapsed at the start of the race. Despite this setback, before the race it had broken the class world speed record at 303.387 km/h over a 200 km course.

== Specifications (F.380) ==
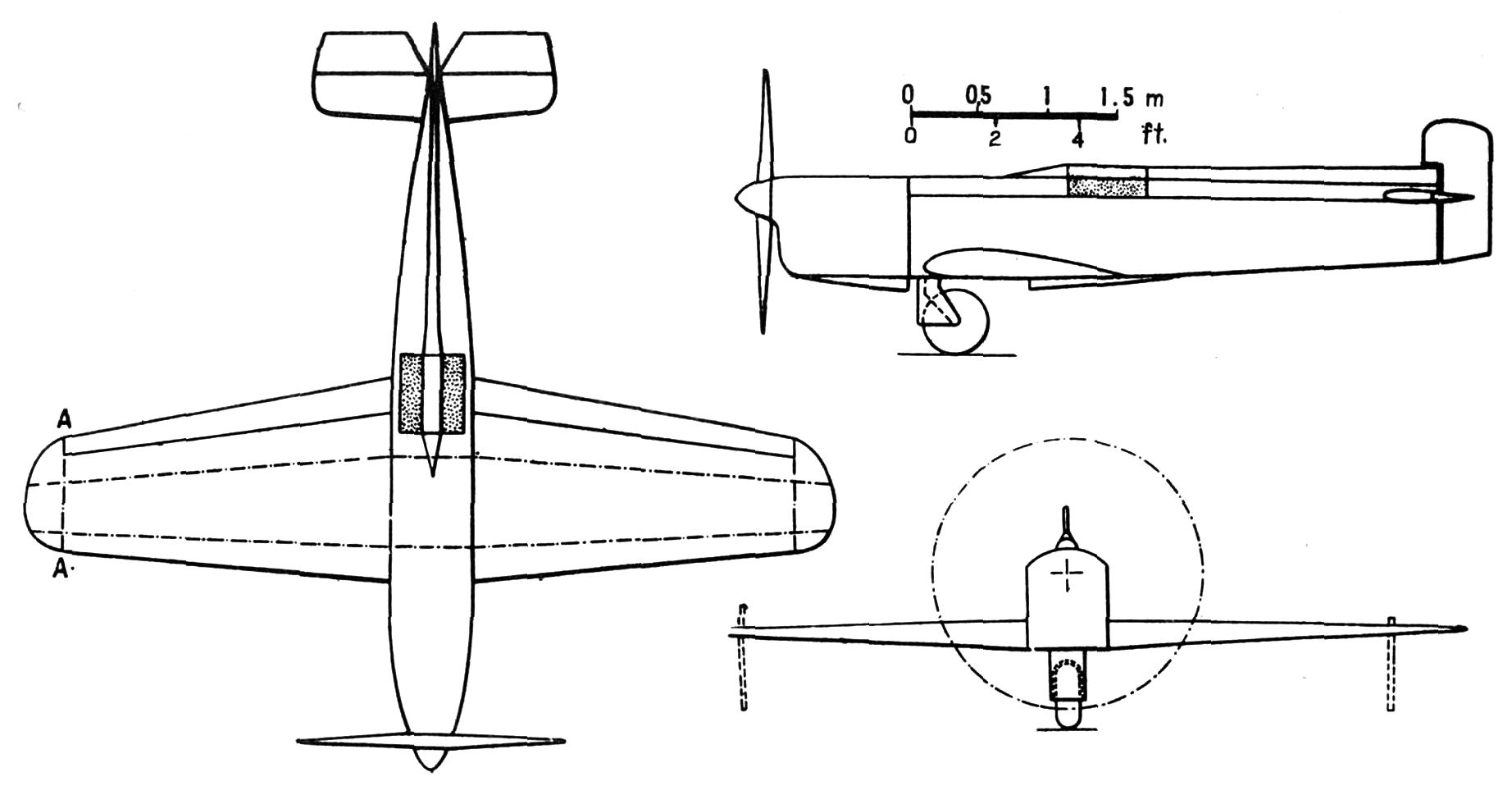
Farman F.380 3-view drawing from NACA-TM-724

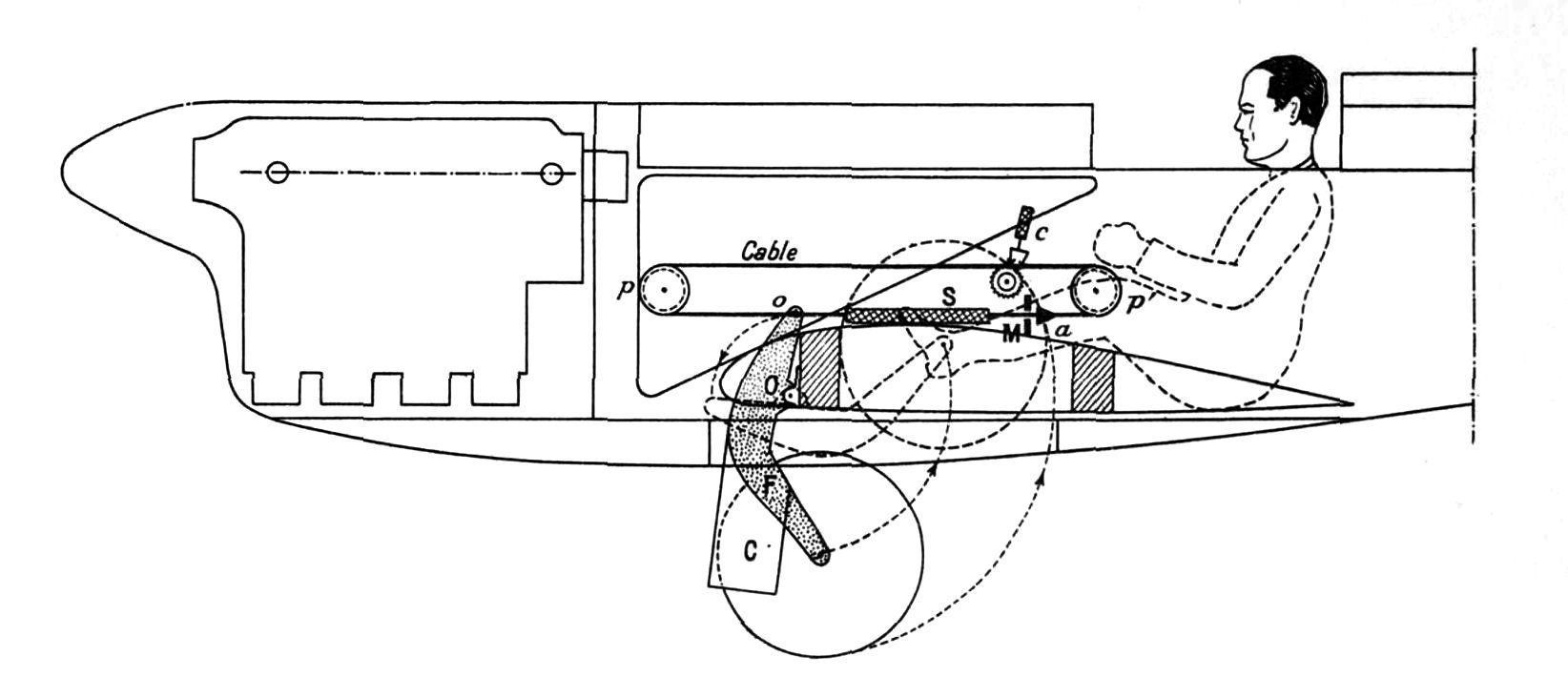
Farman F.380 landing gear detail drawing from NACA-TM-724

Data from

General characteristics

- Crew: 1
- Length: 5.50 m (18 ft 1 in)
- Wingspan: 5.98 m (19 ft 7 in)
- Wing area: 6.00 m^{2} (64.6 sq ft)
- Empty weight: 320 kg (705 lb)
- Max takeoff weight: 550 kg (1,213 lb)
- Powerplant: 1 × Renault Bengali 4-cylinder inverted inline piston engine, 116 kW (155 hp) estimated
