= Farman F.31 =

F.31

General information
- Type: Fighter
- National origin: France
- Manufacturer: Farman
- Designer: Henry Farman
- Number built: 1

History
- First flight: Summer 1918

The Farman F.31 was a French fighter prototype of the 1910s, the second foray into fighter design by Farman, a firm more usually associated with bombers. The project was short-lived, lasting only 3 months.

== Development ==
The F.31 was a two-seat fighter, designed around the Liberty 12 engine. It was exceptionally angular, and equi-span with the fuselage mounted between its two bays.

== Operational history ==
The sole prototype was completed and first flown in the summer of 1918. Testing was still ongoing in November 1918, when the Armistice ended the project and no further development continued.

== Specifications ==
Data from The Complete Book of Fighters

General characteristics

- Crew: 2
- Length: 7.35 m (24 ft 1 in)
- Wingspan: 11.76 m (38 ft 7 in)
- Height: 2.58 m (8 ft 6 in)
- Empty weight: 869 kg (1,916 lb)
- Gross weight: 1,469 kg (3,239 lb)
- Powerplant: 1 × Liberty L-12 V-12 water-cooled pisaton engine, 300 kW (400 hp)
- Propellers: 2-bladed fixedf-pitch propeller

Performance

- Maximum speed: 215 km/h (134 mph, 116 kn) at 2,000 m (6,600 ft)
- Time to altitude: 2,000 m (6,600 ft) in 5.85 minutes

Armament

- Guns: 2 × fixed forward-firing 7.7 mm (0.303 in) Vickers gun

1 × rear-mounted swivelling 7.7 mm (0.303 in) Lewis gun

== Bibliography ==
- Liron, Jean (1984). Les avions Farman. Collection Docavia. Vol. 21. Paris: Éditions Larivière. OCLC 37146471.
