= Farman B.2 =

General information
- Type: Light day bomber
- National origin: France
- Manufacturer: Farman
- Number built: 1

History
- First flight: 1920s

The Farman B.2 was a 1920s French biplane designed as a light day bomber. Only one was built.

== Development ==
Farman Aviation Works designed and built in 1924 what was a bulky unequal span two-bay biplane for use as a day bomber. The pilot had a cockpit forward of the wing leading edge, the observer/gunner had a cockpit in a cut-out in the wing trailing edge. The B.2 was tested with different combinations of engines and radiators and it required modification to the fin and rudder for problems with directional stability. Despite all these modifications the aircraft did not meet the required performance and was not ordered into production.

== Specifications ==
Data from

General characteristics

- Crew: 2 (pilot, observer/gunner)
- Length: 10.70 m (35 ft 1.25 in)
- Wingspan: 17.0 m (55 ft 9.25 in)
- Height: 3.90 m (12 ft 9.5 in)
- Wing area: 63 m^{2} (678.15 sq ft)
- Empty weight: 1,360 kg (2,998 lb)
- Gross weight: 2,460 kg (5,423 lb)
- Powerplant: 1 × Lorraine-Dietrich 12-cylinder Vee piston engine , 276 kW (370 hp)

Performance

- Maximum speed: 185 km/h (115 mph, 100 kn)

Armament

- 3 × 0.303in (7.7mm) machine gun
- 300kg (661lb) of bombs

== Bibliography ==
- The Illustrated Encyclopedia of Aircraft (Part Work 1982-1985). Orbis Publishing.
- Liron, Jean (1984). Les avions Farman. Collection Docavia. Vol. 21. Paris: Éditions Larivière. OCLC 37146471.
