= Farman F.220 =

1932 bomber aircraft family by Farman

F.220
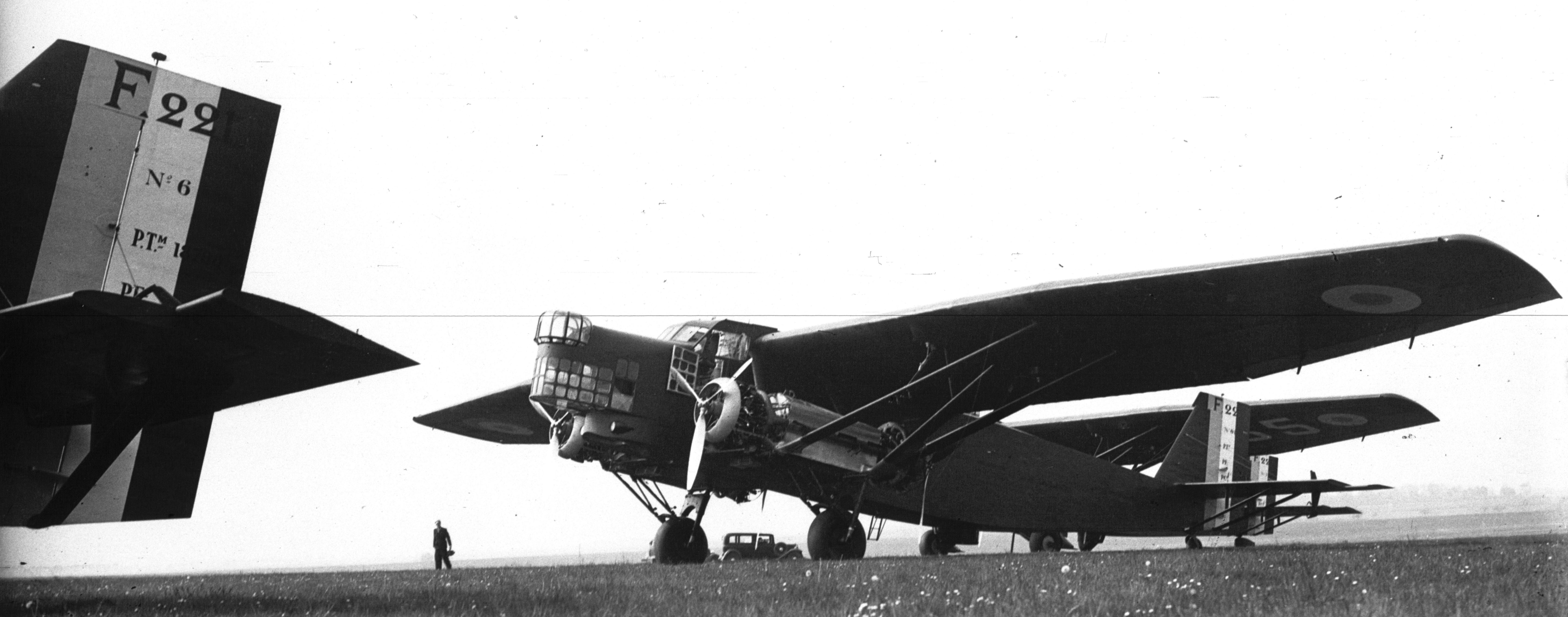
- Farman F.221 bombers in May 1936

General information
- Type: Heavy bomber
- National origin: France
- Manufacturer: Farman Aviation Works
- Primary user: French Air Force
- Number built: ca. 80

History
- Manufactured: 1935-1938
- First flight: 26 May 1932

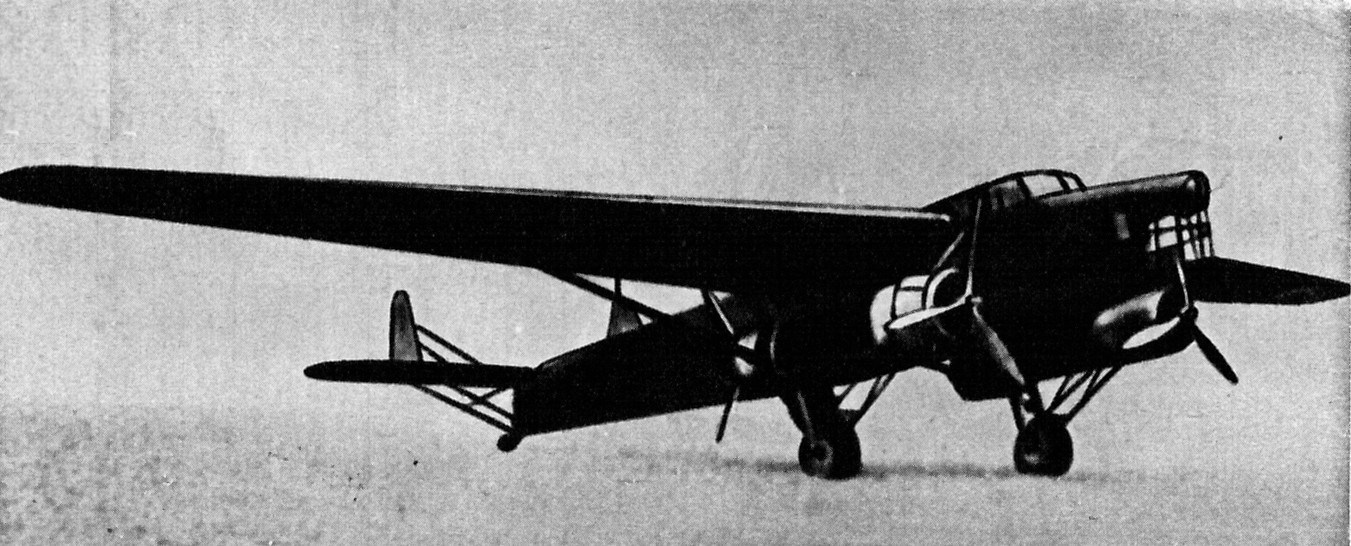
Farman F.223

The Farman F.220 and its derivatives were thick-sectioned, high-winged, four engined French monoplanes from Farman Aviation Works. Based on the push-pull configuration proven by the F.211, design started in August 1925 and the first flight of the prototype was on 26 May 1932. The largest bomber to serve in France between the two world wars was the final F.222 variant. One variation was intended to be an airliner.

== Development ==
After testing the sole F.220 prototype, Farman made a number of changes to the design, including a new tail fin, fully enclosing the nose and ventral gunners' positions, and changing from V-engines to radials. The first example of this version, dubbed the F.221 flew in May 1933, and was followed by ten production examples delivered to the Armee de l'Air from June 1936. These machines featured hand-operated turrets for the three gunners' stations. Meanwhile, the prototype F.220 was sold to Air France, where christened Le Centaur, it flew as a mail plane on the South Atlantic route. This led to a batch of four similar aircraft being built for the airline.

The F.222 variant began to enter service with Armee de l'Air in the spring of 1937. Unlike its predecessor, this plane featured a retractable undercarriage. Twenty-four aircraft were produced with redesigned front fuselages and dihedral added to the outer wing. During World War II these planes were used in leaflet raids over Germany and then night bombing raids during May and June 1940. These resulted in three losses.

The Farman F.222 was involved in a notable operation carried out by French fighter pilot James Denis. On June 1940, realising that the Battle of France was lost, Denis borrowed a Farman F.222 from an airbase near Saint-Jean-d'Angély. He flew to Britain with twenty of his friends, and joined the Free French Air Force, in which service he subsequently became an ace, shooting down nine German aircraft.

The F.223 (redesignated NC.223 when Farman was absorbed into SNCAC) incorporated significant changes, including a twin tail and a considerably refined fuselage. The first prototype was ordered as a long-range mail plane and in October 1937 established a record by flying 621 miles with a 22,046 lb payload. The Ministère de l'Air ordered a production run of 8 of the NC223.3 variation which was commenced in 1939. A variant NC 223.4 Jules Verne, a mail delivery plane converted back into a bomber after requisition in the beginning of World War II, of French Naval Aviation was the first Allied bomber to raid Berlin: on the night of 7 June 1940 aircraft of this variant dropped eight 250 kg (551 lb) and eighty 10 kg (22 lb) bombs on the German capital. This operation, primarily carried out as a type of psychological warfare, was repeated three days later.

A Farman 223.3 in 1941

The first NC 223.3 bombers were delivered in May 1940 and participated in night bombing attacks on Germany before being transferred to French North Africa in June 1940. The bombers were subsequently relegated to transport roles, seeing service with both the Vichy regime and the Free French.

The F.224 was a dedicated civil variant able to seat 40 passengers. Six machines were produced for Air France, but were ultimately rejected because the 224 could not maintain altitude on three engines. The aircraft went on to serve in the Armée de l'Air instead with a reduced payload. Much of the known variants provided light carpet bombings of up to fifty-two 50 kg (110 lb) bombs, one of the largest payloads ever to be dropped from an aircraft at that time.

== Variants ==
Farman F.220

Farman F.220-01 — Prototype with Hispano-Suiza 12Lbr engines (1 built)
Farman F.220B — Mailplane (converted from F.220)
Farman F.220 — Production version of the F.220-01 (4 built)

Farman F.221
Revised version with enclosed gunners' positions, powered by 4× Gnome-Rhône 14Kdrs engines, (10 built, plus one F.221-01 prototype).
Farman F.222
Definitive production version

Farman F.222-01 — Prototype converted from the F.221-01
Farman F.222.1 — Revised version with retractable undercarriage and turrets, powered by 4× Gnome-Rhône 14Kirs engines (11 built)
Farman F.222.2 — F.222.1 with redesigned nose, powered by 4× Gnome-Rhône 14N-11 engines, (24 built).
Farman F.2220 — Airliner prototype for Air France as Ville de Dakar, powered by 4× Hispano-Suiza 12Xgrs engines, (1 built).

Farman F.223
Improved version with twin tail and revised aerodynamics, 1,100 hp (820 kW) Hispano-Suiza 14AA-08 / Hispano-Suiza 14AA-09 engines (redesignated SNCAC NC.223 when Farman was absorbed into SNCAC).

SNCAC NC.223-01 — Prototype, built as mailplane Laurent Guerrero, powered by 4× Hispano-Suiza 12Xirs engines. (1 built)
SNCAC NC.223.1 — Bomber prototype with Hispano-Suiza 12Xirs engines (1 built)
SNCAC NC.223.2 — Bomber version with 4× Gnome et Rhône 14N engines (not built)
SNCAC NC.223.3 — Bomber version with 4× 910 hp (679 kW) Hispano-Suiza 12Y-29 engines (15 built)
SNCAC NC.223.4 — Mailplanes built for Air France, powered by 4× Hispano-Suiza 12Y-37 engines (3 built: Camille Flammarion, Jules Verne, and Le Verrier)

Farman F.224
40-seat airliner with Gnome-Rhône 14N-01 engines for Air France but rejected (6 built)

Farman F.224TT — F.224s converted to troop transports for the Air Force.

== Operators ==
France

- Armée de l'Air
- Air France
- Aéronavale

Vichy France

- Vichy French Air Force

== Specifications (F.222/2) ==
Data from AviaFrance: Farman F-222/2

General characteristics

- Crew: 5
- Length: 22.57 m (74 ft 1 in)
- Wingspan: 35.65 m (117 ft 0 in)
- Height: 6.38 m (20 ft 11 in)
- Wing area: 184.6 m^{2} (1,987 sq ft)
- Empty weight: 11,000 kg (24,251 lb)
- Gross weight: 18,700 kg (41,226 lb)
- Powerplant: 4 × Gnome-Rhône 14N-11 14-cylinder air-cooled radial piston engines, 690 kW (920 hp) each - (2 pusher and 2 tractor in tandem nacelles)
- Propellers: 3-bladed variable-pitch metal propellers (2x tractor and 2xpusher)

Performance

- Maximum speed: 360 km/h (220 mph, 190 kn) at 3,960 m (12,990 ft)
- Cruise speed: 280 km/h (170 mph, 150 kn) at 3,960 m (12,990 ft)
- Range: 2,200 km (1,400 mi, 1,200 nmi)
- Service ceiling: 8,000 m (26,000 ft)
- Time to altitude: 4,000 m (13,000 ft) in 13 minutes 30 seconds

Armament

- Guns: three 7.5mm MAC 1934 manually aimed in nose turret, dorsal and ventral positions
- Bombs: 2,200 kg (4,900 lb) of bombs

== See also ==
Related lists

- List of interwar military aircraft
- List of aircraft of World War II
- List of military aircraft of France
- List of bomber aircraft
