= Farman F.130 =

French biplane

General information
- Type: Long-range night bomber
- National origin: France
- Manufacturer: Farman

History
- First flight: 1925

The Farman F.130 was a 1920s French biplane designed by Farman as a long-range day bomber.

== Development ==
The F.130 was a single-engined biplane design in the BN.3 category, based on the larger twin-engined F.60 Goliath. The F.130 had a conventional tailskid landing gear and three open tandem cockpits. It was powered by a nose-mounted 447 kW (600 hp) Farman 18Wd W-18 piston engine.

Following a series of test flights it was underpowered with only one engine, and it failed to arouse any interest from either domestic or export customers and was not ordered into production.

== Variants ==
F.130 BN.3
Three seater night bomber, one built.
F.130T
The almost identical transport variant of the F.130 bomber. One built.

== Specifications ==
Data from

General characteristics

- Crew: 3
- Wingspan: 25.30 m (83 ft 0 in)
- Wing area: 150 m^{2} (1,614.64 sq ft)
- Empty weight: 3,230 kg (7,121 lb)
- Gross weight: 5,570 kg (12,280 lb)
- Powerplant: 1 × Farman 18Wd W-18 water-cooled piston engine , 447 kW (600 hp)

Performance

- Maximum speed: 195 km/h (121 mph, 105 kn)
- Service ceiling: 5,200 m (17,060 ft)

Armament

- 4 × 0.303in (7.7mm) machine guns
- up to 700kg (1543lb) bombs

== Bibliography ==
- The Illustrated Encyclopedia of Aircraft (Part Work 1982-1985). Orbis Publishing.
- Liron, Jean (1984). Les avions Farman. Collection Docavia. Vol. 21. Paris: Éditions Larivière. OCLC 37146471.
