= Farman F.400 =

1930s French monoplane

F.400
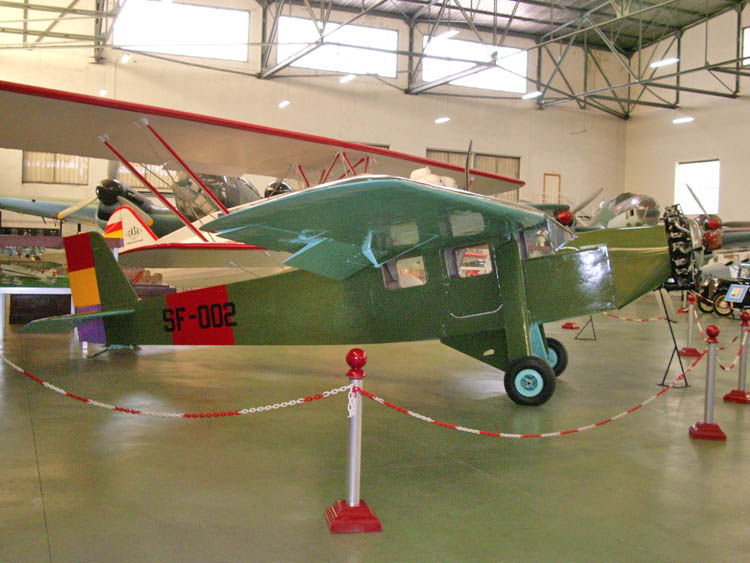
- F.402 of the Spanish Republican Air Force. Museo del Aire, Cuatro Vientos, Madrid

General information
- Type: Three-seat Cabin monoplane
- Manufacturer: Farman

History
- First flight: 1934

The Farman F 400 was a 1930s French three-seat cabin high-winged monoplane which was designed and built by Farman.

== Design and development ==
The Farman series "400" was a revolution for its builder because it had a thin, cantilever-constructed, high wing, with round edges, which could be dismounted for better storage and transportation.

The aeroplane had mixed construction. The fuselage was made of steel tubes, while the wings had a wood frame. The fuselage and the wings are both covered with plywood.

This version, the Farman F 402, had a Lorraine 5 Pb 5-cylinder radial engine of 110 hp (82 kW), but the plane in the picture had it changed for a 9-cylinder radial engine Salmson of 120 hp (89 kW).

The F 402 has an unusual feature, which is that the control stick hangs from the ceiling of the cockpit, and the rudder control is a vertical steering wheel.

The fuel tanks, which are placed inside the wings, have a capacity of 200 liters.

The landing gear structure is constructed of iron bars, which allows this plane to land "hardly" in short space.

This aircraft served, among other countries, in Spain, during the 1936-1939 civil war, on both sides.

== Variants ==
Closeup of the Salmson 9-cylinder, 120 hp (89 kW), radial engine and the wooden propeller

F.400
Three-seat cabin monoplane.
F.402
Powered by a 120hp (89-kW) Lorraine 5Pb radial piston engine.
F.403
Powered by a 150hp (112-kW) Farman 7Ed engine.
F.404
Similar to the F.403, powered by a 140hp (89kW) Renault 4Pei engine.
F.405
Powered by a 110hp (82kW) Lorraine 5Pb radial piston engine.
F.406
Powered by a 125hp (93kW) de Havilland Gipsy Major piston engine.

== Operators ==
France

- French Air Force

Spain

- Spanish Republican Air Force

== Surviving aircraft ==
One aircraft of the Spanish Republican Air Force survives and is on display at the Spanish Museo del Aire (Madrid). This plane was used in Zaragoza during the Spanish Civil War as a transport, communication and ambulance aircraft.

== Specifications (F 402) ==
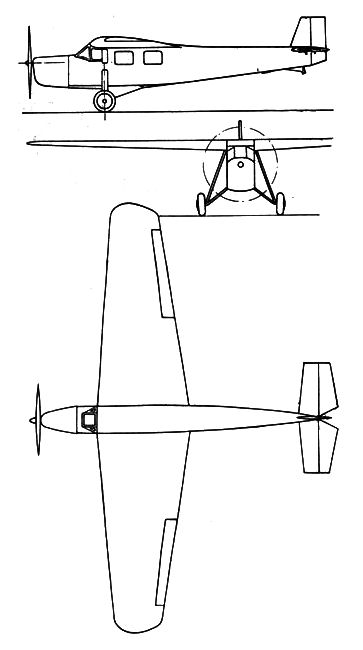
Farman F.400 3-view drawing from L'Aerophile February 1933

Data from

General characteristics

- Crew: 1
- Capacity: 2 pax
- Length: 8.25 m (27 ft 1 in)
- Wingspan: 11.72 m (38 ft 5 in)
- Height: 2.07 m (6 ft 9 in)
- Wing area: 21.5 m^{2} (231 sq ft)
- Empty weight: 681 kg (1,501 lb)
- Gross weight: 1,150 kg (2,535 lb)
- Powerplant: 1 × Lorraine 5Pb 5-cylinder air-cooled radial piston engine, 82–89 kW (110–120 hp)
- Propellers: 2-bladed fixed-pitch propeller

Performance

- Maximum speed: 194 km/h (121 mph, 105 kn)
- Cruise speed: 170 km/h (110 mph, 92 kn)
- Range: 1,000 km (620 mi, 540 nmi)
- Service ceiling: 4,000 m (13,000 ft)
- Wing loading: 53.5 kg/m^{2} (11.0 lb/sq ft)
- Power/mass: 0.078 kW/kg (0.047 hp/lb)

== See also ==
- Farman Aviation Works
- Henry Farman

== Bibliography ==
- Liron, Jean (1984). Les avions Farman. Collection Docavia. Vol. 21. Paris: Éditions Larivière. OCLC 37146471.
