= F500 =

F500 may refer to:

- Formula 500, a regulated racing series for vehicles powered by two-cylinder, water-cooled two-stroke engines.
- Fiat 500, a historical two-door vehicle series produced by Fiat Automobiles from 1957 to 1975.
- Fortune 500, an annual list compiled and published by Fortune magazine that ranks 500 of the largest United States corporations by total revenue for their respective fiscal years.
- Ford F-500, a medium-duty truck
