= Los Angeles harbor =

Los Angeles harbor may refer to:

- Port of Los Angeles, and nearby Port of Long Beach in San Pedro Bay
- Los Angeles Harbor Region, an area of land in Los Angeles City/County sited near the seaports
- Los Angeles Harbor College
- Los Angeles Harbor Light
- Redondo Beach, California, on Santa Monica Bay, an early port and now host to King Harbor
- Marina del Rey, California, on Santa Monica Bay, the county's small-craft harbor (opened 1965)
- Port Ballona, California, failed harbor scheme circa 1887
- Long Wharf (Santa Monica), a.k.a. Port Los Angeles (1892–1920)

== See also ==
- Harbor Gateway, Los Angeles
