= Farman F.230 =

Group of French aircraft

F.230, F.350, and F.360 family
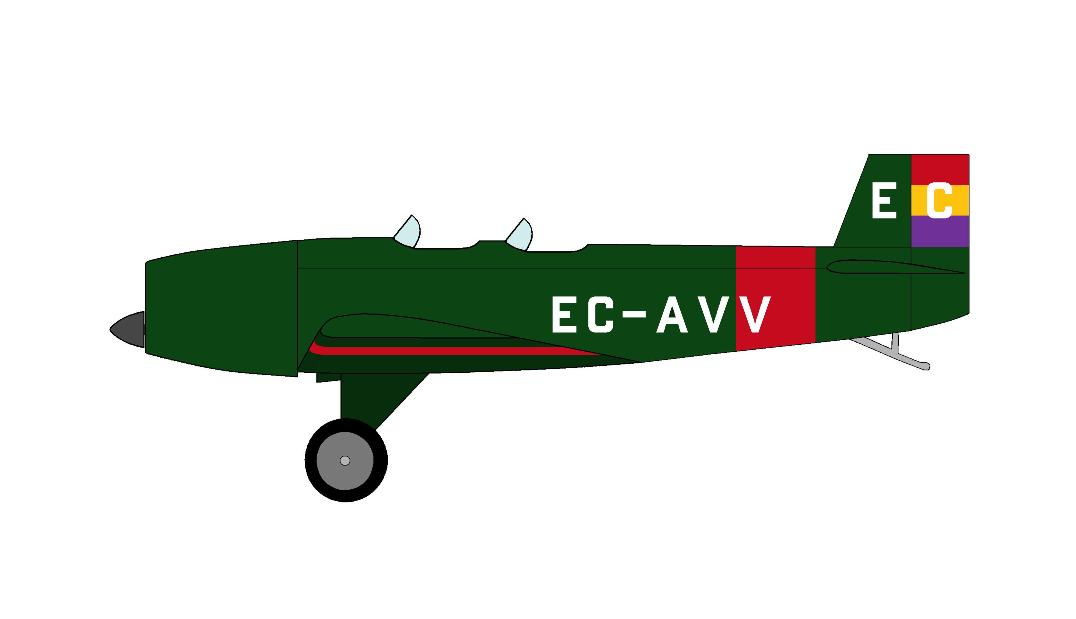
- Farman F.354 of the Spanish Republican Air Force

General information
- Type: Touring aircraft
- National origin: France
- Manufacturer: Farman

History
- First flight: 1930

The Farman F.230 and its derivatives were a family of light touring aircraft built in France in the 1930s. They were low-wing cantilever monoplanes of conventional configuration, with fixed tailskid undercarriage and two open cockpits in tandem. The thick-section wing used on these designs was a distinguishing feature.

A Farman F.231 was featured in the Cigars of the Pharaoh, the fourth volume of The Adventures of Tintin comics series by Belgian cartoonist Hergé.

== Operational history ==
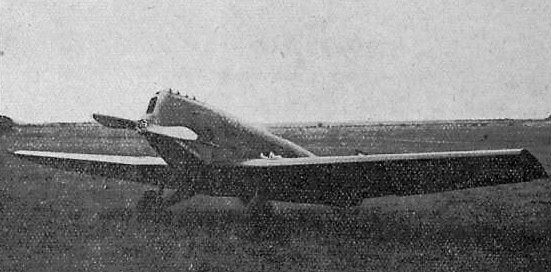
Farman F.231 photo from Annuaire de L'Aéronautique 1931

During the course of the 1930s decade, aircraft of this family held various world records in their class for speed, altitude, duration, and distance; the F.356 model alone held no fewer than 18 such records.

Typical of these exploits was Marcel Lalouette and Jean de Permangle's long-distance flight on 12 January 1931, where they flew an F.231 from Istres, France, to Villa Cisneros, in colonial West Africa during which they covered 2,700 km (1,690 mi) in 22 hours and set a new distance record. In another feat, Jean Réginensi and André Bailly set three world airspeed records in October 1933 (over 100 km, 500 km, and 1,000 km) flying a F.239.

== Variants ==
=== F.230 ===
- F.230 - initial version with Salmson 9Ad engine (11 built)
  - F.230bis - conversion of F.230 (1 converted)
- F.231 - version with Renault 4Pb engine (47 built)
  - F.231bis - seaplane version of F.231 (1 converted)
- F.232 - version with Michel IV-AT3 engine (4 built)
- F.233 - version with de Havilland Gipsy I engine (1 built)
- F.234 - version with Salmson 7Ac engine (16 built)
- F.235 - version with Hispano-Suiza 6Pa engine (1 built)
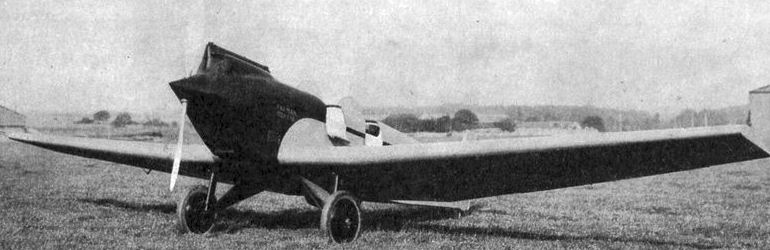
  Farman F.235 photo from L'Aerophile Salon 1932
- F.236 - version with Salmson 9Ad engine (4 built)
- F.237 - similar to the F.235, but powered by a 100-hp (75-kW) Renault engine.
- F.238 - version with de Havilland Gipsy III engine (1 built)
- F.239 - version with Pobjoy R engine (1 built)

=== F.350 ===
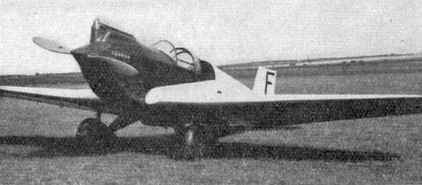
Farman F.358 photo from L'Aerophile July 1933

- F.350 - version with Renault 4Pb engine (2 built, plus 4 converted from F.231)
- F.351 - version with Renault 4Pb engine and enclosed cabin (1 built, plus 1 converted from F.231)
- F.352 - version with Salmson 7Ac engine (1 built, plus 1 converted from F.234)
  - F.352H - seaplane version of F.352 (1 built, plus 1 converted from F.234)
- F.353 - version with de Havilland Gipsy III engine (1 built)
- F.354 - version with de Havilland Gipsy I engine (1 built)
- F.355 - version with Renault 4Pdi engine (1 built)
- F.356 - version with Renault 4Pc engine (1 built)
- F.357 - version with Renault 4Pdi engine (1 built)
- F.358 - version with Hispano-Suiza 6Pa engine (1 built)
- F.359 - version with de Havilland Gipsy III engine (1 built)

=== F.360 ===
- F.360 - version with Salmson 9Ad engine (1 built)
- F.361 - version with Salmson 9Adr engine (2 converted from F.236)

== Operators ==
Spanish Republic

- Spanish Republican Air Force F.350

== Specifications (F.231) ==
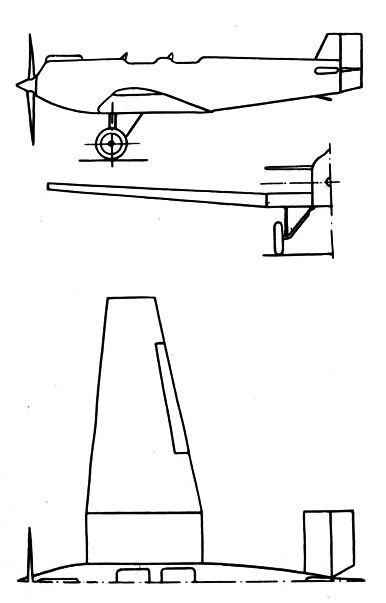
Farman F.235 3-view drawing from L'Aerophile Salon 1932

General characteristics

- Crew: One pilot
- Capacity: 1 passenger
- Length: 6.13 m (20 ft 1 in)
- Wingspan: 9.14 m (30 ft 0 in)
- Height: 2.13 m (7 ft 0 in)
- Wing area: 15.8 m^{2} (170 sq ft)
- Empty weight: 411 kg (906 lb)
- Gross weight: 678 kg (1,495 lb)
- Powerplant: 1 × Renault 4Pb , 71 kW (95 hp)

Performance

- Maximum speed: 186 km/h (116 mph, 101 kn)
- Range: 450 km (280 mi, 240 nmi)
- Service ceiling: 5,000 m (16,400 ft)

== See also ==
Related lists

- List of aircraft of the Spanish Republican Air Force

== Bibliography ==
- Liron, Jean (1984). Les avions Farman. Collection Docavia. Vol. 21. Paris: Éditions Larivière. OCLC 37146471.
- Moulin, Jacques & Cony, Christophe (May 2001). "L'aviation était toute sa vie: Léna Bernstein" [Aviation was Her Whole Life: Léna Bernstein]. Avions: Toute l'Aéronautique et son histoire (in French) (98): 59–60. ISSN 1243-8650.
- Taylor, Michael J. H. (1989). Jane's Encyclopedia of Aviation. London: Studio Editions. p. 380. ISBN 0-7106-0710-5.
- "A French Light 'Plane Record". Flight: 69. 23 January 1931.
- "A Pojoy Gets Three World's Records". Flight: 1077. 26 October 1933.
