= Farman F.150 =

F.150 Marin

General information
- Type: Biplane day bomber
- National origin: France
- Manufacturer: Farman

History
- First flight: 1926

The Farman F.150 was a 1920s French twin-engined biplane designed by Farman as a day bomber.

== Development ==
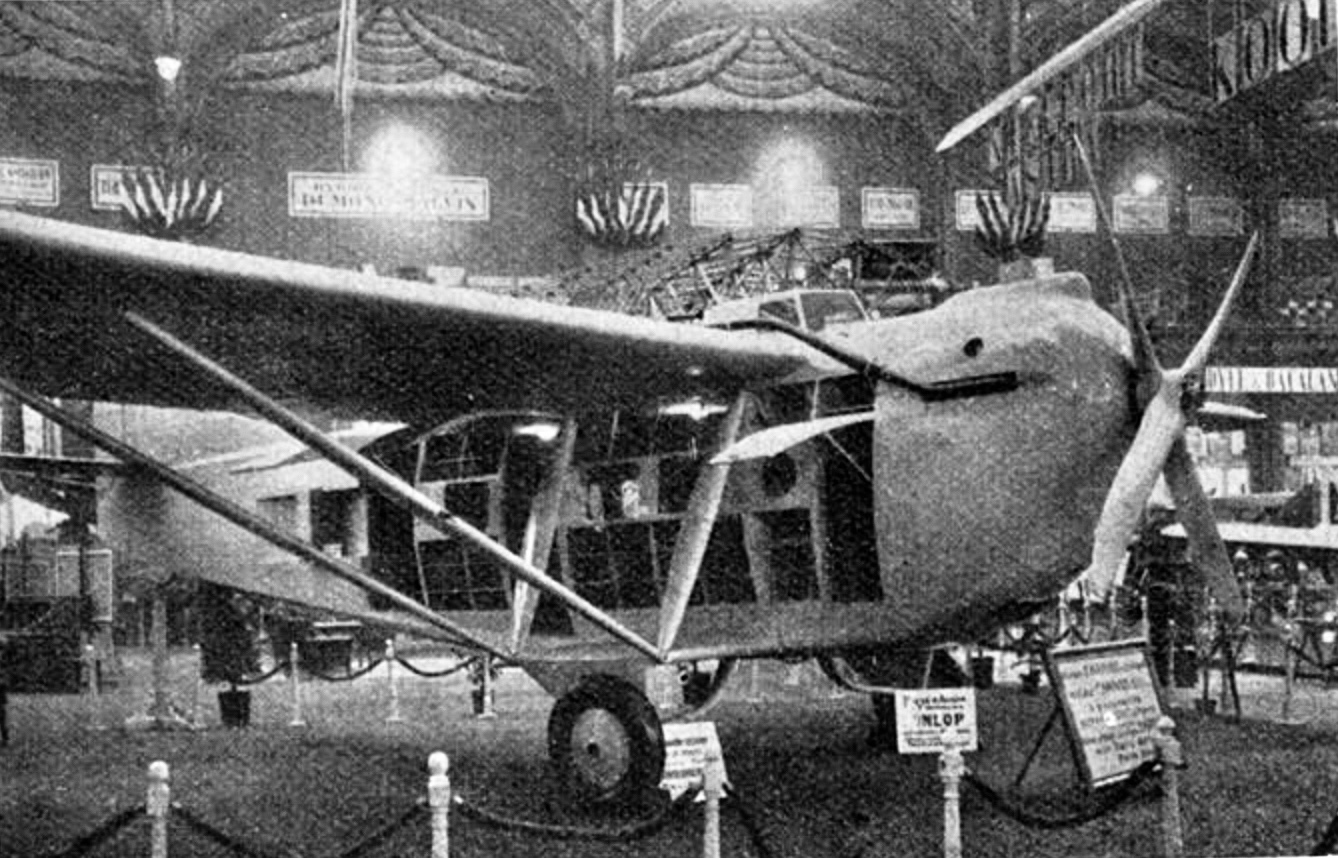
Farman F.150

The F.150 was a twin-engined unequal-span biplane to the B.3 specification, which could be fitted with fixed landing gear or floats. Although the design was an improvement on the earlier Goliath, it did not increase in performance, and it was not ordered into production.

== Variants ==
F.150
The original B.3 version powered by 2x 280 kW (380 hp) Gnome et Rhône 9Aa 9-cylinder radial piston engines, of which only one was built.
F.150bis
a smaller version powered by 2x 300 kW (400 hp) Lorraine 12Db V-12 piston engines, of which only two were built.
F.150 Marin
((in English) Marine) Floatplane bomber for Aeronavale.

== Specifications (F.150) ==
Data from Aviafrance F.150

General characteristics

- Crew: 3
- Length: 13.46 m (44 ft 2 in)
- Wingspan: 20.3 m (66 ft 7 in)
- Height: 4.32 m (14 ft 2 in)
- Wing area: 131 m^{2} (1,410 sq ft)
- Empty weight: 2,970 kg (6,548 lb)
- Gross weight: 5,270 kg (11,618 lb)
- Powerplant: 2 × Gnome et Rhône 9Aa 9-cyl. air-cooled radial piston engines, 280 kW (380 hp) each

Performance

- Maximum speed: 140 km/h (87 mph, 76 kn)
- Service ceiling: 4,400 m (14,400 ft)

Armament

- Guns: 4 × 7.7 mm (0.303 in) machine guns
- Bombs: 1,200 kg (2,600 lb) of bombs or a torpedo

== Bibliography ==
- Liron, Jean (1984). Les avions Farman. Collection Docavia. Vol. 21. Paris: Éditions Larivière. OCLC 37146471.
