= Curtiss XF13C =

1934 fighter aircraft in United States

XF13C
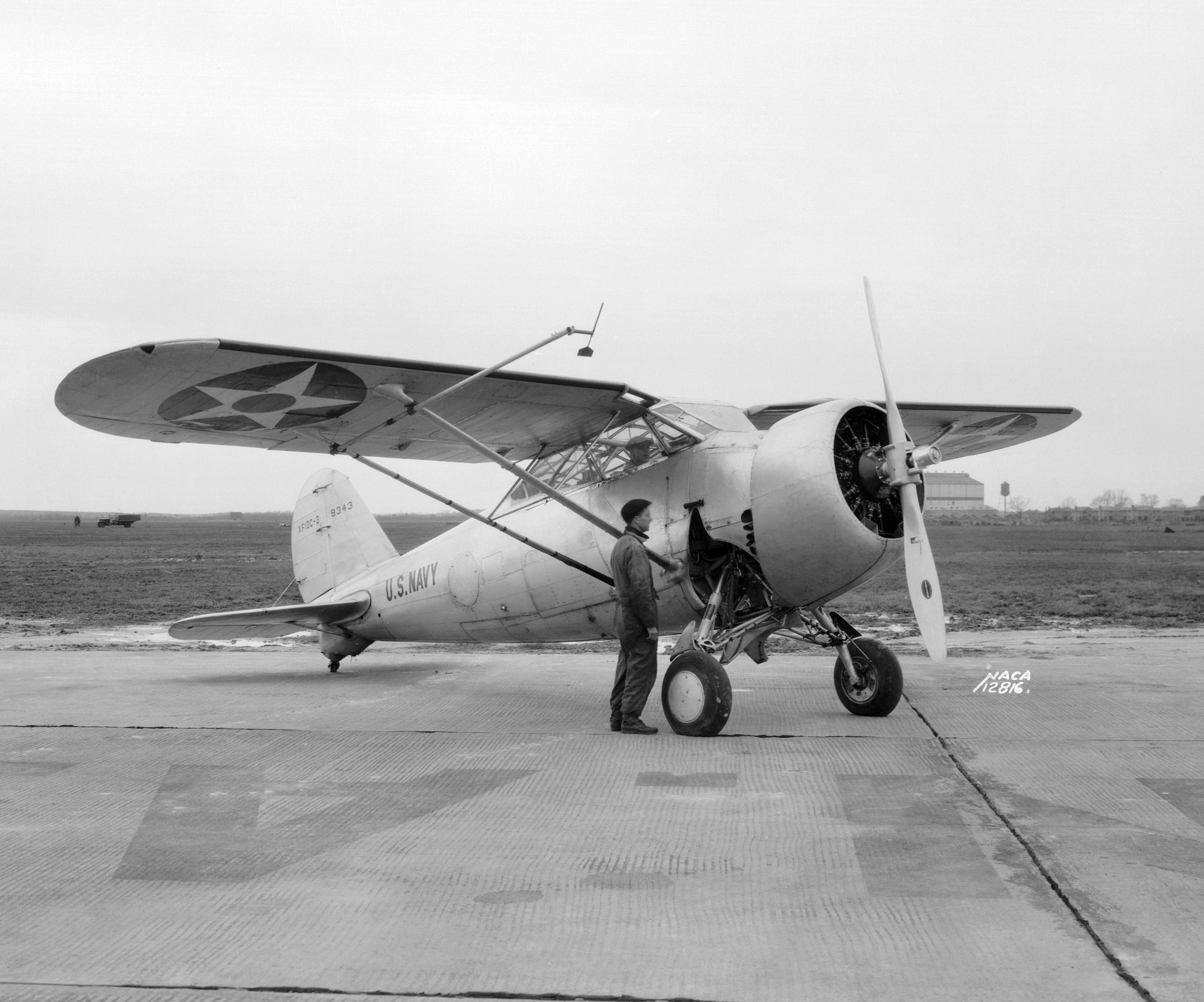
- Curtiss XF13C in 1937

General information
- Type: Fighter
- National origin: United States
- Manufacturer: Curtiss Aeroplane and Motor Company
- Number built: 3

History
- First flight: 7 January 1934

The Curtiss XF13C (Model 70) was a carrier-based fighter aircraft built by Curtiss Aeroplane and Motor Company.

== Development and design ==
The XF13C was a naval fighter featuring an all-metal construction, with a semi-monocoque fuselage, manually retractable landing gear and an enclosed cockpit. The aircraft was designed to facilitate conversions from biplane to monoplane and vice versa. The United States Navy bought a prototype, designated XF13C-1 when in monoplane configuration, and XF13C-2 when a biplane.

The XF13C first flew in 1934 with good results realized in tests. In 1935, the aircraft received a more powerful engine and modifications to the overly tall tailplanes. The designation was changed to XF13C-3 for more flight testing.

== Operational history ==
No production orders were received for the Curtis XF13C, but the aircraft continued to fly for NACA in experimental work, and by VWJ-1 Squadron at Quantico.

== Specifications (XF13C-3) ==
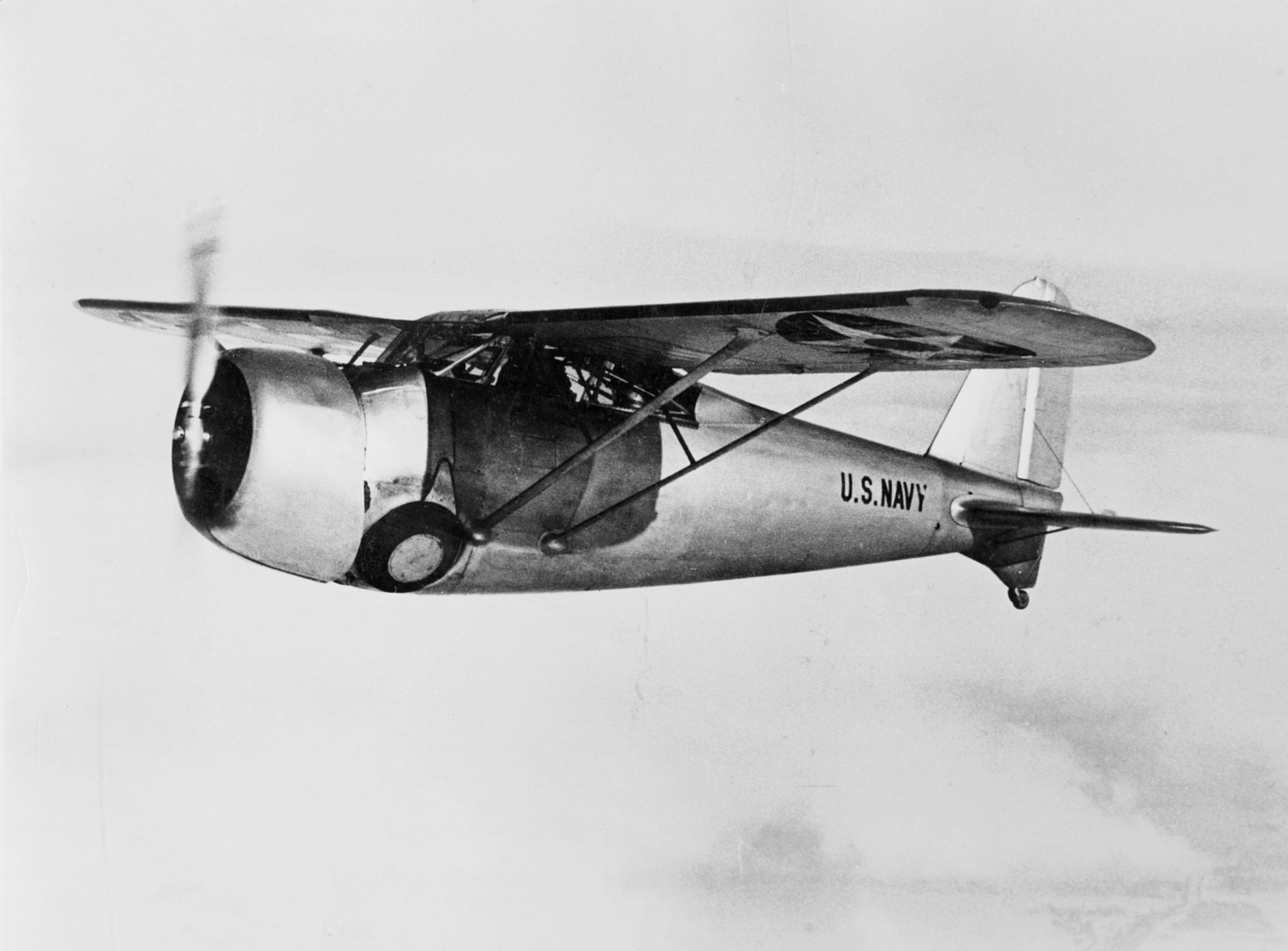
The XF13C-1 in flight, circa 1934.

Data from

General characteristics

- Crew: 1
- Length: 25 ft 0 in (7.62 m)
- Wingspan: 35 ft 0 in (10.66 m)
- Height: 8 ft 9.5 in (2.66 m)
- Wing area: 205 sq ft (19.04 m^{2})
- Empty weight: 3,412 lb (1,548 kg)
- Gross weight: 4,634 lb (2,102 kg)
- Powerplant: 1 × Wright SGR-1510-12 , 700 hp (520 kW)

Performance

- Maximum speed: 246 mph (396 km/h, 214 kn)
- Range: 726 mi (1,168 km, 631 nmi)
- Service ceiling: 25,250 ft (7,696 m)
- Rate of climb: 2,000 ft/min (10.16 m/s)

Armament

- 1 × .50 in (12.7 mm) machine gun
- 1 × .30 in (7.62 mm) machine gun

== See also ==
Aircraft of comparable role, configuration, and era

- Curtiss O-52 Owl
