= Farman F.51 =

General information
- Type: Maritime reconnaissance flying boat
- Manufacturer: Farman

History
- First flight: 1922

The Farman F.51 was a 1920s French maritime reconnaissance flying boat designed and built by Farman. The F.51 was an unequal-span four-bay biplane flying boat with a crew of four. It was powered by two Lorraine 8bd engines mounted in tractor configuration. A pusher engined version was designated the Farman F.50 (even though the designation had been used before in 1919). Tested by the French Navy but it failed to win any orders, Farman did briefly consider a civil version but the project was abandoned.

== Variants ==
F.50
Two Lorraine 8bd V-8 piston engines in pusher-configuration.
F.51
Two Lorraine 8bd V-8 piston engines in tractor-configuration.

== Operators ==
Brazil

- Brazilian Naval Aviation

== Specifications (F.51) ==
Data from The Illustrated Encyclopedia of Aircraft (Part Work 1982–1985), 1985, Orbis Publishing, Page 1737

General characteristics

- Crew: 4 (pilot, co-pilot, navigator, observer/gunner)
- Length: 14.85 m (48 ft 8.75 in)
- Wingspan: 23.35 m (76 ft 7.25 in)
- Height: 4.40 m (14 ft 5.25 in)
- Empty weight: 2,220 kg (4,894 lb)
- Powerplant: 2 × Lorraine 8bd V-8 water-cooled piston engines , 205 kW (275 hp) each

Performance

- Maximum speed: 140 km/h (87 mph, 76 kn)

Armament

- 4 × 0.303 in (7.7 mm) machine-gun (two each in bow and midships cockpits)
- 400 kg (882 lb) bombs

== See also ==
Related lists

- List of flying boats and floatplanes
