= Farman F.50 =

French WW1 bomber aircraft

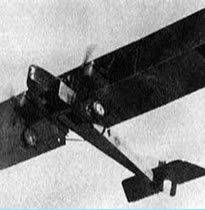
- Farman F.50, Mexican Air Force, 1920s.

General information
- Type: Biplane bomber
- Manufacturer: Farman
- Primary user: French Air Force
- Number built: >100

History
- Introduction date: 1918
- First flight: 1918
- Retired: 1920s

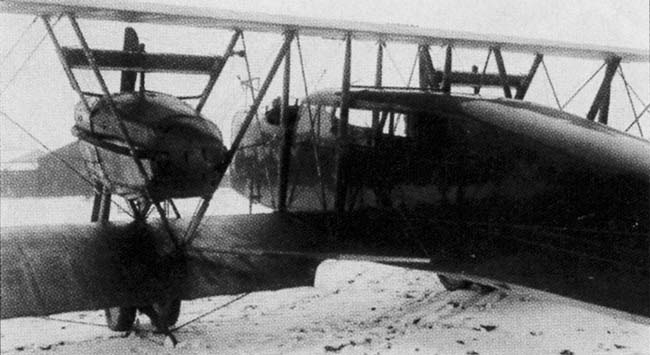
Civil use Farman F.50P, with a cabin for up to five passengers

The Farman F.50 was a French twin-engined night bomber designed and built by Farman Aviation Works as a replacement for the single-engined Voisin pusher biplanes in service with the French Air Force.

== Development ==
The twin-engined F.50 flew for the first time in early 1918, powered by two 180 kW (240 hp) Lorraine 8Bb engines, as an unequal-span biplane with a slab-sided fuselage and a single fin and rudder. It had a fixed tailskid landing gear with twin wheels on the main gear, an open cockpit for the pilot and gunner/observer, and a gunner position in the nose. It was equipped with a 7.7 mm machine gun forward and aft.

The two engines, 205 kW (275 hp) Lorraine 8Bd V-8s on production aircraft, were mounted between the wings using vee bracing struts. With the Armistice, production was less than 100 aircraft, but the company designed a passenger conversion for civil use, designated F.50P, with the fuselage behind the cockpit raised and enclosed to create a glazed cabin for up to five passengers. One example was used by Compagnie des Grands Express Aeriens from July 1920 from Paris to London and Amsterdam.

== Operational history ==
With the military designation Bn.2 (2-seat night bomber) the aircraft were delivered to squadrons within 1e Groupe de Bombardement. Three escadrilles (S25, F114 and F119) had been equipped by the time of the Armistice in November 1918, with 45 F.50s in service. With the end of the war the aircraft did not have time to influence the campaign and the aircraft continued to serve until at least 1922.

Two aircraft were sold to the United States after the war.

== Variants ==
F.50
Twin-engine night bomber.
F.50P
Five-passenger conversion.

== Operators ==
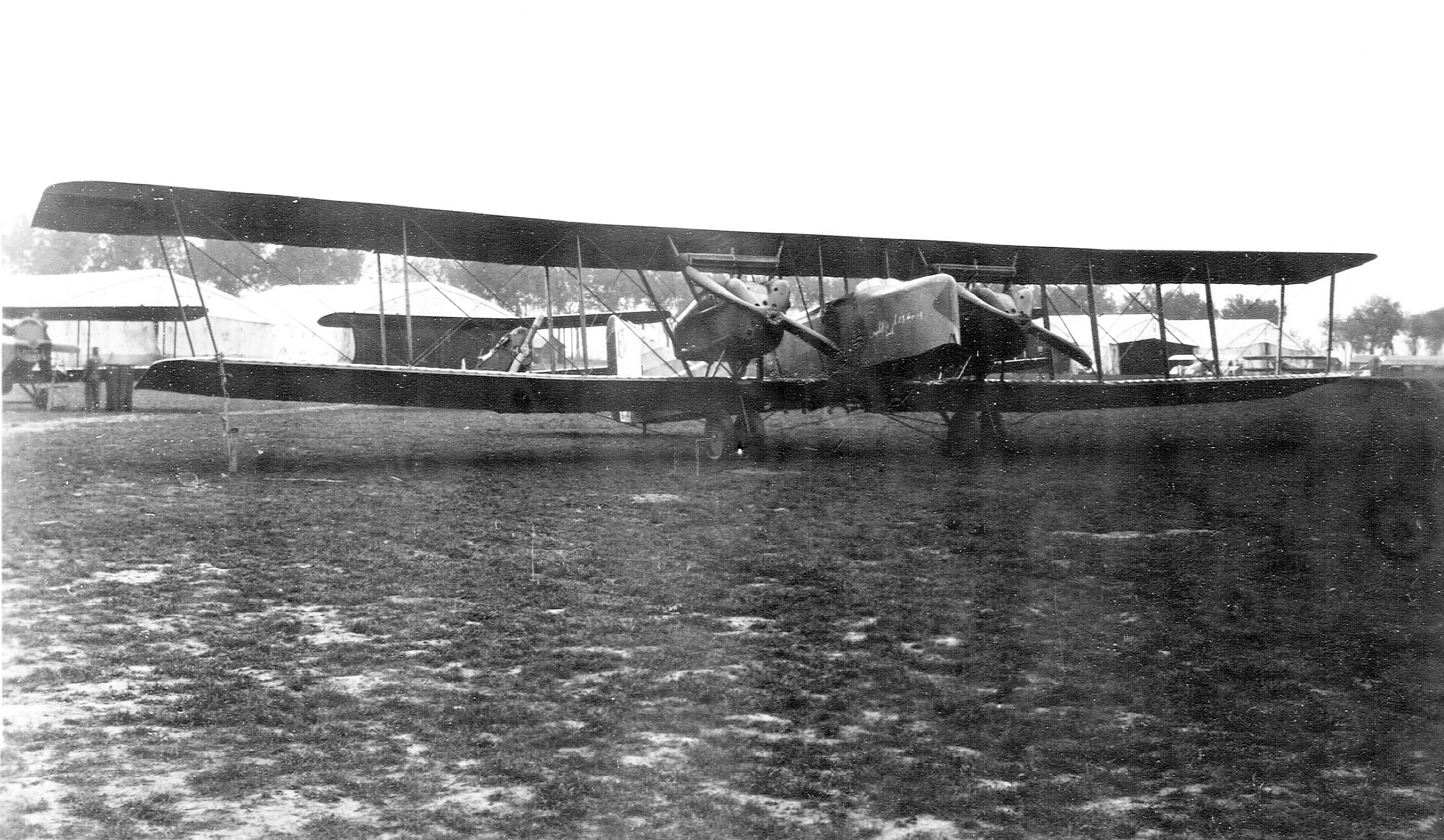
Farman F.50 at the Air Service, United States Army Air Service Production Center No. 2, Romorantin Aerodrome, France, 1918

France

- Air Union (F.50P)
- Compagnie des Grands Express Aériens -(F.50P)
- French Air Force

Japan

- Imperial Japanese Army Air Service - One F.50.

Mexico

- Mexican Air Force - Thirteen F.50 bought in September 1920.

== Specifications (F.50) ==
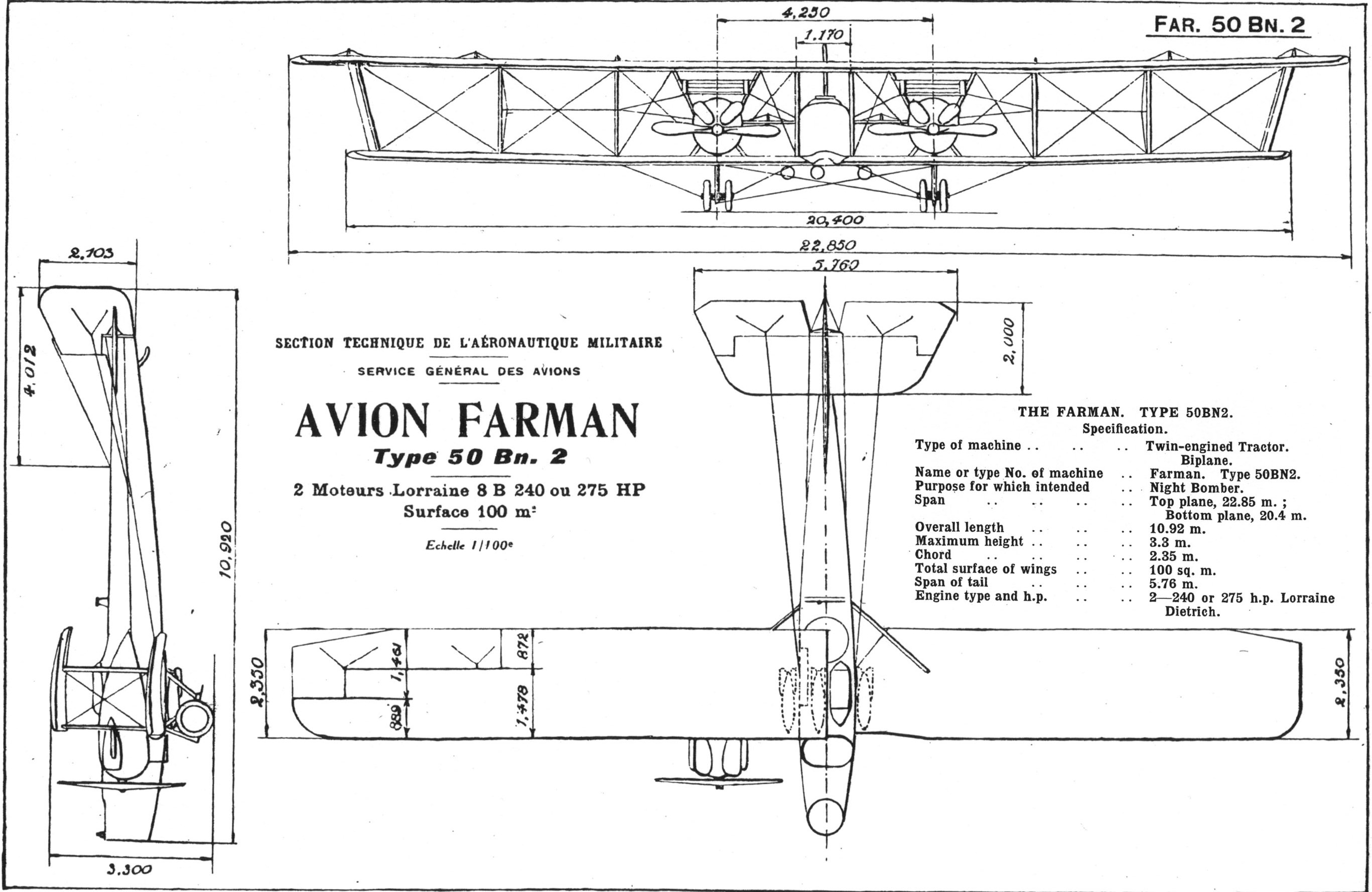
Farman 50 Bn.2 two seat twin engine night bomber

Data from The Illustrated Encyclopedia of Aircraft (Part Work 1982-1985), 1985, Orbis Publishing, Page 1736/7

General characteristics

- Crew: 3
- Length: 10.92 m (35 ft 10 in)
- Wingspan: 22.85 m (74 ft 11.5 in)
- Height: 3.30 m (10 ft 10 in)
- Wing area: 101.60 m^{2} (1,093.6 sq ft)
- Empty weight: 1,815 kg (4,001 lb)
- Gross weight: 2,120 kg (6,878 lb)
- Powerplant: 2 × Lorraine 8Db V-8 water-cooled piston engines , 205 kW (275 hp) each

Performance

- Maximum speed: 150 km/h (93 mph, 81 kn)
- Range: 420 km (261 mi, 227 nmi)
- Service ceiling: 4,750 m (15,580 ft)

Armament

- 2 x 0.303in (7.7 mm) machine-guns in nose
- 8 x 40 kg (88lb) bombs on underfuselage/wing racks

== Bibliography ==
- The Illustrated Encyclopedia of Aircraft (Part Work 1982–1985), 1985, Orbis Publishing, Page 1736/7
- Liron, Jean (1984). Les avions Farman. Collection Docavia. Vol. 21. Paris: Éditions Larivière. OCLC 37146471.
- Passingham, Malcolm (February 1999). "Les bombardiers de l'Armée japonaise (1920–1935)" [Japanese Army Bombers (1920–1935)]. Avions: Toute l'aéronautique et son histoire (in French) (71): 32–38. ISSN 1243-8650.
