= André Bailly =

Belgian politician (1942–2023)

Member of the Parliament of Wallonia
- In office 2001–2004
- Preceded by: Edmund Stoffels

Personal details
- Born: 11 February 1942 Verviers, German-occupied Belgium
- Died: 22 February 2023 (aged 81) Verviers, Belgium
- Party: PS

André Bailly (11 February 1942 – 22 February 2023) was a Belgian politician. A member of the Socialist Party, he served in the Parliament of Wallonia from 2001 to 2004.

Bailly died in Verviers on 22 February 2023, at the age of 81.
