= Farman F.370 =

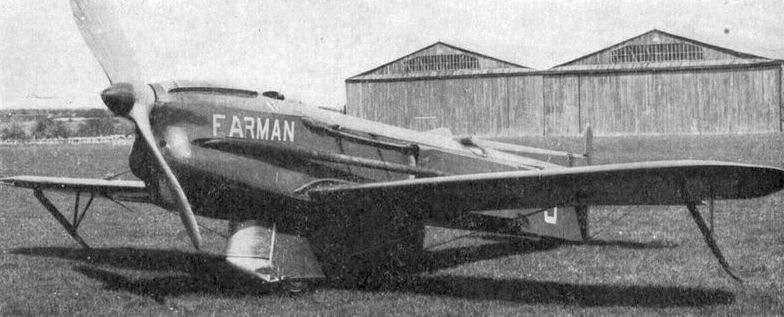

General information
- Type: Single-seat racing monoplane
- National origin: France
- Manufacturer: Farman Aviation Works
- Number built: 1

History
- First flight: 22 April 1933

The Farman F.370 was a French single-seat racing monoplane designed and built by the Farman Aviation Works for air racing.

== Development ==
The F.370 was a low-wing monoplane that first flew on the 22 April 1933. Powered by a Farman 8 Vee-piston engine it had streamlined features, including a shallow fin faired into the open cockpit headrest and fixed main monowheel landing gear faired into the engine and oil radiators of the engine. It was entered into the 1933 Coupe Deutsch de la Meurthe air race in which it averaged over 300 km/h (187 mph), on the fifth circuit the engine overheated and the F.370 withdrew from the race.

== Specifications (F.370) ==
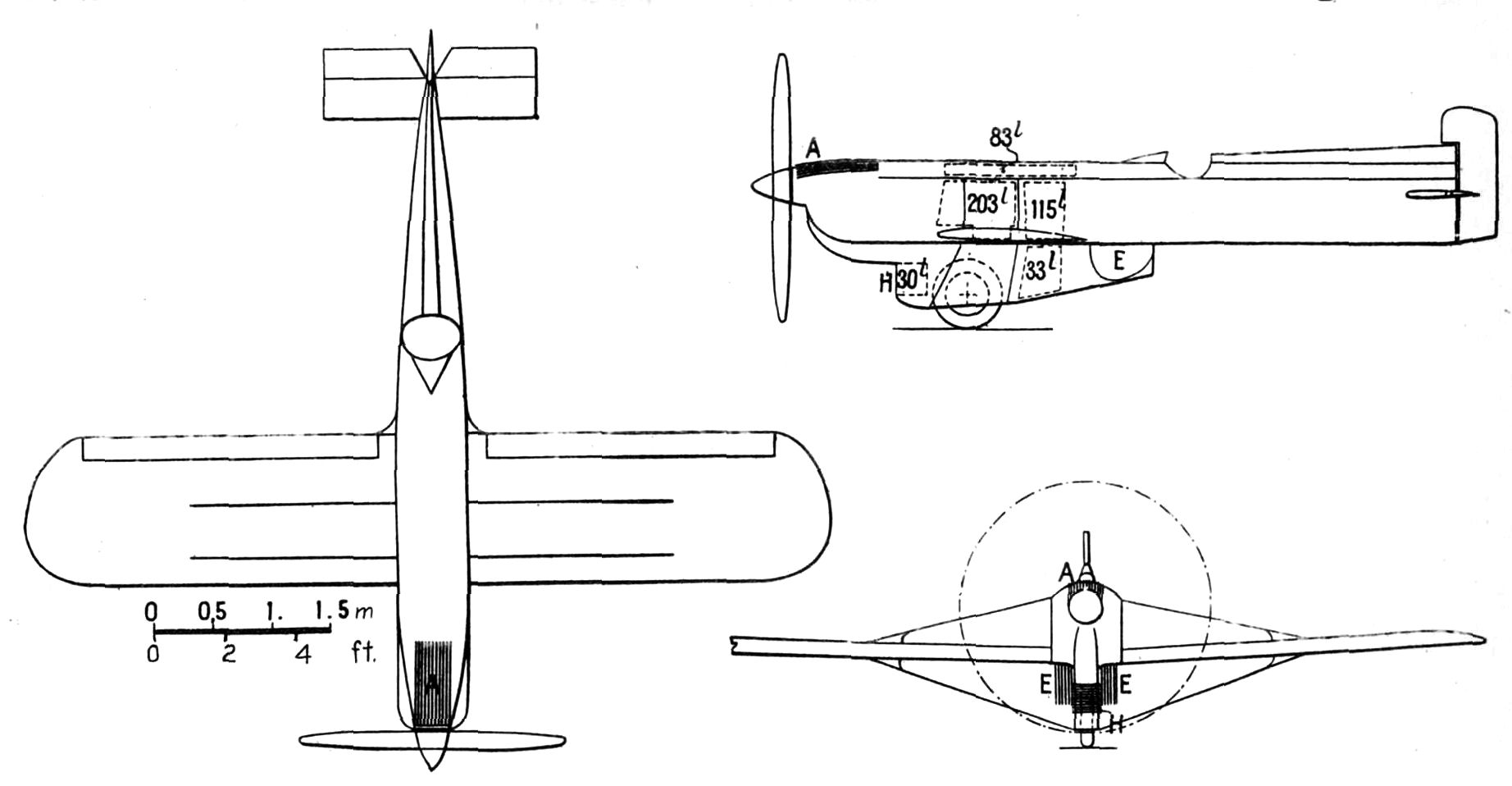
Farman F.370 3-view drawing from NACA-TM-724

Data from

General characteristics

- Crew: 1
- Length: 6.91 m (22 ft 8 in)
- Wingspan: 8.10 m (26 ft 7 in)
- Wing area: 9.50 m^{2} (102.3 sq ft)
- Empty weight: 650 kg (1,433 lb)
- Max takeoff weight: 1,130 kg (2,491 lb)
- Powerplant: 1 × Farman 8 8-cylinder vee piston engine, 300 kW (400 hp)

Performance

- Maximum speed: 330 km/h (210 mph, 180 kn) estimated
