= 1934 in aviation =

This is a list of aviation-related events from 1934:

== Events ==
- Sir Alan Cobham's Flight Refuelling Ltd. develops the looped-hose aerial refueling system, a weighted cable let out of a tanker aircraft and grabbed by a grapnel fired from the receiving aircraft. It is the first practical aerial refueling system, and will not be replaced until the probe-and-drogue system is perfected in 1945.
- At Yokosuka, Japan, the Imperial Japanese Army and Imperial Japanese Navy hold the first of three annual interservice competitions in air combat techniques.
- The Mitsubishi Aircraft Company Ltd. is merged back into its parent company, Mitsubishi Heavy Industries.
- Franco-British Aviation (FBA), which had ceased the design and development of aircraft in 1931 due to a lack of post-World War I civilian orders for its aircraft, sells its workshops to the Bernard Aircraft Company and goes out of business. It had been founded in 1913.

=== January ===
- January 1 – Jean-Pierre Bonnot and Robert Auguste Michel Jeanpierre complete an overnight flight in the Latécoère 300 flying boat Croix-du-Sud begun the previous day from the Étang de Berre in France with their arrival at Saint-Louis, Senegal. The 3,793.200-kilometre (2,356.985-mile) flight sets a world seaplane record for nonstop "distance in a broken line."
- January 10–11 – A flight of six United States Navy Consolidated P2Y flying boats sets a new nonstop straight-line distance record of 2,399 miles (3,861 km), as well as a new nonstop distance record for formation flying, in a flight from San Francisco, and Pearl Harbor, Territory of Hawaii. They also set a new speed record for this crossing of 24 hours 35 minutes, averaging 98 mph (158 km/h). Future Admiral Marc Mitscher pilots one of the aircraft.
- January 15 – On the final leg of a flight that began on 5 January in Saigon, French Indochina – with stops at Karachi, British India; Baghdad, Iraq; Marseille, France; and Lyon, France – the Air France Dewoitine D.332 Emeraude (registration F-AMMY) strikes a hill and crashes in a violent snowstorm at Corbigny, France, while flying from Lyon to Paris–Le Bourget Airport outside Paris, killing all ten people on board. The director of Air France, Maurice Noguès, and the governor-general of French Indochina, Pierre Pasquier, are among the dead. The aircraft is on a proving flight for an Air France route from Paris to Saigon and had left Paris on 21 December 1933 and arrived at Saigon on 28 December 1933 before beginning its return flight, and it crashes only 400 kilometres (249 mi) from its final destination.
- January 24 – A fire levels a storage barn containing seven airplanes at Bellanca Field in New Castle, Delaware. The fire destroys the Wright-Bellanca WB-2 monoplane Miss Columbia, which in 1927 had made the second nonstop transatlantic flight by a fixed-wing aircraft — which also set an unrefueled distance record and was the first transoceanic flight with a passenger — then in 1930 had become the first airplane to make two nonstop transatlantic flights. Retired in 1934 and considered one of the most significant aircraft in aviation history, Miss Columbia had been slated for transfer to the Smithsonian Institution the next day.
- January 30 – Soviet aeronauts Pavel Fedosenko, Andrey Vasenko, and Ilya Usyskin take the hydrogen-filled high-altitude balloon Osoaviakhim-1 on its maiden flight to a record-setting altitude of 72,182 feet (22,001 meters), where it remains for twelve minutes. The 7-hour 14-minute flight – during which the balloon travels 470 kilometers (290 miles)( from its launch site – ends in tragedy when the crew loses control of the balloon during its descent and the gondola disintegrates and crashes near the village of Potizh-Ostrog in Insarsky District of Mordovian Autonomous Oblast in the Soviet Union, killing the crew.

=== February ===
- February 1 – South African Airways is founded.
- February 3 – Deutsche Luft Hansa begins the first regular airmail service across the Atlantic Ocean, between Berlin and Rio de Janeiro.
- February 6 – A new Inter-Departmental Advisory Committee on Aviation meets to study the establishment of a uniform United States Government aviation policy. It consists of representatives of the United States Department of Commerce, United States Department of War, United States Department of the Navy, United States Post Office Department, and Interstate Commerce Commission.
- February 7 – Germany begins a regular air mail service between Africa and South America, employing Dornier flying boats catapulted from depot ships. Dornier Do 26s will later fly the route without the assistance of ships, and various Dornier flying boats will complete over 300 crossings before the outbreak of World War II brings the service to an end in 1939.
- February 9 – At the direction of President Franklin D. Roosevelt, Postmaster General of the United States James Farley cancels all U.S. Air Mail contracts due to alleged improprieties — in what becomes known as the "Air Mail scandal" — by Postmaster General Walter Folger Brown during the Hoover Administration. United States Senate and U.S. Post Office Department investigations have concluded that Brown had bypassed competitive bidding requirements and colluded with large airlines in awarding air mail contracts to them in a series of conferences — derided by critics as "Spoils Conferences" – that had begun in May 1930. Then contract cancellations are to go into effect on February 19.
- February 10 – Noting that the previous day's cancellation of air mail contracts had created an emergency, President Franklin Roosevelt issues an executive order directing United States Secretary of War George Dern to make available whatever United States Army Air Corps planes and pilots were necessary to carry air mail. Army Air Corps chief Major General Benjamin D. Foulois recxeives orders to begin the Army Air Corps's air mail effort in 10 days.
- February 14 – At New Orleans, Louisiana, Steve Wittman, flying the Nicholas-Beazley Pobjoy Special, sets a world speed record for a Category 4 light landplane over a distance of 100 km (62.1 mi), averaging 221.307 km/h (137.514 mph).
- February 17 – Flying the Avro 618 Ten Faith in Australia, Australian aviator Charles Ulm carries the first official air mail from New Zealand to Australia, flying from Auckland to Sydney in 14 hours 10 minutes.
- February 18–19 – The American World War I ace Eddie Rickenbacker and a Transcontinental & Western Air team including Jack Frye, "Tommy" Tomlinson, Larry Fritz, Paul E. Richter, Si Morehouse, Harlan Hull, John Collings, and Andy Andrews sets a new record for a transcontinental flight across the United States, flying the Douglas DC-1 from Burbank, California, to Newark, New Jersey, in 13 hours 4 minutes.
- February 19 – The United States Army Air Corps begins flying U.S. airmail in the wake of President Roosevelt's cancellation of all U.S. Air Mail contracts.
- February 26 – In the first week of U.S. Army Air Corps delivery of U.S. Air Mail, five Army aviators have been killed in accidents. The death rate highlights the lack of training of most U.S. Army pilots in night and bad-weather flying.

=== March ===
- March 7 – Juan de la Cierva lands a Cierva C.30 autogyro on the Spanish Navy seaplane carrier Dédalo in the Mediterranean Sea off Valencia, Spain. It is the first time a rotorcraft lands on the deck of a ship. He achieves another first a half an hour later when he takes off from Dédalo′s deck after a takeoff run of only 24 metres (79 feet), the first time that a rotorcraft takes off from the deck of a ship.
- March 9 – All air operations of the United States Customs Service are transferred to the United States Coast Guard.
- March 10 – President Franklin D. Roosevelt orders the temporary curtailment of air mail service by the United States Army Air Corps. Since February 10, when he issued his order to the Army Air Corps to carry air mail, 10 Army fliers have died in accidents, four of them on the air mail routes themselves and six others in air-mail-related flight training exercises and in flights ferrying personnel for air mail duty.
- March 19 – The U.S. Army Air Corps resumes carrying air mail on reduced schedules.
- March 22
  - The wreckage of the Pan American-Grace Airways (Panagra) Ford 5-AT-C Trimotor San José (registration NC403H) – which had crashed on Chile's Cerro El Plomo in the Andes Mountains during a severe snowstorm on 16 July 1932, killing all nine people on board, and subsequently been buried in ice and snow – finally is discovered.
  - The Panagra Ford 5-AT-C Trimotor NC407H suffers engine failure and crashes on takeoff at Lima-Callao International Airport at Lima, Peru, killing three of the 15 people on board.
- March 30 – In France, Raymond Delmotte, flying a Caudron C.430 Rafale monoplane, sets a world speed record for a Category 1 light landplane over a distance of 100 km (62.1 mi), averaging 292.018 km/h (181.452 mph).

=== April ===
- Six Soviet and two American airmen rescue the crew of the Soviet commercial icebreaker Chelyuskin from the ice of the Chukchi Sea, where the ship had sunk on February 13.
- April 1 – Flying a Sikorsky S-42 flying boat, Pan American Airways chief pilot Edwin Musick, Sikorsky test pilot Boris Sergievsky, and technical advisor Charles Lindbergh set eight world seaplane records in a single flight. They average 253.601 km/h (157.580 mph) over a closed-circuit distance of 1,000 km (621.4 mi), setting seaplane records for speed over that distance and for speed with a 500 kg (1,102 lb) payload, with a 1,000 kg (2,205 lb) payload, and with a 2,000 kg (4,409 lb) payload over that distance in a closed circuit. They also average 253.18 km/h (157.319 mph) over a closed-circuit distance of 2,000 km (1,242.7 mi), setting seaplane records for speed over that distance and for speed with a 500 kg (1,102 lb) payload, with a 1,000 kg (2,205 lb) payload, and with a 2,000 kg (4,409 lb) payload over that distance in a closed circuit.
- April 11
  - On his eighteenth attempt to break the world altitude record, Renato Donati of the Italian Regia Aeronautica (Royal Air Force) sets a new record of 14,432.956 metres (47,352.219 feet) in a Caproni Ca 113.
  - American Airways changes its name to American Airlines.
- April 11–12 – Piloting the Avro 618 Ten Faith in Australia, Australian aviator Charles Ulm carries the first official air mail from Australia to New Zealand, flying from Richmond, New South Wales, to New Plymouth in 16 hours 46 minutes. He had flown the first air mail in the opposite direction in February.
- April 15 – In the United States, airport development with United States Government aid is transferred to the Federal Emergency Relief Administration, which is to complete projects started under the Civil Works Administration.
- April 16 – Northwest Airways changes its name to Northwest Airlines.
- April 17 – As a result of the large number of United States Army Air Corps flying accidents while carrying air mail in 1934, United States Secretary of War George Dern appointed the Baker Committee — named for its chairman, former Secretary of War Newton D. Baker, and composed of six civilian and five military members — to report on "the operation of the Army Air Corps and the adequacy and efficiency of its technical flying equipment and training for the performance of its mission in peace and in war." The committee is directed to include in its report a study of the proper relationship between the United States Army and civil aviation.
- April 26 – Flying a Sikorsky S-42 flying boat, Sikorsky test pilot Boris Sergievsky and copilot Raymond B. Quick set a world seaplane record for the greatest payload carried to 2,000 meters (6,562 ft), reaching that altitude with a load of 7,533 kg (16,607 lb).

=== May ===
- May 1 – During United States Navy tests of an instrument flying system, Lieutenant Frank Peak Akers takes off from Naval Air Station Anacostia in Washington, D.C., in a Berliner-Joyce OJ-2 with a hooded cockpit and flies "blind" to College Park, Maryland.
- May 2 – In France, Raymond Delmotte, flying a Caudron C.362 monoplane, sets a world speed record for a Category 2 light landplane over a distance of 100 km (62.1 mi), averaging 345.622 km/h (214.760 mph).
- May 7 – During the 78 days in which the United States Army Air Corps has carried air mail, 12 Army Air Corps aviators have died in 66 accidents. The losses convince United States Army officials of the need to train their pilots in flying at night and in bad weather.
- May 8 – The U.S. Army Air Corps begins to turn over the responsibility for carrying air mail to commercial air carriers.
- May 8–23 – Jean Batten sets a new women's speed record between England and Australia. She flies a de Havilland DH.60 and makes the trip in 14 days 22 hours.
- May 9 – An Air France Wibault 282T-12 airliner crashes into the English Channel off Dungeness, Kent, England, killing all six people on board.
- May 10 – In the United States, the National Labor Board issues a decision which, among other things, sets a maximum flying time of 85 hours per month for airline pilots. The decision does not have the force of law.
- May 12 – Piloting a Savoia-Marchetti S.72 over Italy, N. di Maura and G. Olivari set a world altitude record for a landplane with a 2,000 kg (4,409 lb) useful load, climbing to 8,438 metres (27,684 feet).
- May 14 – Flying a Sikorsky S-42 flying boat, Sikorsky test pilot Boris Sergievsky and copilot Raymond B. Quick set a world seaplane record for altitude with a payload of 5,000 kg (11,023 lb), climbing to 6,220 meters (20,407 ft).
- May 18 – The Douglas DC-2 – the production version of the Douglas DC-1 and forerunner of the Douglas DC-3 – enters commercial service, flying for Transcontinental and Western Air on the Columbus, Ohio–Pittsburgh, Pennsylvania–Newark, New Jersey route.
- May 19 – In the Soviet Union, the largest heavier-than-air aircraft built anywhere in the 1930s, the Andrei Tupolev-designed ANT-20 Maksim Gorki, makes its first flight. It has a wingspan of 63 metres (207 feet) and a takeoff weight of 42 tonnes (41 long tons; 46 short tons).
- May 24 – Piloting a Caudron C.450 monoplane in France, Raymond Delmotte sets a world speed record for a flight over a distance of 100 km (62.1 mi), averaging 431.654 km/h (268.217 mph).
- May 28 – French Couzinet 71 flying boats begin the first regular air mail service across the South Atlantic Ocean.
- May 29 – Highland Airways commences the first regular airmail service within the United Kingdom, between Inverness and Kirkwall

=== June ===
- June 1 – The United States Army Air Corps flies its last air mail flight — from Chicago, Illinois, to Fargo, North Dakota — as commercial air carriers resume carrying air mail under new contracts along all routes.
- June 4 – The United States Navy commissions its first purpose-built aircraft carrier, USS Ranger (CV-4).
- June 8 – A professional baseball team travels by air for the first time, when the Cincinnati Reds of the National League fly in a chartered Douglas DC-2 from Cincinnati to Chicago to play the Chicago Cubs.
- June 9 – Flying in fog and thunderstorms during a scheduled flight from Newark Metropolitan Airport in Newark, New Jersey, to Chicago, the American Airways Curtiss T-32 Condor II NC12354 crashes into Last Chance Hill in the Catskill Mountains in New York at an altitude of 2,000 feet (610 meters), killing all seven people on board.
- June 11 – During a flight from Santiago, Chile, to Buenos Aires, Argentina, the Pan American-Grace Airways (Panagra) Ford 5-AT-C Trimotor NC8417 crashes into Argentina's Mar Chiquita Lake during a heavy rainstorm, killing six of the ten people on board.
- June 12 – In the United States, President Franklin D. Roosevelt signs into law the Air Mail Act of 1934, a response to the "Air Mail scandal" which closely regulates the contracting of air mail services and prohibits aircraft manufacturers from owning airlines. It prescribes the responsibilities and powers of the Postmaster General of the United States in issuing air mail contracts and the powers of the Postmaster General and (for the first time in aviation affairs) the Interstate Commerce Commission in monitoring the performance and accounting practices of contractors, makes the Interstate Comnmerce Commission responsible for setting compensation rates for air mail contractors, prohibits contractors from employing in a managerial capacity anyone previously involved in unlawful efforts to avoid competitive bidding processes, and requires contractors to reveal the identities and financial stakes of large stockholders. It assigns responsibilities to the United States Secretary of Commerce regarding the speed, load capacity, and safety features of equipment to be used on each air mail route and in regulating the hours and benefits of pilots and mechanics, and it gives the National Labor Board's May decision limiting pilot flying hours to 85 hours per month the force of law for air mail pilots. It authorizes the President of the United States to appoint a five-member commission (the Federal Aviation Commission) "for the purpose of making an immediate study and survey and to report to Congress not later than February 1, 1935, its recommendations of a broad policy covering all phases of aviation and the relation of the United States thereto." Its prohibition of aircraft manufacturers owning airlines and vice versa will become effective on January 1, 1935.
- June 16 – Piloting a Farman F.221 over France, Lucien Coupet sets a world altitude record for a landplane with a 5,000 kg (11,023 lb) useful load, climbing to 3,231 metres (10,600 feet).
- June 19 – An amendment to the Air Commerce Act of 1926 gives the United States Department of Commerce's Aeronautics Branch (the predecessor of the Federal Aviation Administration) stronger authority to investigate civil aviation accidents, empowering the United States Secretary of Commerce or his representative to subpoena witnesses to testify or produce documentary evidence at public hearings into the causes of such accidents. If the accident involved a fatality or serious injury, the amendment requires the Secretary of Commerce to issue a statement of the accident's probable cause. The amendment also gives the Secretary of Commerce additional aviation-safety rulemaking powers.
- June 23 – The U.S. Army takes delivery of its first six Link Trainers, giving birth to the flight simulator industry.
- June 24 – Airplane designer and racer Jimmie Wedell and his passenger die when the de Havilland Gypsy Moth he is piloting crashes at Patterson, Louisiana.
- June 26 – The initial flight of the Focke-Wulf Fw 61, the first practical helicopter, takes place.
- June 29–30 – Brothers Benjamin and Joseph Adamowicz, amateur pilots, fly across the Atlantic Ocean.

=== July ===
- July 1 – The United States Department of Commerce's Aeronautics Branch is renamed the Bureau of Air Commerce. It is the ancestor of the Federal Aviation Administration.
- July 2
  - Flying the Avro 618 Ten Faith in Australia, Australian aviator Charles Ulm begins the first official air mail flight from New Zealand and Australia to New Guinea. On the first leg, he flies in just under 16 1/2 hours from New Zealand to Mascot in New South Wales, where he remains until 24 July.
  - The Armée de l'Air is separated from the French Army to become the independent French Air Force, although retaining the name Armée de l'Air.
- July 8 – Piloting the Caudron C.530 Rafale F-ANAO, Hélène Boucher sets the "Light aircraft (Category 1)" speed record for distances over 1,000 km (621 mi), averaging 250.086 km/h (155.396 mph).
- July 11
  - Engelbert Zaschka of Germany flies his large human-powered aircraft, the Zaschka Human-Power Aircraft, about 20 meters (66 feet) at Berlin Tempelhof Airport without assisted take off.
  - The U.S. Federal Aviation Commission, appointed by President Franklin D. Roosevelt in accordance with the Air Mail Act of 1934, holds its first meeting. The members include Clark Howell, Edward P. Warner, and Jerome C. Hunsaker. The commission receives an assignment to make "an immediate study and survey" and to recommend "a broad policy covering all phases of aviation and the relation of the United States thereto."
- July 15 – The Southwest Division of Varney Speed Lines begins passenger operations, flying an air mail route between Pueblo, Colorado, and El Paso, Texas. It later will become Continental Airlines.
- July 18 – Concluding its investigation of the high accident rate the United States Army Air Corps experienced while transporting air mail in 1934, the Baker Committee files its report. It finds that the aviation industry is vital to the national defense of the United States and that the United States surpasses other countries in general, commercial, and naval aviation, but also that the Army Air Corps is deficient in armament, equipment, and munitions due to a lack of funds. It recommends that the United States Government refrain from competition with the private aviation industry, that U.S. Government purchase of aircraft by design competition and by negotiation — rather than only by open competitive bids — be made lawful, that the Army Air Corps take steps to keep abreast of and adopt the latest equipment and methods, that Army Air Corps cargo and transport planes be converted or developed from commercial types, and that Army Air Corps pilots receive training to use U.S. national airways.
- July 19
  - F9C Sparrowhawk parasite fighters from the United States Navy airship USS Macon successfully launch from the airship, scout out the heavy cruiser USS Houston (CA-30), and return to Macon.
  - The U.S. Department of Commerce's Bureau of Air Commerce announces the creation of a Development Section to conduct and promote work on new types of aircraft, engines, and accessories, with specialization in the development of a low-priced airplane for general public use.
- July 19-August 20 – United States Army Air Corps General Henry Arnold leads ten Martin B-10 bombers on an 8,000-mile (12,882-km) proving flight.
- July 24 – Charles Ulm resumes the first air mail flight from New Zealand and Australia to New Guinea, piloting the Avro 618 Ten Faith in Australia from Mascot, New South Wales, to Cairns in Queensland, Australia. The flight segment also begins the first round-trip airmail flight between Australia and New Guinea.
- July 26
  - Piloting the Avro 618 Ten Faith in Australia, Charles Ulm flies the next leg of the first air mail flight from New Zealand and Australia to New Guinea, a 550-mile (478 nmi; 885 km) leg from Cairns to Port Moresby in the Territory of Papua. The flight segment also resumes the first round-trip air mail flight between Australia and New Guinea.
  - United States Army Air Corps Major William E. Kepner, Captain Albert W. Stevens, and Captain Orvil A. Anderson make the "National Geographic Society–U.S. Army Air Corps Stratosphere Flight" in the balloon Explorer in an attempt to set a new world altitude record for human flight. Launching from a depression that becomes known as the "Stratobowl" in Moonlight Valley in the Black Hills near Rapid City, South Dakota, they reach 60,616 feet (18,476 meters) – about 12,000 feet (3,700 meters) short of the record – before a tear in the balloon forces them to descend over central Nebraska. Eventually, half the gas bag tears away, and they decide to bail out as the balloon passes 4,000 feet (1,200 meters) in a dangerously rapid descent. All three men parachute to safety, the last of them exiting the gondola at an altitude of only about 500 feet (150 meters), before the gondola crashes.
- July 27
  - Charles Ulm pilots the Avro 618 Ten Faith in Australia from Port Moresby to Lae in the Territory of Papua, completing both the first air mail flight from New Zealand and Australia to New Guinea and the outbound portion of the first round-trip air mail flight between Australia and New Guinea.
  - During a flight from Zurich-Dübendorf Airport in Switzerland to Stuttgart Airport in Stuttgart, Germany, the Swissair Curtiss T-32 Condor II CH-170 encounters severe turbulence and loses a wing in flight at an altitude of 3,000 meters (9,800 feet). It crashes in a forest near Wurmlingen in Tuttlingen, Germany, and burns, killing all 12 people on board, including the first European female flight attendant Nelly Diener. It is the deadliest civil aviation accident of 1934.
- July 30 – Piloting the Avro 618 Ten Faith in Australia, Charles Ulm begins the first air mail flight from New Guinea to Australia, taking off from Lae in the Territory of Papua bound for an overnight stop in Cairns, Queensland. It also is the next leg of the first round-trip air mail flight between Australia to New Guinea.

=== August ===
- The first National Air Meet for Women takes place at Dayton, Ohio. During a 50-mile (80 km) individual race, aviation record-holder Frances Marsalis dies in a crash at the age of 29.
- The Italian Fascist government merges the airlines Società Aerea Mediterranea (SAM), Società Anonima Navigazione Aerea (SANA), Società Italiana Servizi Aerei (SISA), and Aero Espresso Italiana (AEI) to create the new airline Ala Littoria as the national airline of Italy.
- August 1 – After leaving Lae in the Territory of Papua on July 30 in the Avro 618 Ten Faith in Australia bound for Australia and making an overnight stop at Cairns and stops at Rockhampton, Townsville, and Brisbane, Australian aviator Charles Ulm arrives at Sydney, completing both the first air mail flight from New Guinea to Australia and the first round-trip air mail flight between Australia and New Guinea.
- August 8 – Flying a Caudron C.450, Hélène Boucher sets two international speed records, averaging 409.184 km/h (254.255 mph) over a distance of 1,000 km (621 mi) (also recognized as the women's record over this distance), and averaging 412.371 km/h (256.235 mph) over a distance of 100 km (62.1 mi).
- August 8–9 – James Ayling and Len Reid make the first non-stop flight from Canada to England, in a de Havilland DH84, taking 30 hours 50 minutes for the flight.
- August 10 – The Lockheed Model 10 Electra receives its type certificate from the United States Department of Commerce's Aeronautics Branch (the predecessor of the Federal Aviation Administration).
- August 11 – Flying a Caudron C.450, Hélène Boucher sets a woman's speed record of 445.028 km/h (276.528 mph).
- August 18 – At Istres, France, French Air Force Captain Jacques Puget and Lieutenant Jean-Julien Moulignat, flying a Caudron C.430 Rafale monoplane, set a world speed record for a Category 1 light landplane over a distance of 1,000 km (621 mi), completing the flight in 3 hours 35 minutes 2 seconds at an average speed of 279.018 km/h (173.374 mph).
- August 27 – At Wright Field outside Dayton, Ohio, Wiley Post becomes the first person in the United States to undergo flight pressure suit tests in an altitude chamber. He undergoes a second test the next day.
- August 28–September 16 – The fourth and last International Tourist Aircraft Contest Challenge International de Tourisme 1934 takes place in Warsaw, Poland. The Polish crew of Jerzy Bajan wins in the RWD-9.

=== September ===
- Australian aviator Charles Ulm founds Great Pacific Airways, with which he plans to establish a San Francisco-to-Sydney air service.
- September 5
  - While undergoing inflation with hydrogen gas in Moscow's Kuntsevo District for a planned September 24 ascent to set a new human fight altitude record, the Soviet balloon USSR-2 is destroyed by a fire ignited by a stray spark. The accident prompts the Soviet Union's People's Commissar of Defense, Kliment Voroshilov, to suspend the Soviet Union's high-altitude manned balloon program.
  - Wiley Post becomes the first person to use a successful pressure suit in flight, climbing to 40,000 feet (12,200 m) above Chicago, Illinois, in the Lockheed 5C Vega Winnie Mae. The flight, which is part of the program at the Chicago World's Fair, sets an unofficial altitude record for heavier-than-air aircraft.
- September 7–16 – As part of Challenge International de Tourisme 1934, a 9,537 km (5,926 mi) race takes place over Europe and North Africa, concluding with a maximum speed trial over a 297 km (185 mi) triangular course on September 16.
- September 13 – Following a conclusive demonstration of a United States Army Air Corps blind-landing system, the United States Department of Commerce's Bureau of Air Commerce adopts it as its standard system, marking the conclusion of an eleven-month effort in which it used a Ford Trimotor to test various systems and modifications for blind landings.
- September 14 – The airline Aeronaves de México begins flight operations. Its first flight is from Mexico City to Acapulco, Mexico, using a Stinson SR Reliant. The airline will change its name to Aeroméxico in February 1972.
- September 22
  - Sir Alan Cobham sets out in an Airspeed Courier in a failed attempt to fly non-stop from England to India.
  - Shortly after takeoff from Heston Airport in Hounslow, England, the Handley Page W.10 airliner G-EBMM, operated by National Aviation Displays, suffers a structural failure and crashes at Aston Clinton, killing all four people on board.
- September 29 – A London, Scottish & Provincial Airways Airspeed Courier crashes at Timberden Bottom, Shoreham, Kent, in the United Kingdom, killing all four people on board. Flying debris injures two people on the ground.

=== October ===
- The Japan Aeroplane Company Ltd. is founded, with plants at Yokohama and Yamagata, Japan.
- The Government of the Philippines passes an act to regulate foreign aircraft operations in the Philippines and to require a franchise from the Philippine government in order to operate an air service in the Philippines.
- October 1 – New safety regulations for airlines go into effect in the United States. They include a requirement for airline pilots to use multi-engine aircraft capable of operating with one engine not functioning when flying at night or over terrain not readily permitting emergency landings, permit instrument ("blind") flying only by multi-engine airliners equipped with two-way radio, and require every airline to set up its route system in operating divisions with a Bureau of Air Commerce-approved operating manual for each division prescribing minimum altitudes of flight over specific airways, the minimum ceiling for landing at specific airports, procedures for takeoff in the event of a forced landing, and weather minimums for specific routes. They also change flight-duty limitations for airline pilots, decreasing the permitted monthly maximum from 110 to 100 hours — higher than the legally mandated limit of 85 hours for pilots transporting air mail — and require that airline dispatching procedures and personnel receive Department of Commerce approval.
- October 2 – A Hillman's Airways de Havilland DH.89A Dragon Rapide crashes into the English Channel off Folkestone, Kent, England, in poor visibility, killing all seven people on board.
- October 8 – Inter-Island Airways makes the first interisland air mail flight in the Hawaiian Islands under a United States Post Office contract.
- October 14 – National Airlines begins operations, using two second-hand Ryan ST monoplanes to fly a mail contract service in Florida between St. Petersburg and Daytona Beach with stops at Tampa, Lakeland, and Orlando.
- October 19 – The Holyman's Airways de Havilland DH.86 Express airliner Miss Hobart (registration VH-URN) crashes in the Bass Strait during a domestic flight in Australia from Melbourne, Victoria, to Launceston, Tasmania, killing all 11 people on board. Miss Hobart had just flown the new airline's first flight three weeks earlier, and one of its founders, Captain Victor Holyman, is among the dead.
- October 20-November 3 - Sir Charles Kingsford Smith makes the first eastward crossing of the Pacific Ocean, from Brisbane, Australia to San Francisco, in the Lockheed Altair Lady Southern Cross. The Hawaii-to-San Francisco leg of his crossing on November 3 is the first eastward flight from Hawaii to North America.
- October 20-November 5 - The MacRobertson Air Race is flown from England to Melbourne, Australia to celebrate the centenary of the state of Victoria. The £10,000 prize money is won by C. W. A. Scott and Tom Campbell Black flying de Havilland DH.88 Comet Grosvenor House from Mildenhall, Suffolk to Melbourne, Australia in a time of 71 hours.
- October 23
  - Francesco Agello passes his 1933 world speed with a new airspeed record of 709.202 km/h (440.678 mph). Again he flies the Italian Macchi M.C.72 seaplane.
  - Husband and wife Jean and Jeannette Piccard ascend to an altitude of 57,579 feet (17,550 meters) over Lake Erie in the balloon A Century of Progress. The first licensed female balloon pilot in the United States, Jeannette Piccard retains control of the balloon for the entire flight, and the flight makes her the first woman to fly in the stratosphere.
- October 26 – The only Pander S-4 Postjager is destroyed during the MacRobertson Air Race from London, England, to Melbourne, Australia, when it strikes a motor car and bursts into flames while taxiing for departure from Allahabad, India. Its crew escapes unharmed.

=== November ===
- The United States Congress passes an amendment to the Air Commerce Act of 1926 requiring U.S. airlines to use multi-engine aircraft on routes over terrain not readily permitting emergency landings.
- November 5 – Piloting a Curtiss A-12 Shrike while practicing night landings on an unlighted airstrip at Fort Crockett in Galveston, Texas, pioneer United States Army Air Corps airpower advocate Lieutenant Colonel Horace Meek Hickam dies when his plane strikes an embankment and flips over. The future Hickam Field (later Hickam Air Force Base) will be named for him.
- November 6 – The Deutsche Reichsbahn-Gesellschaft Junkers Ju 52/3mge D-AVAN, flying a domestic cargo flight in Germany from Königsberg Devau Airport in Königsberg, East Prussia, to Berlin Tempelhof Airport in Berlin, crashes while attempting an emergency landing at Gross-Rackitt in Pommern, killing all five people on board.
- November 15 – During a domestic flight in Australia from Longreach Airport, Queensland, to Archerfield Airport in Archerfield, Queensland – the final leg of its delivery flight from England to Australia – the Qantas de Havilland DH.86 Express VH-USG suffers an in-flight loss of control and crashes at Ilfracombe, killing all four people on board.
- November 30 – The record-setting French aviator Hélène Boucher dies when the Renault Viva Grand Sport she is piloting on a test flight crashes into the woods at Guyancourt, France.

=== December ===
- Pan American Airways (the future Pan American World Airways) announces a decision to build four Sikorsky S-43 transoceanic Clipper amphibians at a cost of $1 million. The airline plans to use them for experimental air transport flights to speed up its inauguration of its proposed transpacific California-Honolulu-Manila-China route.
- December 3
  - In the Lockheed 5C Vega Winnie Mae, Wiley Post takes off from Bartlesville, Oklahoma, and climbs into the stratosphere, where he spends two hours, flying as far east as Fort Smith, Arkansas, before turning back toward Oklahoma. He runs low on fuel due to a headwind, and an fault in his oxygen system forces him to land 80 miles (129 km) southeast of Bartlesville at Hatbox Field in Muskogee, Oklahoma. He reports that he reached 48,000 feet (14,630 m) during the flight.
  - While Australian aviator Charles Ulm and his two-man crew are flying from Oakland, California, to Hawaii in the Airspeed Envoy Stella Australis (VH-UXY) to test the San Francisco-to-Sydney route Ulm plans to establish for his company Great Pacific Airways, they send a series of messages in Morse code to Hawaii over the course of five hours reporting that they are lost, running low on fuel, and must ditch in the sea. They then disappear without trace near Hawaii.
- December 7
  - The crash of a military Fairey Fox fighter-bomber starts a hangar fire at Haren Airport in Brussels, Belgium, that destroys at least two Sabena airliners.
  - Wiley Post makes a flight of 2 hours 26 minutes from Bartlesville in the Winnie Mae, and again climbs into the stratosphere, where he notes a wind blowing at 200 mph (322 km/h), an external temperature of −70 °F (−57 °C), and that he can see Oklahoma City 110 miles (177 km) to the southwest and El Reno, Oklahoma, 150 miles (241 km) to the west. His altimeter breaks at 35,000 feet (10,668 m), but the press reports that he has set an unofficial world altitude record of over 50,000 feet (15,200 m). During the flight he becomes the first person to experience the jet stream directly, and therefore sometimes is described as the discoverer of the jet stream.
- December 8 – Imperial Airways extends its airmail service to Australia.
- December 10 – During a domestic flight in Cuba from Rancho-Boyeros Airport in Havana to Antonio Maceo Airport in Santiago de Cuba, the Cubana de Aviación Ford 4-AT-E Tri-Motor NM-7 crashes into a mountain near Palma Soriano during heavy rain, killing four of the eight people on board.
- December 14 Nearly 100 United States Army Air Corps and United States Navy planes drop flower leis into the Pacific Ocean off Diamond Head, Hawaii, in remembrance of Charles Ulm and his two crewmen, presumed dead after disappearing at sea near Hawaii eleven days earlier.
- December 20
  - During a flight from Almaza Airport outside Cairo, Egypt, to Baghdad, Iraq – one leg of a Christmas mail-and-passenger flight from Schiphol Airport in Amsterdam, the Netherlands, to Batavia in the Netherlands East Indies which prior to Cairo had made stops in Marseille, France; Rome, Italy; and Athens, Greece – the KLM Royal Dutch Airlines Douglas DC-2-115A Uiver (registration PH-AJU) crashes near Rutbah Wells, Iraq, during a rainstorm and bursts into flames, killing all seven people on board.
  - United States Coast Guard Lieutenant Richard L. Burke sets a world seaplane speed record of 308.750 km/h (191.848 mph) over a 3-kilometer (1.8-statute mile) test course flying a Grumman JF-2 Duck.
  - United Airlines Flight 6, a Boeing 247, loses power in both engines shortly after takeoff from Chicago. The three-man crew manages to crash-land the plane, and the entire crew and the lone passenger survive.
- December 25 – Piloting a Caudron monoplane in France, Raymond Delmotte sets a world landplane speed record, reaching 505.84 km/h (314.31 mph)
- December 28 – During the Chaco War, a Macchi M.18 flying boat of the Paraguayan Navy's aviation arm carries out the first night bombing raid in South America, attacking Bolivian positions at Vitriones and Mbutum.
- c. December 29 – An American Airlines Curtiss T-32 Condor II crashes in the Adirondack Mountains; all four on board survive.
- December 31 – Helen Richey becomes the first woman to pilot a regular civil flight, taking a Central Airlines Ford Trimotor on the Washington, D.C.-to-Detroit, Michigan, route; however, she gets few subsequent flights.

== First flights ==
- Aichi D1A
- Avro 641 Commodore
- Avro 642 Eighteen
- Bellanca 77-140
- Farman F.271
- Farman F.400
- Farman F.430
- Granville Gee Bee R-6
- Miles Hawk Major
- Nakajima Ki-8
- Nakajima Ki-11
- Piaggio P.16
- Westland F.7/30/PV.4
- Early 1934 – Arado Ar 68
- Summer 1934 – Henschel Hs 125

=== January ===
- January 4 – Henschel Hs 121
- January 7 – Curtiss XF13C-1
- January 14 – de Havilland DH.86 Express
- January 16 – Northrop XFT-1
- January 20 – Boeing XP-940/P-29
- January 23 – Berliner-Joyce XF3J-1
- January 30 – Junkers Ju 160

=== February ===
- Gotha Go 145
- Kawasaki Ki-5
- February 19 – Supermarine Type 224
- February 22 – Fairey S.9/30
- February 23 – Lockheed Model 10 Electra

=== March ===
- Nakajima E8N
- Saro London
- March 30 - Potez 58
- March 30 - Sikorsky S-42

=== April ===
- Curtiss SOC
- Mitsubishi Ka-9, forerunner of the Ka-15 prototype for the Mitsubishi G3M (Allied reporting name "Nell")
- April 17
  - de Havilland DH.89 Dragon Rapide
  - Fairey Swordfish
- April 27 – Stinson Model A
- April 28 – Hamburger Flugzeugbau Ha 135

=== May ===
- Nakajima Ki-4
- May 9 - de Havilland DH.87 Hornet Moth
- May 11 - Douglas DC-2
- May 19 - Tupolev ANT-20 Maksim Gorky

=== June ===
- June 12
  - Bristol Type 123
- June 18
  - Farman F.420
  - Potez 56
- June 26 – Airspeed Envoy

=== July ===
- July 27 - Supermarine Stranraer

=== August ===
- Mitsubishi B4M
- PZL.23 Karas
- August 1 - Amiot 143
- August 14 - Dewoitine D.510

=== September ===
- September 1
  - Bellanca 28-70
  - Polikarpov I-17
- September 7 – Hawker Hardy
- September 8 – de Havilland DH.88 Comet
- September 12
  - Gloster Gladiator
  - Hawker Hind
- September 28 – Savoia-Marchetti SM.79 Sparviero

=== October ===
- Caudron Simoun C620
- October 7 - Tupolev ANT-40RT, forerunner to the Tupolev SB
- October 12 – Miles M.3 Falcon
- October 15 - Grumman XF3F-1
- October 31 – Fairchild Super 71

=== November ===
- November 4 – Junkers Ju 86
- November 16 – Savoia-Marchetti S.74
- November 23
  - Bloch MB.210
  - Dornier Do 17

=== December ===
- Aichi E10A
- December 12 - Aero A.101
- December 30 - Martin M-130

== Entered service ==
- Avro 671 Rota with the Royal Air Force
- Beriev MBR-2 with Soviet Naval Aviation (NATO reporting name "Mote")
- Beriev MP-1 in airliner service
- Cierva C.30
- Latécoère 290 with two squadrons of French Naval Aviation
- Polikarpov I-15 with the Soviet Air Force
- Potez 39 with the French Air Force
- PZL P.11a with the Polish Air Force
- PZL P.11b with the Romanian Air Force

=== January ===
- Consolidated P-30 (later PB-2) with the United States Army Air Corps

=== April ===
- April 6 – Avro 642 Eighteen with Midland & Scottish Air Ferries Ltd

=== May ===
- Couzinet 71 with Aéropostale
- Grumman JF Duck with the United States Navy at Naval Air Station Norfolk, Virginia
- Polikarpov I-16 with the Soviet Air Force
- May 18 – Douglas DC-2 with Transcontinental and Western Air
- May 24 – Avro 641 Commodore with private owner

=== August ===
- August 11 – Lockheed Model 10 Electra (scheduled airline service)

=== November ===
- November 25 – Potez 540 with the French Air Force

== Retirements ==
- Avro 654, formerly the Avro 627 Mailplane
- Boeing 80 by United Airlines

=== January ===
- Handley Page Hyderabad by the Royal Air Force's No. 503 Squadron

=== December ===
- Cierva C.24
