= 1933 Imperial Airways crash =

The 1933 Imperial Airways crash may refer to

- 1933 Imperial Airways Dixmude crash in which Armstrong Whitwort Argosy G-AACI crashed with the loss of 15 lives.
- 1933 Imperial Airways Ruysselede crash in which Avro Ten G-ABLU crashed with the loss of 10 lives.
