= City of Liverpool =

City of Liverpool or Liverpool City may refer to:

== Places ==
- Liverpool, a city in Merseyside, United Kingdom formerly in Lancashire
- Liverpool, New South Wales, a suburb of Sydney, Australia

== Politics ==
- City of Liverpool (New South Wales), a local government area in Sydney, Australia, including the suburb
- Liverpool City Council, the governing body for the city of Liverpool, England

== Sports ==
- Liverpool City (1906), a defunct rugby league team based in Liverpool that played from 1906 to 1907
- Liverpool City RLFC, defunct rugby team playing from 1951 to 1968, previously known as Liverpool Stanley and renamed Huyton RLFC
- City of Liverpool (water polo), British water polo club, see Team GB women's water polo team
- City of Liverpool F.C., an association football club founded in 2015

== Other ==
- City of Liverpool (aircraft), the aircraft downed in the 1933 Imperial Airways Diksmuide crash
