= 1931 Avro Ten Southern Cloud disappearance =

Aircraft disappearance

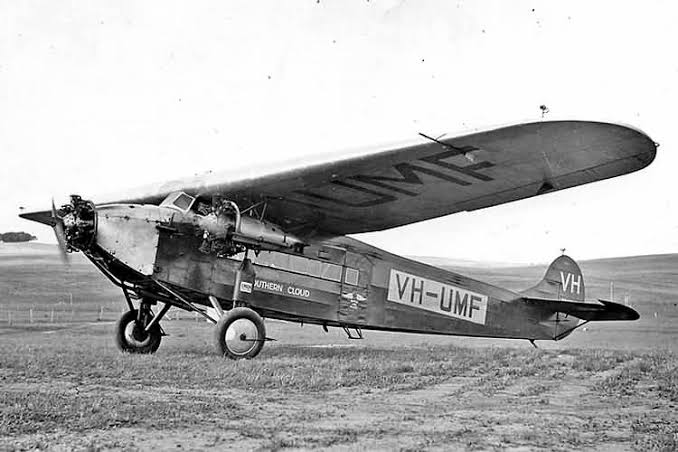
- VH-UMF, the Avro 618 Ten involved in the disappearance

Accident
- Date: 21 March 1931
- Summary: Severe weather
- Site: Snowy Mountains, New South Wales, Australia; 35°59.967′S 148°19.775′E

Aircraft
- Aircraft type: Avro 618 Ten (license-built Fokker F-VIIB/3m)
- Operator: Australian National Airways
- Registration: VH-UMF
- Passengers: 6
- Crew: 2
- Fatalities: 8
- Injuries: 0
- Survivors: 0

The Southern Cloud, registered VH-UMF, was one of five Avro 618 Ten three-engined aircraft flying daily airline services between Australian cities for Australian National Airways in the early 1930s.

== Disappearance ==
On 21 March 1931, the Southern Cloud departed at 8:10 AM from Sydney for Melbourne. On board were six passengers and two crew, including pilot Travis "Shorty" Shortridge and assistant pilot C.T. Dunell. Weather conditions en route were hazardous and much worse than predicted. The aircraft never reached its destination and disappeared.

The search for the missing aircraft lasted 18 days and involved over 20 aircraft. No trace of the missing aircraft was found. Airline co-owner Charles Kingsford Smith joined the search and "may have flown over the crash site, but with the aircraft having burned it would be very difficult to distinguish from the air and so the discovery wasn't made."

It was Australia's first major airline disaster. Australian National Airways folded later that year as a result of both this and another loss. A film inspired by the accident, The Secret of the Skies, was released in 1934.

== Passengers ==
Six passengers departed Sydney in the Southern Cloud on 21 March 1931:

- Mr W. O'Reilly, 229 Castlereagh Street, Sydney.
- Miss C. Stokes, O'Sullivan Road, Rose Bay,
- Mr. Clyde Hood, Onslow Gardens, Greenknowe Avenue, Darlinghurst. A producer for Union Theatres flying to Melbourne to join his wife (stage name Miss Bertha Riccardo).
- Mr H. O'Farrell, 50 Gardenvale Road, Caulfield, Victoria.
- Mr. Margules, of Margules and Hickman, Lonsdale Street, Melbourne, who flew from Brisbane the week prior.
- Miss E. Glasgow, who had booked her travel with Thomas Cook and Sons.

== Investigation and 1958 rediscovery ==
The Southern Cloud's fate remained a mystery for 27 years until 26 October 1958. On that day, Thomas Sonter, a carpenter from New Zealand employed on the Snowy Mountains Scheme, made a chance discovery of the wreck while hiking. In an interview with a correspondent for Air & Space Magazine, Sonter described coming upon the wreck:

“There was a small piece of steel poking through the leaves of the saplings. I got curious and looking down, there was a hole that this mound of earth had come out of. Then, I saw the tail flap where it meets the tail of an airplane. I can repeat the thoughts that went through my mind. I didn’t speak a word or make a sound. My brain yelled out , ‘It’s a plane!’”

The crash site was in heavily timbered mountainous terrain within the Snowy Mountains near Jagumba, about 25 km (16 mi) east of the direct Sydney–Melbourne route. Not only did the wreckage show the plane was off-course, it was facing in the wrong direction. Investigators concluded that severe weather conditions at the time of the flight most likely contributed to the crash.

A man named Stan Baker had been booked to fly on the fateful journey, but cancelled and travelled by train instead. As a result of the aircraft's disappearance, he harboured a lifelong fear of flying – which was proved justifiable when he was killed in the 1950 Australian National Airways Douglas DC-4 crash.

In Don Bradman's book Farewell to Cricket he mentions that he flew in Southern Cloud with pilot Shortridge from Adelaide to Melbourne, then to Goulburn not long before the tragedy. He described the trip as a 'bumpy journey'.

After the discovery of the wreckage, a large memorial incorporating salvaged parts from the plane was erected in the nearby town of Cooma. The crash site is 1 mile (1.6 km) north-west of Deep Creek Dam. A small stream adjacent to the crash site is named Shortridge Creek, which is a tributary of Deep Creek a short way downstream of the dam. It is unclear when the pilot's name was assigned to the stream or by whom.

The largest collection of Southern Cloud artifacts now reside at the Tumbarumba Historical Society, a small museum in the visitor center of the town. Much of the collection was assembled by Ron and Catherine Frew, Tumbarumba residents who have hiked to the site many times over the past forty years. The Frews and Sonter, also coordinate with descendants of the victims of the Southern Cloud for memorial dinners and hikes to the site for those physically able to manage the difficult terrain.

== See also ==
- List of solved missing person cases
