= Zendmast Ruiselede =

Coordinates: 51.079117°N 3.335081°E

The Zendmasts of Ruiselede were eight 287-metre (942-foot) high guyed radio masts at Ruiselede, Belgium, built in 1923 for carrying an aerial for VLF transmission (nominal frequency 16.2 kHz). On 30 December 1933, an Imperial Airways aircraft crashed into a mast and demolished it. Most of the masts were blown up by German troops in October 1940.

The masts were designed by the Belgian engineer Arthur Vierendeel.
