= Avro 618 Ten =

Airliner model by Avro

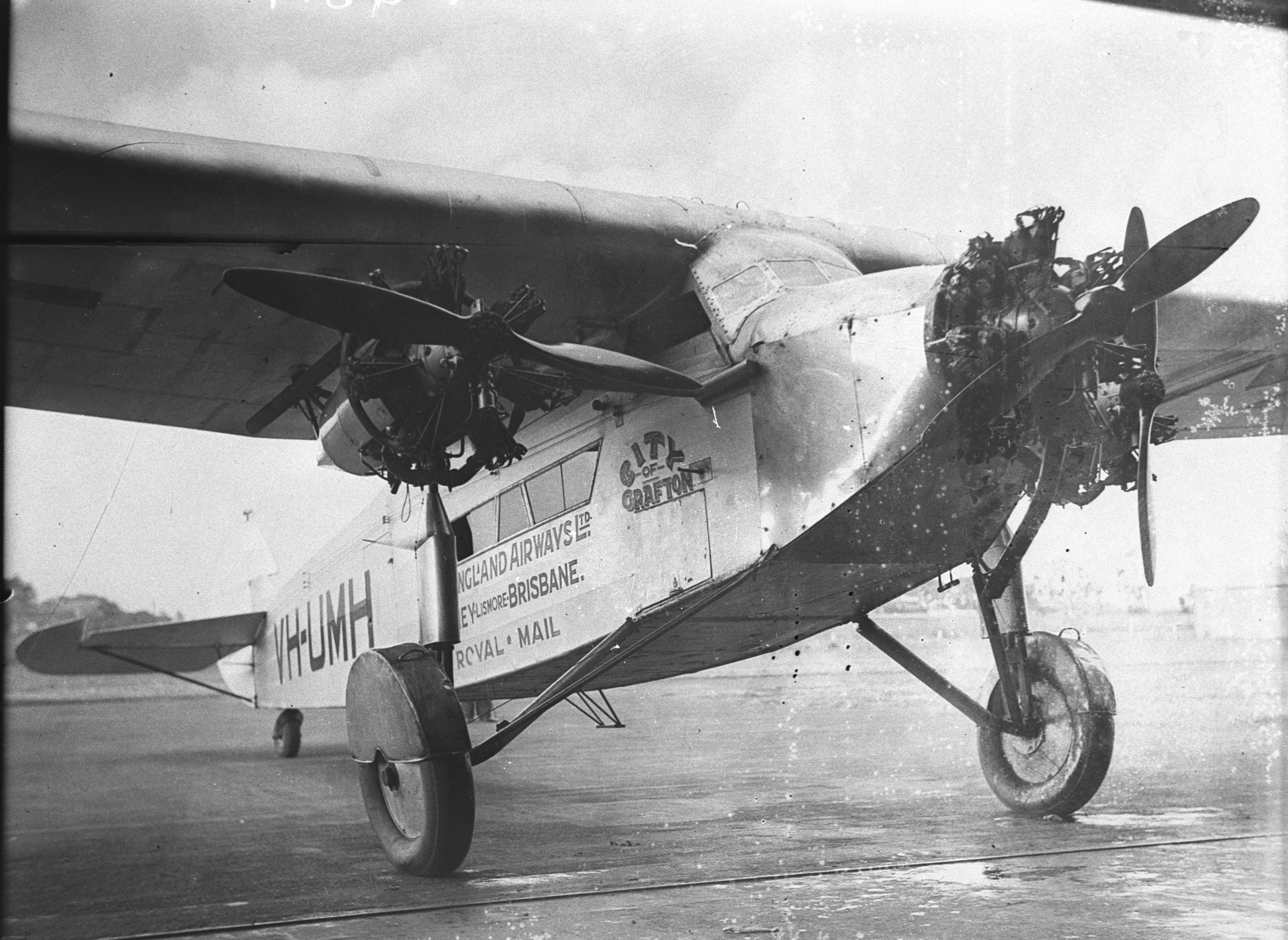
- VH-UMH as New England Airways' City of Grafton

General information
- Type: Passenger & military transport
- Manufacturer: Avro
- Designer: Anthony Fokker
- Primary user: Australian National Airways, Imperial Airways

History
- Introduction date: 1930
- Developed from: F.VIIB/3m

The Avro 618 Ten or X was a passenger transport aircraft of the 1930s. It was a licensed version by Avro of the Fokker F.VIIB/3m.

== Development ==
In 1928 Avro came to an arrangement with Fokker to license production of its successful F.VIIB/3m for sale in the British Empire (except Canada). The Avro designation 618 Ten was adopted as the aircraft was capable of carrying two crew and eight passengers. After a modification of the centre motor mounting to accommodate British airworthiness requirements, the aircraft was first displayed at the 1929 Olympia Aero Show. The Avro 642 Eighteen used the same wing as the Ten but had a new fuselage for 16 passengers.

== Operational history ==
=== Australia ===
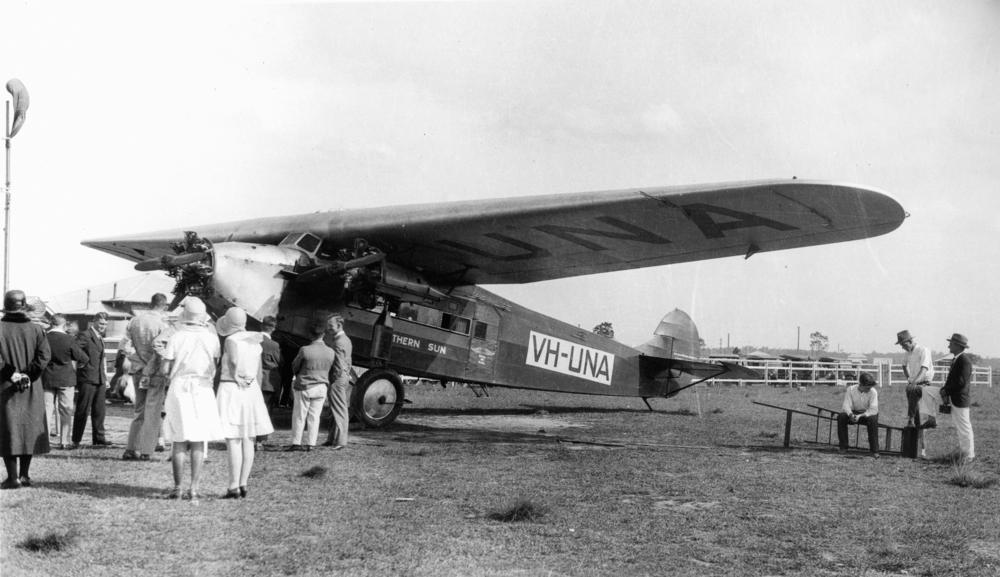
Southern Sun

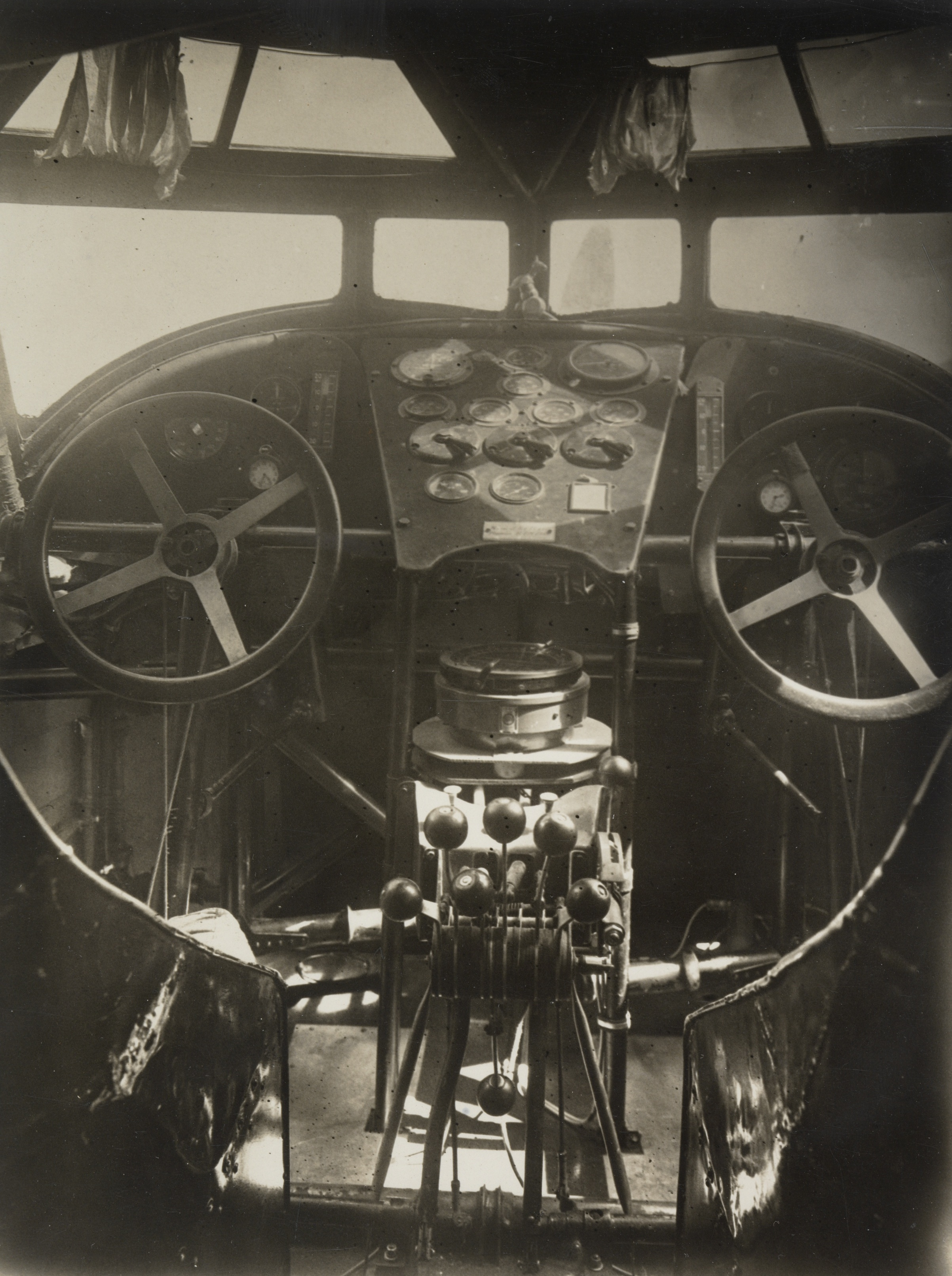
Avro 618 Ten, 'Faith in Australia' (formerly Southern Moon) cockpit, 1933

The first five aircraft were sold to the new Australian National Airways. The type entered service on 1 January 1930 on the Brisbane-Sydney route, and later Melbourne-Sydney. They were:

VH-UMF Southern Cloud
VH-UMG Southern Star
VH-UMH Southern Sky
VH-UMI Southern Moon
VH-UNA Southern Sun

Two of this fleet were lost in accidents: Southern Cloud in the Toolong range of the Australian Alps on 21 March 1931 (the wreckage was not found until 1958) and Southern Sun in Malaya in November 1931, while attempting the first airmail flight to the United Kingdom. The airline folded and the remaining aircraft were sold.

Southern Moon was rebuilt in 1933 for long-range flights, fitted with 330 hp (250 kW) Wright Whirlwind radial engines and restyled as VH-UXX Faith in Australia. The last surviving 618 Ten in Australia, it evacuated many people from New Guinea in 1941. Another two 618 Ten aircraft were also sold to Australian companies. Three of the 619 Five aircraft went to two Australian airlines, as did (after commercial service in Britain) the sole 642/2m.

=== Britain and elsewhere ===
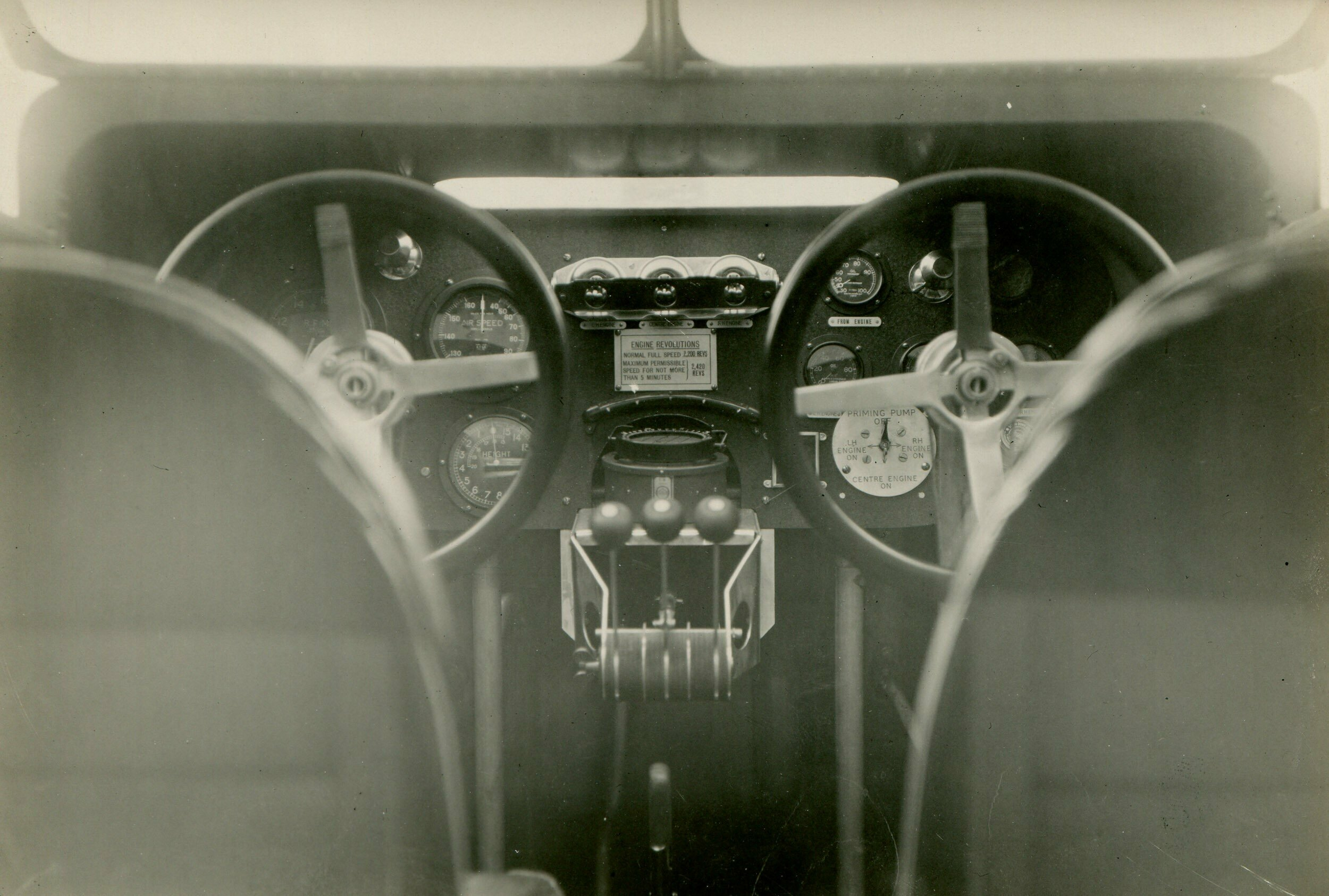
Aircraft cockpit

Four 618 Tens were delivered directly to British customers. Two went to Imperial Airways (April and June 1931) and were chartered to the Iraq Petroleum Transport Company before returning to Britain in 1933. One went to Midland & Scottish Air Ferries (May 1933) and at the end of 1931 one went to Indian State Airways for the use of the Viceroy of India. Two Tens went to the Egyptian Army air force in January 1932, one of them surviving to join Indian National Airways in September 1934. The last production Ten was delivered to the Royal Aircraft Establishment's Wireless and Equipment Flight in July 1936 with the RAF serial K2682. One of the 624 Sixes was used by A.S.T Ltd; the other two were eventually sold to the Chinese government.

== Accidents and incidents ==
- On 30 December 1933, G-ABLU Apollo of Imperial Airways collided with a radio mast and crashed at Ruysselede, Belgium, killing all ten on board.
- Avro X Southern Cloud crashed whilst en route from Sydney to Melbourne on 21 March 1931, with two crew and eight passengers, but with no survivors. The wreckage was located by chance, off course and facing in the wrong direction, in October 1958 by Thomas Sonter, a New Zealand carpenter employed by the Snowy Mountains Scheme, whilst he was hiking.
- On 3 April 1940, a BOAC Avro 618 Ten (G-AASP, Hercules) crashed on takeoff from Cairo; there were no casualties, but the aircraft was written off.

== Variants ==
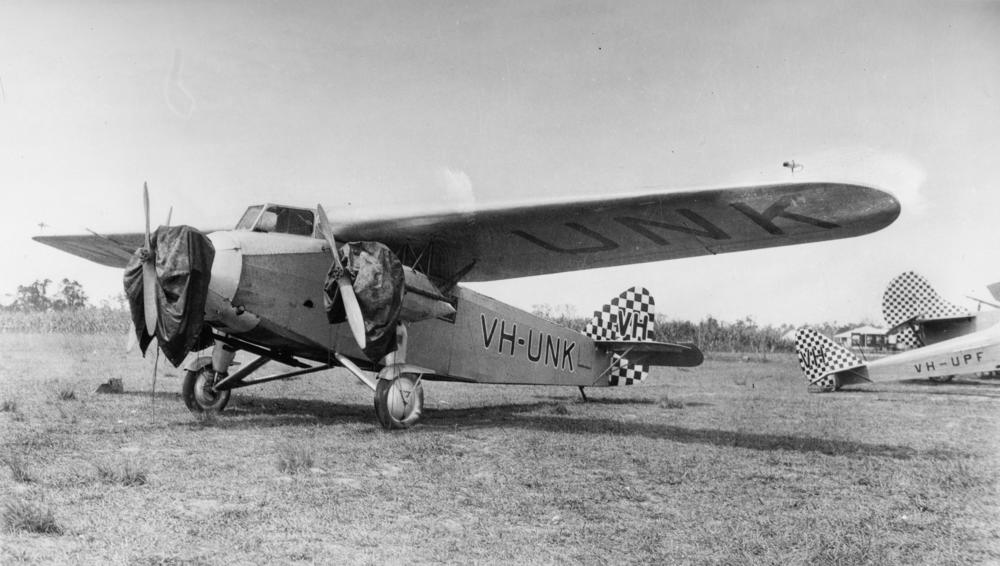
Star of Cairns, Avro 619 Five

- Type 618 Ten : Ten-seat civil transport aircraft. Fourteen built.
- Type 619 Five : Five-seat civil transport aircraft. Scaled-down version of Avro Ten. Three 105 hp (78 kW) Armstrong Siddeley Genet Major 1 engines. Four aircraft built.
- Type 624 Six : Six-seat civil transport aircraft. Revised version of Avro Five with accommodation for two pilots and four passengers. Three Genet engines again, but the outer engines in fairings merged into the underside of the wings. Three aircraft built.

== Operators ==
=== Civil operators ===
Australia

- Airlines of Australia
- Australian National Airways
- Australian Transcontinental Airways
- W.R.Carpenter Airlines (later Mandated Airlines)
- Far Eastern Aviation Company
- Hart Aircraft Co.
- Kingsford Smith Air Service Ltd.
- New England Airways (see Keith Virtue)
- Queensland Air Navigation Co.
- Stephens Aviation (New Guinea based)

China

- The Government of China

British India

- Indian National Airways
- Indian State Airways

United Kingdom

- Air Service Training Ltd.
- Commercial Air Hire
- Imperial Airways
- Midland and Scottish Air Ferries
- Wilson Airways (Kenya based)

=== Military operators ===
Egypt

- Egyptian Army Air Force

United Kingdom

- Royal Air Force
- Royal Aircraft Establishment

== Specifications (Avro 618) ==
Data from Avro Aircraft since 1908

General characteristics

- Crew: 2
- Capacity: 8 pax
- Length: 47 ft 6 in (14.48 m)
- Wingspan: 71 ft 3 in (21.72 m)
- Height: 12 ft 9 in (3.89 m)
- Wing area: 772 sq ft (71.7 m^{2})
- Empty weight: 6,020 lb (2,731 kg)
- Max takeoff weight: 10,600 lb (4,808 kg)
- Powerplant: 3 × Armstrong Siddeley Lynx IVB or IVC 7-cylinder air-cooled radial piston engines, 240 hp (180 kW) each
- Propellers: 2-bladed fixed-pitch propellers

Performance

- Maximum speed: 115 mph (185 km/h, 100 kn)
- Cruise speed: 100 mph (160 km/h, 87 kn)
- Range: 400 mi (640 km, 350 nmi)
- Service ceiling: 16,000 ft (4,900 m)
- Rate of climb: 675 ft/min (3.43 m/s)

== See also ==
Notable pilots

- Charles Ulm

Related development

- Fokker F.VIIB/3m
- Avro 642 Eighteen

Related lists

- List of aircraft of the RAF
