= Keith Virtue =

Australian aviator

Keith Allison Virtue MBE (23 June 1909 – 7 February 1980) was a pioneer Australian aviator. Sir Lawrence Wackett, in the foreword of Keith Virtue's biography, writes that he was an experienced airman himself but he marvelled at the ability and skill of Keith Virtue and counts him as one of the greatest of the Australians who devoted their life's work to the task of pioneering airlines in Australia.

== Early life ==
Keith Virtue was born in Lismore, New South Wales, the son of an Irish-born dairyfarmer. He was the youngest of 13 children of Robert and Jane Virtue (née Noble).

His obsession with flying started as a boy of 11 in 1920 when Edgar Percival landed his Avro 504 K biplane on a paddock on the edge of Lismore and he watched his parents embark on a joyflight. At 15, he started a course through the International Correspondence School on motor car engineering, then switched to aircraft engineering. When he was 18, he was talking of trying to build his own plane with a four-cylinder Henderson Motorcycle engine, when his father announced "Get up to Brisbane. Learn to Fly. And I'll buy you a plane". The next week he was taking lessons in a Cirrus Moth under the instruction of Captain Lester Brain at the Qantas Flying School at Eagle Farm.

At 19 he had his licence – signed in Melbourne by Coleman, the Secretary for Air, in November 1928. Soon he had his "A" licence and the Gipsy Moth promised by his father was ready and waiting.

== Virtue's Air Travel ==
Keith Virtue and his brother, Ralph Virtue, went into business as "Virtue's Air Travel", painting the caption in large black letters on the Gypsy Moth. They placed advertisements in Lismore and soon had passengers for joy flights, pupils for flying instruction and passengers for longer flights.

== New England Airways (1931–1936) ==
Aged 19, Keith Virtue and his future father-in-law, G.A. Robinson, established New England Airways (later Airlines of Australia). In her biography of Keith Virtue, "Virtue in Flying", Joan Priest writes "New England Airways took over where Smithy and Ulm left off, renewing the Sydney–Brisbane link from 1930, and for a time in the Depression years providing the only airline service on Australia's east coast".

New England Airways was incorporated on 1 January 1931, with G.A. Robinson managing director and Keith Virtue a Director and Chief Pilot. One of the shareholders was Dr Banks, and various members of the Robinson family also invested.

They commenced a regular service between Lismore and Brisbane as well as charter and joyflights.

Keith Virtue and New England Airways colleague Tommy Young flew in formation with Charles Kingsford Smith for the Sydney Harbour Bridge opening on 19 March 1932. They were in Avro 618 Tens, the City of Sydney and City of Brisbane, with Charles Kingsford Smith in the Southern Cross.

In 1935, New England Airways figures showed a record of over a million miles flown and approximately 21500 passengers carried safely on their Sydney–Brisbane mail planes.

== Airlines of Australia (1936–1942) ==
In October 1935 a new company was floated to replace and incorporate New England Airways, backed by the British Pacific Trust, and named Airlines of Australia Ltd. It also acquired the Larkin Aircraft Supply Company in Melbourne. G.A. Robinson remained managing director and Lord Sempill and H.C. Armstrong were among the Directors. The purpose was to extend aerial services from Cairns–Townsville–Brisbane–Sydney–Melbourne and beyond. Keith Virtue was appointed Flying Superintendent.

Australian National Airways gained a controlling interest in Airlines of Australia in April 1937, although the two airlines retained separate public identities until 1942.

== Royal Australian Air Force (1939–1947) ==
Keith Virtue served as a Flight Lieutenant in the Royal Australian Air Force during World War II. He enlisted 11 September 1939 and was discharged on 1 July 1947. During this time, Keith was involved in supplying equipment to Australian soldiers in New Guinea. The planes couldn't land, so equipment was pushed out of the low flying planes. This was referred to as "biscuit bombing".

== Australian National Airways (1942–1954) ==
As a 42-year-old veteran in 1951, Keith Virtue took off from Sydney in his ANA Skymaster to become the first Australian to have spent 20000 hours in the air.

On 15 November 1954, one mistake in 23170 hours of flying, when he failed to lower the undercarriage of DC-4 Skymaster VH-ANF when landing in Brisbane, led to his retirement from commercial flying in Australia.

== Marriage and family ==
Keith Virtue married Nita Monica Robinson, daughter of co-founder of New England Airways, G.A. Robinson, at Lismore in 1934. They had two sons, Michael and Peter and a daughter, Jan. Both Michael and Peter followed in their father's footsteps as Australian commercial airline pilots.

== Retirement ==
After Keith Virtue retired he spent a good part of his time on the golf course. He was a life member of the Brisbane Golf Club.

Keith Virtue died on the golf course on 7 February 1980.

== See also ==
- Avro 618 Ten
