= Australian National Airways (1930) =

Short-lived Australian airline, founded in 1929

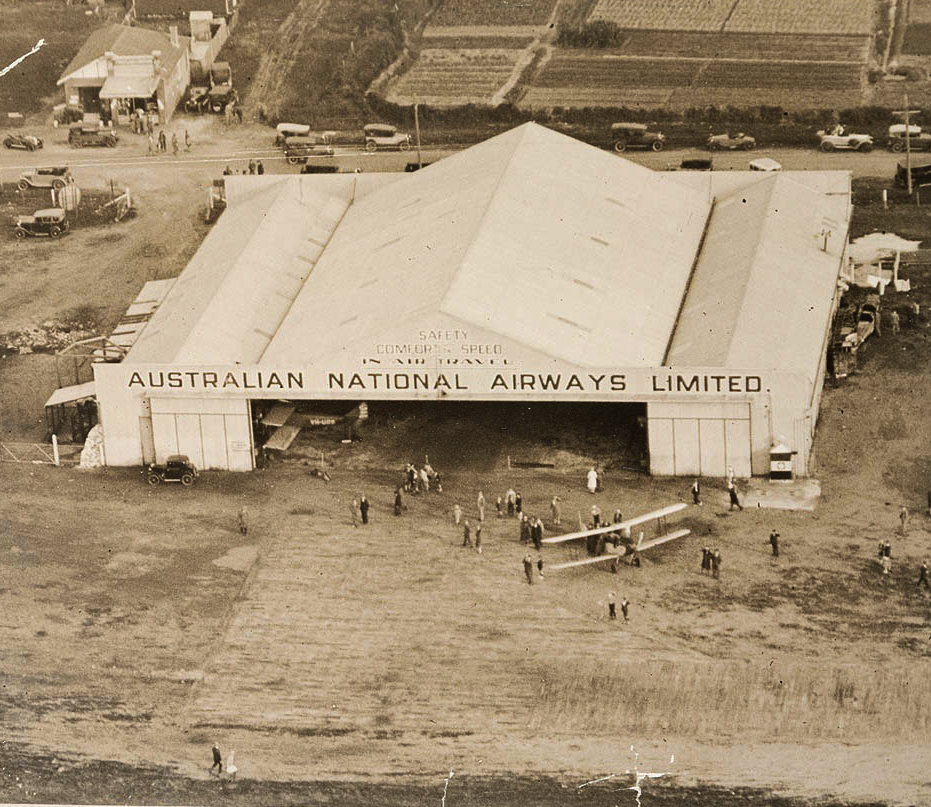
- Australian National Airways Limited (A.N.A.) hangar, Kingsford Smith Airport, Mascot
- Founded: 1929
- Commenced operations: January 1930
- Ceased operations: 1931
- Fleet size: See Aircraft below
- Key people: Charles Kingsford Smith; Charles Ulm

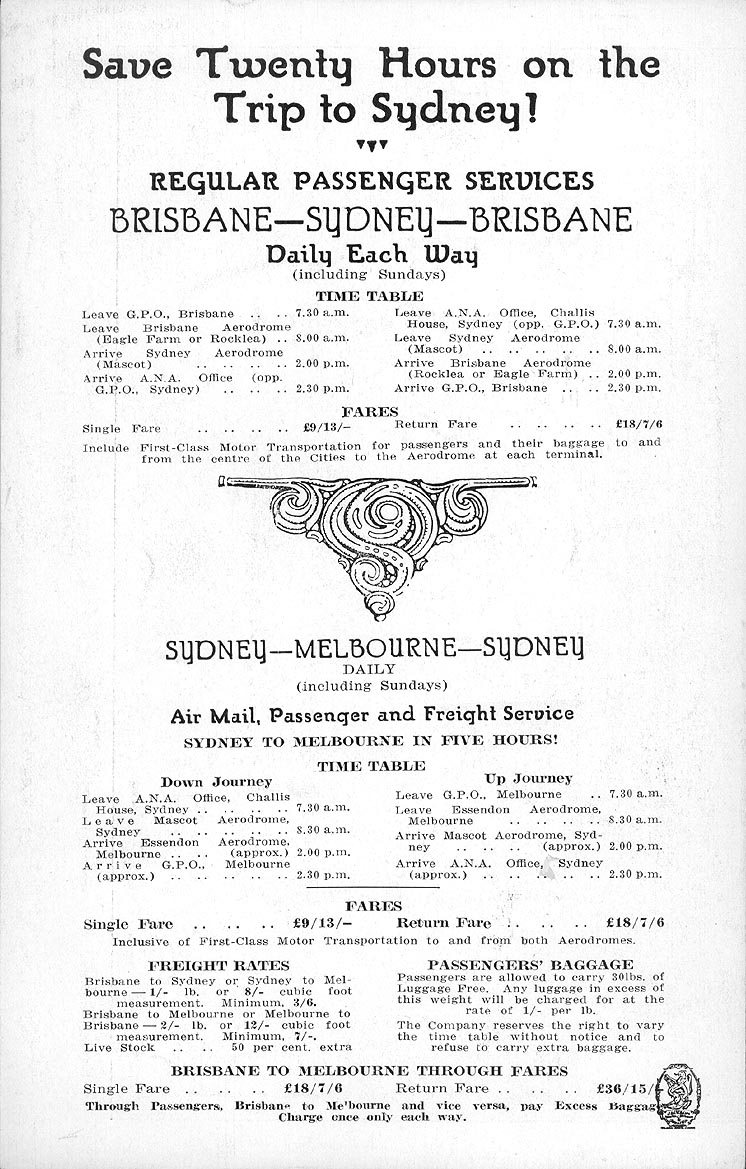
Australian National Airways timetable from 1930

Australian National Airways, Ltd. (ANA) was a short-lived Australian airline, founded on 3 January 1929 by Charles Kingsford Smith and Charles Ulm.

ANA began scheduled services on 1 January 1930. It owned five Avro 618 Tens, that were British license-built versions of Kingsford Smith and Ulm's famous Fokker VII/3m Southern Cross, which also flew as an ANA aircraft although was not owned by it.

The company operated a regular passenger and airmail service between Brisbane, Sydney and Melbourne that was in January 1931 extended to Launceston and Hobart in Tasmania. Unable to obtain a formal mail subsidy, the deepening Great Depression saw revenues fall, a situation that worsened after the crash of VH-UMF Southern Cloud in the Australian Alps between Sydney and Melbourne on 21 March 1931. ANA ceased scheduled services at the end of June 1931, although it continued to operate joy flights mostly around New South Wales, and offered pilot training services with a fleet of small aircraft.

Late in 1931 ANA attempted to open an Australia-England airmail service with a special Christmas airmail flight that was interrupted by the crash of VH-UNA Southern Sun in Malaya. After lengthy efforts to interest the Australian Government in subsidising a regular Australia-UK airmail service failed, ANA went into voluntary liquidation in April 1933, and its remaining assets were sold off.

== Aircraft ==
VH-UMF Southern Cloud (crashed March 1931)
VH-UMG Southern Star. Sold March 1933 to Hart Aircraft Service of Melbourne to operate a regular Melbourne-Launceston service and renamed Tasman.
VH-UMH Southern Sky, sold to Keith Virtue's New England Airways.
VH-UMI Southern Moon. Sold 1933 to Charles Ulm, rebuilt as the long-distance flight aircraft VH-UXX Faith in Australia.
VH-UNA Southern Sun (crashed November 1931)
VH-USU Southern Cross, owned privately by Kingsford Smith and Ulm.
VH-UOB Avro Avian, used for flight training.
VH-UKE Westland Widgeon, used for flight training.
VH-UQG Avro 616 Sports Avian Southern Cross Minor, used by Kingsford Smith in attempted record flight 1931 then sold.
VH-UOL Avro 621 Tutor, used for flight training.
VH-UIC De Havilland DH.60G Gipsy Moth, apparently used for flight training.

== See also ==
- List of defunct airlines of Australia
- Aviation in Australia
