= Avro 642 Eighteen =

Eighteen
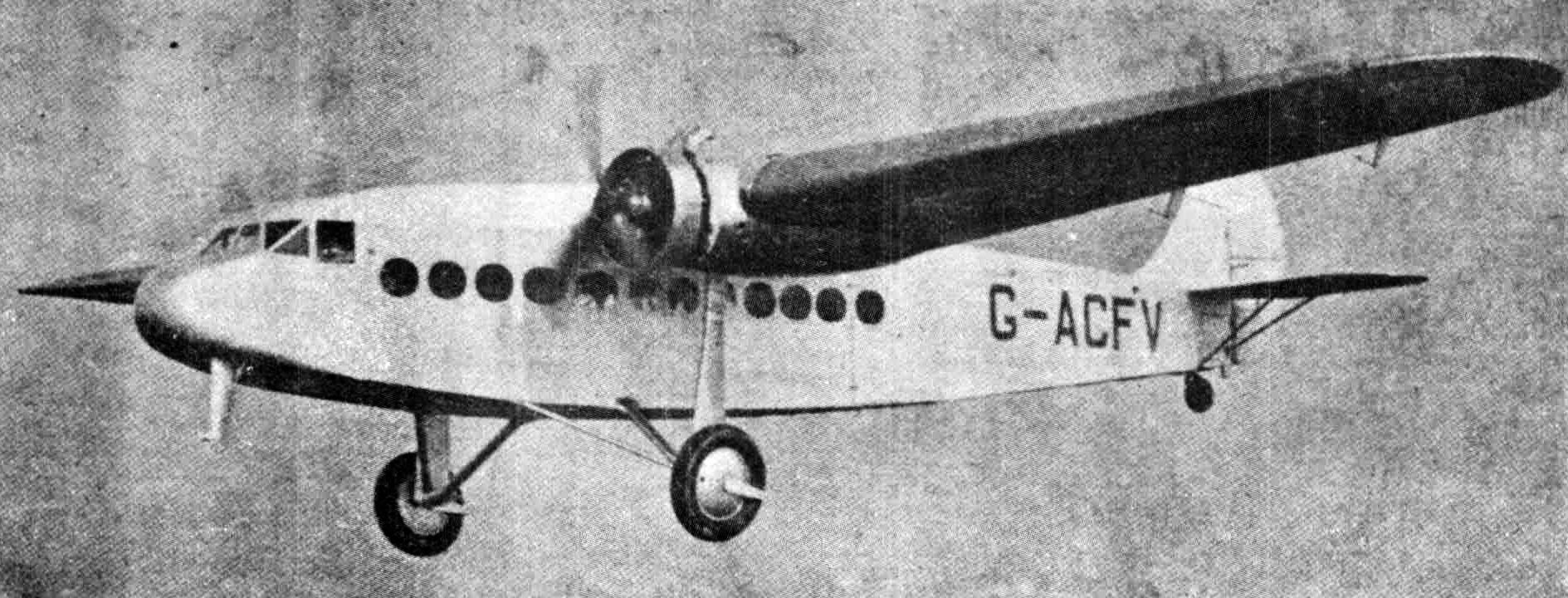
- Avro 642 (twin engine version, revised nose)

General information
- Type: Airliner
- Manufacturer: Avro
- Number built: 2

History
- Introduction date: 6 April 1934
- First flight: 1934
- Developed from: Avro 618 Ten

The Avro 642 Eighteen was a 1930s British monoplane airliner. Only two were built — one twin engine and the other four engine. The original had a circular partially glazed nose, but this was changed to a more traditional one. It used the wing of the Avro 618 Ten, which was a license produced Fokker V.II.

The twin engine aircraft was used until it was destroyed during World War II, in early 1942. The four engine model was used in British India until 1940.

== Development ==
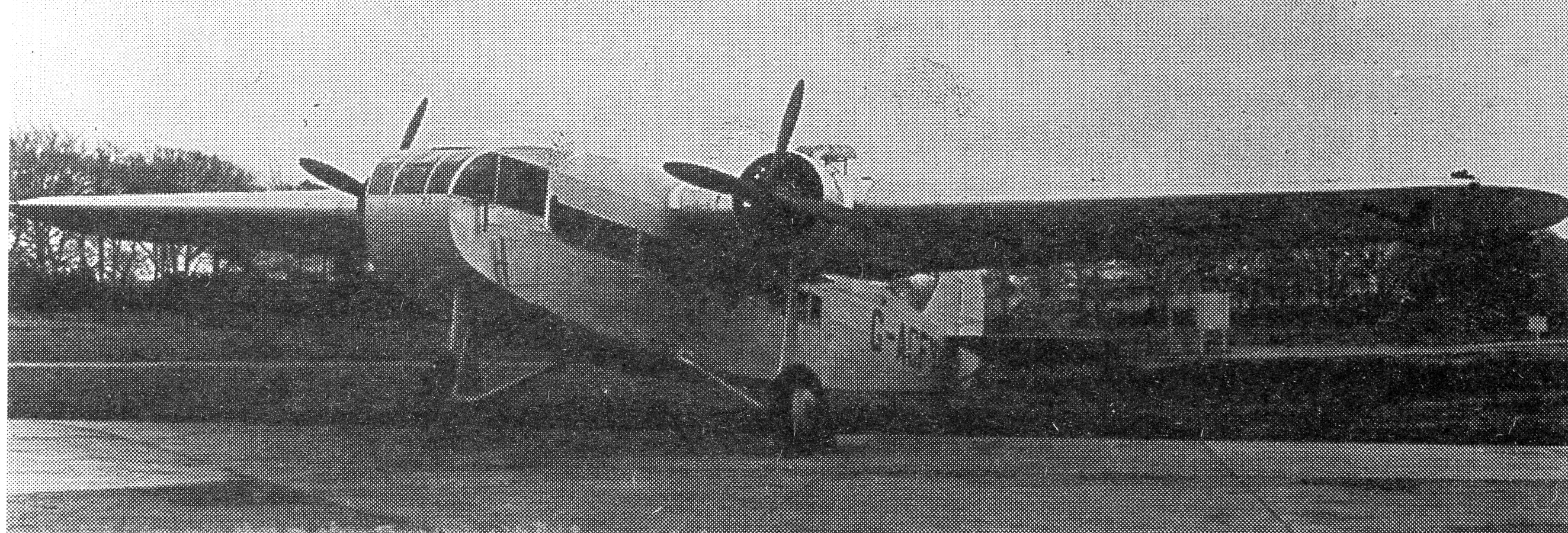
The Avro 642/2m with original, pre-delivery semi-circular nose

As a follow-on to the Avro 618 Ten, the Avro 642 Eighteen was a larger aircraft but used a modified Avro Ten wing. The wing was moved to the shoulder position with the engines mounted on the wing and a new larger fuselage was used. When the design was completed in February 1933 it was the largest aircraft designed by Avro. The new fuselage was a fabric-covered welded steel structure with seats for 16 passengers, a baggage area and a toilet. The nose section was made of wood and originally had a semi-circular glazed front, although this was later changed to a more conventional-type windscreen. The wooden wing was designed to use any of the engines in the Armstrong-Siddeley family and the first aircraft was built with two Armstrong Siddeley Jaguar VID engines with four-bladed propellers.

With an order from the Midland and Scottish Air Ferries the first aircraft was nearly complete by December 1933. Registered G-ACFV the aircraft performed official performance trials at Martlesham Heath and was then returned to Woodford Aerodrome when the nose was modified. On 6 April 1934, G-ACFV was handed over to the customer and was then flown to Castle Bromwich to pick up Prime Minister Ramsay MacDonald and the Secretary of State for Air Lord Londonderry. With these important passengers on board, G-ACFV was flown to Speke Aerodrome so that they could declare open a new air service between Glasgow, London and Belfast. At the same time Lord Londonderry named the aircraft The Marchioness of Londonderry. Following the ceremony the Prime Minister and party were flown to Heston Aerodrome in London.

The second aircraft was ordered by the Viceroy of India, Lord Willingdon and was completed in November 1934 with four Armstrong Siddeley Lynx IVC engines and long rectangular windows on each side.

== Operational history ==
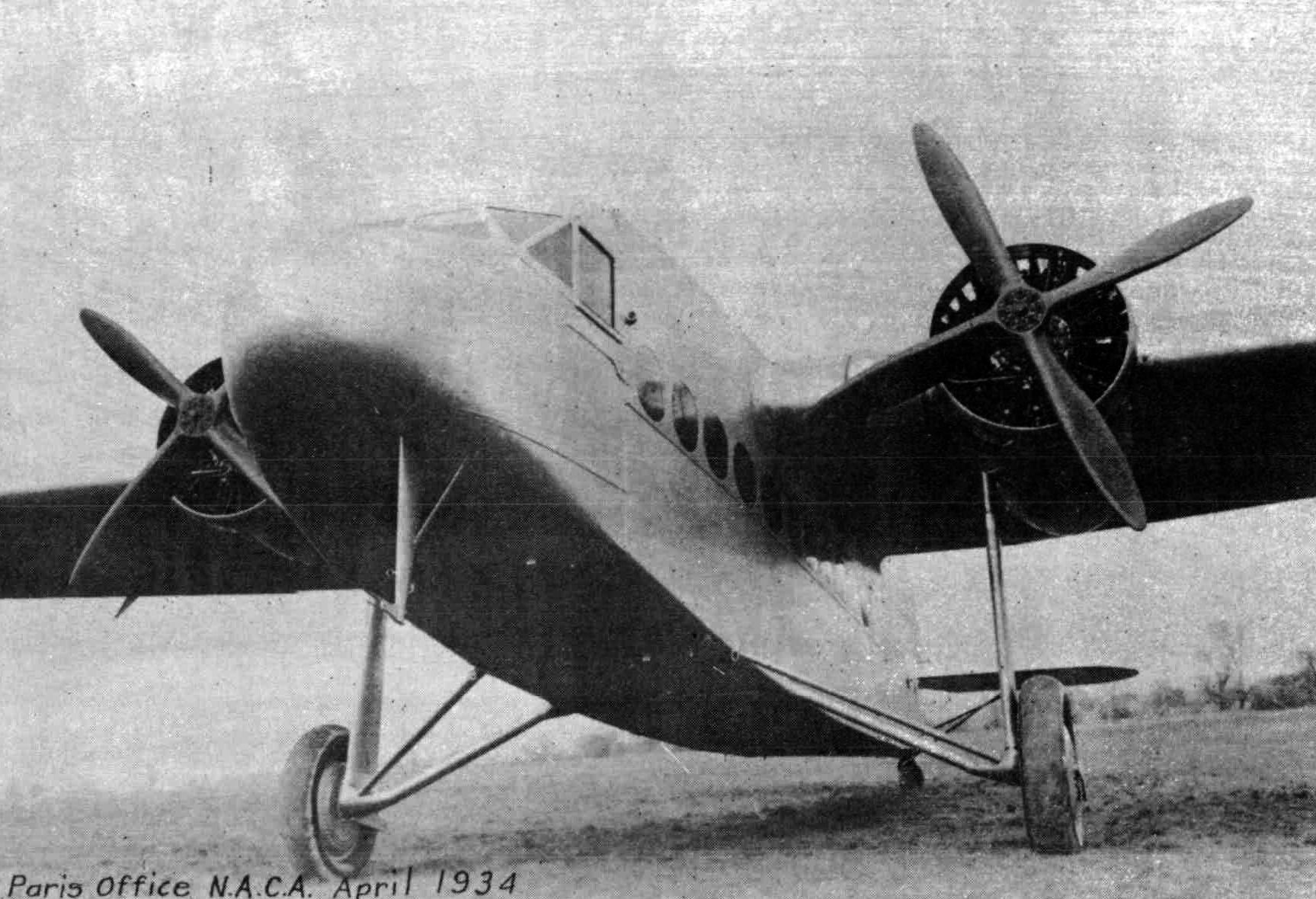
The revised nose

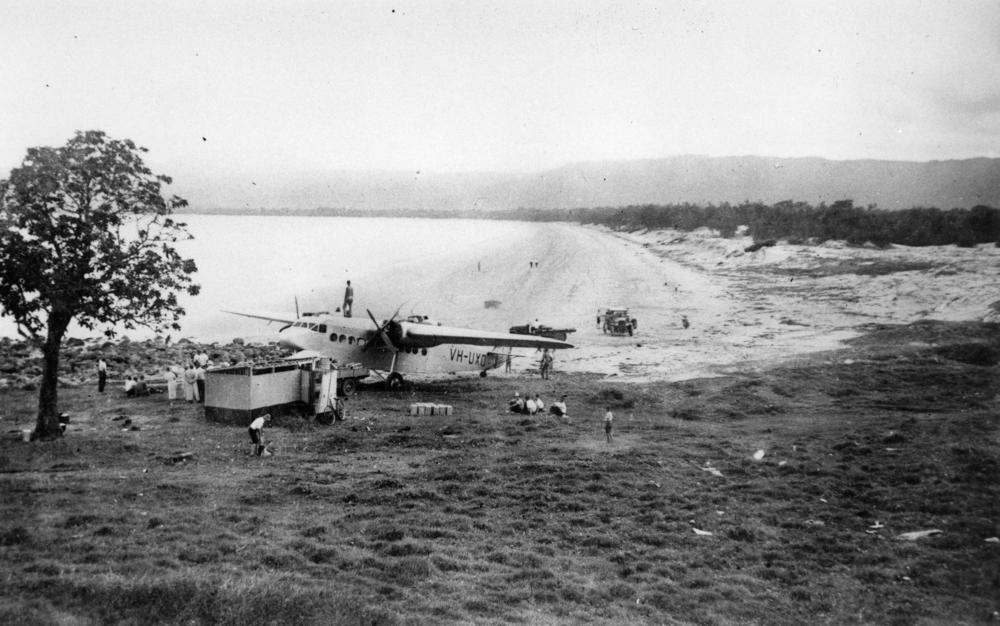
Avro 642/2m (VH-UXD) on Four Mile Beach, Port Douglas

From 6 April 1934, the Eighteen was used with other aircraft on the Glasgow-London-Belfast service after being bought by Midland and Scottish Air Ferries. In May 1935 G-ACFV was sold to Brian Allen Aviation for use with a variety of associated companies including Commercial Air Hire of Croydon who used it for continental newspaper deliveries during 1935-1936, and Air Dispatch Ltd. CAH used the aircraft for excursions and joyriding duties while Air Dispatch operated a daily newspaper flight between London and Paris, and a passenger service on the weekend. Due to the increase in freight business, the aircraft was fitted with a larger loading door. Last flown by Commercial Air Hire in June 1936, a sightseeing trip around the RMS Queen Mary, the aircraft was sold twice as VH-UXD to W. R. Carpenter & Co. Ltd. in Australia, followed by Mandated Airlines of New Guinea who both used the plane for the transportation of mail. She was destroyed in New Guinea on 21 January 1942 by Japanese military forces.

The four engine aircraft Registered VT-AFM was delivered to India on 12 December 1934 and named the Star of India. By arrangement with the Indian Government the aircraft was operated and maintained by Indian National Airways when not required by the Viceroy. The aircraft was taken over by the Royal Air Force as L9166 in 1937 for use by AHQ India and was dismantled at Delhi in 1940. It has been said that the performance of the four engine aircraft was poor, even dangerous, due to the reduced wing area caused by the extra "power-eggs".

== Variants ==
642/2m
Two 450 hp (336 kW) Armstrong Siddeley Jaguar VID engines mounted on the wings, one built.
642/4m
Four 215 hp (160 kW) Armstrong Siddeley Lynx engines, one built.

== Operators ==
Australia

- Mandated Airlines

British India

- Indian National Airways

United Kingdom

- Commercial Air Hire
- Midland and Scottish Air Ferries
- Royal Air Force

== Specifications (641/2m) ==
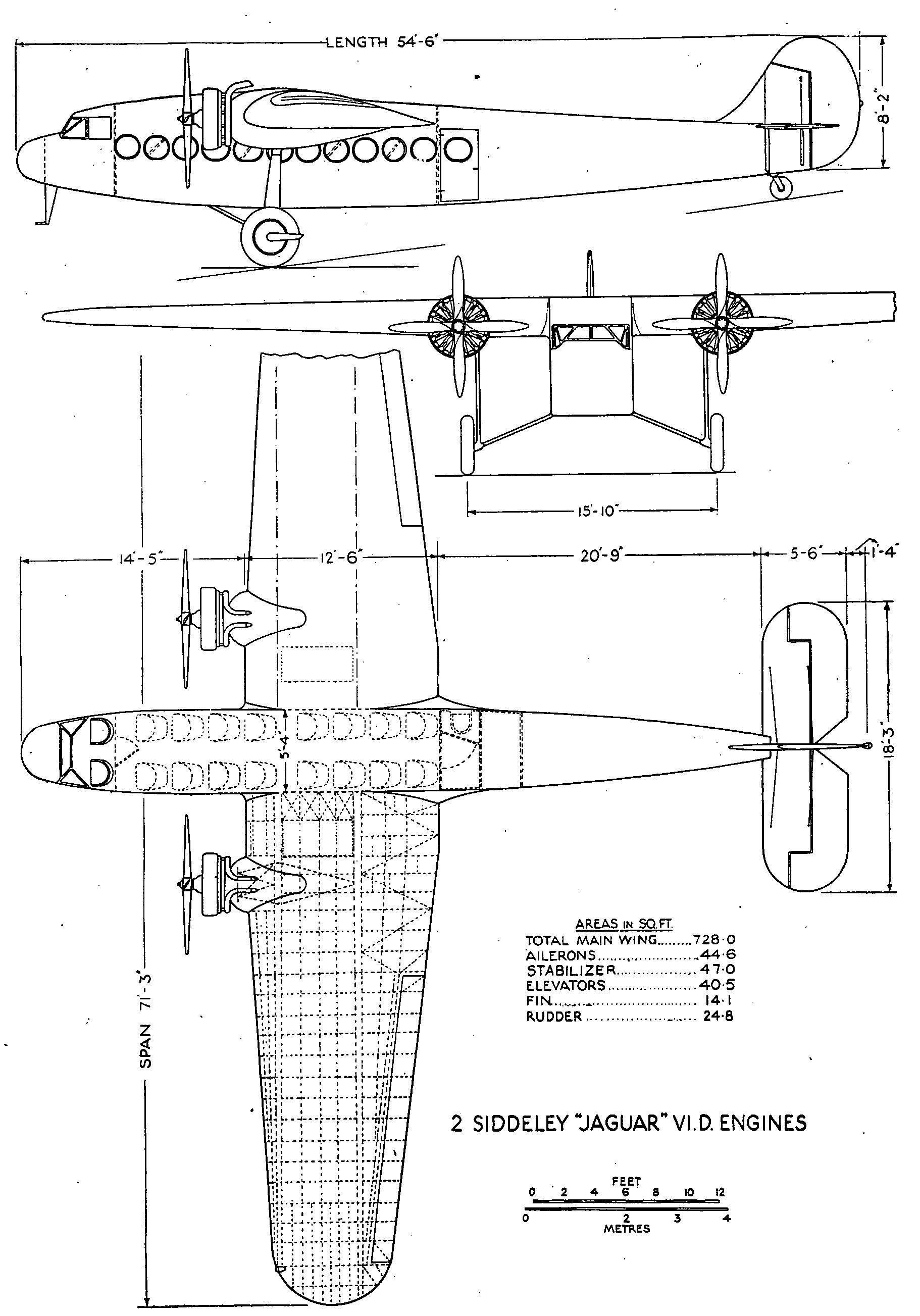
Avro 642 3-view drawing from NACA-AC-191

Data from British Civil Aircraft since 1919 Volume 1

General characteristics

- Crew: two
- Capacity: 16 passengers
- Length: 54 ft 6 in (16.62 m)
- Wingspan: 71 ft 3 in (21.72 m)
- Height: 11 ft 6 in (3.51 m)
- Wing area: 728 sq ft (67.7 m^{2})
- Empty weight: 7,360 lb (3,345 kg)
- Gross weight: 11,800 lb (5,363 kg)
- Powerplant: 2 × Armstrong Siddeley Jaguar IVD , 450 hp (336 kW) each

Performance

- Maximum speed: 160 mph (258 km/h, 140 kn)
- Range: 600 mi (970 km, 520 nmi)
- Service ceiling: 15,500 ft (4,275 m)
- Rate of climb: 970 ft/min (4.9 m/s)

== See also ==
Related development

- Avro 618 Ten

Related lists

- List of aircraft of the RAF

== Bibliography ==
- Jackson, A.J. (1973). British Civil Aircraft since 1919 Volume 1. London: Putnam. ISBN 0-370-10006-9.
- Robertson, Bruce (1987). British Military Aircraft Serials 1878-1987. Letchworth, England: Midland Counties Publications. ISBN 0-904597-61-X.
- Joubert, Philip (1964). Fun and Games. London, England: Huchinson & Co.
