= 1933 Imperial Airways Ruysselede crash =

Aircraft crash

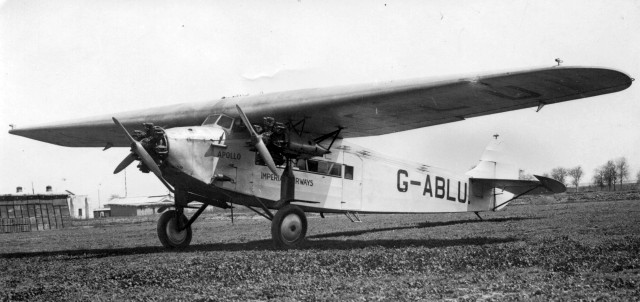
- G-ABLU, the Avro Ten involved in the accident.

Accident
- Date: 30 December 1933
- Summary: Controlled flight into terrain due to pilot error
- Site: Ruysselede, West Flanders, Belgium; 51°4′41.98″N 3°20′5.44″E

Aircraft
- Aircraft type: Avro Ten
- Aircraft name: Apollo
- Operator: Imperial Airways
- Registration: G-ABLU
- Flight origin: Cologne Butzweilerhof Airport, Germany
- Stopover: Haren Airport, Brussels, Belgium
- Destination: Croydon Airport, United Kingdom
- Passengers: 8
- Crew: 2
- Fatalities: 10
- Survivors: 0

The 1933 Imperial Airways Ruysselede crash occurred on 30 December 1933 when an Imperial Airways Avro Ten collided with one of the radio masts of Belradio at Ruysselede, West Flanders, Belgium and crashed killing all ten people on board. The aircraft was operating an international scheduled passenger flight from Cologne, Germany to London, England via Brussels, Belgium.

== Aircraft ==
The accident aircraft was Avro Ten registration G-ABLU, c/n 528. The aircraft had entered service with Imperial Airways in May 1931 and having served for a time with Iraq Petroleum Transport Co., it had returned to Imperial Airways. The aircraft was named Apollo.

== Accident ==
Operating a flight from Cologne, Germany to Croydon Airport, United Kingdom via Haren Airport, Brussels, Belgium, the aircraft departed at 12:20 local time (11:20 GMT), which was 20 minutes later than scheduled. As a result of fog, the aircraft was flying on a route to the north of its normal route. At 13:15, whilst flying at an altitude of 250 feet (76 m), it crashed into a guy wire of the 870 feet (270 m) tall radio mast at Ruysselede, which was illuminated at the time. The top section of the mast was demolished. The aircraft lost a wing and crashed. Four workers at the radio station rushed to the aid of those on board the aircraft, as did twelve villagers from Ruysselede. At least one passenger was seen to have survived the crash. There was an explosion and the wreckage of the aircraft was burnt out. The rescuers all suffered burns.

== Casualties ==
All ten passengers and crew on the aircraft were killed. Four rescuers suffered burns.

Nationality	Crew	Passengers	Total
United Kingdom	2	5	7
Netherlands	–	2	2
Poland	–	1	1
Total	2	8	10

== Investigation ==
The accident was investigated by Belgian authorities. The British Accidents Investigation Branch sent a representative to assist in the investigation.

== Awards ==
The relatives of one of the victims praised the bravery of one of the rescuers, and pressed for him to be rewarded for his courage. King Albert I awarded Camille van Hove the Civic Cross (1st Class) for his efforts in attempting to rescue the victims of the crash. Mr van Hove received serious burns and was still in hospital in Bruges at the time the award was notified. Nine other rescuers were given rewards of money.
