= Ruiselede =

- Municipality
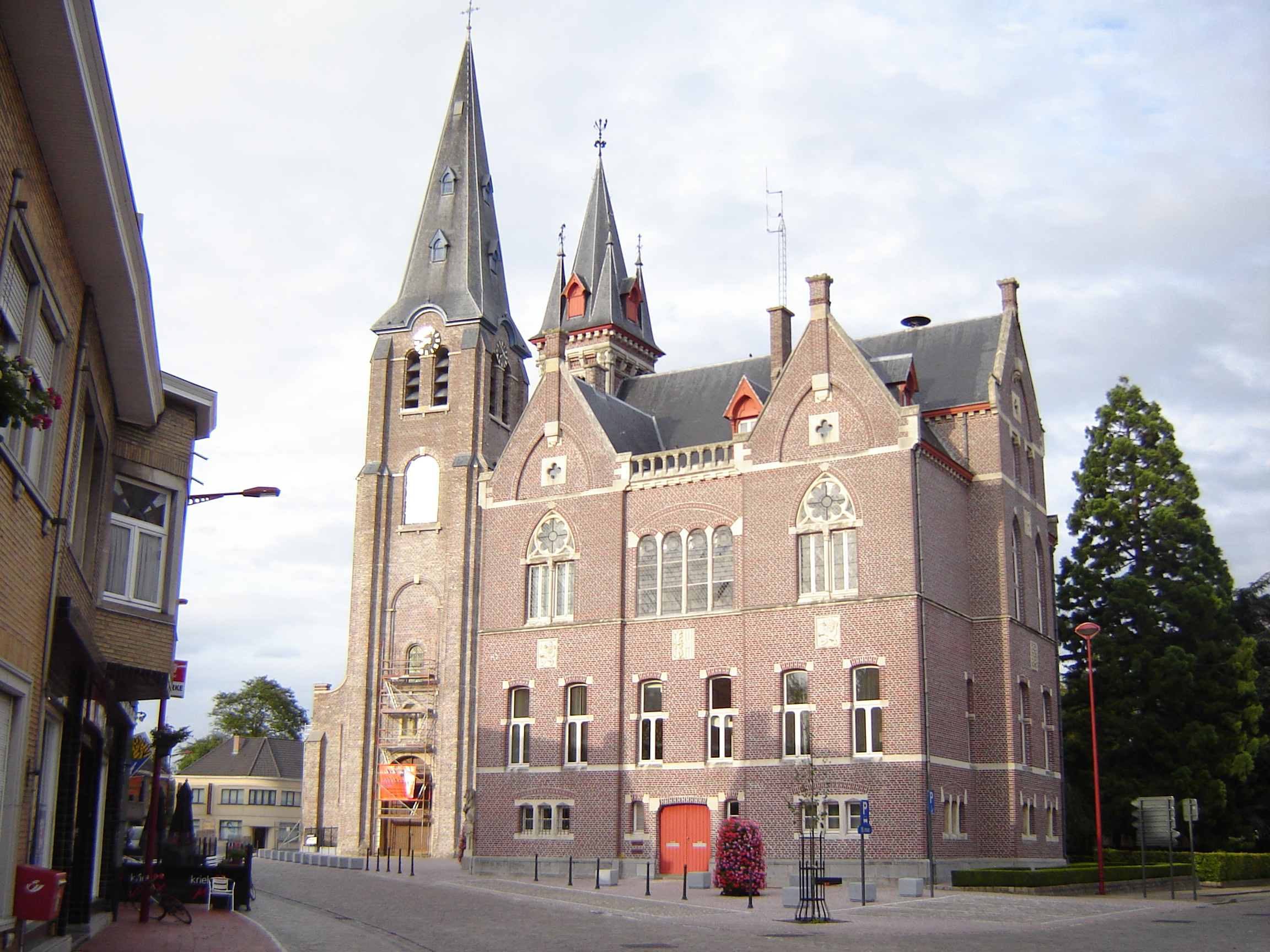
- Village centre, with town hall and church of Our Lady

- Flag Coat of arms

- Location of Ruiselede in West Flanders
- Interactive map of Ruiselede
- Location in Belgium
- Coordinates: 51°02′N 03°23′E
- Country: Belgium
- Community: Flemish Community
- Region: Flemish Region
- Province: West Flanders
- Arrondissement: Tielt

Government
  - Mayor: Greet De Roo (RKD)
  - Governing party: RKD

Population (2018-01-01)
  - Total: 5,387
- Postal codes: 8755
- NIS code: 37012
- Area codes: 051
- Website: www.ruiselede.be

Ruiselede (Dutch pronunciation: [ˈrœysəˌleːdə]; West Flemish: Ruuslee; historically Ruysselede) is a former municipality located in the Belgian province of West Flanders. This town only comprises the town of Ruiselede proper. On January 1, 2006, Ruiselede had a total population of 5,113. The total area is 30.20 km^{2} which gives a population density of 169 inhabitants per km^{2}.

Ruiselede was the location of a coastal radio site. From 1923 to 1940 it had a VLF aerial. On 30 December 1933, the mast was demolished when an aircraft collided with it.

== Gallery ==
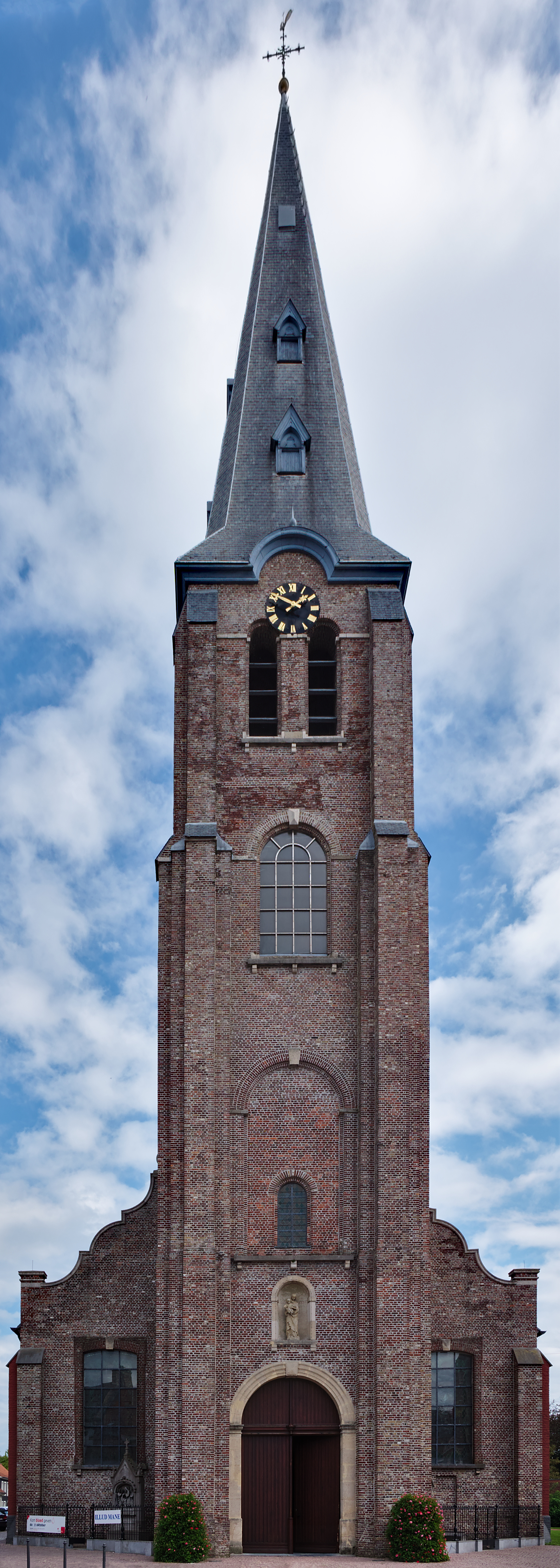
Onze-Lieve-Vrouw-ten-Hemelopnemingskerk (Ruiselede)
