= Midland & Scottish Air Ferries =

Scottish airline (1933–1934)

Midland & Scottish Air Ferries Ltd.
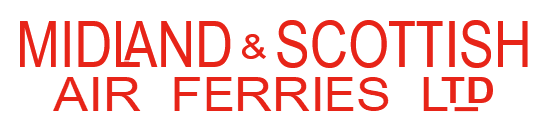
- Founded: 10 March 1933
- Ceased operations: 30 September 1934
- Operating bases: Glasgow Renfrew Airport
- Secondary hubs: Liverpool Speke Airport
- Destinations: Campbeltown, Islay, Dublin, Belfast, London
- Headquarters: Renfrew Airport
- Key people: John C. Sword

Midland & Scottish Air Ferries was Scotland's first airline, operating from 1933 to 1934. It is particularly noted for pioneering flights to the Inner Hebrides.

== History ==
=== Foundation ===
John Cuthill Sword started Midland Bus Services in Airdrie, to the east of Glasgow in 1924, and it grew into a substantial concern, operating over 500 buses. He was a pioneer of diesel engines for motor transport vehicles. In 1929 Midland Bus Services was merged into Scottish Transport, which in June 1932 was renamed Western SMT, part of the Scottish Motor Traction (SMT) company based in Edinburgh. As a result, Sword was paid around £290,000 (equivalent to £17,502,000 in 2025) for his company, became general manager of Western SMT, and was appointed to the SMT board.

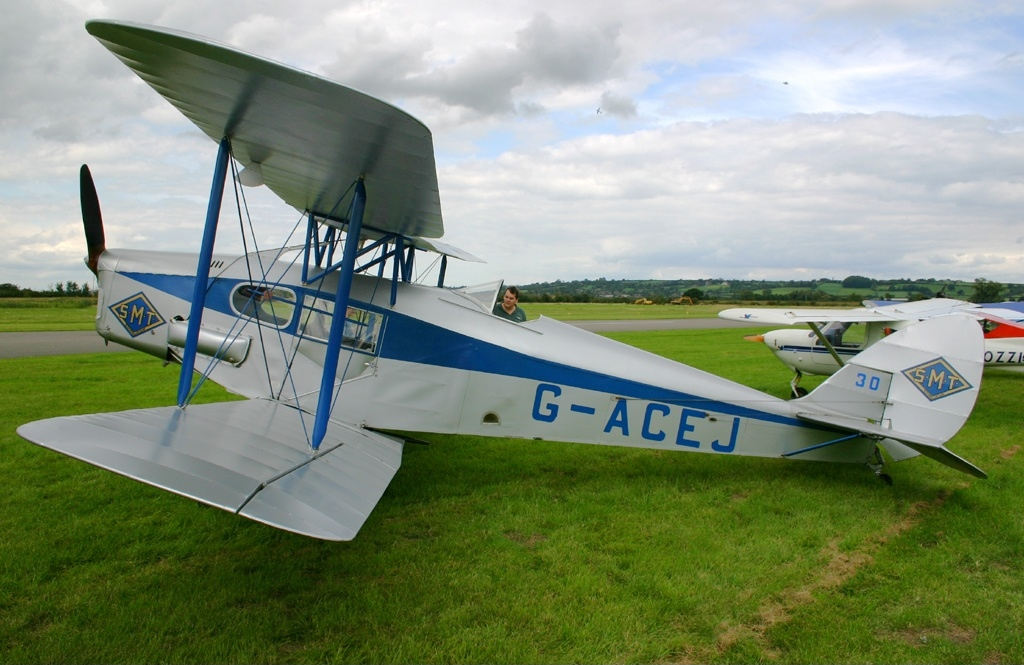
Fox Moth G-ACEJ of SMT restored in its original markings

SMT, in which the London and North Eastern Railway (LNER) held a stake, had itself been active in aviation; from July to October 1932 it had operated several aircraft which it used for route surveying and pleasure flights. It had also been granted licences to fly between Newcastle and the north of Scotland. Notwithstanding that, on 10 March 1933 (Note: This was just before Ted Fresson started Highland Airways, on 3 April.) Sword, with his wife Christina, founded their own airline, Midland & Scottish Air Ferries (M&SAF), with £20,000 capital. He is reported to have believed that "so long as the main-line railway routes are avoided there are air-service prospects in this small country of ours". His plans focused on over-water routes from Glasgow.

John Sword had already ordered several aircraft, the first to be delivered to his base at Glasgow's Renfrew Airport being De Havilland Fox Moth G-ACBZ, which arrived on 8 February. Airspeed Ferry G-ACBT came fresh from the manufacturer's factory in York on 12 February. (Note: The Ferry had been slightly delayed on its delivery flight in Edinburgh after the starboard wingtip and aileron were damaged.) (Note: Sword's deposit for it took the form of his 6½ litre Bentley motorcar, which was valued at £900. Airspeed sold it for £700.) Sword ordered a second Ferry and three more Fox Moths the same month – his total investment in aircraft costing £12,000.

He was also assembling his staff. He hired SMT's chief pilot Harold Malet and their chief engineer Sandy Jack. He also hired Johnny Rae (a De Havilland test pilot), Jimmy Orrell (an ex RAF fighter pilot, later to become chief test pilot of Avro), Michael Noel Mavrogordato (ex De Havilland) and Winnie Drinkwater, all qualified engineers and pilots. Drinkwater was an enthusiastic pilot and engineer, newly qualified and only nineteen years of age when Sword took her on, the world's first female commercial pilot. Her elder sister Mary was appointed receptionist and book-keeper, soon to become company secretary.

=== Operations ===
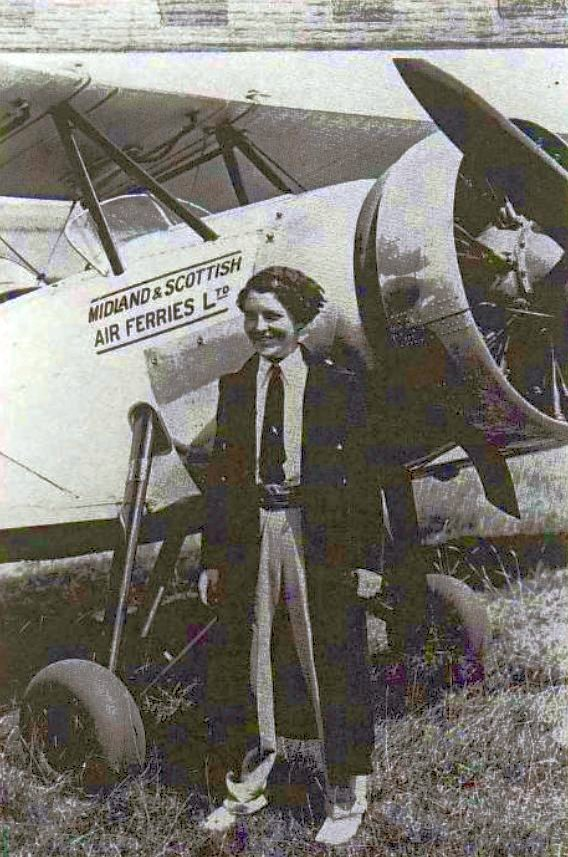
Winifred Drinkwater with the company's Avro 640 Cadet

Soon after the delivery of his first Airspeed Ferry, Sword put it to work on a temporary service linking Castle Bromwich Aerodrome with Liverpool (Hooton Park) and with London's Heston Airport in connection with the British Industries Fair from 19 February to 2 March 1933, an operation he repeated for the following year's Fair, again with the Ferries. The 1933 event took place before Sword's airline was formed.

The airline's first operational flight took place on 18 April 1933. Johnny Rae and Jimmy Orrell flew Dragons G-ACCU and G-ACCT from Renfrew to The Strath, a farmer's field near Campbeltown, (Note: This was to become part of RNAS Macrihanish, now Campbeltown Airport. It has Scotland's longest runway.) later known as Strathfield. They carried company officials, press, a photographer, and newspapers, and were welcomed by a delegation of local dignitaries. This was the start of daily services (except Sundays). On the 20th, a Fox Moth flown by Jimmy Rae went on from Campbeltown to take newspapers to Bowmore on Islay. Winifred Drinkwater flew the route on the 27th in Fox Moth G-ACBZ, the world's first commercial flight piloted by a woman. G-ACBT made the first Airspeed Ferry flight to Campbeltown on 11 May.

Sword ordered a new Dragon, G-ACCZ, with adaptations to carry stretchers, and told local hospitals of his plan. The aircraft arrived on 14 May, and the next day the first call came in to take a seriously ill fisherman from Bridgend, Islay, to Glasgow. The patient was accompanied by a Glaswegian nurse who was holidaying on Islay, and the trip was made successfully – Scotland's first official air ambulance flight.

The Campbeltown service was officially extended to Bridgend on Islay from 16 May 1933.

On 18 May a navy vessel, heavy cruiser HMS Frobisher, with a crew of 700 arrived in Campbeltown Loch and ordered bread from a bakery in Glasgow which was delivered by the evening flight – the airline's first freight operation.

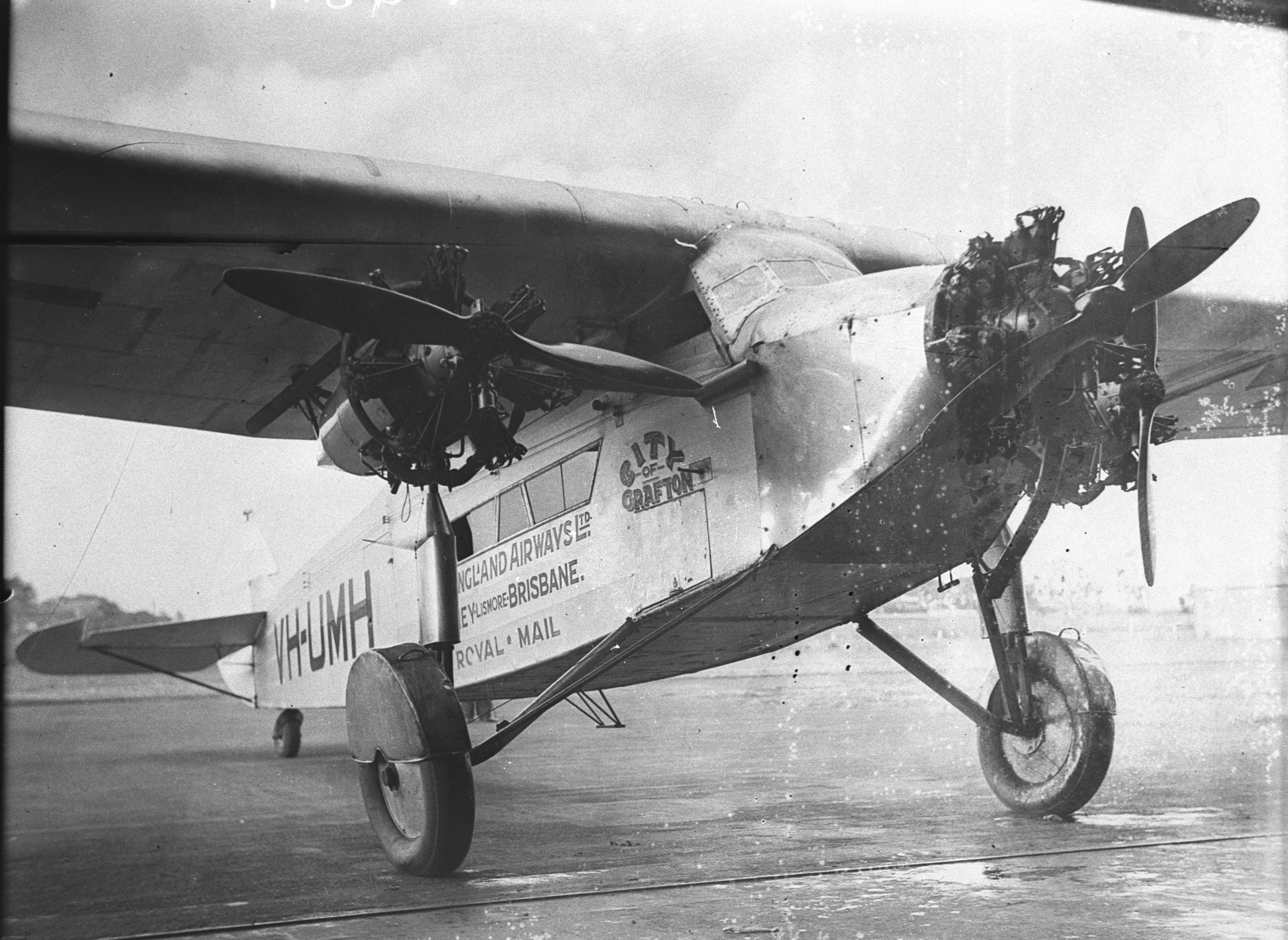
Avro 618 Ten similar to that used by M&SAF

Soon the Campbeltown service was also extended to Rothesay, and, on 31 May, to Belfast Aldergrove Airport, using the newly delivered Avro 618 Ten, G-ACGF, so called because it could carry eight passengers (plus a crew of two). This was Aldergrove's first sustained commercial route. The aircraft was later used on the direct routes from Glasgow to Belfast and to Liverpool. There were now two flights daily on these routes (except Sundays).

On 14 June 1933 Jimmy Orrell conducted a three-day survey of landing sites throughout the Hebrides in G-ACCZ, making the first landing on the beach at Traigh Mhòr, Barra, still the site of Barra's airport. However M&SAF never started services to Barra or any other Outer Hebrides islands.

Renfrew Airport was often closed by fog, so the airline used "The Meadow" airfield at Monkton, later known as Prestwick Airport, for diversions. When that happened, two Rolls-Royce Twenty cars were available to drive there to collect the passengers. If necessary, a converted REO Speed Wagon caravan could be taken there in which the airline crew or engineers could rest.

Winifred Drinkwater was kept busy, doing scheduled and air ambulance flights and charters, which included a monster-spotting flight over Loch Ness.

Sword now turned his attention away from Glasgow and the Inner Hebrides, and started operations from Liverpool, first across the River Mersey at Hooton Park, then at Speke Airport as soon as that opened. His first route from Liverpool was to Dublin, starting on 1 September 1933 using the Avro Ten. Operations also started at Blackpool's Stanley Park Aerodrome, from where he started a route to the Isle of Man, and operated pleasure flights, mainly with the Fox Moths. He also set up an engineering base there.

A popular charter operation operated by the Ferries at Stanley Park was for viewing the night-time Illuminations, with the airport lit by floodlight mounted on a lorry. An unusual episode occurred when a Ferry made a forced landing on the beach at Southport because of failure of an outer engine. Pilot Jimmy Orrell went to fly it back to Renfrew, and found that the ground engineer had removed the offending engine and stowed it in the cabin, to save the drag. Orrell flew the aircraft home in that condition with no problems.

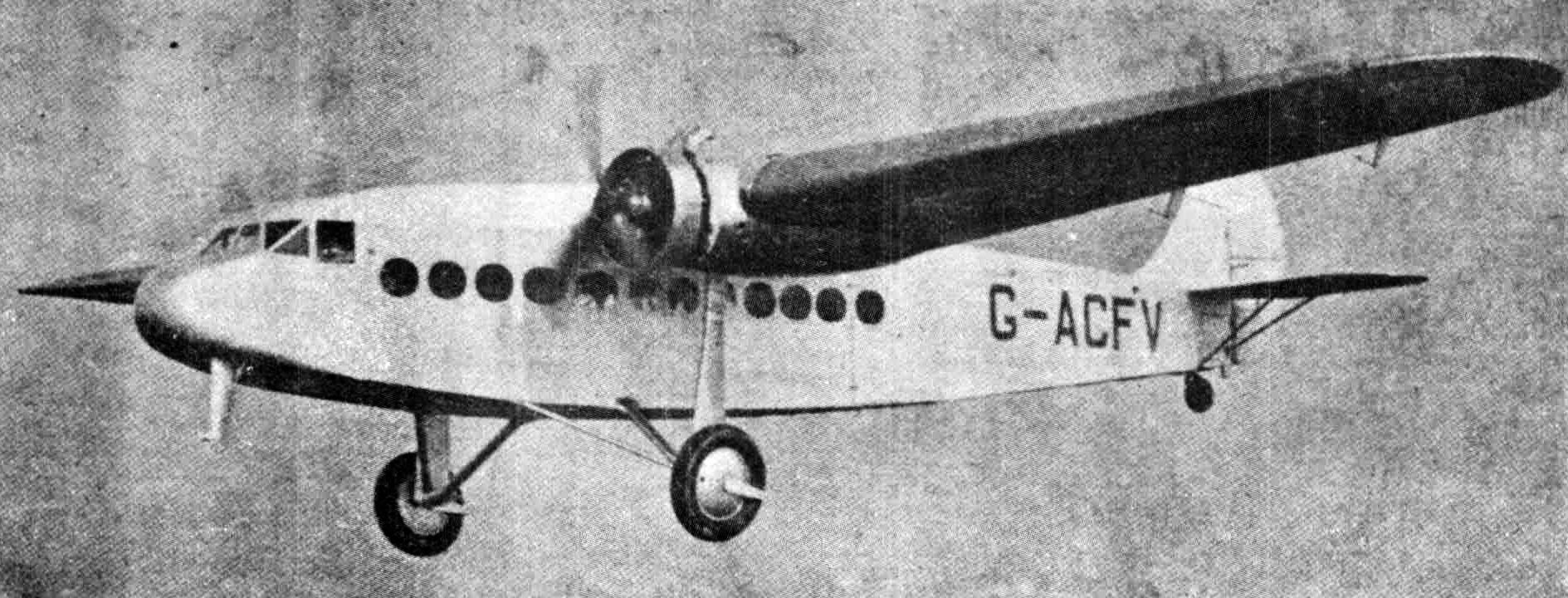
The Avro 642/2m G-ACFV during testing in March 1934

After an uneventful winter, Sword was planning for expansion in 1934. On 6 April, he took delivery of a new, unique aeroplane from Avro, the model 642/2m Eighteen G-ACFV. With a sixteen-passenger capacity, this was a big step for the airline, and Sword had arranged a suitable ceremony to announce it. On that day, he collected his new aircraft from Woodford Aerodrome and flew to Castle Bromwich to pick up some of the launching party en route to Speke. There, the aircraft was named Marchioness of Londonderry by the lady herself, accompanied by her husband, Lord Londonderry, who was the Secretary of State for Air. Also attending were Lt-Col Sir Francis Shelmerdine, the Director-General of Civil Aviation, and the Prime Minister, Ramsay MacDonald. After this prestigious launch, the Prime Minister and others were flown to Heston Aerodrome.

Sword was a friend of Ted Hillman, another bus operator who was running an airline, Hillman's Airways, from London's Romford airfield. They agreed that Sword should start a service from Glasgow to London via Liverpool, and on, with Hillman's, to Paris–Le Bourget Airport. Sword was apparently abandoning his intention to avoid competition with the railways. The service started on 9 April 1934, twice daily except Sundays, with the Avro 642 serving along with others of Sword's fleet. The Paris service could also be accessed through a service from Belfast via the Isle of Man to Liverpool.

=== Demise ===
All the airline's activity was going on while Sword was employed as a director with SMT. The other directors of SMT, some of whom were also directors of the newly formed Railway Air Services, with whom he was now blatantly competing, now decided that things had gone too far, and gave Sword an ultimatum that he should give up either his employment with SMT or his airline. He chose the latter. Other factors contributing to this decision may have been that Sword saw little prospect of making a profit from his venture, and the crash in June of the pride of his fleet, the Avro Eighteen, may have disheartened him.

Most of the routes were stopped on 14 July 1934, with no obvious attempt to sell the airline as a going concern, the aircraft being disposed of individually over the following months. On 4 September 1934 Sword joined Eric Gandar Dower, owner of Aberdeen Airways, in a flight in the latter's Short Scion from Renfrew to Campbeltown and Islay. Gandar Dower was possibly evaluating the route with a view to taking it over, but nothing came of it. The only remaining route, to Islay, was shut down on 30 September. Midland & Scottish Air Ferries Ltd went into voluntary liquidation in February 1938.

However Sword employed Charles Almond, an instructor with the Scottish Flying Club at Renfrew, to fly Dragon G-ACJS which was retained on stand-by to perform air ambulance flights until other arrangements could be made. The aircraft was sold to Northern & Scottish Airways on 7 January 1935 and they continued the ambulance service.

== Routes ==
From timetable dated 9 June 1934 (No Sunday services on any route)

- Glasgow (Renfrew) — Liverpool (Speke) — London (Romford) — Le Bourget (twice daily)
- Belfast (Aldergrove) — Isle of Man (Ronaldsway) — Liverpool — London — Le Bourget (twice daily)
- Blackpool (Stanley Park) — Liverpool (twice daily)
- Glasgow — Campbeltown (Strath Aerodrome) — Belfast (twice daily)
- Glasgow — Campbeltown — Islay (Duich Aerodrome) (daily)

Connections

- At London (Romford) with Hillman's Airways for Paris
- At Liverpool with K.L.M. to Hull, Rotterdam, Hanover and Berlin

== Fleet ==
Midland & Scottish Air Ferries fleet, 1933-4
| Type | Regstr'n | From | To | Fate | Notes (Note: All aircraft were registered to John C. Sword except where noted.) |
|---|---|---|---|---|---|
| Airspeed Ferry | G-ACBT | 21 December 1932 | 18 February 1941 | Scrapped | New. Never used again after M&SAF closed, stored Renfrew at start of war covered in tree branches to hide it from the Germans |
| Ferry | G-ACFB | 6 March 1933 | April 1936 | Sold | New. Sold to C.W.A. Scott's Flying Display, Impressed 18 February 1941 as DJ715 Taken by road to Stoke, used by No 1037 Sqn ATC |
| Avro 618 Ten | G-ACGF | 3 May 1933 | December 1946 | Cancelled | New M&SAF. Cancelled |
| Avro 640 Cadet | G-ACFX | 12 April 1933 | 7 January 1936 | Sold abroad | Three-seater version for pleasure flights. New M&SAF. To Malaya as VR-RAJ |
| Avro 643 Cadet | G-ACIH | 9 March 1933 | 22 March 1937 | Sold abroad | New. To Ireland as EI-ALU. Being restored? |
| Avro 642/2m Eighteen | G-ACFV | 6 April 1934 | 4 June 1934 | Crashed | New M&SAF. Wrecked at Cerrig-y-Druidion, Merioneth, Wales. Rebuilt May 1935 for Commercial Air Hire. Sold abroad as VH-UXD |
| De Havilland DH.60GIII; Moth Major | G-ACGD | 21 April 1933 | December 1934 | Sold | Ex A Fraser (Renfrew), M&SAF. Based at Stanley Park. To Blackpool & Fylde Aero Club. Crashed Broad Law 25 July 1936 |
| De Havilland DH.83; Fox Moth | G-ACBZ | 8 February 1933 | 30 September 1934 | Sold | New. Sold to Australia as VH-UZD Crashed New Guinea 30 October 1949 |
| Fox Moth | G-ACCB | 13 March 1933 | 30 September 1934 | Sold | New. Based at Blackpool. Crashed Blackpool 6 August 1934, repaired. Sold to Giro Aviation. Ditched in sea off Southport 25 September 1956. Reg restored 23 March 1988. On long-term rebuild |
| Fox Moth | G-ACCT | 8 March 1933 | 30 December 1936 | Sold | New. Leased to Highland Airways 3 July 1933 – 17 July 1933 to replace crashed Monospar G-ACEW. Sold to Australia as VH-ABU, Air Force A41-1, VH-GAV |
| Fox Moth | G-ACCU | 13 February 1933 | 30 December 1936 | Sold | New. Sold to Australia at VH-UZC, Air Force A41-4 Crashed |
| De Havilland DH.84; Dragon 1 | G-ACCZ | February 1933 | | Sold | New M&SAF. To Crilly Airways. Impressed as AW154 1 July 1940. Scrapped December 1942 |
| Dragon 1 | G-ACDL | February 1933 | | Sold | New M&SAF. To Hon Mrs Victor Bruce. Sold abroad August 1936 |
| Dragon 1 | G-ACDN | 29 May 1933 | 20 May 1937 | Sold | To Commercial Air Hire Ltd. Impressed as AW170 August 1940 |
| Dragon 1 | G-ACJS | 2 August 1933 | 7 January 1935 | Sold | New M&SAF. To Northern & Scottish Airways. Withdrawn from use November 1936 |
| Spartan Arrow | G-AAWZ | 10 April 1933 | 22 February 1935 | Sold | Ex Cirrus-Hermes Engineering, with Hermes II engine. To Hon Brian Lewis, t/a Brian Lewis & Co. Scrapped in WWII |

Livery consisted of white overall with red markings, struts, and wheel spats. The Dragons also had red engine nacelles. The font and styling of the company name varied between aircraft.

== Accidents and incidents ==
Avro Eighteen G-ACFV and De Havilland Fox Moth G-ACCB were involved in accidents or incidents while with M&SAF – see Fleet list above.

== See also ==
There is a film of M&SAF's Airspeed Ferry G-ACBT and Avro Ten G-ACGF, and others, giving pleasure rides at the Scottish Flying Club Pageant at Renfrew during the Summer of 1933.

- List of defunct airlines of the United Kingdom

== Bibliography ==
- Davies, R. E. G. (2005). British Airways: An airline and its aircraft Volume 1: 1919 - 1939. McLean, Virginia, USA: Paladwr Press. ISBN 1-888962-24-0.
- Jackson, A. J.; Jackson, R. T. (1990). Avro Aircraft since 1908 (2nd ed.). London, UK: Putnam Aeronautical Books. ISBN 0-85177-834-8.
- Webster, Jack (1994). The Flying Scots. Glasgow: The Glasgow Royal Concert Hall. ISBN 0-9522174-2-2.
