= 1933 Imperial Airways Diksmuide crash =

Aircraft crash near Diksmuide, Belgium

City of Liverpool
Accident
- Date: 28 March 1933
- Summary: Fire, suspected sabotage
- Site: Near Diksmuide, Belgium; 51.0333°N 2.8667°E

Aircraft
- Aircraft type: Armstrong Whitworth Argosy II
- Aircraft name: City of Liverpool
- Operator: Imperial Airways
- Registration: G-AACI
- Flight origin: Haren Airport
- Destination: Croydon Airport
- Passengers: 12
- Crew: 3
- Fatalities: 15
- Survivors: 0

On 28 March 1933, an Armstrong Whitworth Argosy II passenger aircraft, named City of Liverpool and operated by British airline Imperial Airways, crashed near Diksmuide, Belgium, after suffering an onboard fire; all fifteen people aboard were killed, making it the deadliest accident in the history of British civil aviation to that time. It has been suggested that this was the first airliner ever lost to sabotage, and in the immediate aftermath, suspicion centred on one passenger, Albert Voss, who seemingly jumped from the aircraft before it crashed.

== Accident ==
The aircraft was employed on Imperial's regular London–Brussels–Cologne route, which it had flown for the previous five years. On this leg of the journey the plane was travelling from Brussels to London, a route which would take it north from Brussels heading over Flanders before crossing the coast for the 50-mile (80 km) flight across the English Channel and then making the brief traverse over the Kent countryside to land at Croydon Airport in Surrey. The two-hour journey began, slightly delayed, just after 12:30 pm.

While flying over the fields of northern Belgium, the plane was seen by onlookers to catch fire before losing altitude and plunging into the ground. As the aircraft began its descent, a passenger was seen to exit the aeroplane and fall to earth without a parachute. He was later identified as Albert Voss, a German who had emigrated to the United Kingdom, where he practised as a dentist in Manchester. At approximately 200 feet (60 m), the aircraft split into two sections that hit the ground separately, instantly killing all those still on board, including Voss' niece Lottie.

== Investigation and inquest ==
The subsequent investigation found that the fire had started towards the rear of the plane, in either the lavatory or the luggage area at the back of the cabin. No items recovered from the front portion of the wreckage showed any evidence of fire damage before the impact, nor was there any evidence of fire in the engines or fuel systems. The investigators narrowed the cause down to the firing of some combustible substance, either accidentally by a passenger or crew member or through vibration or some other natural occurrence, or deliberately by bombing. At the request of investigators from the Air Ministry, Voss' funeral was delayed pending inquiries.

At the inquest into Albert Voss's death at least one witness, his estranged brother, accused him of being culpable, claiming that Voss's business trips to the continent to buy anesthetics masked a lucrative sideline in drug smuggling. This rumor had followed Voss for some time before his death and was alleged to have been the subject of investigations by the Metropolitan Police. Voss, according to his brother, was travelling aboard the aircraft together with his niece, and they were aware that the authorities were on to them. Under this theory, Voss sought to escape from the authorities by destroying the aircraft using various flammable substances, to which his work gave him easy access, and then bailing out in the confused circumstances, hoping that in the aftermath no one would notice one fewer body than there should have been. The flight was 36 minutes behind schedule when the plane took off; had the plane taken off on time and the fire started at the same point during the flight, the City of Liverpool would have crashed into the English Channel, likely complicating any forensic recovery operations. A postmortem ordered by the coroner showed that, other than some minor burns, Voss was unharmed before he exited the aircraft. The inquest jury returned an open verdict – indicating that they believed his death may not have been accidental, but that they were unable, on the evidence before them, to come to a definite conclusion – rather than the verdict of accidental death the coroner attempted to direct them towards.
