= F430 =

F430 may refer to:

- Cofactor F430, F_{430}, the prosthetic group of the enzyme methyl coenzyme M reductase
- Farman F.430, a 1930s French light transport aircraft designed and built by Farman Aviation Works
- Ferrari F430, a supercar produced by Italian automaker Ferrari from 2004 to 2009
- F430, French cloud rap band
