= F420 =

F420 may refer to:

- Farman F.420, a French multi-role fighter class introduced in 1934
- Coenzyme F420, a coenzyme involved in redox reactions in methanogens
- HMNZS Tutira (F420), a 1948 Loch class frigate of the Royal New Zealand Navy
