= Guillemin JG.40 =

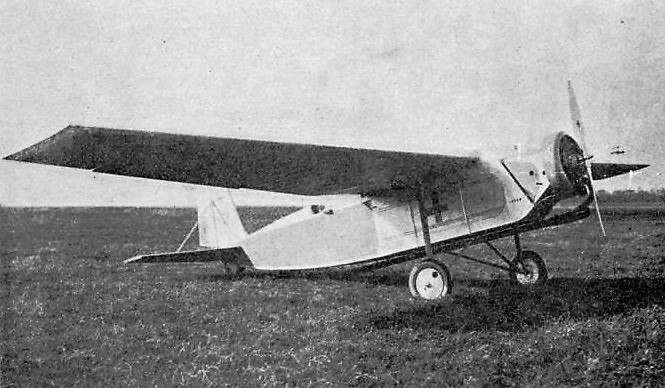

General information
- Type: Military air ambulance
- National origin: France
- Manufacturer: Blériot Aéronautique
- Designer: J. Guillemin
- Number built: 2

History
- First flight: 2 October 1930

The Guillemin JG.40 was designed and built to meet a French government requirement for a small air ambulance capable of operating in the colonies. Two were completed and performed well but the JG.40 did not reach production.

== Design ==
Around 1930 there was a French interest in small aircraft capable of evacuating a single ill or wounded patient to hospital from roughly prepared sites in the colonies. The Lorraine-Hanriot LH.21S and the Potez 42 were examples of the category and the Guillemin JG.40 was another. They posed several design challenges, principally around the need for a large, clear patient enclosure with easy ground access from a stretcher. Guillemin, who had worked at Hanriot from 1922 to 1929, was familiar with the problems.

The Guillimen JG.40 was a high wing cantilever monoplane, a configuration which offered easy access to the fuselage sides. A cockpit well behind the trailing edge allowed the patient's compartment to be placed over the centre of gravity, where varying loads would least affect the trim. The wings were trapezoidal in plan and were in three parts, with a centre-section mounted on top of the fuselage and slightly hollowed out above to improve the field of view from the cockpit. Outboard the wing section thinned from below to produce mild dihedral. The wings were built around two wooden box spars, with wooden ribs and plywood covering, using established glue and nail techniques suited to the high humidity and temperatures of some French colonies.

Externally, the fuselage of the JG.40 was a simple rectangular section, deep, dural-skinned box, which only tapered significantly in profile just before the engine. The first example to fly was powered by a nine-cylinder Salmson 9Nc radial and the second, designated JG.41, by a five-cylinder Lorraine 5Pc. Both engines produced about 89 kW (120 hp) and had narrow chord Townend ring cowlings. Much of the underlying fuselage structure was formed from dural tube girders but under the wing there were two transverse dural box frames, open on the starboard side or C-form. These joined the fuselage to the two wing spars and formed undercarriage attachment points, whilst leaving access to the space for a patient, 2,250 mm (7 ft 5 in) long, 580 mm (1 ft 11 in) high and 250 mm (9.8 in) wide. The metal door to this space was hinged from below and had telescopic stays which held it horizontal when open, easing the move from stretcher to the adjustable bed within. Engine exhaust gases were carefully directed down the port side, away from the patient's door, via a cooling silencer which passed the gases into a 4.0 m (13 ft 1 in) outlet. The pilot's open cockpit was midway between the trailing edge of the wing and the tail, with long fairings ahead and behind him. The pilot could monitor his patient's condition in flight as the partition between them was transparent. In contrast to the rest of the fuselage, the rear sides were rapidly detachable leatherette panels.

The tail unit was conventional, with trapezoidal horizontal and vertical surfaces. The tailplane was mounted at mid-fuselage and was braced to the fin by a single strut on each side. The control surfaces were unbalanced and the bottom of the rudder was cropped to allow elevator movement. The JG.40 had fixed landing gear, with split axles and drag struts hinged from the central fuselage underside and with vertical Messier oleo-legs from the forward wing spars. The mainwheels had hydraulic brakes. The castoring tailwheel was also on an oleo strut.

== Development ==
The Salmson powered JG.40 made its first flight on 2 October 1930. It had been built by Bleriot so appeared on their stand at the 12th Paris Salon held in December 1930. The JG.41 flew in January 1931.

Comparative testing by military pilots of the three air-ambulances was under way by March 1931. They were later joined by the Guillemin second prototype with its Lorraine engine. In November they reported that their tests of the JG.40 were ended, that it had performed excellently and was the best aircraft of the three. There were hopes that it would receive a production order and become a common sight across the French colonies. One of the JG.40s was damaged in February 1932; in December the second example was at Villacoublay for further tests. By June these had been concluded "brilliantly" and the aircraft was flown to a conference on Medical aviation at Madrid.

In September 1933 a JG.40 took part in the Tour de France des avions prototypes but suffered undercarriage damage on the fifth day.

Despite its excellent test results the Guillemin JG.40 did not reach production and the small air-ambulance role was filled by the later and more powerful Bloch MB.81.

By April 1936 the JG.40 was flying with a 130 kW (175 hp) Salmson 9Nd nine-cylinder radial, which much improved performance. Maximum speed was raised to 200 km/h (120 mph; 110 kn) at 2,000 m (6,600 ft), ceiling to 7,000 m (23,000 ft) and range to 600 km (370 mi). It was redesignated as the JG.43. By July it was being officially tested at Villacoublay.

== Variants ==
JG.40
First prototype, 89 kW (120 hp) Salmson 9Nc.
JG.41
Second prototype, 89 kW (120 hp) Lorraine 5Pc, otherwise unchanged
JG.42
As second prototype.
JG.43
With a 130 kW (175 hp) Salmson 9Nd

== Specifications (JG.40) ==
Data from General: L'Aéronautique December 1930 Performance: Les Ailes December 1930

General characteristics

- Crew: one
- Capacity: one patient
- Length: 7.70 m (25 ft 3 in)
- Wingspan: 13.50 m (44 ft 3 in)
- Height: 3.50 m (11 ft 6 in)
- Wing area: 25 m^{2} (270 sq ft)
- Empty weight: 680 kg (1,499 lb)
- Gross weight: 980 kg (2,161 lb)
- Powerplant: 1 × Salmson 9Nc 9-cylinder radial, 89 kW (120 hp)
- Propellers: 2-bladed

Performance

- Maximum speed: 150 km/h (93 mph, 81 kn) at 2,500 m (8,200 ft)
- Range: 500 km (310 mi, 270 nmi)
- Service ceiling: 5,000 m (16,000 ft)
