= H46 =

H46 may refer to:

- Boeing Vertol H-46 Sea Knight, an American helicopter
- Hanriot H.46 Styx, a French aircraft
- HMS Belmont (H46), a Royal Navy Clemson-class destroyer
