= Hanriot H.46 Styx =

French, single-engined, parasol wing aircraft

H.46 Styx
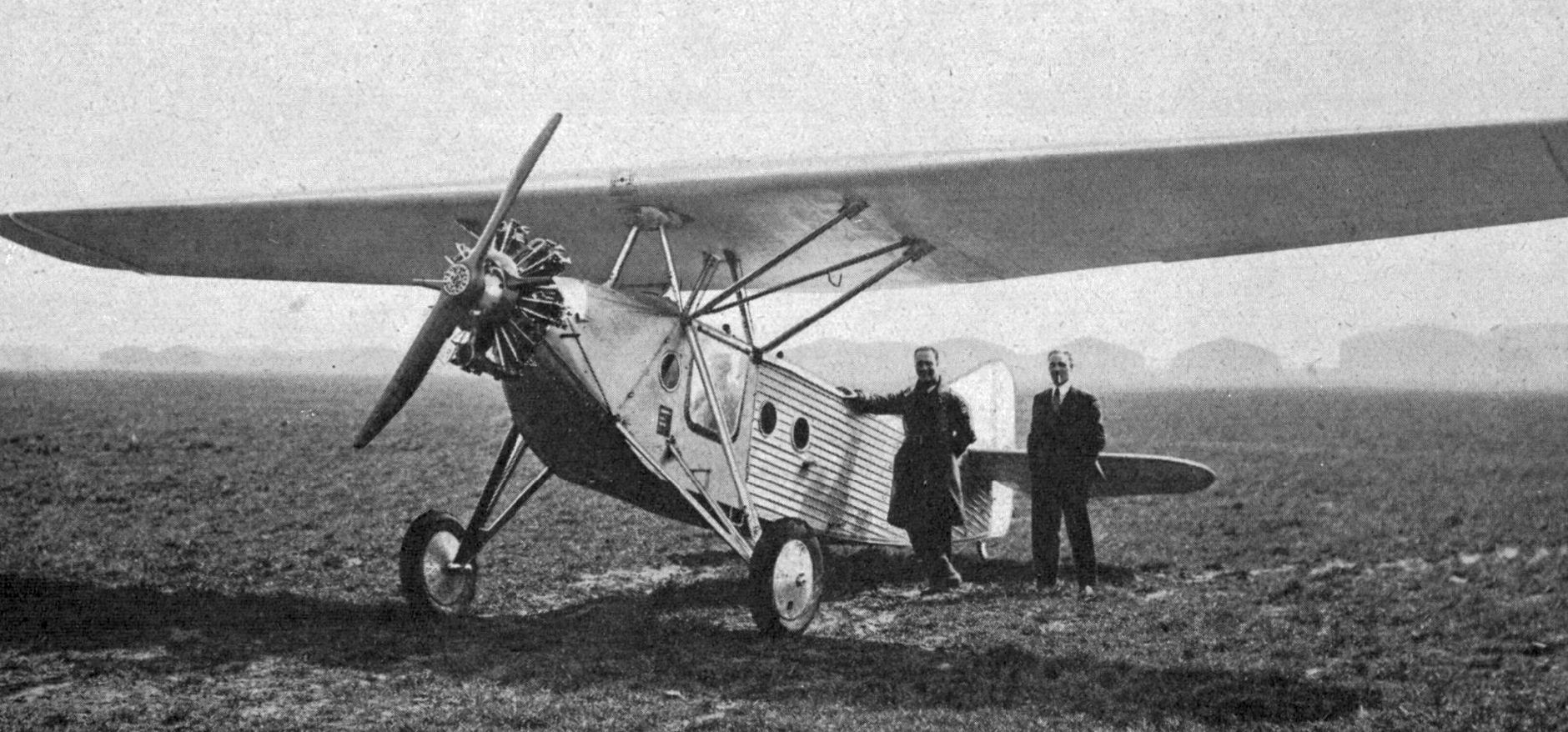

General information
- Type: Trainer, ambulance and liaison aircraft
- National origin: France
- Manufacturer: Aéroplanes Hanriot et Cie.

History
- First flight: April 1928
- Developed into: Lorraine-Hanriot LH.21S

The Hanriot H.46 Styx was a French, single-engined, parasol wing aircraft which could equally be configured for training, liaison or ambulance roles; in the latter form it was able to accept a patient on a stretcher. Several different engines were fitted and flown but the type did not reach production.

== Design and development ==
The Styx had a one piece parasol wing with a constant chord centre-section, straight-tapered outer parts and blunt tips. Thick centrally, it thinned outwards from below beyond, giving light dihedral overall. Its plywood-covered ailerons were towards the tips, which could be adjusted on the ground for trimming. The ply-covered wing was built around twin wooden spars and was supported centrally, well above the fuselage, on a fore and aft pair of steel inverted V-struts to those spars. Outward leaning N-struts ran similarly from the fuselage to the wing struts at the ends of the centre-section.

The engine mounting was designed so that the Styx could be powered with a variety of engines in the 71–134 kW (95–180 hp) range. Five different engine types (and one sub-type) were fitted to Styx variants and are listed below. Early photos show the seven-cylinder Salmson 7Ac, 71 kW (95 hp) radial engine, mounted with its cylinders uncowled. The main accessories, attached to the frame immediately behind the engine, could be reached via cowling side doors. Its fuel tank was in the wing. Behind a sloping firewall the fuselage was all-metal and of rectangular section, its duralumin tube frame covered with long, narrow dural strips placed horizontally, edge-to-edge. The pilot's cockpit was open and placed under the wing with a circular window forward of the port-side cockpit door and at mid-fuselage height to provide a downward view.

Behind the cockpit the top of the fuselage was slightly domed. When the Styx was configured as a trainer, a forward section of this covering was removed and a second seat, dual controls and a windscreen were fitted. The main flight instruments were mounted under the wing leading edge so they could be seen from both cockpits. The pupil's downward view was through a pair of circular windows on each side. A partition separated him from the instructor and his access was by an upward-hinged door on the starboard side which gave access to the full length of the space behind the primary cockpit. Alternatively, the roof could be retained and the clear, ventilated compartment space used to carry a stretcher, supported above the floor on oleo struts and loaded via the side door.

The tail of the Styx was conventional, with horizontal surfaces mounted on top of the fuselage. They had ply-covered dural frames and were tapered in plan with rounded tips. The tailplane angle of incidence was ground-adjustable but the elevators were unbalanced. A broad, slightly angular, manually adjustable fin carried a tall, narrow unbalanced rudder which extended down to the keel, operating in a small elevator cut-out. These vertical surfaces were also dural-framed but were fabric covered.

The undercarriage of the Styx was fixed, with a wide track, large wheels and no cross-axle, making it suitable for roughly prepared landing fields. Each mainwheel was mounted on a V-strut hinged on the lower fuselage frame with a single, shock absorbing oleo landing leg to the upper frame. Undercarriage legs and struts were enclosed in dural fairings. There was a steel-shod, castoring, rubber cord sprung tailskid.

== Operational history ==
The prototype H.46, powered by the Salmson 7A engine, first flew in April 1928. Over the next eighteen months variants with other engines, summarised below, were flown. It is not known if any were new airframes, as the H.36 was designed for easy engine changes.

The 75 kW (100 hp), Lorraine 5Pa-engined H.461 was on display, unflown, at the Paris Salon which opened on 29 June 1928. (Note: L'Année Aéronautique refers to it as the H.46 and Flight as the H.460) The most powerful variant, the Hispano-powered H.465, took part in a meeting of air ambulance aircraft held in May 1929 and the H.463, with its uprated Lorraine 5Pc engine was flying at Villacoublay in July 1929.

== Variants ==
H.46(0)
7-cylinder Salmson 7Ac, 71 kW (95 hp) radial engine. First flown April 1928.
H.461
5-cylinder Lorraine 5Pa, 75 kW (100 hp) radial engine. First flown November 1928.
H.462
9-cylinder Salmson 9Ac, 89 kW (120 hp) radial engine. First flown June 1928.
H.463
5-cylinder Lorraine 5Pc, 89 kW (120 hp) radial engine. Flying by July 1929.
H.464
9-cylinder Clerget 9B, 97 kW (130 hp) rotary engine. First flown 1929.
H.465
V-8 Hispano-Suiza 8Ab 130 kW (180 hp). First flown March 1929.

== Specifications (H.462) ==
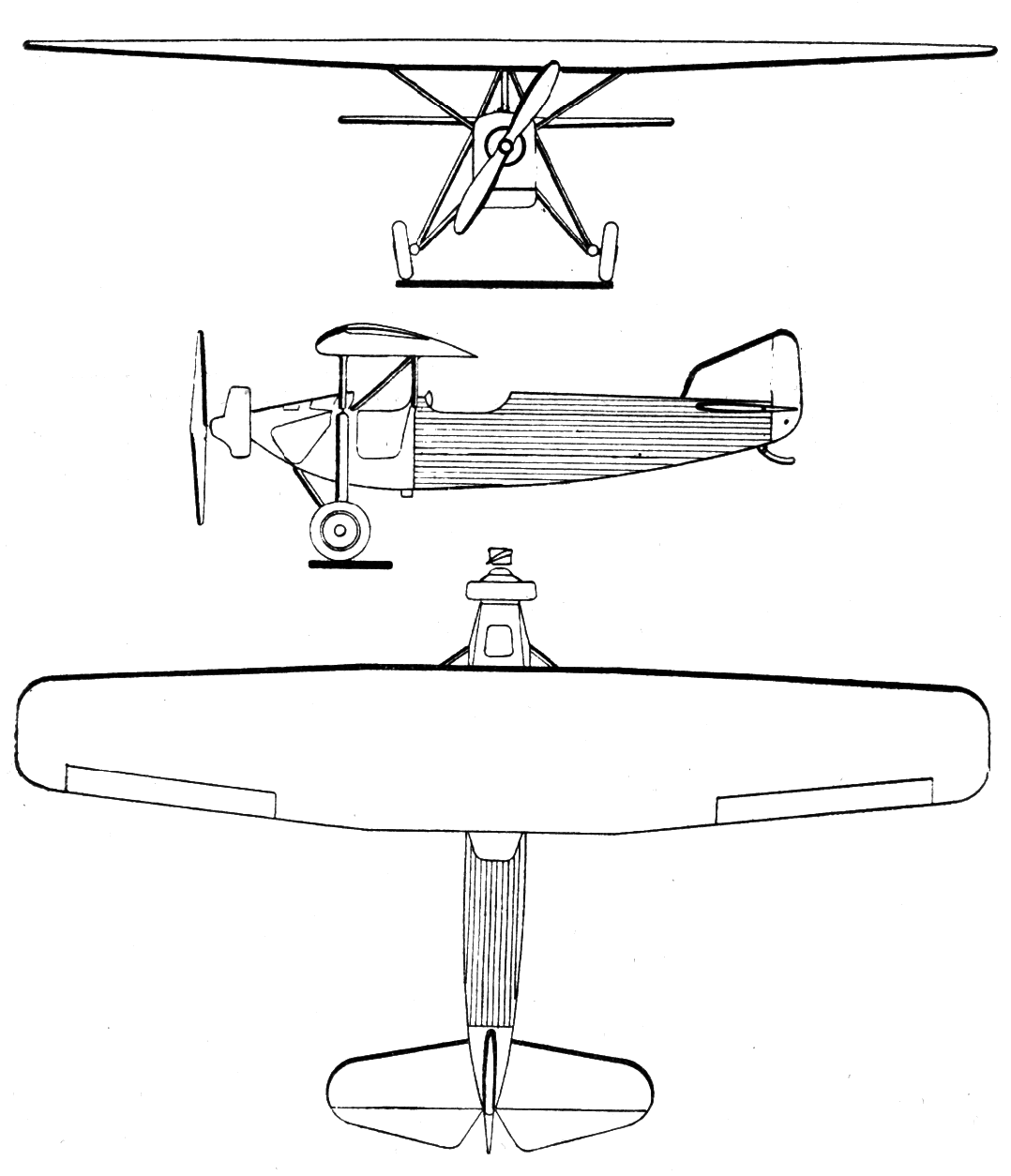
Hanriot H.46 3-view drawing from Les Ailes July 13, 1928

Data from Les Ailes, July 1928

General characteristics

- Crew: One
- Capacity: One pupil or patient
- Length: 7.50 m (24 ft 7 in)
- Wingspan: 12.45 m (40 ft 10 in)
- Height: 3.0 m (9 ft 10 in)
- Wing area: 23 m^{2} (250 sq ft)
- Gross weight: 900 kg (1,984 lb)
- Powerplant: 1 × Salmson 9AC 9-cylinder air-cooled radial, 89 kW (120 hp)
- Propellers: 2-bladed

Performance

- Maximum speed: 150 km/h (93 mph, 81 kn) at ground level
- Endurance: 3 hr
- Time to altitude: 17 m to 2,000 m (6,600 ft)
