= SAB-SEMA 10 =

1930s French trainer aircraft

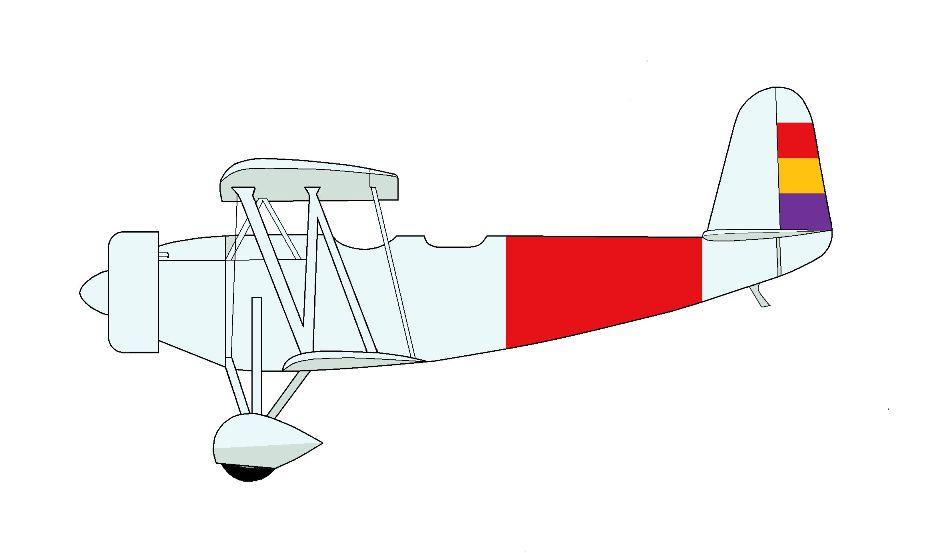
- SAB-SEMA 12

General information
- Type: Intermediate trainer
- National origin: France
- Manufacturer: Société Aérienne Bordelaise (SAB)
- Designer: Societé d'Etudes de Materiel d'Aviation (SEMA)
- Number built: 1

History
- First flight: c.1933

The SAB-SEMA 10 was a single-engine advanced trainer, designed and built in France as the SEMA 10, in the 1930s. It failed to win a French production contract and only one was built. Re-engined, modified and redesignated SAB-SEMA 12, it served with the Spanish Republican Air Force at the beginning of the Spanish Civil War.

== Design and development ==
The SAB-SEMA 10 was designed by the Societé d'Etudes de Materiel d'Aviation (SEMA) and built by the Société Aérienne Bordelaise (SAB) to compete for a 1933 French government contract for an intermediate and advanced military trainer. It was a conventional biplane, metal framed and fabric covered, powered by a 240 hp (180 kW) Lorraine 7Mc Mizar seven-cylinder radial engine. Instructor and pupil occupied open tandem cockpits.

The SAB-SEMA 10 failed to gain a production contract when the competition was won by the Romano R.82. It was then re-engined with a more powerful 300 hp (224 kW) Lorraine 9Na Algol nine-cylinder radial with a Townend ring cowling. At the same time wing and tail modifications were made and the aircraft redesignated the SAB-SEMA 12. This was a single-bay biplane with N-form interplane struts. The lower wing had a smaller chord than the upper one but both carried ailerons, externally connected. The fuselage was flat sided and the tailplane was mounted on top of it. The fin was tall and the rudder extended to the bottom of the fuselage, moving between separate elevators. It had a conventional undercarriage with mainwheels in spats.

== Operational history ==
In October 1936 the SAB-SEMA 12 was sold to the Spanish Republican Air Force for use as a trainer for military pilots in the Spanish Civil War. It was based at the Los Alcázares flying school in Murcia.

== Variants ==
SAB-SEMA 10

- Competitor for trainer contract, with Lorraine 7M Mizar engine.

SAB-SEMA 12

- Modified SAB-SEMA 10 with Lorraine 9Na Algol engine and wing and tail modifications.

== Operators ==
Spain

- Spanish Republican Air Force

== Specifications (SAB-SEMA-12) ==
Data from Howson

General characteristics

- Crew: two
- Length: 6.9 m (22 ft 8 in)
- Wingspan: 8.75 m (28 ft 8 in)
- Height: 2.82 m (9 ft 3 in)
- Empty weight: 1,126 kg (2,482 lb)
- Gross weight: 1,589 kg (3,503 lb)
- Powerplant: 1 × Lorraine 9Na Algol 9-cylinder radial, 221 kW (296 hp)
- Propellers: 3-bladed

Performance

- Maximum speed: 260 km/h (160 mph, 140 kn)
- Range: 575 km (357 mi, 310 nmi)
- Service ceiling: 6,000 m (20,000 ft)
- Time to altitude: 5 min to 1,000 m (3,300 ft)

Armament

- Guns: Twin machine guns in rear cockpit.

== See also ==
Aircraft of comparable role, configuration, and era

- Bücker Bü 133

Related lists

- List of aircraft of the Spanish Republican Air Force
- List of Interwar military aircraft
