= SAB DB-80 =

1930s French transport aircraft

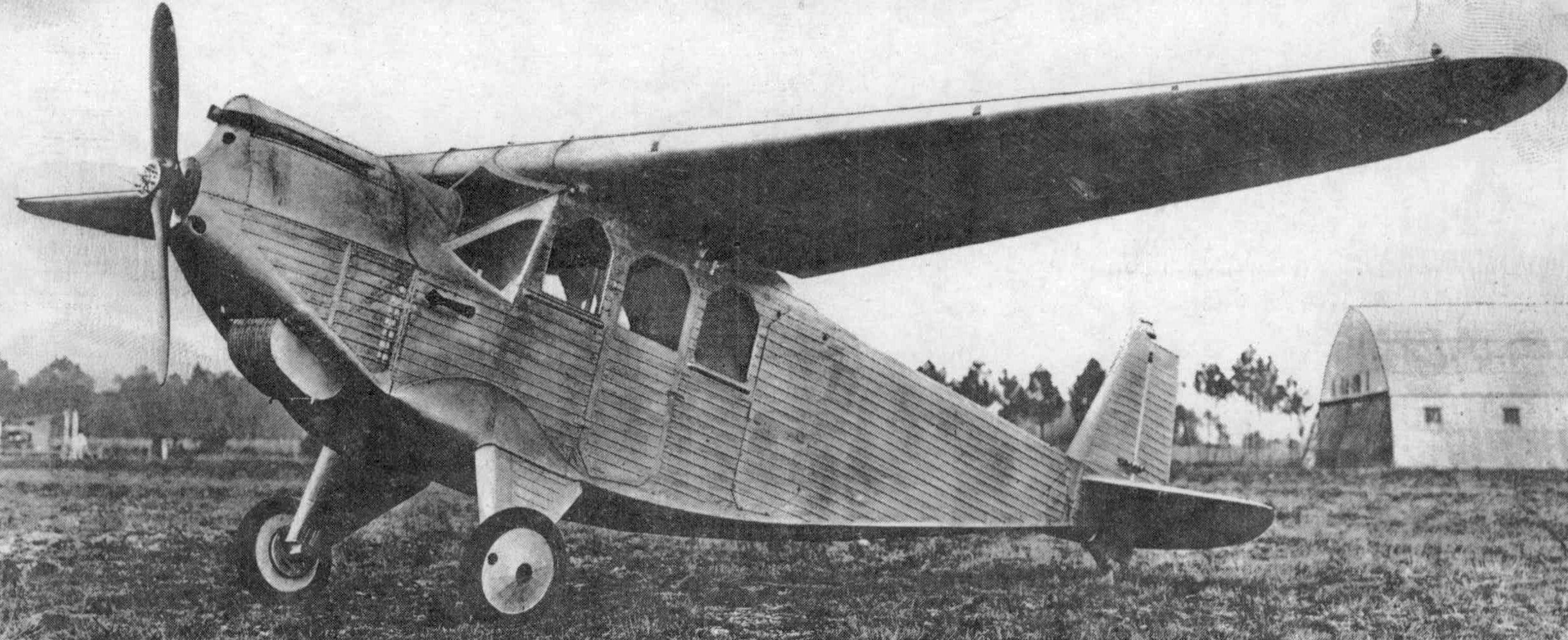

General information
- Type: Postal and two passenger transport aircraft
- National origin: France
- Manufacturer: Société Aérienne Bordelaise (SAB)
- Number built: 2

History
- First flight: 27 June 1930

The SAB DB-80 and SAB DB-81 were single-engine, all-metal French light transports aimed at the air mail market whilst carrying two passengers. Identical apart from their engines, they flew in mid-1930.

== Design ==
In 1929 Dyle and Bacalan were reformed as Société Aérienne Bordelaise (SAB) who continued to work on its predecessor's designs, distinguished by their DB numbering as well as on their own, which had AB numbers. The DB-80 originated with Dyle and Bacalan but was not flown until 1930, built by SAB. It was Dyle and Bacalan's last design and a small aircraft by their standards but maintained their all-metal tradition.

The DB-80 was aimed at the airmail market and was a single-engine, high-wing aircraft giving easy access by two port-side doors to a well-lit cabin with two passenger seats and to a separate mail compartment behind them. The pilot sat ahead of the passengers under the wing leading edge. Two differently engined versions were built: the DB-80 had a 100 hp (75 kW) Hispano-Suiza 6P six-cylinder, upright water-cooled inline and the DB-81 a 120 hp (89 kW) Lorraine 5Pc five-cylinder radial engine. The latter was mounted on a hinged frame for easy servicing. The Hispano engined had a Lamblin radiator on the fuselage underside.

The fuselage was built around four longerons, with rectangular frames and covered in longitudinally ribbed duralumin. Its underside was smoothly bellied, its upper side flat. In plan its taper was delayed until aft of the cabin. Its empennage was conventional, with a straight-tapered, blunt-topped fin and unbalanced rudder, the latter cut away at its base to allow for movement of the one-piece elevator mounted on a triangular tailplane at mid-fuselage height. Like the fuselage, all the tail surfaces were covered with ribbed duralumin.

The DB-80 had a fixed, tailwheel undercarriage with track of 1.90 m (75 in). The mainwheels were independently mounted and fitted with brakes. Each axle was mounted at the lower vertex of a triangular box acting as a cantilever leg, with its upper side hinged from the fuselage longerons. The strengthened forward edge of the structure extended above the hinge and connected to an elastic block housed in a reinforced transverse beam which passed under the cockpit, incorporating shock absorbers.

The DB-80's high, cantilever wing was unusual both in its construction and high aspect ratio of 9. In plan it was straight tapered on both edges but with semi-elliptical tips curved particularly on the trailing edges, where its ailerons were full span and broad. The wing was built around three spars, rather than the traditional one or two, and the detail of their caps or flanges, rather than the shape of the longitudinal braces or ribs, determined the airfoil profile. A similar but not identical wing structure was used on the Dyle et Bacalan DB-20.

== Development ==
In late March 1930 the DB-80's test flights were awaiting better weather; a month later tests were underway but the first flight did not take place until 27 June 1930. The Lorraine powered DB-81 flew in August, after which testing of the pair continued successfully though interrupted by SAB test pilot Charles Deschamps' absence at Villacoublay for official trials of the DB-20. In October the DB-80 was re-engined with a Lorraine and renamed DB-81.

There is no record of any further examples being built nor of measured performance figures.

== Variants ==
DB-80
100 hp (75 kW) Hispano-Suiza 6P upright six cylinder, water-cooled inline engine. Re-engined with Lorraine in October 1930, becoming second DB-81. One built.
DB-81
120 hp (89 kW) Lorraine 5Pc five cylinder radial engine and 750 mm (29.5 in) shorter. One built.

== Specifications (DB-81) ==
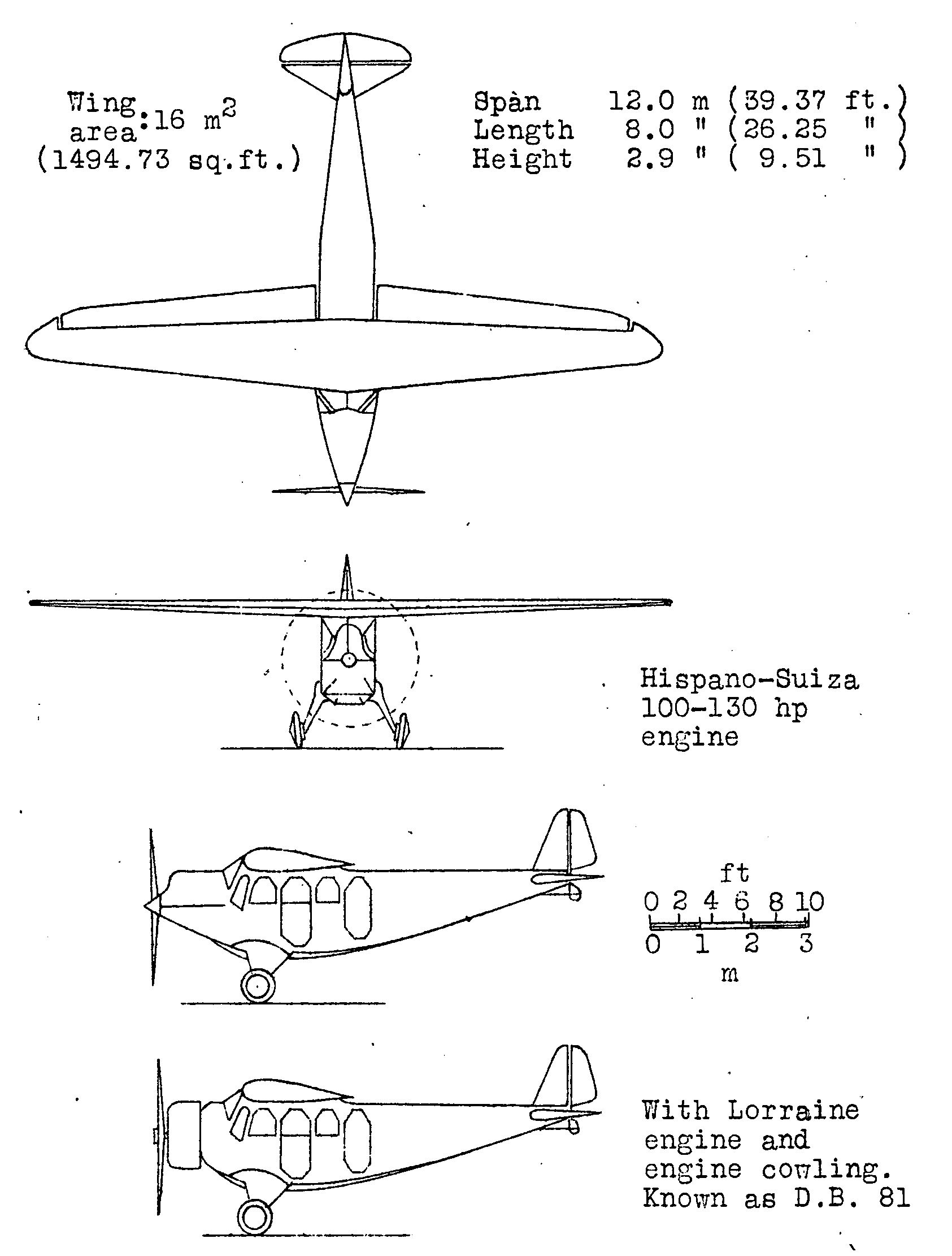
Dyle et Bacalan DB-80 3-view drawing from NACA Aircraft Circular No.123

Data from NACA Aircraft Circular no.123 (1930) Performance figures calculated

General characteristics

- Crew: One pilot
- Capacity: Two passengers
- Length: 8 m (26 ft 3 in)
- Wingspan: 12 m (39 ft 4 in)
- Height: 2.90 m (9 ft 6 in)
- Wing area: 16 m^{2} (170 sq ft)
- Aspect ratio: 9.0
- Empty weight: 678 kg (1,495 lb)
- Gross weight: 1,100 kg (2,425 lb)
- Fuel capacity: 180 L (40 imp gal; 48 US gal)
- Powerplant: 1 × Lorraine 5Pc 5-cylinder radial, 89 kW (120 hp) maximum continuous, at 1,350 rpm
- Propellers: 2-bladed

Performance

- Maximum speed: 200 km/h (120 mph, 110 kn)
- Cruise speed: 170 km/h (110 mph, 92 kn)
- Range: 950 km (590 mi, 510 nmi)
- Service ceiling: 4,500 m (14,800 ft) practical
- Time to altitude: 5 min to 1,000 m (3,300 ft)
- Take-off speed: 80 km/h (50 mph)
