= List of aircraft of the Spanish Republican Air Force =

Fin flash (1931–1939)

This is a list of aircraft used by the Spanish Republican Air Force during the Spanish Civil War.

== Introduction ==
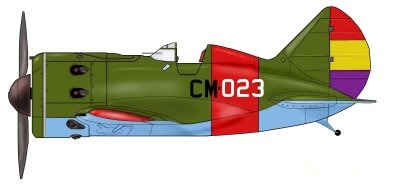
Polikarpov I-16 'Mosca', one of the primary aircraft of the Spanish Republican Air Force during the Civil War.

The Second Spanish Republic was proclaimed in 1931 and very soon the republican authorities set up to reform an antiquated military structure that was a financial burden for the Spanish state following the Great Depression. The Spanish Republican Air Force inherited a great number of airplanes from the monarchy, most of which had been used in the Spanish Campaigns in Northern Africa during general Primo de Rivera's dictatorship in the 1920s.

While more than half of the aircraft of the Spanish Republican Air Force remained on the loyalist side, most of the materiel was obsolete. In the summer of 1936 the beleaguered Spanish Republic found itself direly in need of modern weapons, but the governments of the United Kingdom and France quickly led a policy of non-intervention in the Spanish Civil War. In defiance of the non-intervention pact some aircraft were sent to Republican Spain from France thanks to the efforts of personalities supporting the republican cause, but these consisted mostly in old material, including trainers, transport aircraft and planes without weapons that could not be used for attacks. Owing to the international blockade against the republic other planes of dubious value were acquired by the republican government through various sources, including Mexico, the Netherlands, Belgium and Czechoslovakia which included a motley combination of obsolete aircraft, prototypes and almost discarded single models. Some of the shipments of aircraft did not make it to the Spanish fronts owing to the sinking of the merchant vessels transporting them or having been seized by the customs at the ports of origin. The most well-known Spanish Republican Air Force planes such as the 'Chato', 'Mosca', 'Natacha' and 'Katiuska' would come later in the same year and throughout 1937, when the USSR would decide to openly assist the Spanish Republic.

=== Documents ===
Information, both written and pictorial, regarding the identification of the aircraft of the Spanish Republican Air Force is found in a variety of sources. These include press reports of the time, official republican government documents, as well as documents and reports from the rebel side.

Since republican aerodromes were restricted military areas, relatively few photographs are available. Most are pictures of aircraft taken with air force personnel posing near them in an informal way, as well as photographs of crashed planes. Except for the primary aircraft, certain republican military plane types were never photographed, or if available, photographs have not been found, being only known from written documents or from pilot reports. This is often the case in the assorted —often obsolete and almost useless— aircraft of which only one or two units arrived in the first critical months at the beginning of the civil war. There are also aircraft which had been known only from written documents, such as the Spanish Republican Air Force Farman F.430, of which a picture has surfaced only recently.

== Attack aircraft ==
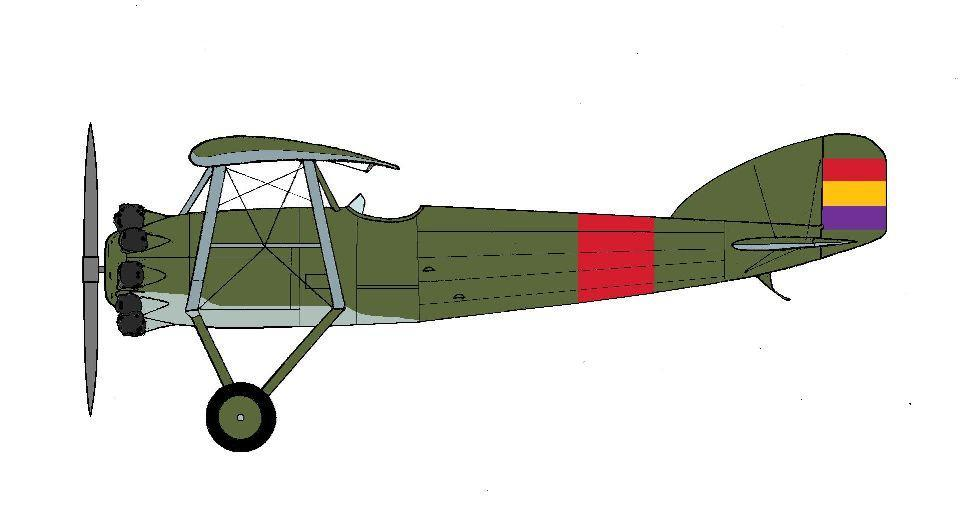
Gourdou-Leseurre GL.32

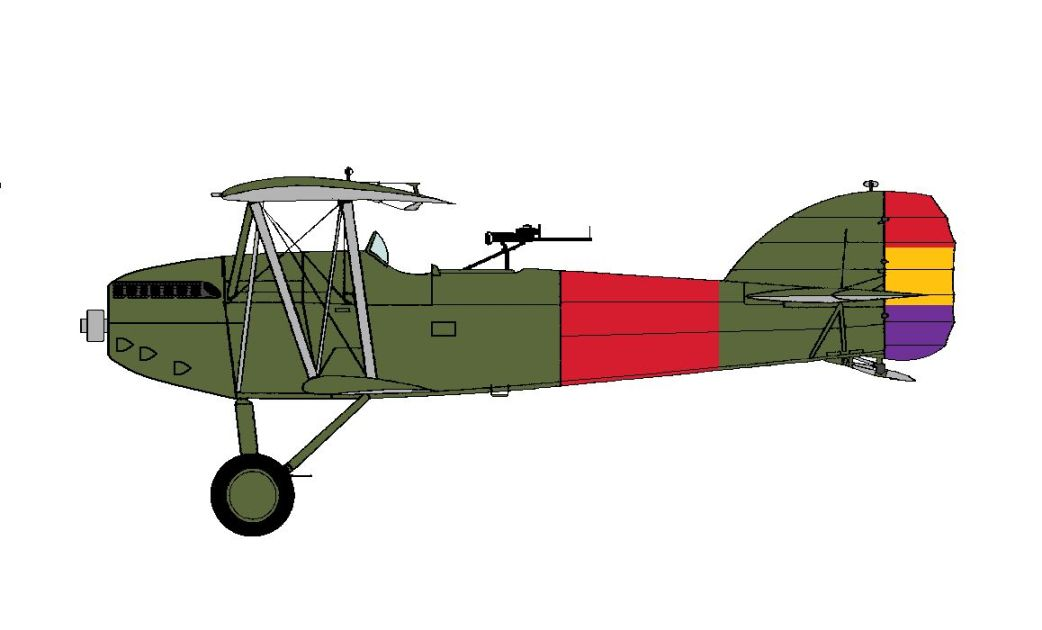
Potez 25

- Beechcraft Staggerwing
- Breguet XIX
- Gourdou-Leseurre GL.32
- Gourdou-Leseurre GL-633
- Grumman G-23, nicknamed 'Delfín'
- Hispano-Suiza E-30
- Potez 25
- Vickers Vildebeest

== Bombers ==
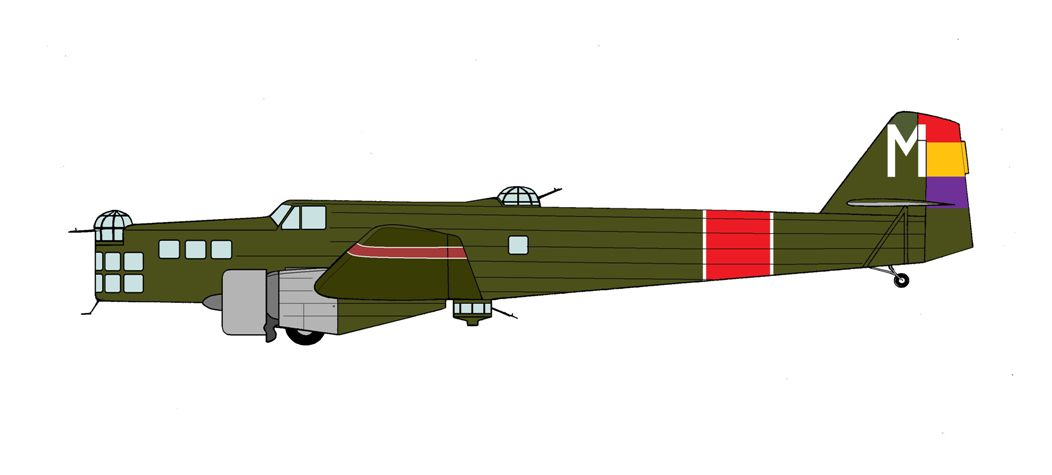
MB.210

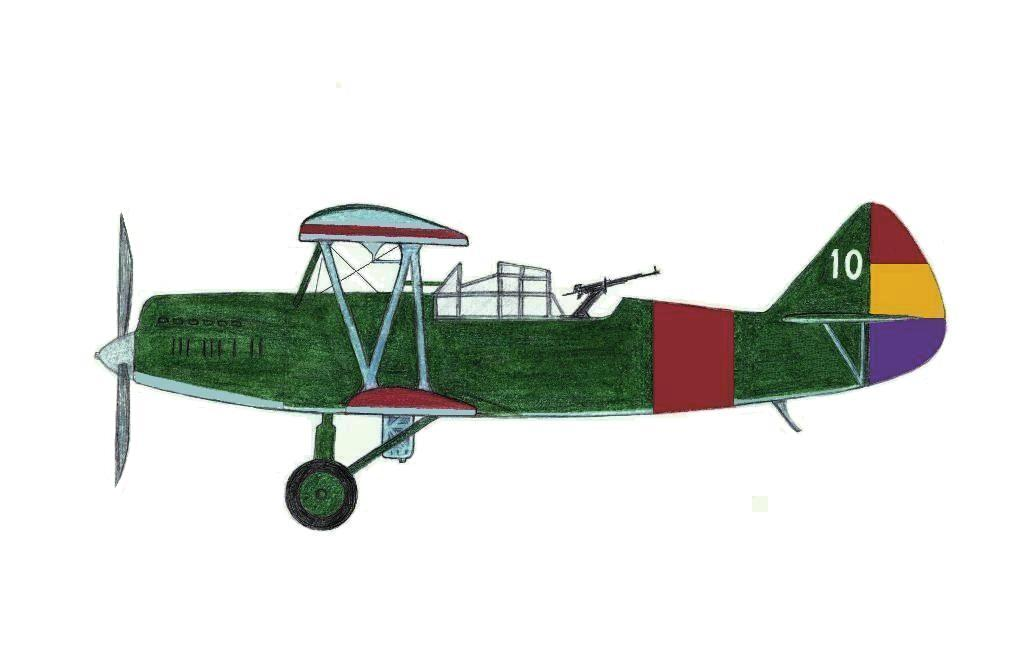
Polikarpov R-Z 'Natacha'

- Bloch MB.200, photographic data are lacking
- Bloch MB.210
- Breguet 413,
- Breguet 460 Vultur
- Fokker F.IX
- Hawker Spanish Osprey
- Latecoere 28
- Macchi M.18
- Polikarpov R-5, also known as 'Rasante'
- Polikarpov R-Z, nicknamed 'Natacha'
- Potez 540
- Tupolev SB, nicknamed 'Katiuska'
- Vultee V-1

== Fighters ==
Dewoitine D.510

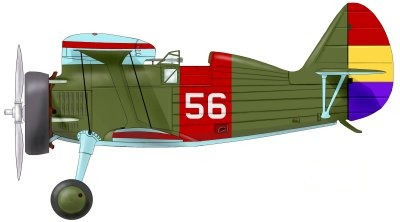
Polikarpov I-15 "Chato"

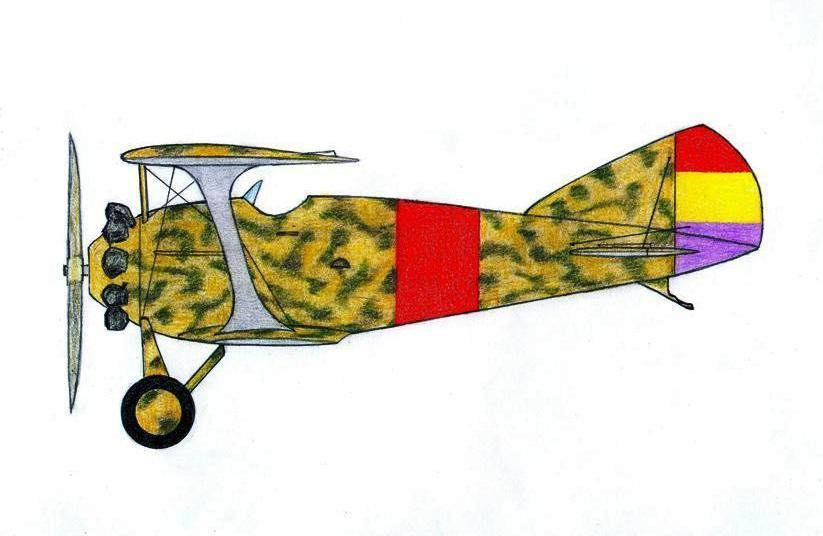
Blériot-SPAD S.51

- AEKKEA-RAAB R-29
- Avia BH-33
- Bristol Bulldog (1 only for evaluation)
- Blériot-SPAD S.51
- Blériot-SPAD S.91
- Boeing 281 (1 example only)
- Dewoitine D.27
- Dewoitine D.53
- Dewoitine D.372
- Dewoitine D.510
- Fokker D.XXI
- Hawker Hispano Fury
- Letov Š-31
- Letov Š-231
- Letov Š-331 (1 example only)
- Loire 46
- Martinsyde F.4 Buzzard
- Hispano-Nieuport Ni-52
- Polikarpov I-15, nicknamed 'Chato'
- Polikarpov I-16, nicknamed 'Mosca'

== Patrol and liaison aircraft ==
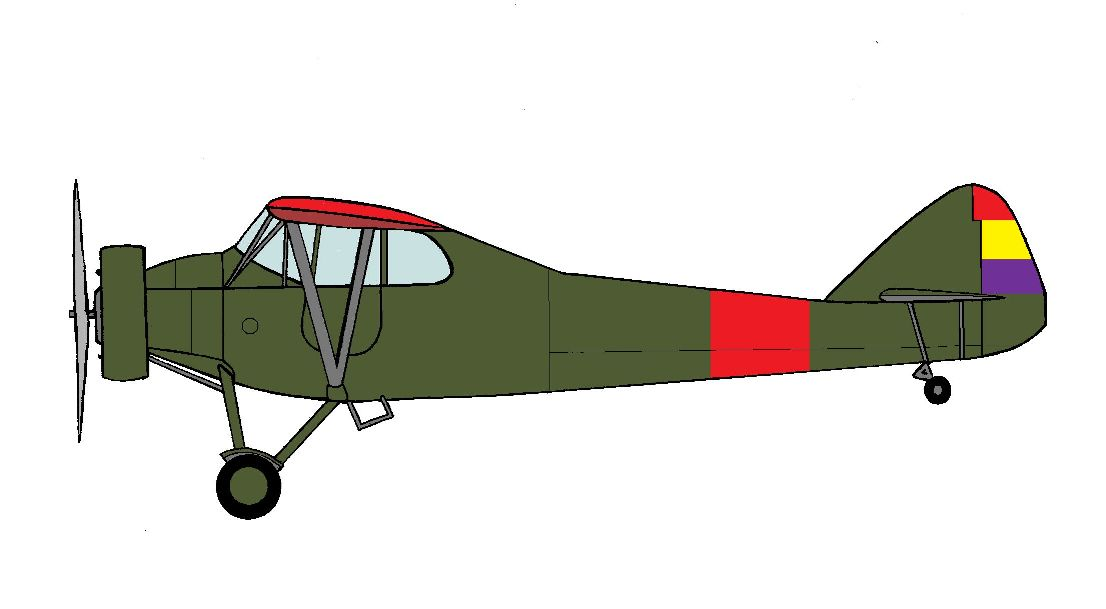
Potez 58

- Caudron C.600 Aiglon
- de Havilland DH.83 Fox Moth
- Dornier Do J Wal
- Fokker C.X
- Lockheed Model 9 Orion
- Macchi M.18
- Miles Falcon
- Potez 58
- RWD 9
- Sikorsky S-38B, one unit was used in the Northern Front. Shot down by friendly fire
- Vickers Vildebeest

== Reconnaissance ==
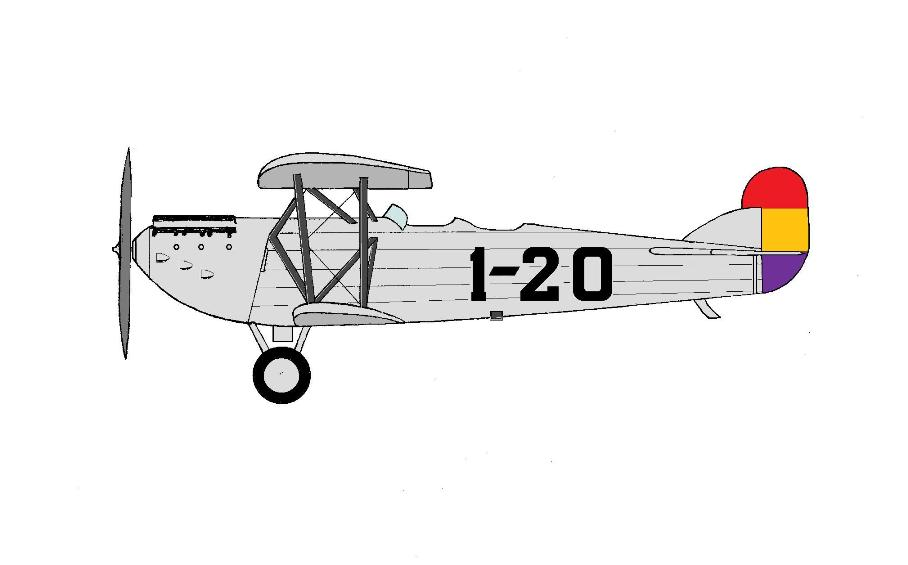
Loring R-III

- Aero A.101
- Bellanca 28-70
- Caudron C.59
- Koolhoven F.K.51
- Loring R-3, may have seen active service, but data are lacking
- Savoia-Marchetti SM.62
- Seversky SEV-3
- Spartan Executive

== Trainers ==
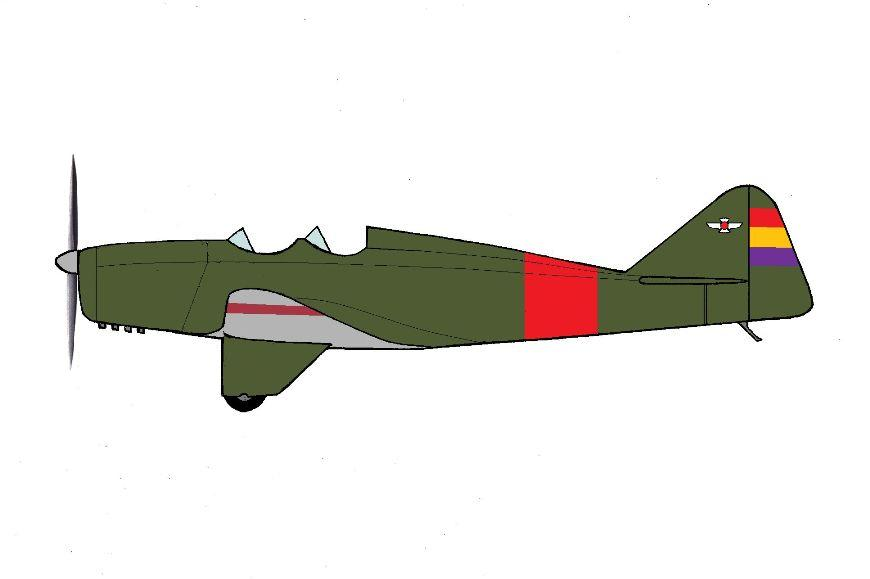
González Gil-Pazó GP-1

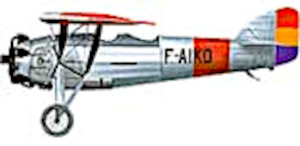
Morane-Saulnier MS.230

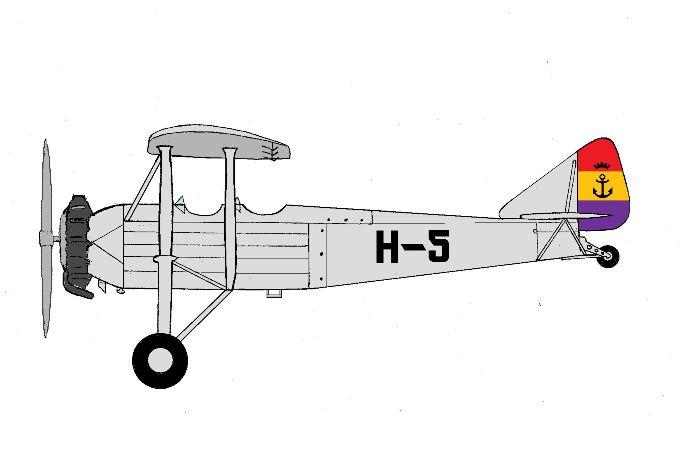
Hispano Suiza E-30

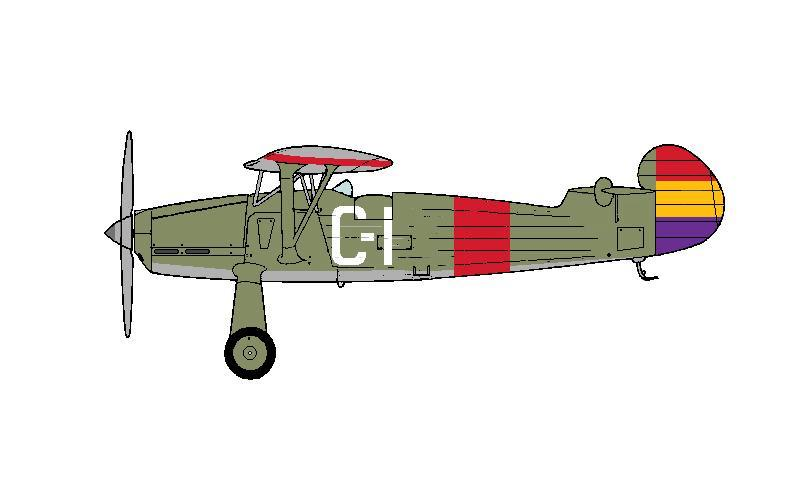
Focke-Wulf Fw 56

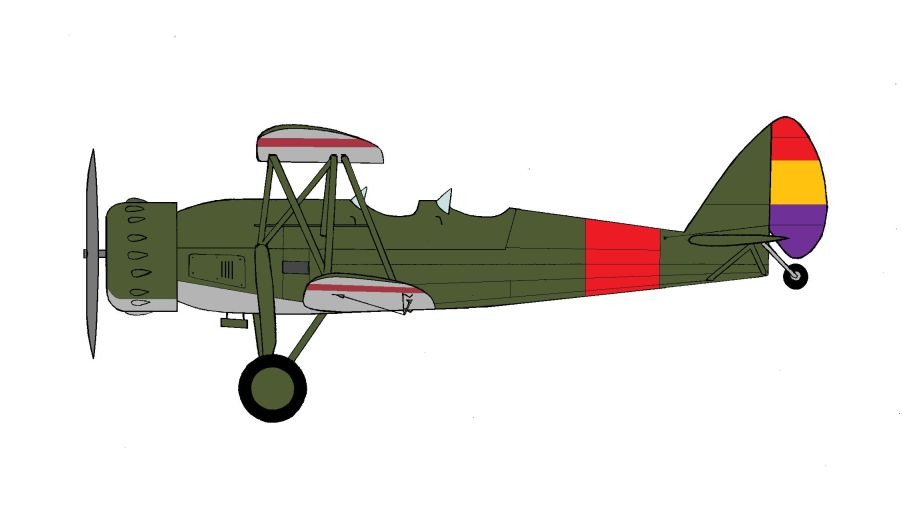
Romano R.82

- Avia BH-33
- Avro 504, obsolete by 1936, but some Aeronáutica Naval Avros may have been used as trainers
- Avro 594
- Avro 626
- Avro 643 Cadet
- BFW M.35
- British Aircraft Swallow
- Bücker Bü 133 Jungmeister
- CASA III
- Caudron C.270 Luciole
- Comper Swift
- de Havilland DH.60 Moth Major
- de Havilland Tiger Moth
- Farman F.354
- Farman F.480 Alizé
- Focke-Wulf Fw 56
- General Aircraft Monospar ST-4
- General Aircraft Monospar ST-12
- González Gil-Pazó GP-1
- González Gil-Pazó GP-4
- Hanriot H.180
- Hanriot H.437
- Hispano-Suiza E-34
- Loring E-2
- Miles M.2 Hawk Trainer
- Morane-Saulnier MS.181
- Morane-Saulnier MS.230
- Morane-Saulnier MS.341
- Moreau JM.10 designer murdered while trying to sell single aircraft, use and fate unknown.
- Romano R.82
- Romano R.83
- Romano R.92
- S.F.C.A. Maillet 21
- SAB-SEMA 12
- Spartan Zeus, purchased but not delivered
- Stampe et Vertongen RSV.32

== Transport aircraft ==
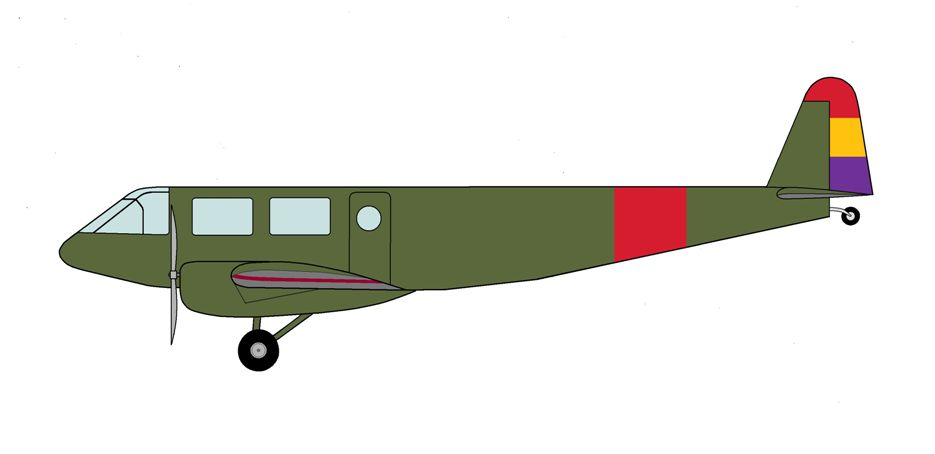
Farman F.430

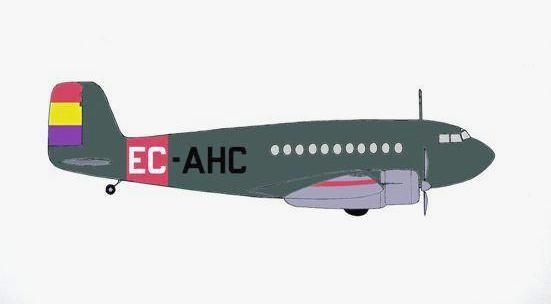
Breguet 470 Fulgur

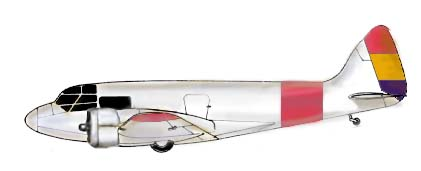
Airspeed Viceroy

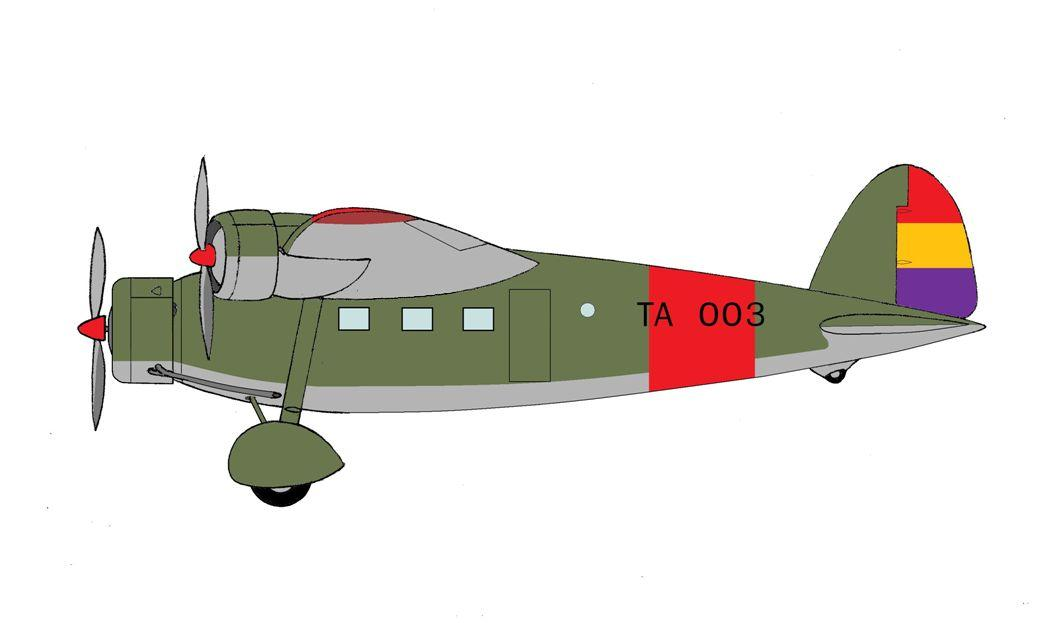
Avia 51

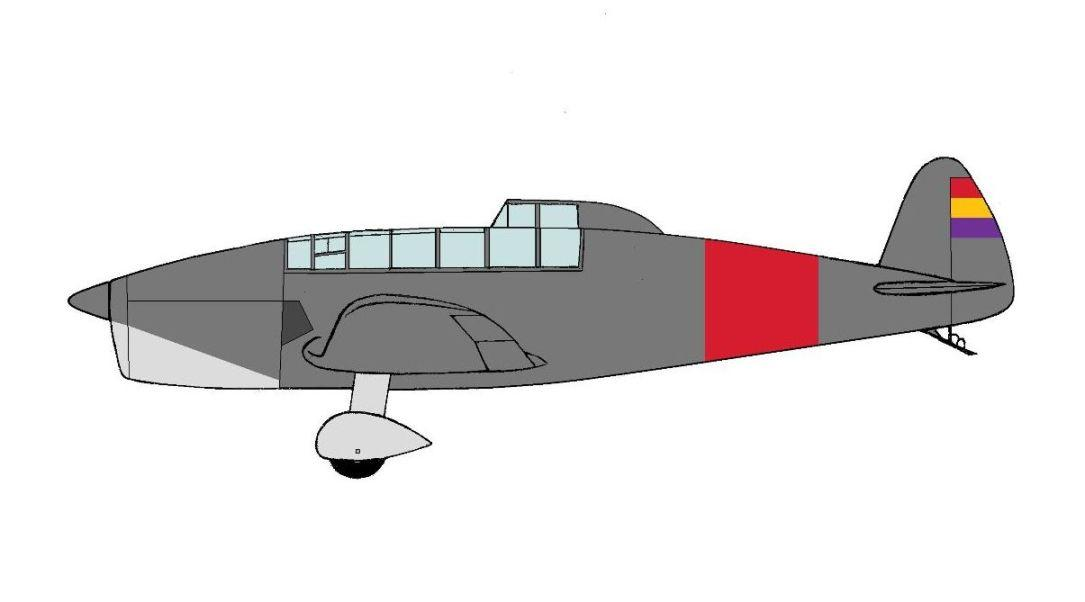
SFCA Maillet 21

Many of the aircraft used for transport and liaison by the Republican Air Force had been requisitioned from LAPE, the Spanish Republican airline.

- Airspeed Envoy
- Airspeed Viceroy
- Avia 51
- Blériot 111
- Blériot-SPAD S.56
- Breguet 26T
- Breguet 470 Fulgur, from LAPE
- British Aircraft Eagle
- Caudron C.440 Goéland
- Consolidated Fleetster
- Couzinet 101
- De Havilland DH-80 Puss Moth
- De Havilland DH-84
- De Havilland DH-89M
- De Havilland DH-90
- Douglas DC-1
- Douglas DC-2
- Farman F.190
- Farman F 402
- Farman F.430
- Fokker F-VII.3m/M also used as a bomber in Asturias.
- Fokker F.XVIII
- Fokker F.XX
- Ford Trimotor
- General Aircraft ST-25, from LAPE
- General Aviation GA-43, from LAPE
- Junkers K 30
- Koolhoven F.K.40
- Latécoère 28
- Lioré et Olivier 213
- Lockheed Model 10 Electra
- Lockheed Model 8 Sirius
- Lockheed Vega
- Northrop Delta, from LAPE
- Northrop Gamma
- Potez 560 from LAPE

== Autogyros ==
- Cierva C.19
- Cierva C.30A

== Captured aircraft ==
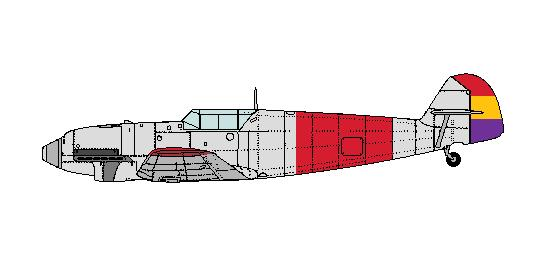
The Messerschmitt Bf109B captured at Bujaraloz in 1938.

Planes of the Nationalist Spanish Air Force that fell into the hands of the Republicans.

- Fiat CR.32, a number of these biplanes were captured and incorporated into the Republican Air Force. One of them was sent to the training facility at El Carmolí.
- Heinkel He 111B-1, one unit of the Condor Legion captured after a forced landing in Cuenca ended up being sent to the Soviet Union.
- Messerschmitt Bf 109B, another Condor Legion plane that was captured intact near Bujaraloz, Aragon, also ended up being sent to the USSR.
- Savoia-Marchetti SM.81A, a bomber of the Aviazione Legionaria, was incorporated into the Republican Air Force.

== See also ==
- List of Interwar military aircraft
- Spanish Republican Navy
- Yankee Squadron
