= Blériot 111 =

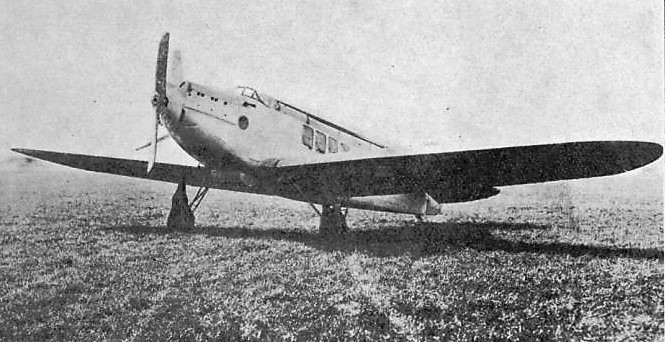
- Bleriot 111

General information
- Type: Executive transport monoplane
- Manufacturer: Blériot Aéronautique
- Designer: André Herbemont
- Number built: 2+

History
- First flight: 24 January 1929

The Blériot 111 was a French four-seat executive transport monoplane designed by André Herbemont. The first French aircraft to be fitted with a retractable landing gear, after six years development it was not ordered into production.

== Design and development ==
The Bleriot 111 was a low-wing single-engined monoplane with an enclosed passenger cabin and an open cockpit for the pilot forward of the cabin. The first variant was the Bleriot 111/1 which first flew on 24 January 1929 powered by a 280 hp (209 kW) Hispano-Suiza 6Mbr 6-cyl. water-cooled in-line engine. In October 1929 a second variant flew (known as the 111bis or 111/2) which had a modified landing gear. The 111/2 was re-engined with a 420 hp (313 kW) Gnome & Rhône 9Ady radial engine and re-designated 111/3. The 111/3 was flown as part of the Patrouille Blériot which gave exhibitions and demonstrations around France and Spain in the 1930s.

The 111/1 was modified as the 111/4 with a revised wing bracing, a 400 hp (298 kW) Hispano-Suiza 12Jb engine and retractable landing gear, a first for a French aircraft. The 111/4 flew on 27 October 1930. The next variant was the 111/5 which moved the pilot's cockpit to the rear of the passenger cabin and was fitted with a 500 hp (373 kW) Hispano-Suiza 12Mbr engine. A re-engined variant of the 111/5 was fitted with a 500 hp (373 kW) Gnome-Rhône K-14(sic) radial engine and was named Sagittaire (English: Sagittarius).

Sagittaire later fitted with a new wing and 840 hp (626 kW) Gnome & Rhône 14Kbrs and was re-designated 111/6. The 111/6 was entered into the 1934 London to Melbourne air race but it was withdrawn when the landing gear was damaged two days before the race start. With no commercial interest in the design no more Bleriot 111s were built.

== Variants ==
Bleriot 111/1
Powered by a 280 hp (209 kW) Hispano-Suiza 6Mbr 6-cyl. water-cooled in-line engine.
Bleriot 111/2 / bis
Modified landing gear.
Bleriot 111/3
The 111/2 re-engined with a 420 hp (313 kW) Gnome & Rhône 9Ady radial engine. This aircraft ended up in the Spanish Republican Air Force during the Spanish Civil War.
Bleriot 111/4
The 111/1 was modified as the 111/4 with a revised wing bracing, a 400 hp (298 kW) Hispano-Suiza 12Jb engine and retractable landing gear, a first for a French aircraft.
Bleriot 111/5

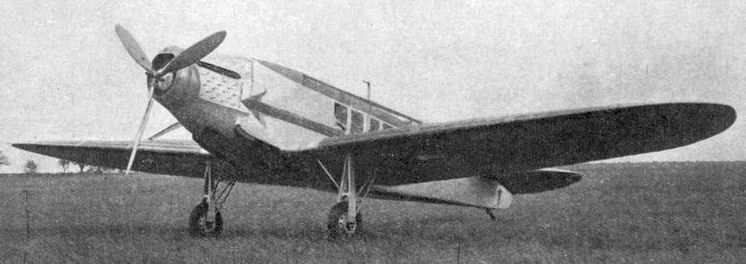
Bleriot 111/5 photo from L'Aerophile Salon 1932

The pilot's cockpit moved to the rear of the passenger cabin and fitted with a 500 hp (373 kW) Hispano-Suiza 12Mbr engine.
Sagittaire

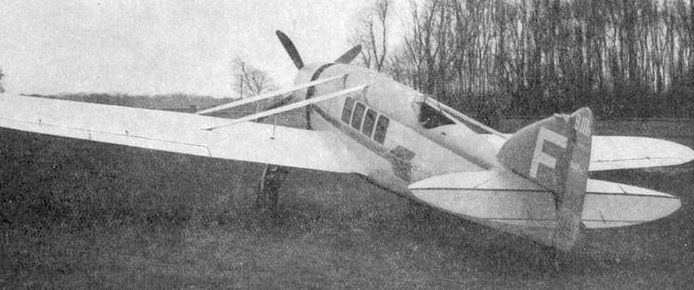
Blériot Sagittaire photo from L'Aerophile November 1934

A re-engined variant of the 111/5 was fitted with a 500 hp (373 kW) Gnome-Rhône K-14(sic) radial engine and was named Sagittaire (English: Sagittarius).
Bleriot 111/6
Sagittaire later fitted with a new wing and 840 hp (626 kW) Gnome & Rhône 14Kbrs

== Operators ==
France

- French Air Force

Spain

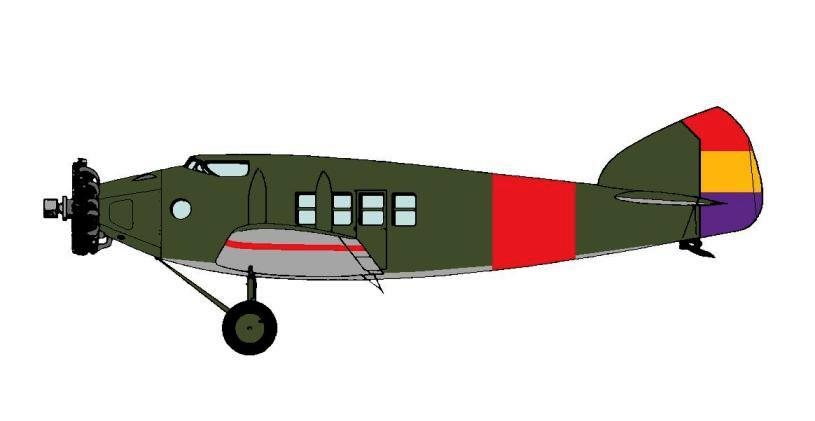
Republican Air force Bleriot 111/3

- Spanish Republican Air Force - Bleriot 111/3

== Specifications (111/6) ==
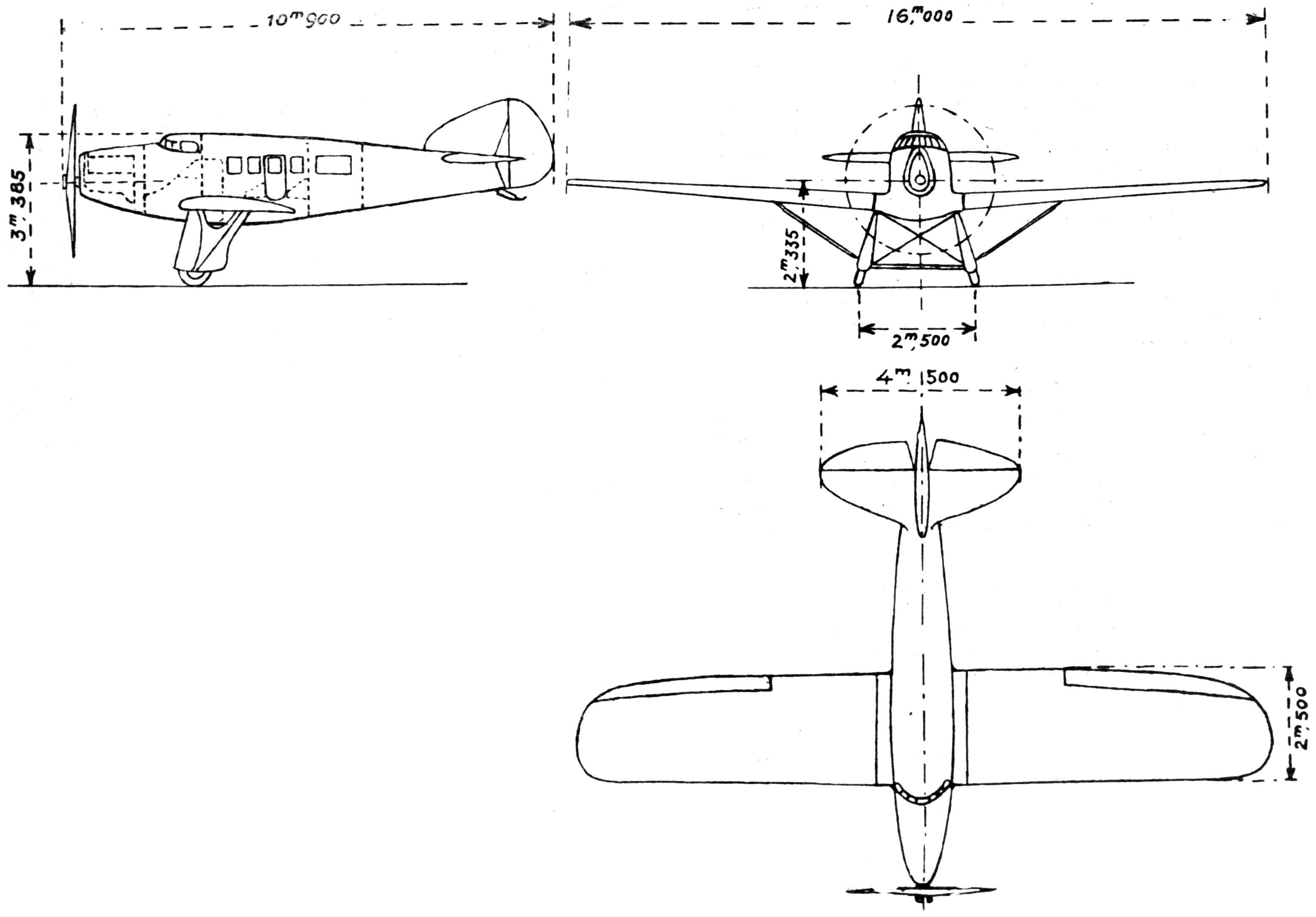
Blériot 111 3-view drawing from L'Air November 15, 1928

Data from The Illustrated Encyclopedia of Aircraft

General characteristics

- Crew: 1
- Capacity: four passengers
- Length: 10.66 m (34 ft 11.75 in)
- Wingspan: 17.00 m (55 ft 9.25 in)
- Height: 4.07 m (14 ft 4.25 in)
- Wing area: 34.57 m^{2} (372.12 sq ft)
- Empty weight: 2,136 kg (4,709 lb)
- Gross weight: 3,400 kg (7,496 lb)
- Powerplant: 1 × Gnome-Rhône 14Kbrs radial engine , 636 kW (840 hp)

Performance

- Maximum speed: 370 km/h (230 mph, 200 kn)
- Range: 1,000 km (621 mi, 540 nmi)
- Service ceiling: 5,500 m (18,045 ft)

== See also ==
Related lists

- List of aircraft of the Spanish Republican Air Force
