= Lorraine-Hanriot LH.21S =

1930s French air ambulance aircraft

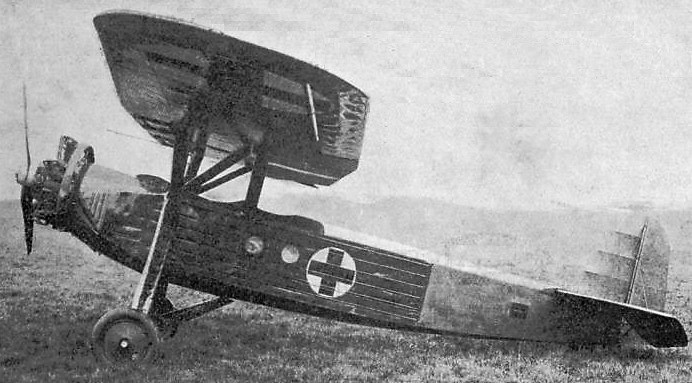

General information
- Type: Air ambulance
- National origin: France
- Manufacturer: Lorraine-Hanriot
- Number built: 2

History
- First flight: c. autumn 1930

The Lorraine-Hanriot LH.21S was designed and built in 1930 to meet a French government requirement for a small air ambulance capable of operating in the colonies. It did not reach production.

== Design ==
Around 1930 there was a French interest in small aircraft capable of evacuating a single ill or wounded patient to hospital from roughly prepared sites in the colonies. The Potez 42 and the Guillemin JG.40 were examples of the category and the Lorraine-Hanriot LH.21S was another. They posed several design challenges, principally around the need for a large, clear internal space for the patient, with easy ground access from a stretcher.

In order to assist side access for the patient, both the Guillemin and the Lorraine-Hanriot had high-set wings, the latter's in parasol configuration. The wing was in two parts, each with a rectangular plan inner section occupying about 40% of the span and a straight-tapered outer part which ended in rounded tips. The outer regions also tapered in thickness from below, providing mild dihedral, and their trailing edges were almost entirely filled by narrow chord, unbalanced ailerons. The wing was a wholly wooden structure built around two box spars and covered with plywood. The upper fuselage was attached to the wing by pairs of N-form struts to the wing spars at about 30% span. Two lighter, transverse, inverted-V cabane struts, which shared fuselage attachment points with the main struts, supported the wing centre.

In contrast to the wooden wing, the flat-sided fuselage was all-metal, with a dural tube structure. It was dural skinned apart from an easily removable section over the rear of the patient's compartment which enabled it be rapidly reconfigured to take a seated passenger. Stretcher access to this space was via a port-side door about 2.25 m (7 ft 5 in) long. Inside there were elastic supports for the stretcher, a fan and a 300 Watt heater. The pilot's open cockpit was immediately ahead of the patient's compartment and under the mid-chord of the wing, where a small, rectangular opening provided an upward field of view. He had a small, port-side door to allow a parachute escape.

The Lorraine-Hanriot was powered by an uncowled five-cylinder 89 kW (120 hp) Lorraine 5Pc radial engine. It had fixed landing gear, with each mainwheel on a cranked axle assisted by a trailing drag strut, both hinged on the central fuselage underside. Tall, inward-leaning oleo struts were mounted from the same upper fuselage point as the forward wing struts. The small tailskid also had an oleo shock absorber.

Its tail surfaces were round-tipped, with the horizontal tail mounted on top of the fuselage. All of the control surfaces were unbalanced; the elevators had a small cut-out to allow movement of the rudder, which extended down to the keel.

== Development ==
Lorraine-Hanriot completed the LH.21S at Villacoublay in August 1930, though the date of the first flight is not known. It was on display at the 12th Paris Salon in December 1930 and by February 1931 it was with the STIAé for certification tests.

Comparative testing by military pilots of the three air-ambulances was under way by March 1931. Test flights of the Lorraine-Hanriot continued until at least June 1931.

In July 1931 Les Amis de l'aviation sanitaire (Friends of Medical Aviation) organised a large meeting on the subject spread over several days, one of which was used for demonstration flights undertaken by nine different types of aircraft. The Lorraine-Hanriot LH.21S, Potez 42, and Guillemin JG.40 formed the single patient group.

None of these aircraft gained a government contract, so only two Lorraine-Hanriot LH.21S were built. The small air-ambulance role was filled by the later and more powerful Bloch MB.81.

== Specifications ==
Data from L'Aéronautique December 1930

General characteristics

- Crew: One pilot
- Capacity: One patient
- Length: 7.80 m (25 ft 7 in)
- Wingspan: 12.33 m (40 ft 5 in) (two other contemporary sources give 12.20 m (40 ft 0 in)
- Height: 2.93 m (9 ft 7 in)
- Wing area: 29.50 m^{2} (317.5 sq ft)
- Empty weight: 80 kg (176 lb)
- Gross weight: 980 kg (2,161 lb) with fuel for five hours flight
- Powerplant: 1 × Lorraine 5Pc 5-cylinder radial, 89 kW (120 hp)
- Propellers: 2-bladed

Performance

- Maximum speed: 155 km/h (96 mph, 84 kn) at ground level
- Stall speed: 60 km/h (37 mph, 32 kn) minimum speed
- Range: 700 km (430 mi, 380 nmi)
- Service ceiling: 4,800 m (15,700 ft)
- Time to altitude: 21 min to 2,000 m (6,561 ft 8 in)
