= Société Aérienne Bordelaise =

Defunct French aircraft manufacturer

- Industry: Aeronautics, defence
- Predecessor: Société de Travaux Dyle et Bacalan
- Founded: 1930
- Defunct: 1936
- Fate: Merged
- Successor: Société nationale des constructions aéronautiques du sud-ouest (SNCASO)
- Headquarters: Bordeaux, France
- Products: Aircraft

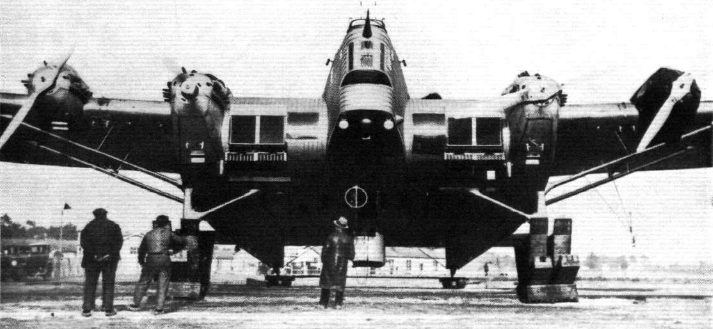
The SAB AB-20 bomber project built in 1932.

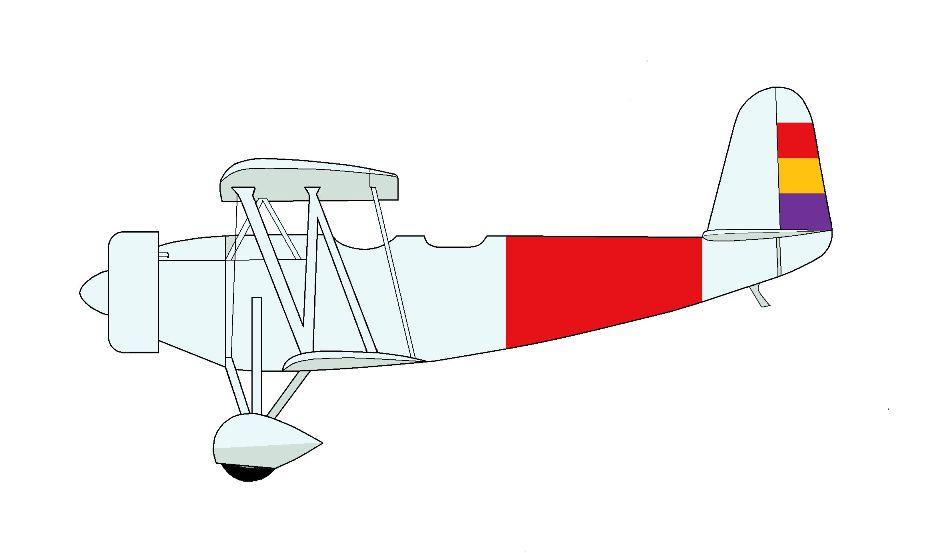
SAB-SEMA 12 trainer of the Spanish Republican Air Force. Los Alcázares flying school.

The Société Aérienne Bordelaise (French pronunciation: [sɔsjete aeʁjɛn bɔʁdəlɛz]; SAB) was an aircraft manufacturing company based in Bordeaux, France. The predecessor company, Société de Travaux Dyle et Bacalan had been founded in 1879.

== History ==
The Société Aérienne Bordelaise was established in 1930 when the Société de Travaux Dyle et Bacalan, which had specialized mainly in railways, public works and shipbuilding, decided to establish a branch dedicated to aeronautical construction. Most of the aircraft built by SAB remained in the project stage and no production followed.

In 1935 the Société Aérienne Bordelaise, like most private French aviation industries was nationalized, following which in 1936 it became part of the Société nationale des constructions aéronautiques du sud-ouest (SNCASO).

== Aircraft ==
- SAB-SEMA 10 (Societé Aérienne Bordelaise – Societé d'Etudes de Materiel d'Aviation)
- SAB-SEMA 12 (Societé Aérienne Bordelaise – Societé d'Etudes de Materiel d'Aviation)
- SAB AB-20
- SAB AB-21
- SAB AB-22
- SAB AB-80
- SAB DB-80
- SAB DB-81
- SAB LH-70 (a.k.a. Lorraine Hanriot LH-70)
- SAB turret bomber (at least two built / converted with VERY large turrets)
