= Potez 42 =

General information
- Type: Air ambulance
- National origin: France
- Manufacturer: Aéroplanes Henry Potez
- Number built: 1

History
- First flight: early August 1930

The Potez 42 was designed and built in 1930 to meet a French government requirement for a small air ambulance capable of operating in the colonies. It did not reach production.

== Design ==
Around 1930 there was a French interest in small aircraft capable of evacuating a single ill or wounded patient to hospital from roughly prepared sites in the colonies. The Lorraine-Hanriot LH.21S and the Guillemin JG.40 were examples of the category and the Potez 42 was another. They posed several design challenges, principally around the need for a large, clear enclosure for the patient with easy ground access from a stretcher.

The Potez 42 differed most obviously from the Hanriot and the Guillemin in having a low wing. This assisted take-off and landing performance, important for short, rough strip operation but required the patient's compartment to be well behind the centre of gravity for easy access, making trimming more difficult. The cantilever wing was in three parts, with a short (3.0 m (120 in)) centre-section and long outer panels. Strongly straight tapered in plan, though with very little sweep on the leading edge, it had a high aspect ratio (8.2); the tips were semi-elliptical. High aspect ratio ailerons occupied about half the span. The wings were built around two spruce spars.

The Potez 42's fuselage, like the wings built of wood, was constructed around a frame based on four longerons and was flat-sided apart from light, rounded upper decking. It was covered in plywood. The 89 kW (120 hp) Salmson 9Ac nine-cylinder radial engine appears uncowled in photographs though early diagrams include a narrow chord Townend ring. Its pilot was in an open cockpit over the wing, with a port side door. His equipment included eight weighted messages, six droppable rockets and a pistol. The patient's compartment was behind the cockpit, under a one-piece, easily removable fairing which was provided with a forward window on each side and rear air vents. The patient was lowered into the aircraft on his stretcher which was guided by rails into four elastic supports. A strap secured him and there was an electrical heater.

The fin had a cropped triangular profile and the tailplane was mounted well forward on it, just above the fuselage to which it was braced from below on each side with a single strut. Its balanced rudder was full, prominent and extended down to the keel and the inset, unbalanced elevators were on forward swept hinges so that the overall horizontal tail was strongly tapered in plan.

The Potez 42 had fixed, tailwheel landing gear with a track of 2.86 m (113 in). Each mainwheel was on a bent axle and a drag strut, both hinged on the lower fuselage longeron and with a vertical, stacked rubber ring shock absorber strut of Potez design to the centre-section forward spar. The wheels had differential brakes for steering, aided by a small, elastically mounted castoring tailwheel.

== Development ==
The Potez 42's first flights were made in the first week of August 1930. Potez's chief test pilot Labouchière found its initial handling satisfactory. Like the Guillemin JG.40, it was on display at the 12th Paris Salon in December 1930.

By late January 1931 the Potez 42 had already made several evaluation flights at Villacoublay. In July 1931 Les Amis de l'aviation sanitaire (Friends of Medical Aviation) organised a large meeting on the subject spread over several days, one of which was used for demonstration flights undertaken by nine different types of aircraft. The Potez 42, a Guillemin JG.40 and a Lorraine-Hanriot LH.21S formed the single patient group. By September it was back at Villacoublay, undergoing extensive static tests.

The Potez 42 did not receive a government order so only one example was built. The small air-ambulance role was filled by the later and more powerful Bloch MB.81.

== Specifications ==
Data from Les Ailes January 1931

General characteristics

- Length: 7.94 m (26 ft 1 in)
- Wingspan: 12.84 m (42 ft 2 in)
- Height: 2.34 m (7 ft 8 in)
- Wing area: 20 m^{2} (220 sq ft)
- Empty weight: 708 kg (1,561 lb)
- Gross weight: 970 kg (2,138 lb)
- Fuel capacity: 107 kg (236 lb) fuel and oil
- Powerplant: 1 × Salmson 9Ac 9-cylinder radial, 89 kW (120 hp) at 1,800 r.p.m.
- Propellers: 2-bladed

Performance

- Maximum speed: 185 km/h (115 mph, 100 kn)
- Service ceiling: 5,000 m (16,000 ft) absolute
