= Farman F.480 Alizé =

F.480 Alizé

General information
- Type: Training and touring aircraft
- National origin: France
- Manufacturer: Farman, Boulogne-Billancourt
- Number built: 12

History
- First flight: May 1936

The Farman F.480 Alizé was a single engine, two seat, parasol winged monoplane built in France in the mid-1930s. Designed as a tourer and trainer, all Alizés served as training aircraft for government (Republican) forces during the Spanish Civil War.

== Design and development ==
The Alizé (Tradewind in English) was designed in 1936 as a tourer/trainer, though in the end it served almost entirely as a trainer. Its flat sided, round decked fuselage seated two in open, tandem cockpits, fitted from the outset with dual control. The rear cockpit was at the trailing edge of the parasol wing, which had a small cut-out for improved visibility; the forward cockpit was under the wing. The wing itself was of parallel chord with rounded tips. Like the rest of the Alizé, it had a wooden structure. Two pairs of parallel struts joined the wing to the lower fuselage longerons, assisted by vertical ancillary struts outboard and a cabane structure with two main struts per side, another pair of thinner struts going forward to the upper rear engine mounting. Both vertical and horizontal tail surfaces were straight edged and nearly rectangular. The rudder operated in a cut-out between the elevators, carried on the strut braced stabilizers. The Alizé had a fixed, split axle conventional undercarriage. The main undercarriage legs, each carrying a single mainwheel, were mounted vertically on the forward wing struts, with half-axles hinged from the centre line of the fuselage bottom. Secondary struts ran forward from the top and bottom of each leg to points on the rear of the engine mounting.

The Alizé was powered by an uncowled 110 hp (82 kW) Lorraine 5P engine, a five-cylinder radial. It had a long exhaust pipe reaching under the aircraft rearwards, passing between the radius arms and ending below the forward cockpit.

The first flight was in May 1936. The first prototype completed its certification tests in late September 1936 and received its certificate in December. The second prototype was certified the same day; ten more Alizés, already built in the Boulogne-Billancourt factory were also approved the following day.

== Operational history ==
The history of the Alizé was determined by events not in France but in neighbouring Spain, where a military backed rebellion against the government had broken out in July 1936, beginning the Spanish Civil War. Since the military controlled the bulk of the Spanish Air Force's equipment, the government had to look abroad for replacement aircraft. France was, after some wavering, unwilling to provide true military machines but was prepared to turn a blind eye to the export of civil French aircraft that might have military potential, so long as this was done quietly. Some 50 French civil aircraft went to Spain this way, including all 12 Alizés. By June 1937 they were serving as trainers at three pilot schools across Spain.

== Operators ==
Spain

- Spanish Republican Air Force

== Specifications ==
Data from Les avions Farman p.230-1

General characteristics

- Capacity: 2
- Length: 7.38 m (24 ft 3 in)
- Wingspan: 11.60 m (38 ft 1 in)
- Height: 2.60 m (8 ft 6 in)
- Wing area: 17.55 m^{2} (188.9 sq ft)
- Empty weight: 544 kg (1,199 lb)
- Gross weight: 845 kg (1,863 lb)
- Powerplant: 1 × Lorraine 5Pb 5-cylinder radial, 82 kW (110 hp)
- Propellers: 2-bladed

Performance

- Maximum speed: 215 km/h (134 mph, 116 kn)
- Range: 585 km (364 mi, 316 nmi)
- Service ceiling: 3,000 m (9,800 ft)

== See also ==
Related lists

- List of aircraft of the Spanish Republican Air Force

== Bibliography ==
- Liron, Jean (1984). Les avions Farman. Collection Docavia. Vol. 21. Paris: Éditions Larivière. OCLC 37146471.
