= SAB AB-80 =

1930s French bomber aircraft

AB-80
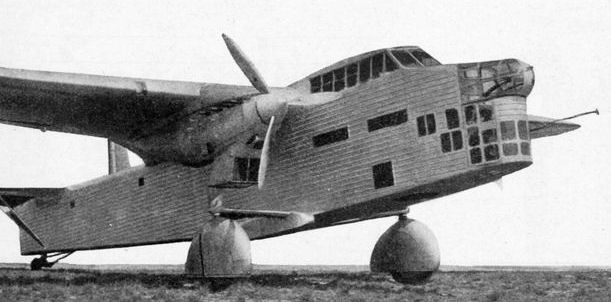
- SAB AB-80

General information
- Type: Bomber
- National origin: France
- Manufacturer: Société Aérienne Bordelaise (SAB)
- Number built: 1

History
- First flight: 23 June 1934

The SAB AB-80 was a French bomber built in 1934 by the Société Aérienne Bordelaise (SAB) in Bordeaux.

== Design ==
The SAB AB-80 was a high-wing monoplane bomber development that was intended to eventually also carry troops. It was built wholly of metal and was powered by two 640 kW (860 hp) Hispano-Suiza 12Ybrs engines.

The aircraft had roofed fighting platforms and the sides were protected by armour plate and bulletproof glass. The gunner's cockpit in the nose had many windows, giving full visibility. It had a non-retractable tailwheel undercarriage.

== Development ==
The first flight of the AB-80 took place on 23 June 1934. Only one unit was built.

== Specifications ==
SAB AB-80 side view

Data from Aviafrance

General characteristics

- Crew: four
- Length: 18.52 m (60 ft 9 in)
- Wingspan: 24 m (78 ft 9 in)
- Height: 6.10 m (20 ft 0 in)
- Wing area: 81.75 m^{2} (879.9 sq ft) including the central body area of 88 m^{2} (947 sq ft)
- Aspect ratio: 7
- Empty weight: 4,300 kg (9,480 lb)
- Gross weight: 8,100 kg (17,857 lb)
- Powerplant: 2 × Hispano-Suiza 12Ybrs V-12 water-cooled piston engine, 640 kW (860 hp) each
- Propellers: 3-bladed

Performance

- Maximum speed: 330 km/h (210 mph, 180 kn)
- Range: 1,100 km (680 mi, 590 nmi) with a 2,000 kg (4,400 lb) bombload
- Service ceiling: 8,000 m (26,000 ft)[all figures estimated]

Armament

- Bombs: maximum load 2,500 kg (5,500 lb)

== See also ==
Aircraft of comparable role, configuration, and era

- Breguet 410
- Bloch MB.130
- Farman F.420
- Potez 540

Related lists

- List of bomber aircraft
- List of Interwar military aircraft
