= Farman F.420 =

F.420
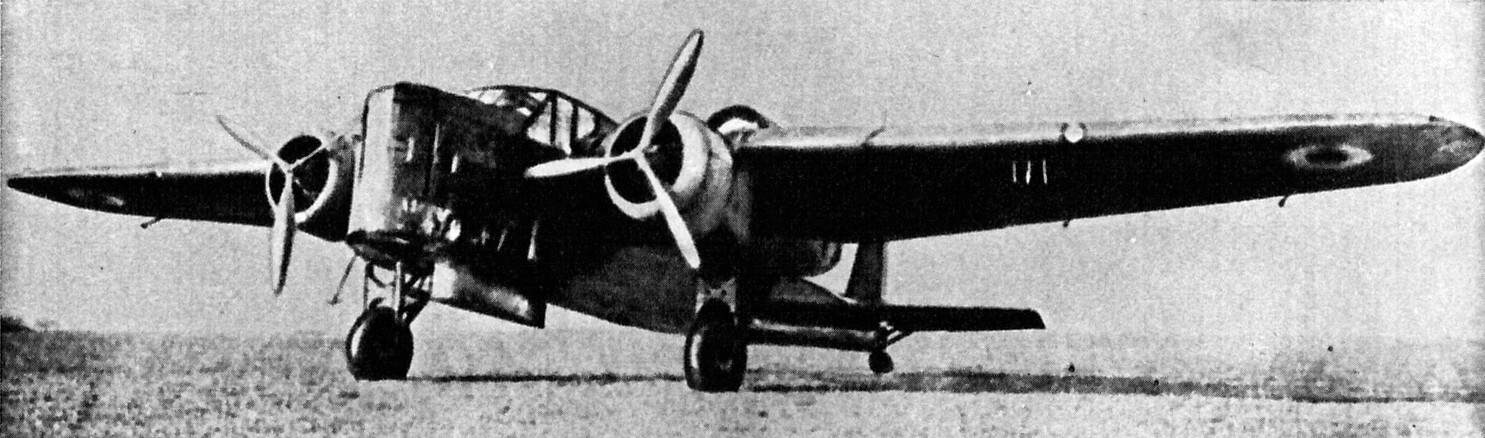

General information
- Type: Multi-role
- National origin: France
- Manufacturer: Farman, Boulogne-Billancourt
- Number built: 2

History
- First flight: 18 June 1934

The Farman F.420 was a twin engine monoplane, built in France in the mid-1930s to compete in a government contest for an aircraft capable of fulfilling bomber, fighter and reconnaissance roles. Two prototypes were constructed but no production followed.

== Design and development ==
In August 1933 the French Air Ministry issued a call for prototypes of a multirole class of aircraft, likely to be ordered in large numbers. The intention was to produce a machine which was competitive as a fighter, bomber and reconnaissance aircraft, so the class was known as BCR for de bombardement, de combat et de reconnaissance. An alternative description was Multiplace de Combat. Eight or nine manufacturers responded with an aircraft: the F.420 was Farman's candidate.

It was a wooden high wing twin engine aircraft. The cantilever wing had a parallel chord centre section in which fuel was carried and trapezoidal outer sections. The 740 hp (550 kW) Gnôme-Rhône 14 Kdrs radial engines, fitted with long-chord cowlings, were mounted to the underside of the wing in long housings, into which the main undercarriage members, each with a single mainwheel, retracted. The F.420 had a conventional undercarriage with a small tailwheel. There was a single fin and a braced tailplane set on top of the fuselage.

The fuselage was rectangular in cross-section, with a glazed cockpit just forward of the leading edge of the wing. Further forward the fuselage top and bottom remained flat and parallel, with the nose enclosed by full depth, single curvature glazing with positions for a gunner/ bomb aimer. There were two other machine gun positions, one ventral, one dorsal; the bomb load, depending on the distance of the target, was between 1000 kg and 1,400 kg (2,200-3,090 lb).

The F.420 flew for the first time on 18 June 1934, piloted by André Salel accompanied by the engineer Roger Robin. During its second flight, with the same crew, fire broke out in the wing, started by an engine exhaust. When flames spread to the fuselage, the two men attempted to bail out, only to find that the side door in the fuselage was too narrow to allow escape whilst wearing parachute packs; both died in the crash.

Farman funded a second F.420 which had prominent exhaust pipes from the tops of the engine housings leading back over the wings, which were locally protected from the heat by a metal covering. The nose was also reworked, incorporating a new turret and a large escape hatch. This aircraft was test flown at Villacoublay by an Air Ministry pilot in 1935 but did not win a production contract.

== Specifications ==
Data from Les avions Farman pp.230-1

General characteristics

- Crew: 3
- Length: 14.50 m (47 ft 7 in)
- Wingspan: 22.00 m (72 ft 2 in)
- Height: 3.50 m (11 ft 6 in)
- Wing area: 69.00 m^{2} (742.7 sq ft)
- Empty weight: 3,800 kg (8,378 lb)
- Gross weight: 6,900 kg (15,212 lb)
- Powerplant: 2 × Gnome-Rhône 14 Kdrs 14-cylinder double row radial, supercharged, 550 kW (740 hp) each
- Propellers: 3-bladed

Performance

- Maximum speed: 350 km/h (220 mph, 190 kn) at 4,000 m (13,000 ft)
- Range: 1,000 km (620 mi, 540 nmi)
- Service ceiling: 7,500 m (24,600 ft)

== See also ==
Aircraft of comparable role, configuration, and era

- Breguet 410
- Bloch MB.130
- Potez 540
- SAB AB-80

Related lists

- List of bomber aircraft
- List of Interwar military aircraft

== Bibliography ==
- Liron, Jean (1984). Les avions Farman. Collection Docavia. Vol. 21. Paris: Éditions Larivière. OCLC 37146471.
