= Potez 540 =

1933 French reconnaissance bomber aircraft

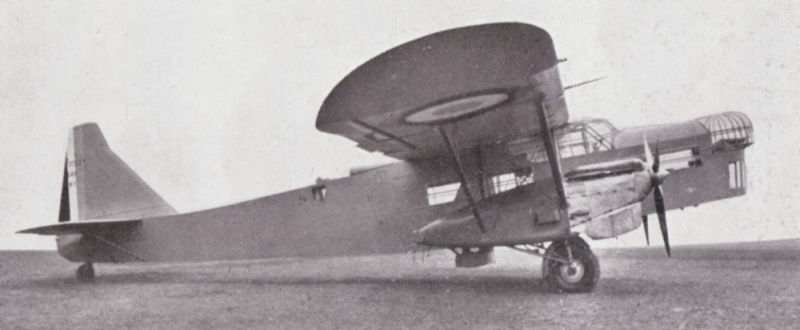
- Potez 54 fitted with 2 Hispano-Suiza 650 HP engines

General information
- Type: Reconnaissance/bomber
- Manufacturer: Potez
- Primary user: French Air Force; Spanish Republican Air Force
- Number built: 192

History
- Introduction date: 1934
- First flight: 14 November 1933

The Potez 540 was a French multi-role aircraft of the 1930s. Designed and built by Potez, it served with the French Air Force as a reconnaissance bomber, also serving with the Spanish Republican Air Force during the Spanish Civil War. Although obsolete as a bomber, it remained in service in support roles and in France's overseas colonies at the start of World War II.

== History ==
This two-engine aircraft was built by the French Potez company to fulfill a 1932 specification for a new reconnaissance bomber. Built as a private venture, this aircraft, designated the Potez 54, flew for the first time on 14 November 1933. Designed by Louis Coroller, it was intended as a four-seat aircraft capable of performing duties such as bomber, transport and long-range reconnaissance. The Potez 54 was a high-wing monoplane, of mixed wood and metal covering over a steel tube frame. The prototype had twin fins and rudders, and was powered by two 515 kW (690 hp) Hispano-Suiza 12Xbrs V-12 engines in streamlined nacelles, which were connected to the fuselage by stub wings. The main landing gear units retracted into the nacelles, and auxiliary bomb racks were mounted beneath the stub wings. There were manually operated turrets at the nose and dorsal positions, as well as a semi-retractable dustbin-style ventral turret. During development, the original tailplane was replaced by a single fin and rudder, and in this form, the type was re-designated the Potez 540 and delivered to the Armee de I'Air on 25 November 1934. A total of 192 Potez 540s were built.

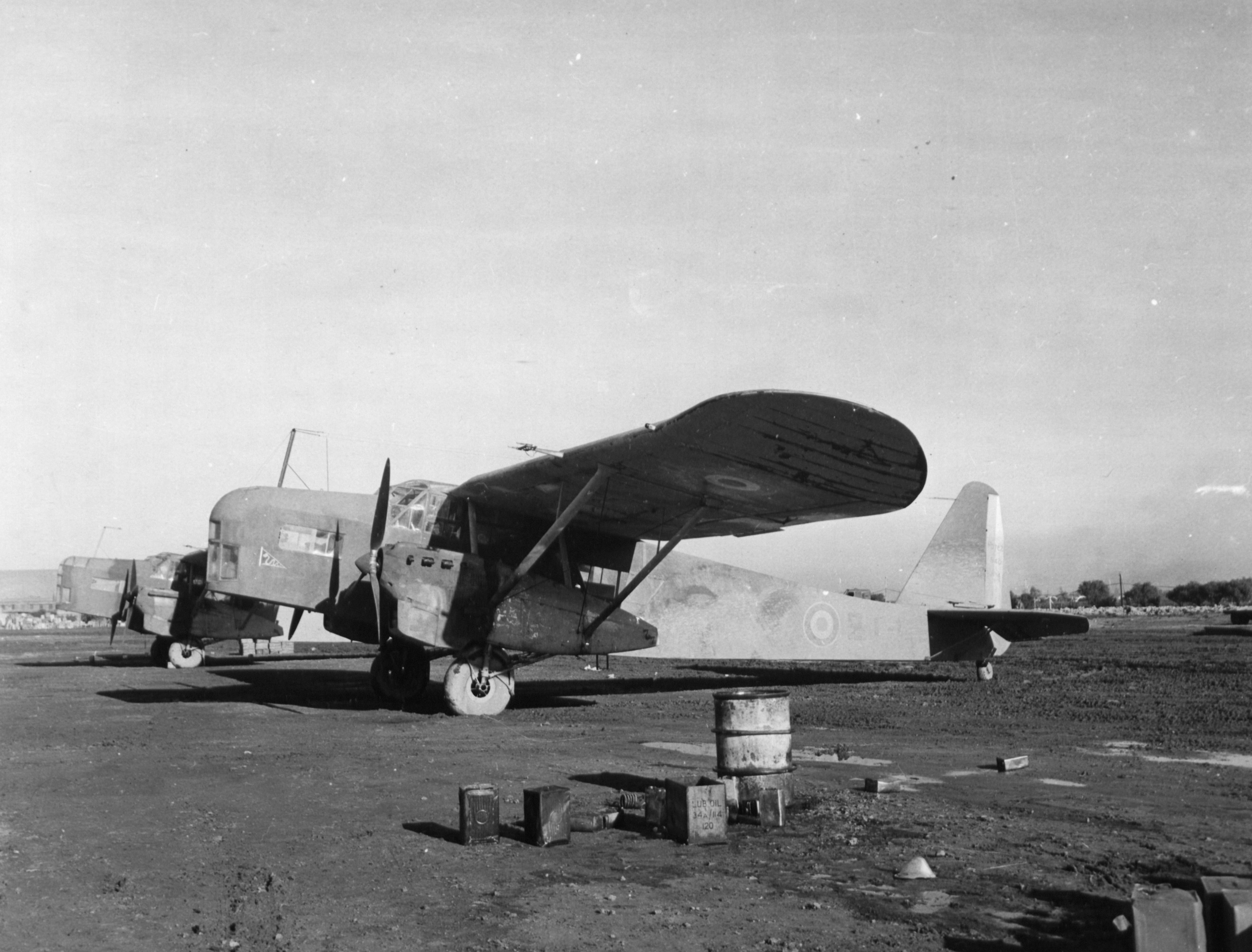
French Potez 540s in North Africa in January 1943

Their first combat was in the Spanish Civil War, where they were employed by the Spanish loyalist side. A poor design that was already obsolete just two years after its introduction, when confronted by the higher performance German and Italian planes of the same period, the Potez 540 proved itself a failure in Spanish skies during the Civil War and was labelled as 'Flying Coffin' (Spanish: Ataúd Volante) by Spanish Republican pilots. In the late 1930s, these aircraft were becoming obsolete so they were withdrawn from reconnaissance and bombing duties and were relegated to French transport units. They were also employed as paratrooper training and transport aircraft. By September 1939 and the beginning of World War II, they had been largely transferred to the French colonies in North Africa, where they continued to function in transport and paratrooper service. Their role in even these secondary assignments was problematic given their poor defensive armament and vulnerability to modern enemy fighters. Following the French capitulation to Germany in June 1940, those Potez 540s still flying served the Vichy French Air Force mainly in the French overseas colonies. Most of these machines were retired or destroyed by late 1943.

== Variants ==
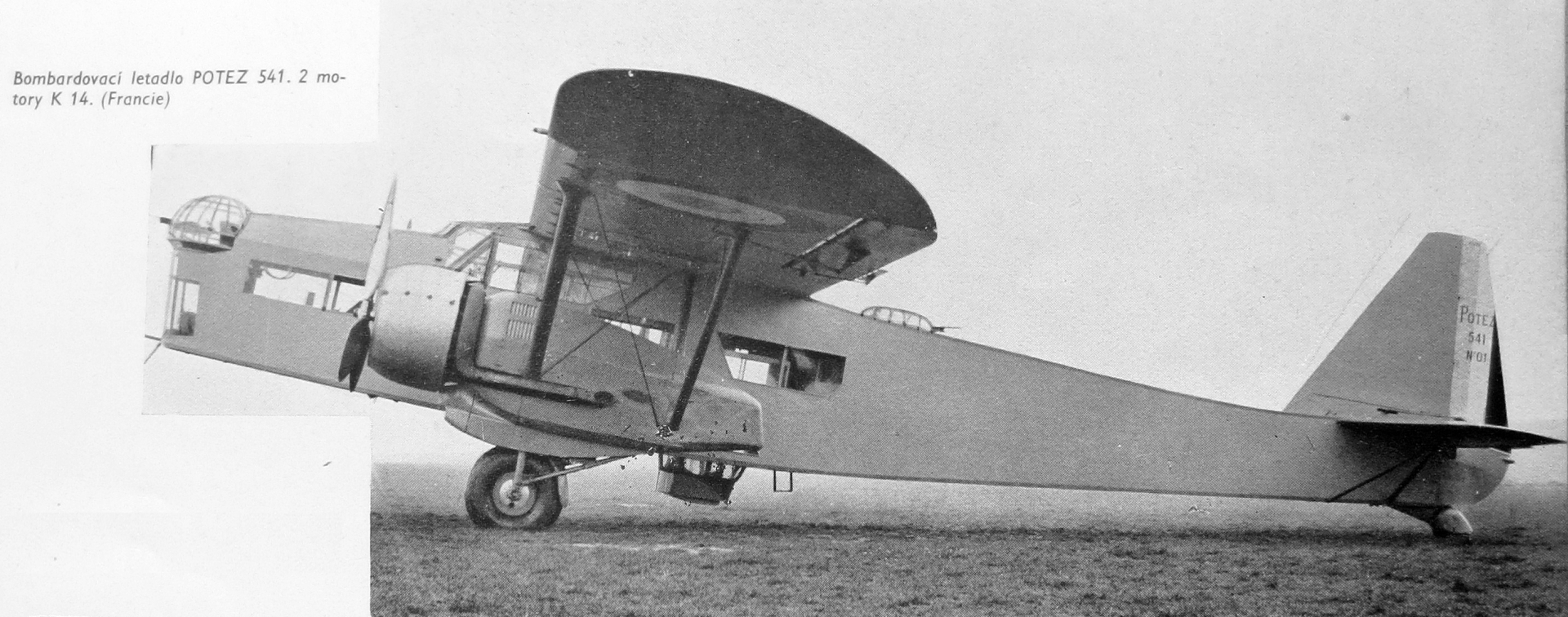
Potez 541

Potez 54
One prototype, later converted (with twin tails) into the Potez 540 No. 1.
Potez 540
Production aircraft with 1 each of 590 kW (790 hp) Hispano-Suiza 12Xirs and 12Xjrs, (left and right hand rotation), V-12 inline engines. 185 built. Used by France and Spain.
Potez 541
540 re-engined with 640 kW (860 hp) Gnome-Rhône 14Kdrs radial engines. One converted from a 540.
Potez 542
Derivative of 540 powered by 540 kW (720 hp) Lorraine 12Hfrs Pétrel V-12 engines. 74 built. Used by France and Spain.
Potez 543
Production derivative of Potez 541, powered by 640 kW (860 hp) Gnome-Rhône 14Kdrs radial engines. 10 built for Romania, only eight were delivered and four were diverted to Spain for use by Spanish Republicans.

== Operators ==
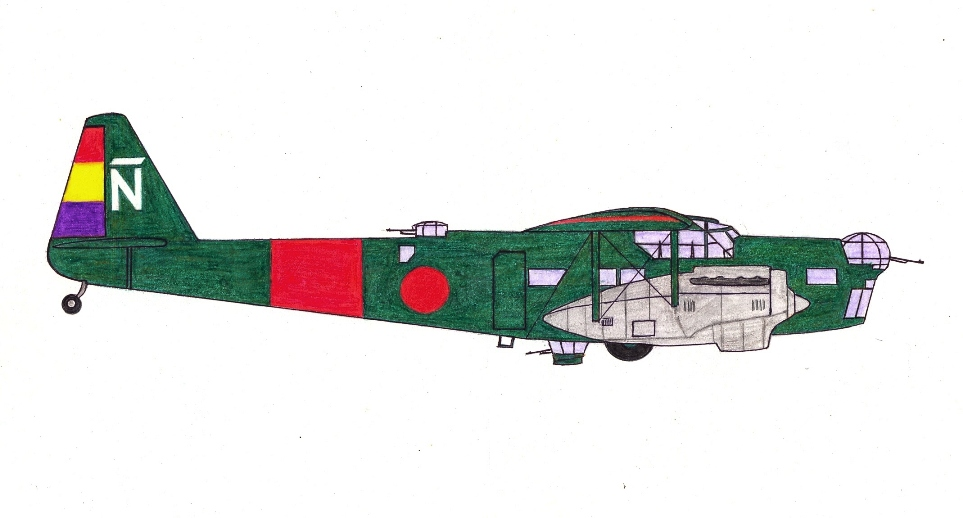
Serial 'Ñ' Potez 542 of the Spanish Republican Air Force. Its crash would inspire French writer André Malraux to make a movie named L'Espoir.

France

- Armée de l'Air
- French Navy

Italy

- Regia Aeronautica

Romania

- Royal Romanian Air Force

(Spain) Spanish Republic

- Spanish Republican Air Force

== Specifications (Potez 540) ==
Potez 540

General characteristics

- Crew: 4 to 7 (dependent on whether functioning as transport or bomber)
- Length: 16.2 m (53 ft 2 in)
- Wingspan: 22.1 m (72 ft 6 in)
- Height: 3.88 m (12 ft 9 in)
- Wing area: 76 m^{2} (820 sq ft)
- Empty weight: 3,785 kg (8,344 lb)
- Gross weight: 5,950 kg (13,118 lb)
- Powerplant: 2 × Hispano-Suiza 12Xirs V-12 liquid-cooled piston engines, 515 kW (691 hp) each (left hand rotation)

Performance

- Maximum speed: 310 km/h (190 mph, 170 kn) at 3,962 m (12,999 ft)
- Range: 1,250 km (780 mi, 670 nmi)
- Service ceiling: 10,000 m (33,000 ft)

Armament

- Guns: 3–5 × 7.5 mm (0.295 in) MAC 1934 machine guns in flexible nose, dorsal, and ventral positions
- Bombs: 4 × 225 kg (496 lb) bombs on external racks or 10 × 55 kg (121 lbs)

== See also ==
Aircraft of comparable role, configuration, and era

- LWS-6 Żubr
- SAB AB-80

Related lists

- List of Interwar military aircraft
- List of aircraft of World War II
- List of aircraft of the Spanish Republican Air Force

== Bibliography ==
- Barra, Francis (November 1996). "Courrier Lecteurs" [Readers Mail]. Avions: Toute l'aéronautique et son histoire (in French) (44): 2. ISSN 1243-8650.
- Bernad, Dénes; Cortet, Pierre & Coroller, Jean-Louis (October 1996). "La Saga des Potez 54 (fin): les Potez 541/543, variantes roumaines à moteurs en étoile" [The Story of the Potez 54: The Potez 541/543, Romanian variants and radial engines]. Avions: Toute l'aéronautique et son histoire (in French) (43): 16–21. ISSN 1243-8650.
- Cortet, Pierre & Coroller, Jean-Louis (December 1995). "Le Potez 540 (1^{e} partie)". Avions: Toute l'aéronautique et son histoire (in French) (33): 24–28. ISSN 1243-8650.
- Cortet, Pierre & Coroller, Jean-Louis (January 1996). "Le Potez 540 (2^{e} partie)". Avions: Toute l'aéronautique et son histoire (in French) (34): 17–22. ISSN 1243-8650.
- Cortet, Pierre & Coroller, Jean-Louis (February 1996). "Le Potez 540 (3^{e} partie)". Avions: Toute l'aéronautique et son histoire (in French) (35): 28–34. ISSN 1243-8650.
- Cortet, Pierre & Coroller, Jean-Louis (March 1996). "Le Potez 540 (4^{e} partie)". Avions: Toute l'aéronautique et son histoire (in French) (36): 7–10. ISSN 1243-8650.
- Cortet, Pierre & Coroller, Jean-Louis (April 1996). "Le Potez 540 (5^{e} partie)". Avions: Toute l'aéronautique et son histoire (in French) (37): 10–16. ISSN 1243-8650.
- Cortet, Pierre & Coroller, Jean-Louis (September 1996). "Le Potez 540/542 (dernière partie)". Avions: Toute l'aéronautique et son histoire (in French) (42): 7–13. ISSN 1243-8650.
- Cortet, Pierre & Coroller, Jean-Louis (July 1996). "Le Potez 542 (2ème partie)". Avions: Toute l'aéronautique et son histoire (in French) (40): 19–22. ISSN 1243-8650.
- Cortet, Pierre & Coroller, Jean-Louis (August 1996). "Le Potez 54 au service de l'Espagne Républicaine" [The Potez 54 in Spanish Republican Service]. Avions: Toute l'aéronautique et son histoire (in French) (41): 15–18. ISSN 1243-8650.
- Ledet, Michel (June 1996). "Le Potez 542 (1ère partie)". Avions: Toute l'aéronautique et son histoire (in French) (39): 28–32. ISSN 1243-8650.
- Mombeek, Eric (May 2001). "Les trésors de Cazaux" [The Treasures of Cazaux]. Avions: Toute l'Aéronautique et son histoire (in French) (98): 44–47. ISSN 1243-8650.
- Morareau, Lucien (May 1996). "Les Potez 54 de la Marine" [The Naval Potez 54s]. Avions: Toute l'aéronautique et son histoire (in French) (38): 20–22. ISSN 1243-8650.
- Young, Edward M. (1984). "France's Forgotten Air War". Air Enthusiast. No. 25. pp. 22–33. ISSN 0143-5450.
