= Farman F.430 =

F.430
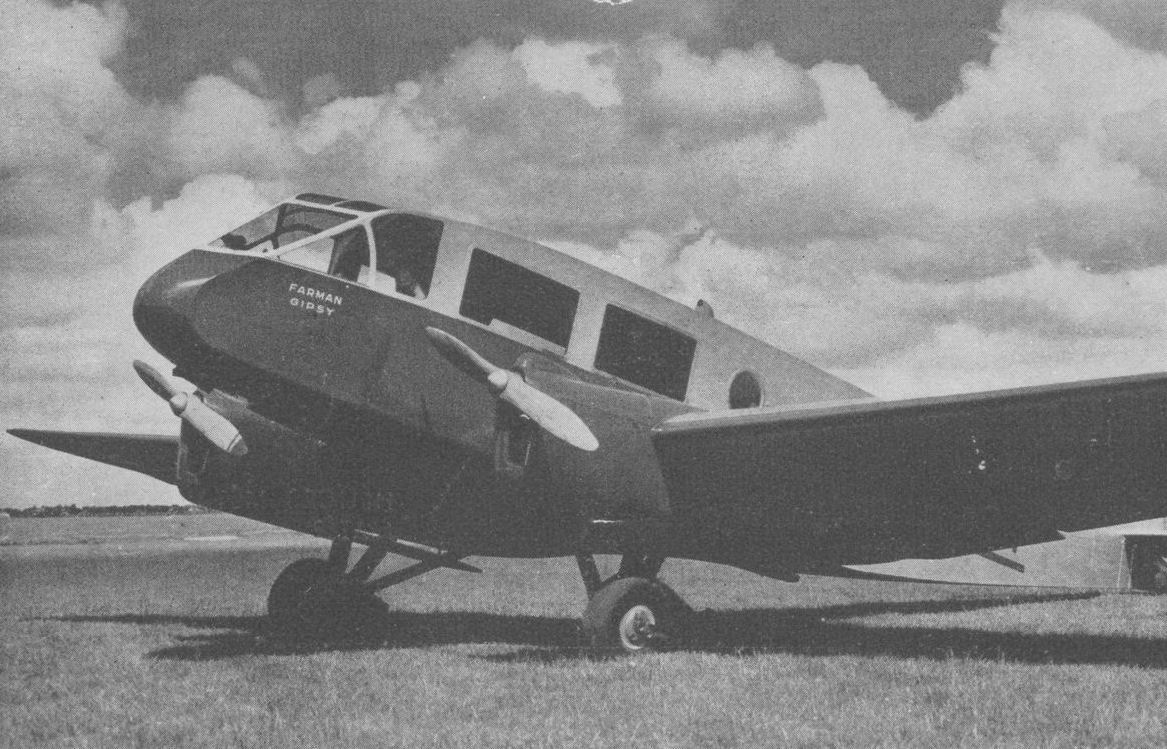

General information
- Type: Light transport monoplane
- Manufacturer: Farman Aviation Works
- Number built: 7

History
- First flight: 1934

The Farman F.430 was a 1930s French light transport designed and built by the Farman Aviation Works. Two variants with different engines were known as the F.431 and F.432.

== Design and development ==
The F.430 was a low-wing cantilever monoplane with a tail-wheel landing gear. It was powered by two wing-mounted de Havilland Gipsy Major piston engines. The enclosed cockpit and cabin had room for a pilot and five passengers. The prototype F-ANBY appeared in 1934 and the F.431 variant with 180 hp (130 kW) Renault Bengali-Six inverted piston engines was exhibited at the 1934 Paris Salon de l'Aeronautique. A further variant with 180 hp (130 kW) Farman radial engines was designated the F.432.

After the company had been nationalised and became part of SNCAC a variant with a retractable landing gear (designated the Centre 433) was completed, and flown for the first time in December 1938. The F.430 and two F.431s were used by Air Service between Paris and Biarritz.

== Variants ==
F.430
Prototype with 130 hp (97 kW) de Havilland Gipsy Major I inline piston engines, one built.
F.431
Variant with 180 hp (130 kW) Renault 6Pdi inverted piston engines, three built.
F.432
Variant with 180 hp (130 kW) Farman radial engines or Renault 6Q-06 engines, two built and two converted from F.431s.
Centre 433
Retractable landing gear version of the F.431, powered by 220 hp (160 kW) Renault 6Q-06/Renault 6Q-O7 engines (left and right hand rotation), one built.

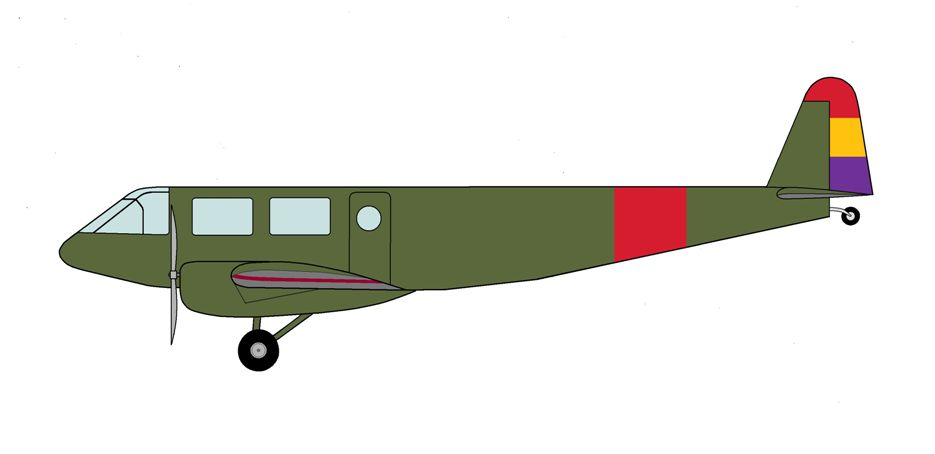
Farman F.430 of the Spanish Republican Air Force

== Operators ==
France

- Air Service

Spain

- Spanish Republican Air Force

== Specifications (F.431) ==
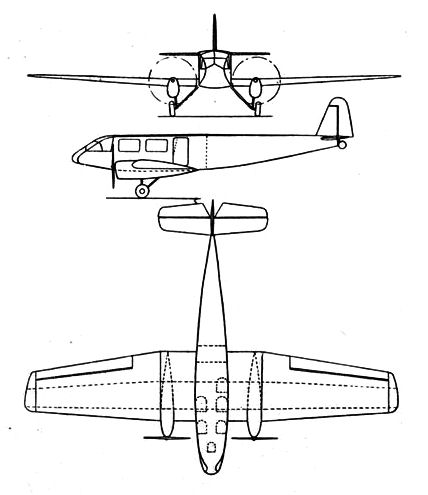
Farman F.430 3-view drawing from L'Aerophile August 1934

Data from Parmentier, Bruno (18 September 2017). "Farman F-431 1935 Transport civil".

General characteristics

- Crew: One
- Capacity: Five passengers
- Length: 12.06 m (39 ft 7 in)
- Wingspan: 15.45 m (50 ft 8 in)
- Height: 2.82 m (9 ft 3 in)
- Wing area: 36.11 m^{2} (388.7 sq ft)
- Empty weight: 1,573 kg (3,468 lb)
- Gross weight: 2,666 kg (5,878 lb)
- Powerplant: 2 × Renault 6Pdi 6-cylinder inverted inline piston, 134 kW (180 hp) each
- Propellers: 2-bladed

Performanceat sea level

  - 000 km/h (0 mph; 0 kn) at 1,000 m (3,300 ft)
- Cruise speed: 230 km/h (140 mph, 120 kn) at sea level
- Range: 980 km (610 mi, 530 nmi)
- Service ceiling: 5,300 m (17,400 ft)

== See also ==
Aircraft of comparable role, configuration, and era

- Airspeed Envoy
- Avro 652
- Caproni Ca.308 Borea
- Potez 56

Related lists

- List of aircraft of the Spanish Republican Air Force
