= Lorraine 5P =

1920s French piston aircraft engine

5P
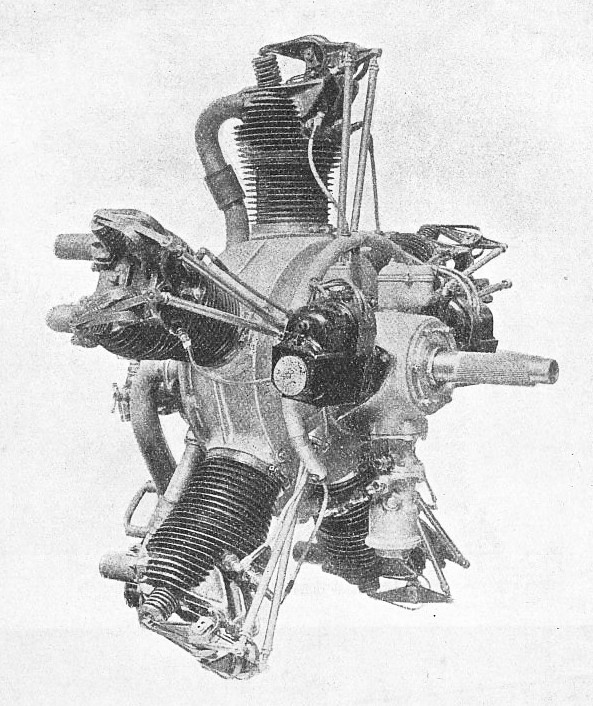
- Type: 5-cylinder air-cooled piston aero engine
- National origin: France
- Manufacturer: Lorraine-Dietrich

The Lorraine 5P, also called the Lorraine 100CV, Lorraine 110CV and Lorraine 120CV, was a family of five-cylinder air-cooled radial engines designed and built in France by Lorraine-Dietrich during the 1920s and 1930s. Nominal engine powers were given as 100–110–120 hp (75–82–89 kW) at 1250 / 1400 / 1350 rpm (maximum continuous power), with maximum outputs of 108–125–150 hp (81–93–112 kW) at 1350 / 1650 / 1700 rpm.

== Variants ==
5Pa
also called the Lorraine 100CV, 8.59 litres (524.19 cu in) (125x140)
5Pb
also called the Lorraine 110CV, 8.59 litres (524.19 cu in) (125x140)
5Pc
also called the Lorraine 120CV, 9.3 litres (567.52 cu in) (130x140)

== Applications ==
- Bloch 61
- Caudron C.221
- Dewoitine 481
- FBA 310 (5Pc)
- SAB DB-81
- Caproni Ca.97

== Specifications (5Pc) ==
Data from Societe Generale Aeronautique

=== General characteristics ===
- Type: 5-cylinder air-cooled radial piston engine, left hand rotation (facing the propeller)
- Bore: 130 mm (5.12 in)
- Stroke: 140 mm (5.51 in)
- Displacement: 9.3 L (567.52 cu in)
- Length: 970 mm (38.19 in)
- Diameter: 1,125 mm (44.29 in)
- Dry weight: 156.35 kg (344.7 lb)

=== Components ===
- Valvetrain: pushrod operated overhead valves, two per cylinder
- Oil system: pressure fed
- Cooling system: air-cooled

=== Performance ===
- Power output: 150 hp (110 kW) at 1700 rpm (maximum)
  120 hp (89 kW) at 1350 rpm (maximum continuous)
- Compression ratio: 5.25
- Specific fuel consumption: 0.282 kg/(kW h) (0.463 lb/(hp h))
- Oil consumption: 0.0107 kg/(kW h) (0.0176 lb/(hp h))
