= Águas de São Pedro =

Municipality in Southeast, Brazil

- Municipality
- Municipality of the Hydromineral Spa of Águas de São Pedro; Município da Estância Hidromineral de Águas de São Pedro
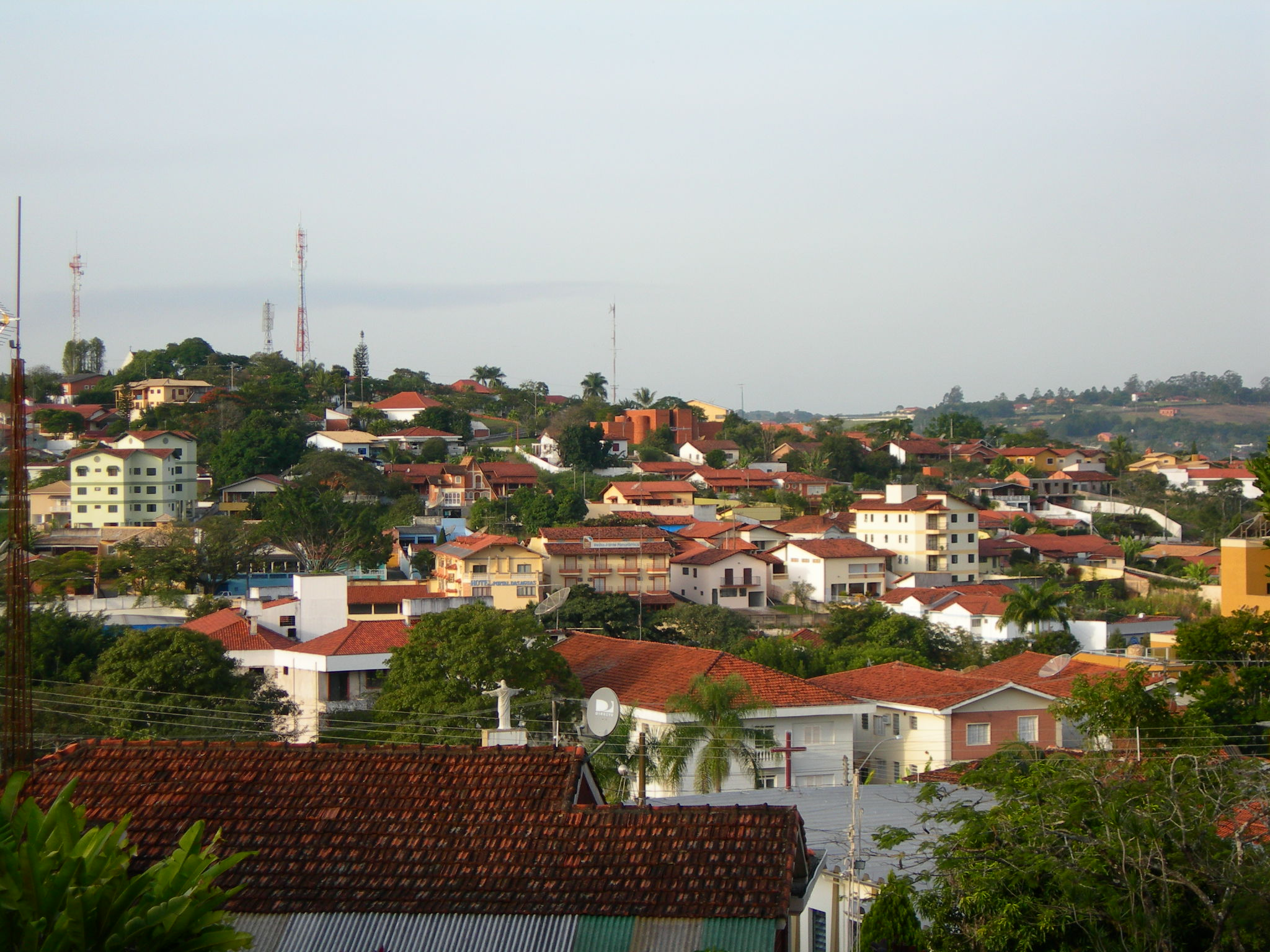
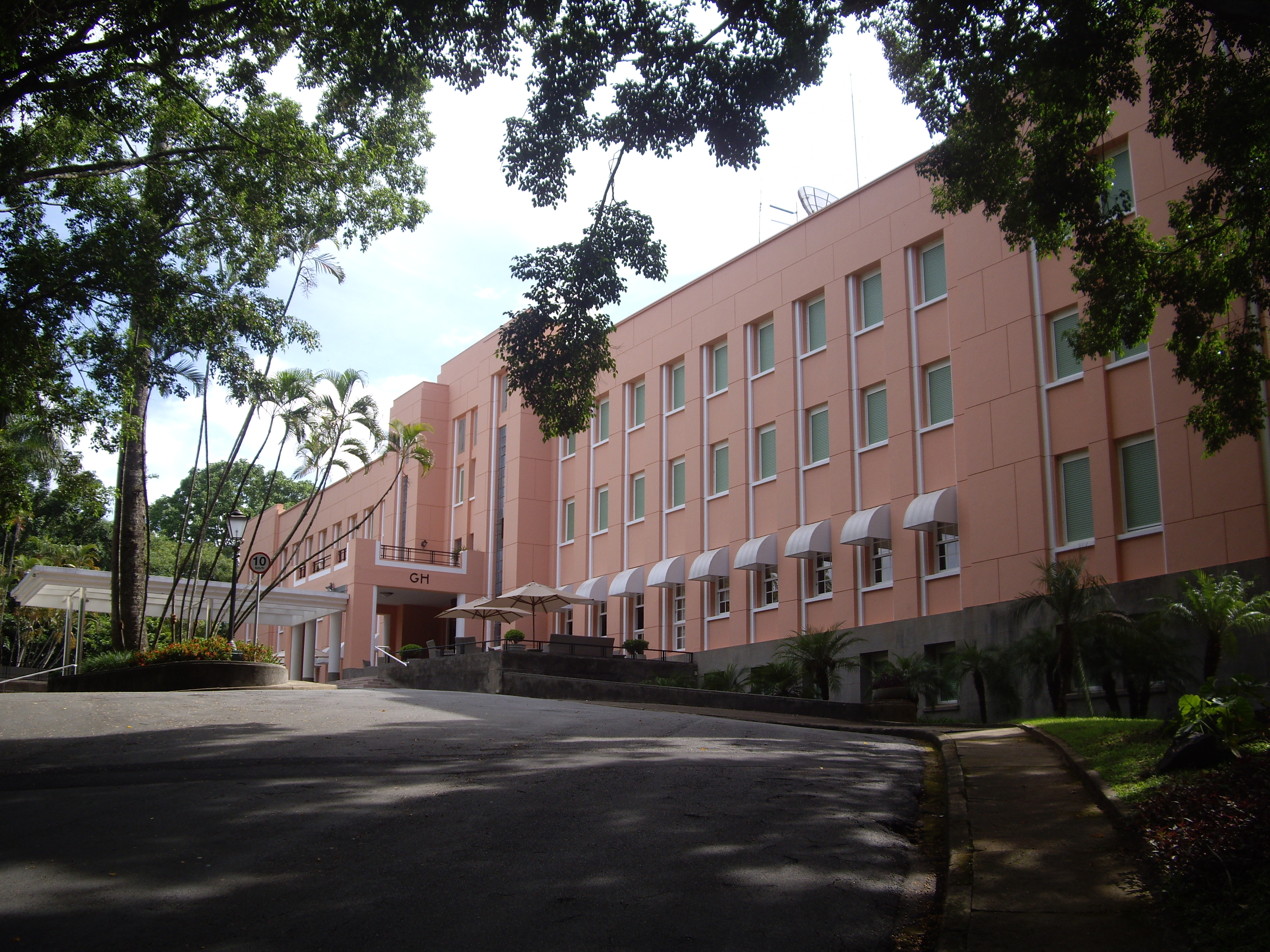
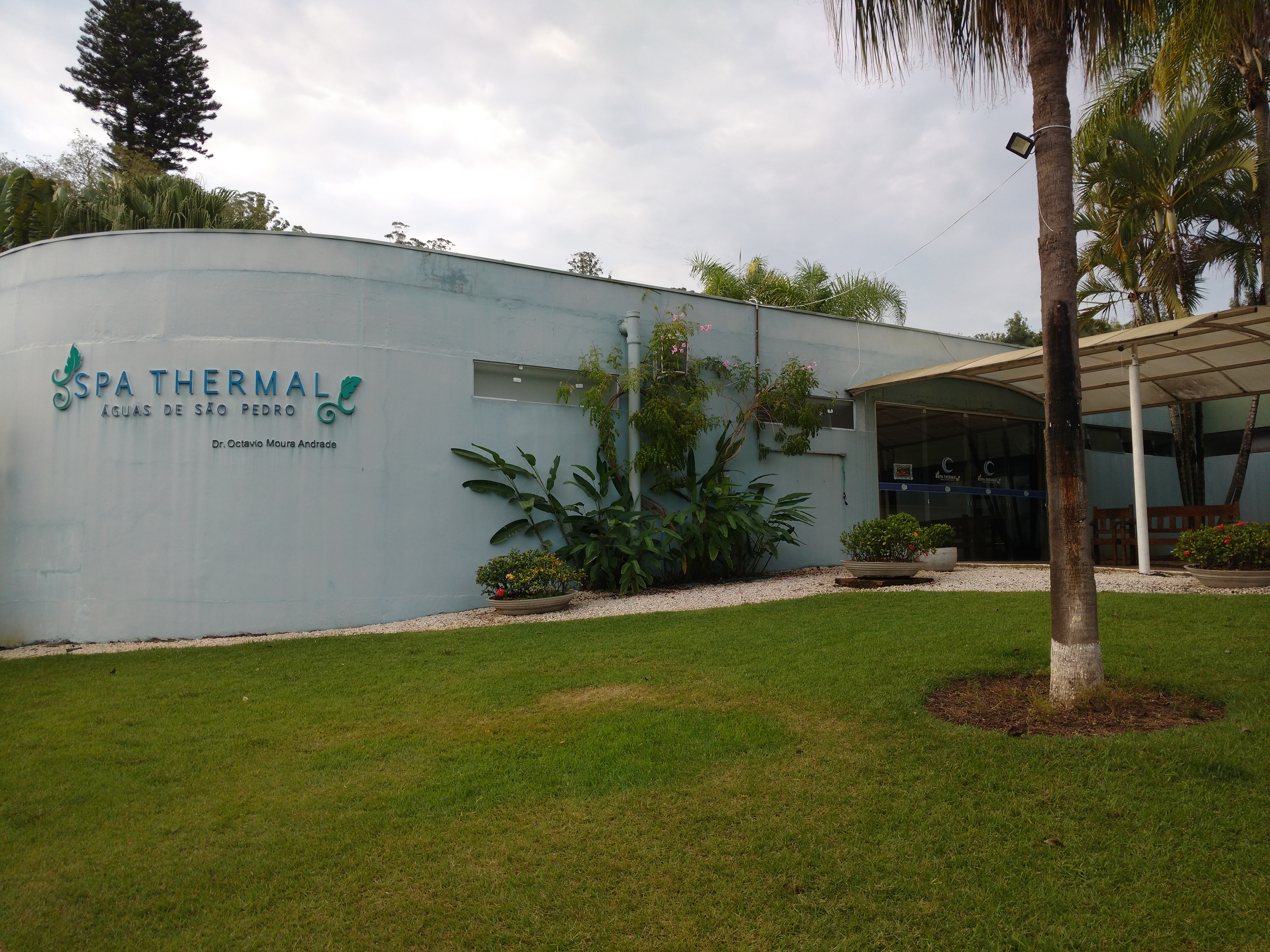
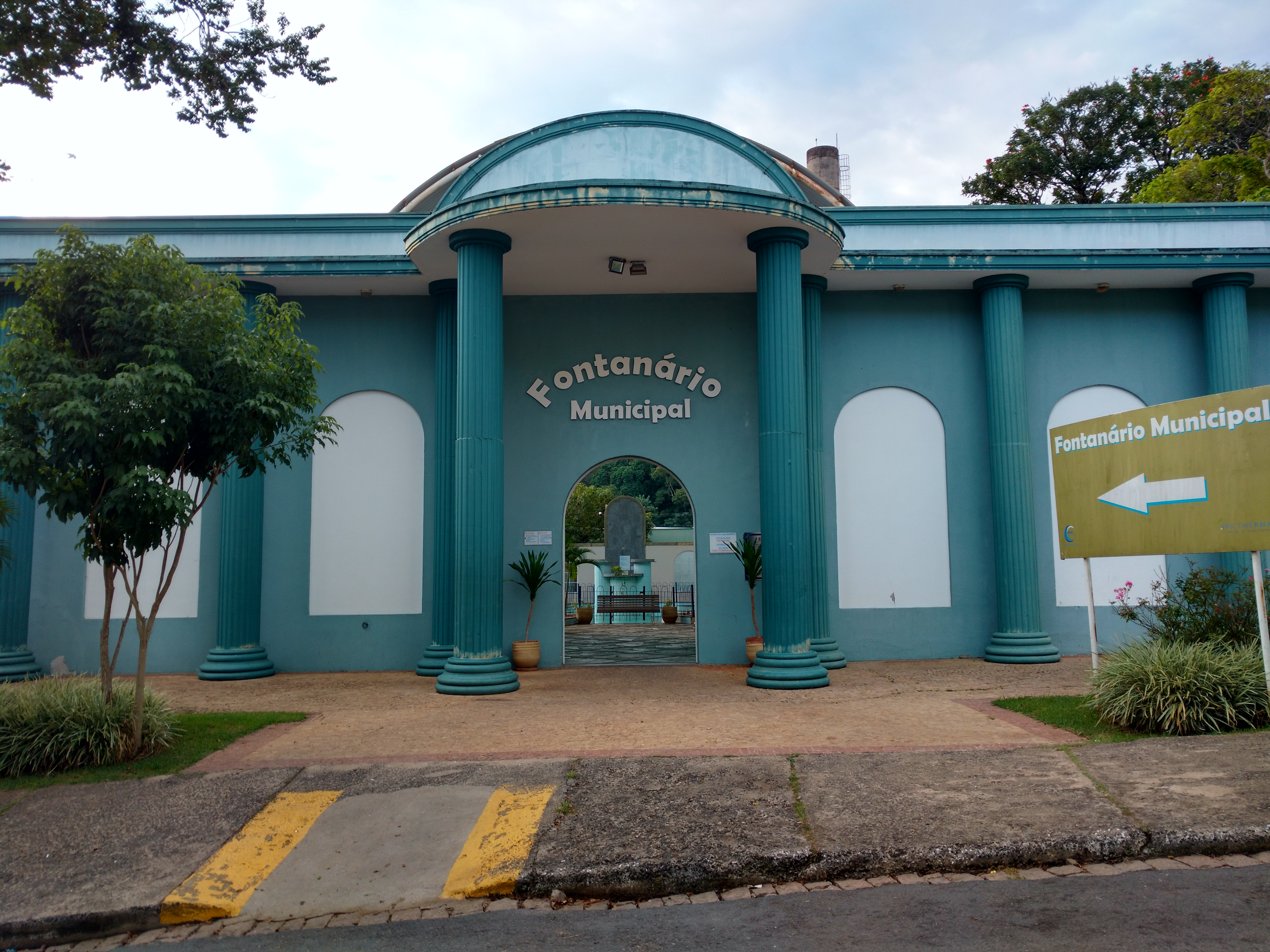
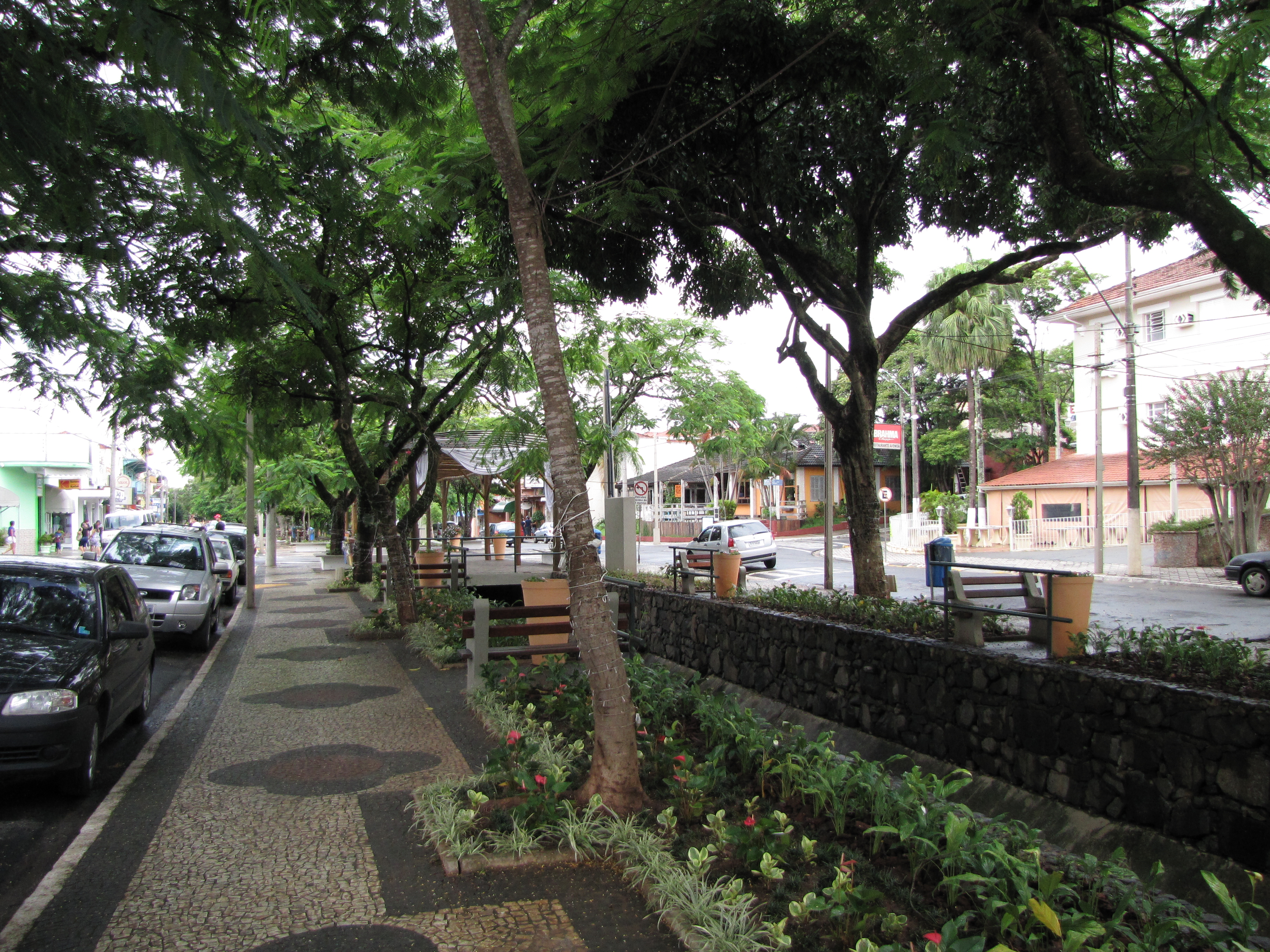
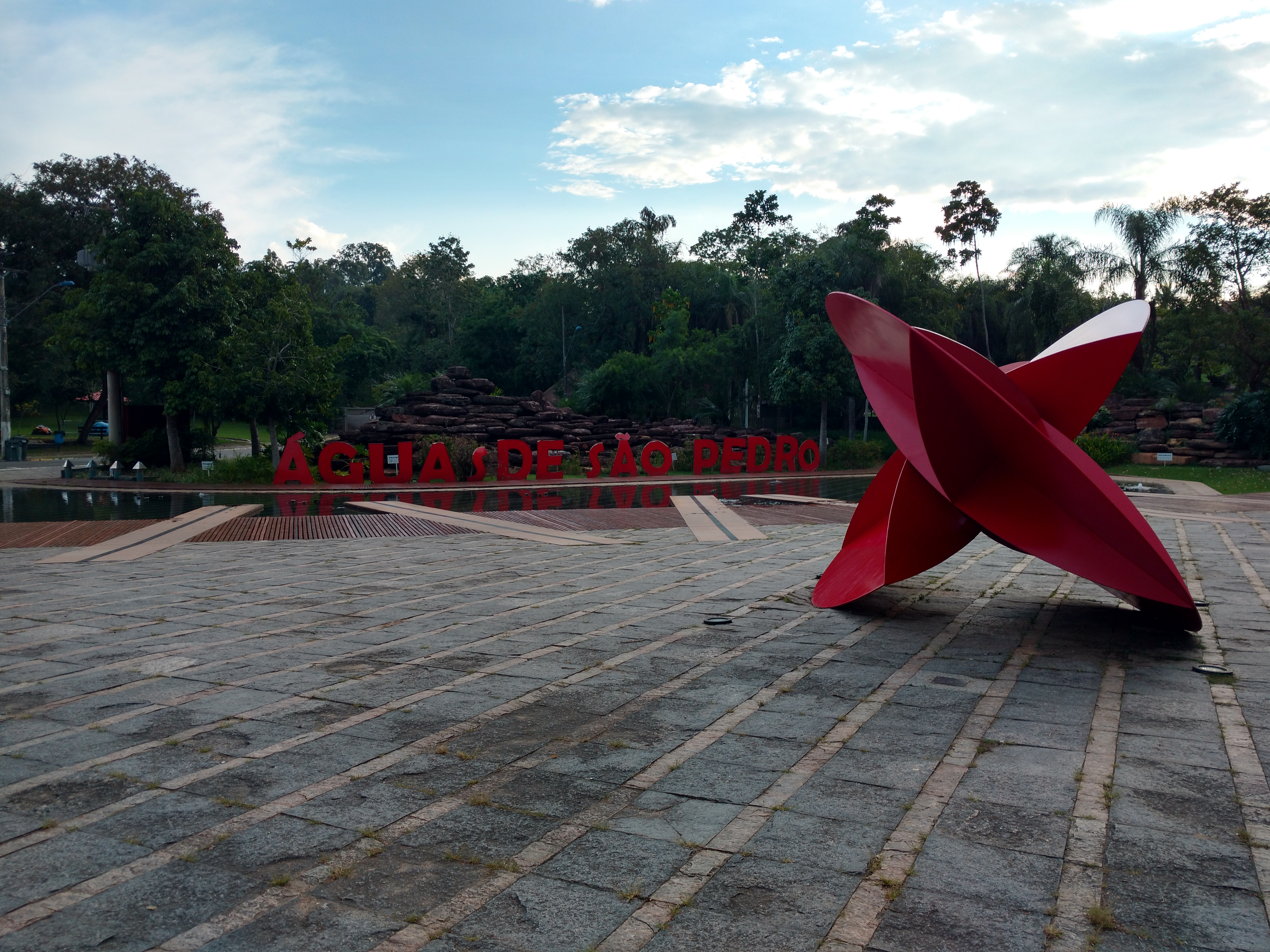
- From the top, going left to right: Midtown and Jardim Iporanga neighborhood, Grande Hotel São Pedro, the municipal bath house, the municipal fountain, the main street of the municipality, and the Octavio Moura Andrade Square

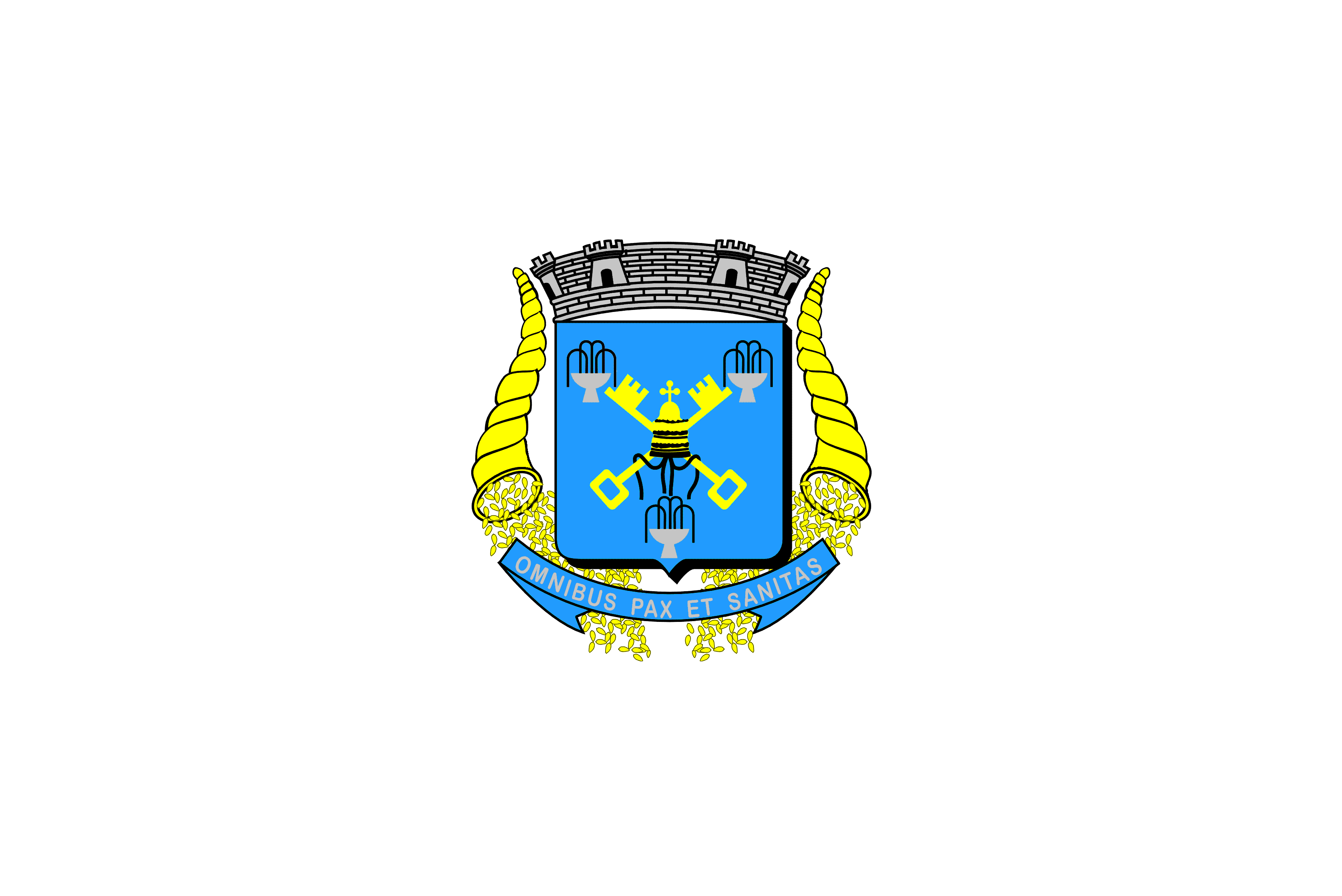
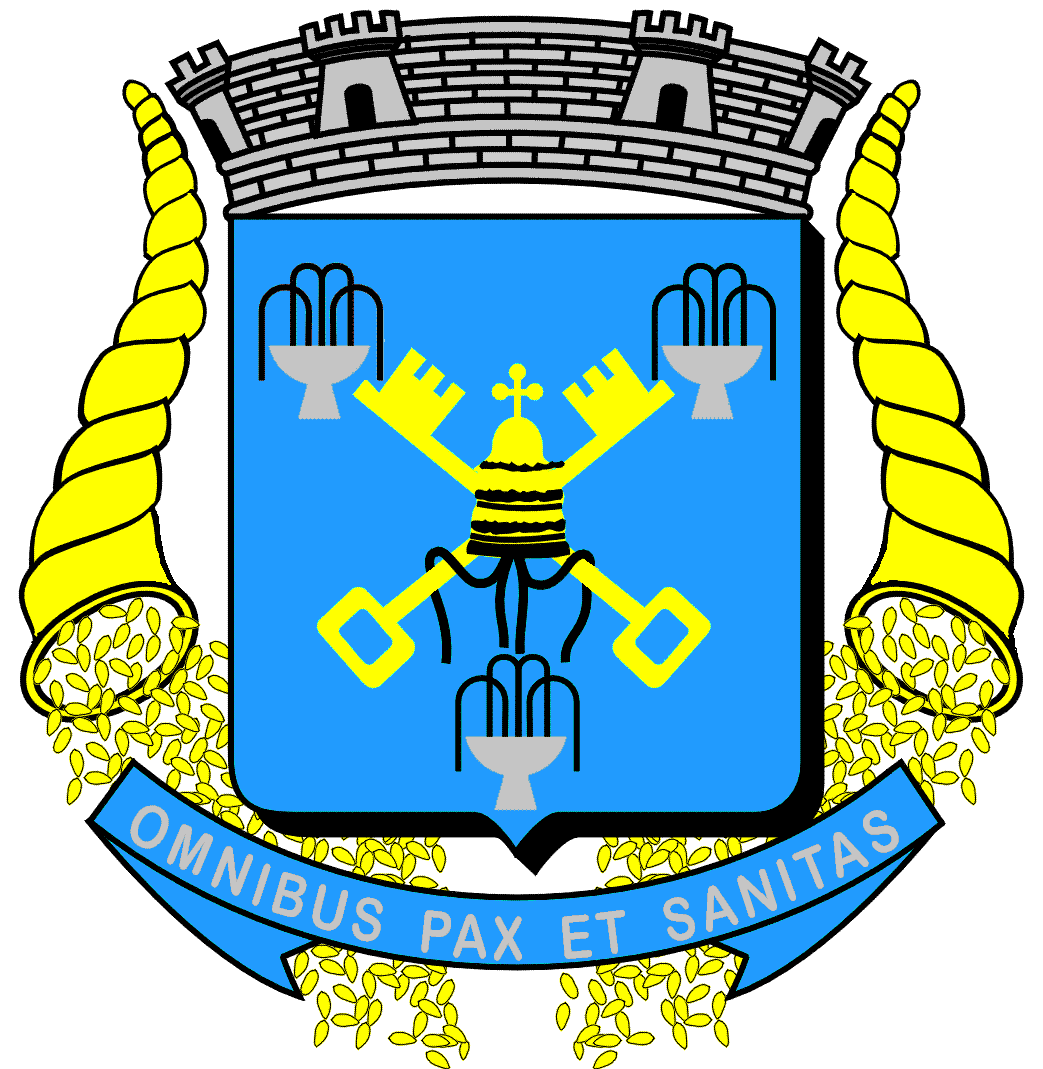
- Flag Coat of arms Logo
- Nickname: Águas
- Motto: Omnibus Pax et Sanitas (Latin for Peace and Health for Everyone)
- Anthem: Hino a Águas de São Pedro
- Interactive map outlining Águas de São Pedro
- Location within the State of São Paulo Location within Brazil Location within South America
- Coordinates: 22°36′00″S 47°52′30″W
- Country: Brazil
- Region: Southeast
- State: São Paulo
- Founded: 25 July 1940
- Incorporated: 24 December 1948
- Founder: Octavio Moura Andrade
- Named for: Saint Peter and São Pedro

Government
  - Mayor: Paulo Sergio Barboza de Lima (PSDB)
  - City council: Members: Anderson Cardoso Teixeira (PR); Célio do Nascimento (PSD); Edilene Cristina Lacerda Fernandes Alarcon (DEM); Manoel Azevedo Noronha Filho (PT); Marcelo da Silva Bueno (PSD); Maria de Fátima Scaranelo (PSDB); Rubens Aparecido Antunes (PSDB); Valdir Aparecido Gibim (PRB); Valter Leandro Ferreira (PPS)

Area
  - Municipality: 3.612 km^{2} (1.395 sq mi)
  - Urban: 3.612 km^{2} (1.395 sq mi)
- Elevation: 515.24 m (1,690.4 ft)

Population
  - Estimate (2022): 2.780
  - Rank: 5,199th, Brazil
  - Density: 76,966/km^{2} (199,340/sq mi)
- Demonym: água-pedrense

Ethnicity
  - White: 87.22% (2,361 inhabitants)
  - Multiracial: 10.31% (279 inhabitants)
  - Black: 1.51% (41 inhabitants)
  - Asian: 0.96% (26 inhabitants)
- Time zone: UTC−3 (BRT)
- Postal codes: 13525-001–13529-999
- Area code: 19
- HDI (2010): 0.854 – very high
- Website: Official website

Águas de São Pedro (Brazilian Portuguese pronunciation: [ˈaɡwɐz dʒi sɐ̃w ˈpedɾu]) is a Brazilian municipality in the state of São Paulo located 184 kilometres (114 miles) from the state capital. (Note: Queried data in the online system (Web Routes) of the Department of Highways (Portuguese: Departamento de Estradas de Rodagem) of the Logistics and Transport Secretariat of the State of São Paulo.) At only 3.61 square kilometres (1.39 square miles), it is the second-smallest Brazilian municipality in terms of area, and had an estimated population of 3,521 as of 2020. Águas de São Pedro means "Waters of Saint Peter". Its name is derived from the mineral springs in its territory and their location, which before the city's founding were part of the municipality of São Pedro (Saint Peter).

The average annual temperature in the city is 22.4 degrees Celsius (72.3 degrees Fahrenheit), and most of the municipality's vegetation consists of reforested area. In 2016 there were 2,491 vehicles in the city. Exclusively an urban area, with no rural areas, the city had four health facilities in 2009. Its Human Development Index (HDI) is 0.854, the second highest in the state of São Paulo, as well as the second highest in Brazil, surpassed only by São Caetano do Sul.

Águas de São Pedro was incorporated in the 1940s. The city is known for its mineral waters of medicinal value, their natural sources popular tourist attractions. One of the springs, Fonte Juventude, has the second most highly sulfurous water in the world. It also has two large parks, Dr. Octavio Moura Andrade Park and the Parque das Águas "José Benedito Zani", and the municipal mini-garden, all important green areas of the city.

The municipality is located in the region of Itaqueri Ridge – Portuguese: Serra do Itaqueri; Itaqueri means "lying stone" in Tupí–Guaraní – in the south-central part of the state of São Paulo. It is a planned city and since its founding has been a tourist destination.

== History ==
=== Origins ===
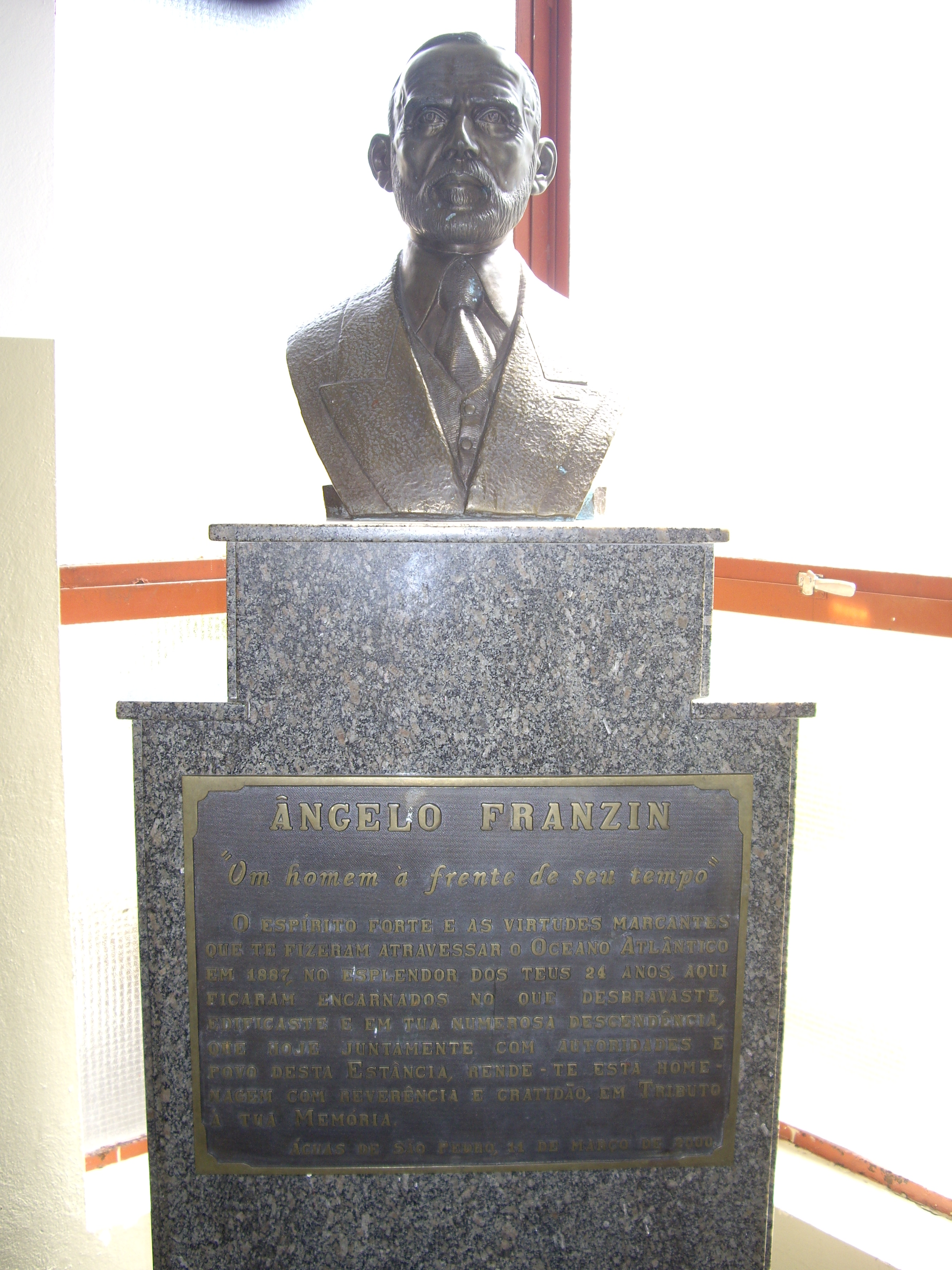
Bust of the owner of the land that would become Águas de São Pedro, Angelo Franzin

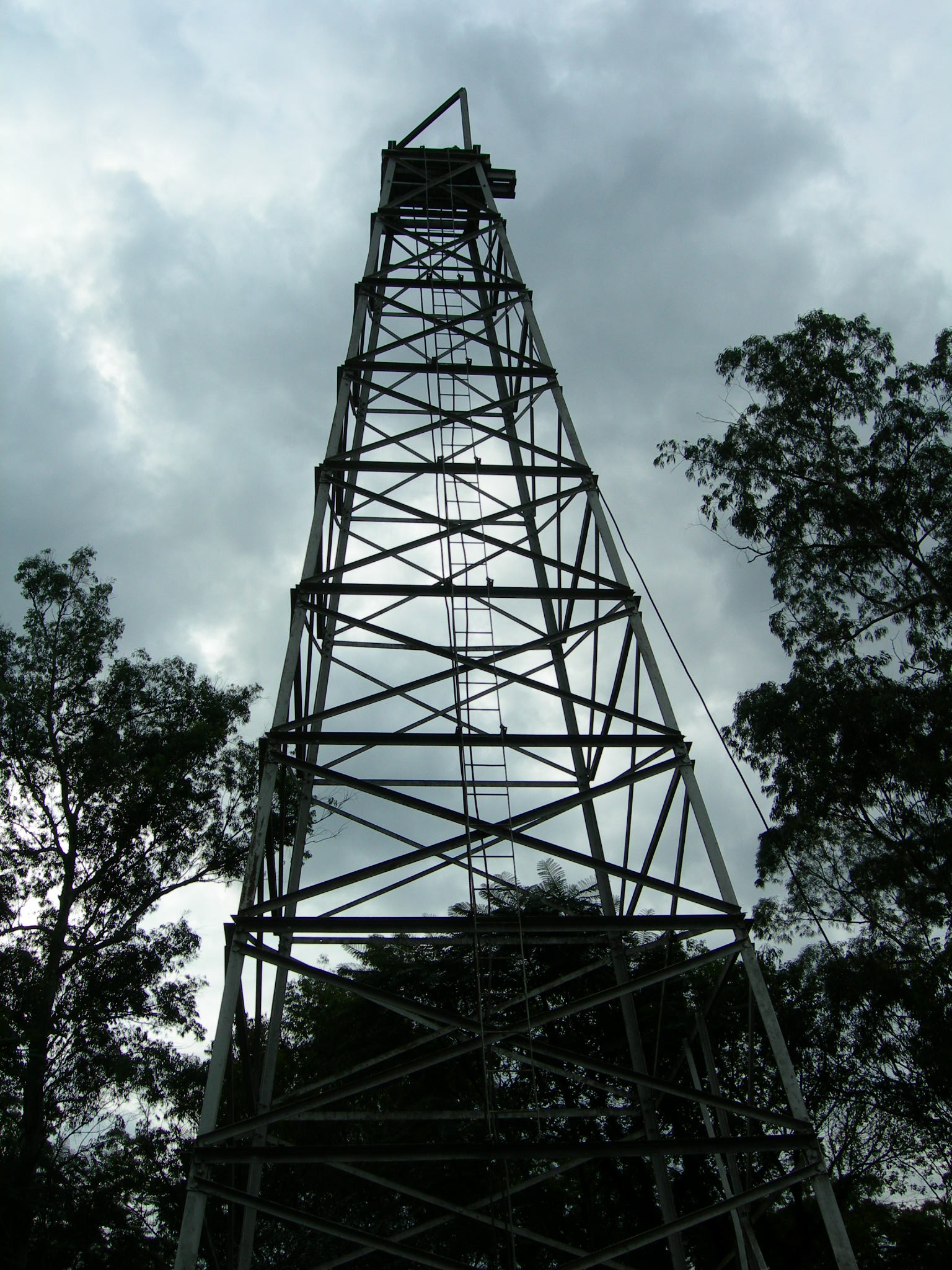
The Engineer Ângelo Balloni Oil Tower is a landmark of the city's history

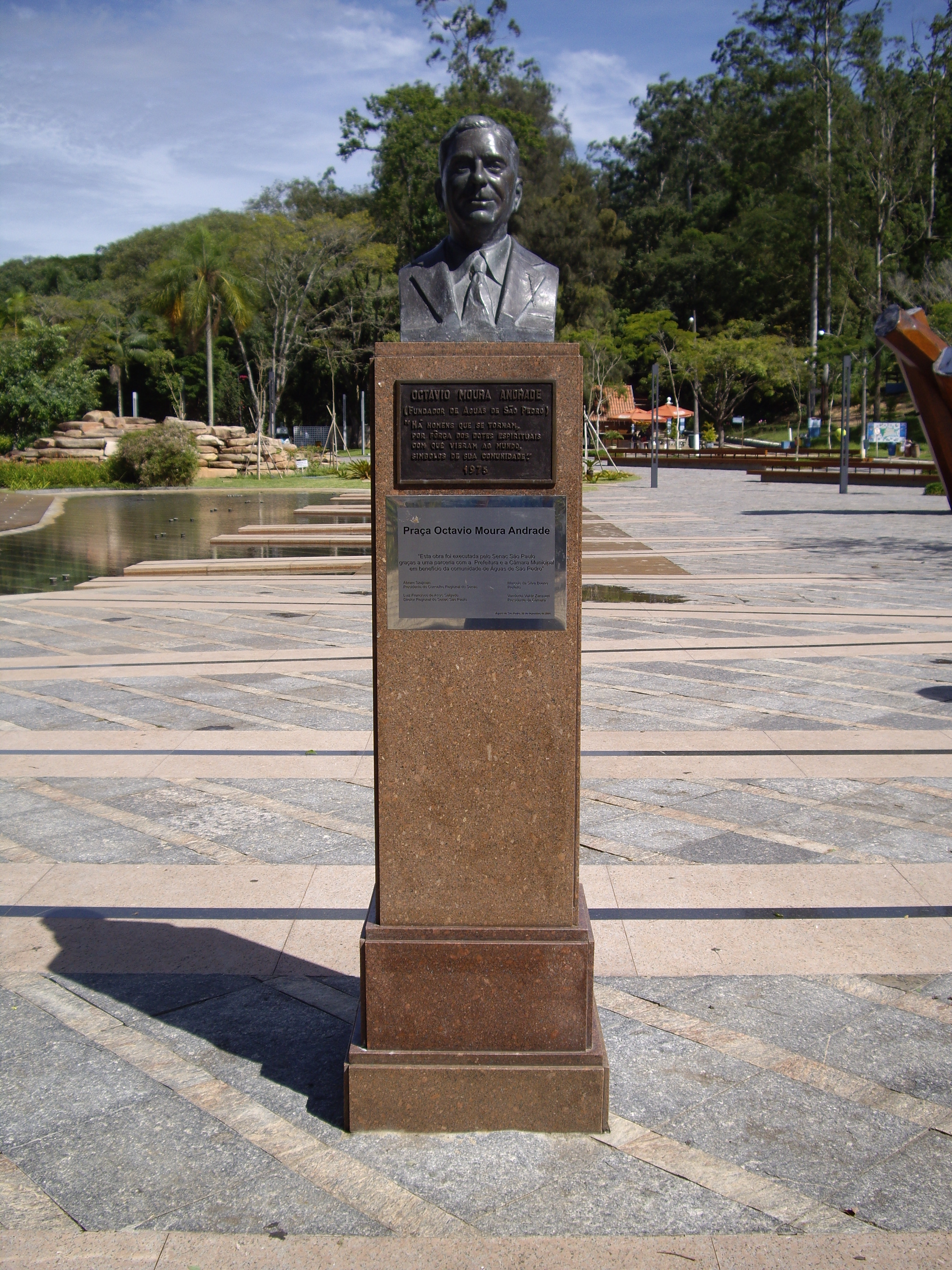
Bust of the city founder, Octavio Moura Andrade

Until 1800 the region of São Pedro and its enclave was virgin forest. The first known people to set foot in Águas de São Pedro territory were, as in most municipalities in the São Paulo countryside, bandeirantes seeking precious stones, especially gold, opening many roads and routes in the dense forest. One of these routes, called Caminho do Picadão (Way of the Forest Trail), started in Itu, passed through Piracicaba and advanced towards the hinterlands of Araraquara. For years, many farms were established in the region, until in 1883, São Pedro was detached from Piracicaba and became politically independent.

The economy at that time was based on coffee production, and many Italian families settled in these regions to work under partnership contracts to replace the slave labor. In this way, the Italian immigrant Angelo Franzin arrived in Brazil in 1887, going to work on a farm called "Recreio", owned by João Rezende da Cruz; just a year later Franzin would run other farms, like Santa Rita, Santa Eulália and Rosário. After many years of work, he purchased land with his brother Jácomo and decided to try coffee planting. The first properties they acquired were the farms Palmeiras and Limoeiro, followed by the lands of Floresta Escura, Gonçalves, Tuncum and Araquá, as well as houses, lots, and two machines to process coffee beans.

=== Search for oil and the discovery of springs ===
In the 1920s Júlio Prestes, the governor of São Paulo, began exploration of the oil prospecting area in São Pedro. His efforts failed to find petroleum, and the equipment was abandoned, but still gushing out mineral water. Subsequently, other attempts were made to find oil at greater depths, and again no oil was found. One oil rig structure still remains; it is called the Torre de Petróleo Engenheiro Ângelo Balloni (Engineer Ângelo Balloni Oil Tower).

Years later, in 1934, Franzin, owner of some of the land in the area, built a simple bath house (currently known as the "Youth Fountain") in one of the springs where he bathed, the waters of which had a characteristic smell of sulfur. A year later, a group of townspeople bought a lot measuring 100,000 square metres (1,076,400 sq ft) around the original wood bath house, where they built a health resort. It was composed of twelve masonry bathtubs. In that same year, Octavio Moura Andrade decided to build a spa there, giving it the name of Caldas de São Pedro, and, along with his brother, Antonio Joaquim de Moura Andrade, established the company Águas Sulfídricas e Termais de São Pedro S.A. (Saint Peter Thermal and Sulphydric Waters S.A.).

For four years, the Institute for Technological Research (IPT) of the University of São Paulo conducted a series of studies of those waters. Generally, water from great depths has a high concentration of substances that may be harmful to human beings, and its pH may not be suitable for bathing. In 1940 the results were published in Bulletin 26 of the IPT. The waters were deemed good for bathing, and their medicinal properties were studied by Professor João de Aguiar Pupo, Dean of the Faculty of Medicine of São Paulo.

=== Foundation and incorporation ===
Recognizing the importance of the thermal springs in the region, the São Paulo State Government on 19 June 1940 founded the Estância Hidromineral e Climática de Águas de São Pedro (Hydromineral and Climatic Spa of Águas de São Pedro). Despite this, the city celebrates its birthday on 25 July, the date in 1940 of the founding of the first major building in the city, the Grande Hotel (now Grande Hotel São Pedro). The municipality of Águas de São Pedro was incorporated by State Law No. 233, of 24 December 1948.

Map of the state of São Paulo (1948).

=== Construction of the spa town and urban planning ===
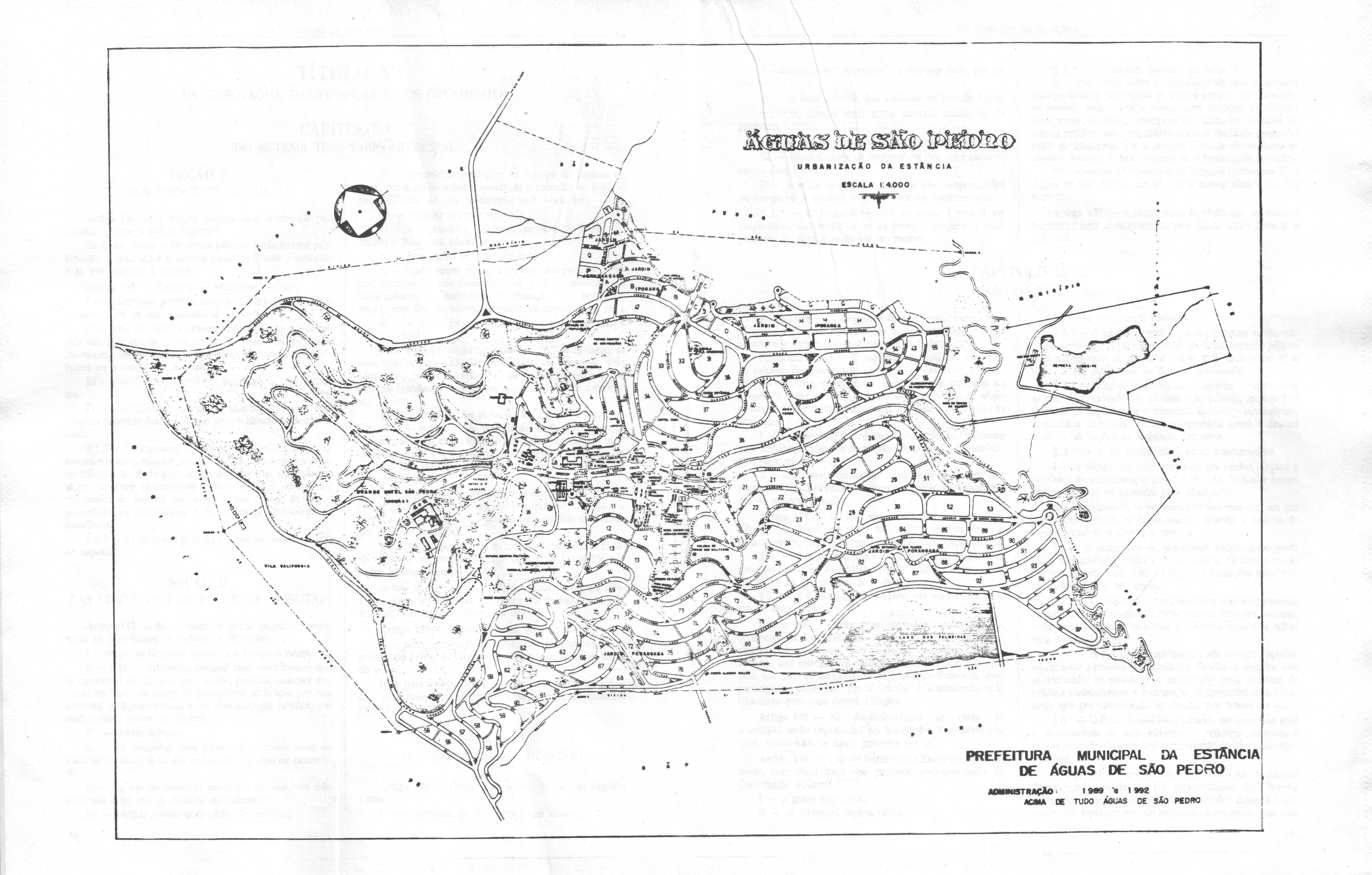
Map in 1990

To promote the development and exploitation of the medicinal waters in an economically viable way, Octavio Moura Andrade conceived and designed a city focused on hydrotherapy and residential purposes: a spa town. Águas de São Pedro was created as a hydromineral spa, fully planned and aiming to serve both those who needed treatment and tourists looking for fun and leisure. The urban planner Jorge de Macedo Vieira was chosen to integrate the use of space with the mineral waters, topography, soil, and climate, conducting a two-year-long detailed study of the area prior to designing the city. It was only in 1940 that the project was completed, being recorded in the Real Estate Registry Office of the District of São Pedro under number 1, in accordance with the requirements of the Brazilian Federal Decree-Law No. 58, of 10 December 1937.

As part of this project several buildings were constructed, including a large luxury hotel to welcome tourists, as well as a casino, one of the first in the country with activity regulated by the government. A sanitation system was constructed, with the technical firm Saturnino de Brito from Rio de Janeiro hired to study and control the sanitation system in the area around the Grande Hotel. Several roads were reconstructed, including an 8-kilometre (5 mi) road connecting São Pedro to the springs that can handle the traffic of heavy vehicles; construction of an airport (now São Pedro Airport) in a 40-alqueire area (239.2 acres, or 96.8 ha) with four runways, a departure lounge, electricity, telephone, running water, hangar and refueling station. Energy infrastructure was improved. Because São Pedro's power grid was in disrepair, a private power line was built connecting São Pedro to the construction works of the spa, and in the Grande Hotel was installed an emergency powerhouse with two diesel generators capable of supplying the hotel and the town.

=== Contemporary history ===
After the opening of the spa, tourism gained momentum. The city became one of the members of the Região Turística da Serra do Itaqueri (Touristic Region of the Itaqueri Ridge), composed of twelve municipalities. With the large influx of tourists, the need developed for improvements in the commercial sector, prompting renovation of the Rua do Comércio (Trade Street, old nickname for the street João Batista Azevedo).

In 2013 a group of companies led by Telefônica Vivo announced plans to make Águas de São Pedro the first digital city in the country. In the first stage of the project, the telephone wiring of the city was replaced, changing from copper to optical fiber. An antenna, providing 4G technology, and security cameras were installed; tablets were distributed to students of the municipal school; presence sensors in a smart car parking system and a smart street lighting system were installed, reducing energy consumption. At the end of 2015, though continuing to provide services to the community, Telefônica Vivo transferred managing responsibility to the city government. The second stage would begin in 2016, with the installation of interactive kiosks in public places, the training of teachers to work with new technologies, and the scheduling of medical appointments over the Internet, but ended up not being implemented. In addition, most of the residents went on to complain that most of the services promised no longer exist or do not work.

== Geography ==
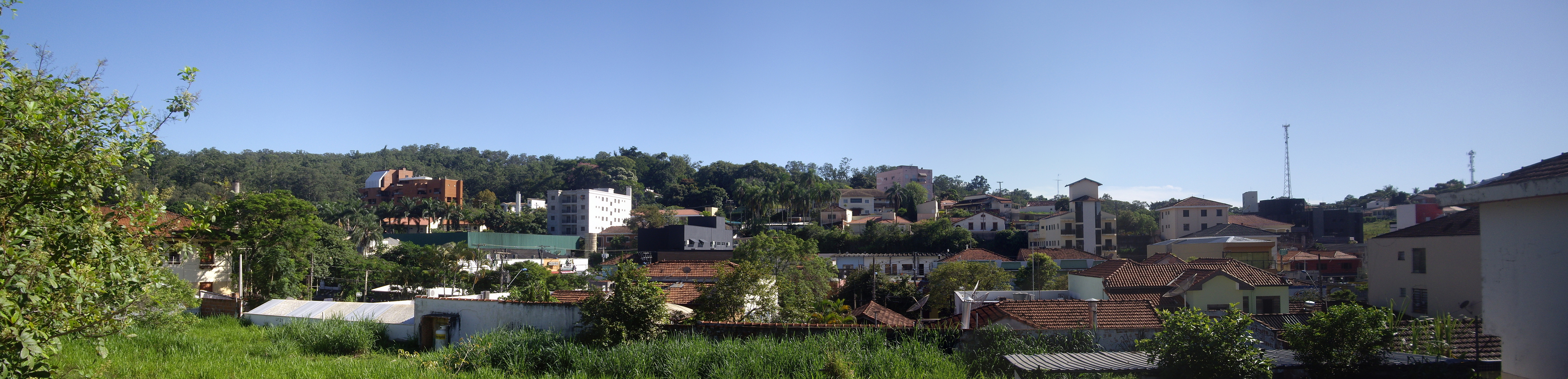
View of Águas de São Pedro city center

The municipality of Águas de São Pedro covers 3.612 square kilometres (1.4 sq mi), the second-smallest Brazilian city in area, only larger than Santa Cruz de Minas. It represents 0.0015% of the state territory and 0.0004% of the area of southeastern Brazil. The municipality does not have a rural area, only an urban perimeter.

Águas de São Pedro is divided into four neighborhoods: Jardim Jerubiaçaba (Garden Jerubiaçaba; Jerubiaçaba means "loyalty" in Tupí–Guaraní) in the northeast, Jardim Iporanga (Garden Iporanga; Iporanga means "beautiful river" in Tupí–Guaraní) in the east, Centro (Center), and Jardim Porangaba (Garden Porangaba; Porangaba means "nice view" in Tupí–Guaraní) in the south.

The city is located at latitude 22°35'50.422" south and longitude 47°53'02.309" west, and at a distance of 184 kilometres (114 mi) northwest of the São Paulo state capital. Its only adjacent municipality is São Pedro, from which is one of the four enclaves of Brazil, besides Arroio do Padre, Ladário and Portelândia.

=== Geomorphology and hydrology ===
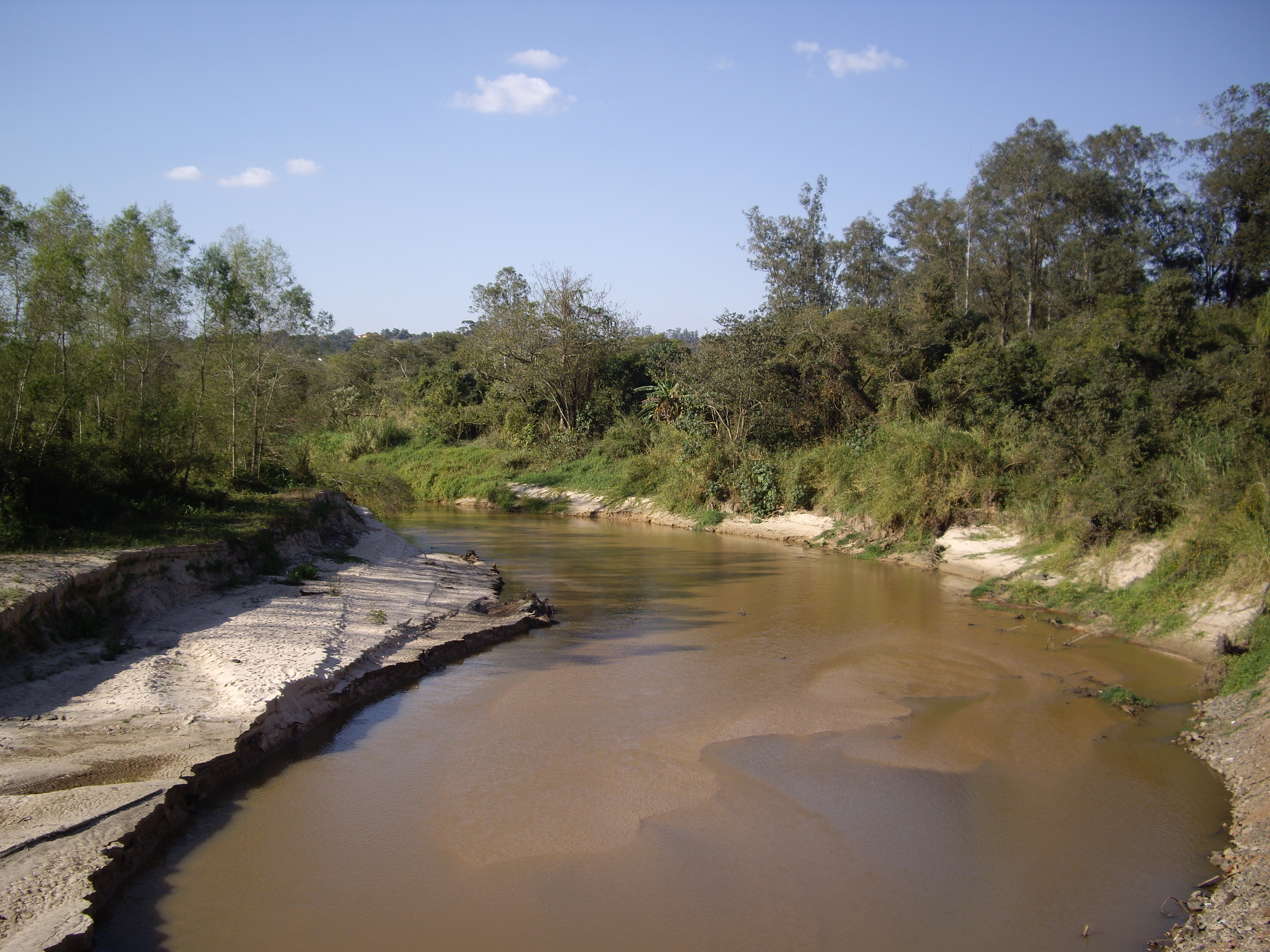
Araquá River

The geomorphology of the area of Águas de São Pedro is characterized by reliefs of low, soft hills – separated by valleys without major river plains – and it is slightly rugged, with sites that only rarely exceed 200 metres (656 ft) of unevenness. The municipality is at an altitude of 515 metres (1,690 ft) above sea level, and located in a geographic region called the São Paulo State Peripheral Depression, near the border with the Western Plateau, in an area of basaltic cuestas.

Águas de São Pedro is located in the so-called Piramboia Formation (Piramboia means "snake fish" in Tupí–Guaraní), one of the five stratigraphic subdivisions of the Paraná Basin, all formed at different periods, in which Triassic and Early Cretaceous ages sediments predominate. The sediments are composed of thin to medium arenites, white-orange to reddish in color, and with tangential cross-bedding in a mid-size to large base; these features are indicative of temporary rivers in the past in a semiarid environment.

The city is situated in the central part of the Medium Tietê Zone, which occupies about 15,000 square kilometres (5,792 sq mi), or two-fifths of the total area of the Peripheral Depression. It is bounded by Araquá River (Araquá means "hole of the world" in Tupí–Guaraní), which has a general north–south route, and also by the Limoeiro and Das Palmeiras lakes. The region where Águas de São Pedro is located is also part of the watershed of the Piracicaba River. The Piracicaba basin extends over an area of 12,568.72 square kilometres (4,853 sq mi), covering the southeastern state of São Paulo and the southern end of Minas Gerais.

=== Climate ===
Águas de São Pedro

Climate chart (precipitation, max. and min. temperature)
J	F	M	A	M	J	J	A	S	O	N	D
222 31 19	191 31 20	149 31 19	72 29 16	62 27 13	44 26 12	27 26 11	27 28 13	64 29 15	124 30 17	134 30 17	192 30 19
- █ Average max. and min. temperatures in °C
- █ Precipitation totals in mm
- Source: Center for Meteorological and Climatic Researches Applied to Agriculture
Imperial conversion
J	F	M	A	M	J	J	A	S	O	N	D
8.7 87 67	7.5 88 67	5.9 87 66	2.8 84 61	2.5 80 56	1.7 78 54	1.1 79 53	1.1 83 55	2.5 84 59	4.9 85 62	5.3 86 63	7.6 86 66
- █ Average max. and min. temperatures in °F
- █ Precipitation totals in inches

According to the Köppen climate classification, Águas de São Pedro has a tropical savanna climate (Aw), close to the humid subtropical climate (Cfa), with a decrease in rainfall during winter, an annual average temperature of 22.4 °C (72 °F), dry and mild winters (with occurrence of light frosts on a few days of the season), and rainy summers with high temperatures. The hottest month, February, has an average temperature of 25.2 °C (77 °F), with an average maximum of 30.9 °C (88 °F) and a minimum of 19.5 °C (67 °F). The coldest month, July, has an average temperature of 18.7 °C (66 °F), with 25.9 °C (79 °F) and 11.4 °C (53 °F) being the maximum and minimum averages, respectively. Fall and spring are transitional seasons.

The total annual rainfall is measured at 1,307.5 millimetres (51 in), and July is the driest month, with 26.7 mm (1 in) of precipitation. In January, the wettest month, the average is 221.5 mm (9 in). Since the early 2000s, however, hot and dry days during winter have been increasingly frequent not only in Águas de São Pedro, but also in much of the state of São Paulo, often surpassing 30 °C (86 °F), especially between the months of July and September. During the dry season and in the long veranicos in the middle of the rainy season, there have been increasing reports of smoke from burned-over land in sugarcane plantations and scrubland, mainly in the rural area around the city, leading the federal court to prohibit such activity in the region. Hailstorms are not common in the city, but one of the most recent occurred on 17 February 2010.

Climate data for Águas de São Pedro
Month	Jan	Feb	Mar	Apr	May	Jun	Jul	Aug	Sep	Oct	Nov	Dec	Year
Mean daily maximum °F (°C)	87.4 (30.8)	87.6 (30.9)	87.1 (30.6)	84.0 (28.9)	80.2 (26.8)	78.3 (25.7)	78.6 (25.9)	82.6 (28.1)	84 (29)	85.3 (29.6)	86.4 (30.2)	86.2 (30.1)	84.0 (28.9)
Daily mean °F (°C)	77 (25)	77.4 (25.2)	76.5 (24.7)	72.5 (22.5)	68.2 (20.1)	65.8 (18.8)	65.7 (18.7)	68.9 (20.5)	71.4 (21.9)	73 (23)	74.8 (23.8)	75.9 (24.4)	72.3 (22.4)
Mean daily minimum °F (°C)	66.7 (19.3)	67.1 (19.5)	65.8 (18.8)	61.0 (16.1)	56.1 (13.4)	54 (12)	52.5 (11.4)	55.0 (12.8)	58.6 (14.8)	61.7 (16.5)	63.3 (17.4)	65.7 (18.7)	60.6 (15.9)
Average precipitation inches (mm)	8.72 (221.5)	7.53 (191.2)	5.87 (149.2)	2.83 (71.8)	2.45 (62.3)	1.74 (44.1)	1.05 (26.7)	1.07 (27.1)	2.53 (64.3)	4.9 (124)	5.26 (133.5)	7.55 (191.8)	51.48 (1,307.5)
Source: Center for Meteorological and Climatic Researches Applied to Agriculture

=== Ecology and environment ===
The original vegetation in the area of Águas de São Pedro was the cerrado, a mixed formation classified into two strata: the upper stratum, composed of trees with variable height of from 3 to 6 metres (10 to 20 ft), with crowns often sparse and spaced apart, and the lower stratum, composed of continuous coverage of grasses and other plants less than a meter tall, and trees with trunks and twisted and gnarled branches, thick bark, large leaves, and thorns. This natural vegetation, however, is quite devastated. Today the vegetation is predominantly planted. The city has 69.58 hectares (172 acres), 17.40% of its total area, of reforested areas, mostly concentrated in Dr. Octavio Moura Andrade Park in the northwest, and 2.06 hectares (5 acres), or 0.69% of its total area, of floodplain vegetation, all concentrated on the banks of the Araquá River in the southeast portion of the municipality.

== Demographics ==
Population pyramid 2010
%	Males	Age	Females	%
0.967		85+		1.414
0.967		80–84		1.525
1.637		75–79		1.9
2.121		70–74		2.568
2.27		65–69		3.35
2.791		60–64		3.535
2.57		55–59		3.163
2.605		50–54		3.647
3.24		45–49		4.056
2.98		40–44		4.205
3.312		35–39		3.423
3.61		30–34		3.312
3.275		25–29		3.163
2.791		20–24		2.791
3.684		15–19		3.796
3.35		10–14		3.35
2.493		5–9		2.567
1.935		0–4		1.637

As of the 2010 Brazilian Census recorded by the Brazilian Institute of Geography and Statistics (IBGE), Águas de São Pedro has a population of 2,707. Of that total, 2,361 inhabitants are White (87.22%), 279 are Pardo (brown) (10.31%), 41 are Black (1.51%), and 26 are Asian (0.96%). It is the 594th most populous city in the state, and has a population density of 749.45 inhabitants per square kilometer. Of the total population, 1,262 inhabitants were men and 1,445 were women.

Historical population
Year	Pop.	±%
1970	830	—
1980	1,091	+31.4%
1991	1,697	+55.5%
1996	1,664	−1.9%
2000	1,883	+13.2%
2007	2,340	+24.3%
2010	2,707	+15.7%
Source: Brazilian Institute of Geography and Statistics

Half of the housing units of the city (50.6%) are owned by vacationers. Many people stay in the municipality only on weekends and holidays and have their homes just for recreation and as a real estate investment.

In the year 2000, 305 people (16.2% of the city's population) stated having some type of disability, almost two percent higher than the national average.

The Municipal Human Development Index (MHDI) of Águas de São Pedro, is at 0.854, considered very high by the United Nations Development Programme (UNDP), and is the second highest in the state of São Paulo, as well as the second highest in Brazil. Considering only education, the index is at 0.825, compared to 0.637 for Brazil as a whole; the longevity index is 0.890 (0.816 for Brazil); and the income index is 0.849 (0.739 for Brazil). The city ranks high in the majority of indicators, and above the national average in all indicators, according to the UNDP.

The Gini coefficient, which measures social inequality, is 0.40, on a scale in which 1.00 is the worst and 0.00 is the best. The incidence of poverty, measured by the IBGE, is measured at 5.91%, on a scale in which the lower limit is 0.17% and the upper limit is 11.65%; and the incidence of subjective poverty is measured at 4.24%.

=== Religion ===
As with the cultural variety in Águas de São Pedro, there are various religious manifestations present in the city. As of the 2010 Brazilian Census, the population had 1,836 Roman Catholics (67.81%), 435 Evangelics (16.07%), 228 people without religion (8.41%), 125 Spiritists (4.63%), 29 people with religion either undetermined or multiple belonging (1.08%), 13 Jews (0.47%), 9 Orthodox Catholics (0.33%), 7 Spiritualists (0.24%), 6 Jehovah's Witnesses (0.23%), 6 people with new Eastern religions (0.23%), 4 people of other Christian religion (0.15%), 3 Buddhists (0.12%), 3 people with esoteric traditions (0.11%), and 3 people from the Church of Jesus Christ of Latter-day Saints (0.12%).

Some places of worship in Águas de São Pedro

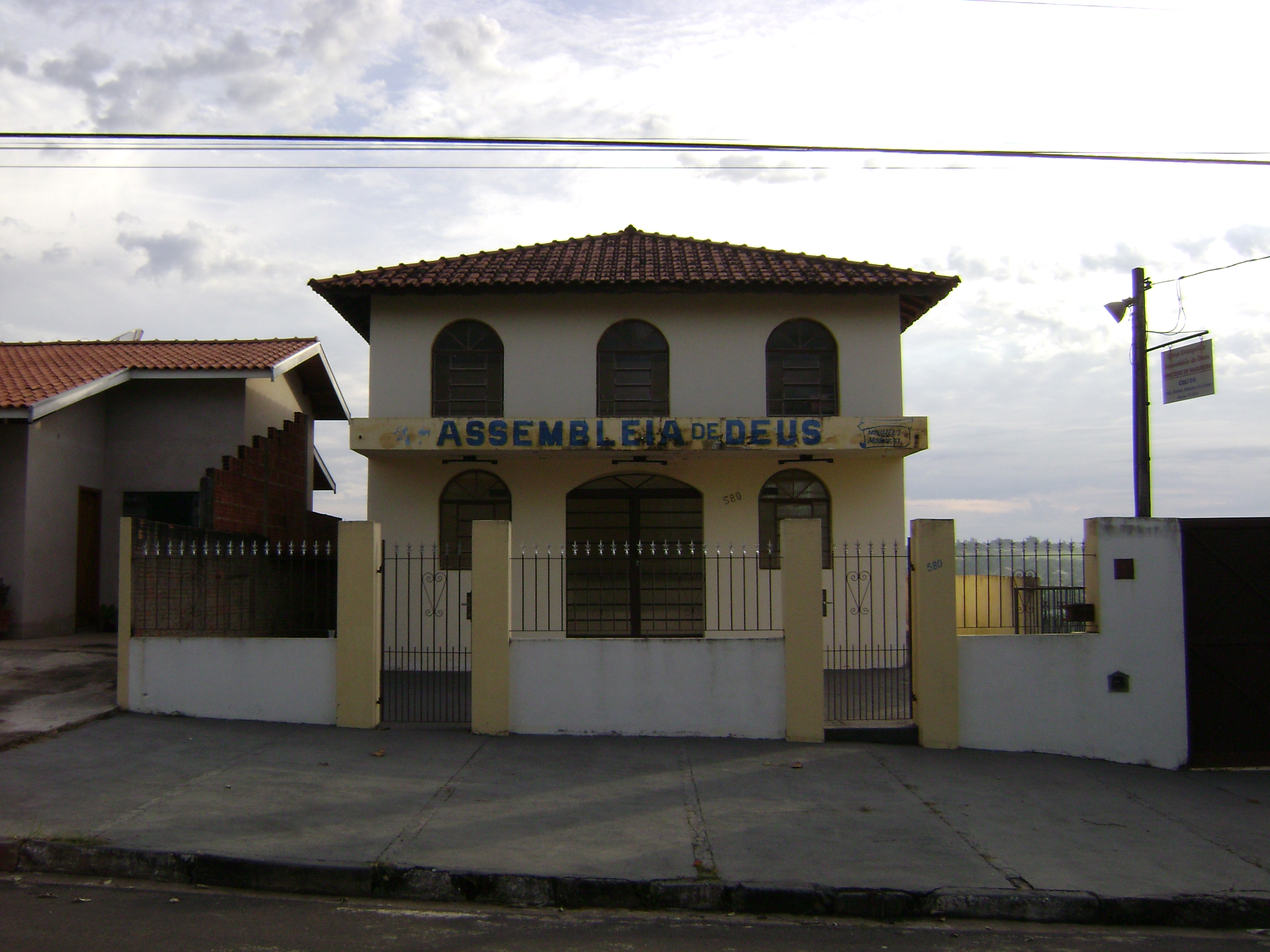
Assemblies of God Church

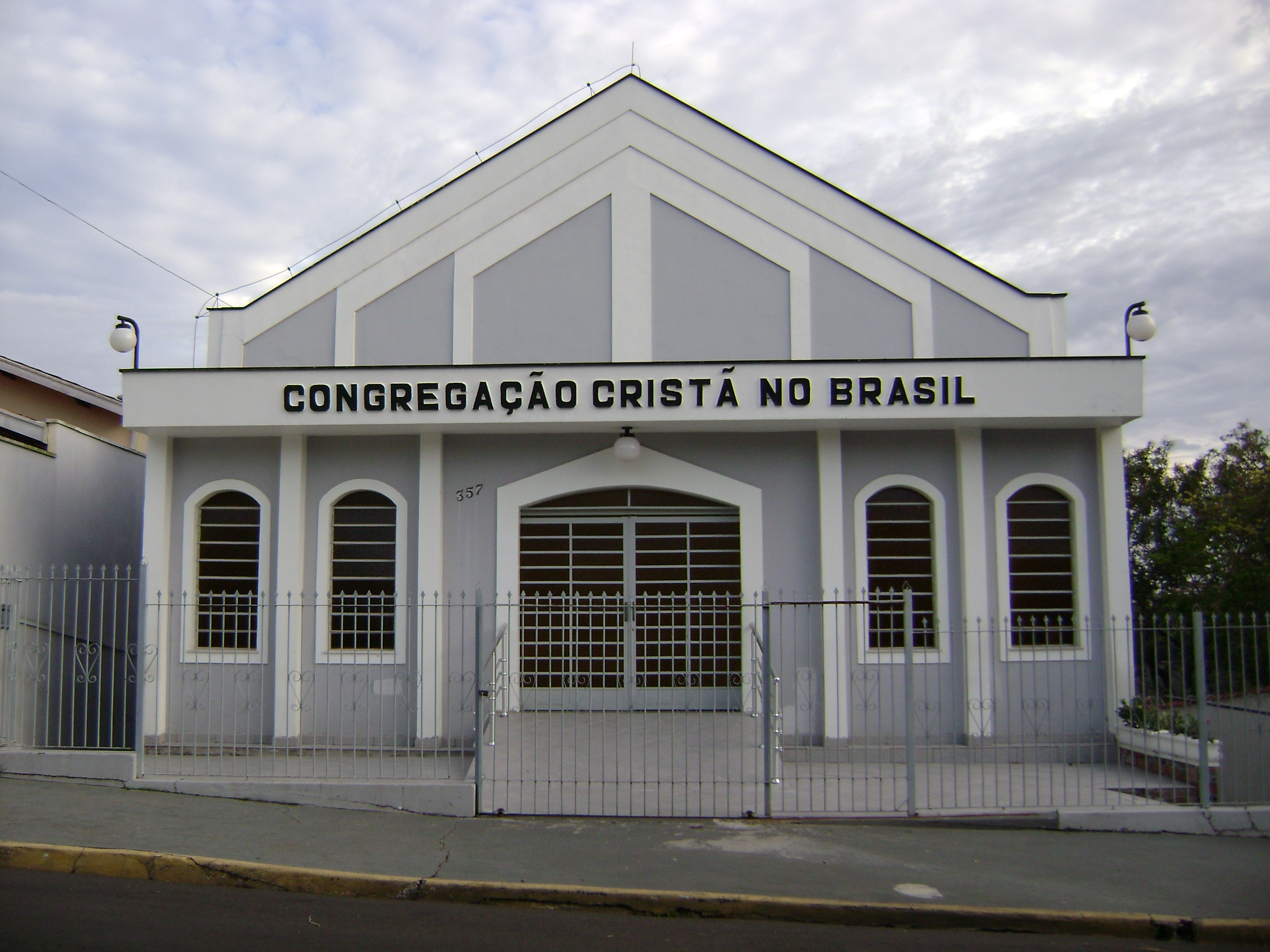
Christian Congregation of Brazil Church

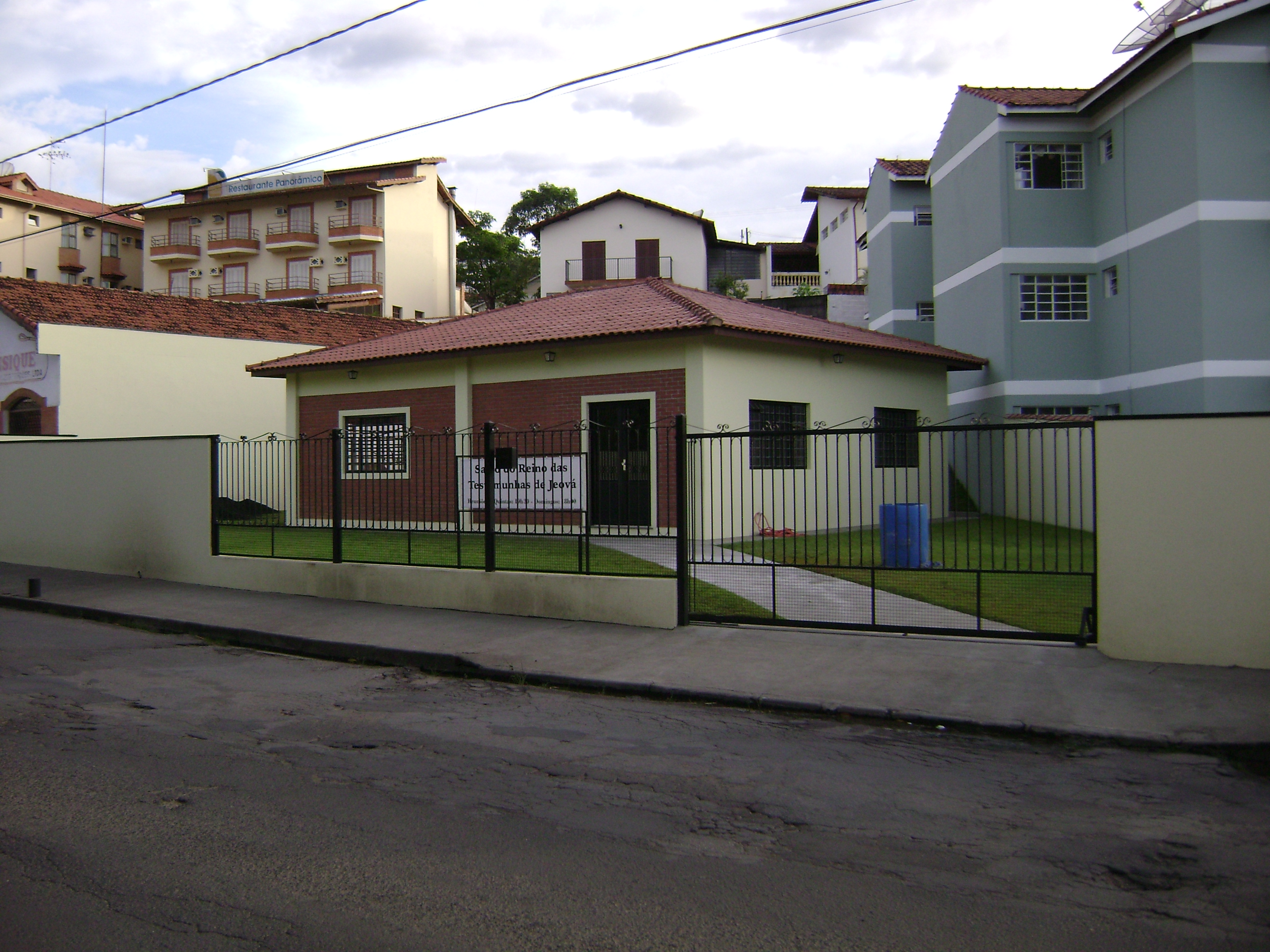
Kingdom Hall of Jehovah's Witnesses

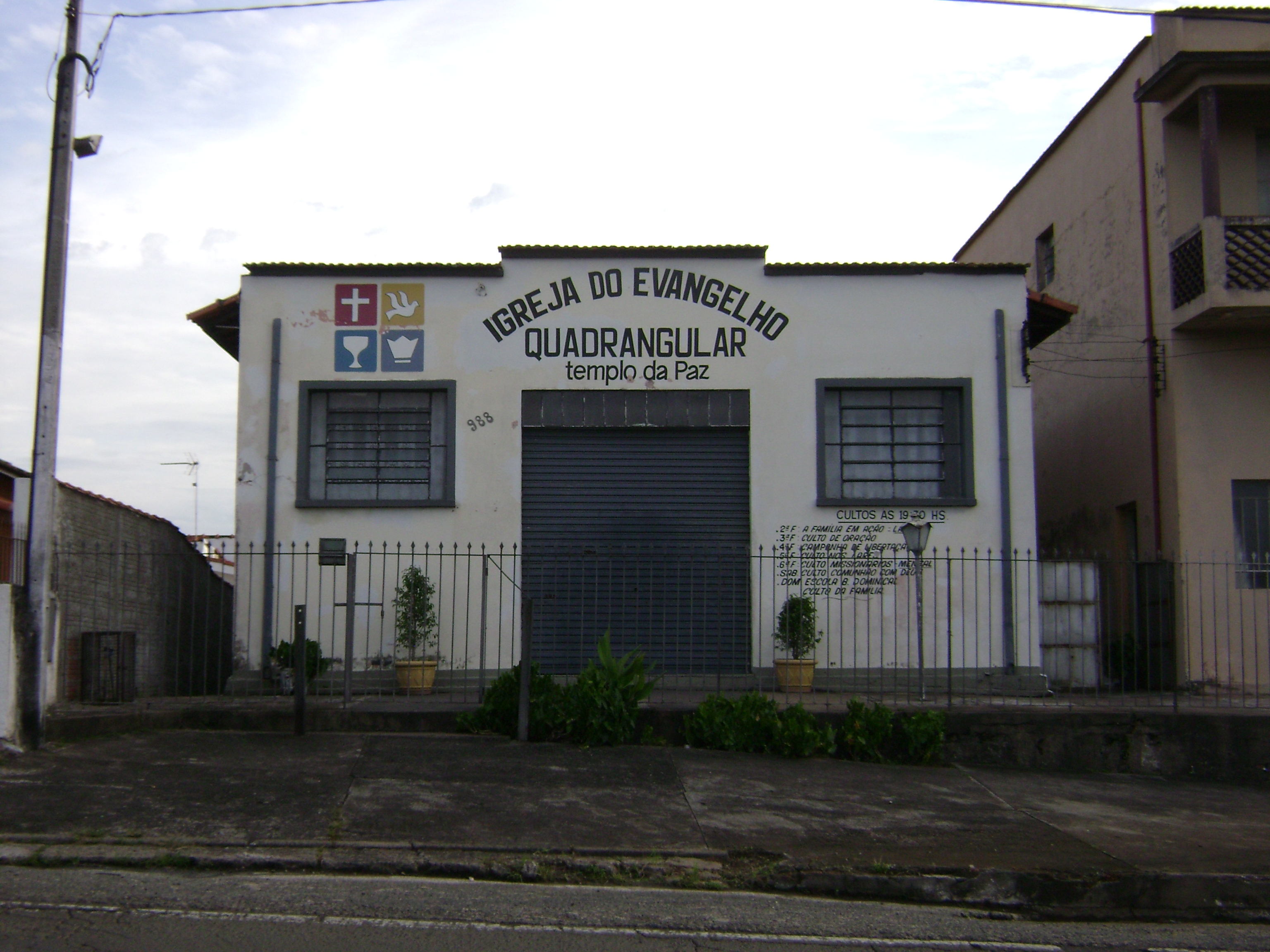
Church of the Foursquare Gospel

==== Roman Catholic Church ====
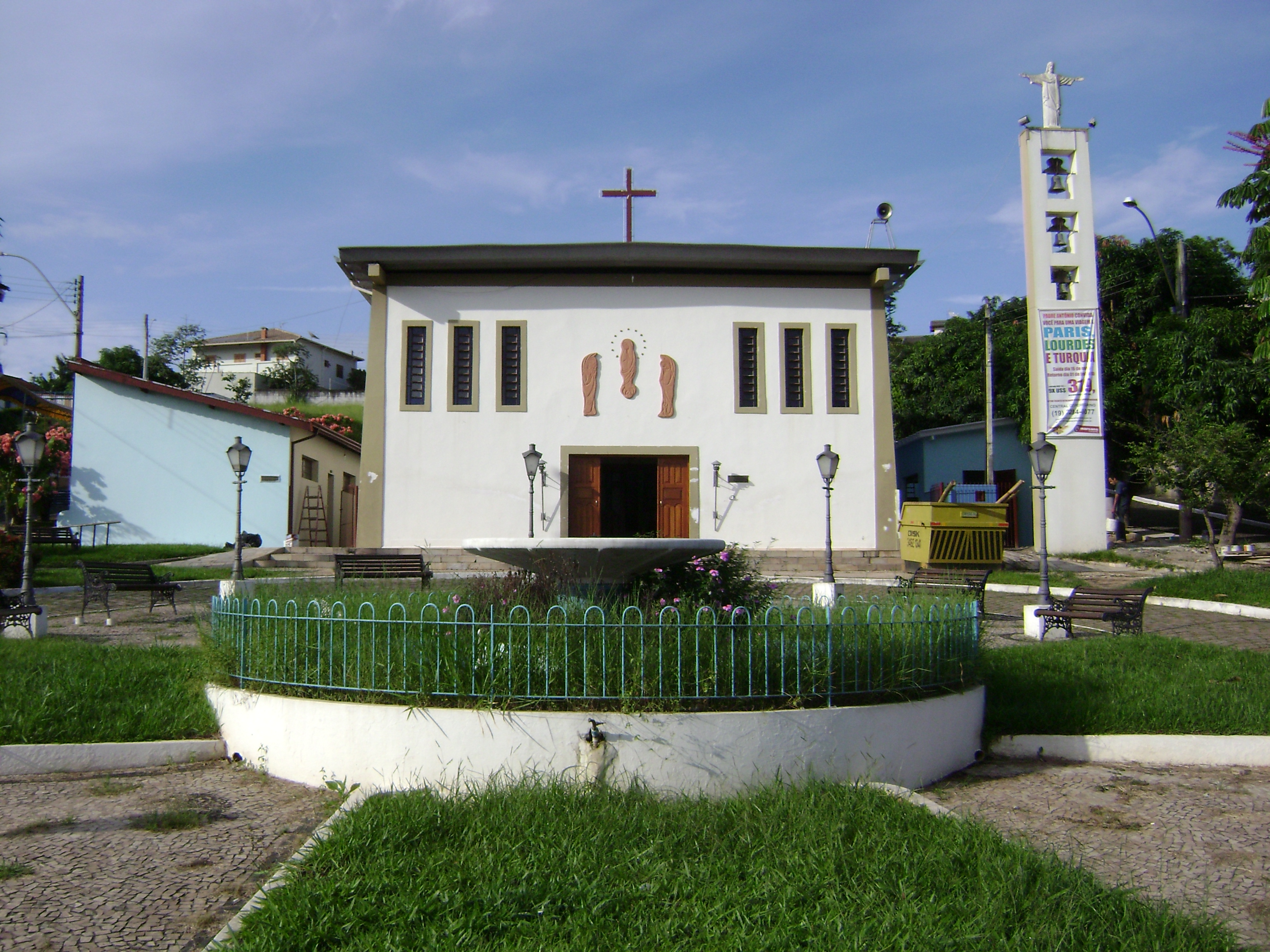
Immaculate Conception Mother Church

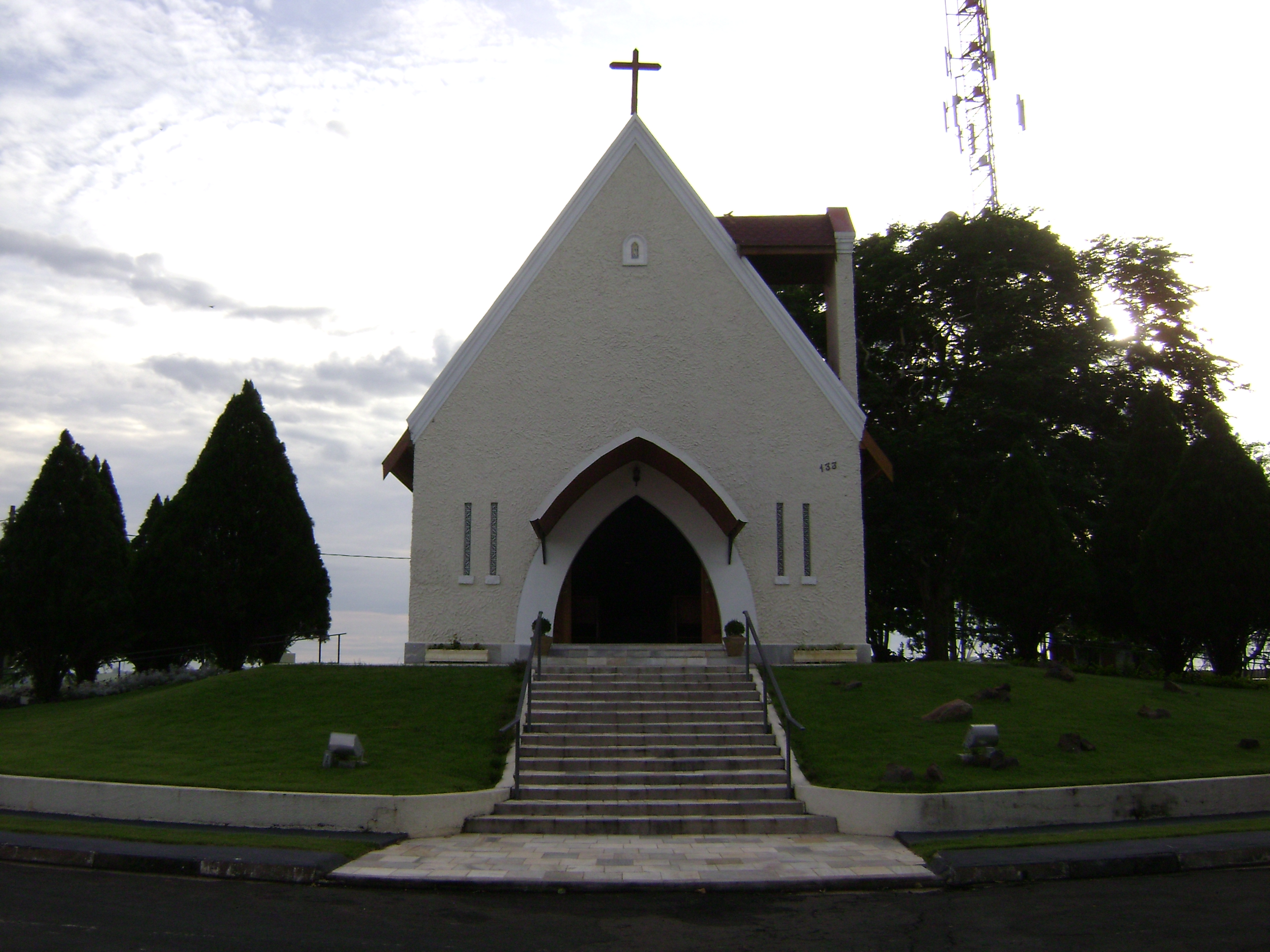
Our Lady of Aparecida Chapel

The history of the Catholic Church in Águas de São Pedro started when Mrs. Maria Julia das Dores Andrade, mother of the city founder, asked him to build the "House of God" along with the construction of the Grande Hotel. The highest place of the city was selected to erect it.

In 1946 a chapel was completed, its architecture based on a chapel seen by Dr. Octavio in the city of Rio de Janeiro. The chapel was dedicated to Our Lady of the Immaculate Conception. In 1954 Águas de São Pedro was removed from the City of São Pedro parish, and on 29 May of that same year, the present-day Immaculate Conception Parish was founded by Don Ernesto de Paula. The parish is subordinate to the Diocese of Piracicaba.

Years after the foundation of the parish, a new site near the central area of the city was selected for the construction of a new church, but those plans were not completed because Canon Marcos Van Inn, the creator of the project, died. Then the parochial hall of the city was nominated by the Bishop of Piracicaba, Don Aníger Maria Melillo, to be adapted into the city's Mother Church, as it remains today. The title of Immaculate Conception was transferred from the old chapel to the Mother Church, and the chapel is now dedicated to Our Lady of the Immaculate Conception of the Apparition.

==== Protestant Church ====
The most diverse evangelical beliefs are present in the city, mainly Pentecostal, including the Assemblies of God in Brazil (the largest evangelical church in the country), Christian Congregation in Brazil, among others. These denominations are growing more and more throughout Brazil.

== Economy ==
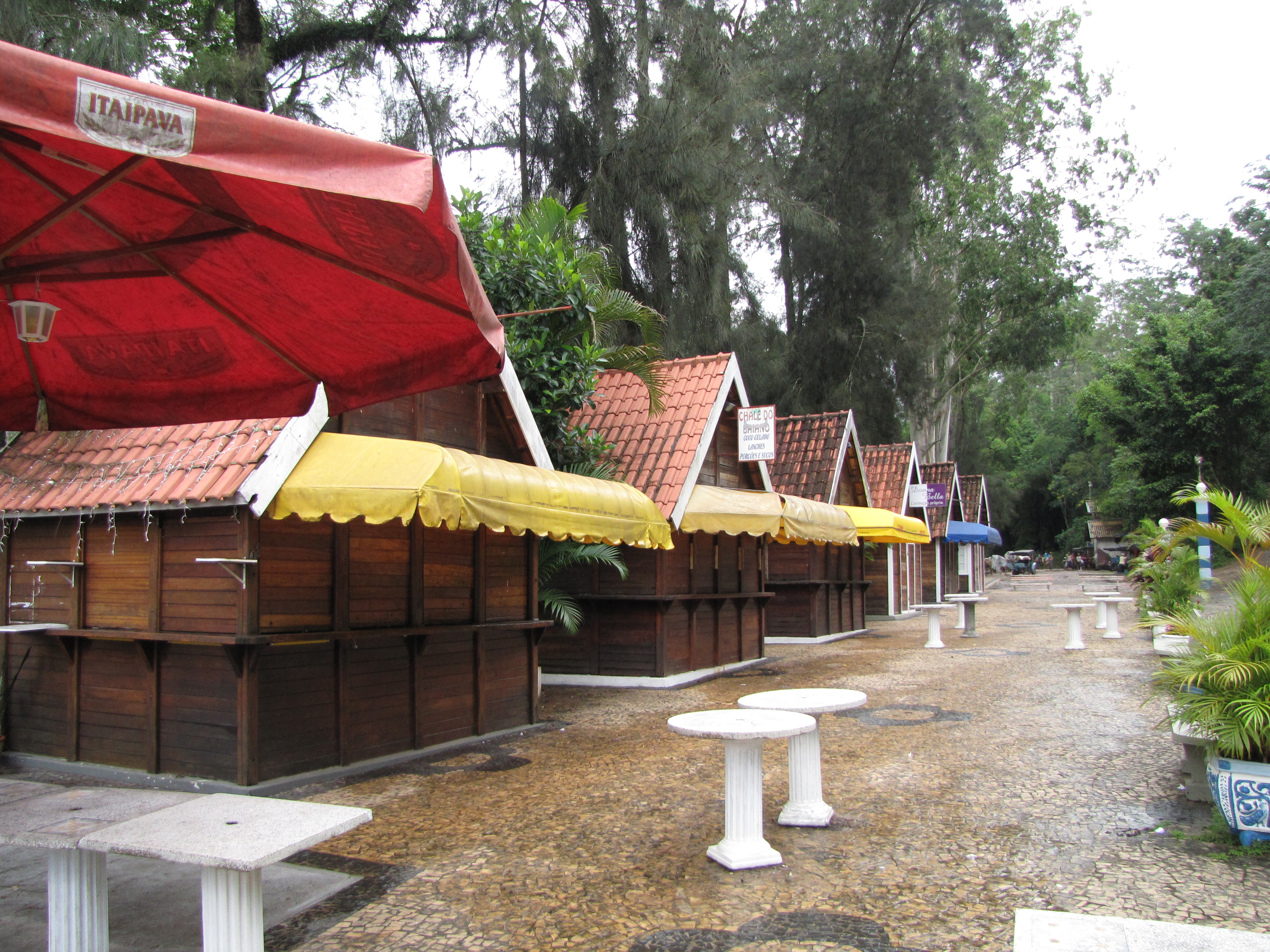
Small craft shops in the city

According to data for 2016 from the Brazilian Institute of Geography and Statistics (IBGE), the municipality had a gross domestic product (GDP) of R$132,616,560.00, of which R$7,533,360.00 were product taxes net of subsidies, and the GDP per capita was R$41,378.02. Also according to the IBGE, in 2016 the city had 225 local units (shops) and a total of 1,569 employed persons, with 1,271 of them salaried. Salaries along with other compensation totaled R$32,625,000.00 and the average monthly wage of the municipality was 2.2 minimum wages.

The city does not have a rural area, so the primary sector does not factor in the local GDP. Although the municipality does not depend on any major industry, the gross value added to the GDP from the secondary sector was R$10,504,940.00.

R$94,367,210.00 of the municipal GDP is from services, currently the major source of GDP of Águas de São Pedro. A major part of the tertiary sector is tourism, and the city's economy is geared exclusively toward this sector. The municipality of Águas de São Pedro is integrated with the Tourism Region of the Itaqueri Ridge and has as its main attraction its medicinal mineral waters. According to city officials, the new tourism routes go through regionalization. Tourists attracted by the natural attractions also help to stimulate the commercial sector of the city. The busiest retail centres are Carlos Mauro Avenue and Trade Street, which after renovations costing R$302,000.00 has become a pedestrian street.

According to the Brazilian Secretary of Foreign Trade (SECEX), in 2016 the exports of Águas de São Pedro totaled only US$838, all originated from Australia. Among the products exported are imitation jewelry, woven baskets and plastic lids. (Note: Queried data in the online database of DataViva.)

The holidays also tend to bring more income to the city. In the 2016 Carnival, for example, the Municipal Secretary of Tourism said that the influx of tourists would result in the addition of R$5 million into the local economy. Several economic programs were created to highlight the Tourism Region, attract more tourists, and improve the commercial and lodging sectors.

=== Media ===
Only one newspaper is published in the city, called Jornal Águas News, founded 21 May 2016 and have biweekly circulation. The city, however, is served by regional newspapers reporting events in the city, such as A Tribuna de São Pedro, and Jornal O Regional, from São Pedro, and Jornal de Piracicaba, A Tribuna Piracicabana, and Gazeta de Piracicaba, from Piracicaba.

Águas de São Pedro has only one radio station broadcasting from the city, Rádio FM Estância Ltda. (call sign ZYD 970), which began in 1987 and now is branded as 92 FM.

In telecommunications, the city was served by Telecomunicações de São Paulo. In July 1998, this company was acquired by Telefónica, which adopted the Vivo brand in 2012. The company is currently an operator of cell phones, fixed lines, internet (fiber optics/4G) and television (satellite and cable).

== Culture and recreation ==
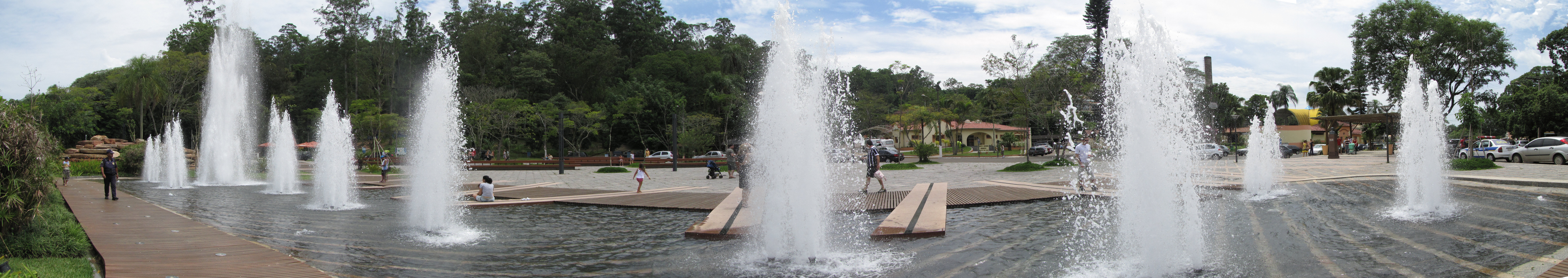
Fountain in Octavio Moura Andrade Square

=== Tourism ===
On weekends the city receives an influx of tourists that numbers up to twice the number of year-round residents – about 6,000 tourists. On the long holidays, the number of tourists can reach 30,000.

Águas de São Pedro is one of eleven municipalities considered hydromineral spas by the government of the state of São Paulo, by fulfilling certain prerequisites set by state Law. Federal Law no. 2,661 from 3 December 1955 states: "It is considered thermomineral, hydromineral, or simply mineral spa the location recognized by state law, and which has springs of thermal or mineral, natural waters exploited in compliance with the provisions of this law and the Federal Decree-Law no. 7,841, from 8 August 1945." This recognition ensures these municipalities a larger budget from the state to invest in regional tourism. Also, the city has the right to add before its name the title of hydromineral spa, the term by which the city is to be designated by both the municipal administration as well as the state references.

As green areas the city has the Mini Horto (Mini Garden), a place with a plant nursery and a pond, and two large parks:

- Dr. Octavio Moura Andrade Park (named in 1975), area with more than one million square meters (approximately 10,763,900 square feet), with 16 hiking trails with a length of 6,500 metres (21,300 ft). In the park can be found several species of the regional fauna and flora, as about 250 types of birds and approximately 40 coatis.
- Parque das Águas "José Benedito Zani" (Waters Park "José Benedito Zani", named in 2000), an area with 6,400 square metres (68,900 sq ft) with a jogging track, an outdoor gym, a skate ramp, and a bikeway.

Águas de São Pedro had the Museu das Telecomunicações "Gilberto Affonso Penna" (Museum of Telecommunications "Gilberto Affonso Penna"), better known as Museu do Rádio (Radio Museum), which was inaugurated in 2003 and had a collection of 117 items, ranging from gramophones to radio transmitters and typewriters. After a renovation in the place where it was located, the Centro Educacional e Cultural Angelo Franzin (Angelo Franzin Educational and Cultural Center, also known by the acronym CECAF), the museum was closed and has no forecast of reopening.

There are two local holidays in Águas de São Pedro: the city anniversary (25 July) and the day of the Immaculate Conception (8 December).

=== Mineral springs ===
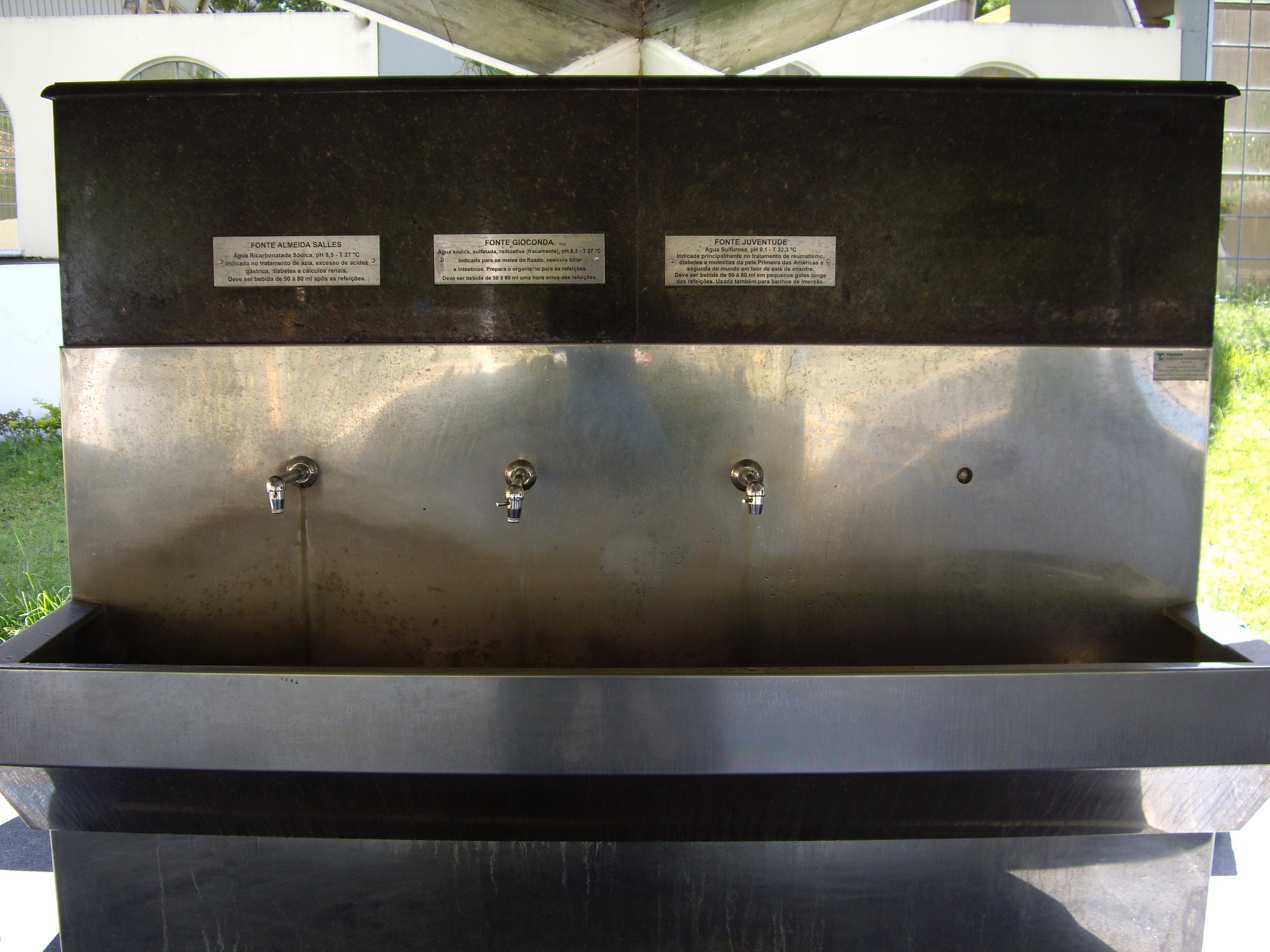
Drinking fountain with the three types of mineral water of the city

Águas de São Pedro is popular for its mineral waters, as its name indicates. There are three fountains in the municipality: Fonte Juventude (Youth Fountain), Fonte Gioconda (Gioconda Fountain), and Fonte Almeida Salles (Almeida Salles Fountain), all with a much higher mineralization than most other Brazilian mineral springs. Of these three, only the last two have a natural outcrop, as the Juventude fountain water comes from the artesian well at an old oil exploration site. The water in the Fontanário Municipal (Municipal Fountain) is potable, and for baths, there is the Spa Thermal Dr. Octavio Moura Andrade, the municipal bath house.

The water of the Fonte Juventude is collected at a depth of 348.59 metres (1,140 ft); it is the most highly sulfurous water in Brazil and the Americas and is the second in the world in sulfurous components (only behind the Pergoli fountain in Tabiano, Italy), with 34.3 milligrams of sulfur oxygenated compounds, 4 mg of hydrogen sulfide, and 53 mg of sodium hydrosulfide and sodium sulfide per liter of water. It is indicated for immersion baths and treatment of skin diseases.

Fonte Gioconda has a high sodium sulfate content (42 mg/100 mL), and is therefore indicated in the treatment of stomach diseases. The fountain was named in honor of the Giocondo family, who ceded the land around the spring to Octavio Moura Andrade.

The Fonte Almeida Salles is named in honor of the homonymous doctor of the Secretariat of Agriculture of the State of São Paulo who first visited it and tested the medicinal qualities of the water. It is a sodium bicarbonate water indicated for stomach and liver diseases.

=== Caminho do Sol ===
Caminho do Sol
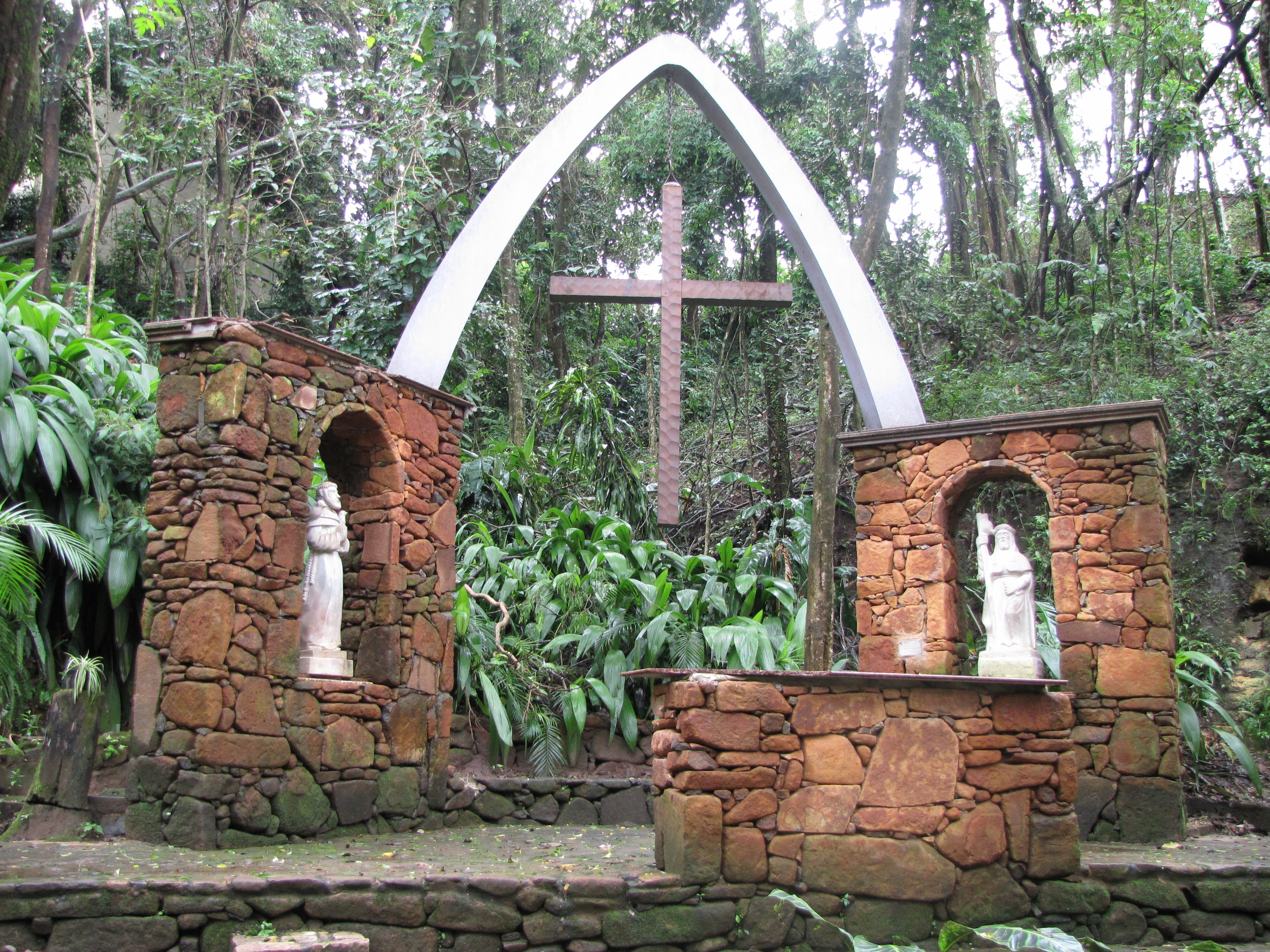
- Casa de Santiago
- Length: 241 kilometres (150 mi)
- Location: São Paulo, Brazil
- Use: Hiking and biking
- Website: Official website
Trail map

Idealized by José Palma in 2002, the Caminho do Sol (Way of the Sun) is a preparatory way to the Way of St. James, and it is recognized by the Xunta de Galicia. The route ends at the city of Águas de São Pedro, in the Casa de Santiago (House of St. James) located in the Mini Horto. Several pilgrims, with bicycles or hiking, come to the city every year along the way as a religious pilgrimage or tourism. The way is 241 kilometres (150 mi) long and passes through 12 municipalities in the following order: Santana de Parnaíba, Pirapora do Bom Jesus, Cabreúva, Itu, Salto, Elias Fausto, Capivari, Mombuca, Saltinho, Piracicaba, São Pedro, and Águas de São Pedro.

=== Arts and crafts ===
In the field of performing arts, between 2006 and 2010, an ongoing Theatre Exhibition of São Pedro and Águas de São Pedro was held. In 2010 the project won the "Competition to Support Festivals of Art in the State São Paulo" that was promoted by the Secretariat of State for Culture, part of the "Cultural Action Program" organized by the Associação Cultural Arte (Art Cultural Association), which ensured that the event had full and unrestricted support from the governments of the two cities.

Crafts are also one of the most spontaneous forms of cultural expression of Águas de São Pedro. In the city it is possible to find a variety of crafts, made with regional raw materials and created in accordance with the local culture and way of life. The "ART'S TRAMA – Artisans Association of São Pedro and Region", along with other institutions such as the municipal government or the Superintendence of Craft Work in Communities (SUTACO), bring together many craftsmen from the region and provide space for production, exhibition and sale of crafts such as quilts and crochet table runners, flowers produced with dry corn leaves, and woven pieces produced on looms. Usually, this material is sold at bazaars (like the ones promoted by the municipal Social Solidarity Fund), fairs, exhibitions or craft stores.

=== Sports ===
In 1941 the Grande Hotel hosted the first major chess competition in Brazil, the Torneio Internacional de Águas de São Pedro (Águas de São Pedro International Tournament).

More recently, Águas de São Pedro has sent delegations to participate in the Jogos Regionais do Idoso (Senior Regional Games, known by the acronym JORI) and the Jogos Abertos do Idoso (Senior Open Games, known by the acronym JAI). In 2018 56 athletes were sent to participate in the 22nd JORI, a competition with participation of athletes from 40 municipalities, and Águas de São Pedro attained 11th place.

== Government ==
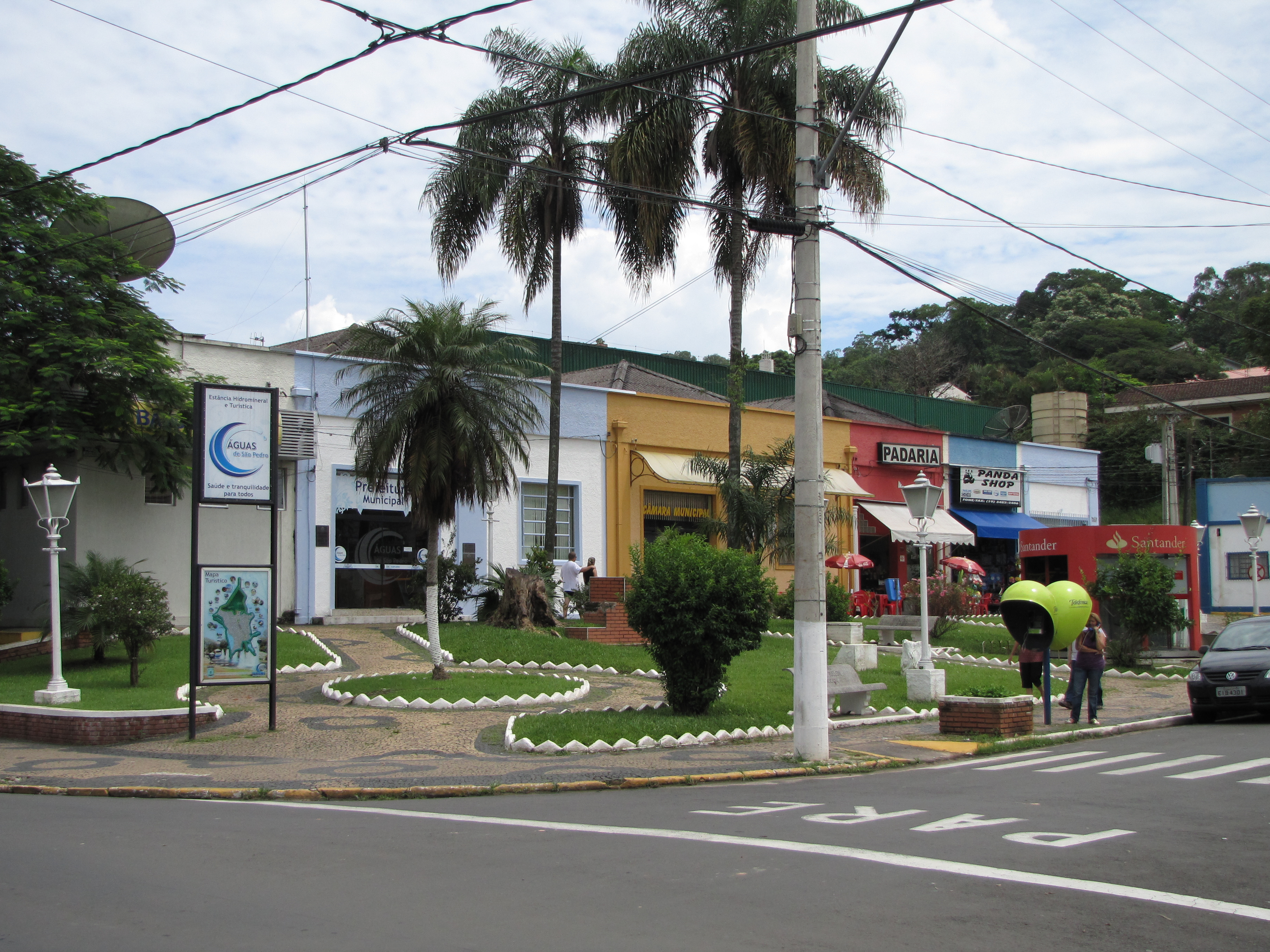
City Hall (white and blue building at left) and the Municipal Council (yellow building in the center)

The municipal administration is formed by the mayor and nine vereadores (councillors), who are elected for a term of four years. The installation of the Municipal Council and the inauguration of the first Sanitary Mayor, Carlos Mauro, appointed by the State Governor, took place on 2 April 1949. The mayor holds executive power and has nine secretariats under his command: Administration, Education, Finances, Tourism, Environment and Safety, Health, Social and Thermal Promotion, Public Works, and Urban Services. They assist the mayor in his government, planning, developing, orienting, coordinating and implementing policies in their respective areas. The legislative power is represented by the unicameral Municipal Council and its councillors, who are responsible for legislating and supervising the actions of the City Hall. The municipality is governed by the Organic Law of the Municipality of the Spa of Águas de São Pedro, from 5 April 1990.

There is no courthouse in Águas de São Pedro; the municipality is part of the district court of São Pedro. According to the Regional Electoral Court of São Paulo, the city had in 2014 2,881 voters, a number greater than the number of inhabitants. This happens because the city has many vacationers and students that end up transferring their electoral register to the municipality.

=== Politics ===
The current mayor is Paulo Sergio Barboza de Lima, a member of the Brazilian Social Democracy Party, and the vice mayor is Celso Henrique de Azevedo Marques, affiliated with the Party of the Republic. The Municipal Council is composed as follows: two seats are held by the Social Democratic Party (PSD); two seats by the Brazilian Social Democracy Party (PSDB); one seat by the Party of the Republic (PR); one seat by the Democrats (DEM); one seat by the Workers' Party (PT); one seat by the Popular Socialist Party (PPS); and one seat by the Brazilian Republican Party (PRB).

In the last elections in 2018, the most successful party in Águas de São Pedro was the Social Liberal Party, getting the most votes in all positions except for state representatives. Of the total votes, it won 64.03% (1st round) and 78.64% (2nd round) of the votes for the presidential candidate; 28.87% of the votes for the senator candidate; and 26.09% of the votes for candidates for federal deputy.

== Education ==
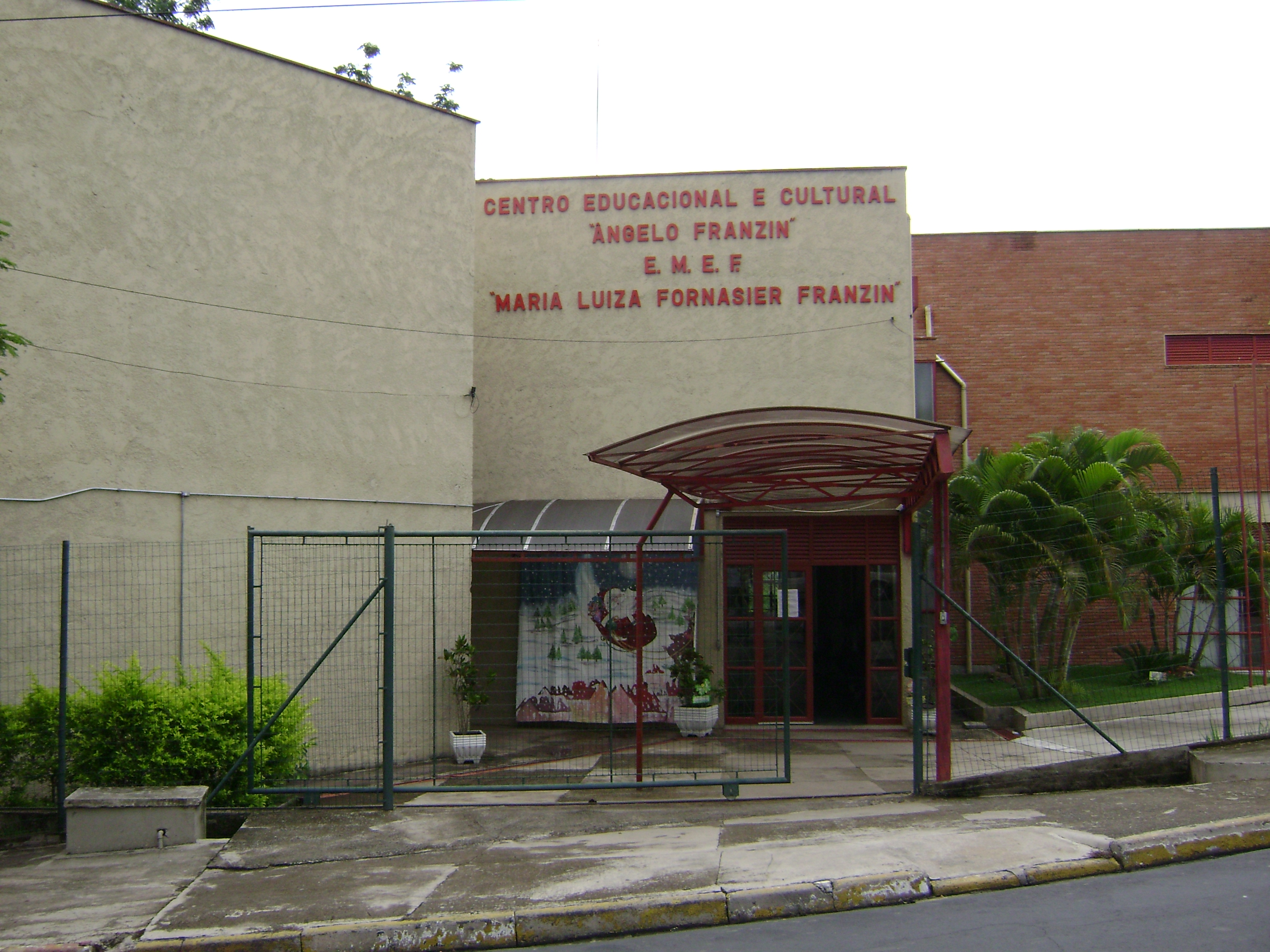
Angelo Franzin Educational and Cultural Center and EMEFASP III

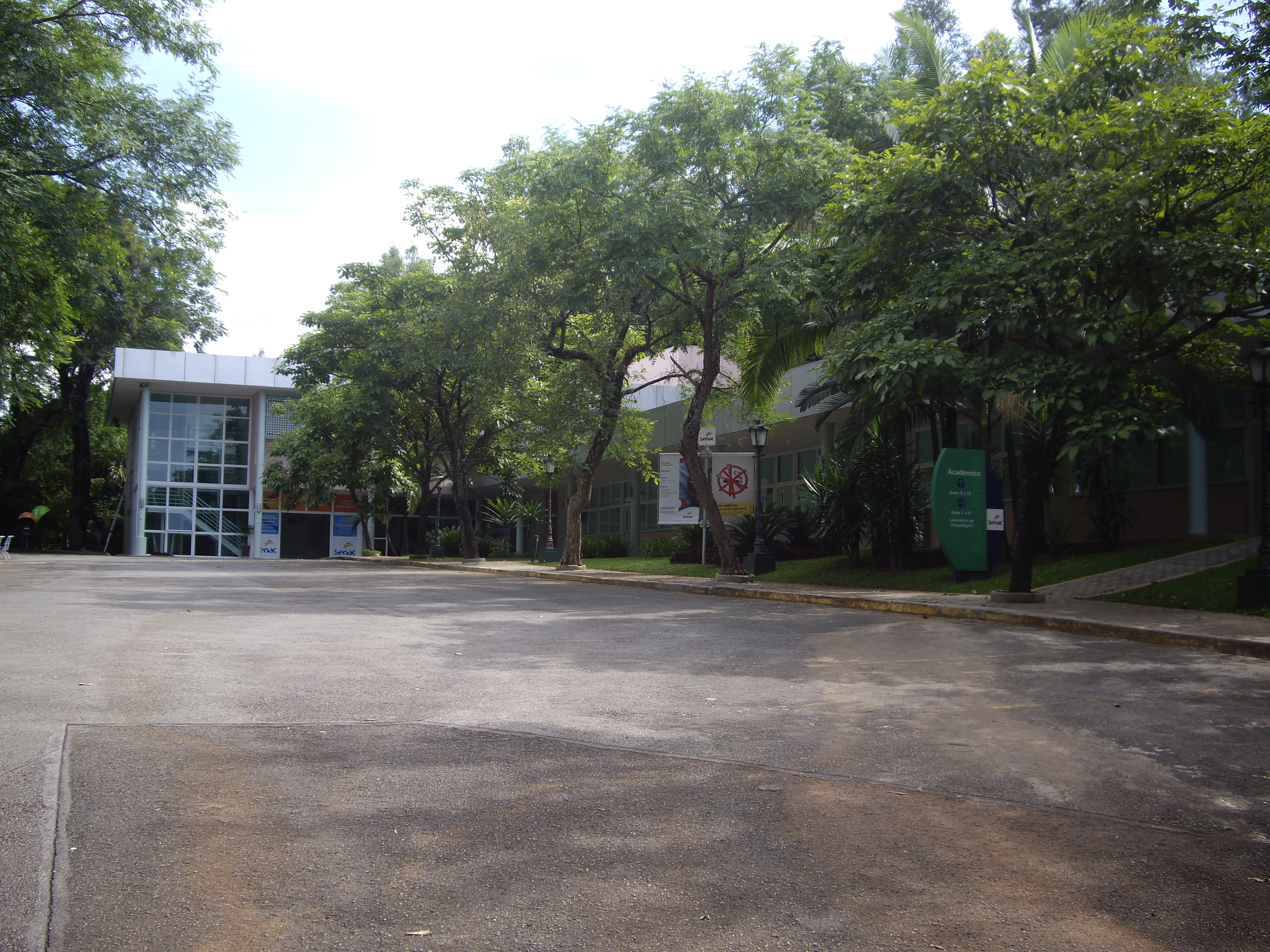
Senac University Center

Águas de São Pedro is served by three public schools:

- Escola Municipal de Educação Infantil "Vida" ("Vida" Municipal Pre-school), also known by the acronym EMEI Vida.
- Escola Municipal de Ensino Fundamental de Águas de São Pedro "Maria Luiza Fornasier Franzin" I, II e III (Águas de São Pedro Municipal Elementary School "Maria Luiza Fornasier Franzin" I, II and III), also known by the acronym EMEFASP "Maria Luiza Fornasier Franzin" I, II and III. The numbers I, II and III represents the three different buildings of the school; each building houses different school grades.
- Escola Estadual Angelo Franzin ("Angelo Franzin" State School), also known by the acronym E. E. "Angelo Franzin", is a high school.

The city also has an institution of higher education: inaugurated in 1995, the Centro Universitário Senac – Campus Águas de São Pedro (Senac University Center – Águas de São Pedro Campus) is a private university maintained by the Brazilian National Commercial Training Service, that is known by the acronym Senac (Portuguese: Serviço Nacional de Aprendizagem Comercial). It was formerly known as Senac Faculties, but in 2004 it was accredited by the Brazilian Ministry of Education and Culture as University Center. In Brazil there is a difference between Faculty, University Center and University, which respectively differ in size, in the academic titles of its teaching staff and in the time of dedicated service.

In 2017 the municipality had a total student enrollment of 686 (105 in the pre-school, 431 in the elementary school, and 150 in the high school) and 51 teachers (5 in the pre-school, 34 in the elementary school, and 12 in the high school) in its schools. According to the Indicador Social de Desenvolvimento dos Municípios (Social Index of Development of Municipalities, known by the acronym ISDM) of the Getúlio Vargas Foundation in 2010, the percentage of illiterate people over 18 years of age was 1.71%, and among people aged 15–17 was 0%. According to the Brazilian Institute of Geography and Statistics (IBGE) data from the 2010 census, there were in Águas de São Pedro a total of 2,441 people over 10 years of age, of which 741 had no education and had not completed primary school, 360 had completed primary school and had incomplete secondary education, 729 had completed secondary education and had incomplete higher education, and 610 had completed higher education.

== Infrastructure ==
The city of Águas de São Pedro had 990 residences in 2010. Of this total 654 were owned properties, with 610 owned and already paid for, 44 being paid for, and 266 rented; 69 properties were lent, with 38 lent by an employer and 31 lent by other means.

=== Transportation ===
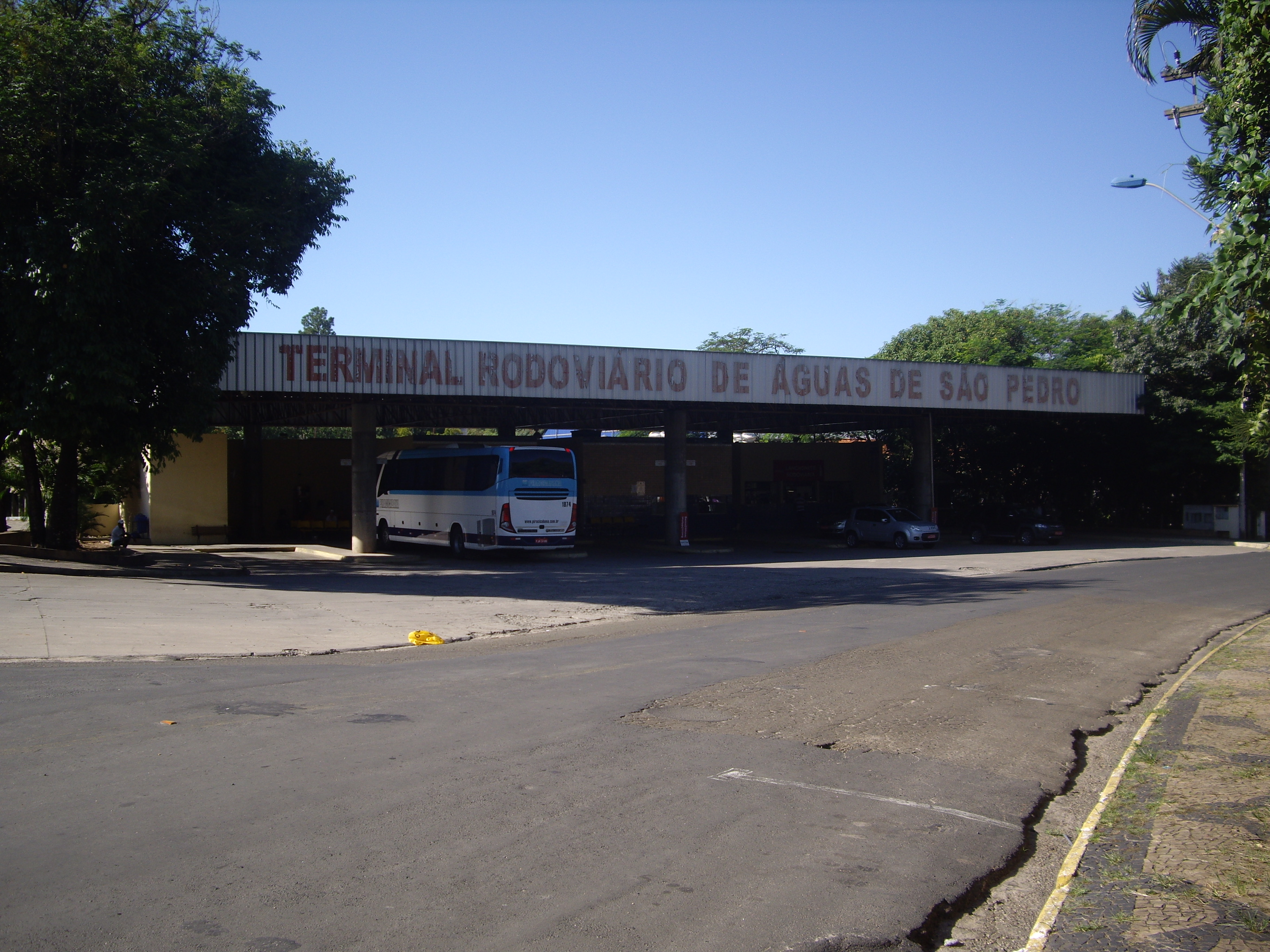
Bus station of Águas de São Pedro

In 1892 a railway station was opened in the town of São Pedro; it belonged to the Companhia União Sorocabana e Ytuana, which later served as a route for those who wanted to reach Águas de São Pedro. Between 1907 and 1919 it was part of the Sorocabana Railway, and until 1966 it belonged to the Sorocabana Railroad, part of the already defunct Piracicaba Line. The station was deactivated at the end of the 1960s, when the first paved roads were built in São Pedro and its enclave. Today, only one highway passes through the city, the SP-304, Rodovia Geraldo de Barros. It connects Águas de São Pedro with the cities of São Pedro (8 kilometres (5 mi) northwest) and Piracicaba (29 kilometres (18 mi) southeast). Due to the high volume of truck traffic, part of the road that passes through the urban area developed several potholes. In response to that problem, politicians of the municipality and the neighbouring cities pressured the state governor for the duplication of the highway. After the Department of Highways (DER) approved the project, the construction began on 22 August 2014, was finished and the state governor officially declared the work completed by inaugurating the last kilometer built on 16 March 2018.

The city is located near the São Pedro Airport, which opened in 1938 and has undergone renovation in 2010. It is situated near SP-304, and has a dirt runway 1,100 metres (3,600 ft) long. The old city bus station was upgraded to properly receive the passengers of intercity buses, re-opening on 31 December 2008.

The municipal fleet in 2016 had a total of 2,491 vehicles, registering 1.29 inhabitants per vehicle, which causes traffic flow problems, especially in the city center on weekends.

=== Utilities ===
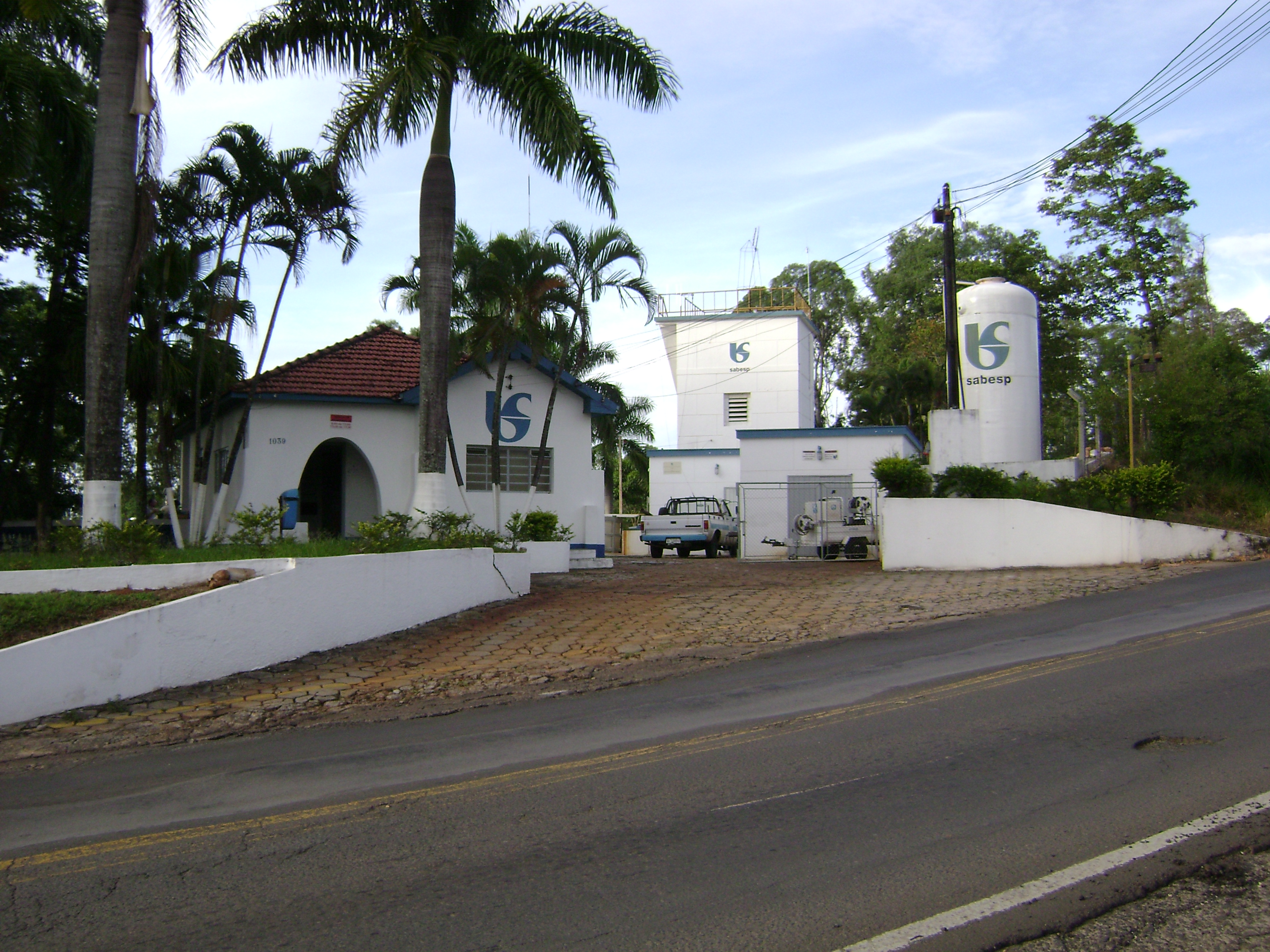
Sabesp Águas de São Pedro water treatment plant

Electricity is provided to the city by the Companhia Paulista de Força e Luz (São Paulo State Power and Light Company). The entire public power grid has been donated to the company and has been run by it since 1973.

Water is provided by the Basic Sanitation Company of the State of São Paulo (Sabesp) since 1977, providing tap water to 100% of the city, but serves only 93.47%–95% of the city with sewage collection. Águas de São Pedro had not a sewage treatment plant, so all the collected sewage (70,000 L/day, 101.7 kilograms (224 lb) BOD/month) was not treated and flowed into the Araquá River, which is also one of the city's main water resources. The absence of a sewage treatment plant in the city has generated complaints from the population, questioning the responsibility of Sabesp in this problem. Other problematic cases such as water catchment, siltation, and environmental degradation have caused the mayor to consider not renewing the city's contract with the company. After several negotiations, the contract was renewed in May 2013. The first equipment for the construction of a sewage treatment plant arrived in November 2015, and the building was finished in 2016.

Telephone and cable Internet services are offered by Vivo. At its foundation, it was attended by the company Companhia Telefônica Brasileira (Brazilian Telephone Company, known by the acronym CTB), and at the end of 1963, Octavio Moura Andrade and partners founded the Telefônica Águas de São Pedro Ltda. (Águas de São Pedro Telephone Ltd.), who started to lead the telephone industry in the municipality. In 1973, the company was acquired by Telecomunicações de São Paulo S/A (São Paulo Telecommunications S.A., known by the acronym TELESP), and became part of the South-Central Regional A5 (OA5) District of the company. After the privatization of the Brazilian state-owned telephone companies in 1998, Telefónica (now trading as Vivo) started to control the telephone services of the municipality.

=== Health care ===
In 2009 the municipality had four health care facilities, two private and two public (the Municipal First Aid Clinic and the Basic Health Unit Eurides de Lima "Dinho Barbosa"). The city also has outpatient care with medical care in basic specialties, dental care with a dentist, and access to services in the Sistema Único de Saúde (Unified Health System, known by the acronym SUS). In December 2009 Águas de São Pedro had sixteen doctors, four general practitioners, four nursing assistants, three nurses, two nursing technicians, two physiotherapists and eight people distributed in other categories, for a total of 39 health care professionals.

=== Public safety ===
The absence of murders for more than a decade is celebrated in Águas de São Pedro. Since its foundation, the municipality had recorded only one murder case, a double homicide on 17 August 1994, when Fátima Rinaldi Dante, 40 years old, and her granddaughter, Maria Virgínia Dante, 1 year old, were shot dead. The case was never solved.

The city has a third-class police station, and is patrolled by the 2nd group of the 3rd company of the 10th battalion of the Military Police of São Paulo State and the Municipal Civil Guard. Also, the city does not have a Fire Department station, being then attended by the one located in the neighboring city of São Pedro.

The following charts illustrate crimes reported to police in Águas de São Pedro between 1999–2019 (Note: Queried data in the online database of the Public Security Secretariat of the State of São Paulo (Portuguese: Secretaria de Segurança Pública do Estado de São Paulo).) with statistics taken from crimes reported to Police by year and by month.

View source data.
View chart definition.

== Sister cities ==
- Cubatão, Brazil (1991)
- Molinaseca, Spain (2012)

== See also ==
- List of municipalities in São Paulo
- Interior of São Paulo

== Notes and references ==
=== Bibliography ===
- Camargo, Ruy Bueno de Arruda (1990). Estância Hidromineral de Águas de São Pedro – Guia Turístico e Medicinal [Hydromineral Spa of Águas de São Pedro – Touristic and Medicinal Guide] (in Portuguese) (1st ed.). São Paulo, Brazil: Editora Senac São Paulo.
