= Hino a Águas de São Pedro =

Municipal anthem of Águas de São Pedro, Brazil

English: Anthem to Águas de São Pedro
- Municipal anthem of Águas de São Pedro
- Lyrics: Maria Magdalena Mauro Miranda
- Music: Maria Magdalena Mauro Miranda
- Adopted: 1980

Hino a Águas de São Pedro (Portuguese pronunciation: [ˈino a ˈaɡwaz dʒi sɐ̃w ˈpedɾu], "Hymn to Águas de São Pedro" or "Anthem to Águas de São Pedro") is the official anthem of the municipality of Águas de São Pedro, Brazil. Composed by Maria Magdalena Mauro Miranda, it was officialized by the municipal Law no. 553 of 24 November 1980.

== Lyrics ==
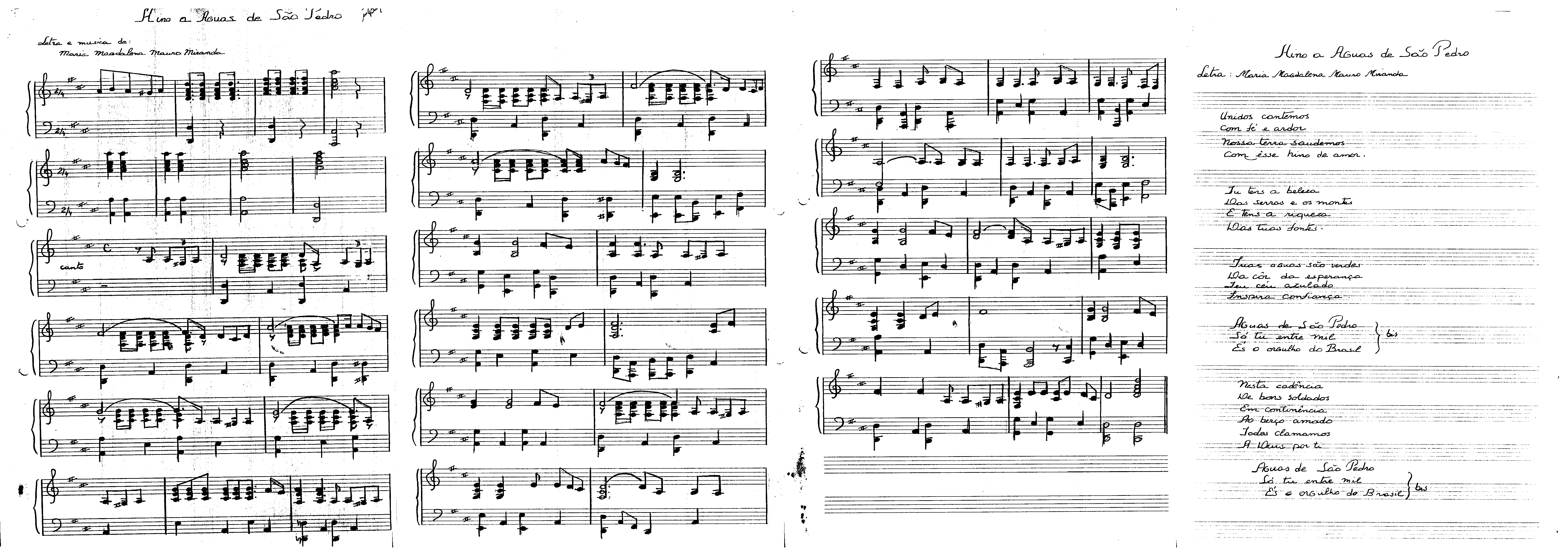
Sheet music for the anthem of the Brazilian municipality of Águas de São Pedro

Portuguese original Unidos cantemos Com fé e ardor Nossa terra saudemos Com esse hino de amor Tu tens a beleza Das serras e os montes E tens a riqueza Das tuas fontes Tuas águas são verdes Da cor da esperança Teu céu azulado Inspira confiança Águas de São Pedro Só tu entre mil És o orgulho do Brasil Águas de São Pedro Só tu entre mil És o orgulho do Brasil Nesta cadência De bons soldados Em continência Ao berço amado Todos clamamos A Deus por ti Águas de São Pedro Só tu entre mil És o orgulho do Brasil Águas de São Pedro Só tu entre mil És o orgulho do Brasil	English translation United we sing With faith and ardor Our land we salute With this hymn of love Thou hast the beauty Of the mountains and the hills And hast the wealth Of thy fountains Thy waters art green From the color of hope Thy blue sky Inspire confidence Águas de São Pedro Only thou between one thousand Art the pride of Brazil Águas de São Pedro Only thou between one thousand Art the pride of Brazil In this cadence Of good soldiers Saluting To the beloved birthplace All we cry out To God for thee Águas de São Pedro Only thou between one thousand Art the pride of Brazil Águas de São Pedro Only thou between one thousand Art the pride of Brazil
