= Badalona Museum =

Coordinates: 41.4525°N 2.2489°E

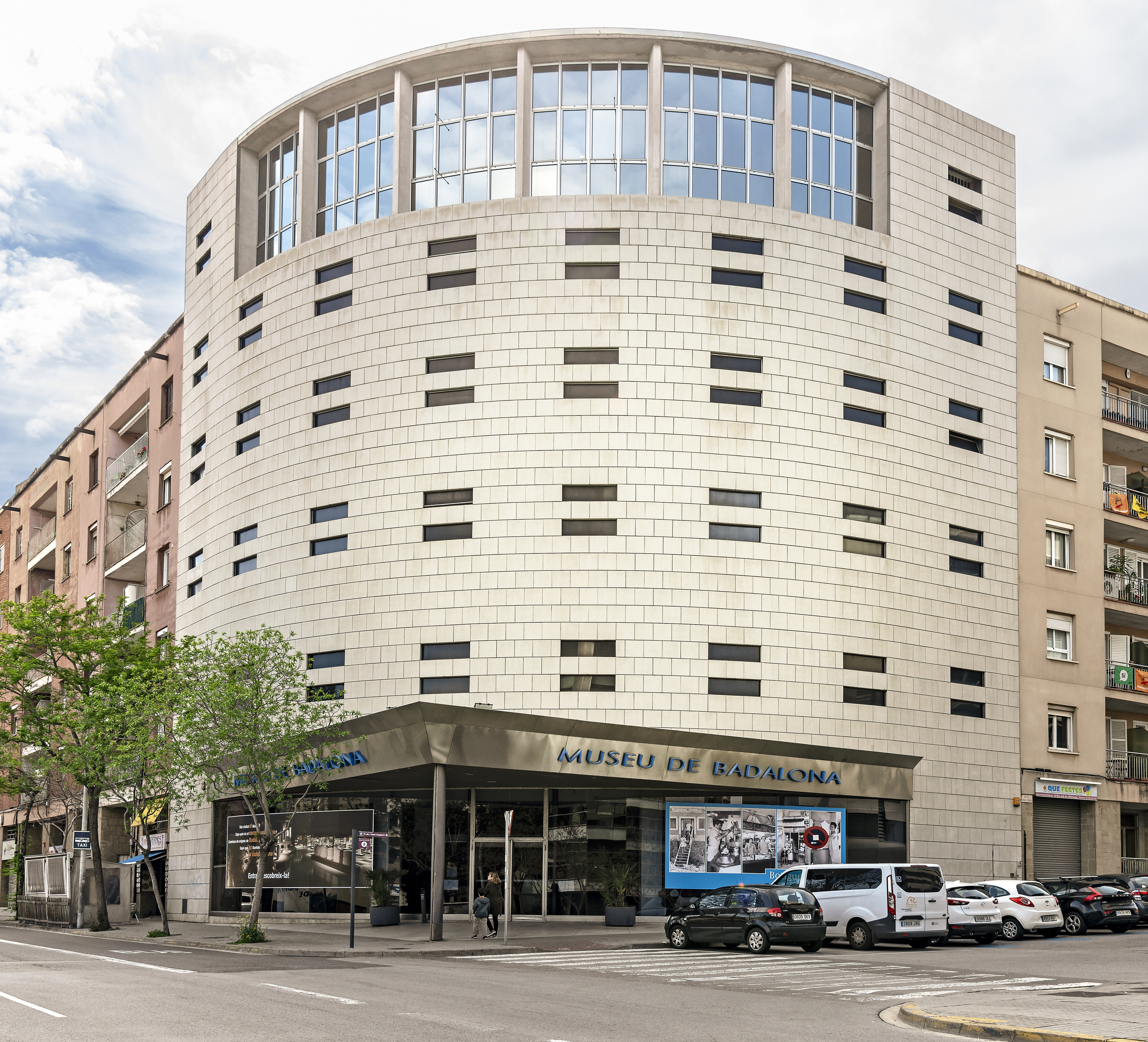
- The exterior of the Badalona Museum
- Established: 1966
- Location: Badalona, Catalonia, Spain
- Type: Archaeology museum
- Website: www.museudebadalona.cat

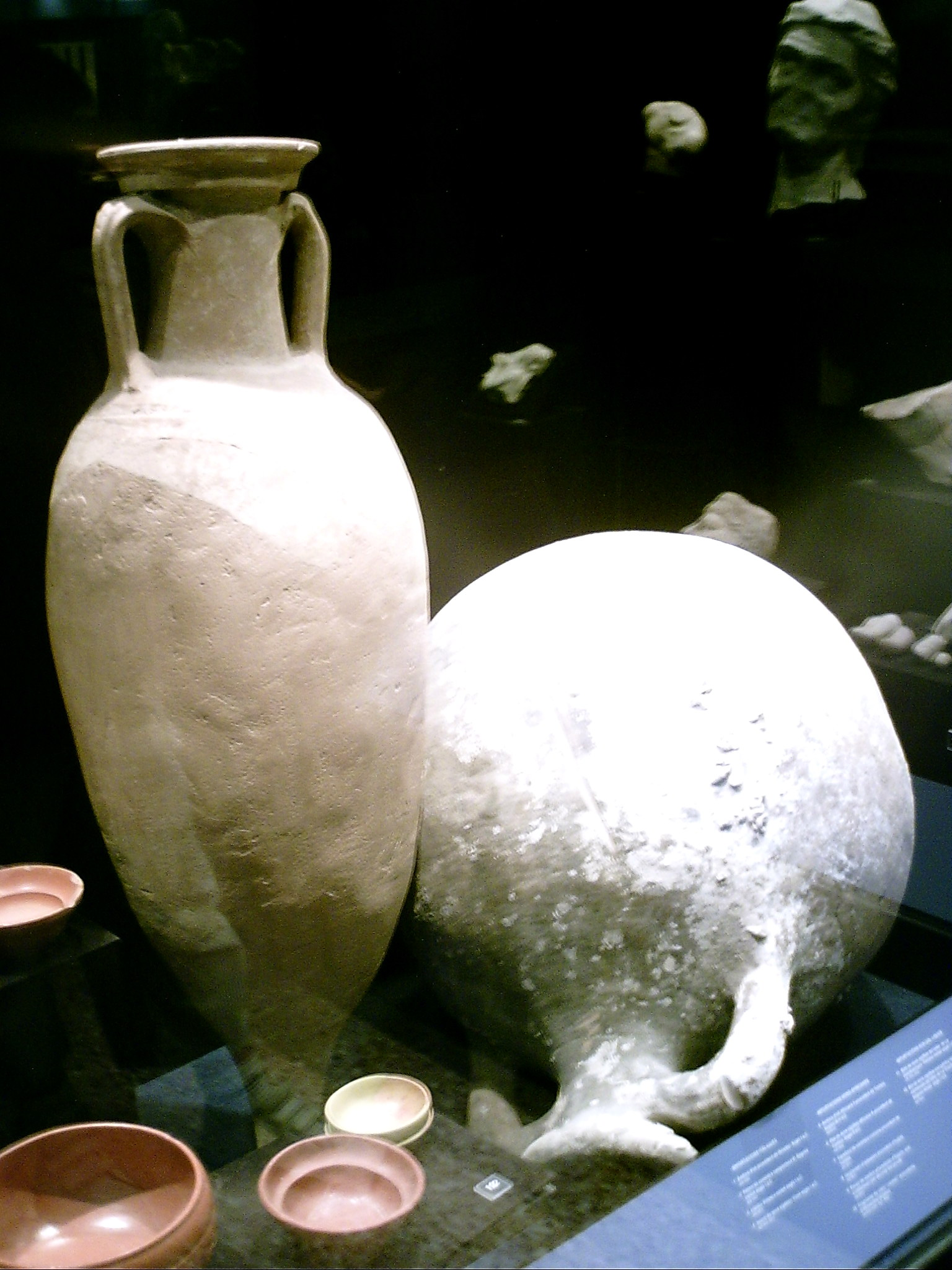
Roman amphora at Badalona Museum

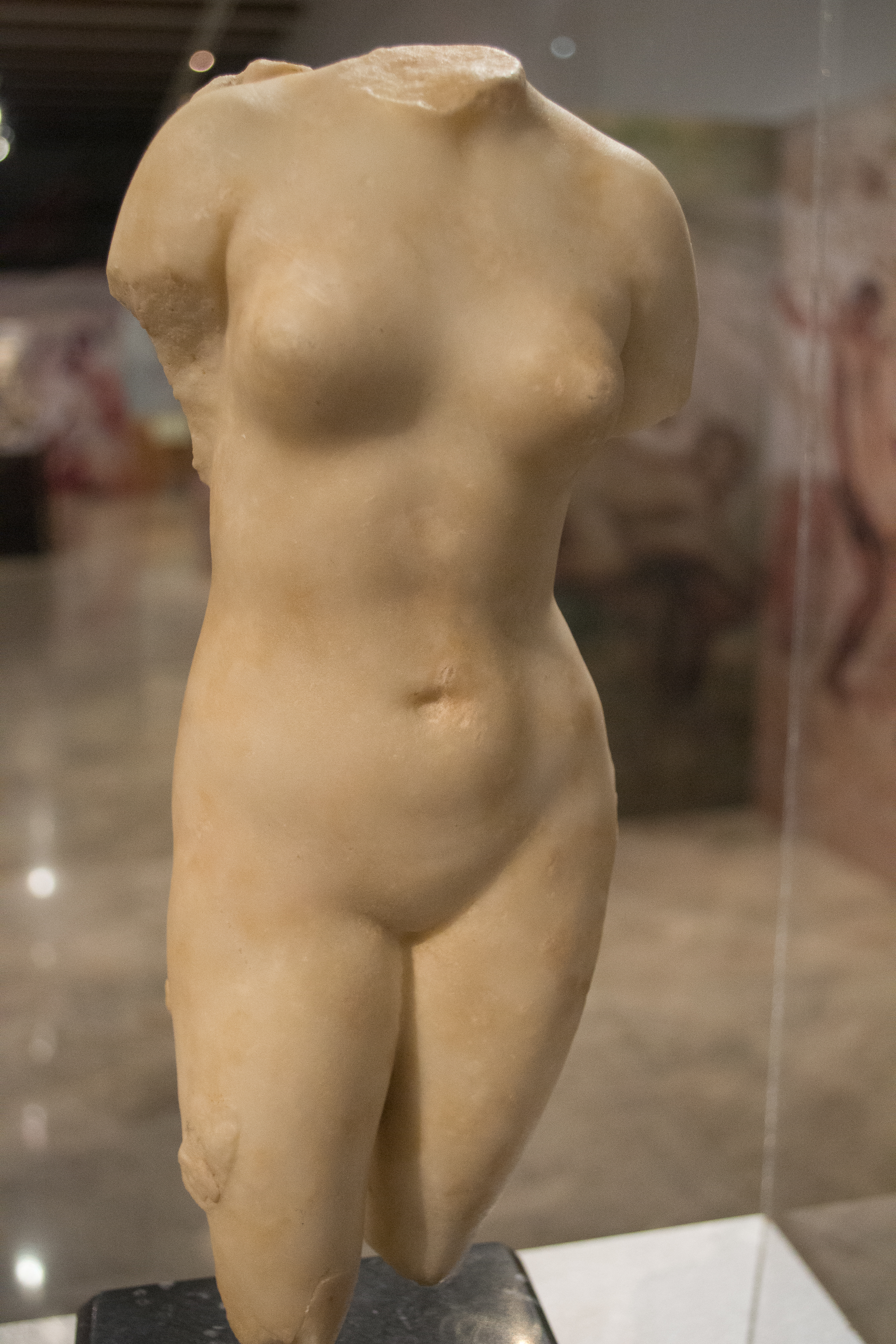
Venus de Badalona

The Badalona Museum, opened in 1966, hosts the remains of the Roman city of Baetulo. The remains include Roman baths, shops, housing complexes, and part of the cardo maximus and decumanus maximus. Its museum holds a collection of artifacts from its own excavations and objects from other eras relevant to the city.

In 2010, the decumanus site, with remains from the Cardo Maximus and the Decumanus Maximus, diverse shops or tavernae, and three insulae, became part of the visit. A permanent exhibition opened that describes the first settlements recorded in Badalona and the history and characteristics of Roman Baetulo. Some of its exhibits are the Venus of Badalona, the Tabula hospitalis, the ceramic vessel Vas de les Naus, the portrait of Agripina. and three Iberian steles.

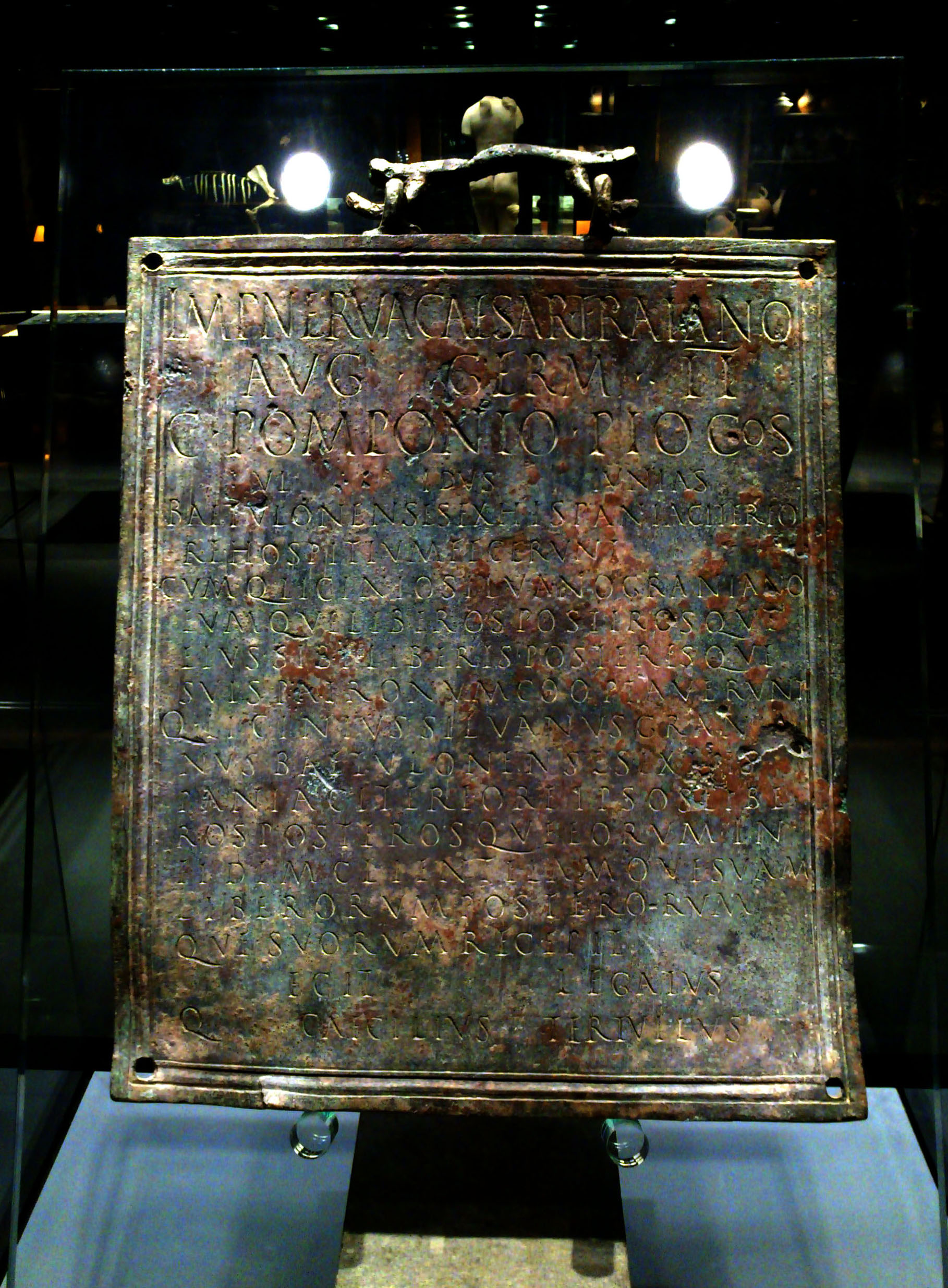
The tabula hospitalis on display, a legal document commemorating the hospitality pact between the Badalonians and Quintus Licinius Silvanus Granianus

== History ==
In 1955, archaeologist Josep Maria Cuyas i Tolosa discovered the ruins of the Baetulo Roman Thermae. By 1956, the underground and ground floors had been built and the museum opened its doors to the public. The entire building opened in 1966.
