= Venus de Badalona =

Ancient Roman marble statue of a woman

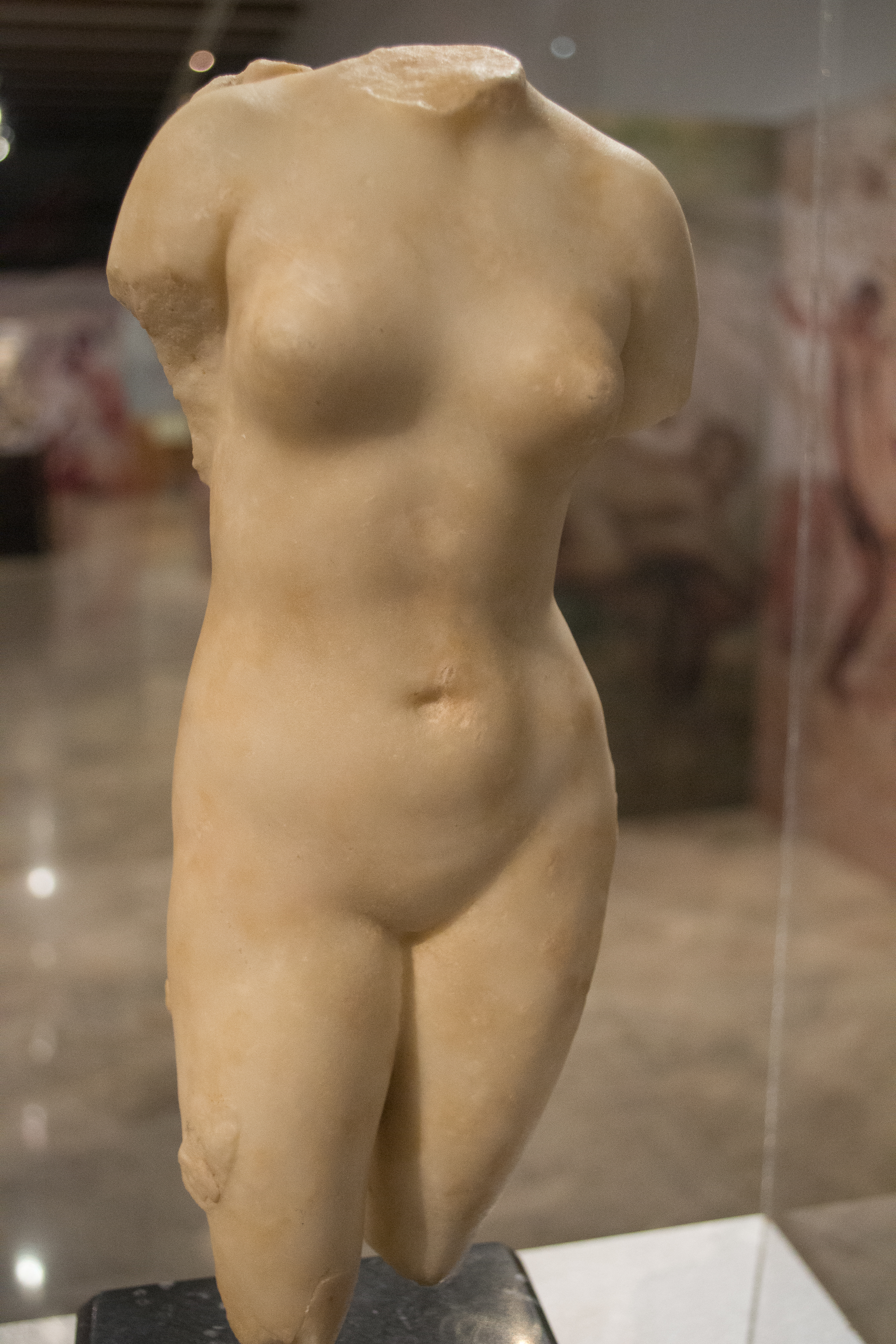
- Medium: Parian marble
- Subject: Venus
- Condition: Arms broken off; otherwise intact
- Location: Badalona Museum; Badalona

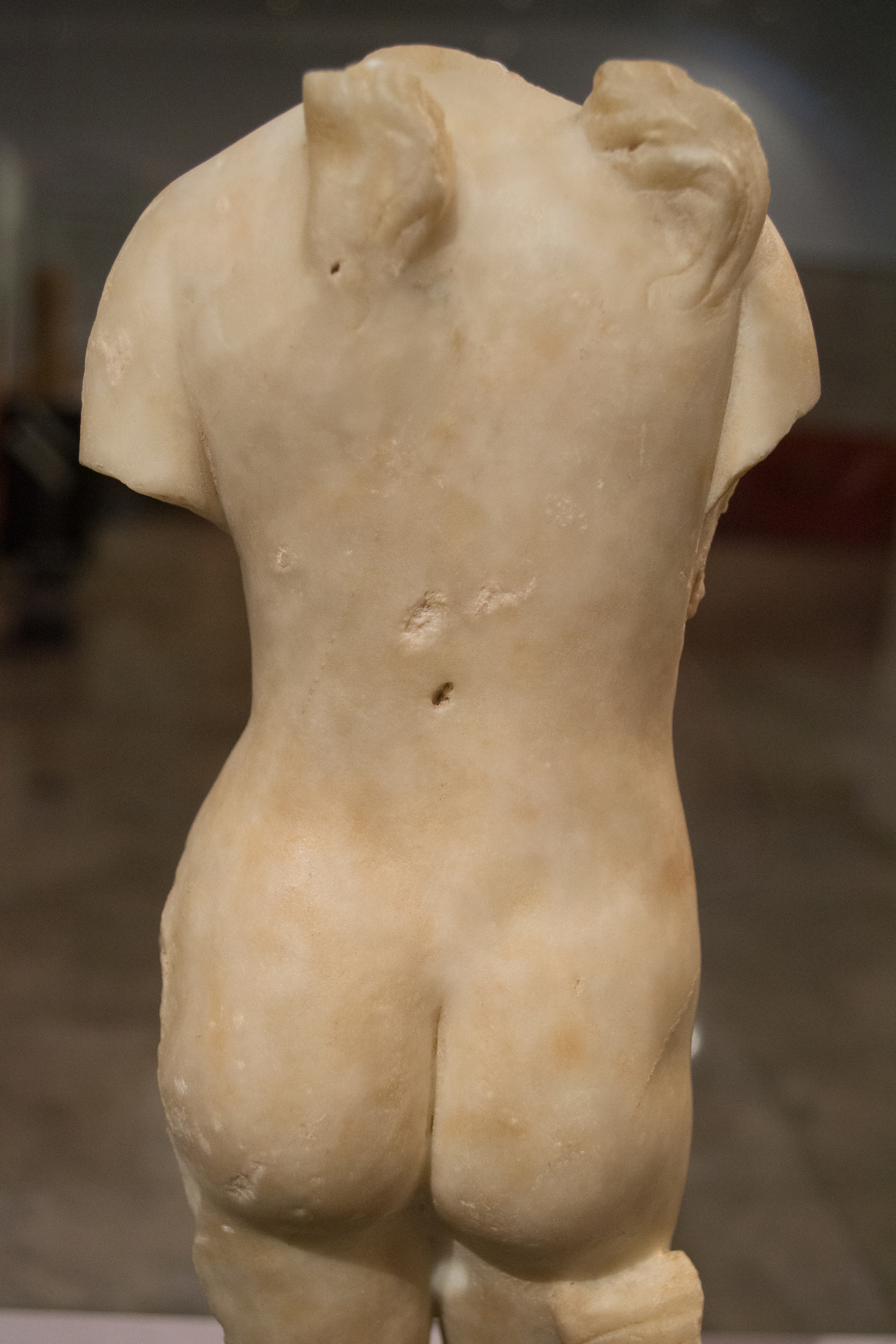
Venus de Badalona, back side

The Venus of Badalona is a marble sculpture, dated to the 1st century, kept in the Badalona Museum, located in the town of Badalona, in Catalonia.

It was discovered by Joaquim Font i Cussó in November 1934 while digging in Badalona.

The sculpture is used as the model for the statuette for the FILMETS Badalona Film Festival.
