= Insula dell'Ara Coeli =

Historic landmark of ancient Rome

Insula Romana of the Capitoline Hill
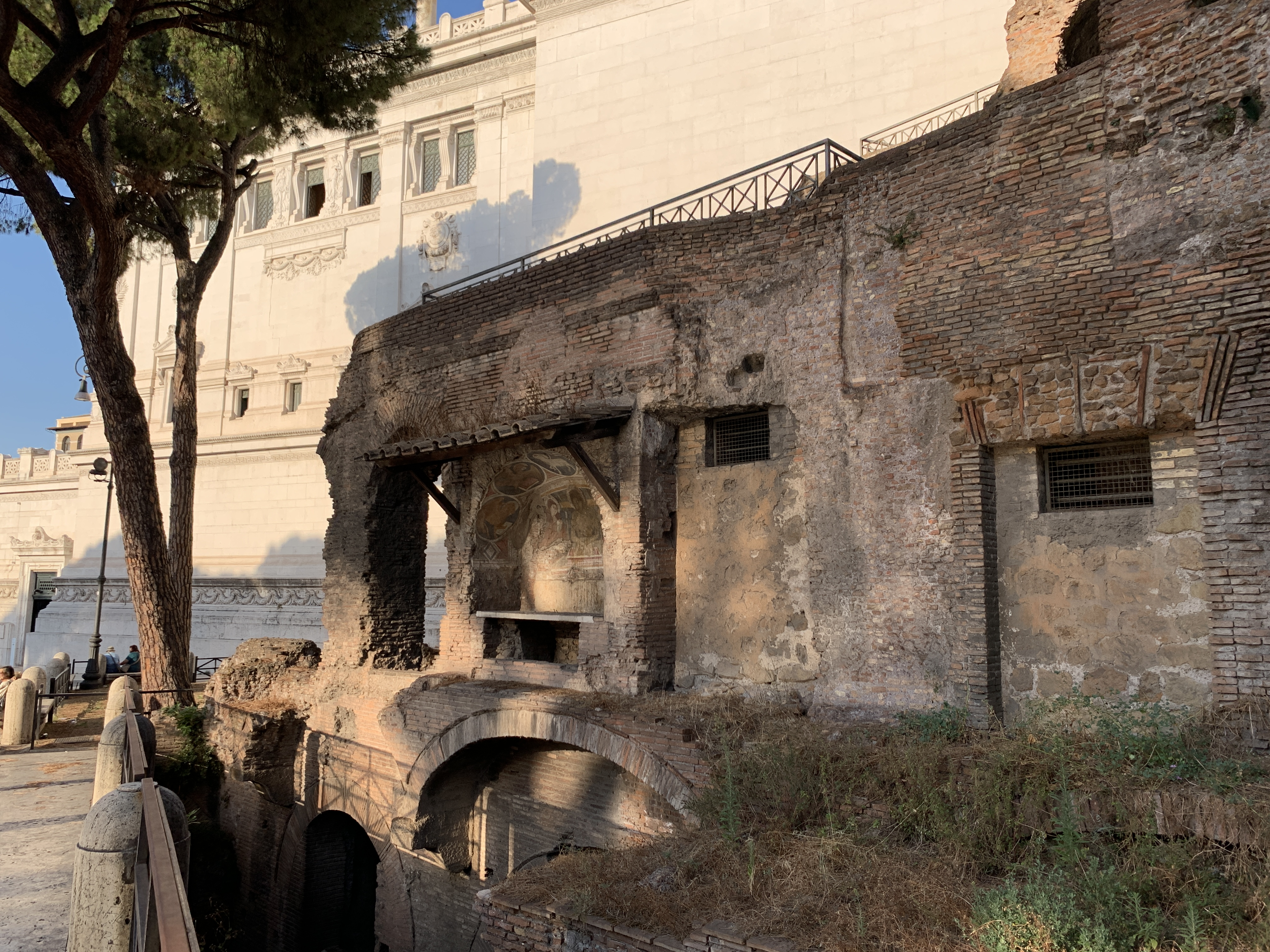

- Shown within Augustan Rome
- Interactive map of Insula Romana of the Capitoline Hill
- 41°53′38.64″N 12°28′56.33″E
- Type: residential estate
- Location: Regione VIII Forum Romanum

History
- Built: 2nd century AD

The Insula dell'Ara Coeli is one of the few surviving examples of an insula, the kind of apartment blocks where many Roman city dwellers resided. It was built during the 2nd century AD, and rediscovered under an old church when Benito Mussolini initiated a plan for massive urban renewal of Rome's historic Capitoline Hill neighbourhood.

== Research history ==
Regarding the archaeological evidence, A. M. Colini, I. Gismondi and a detailed description by J. E. Packer were followed by the classical archaeologist Sascha Priester, who examined the building between 1997 and 2002. He published his detailed results as a case study within his comprehensive project on the insulae of ancient Rome, collecting and analyzing the archaeological, epigraphic and ancient literary sources.

== Archaeological reconstruction ==
A. M. Colini and J. E. Packer assumed that the building, today known as the Insula dell'Ara Coeli, was the still-preserved part of a multi-story, four-wing building, that once grouped around an inner courtyard. Analyzing the archeological evidence, Priester showed that the existence of a south wing, hypothesized by previous researchers, cannot be proven; he proposed a new reconstruction of the entire area. Priester differentiated and described the west building, which, with the exception of its massive brick facade, is almost entirely covered by the modern Via del Teatro di Marcello.

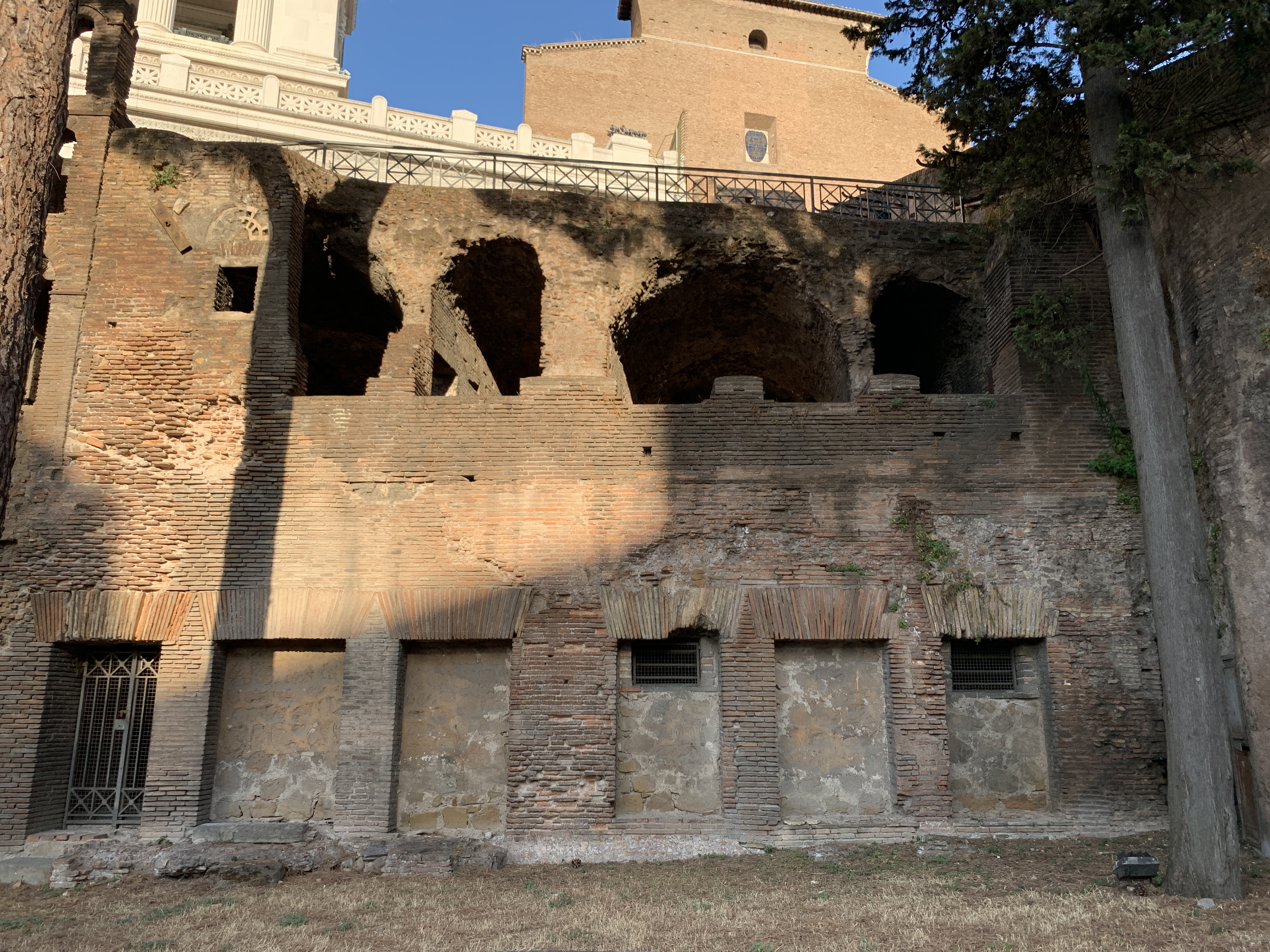
Tabernae

The size of the ground floor with its row of shops (tabernae) was up to 400 square metres (4,300 sq ft). In the north of the site stood the north building with a staircase, which was filled up again immediately after the excavation. The east building, now known as the Insula dell'Ara Coeli, is the most visible part of the complex since its rediscovery. Instead of an open courtyard, Priester reconstructed an alley covered with arches between the west building and east building. The portico pillars of the east building and the traces of arches, as well as the corresponding brick pillars of the opposing west building served as evidence. Following this reconstruction, the vaulted path (via tecta) as an alley (vicus) came from the west, turned south at the north building, and then ran between the west and east buildings, which differed in height. At least one branch of the path may also have led to the southern facade of the east building. By adding the portico to the east building, the width of the street was reduced to about 3.8 metres (12 ft); the alley was paved safely in a secondary phase and was finally abandoned as a traffic route in late antiquity.

== Floors ==
Four floors remain. The ground floor consisted of shops that faced the surrounding streets, with the owners using ladders to access living quarters immediately above. A mezzanine lay above the shop level. The two remaining floors seem to have been designed as residences. The third floor appears to have been large, spacious apartments. The fourth floor had a corridor with a series of three-room suites leading off of it. Archaeologist Andrew Wallace-Hadrill suggested that with a little imagination, these suites are comparable to apartments in which many 21st-century Roman families live. Archaeologists believe the structure was originally built with at least five stories.

It has been estimated that the insula romana could host around 380 people.

== Bibliography ==
- Filippo Coarelli, Guida archeologica di Roma, Arnoldo Mondadori Editore, Verona 1975.
- J. E. Packer, La casa di Via Giulio Romano, BCom 81, 1968/69, 169 ff.
- Sascha Priester, Ad summas tegulas. Untersuchungen zu vielgeschossigen Gebäudeblöcken mit Wohneinheiten und insulae im kaiserzeitlichen Rom, L'Erma Di Bretschneider, Rome 2002.

Preceded by Villa of Livia	Landmarks of Rome; Insula dell'Ara Coeli	Succeeded by Villa of the Quintilii
