= Villa of Livia =

Ancient Roman house near Rome, Italy

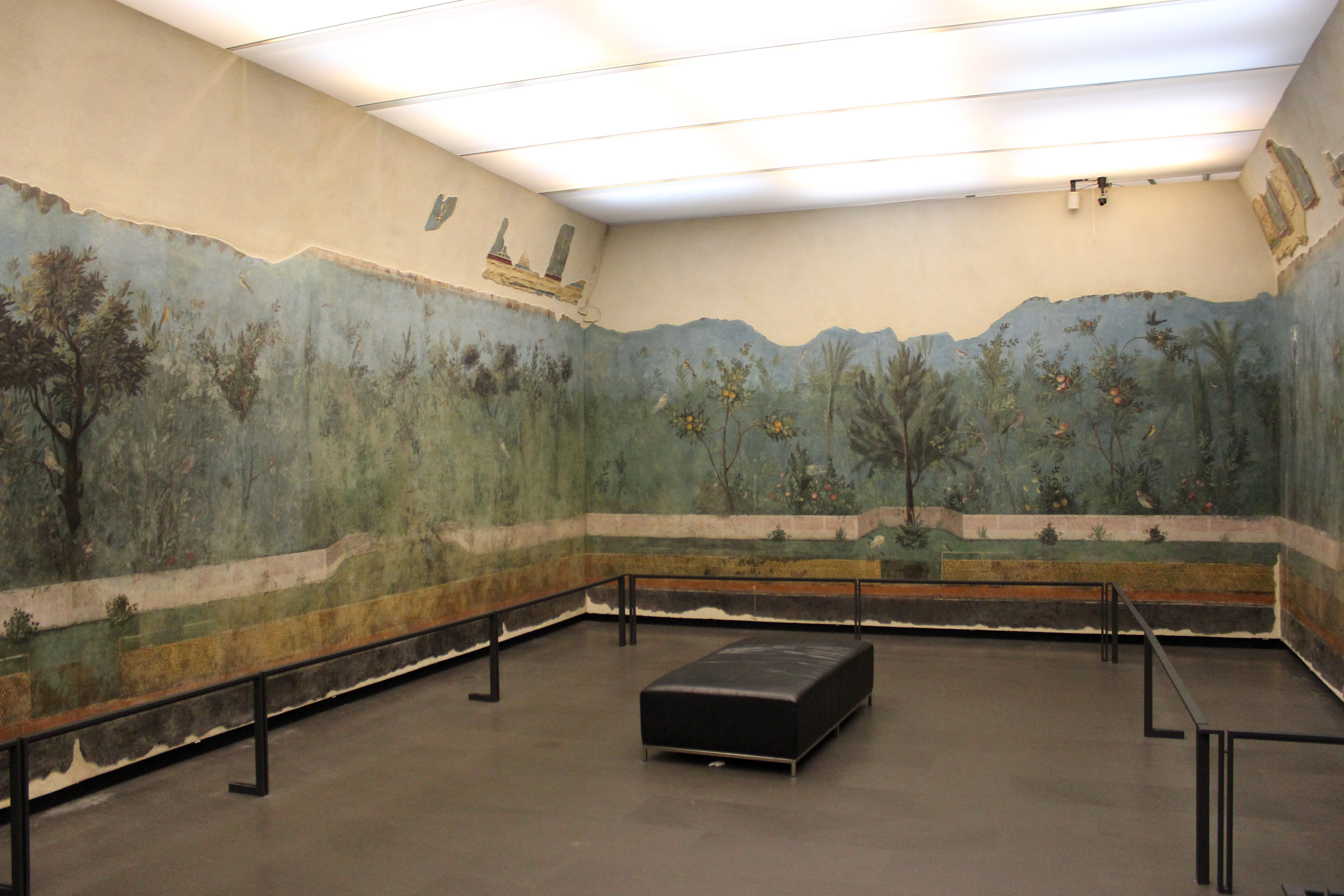
- One of the rooms of the villa
- Interactive map of Villa of Livia
- 42°00′07″N 12°29′37″E

The Villa of Livia (Latin: Villa ad Gallinas Albas, lit. 'House of the White Hens') is an ancient Roman villa at Prima Porta, 12 kilometres (7.5 mi) north of Rome, Italy, along the Via Flaminia.

The Villa of Livia may have been part of Livia Drusilla's dowry that she brought when she married Octavian (later called the emperor Augustus), her second husband, in 39 BC. Some scholars believe that Livia may have received the site from her first husband, Tiberius Claudius Nero. However, most likely, it may also have been a gift given to her by Octavian upon their betrothal.

The ancient sources (e.g. Suetonius) tell us that Livia returned to this villa following the marriage. It was her sumptuous country residence complementing her house on the Palatine Hill in Rome. Livia was the main commissioner of the land and the original owner.

== Location ==
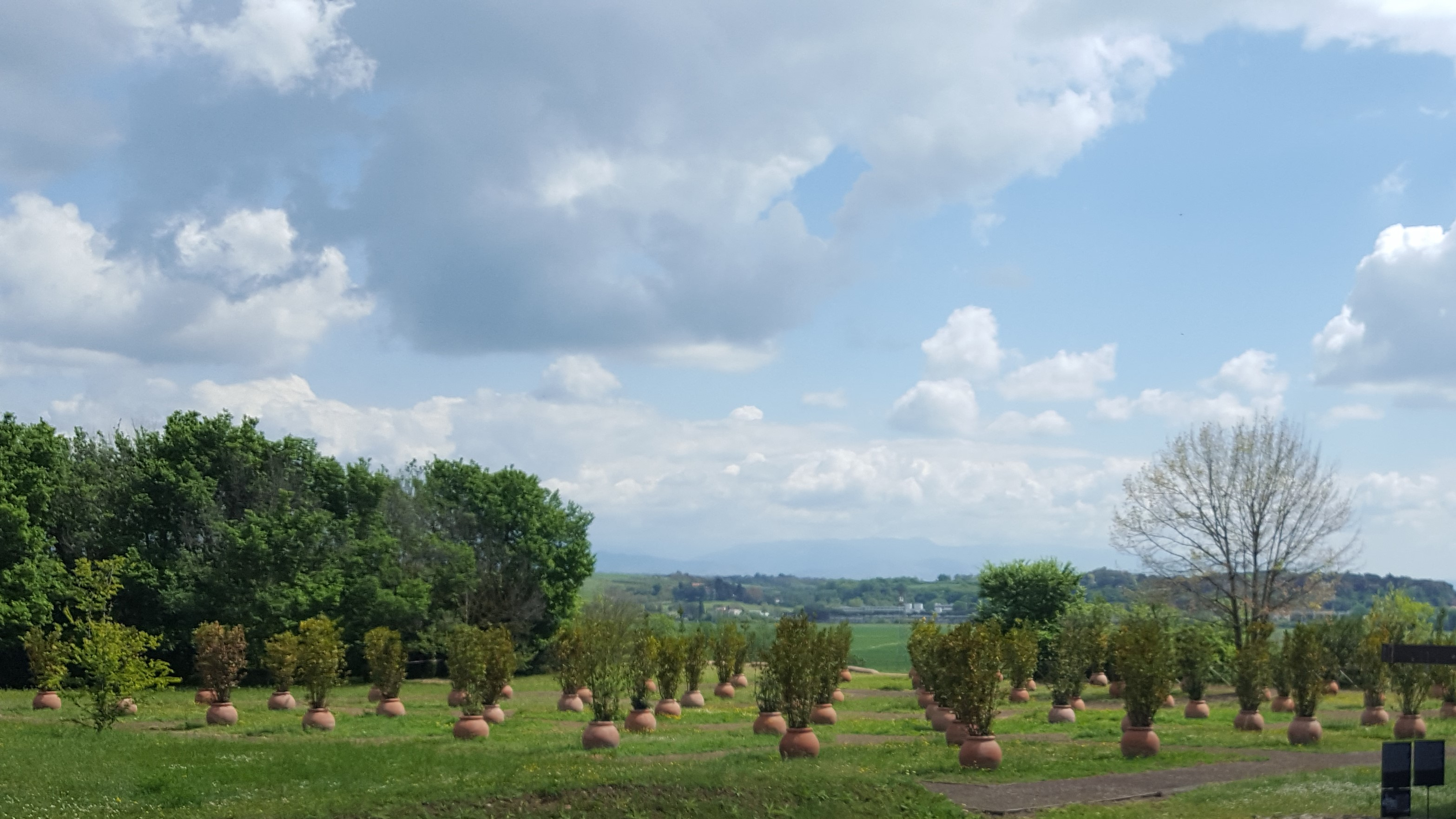
Garden of Villa di Livia

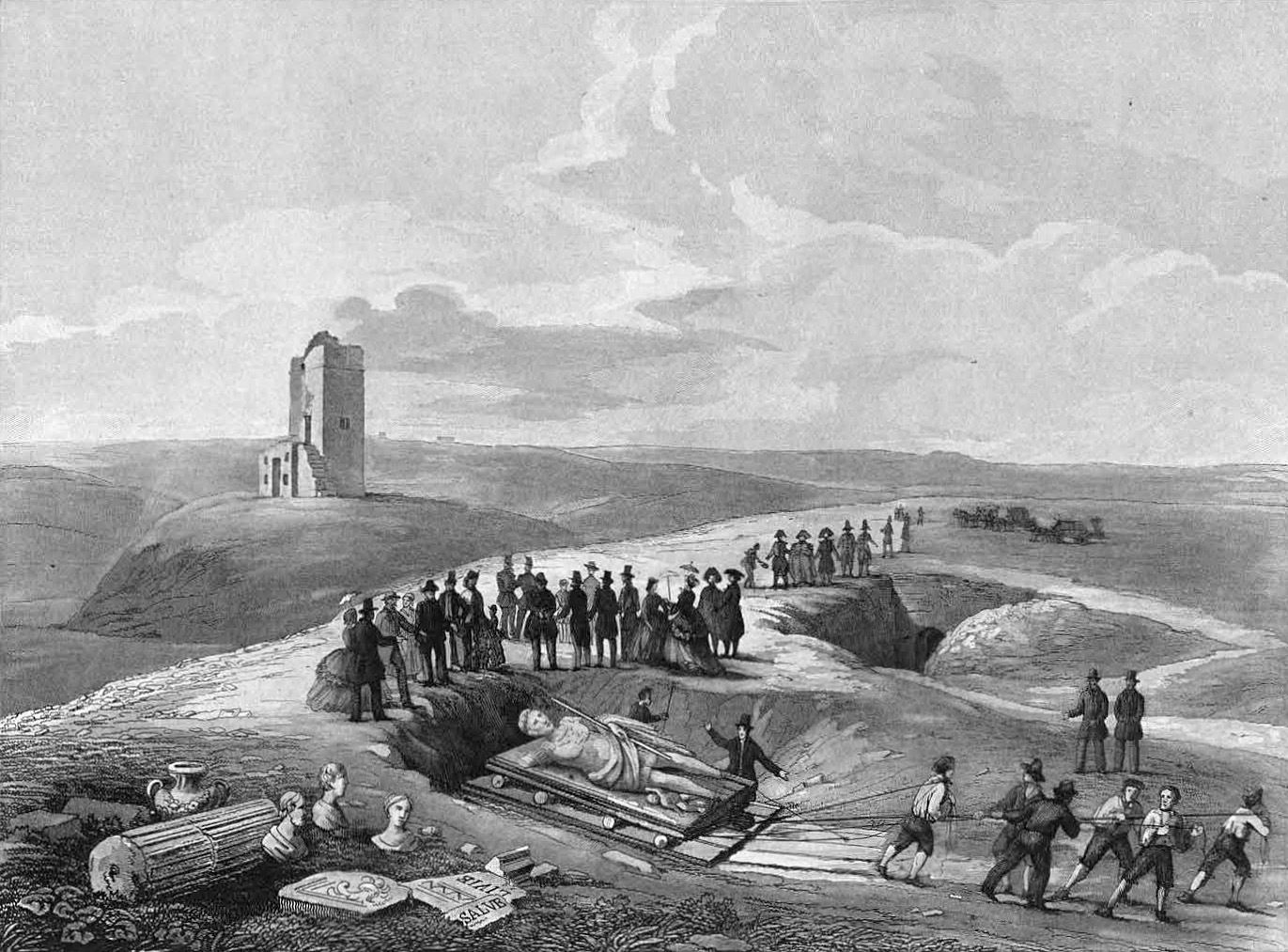
lithograph of 1865 depicting the discovery of the Augustus of Prima Porta. The tower in the background is the Torre di Orlando.

The villa occupied the height dominating the view down the Tiber Valley to Rome. Some of the walling that retained the villa's terraces can still be seen. Originally built on a twenty meter plateau fourteen kilometers north of Rome, the villa had views of Rome, the Tiber Valley, and the Apennine mountain rages.

The location was strategically important due to the iron-rich cliffs of red tuff that approach the river Tiber at this point, the confluence of several roads, and the northern entrance to Rome. The name Prima Porta ("First Door") came from an arch of the aqueduct over the Via Flaminia, which brought water to the villa and which travelers saw as the first indication of having reached Rome.

Remarkable frescoes of garden views were found which have since been removed to the Palazzo Massimo museum in Rome.

== History ==
The villa was built and modified in nine phases, from the late republican age to the 6th century AD. After Livia, it remained an imperial residence.

Its Latin name, Villa Ad Gallinas Albas, referred to its breed of white chickens, which was said by Suetonius to have auspiciously omened origins. The area acclaimed the name Ad Gallinas Albas because of the legend of white fowl carrying a laural branch in it beak that fell from the talons of an eagle and onto Livia Drusilla's lap, later to be Augustus's wife. It is said that the emperor kept the fowl and its offsprings, and planted the laurel which grew wreaths that crowned him in his triumphs.

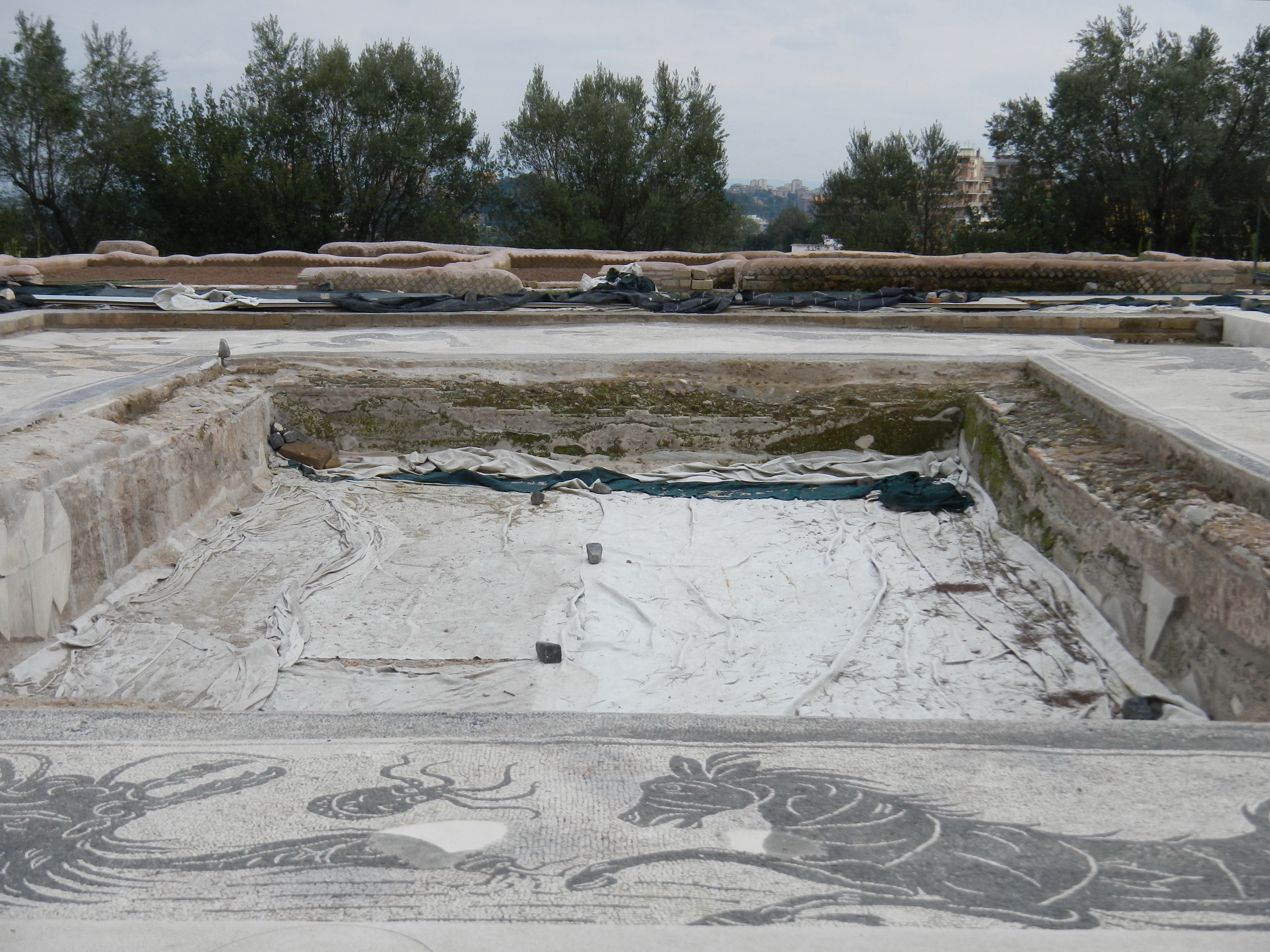
The piscina of the villa.

Excavation from 2002 led to the discovery of the front of the platform structure (basis villae) crowned by a windowed portico (porticus fenestrata) and the rooms between this and the southern portico of a peristyle. An Augustan period peristyle was discovered in the central area. In the Flavian period a natatio (swimming pool) was added in the garden of the peristyle and connected to the new baths. A mosaic featuring a marine thiasos was added later to the pool.

The upper terrace had a three sided portico with a belvedere over the Tiber valley.

== Rediscovery ==
The statue of Augustus found in the Villa.

The site was rediscovered and explored as early as 1596, but it was not recognized as the Villa of Livia until the 19th century. In 1863–1864, a marble krater carved in refined low relief was discovered at the site. On 20 April 1863, the famous heroic marble statue of Augustus, the Augustus of Prima Porta, was found at the villa; it is now in the Vatican Museums (Braccio Nuovo). The magisterial Augustus is a marble copy of a bronze statue that celebrated the return in 20 BC of the military standards captured by the Parthians in 53 BC after the defeat of Crassus at Carrhae.

In the 19th century, the villa belonged to the Convent of Santa Maria in Via Lata. The villa and gardens have been excavated and can be visited. There are three vaulted subterranean rooms, the largest of which contained superb illusionistic frescoes of garden views in which all the plants and trees flower and fruit at once. These have since been removed to Rome, where, following cleaning and restoration, they have been reinstalled in the Palazzo Massimo. The vault above the fresco was covered with stucco reliefs, some of which survive.

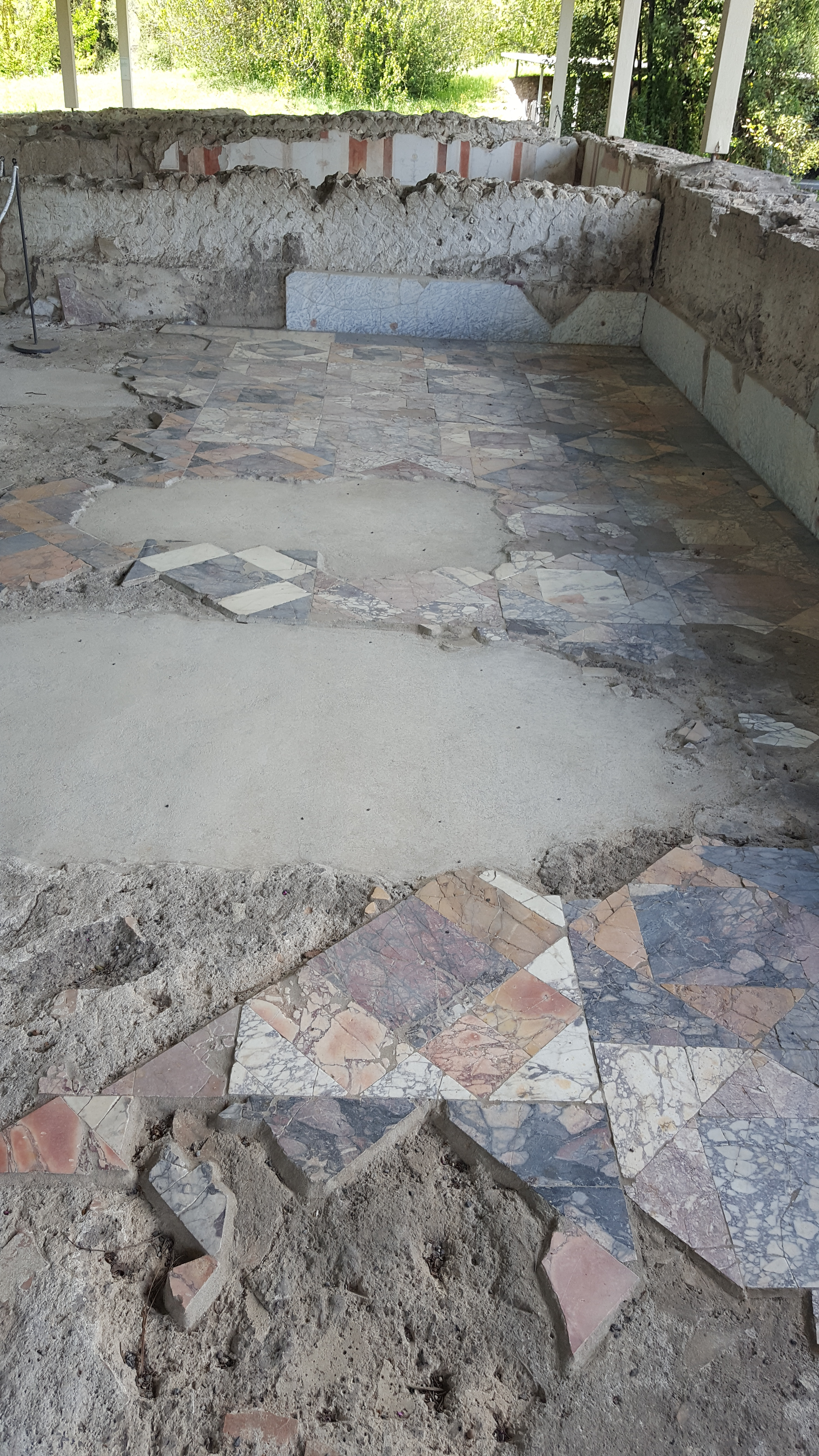
Opus Sectile Floor

A new series of more meticulous modern excavations was initiated in 1970. More modern scientific work began at the site in 1995, carried out by the Soprintendenza Archeologica di Roma and directed by Professor Gaetano Messineo, in tandem with the Swedish Institute in Rome.

== Garden Room Fresco ==
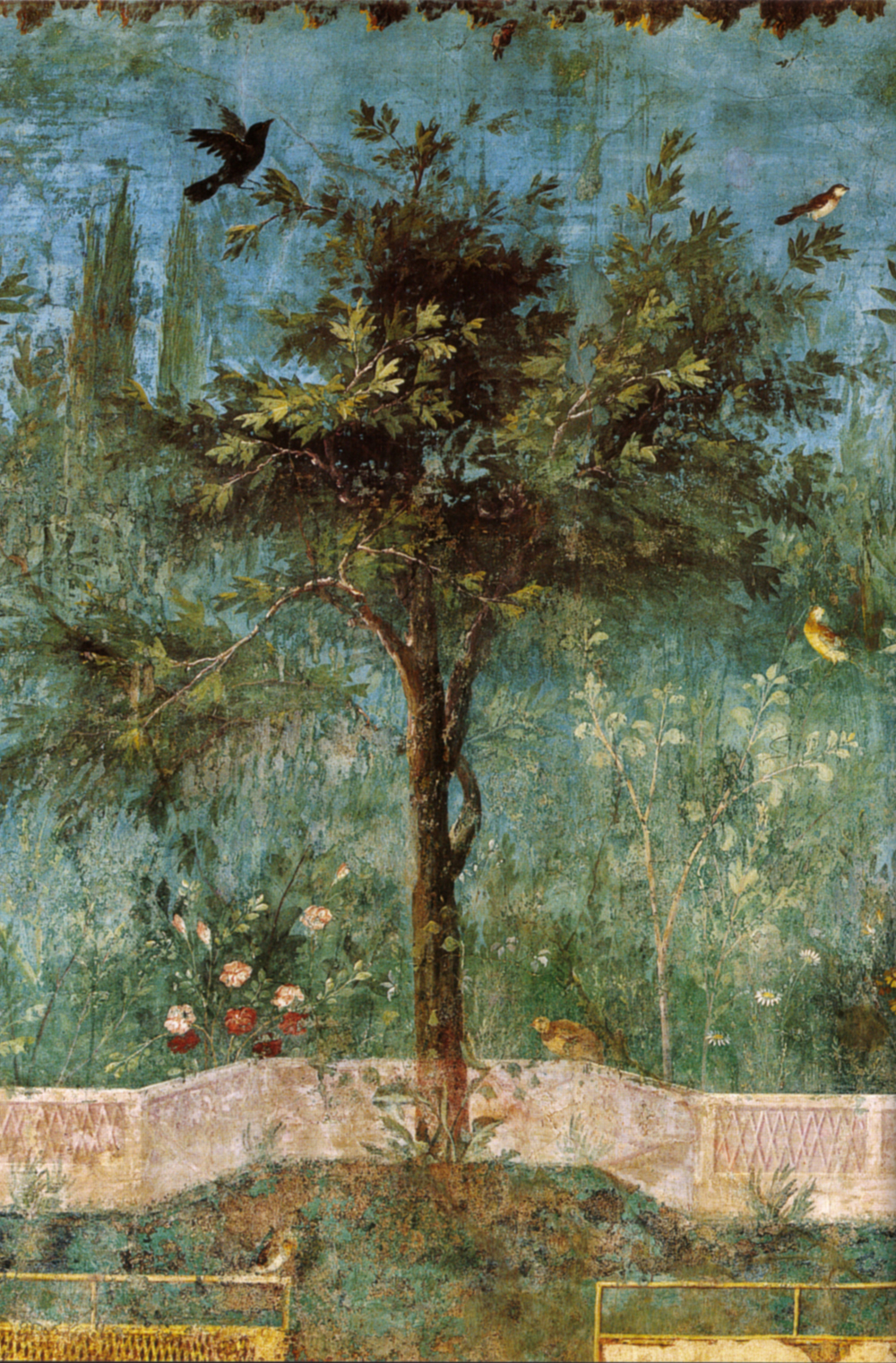
Oak tree with birds, wall painting in the underground garden

The Villa of Livia is most famously known for its fresco room. This so-called "garden room" was once the adorned semi-underground room located at the imperial estate of emperor Augustus, who ruled during the Roman Empire, and his wife Livia. The room exhibits floor-to-ceiling frescoes of a garden that fades into the distance.

Once accessed through a dark five meter long hallway obstructing a visitor's vision as they adjust to the darkness and then the light again as they enter the room, visitors are transported to a garden paradise. This is believed to have created a space of relaxation and fun during the summer months as an escape from the heat outdoors, providing a greater feeling of refreshment. The room could have also retained heat in the winter months providing multifunctionality throughout the year.

There are many conflicting beliefs concerning what the garden room was used for, however, it is most commonly believed that the space served as a triclinium, where guest were entertained, meals were served, and people could lie down on beds and cushions around a low central table.

The purpose and layout of the Villa Livia are important to the understanding of both the purpose and layout of the space. The Roman activity of "[d]ining was much more than the satisfaction of human need — it was a ritual of great social and political significance." In terms of layout, the room is underground and dimensionally 40 feet long by 20 feet wide. There are no separating moldings, no painted architecture, and no visible structural elements — the room unexpectedly transports the viewer "outside" in a completely enclosed underground space with a barrel-vaulted ceiling. The enclosure is striking because of the spatial play of the room itself with its illusionistic quality, there is incredible accuracy of plant species, and the variety provides a landscape that in reality cannot exist as one garden. A low stone wall contains the thickest and largest plantings, and in between the viewer and the space rests another fence with a narrow grass walkway. The garden layout encompasses a "perfect combination of variety and abundance with stylization and order" as nature grows freely while simultaneous evidence of human activity is present, specifically as some birds exist in cages and a neatly manicured lawn is visible closest to the dining room space.

External videos
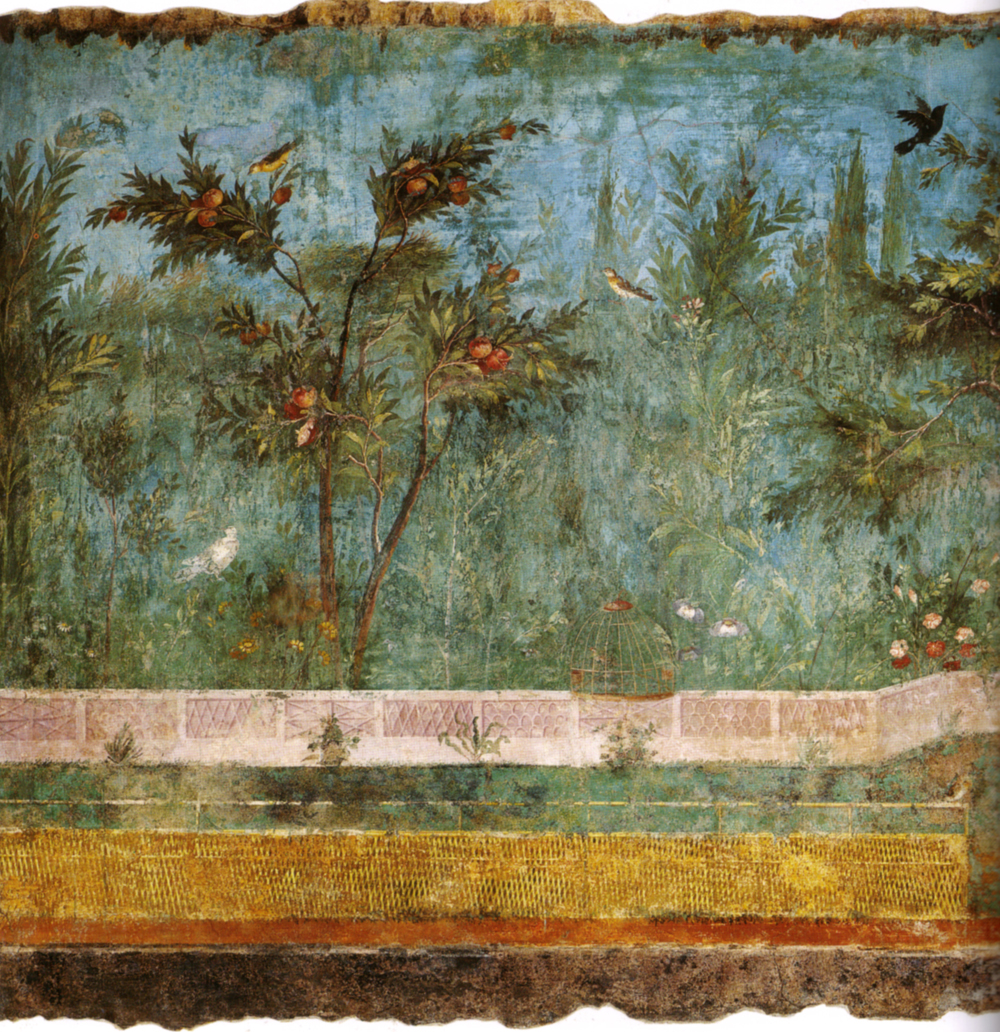
- , Painted Garden, Villa of Livia

The trees in the background of the fresco become less detailed when compared to those in the foreground with tendrils falling over the painted stone wall. All floras in the room are in bloom and all fruits are ripe, even though they flowered and ripened at different times of the year, which is thought to represent the prosperity of the union between Livia and Augustus and the couple's rulership of a new era in Roman History. The taxonomic interpretation of the garden fresco reveal twenty-four different species of floras within twenty families including autochthonous, or indigenous, and exotic plants with the painterly precision of botany, as well as zoology. The fresco includes a variety of birds perched on tree limbs or in flight that creates movement along with a painted breeze that moves the foliage.

The sky is painted with Egyptian blue which was a rare and expensive color at the time, making the room feel open and light, set in a lush, brightly colored, airy environment, despite being underground and indoors.

== Gallery ==
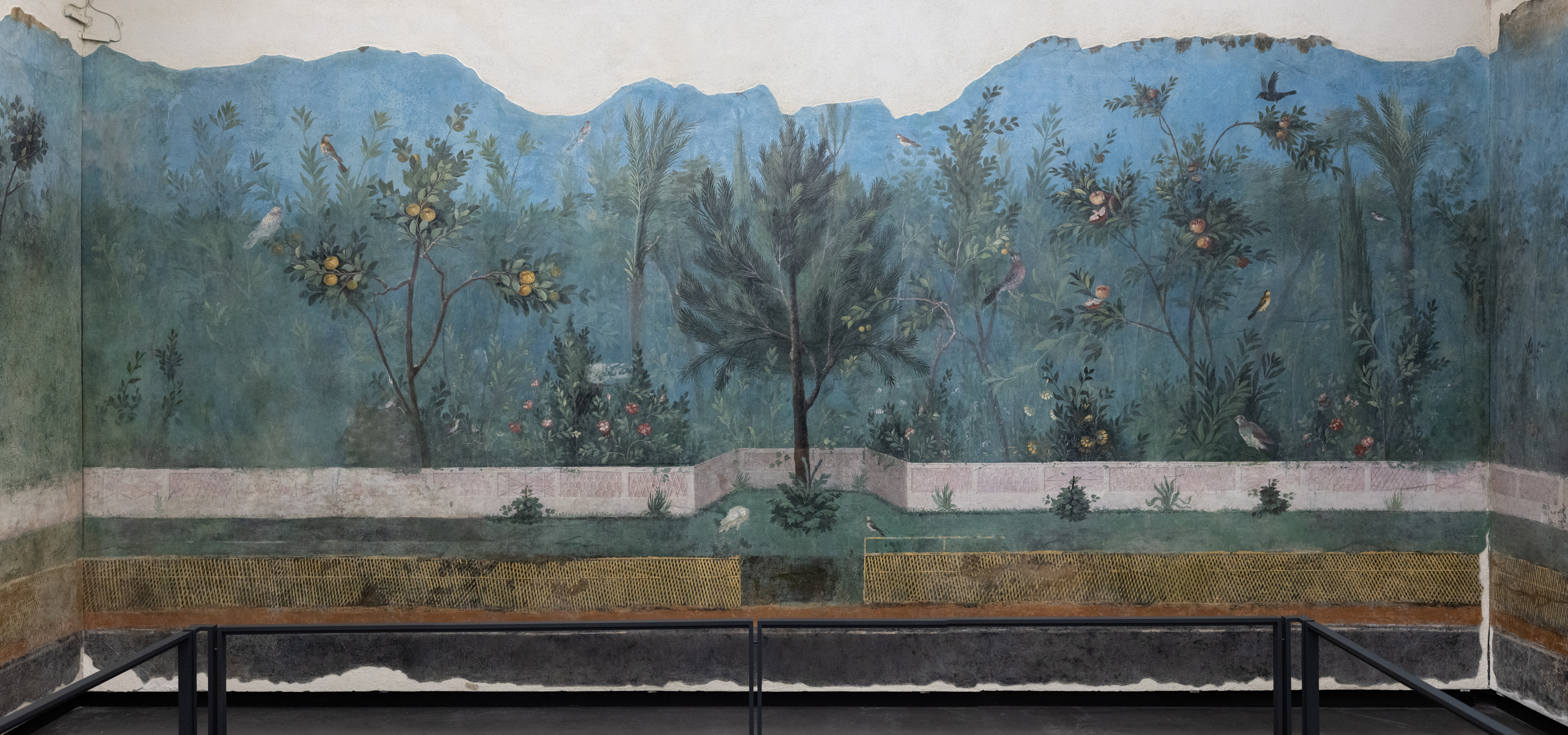

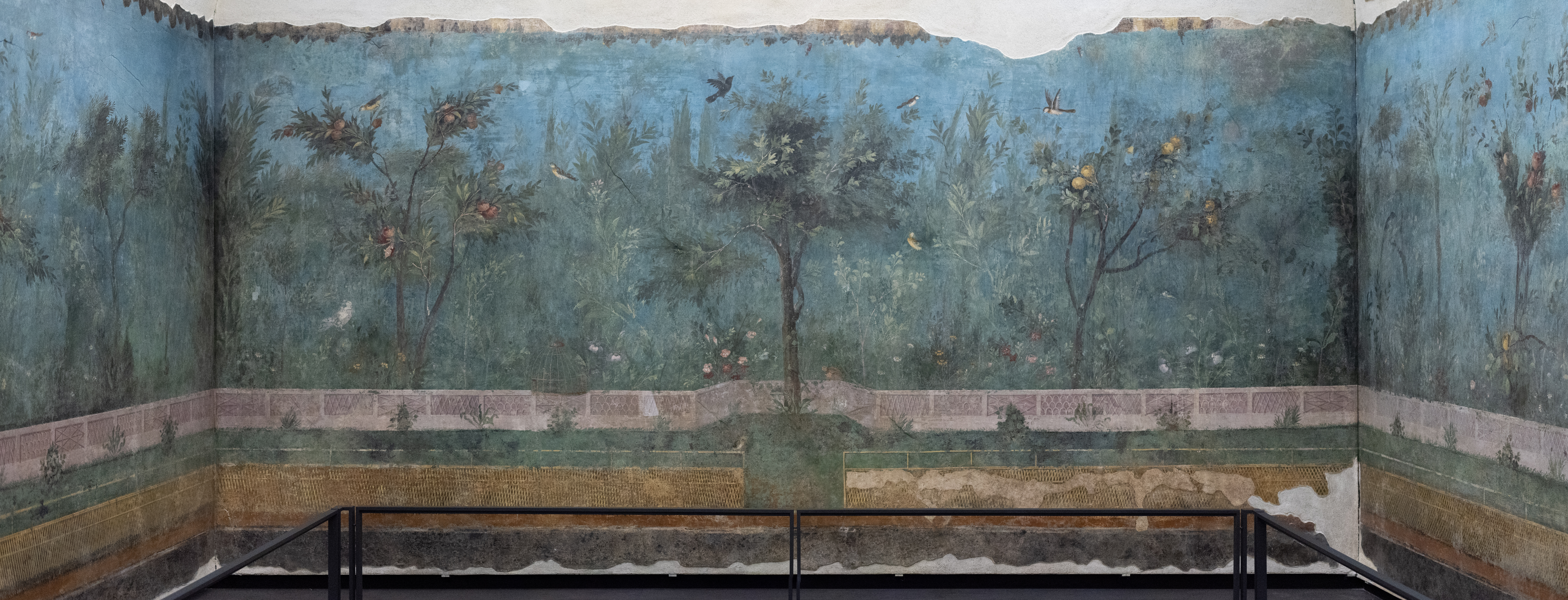

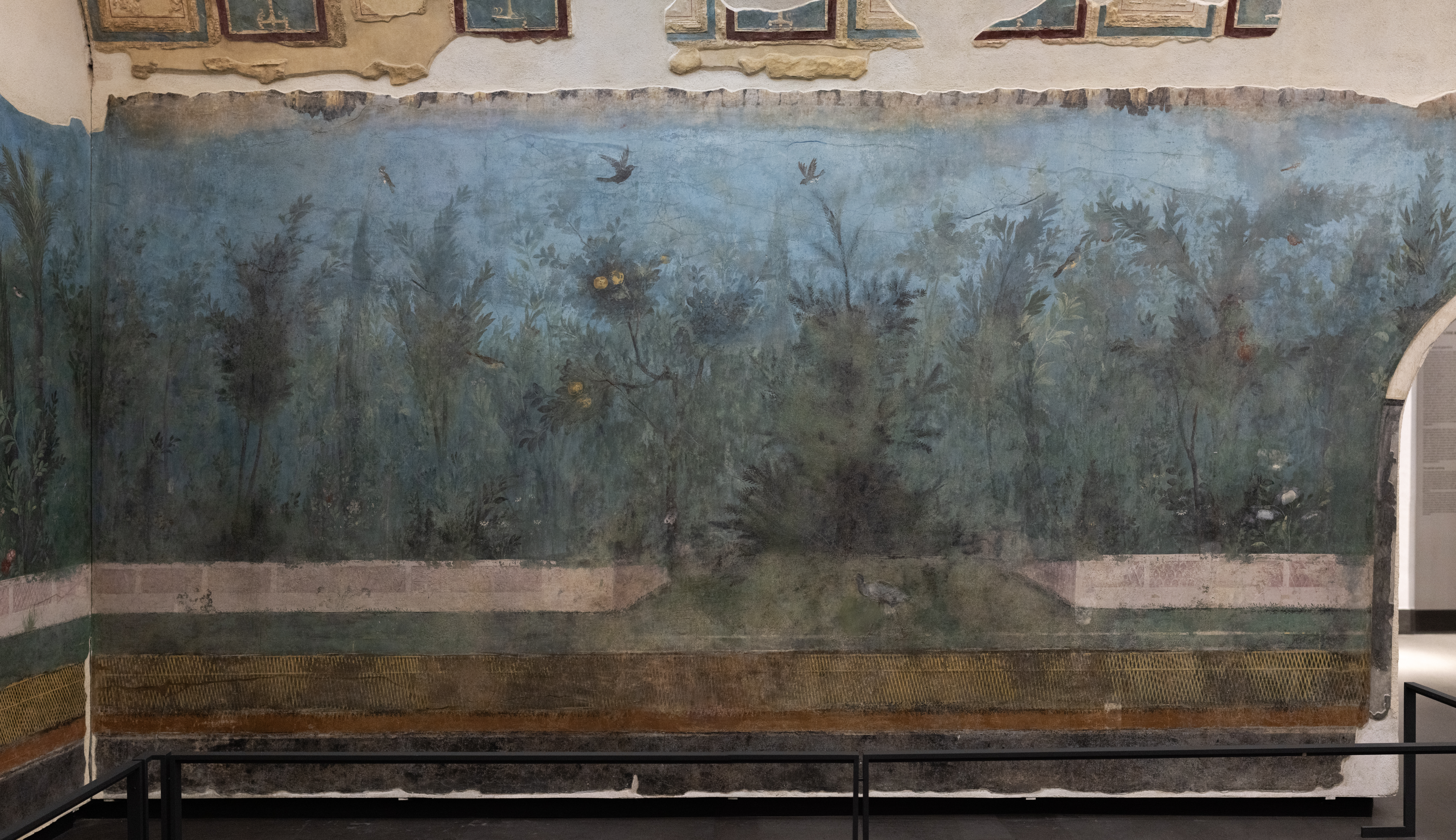

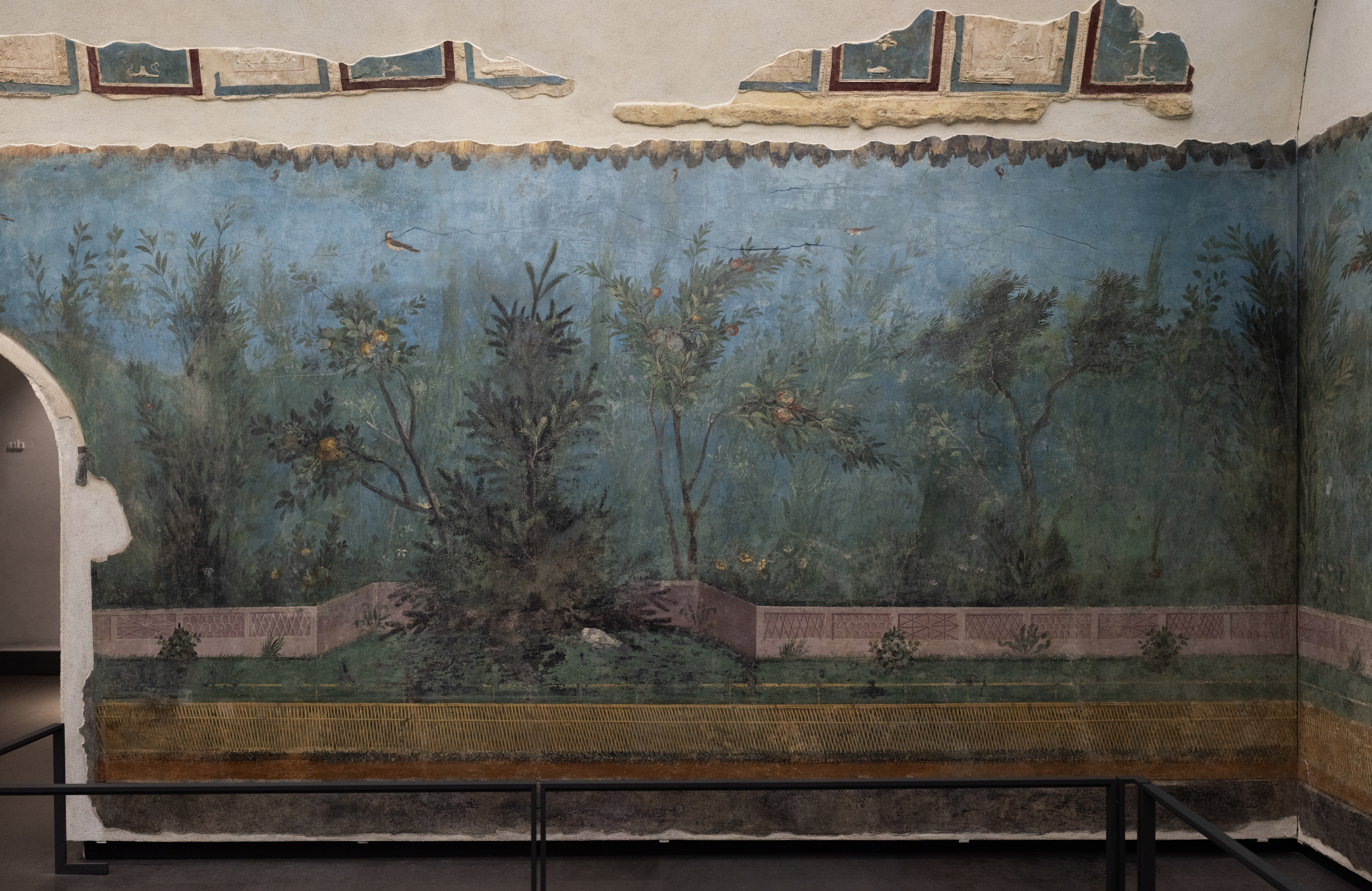

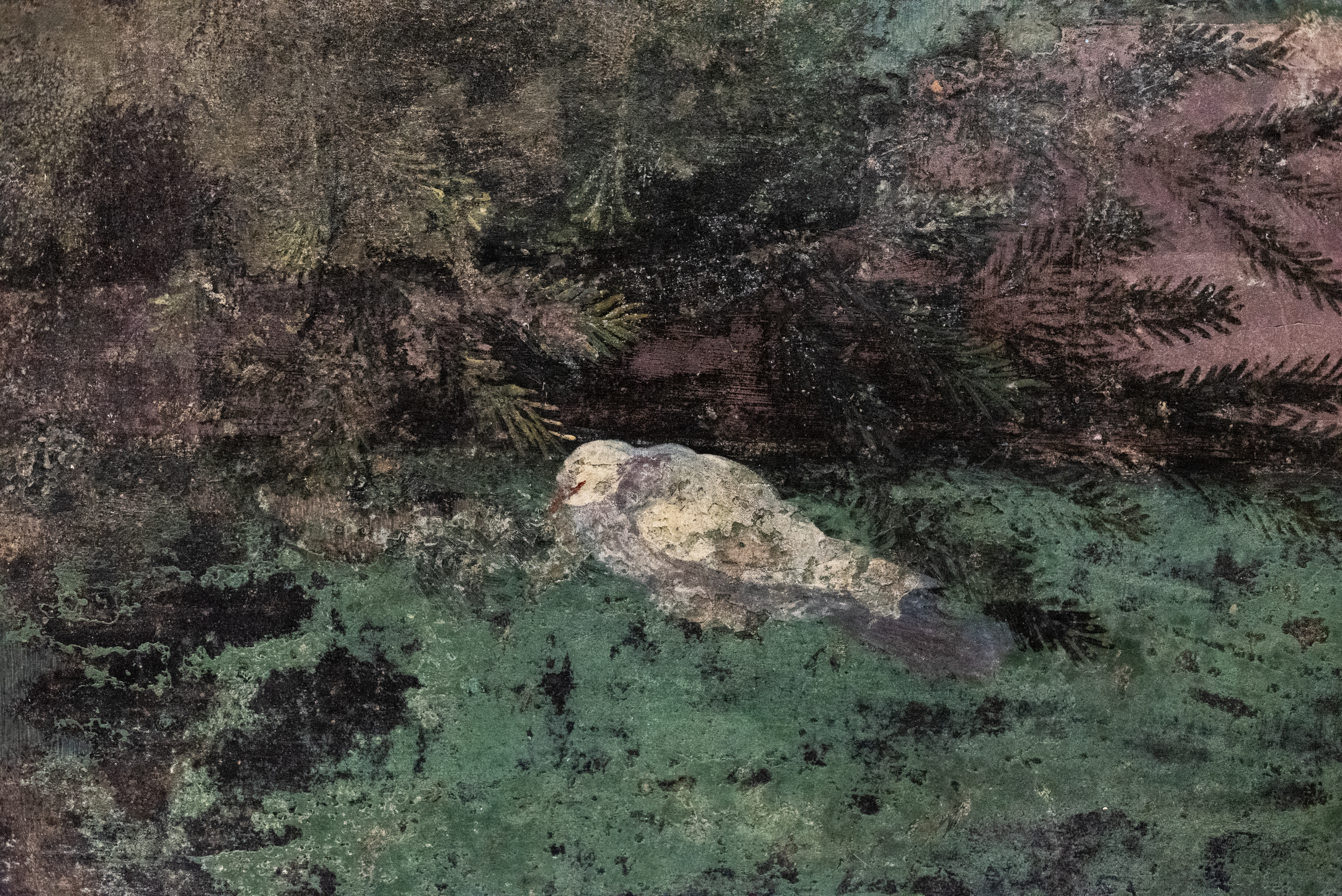

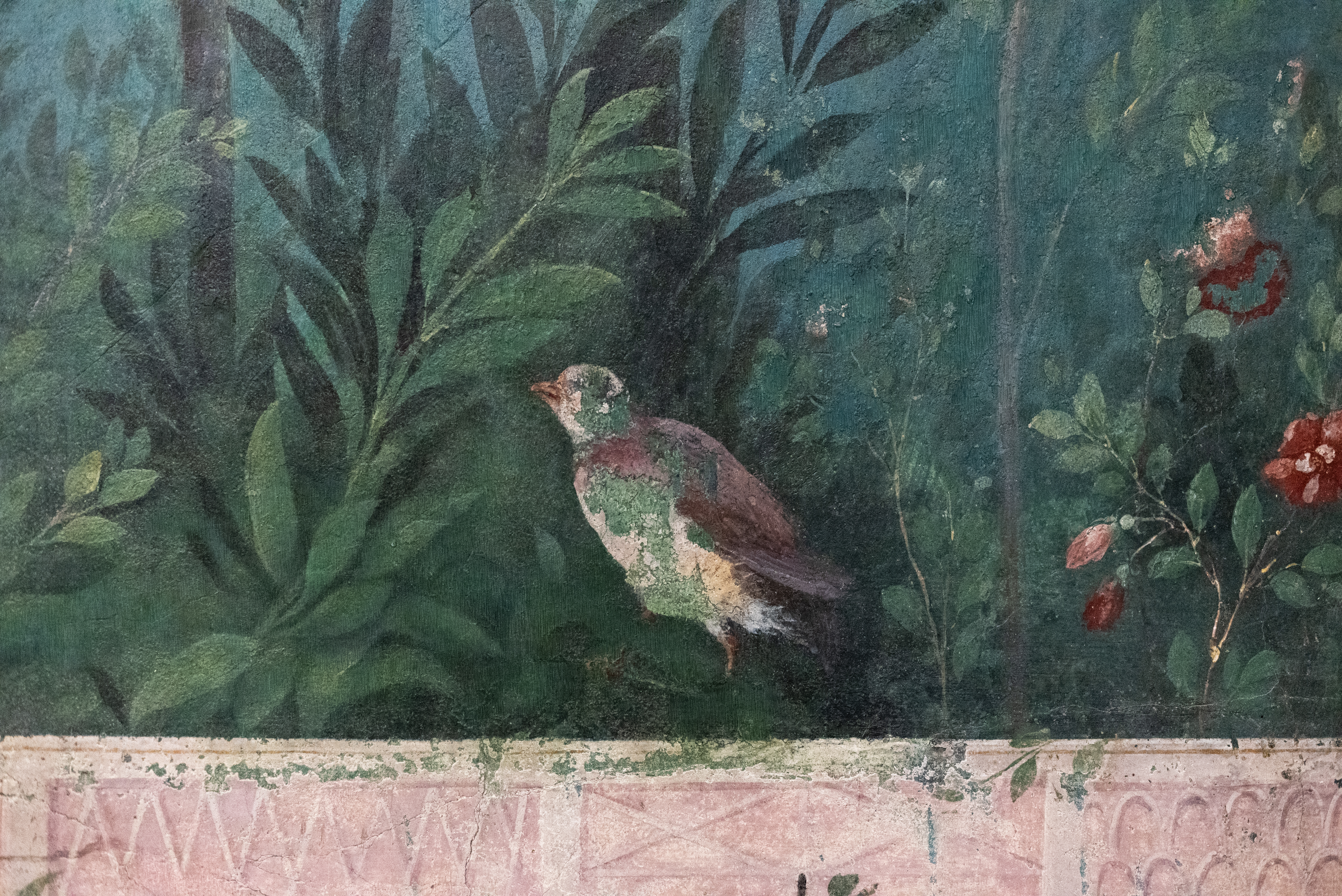

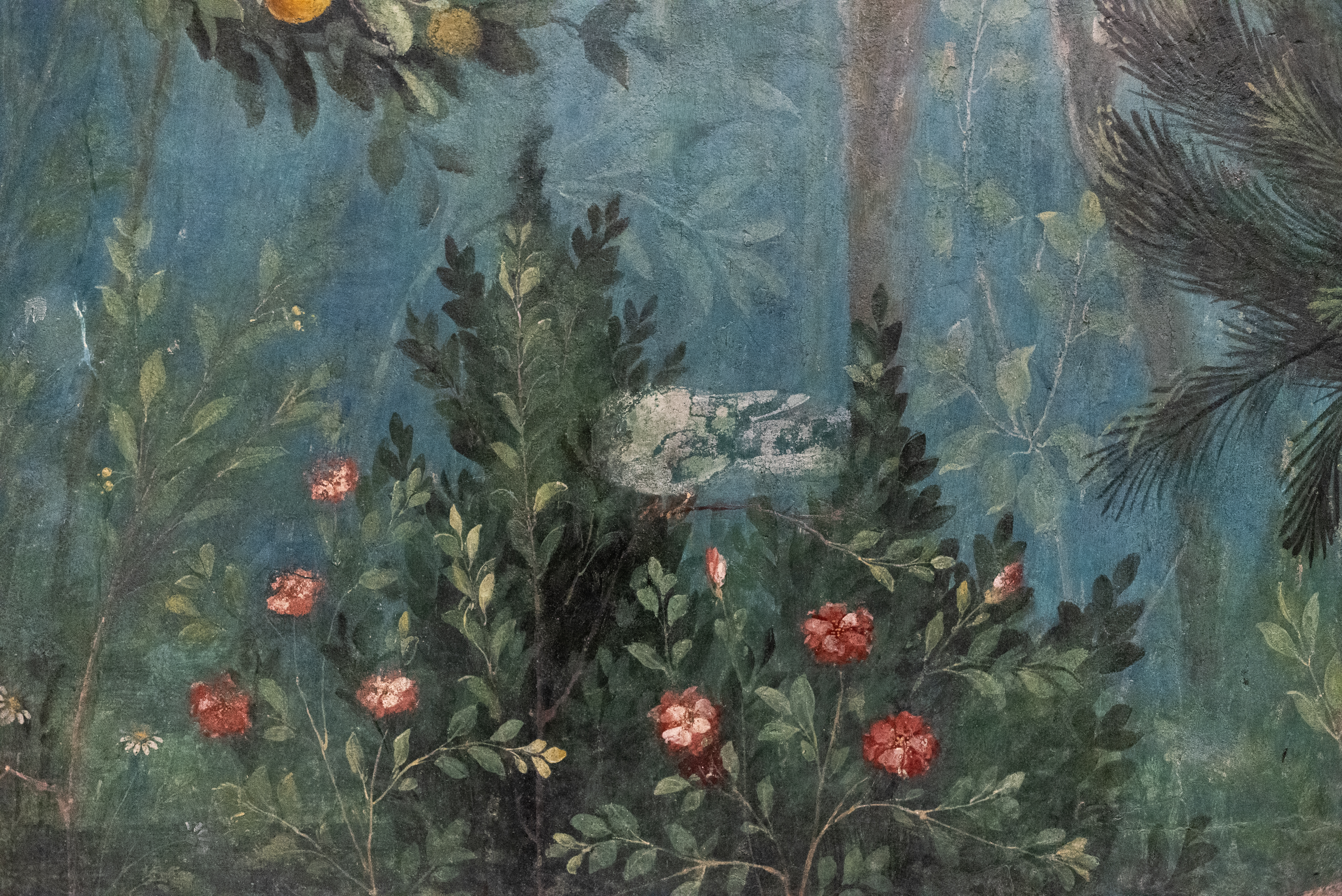

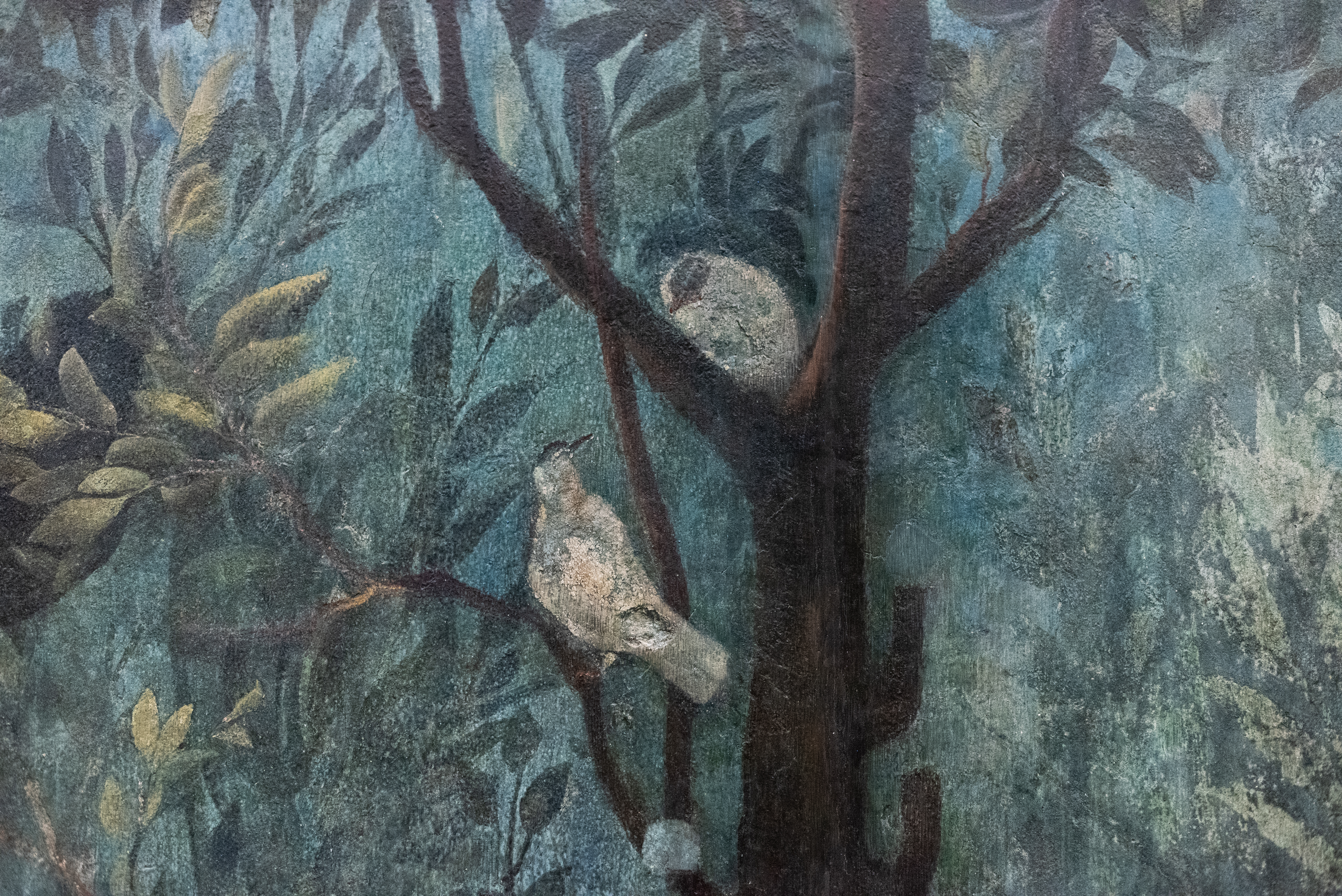

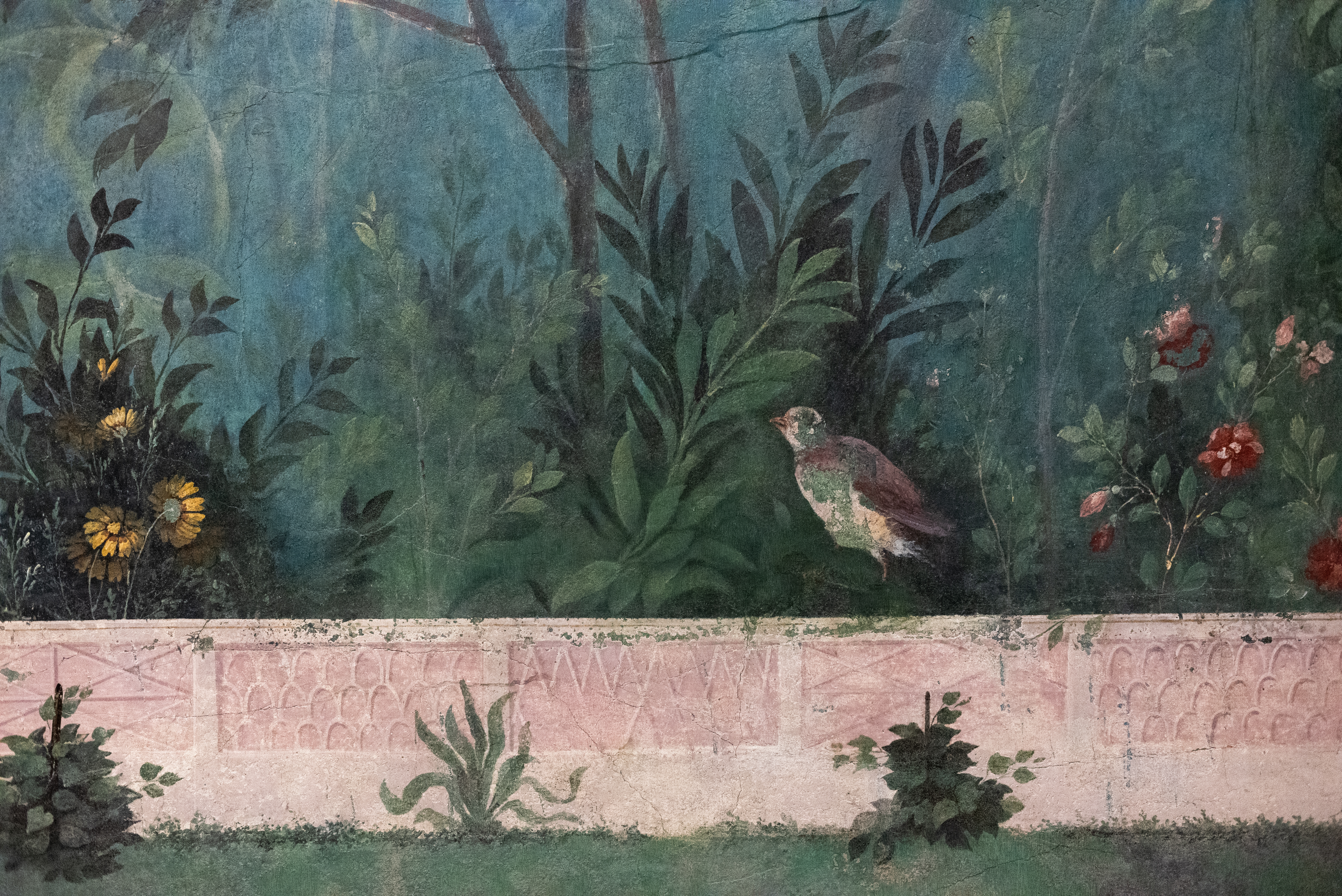

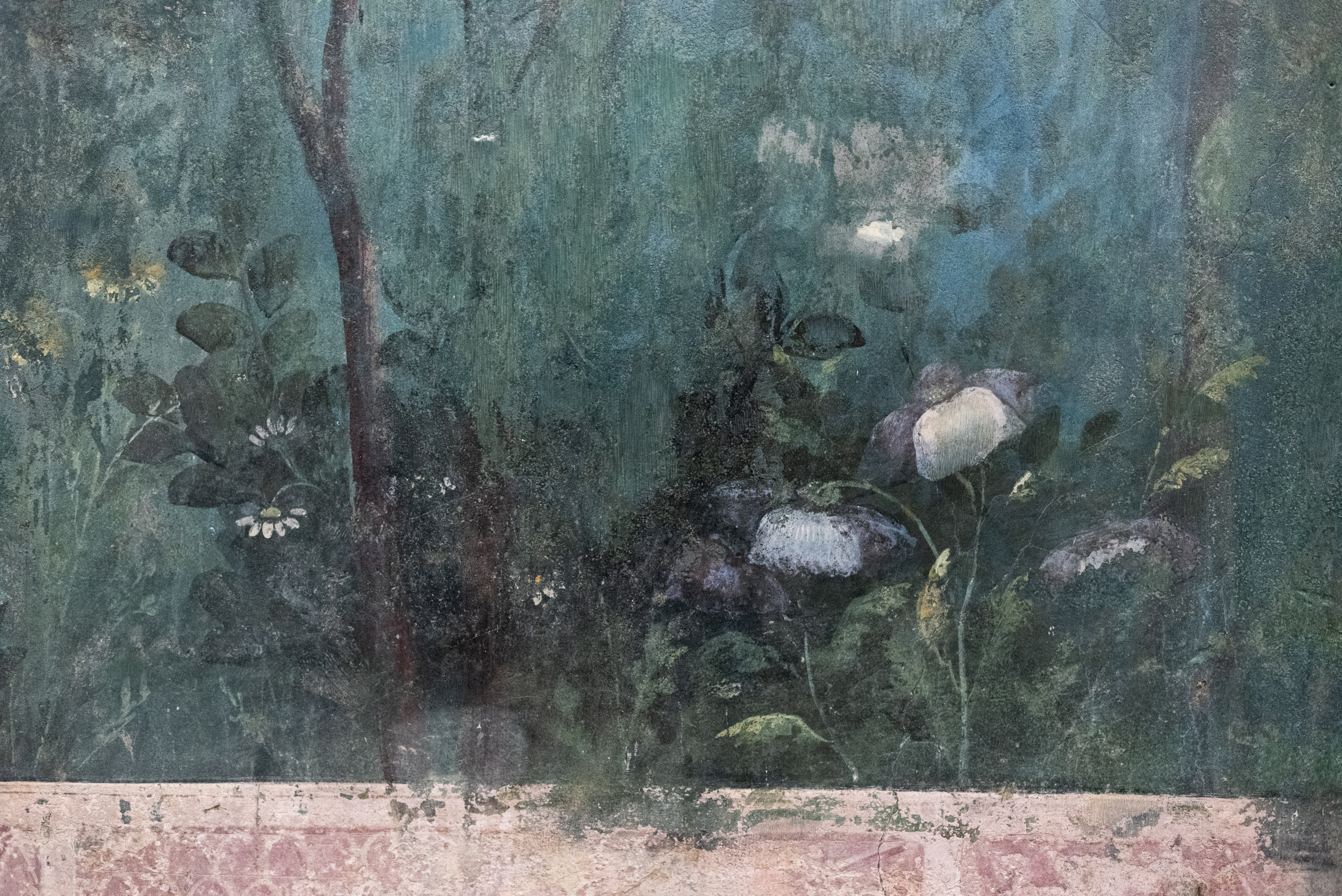

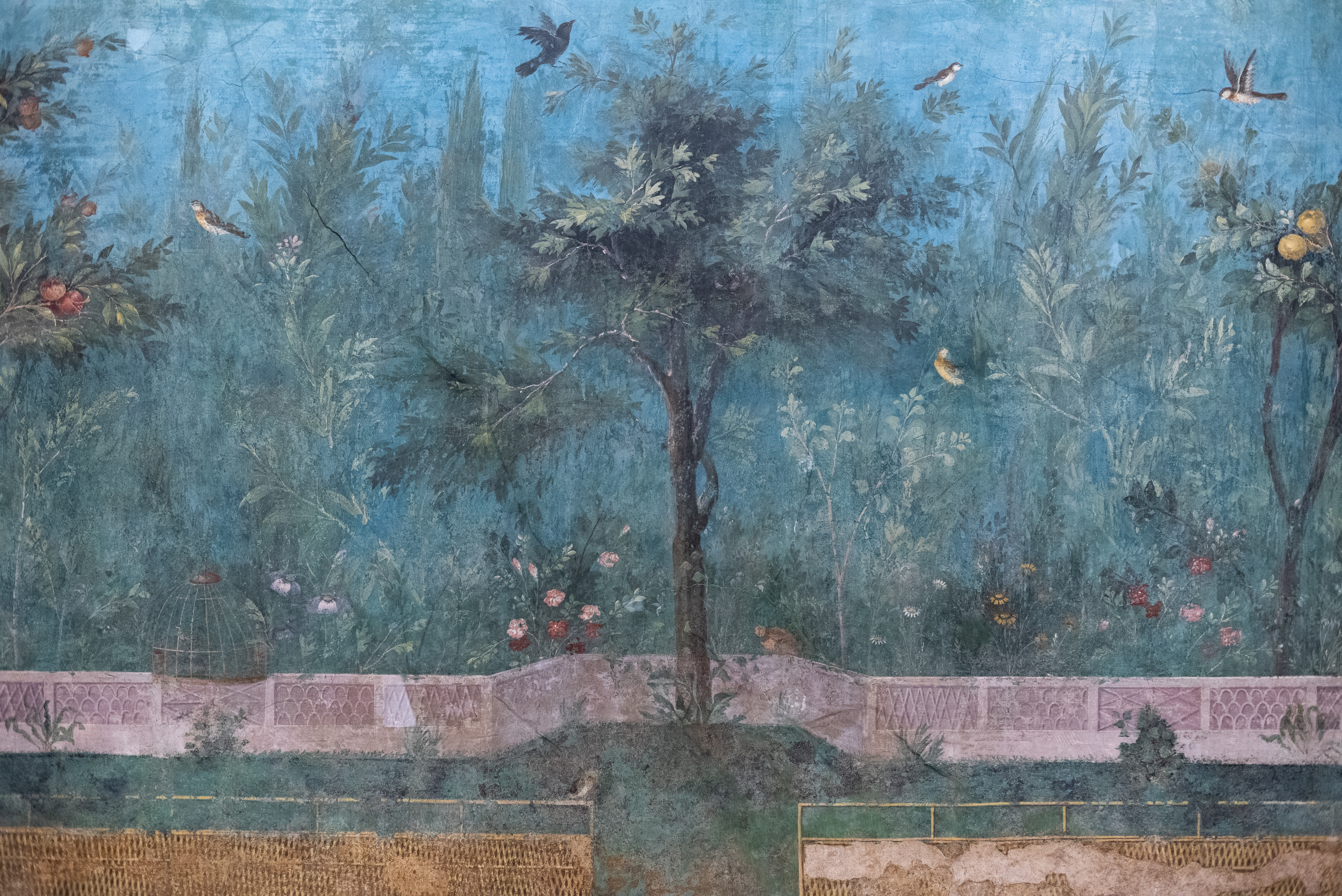

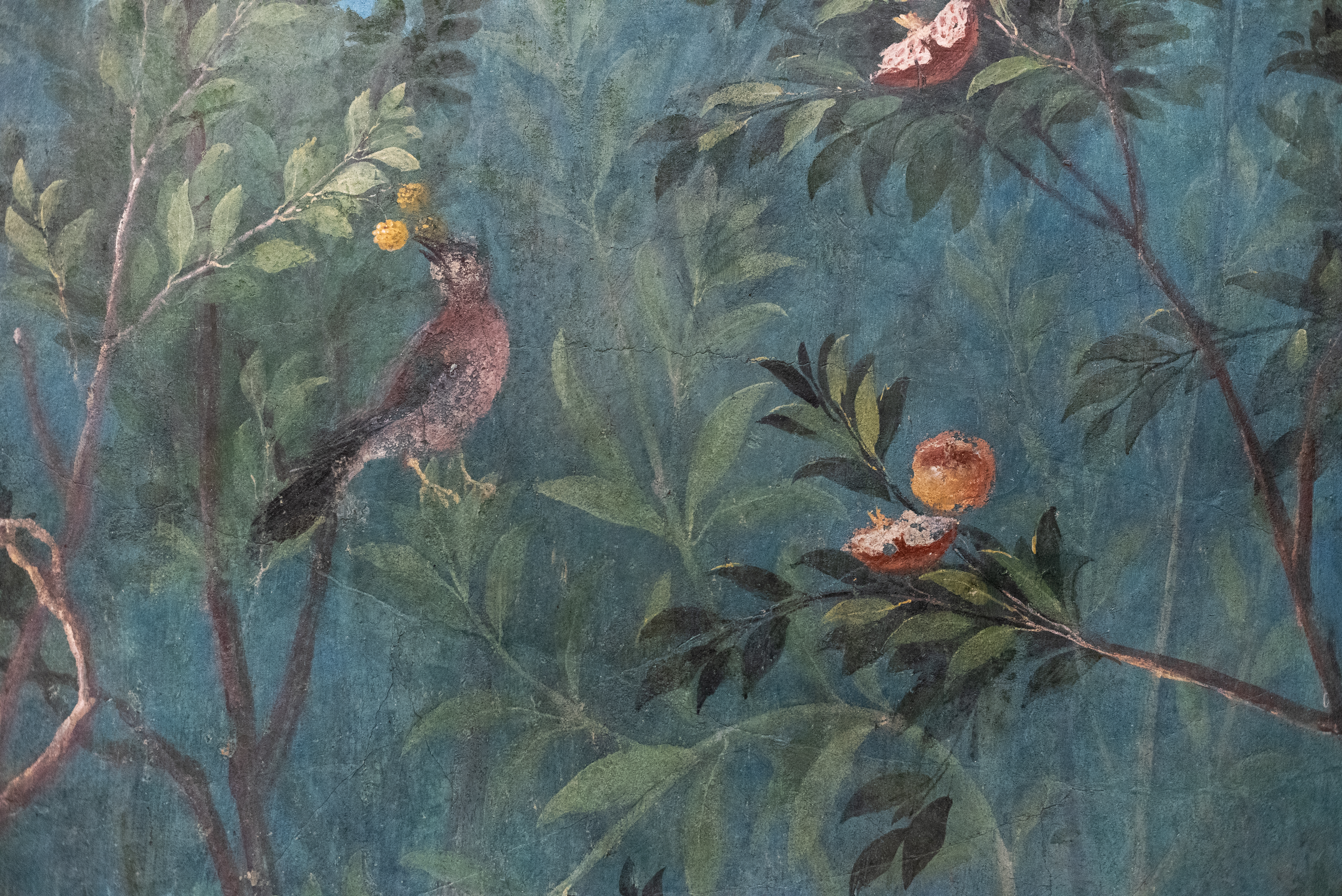

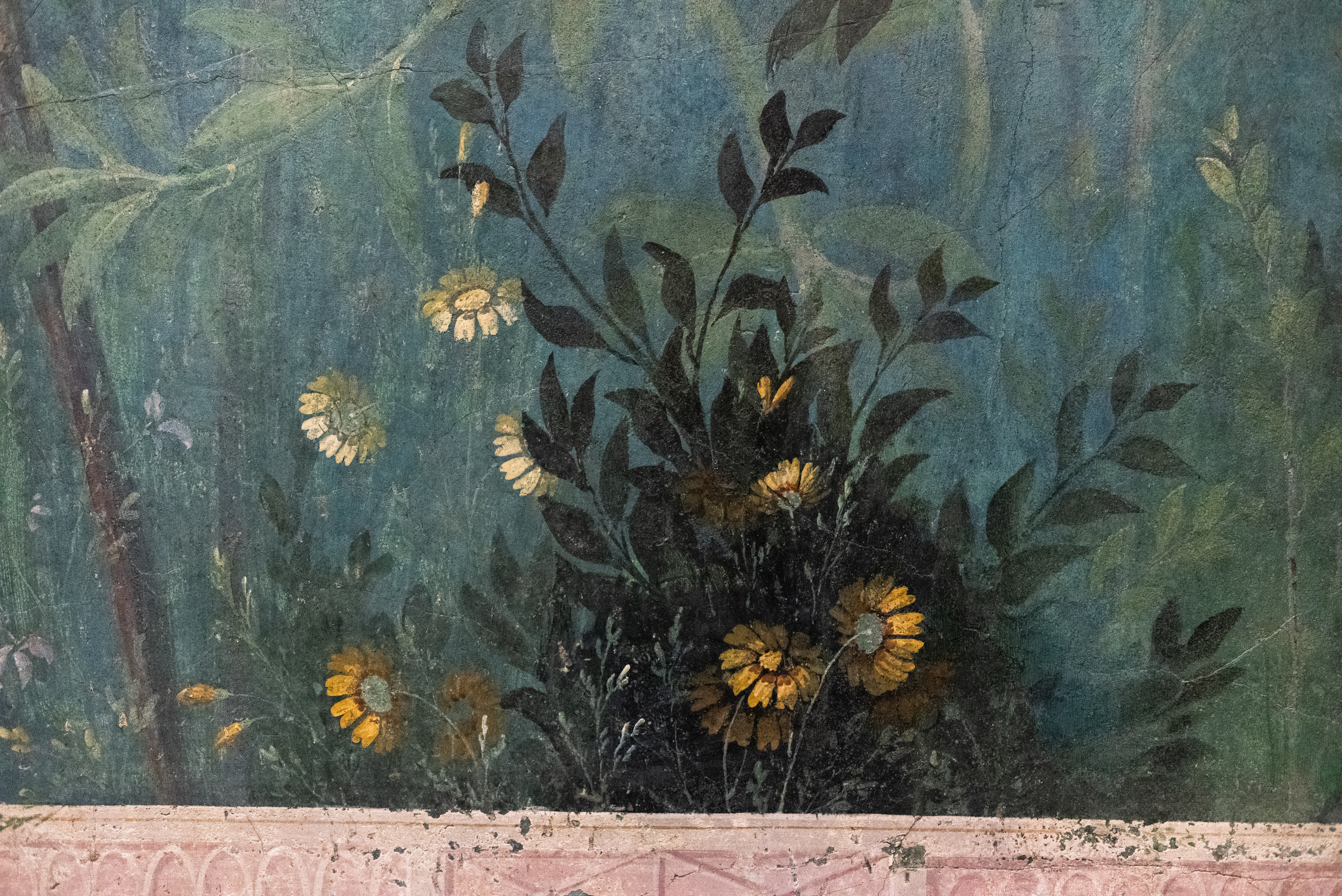

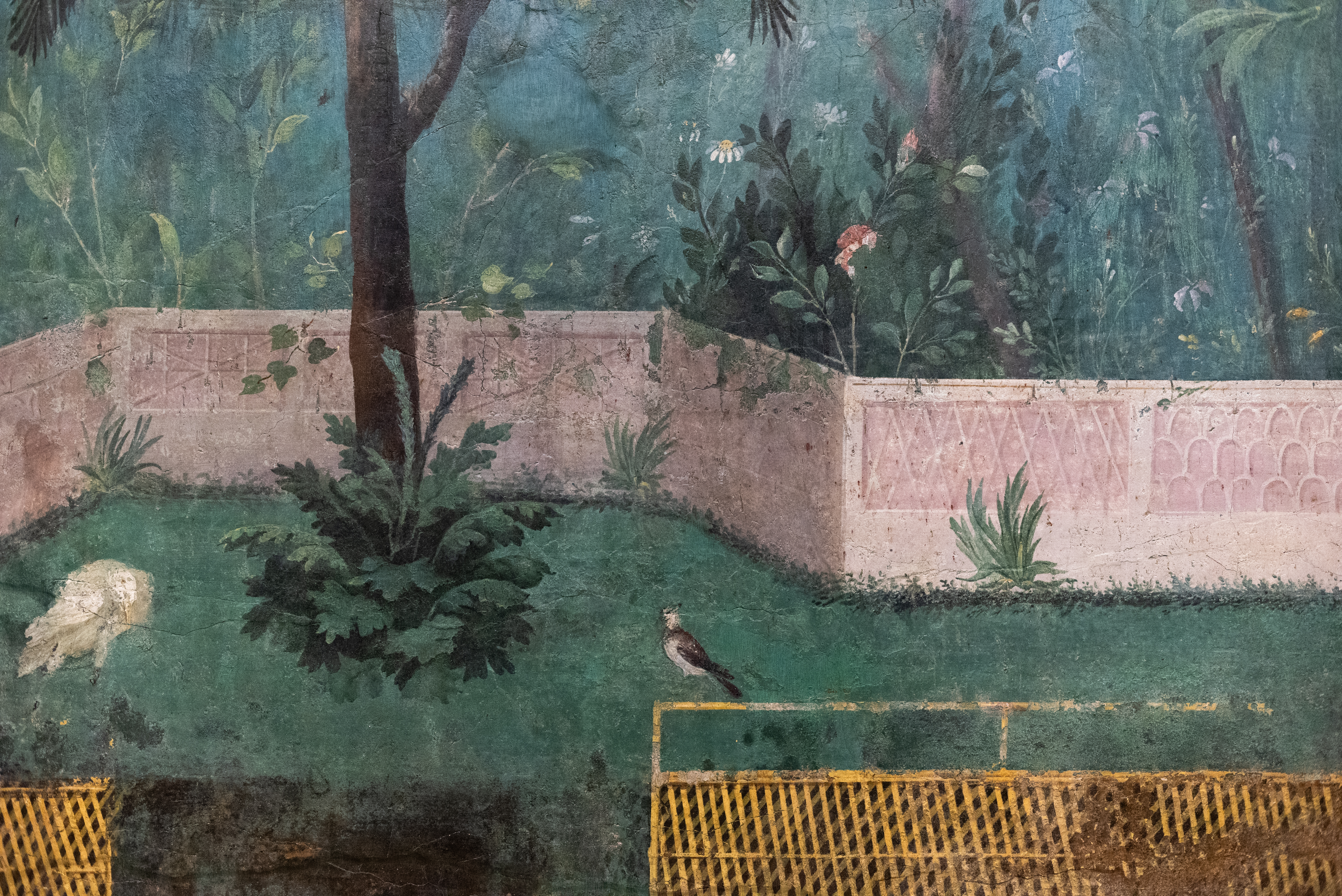

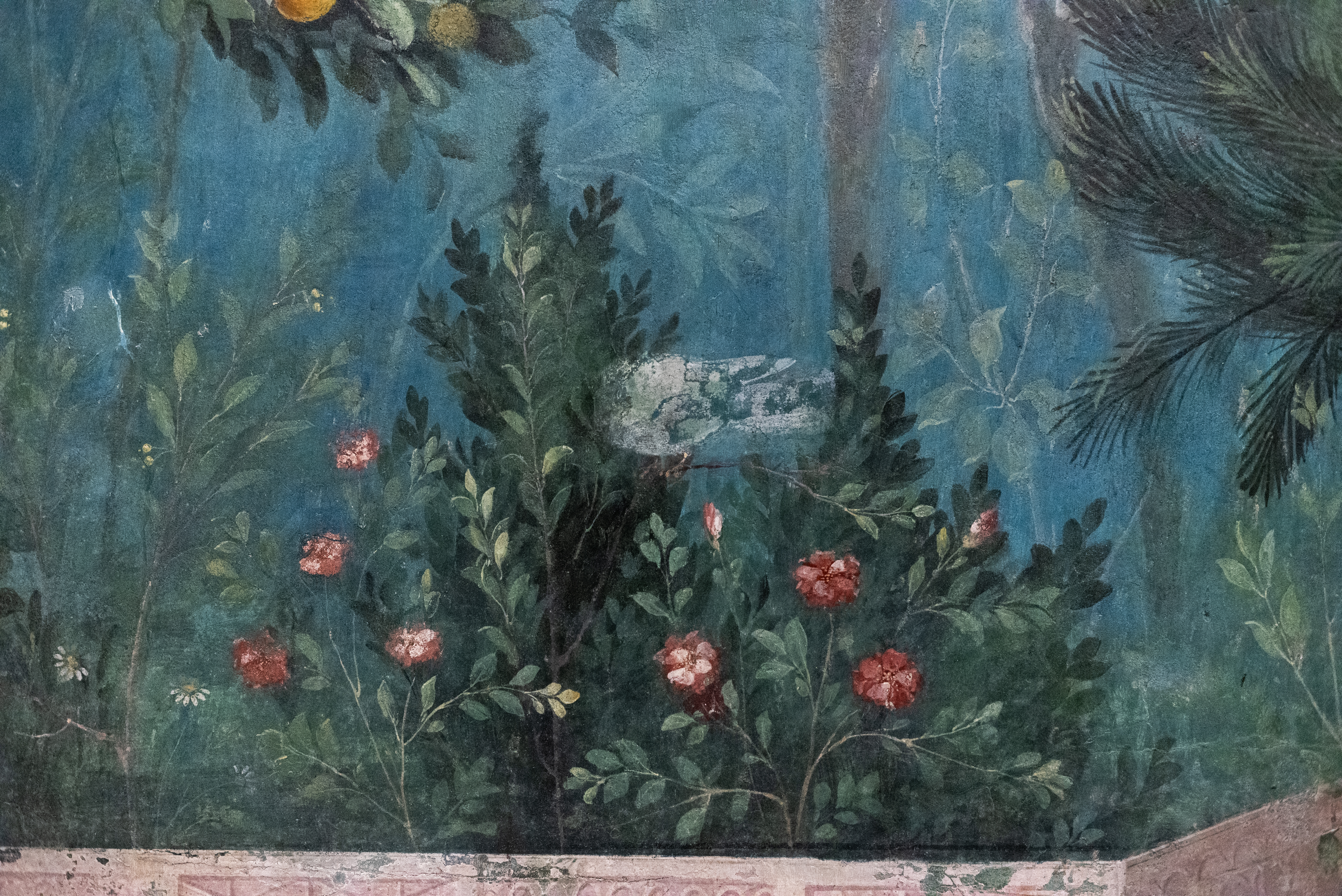

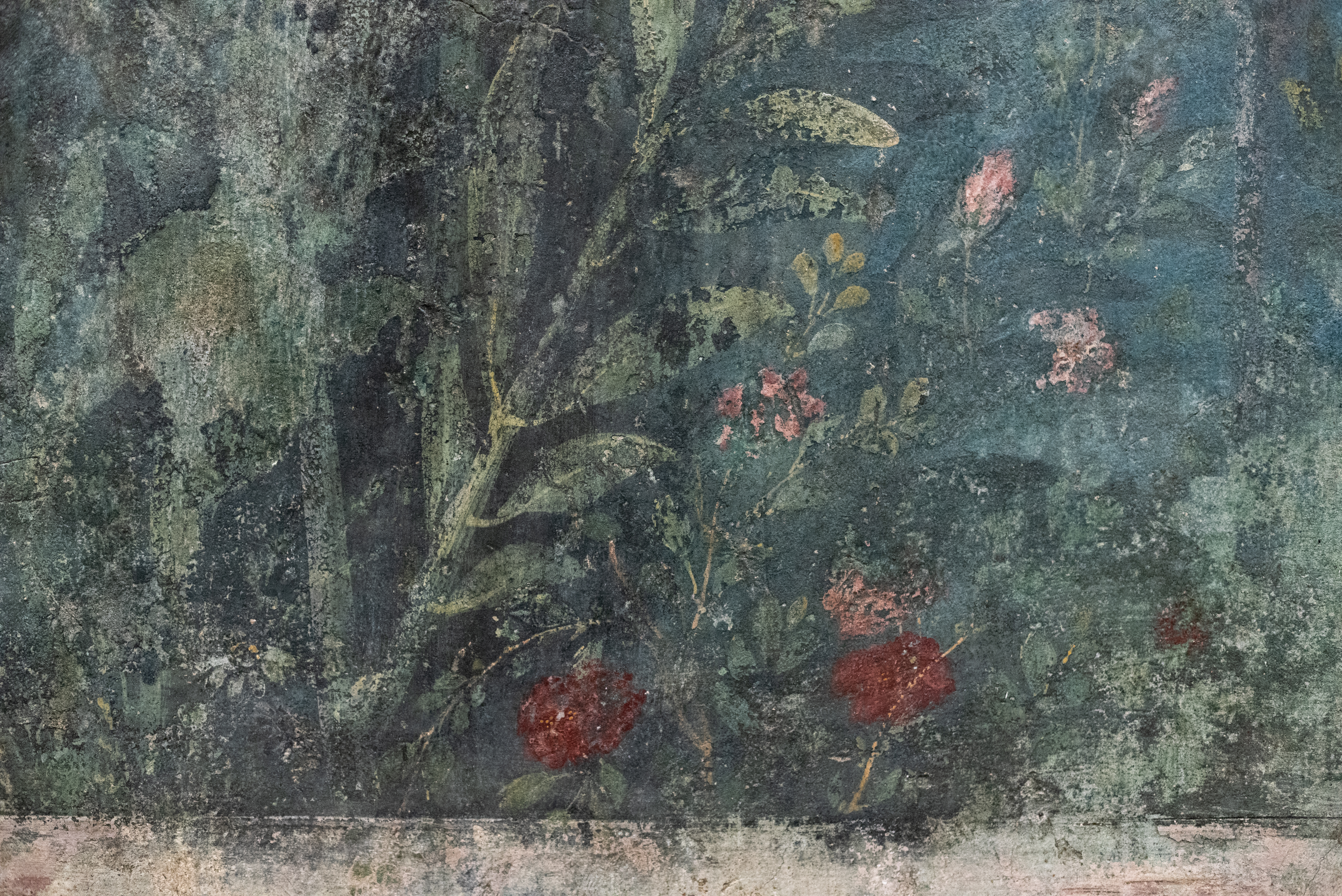

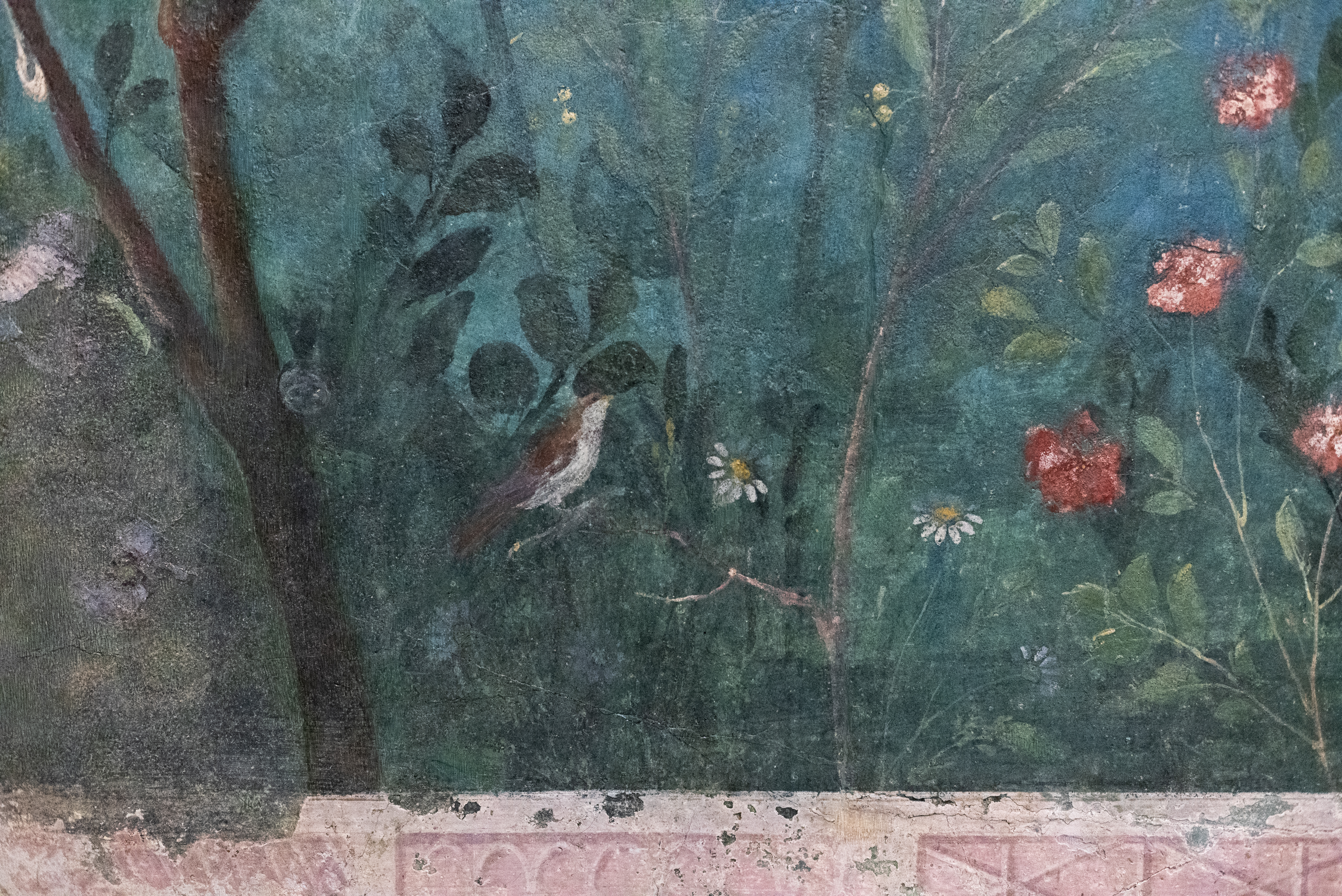

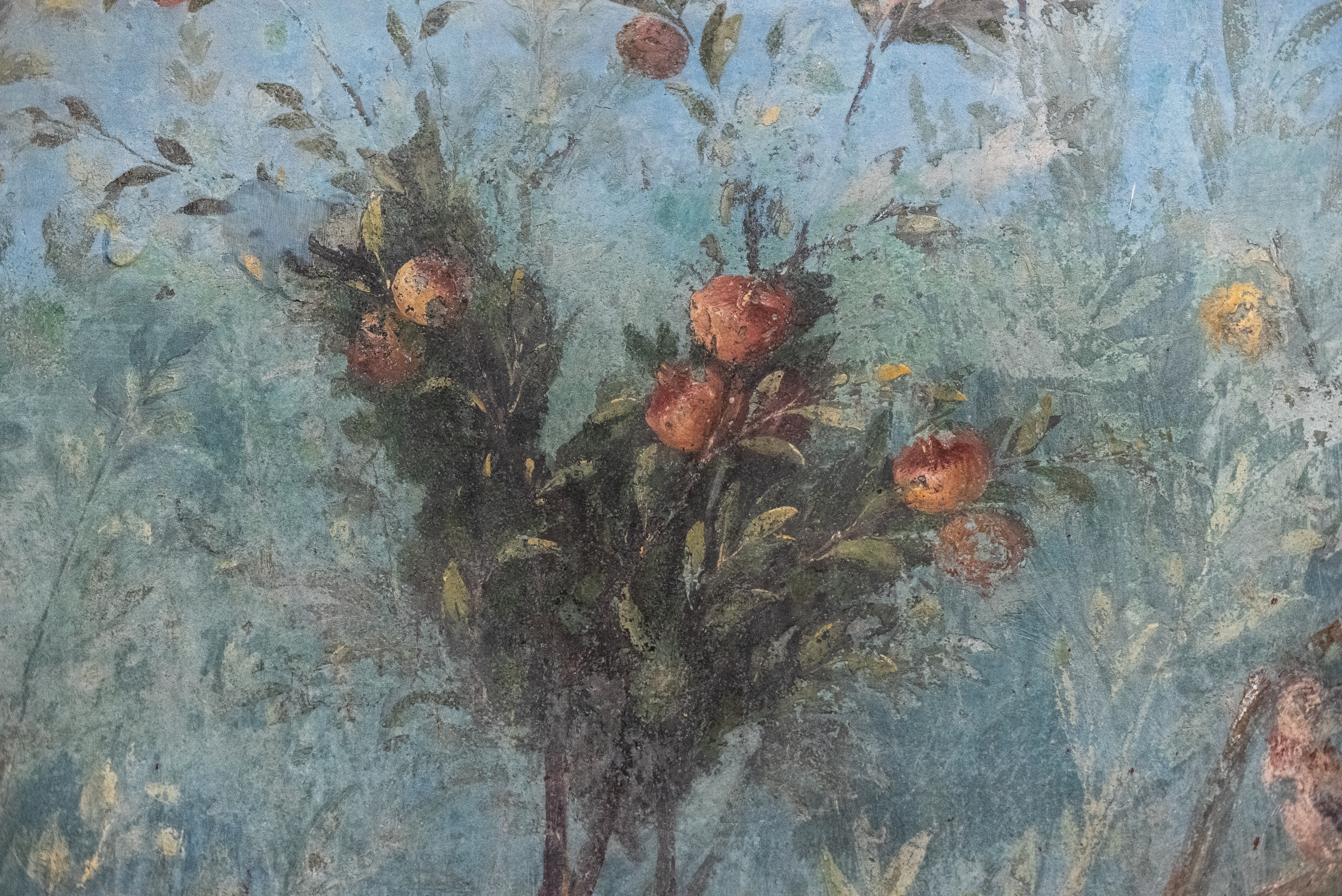

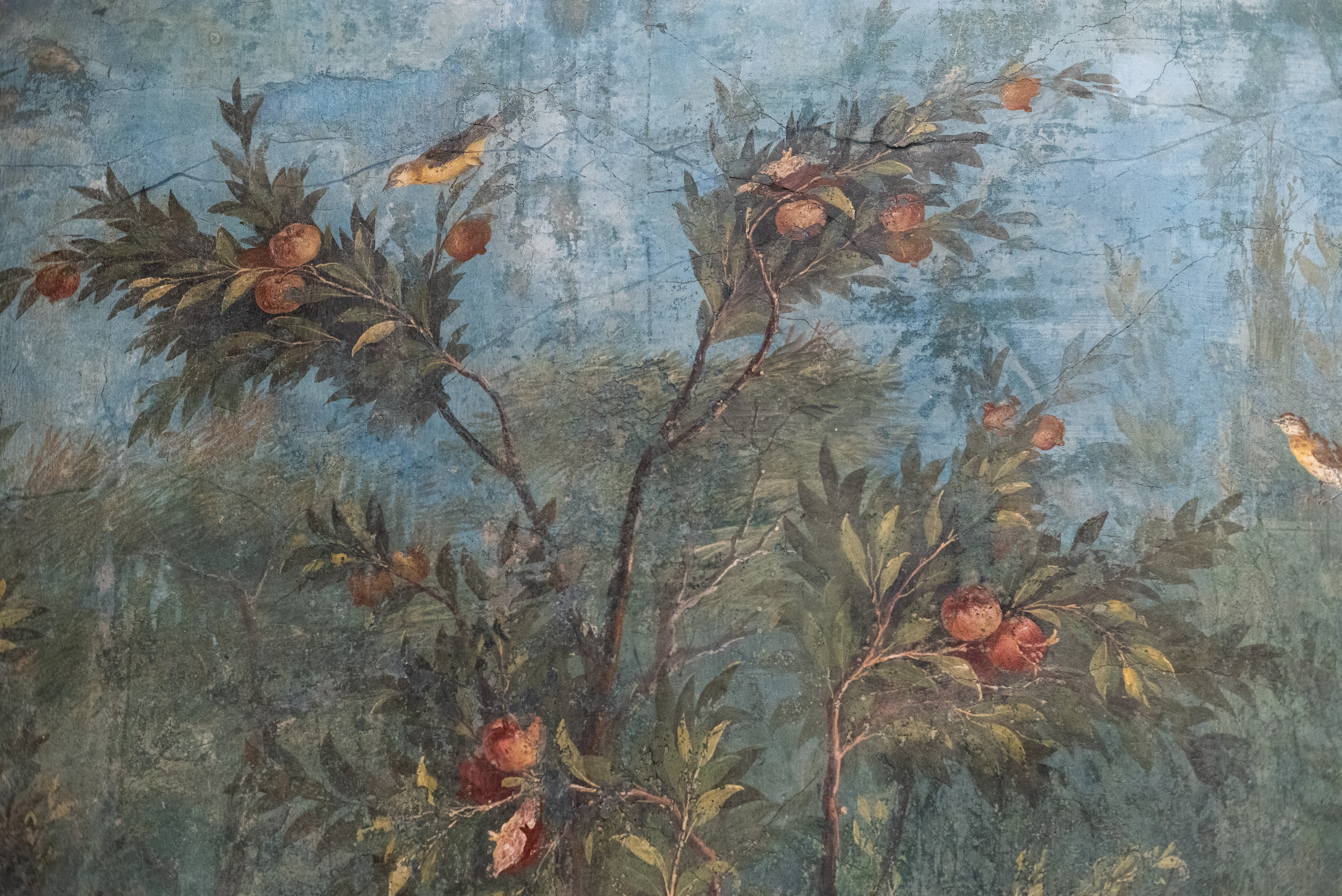

== Further Readings ==
- Carrara, M. (2005). "La Villa di Livia a Prima Porta da praedium suburbanum a villa Caesarum". In B. Santillo Frizell and A. Klynne (ed.). Roman Villas Around The Urbs: interaction with landscape and environment. Proceedings of a Conference at the Swedish Institute in Rome, September 17-18, 2004. Rome.
- M. Carrara, 'ad Gallinas Albas', in Lexicon Topographicum Urbis Romae: Suburbium, vol. III (2005. Rome), p. 17-24
- Jane Clark Reeder, 2001. The Villa of Livia Ad Gallinas Albas. A Study in the Augustan Villa and Garden. in series Archaeologica Transatlantica XX. (Providence: Center for Old World Archaeology and Art) (Bryn Mawr Classical Review 20)
- Calci, C.; G. Messineo (1984). "La Villa di Livia a Prima Porta". Lavori e studi di archeologia. 2.
- Allan Klynne and Peter Liljenstolpe. "Where to Put Augustus?: A Note on the Placement of the Prima Porta Statue." American Journal of Philology 121.1 (2000) pp. 121–128.
- Giesecke, Annette Lucia (2001). "Beyond the Garden of Epicurus: The Utopics of the Ideal Roman Villa". Utopian Studies: 13–32.
- Gabriel, Mabel McAfee (1955). Livia's Garden Room at Prima Porta. New York: New York University Press.
- Evans, Rhiannon (2003). "Searching for Paradise: Landscape, Utopia, and Rome". Arethusa. 36 (3): 285–307. doi:10.1353/are.2003.0022. S2CID 161576098.
- Castaldi, Giusto, Martina, Agostina Maria (July 2024). "The Drawn Garden: Historical, Iconographical and Representative Analysis through Time of the "Villa Di Livia" in Rome" (PDF). Athens Journal of Architecture. 10 (3): 279–310.
- Cole, Marianne (2017). "Secret Gardens: The Garden Room of the Villa of Livia Ad Galinas Albas at Prima Porta". The Department of Art History and Communications Studies McGill University, Montreal.

Preceded by Villa Gordiani	Landmarks of Rome; Villa of Livia	Succeeded by Insula dell'Ara Coeli
