= Insula (building) =

Ancient Roman apartment buildings

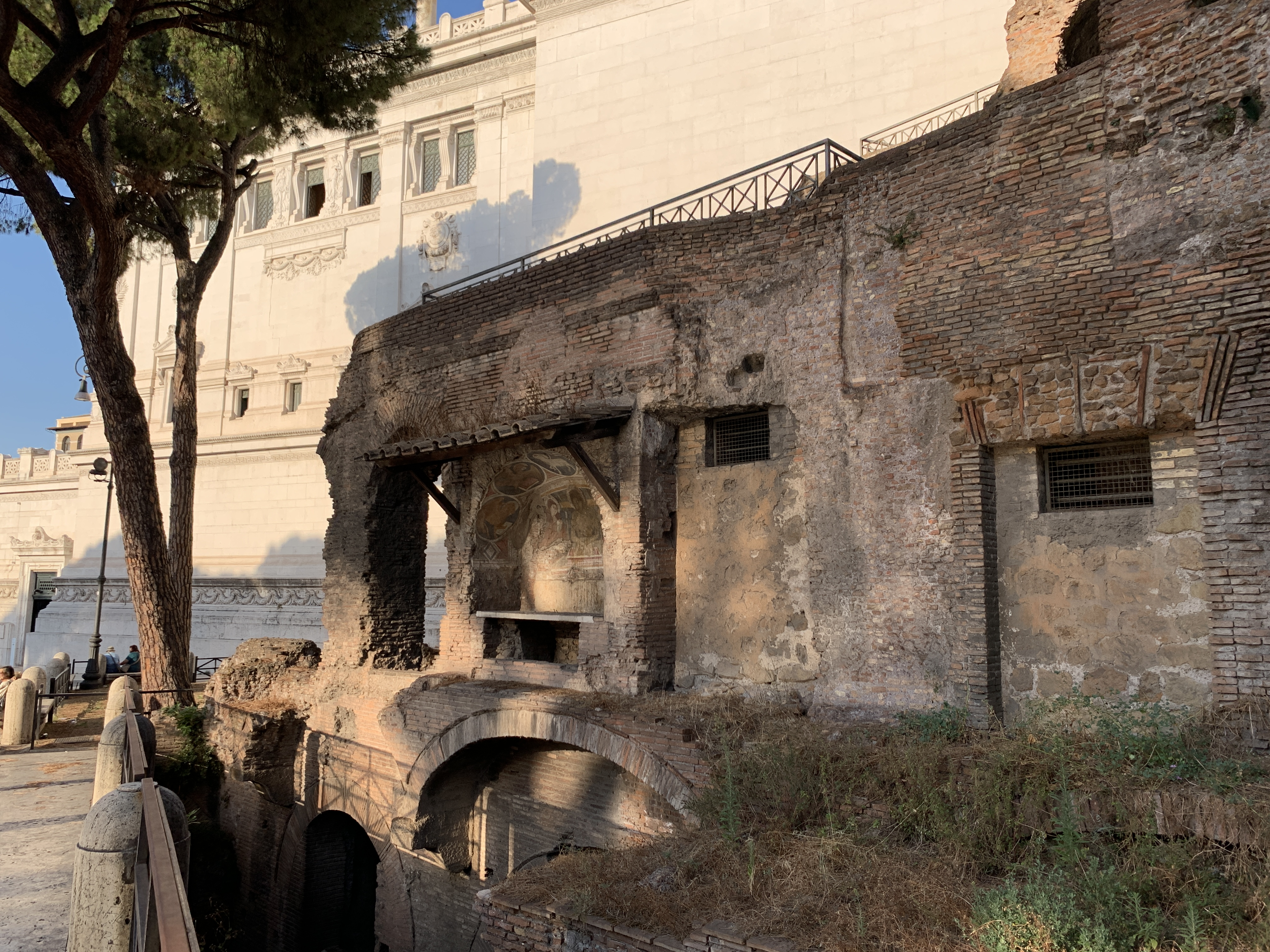
Remains of the top floors of an insula near the Capitolium and the Insula dell'Ara Coeli in Rome

In Roman architecture, an insula (Latin for "island", pl.: insulae) was one of two things: either a kind of apartment building, or a city block. This article deals with the former definition, that of a type of apartment building.

Insulae housed most of the urban citizen population of ancient Rome's massive population ranging from 800,000 to 1 million inhabitants in the early imperial period. Residents of an insula included ordinary people of lower- or middle-class status (the plebeians) and all but the wealthiest from the upper-middle class (the equites).

The traditional elite and the very wealthy lived in a domus, a large single-family residence, but the two kinds of housing were intermingled in the city and not segregated into separate neighbourhoods. The ground-level floor of the insula was used for tabernae, shops and businesses, with living spaces above. Like modern apartment buildings, an insula might have a name, usually referring to the owner of the building. The owners of these buildings were typically wealthy Romans, often senators and those of similar rank. It was also possible for an insula to be owned by several people, such as Cicero, who owned a one-eighth share of an insula and presumably took in one-eighth of its revenue. The inhabitants of the insula paid rent to secure their accommodation.

== Construction ==
Strabo notes that insulae, like domūs, had running water and sanitation, but this type of housing was sometimes constructed at minimal expense for speculative purposes, resulting in insulae of poor construction. They were built in timber, brick, and later Roman concrete, and were prone to fire and collapse, as described by Juvenal, the Roman satirist. Among his many business interests, Marcus Licinius Crassus speculated in real estate and owned numerous insulae in the city. When one collapsed from poor construction, Cicero purportedly stated that he was happy that he could charge higher rents for a new building than the collapsed one. Living quarters were typically the smallest in the building's uppermost floors, with the largest and most expensive apartments being located on the bottom floors.

The insulae could be built up to nine storeys, before Augustus introduced a height limit of about 70 Roman feet (20.7 m). Later, this was reduced further, to about 60 Roman feet (17.75 m). The notably large Insula Felicles or Felicula was located near the Circus Flaminius in Regio IX; the early Christian writer Tertullian condemns the hubris of multiple-story buildings by comparing the Felicles to the towering homes of the gods. It is posited that a typical insula would accommodate over 40 people in only 3,600 sq ft (330 m^{2}); however, an entire structure could comprise about six to seven apartments, each covering about 1,000 sq ft (93 m^{2}) in floor area. The only surviving insula in Rome is the five-storey Insula dell'Ara Coeli dating from the 2nd century AD, which is found at the foot of the Capitoline Hill.

Because of safety issues and extra flights of stairs, the uppermost floors of insulae were the least desirable, and thus the cheapest to rent.

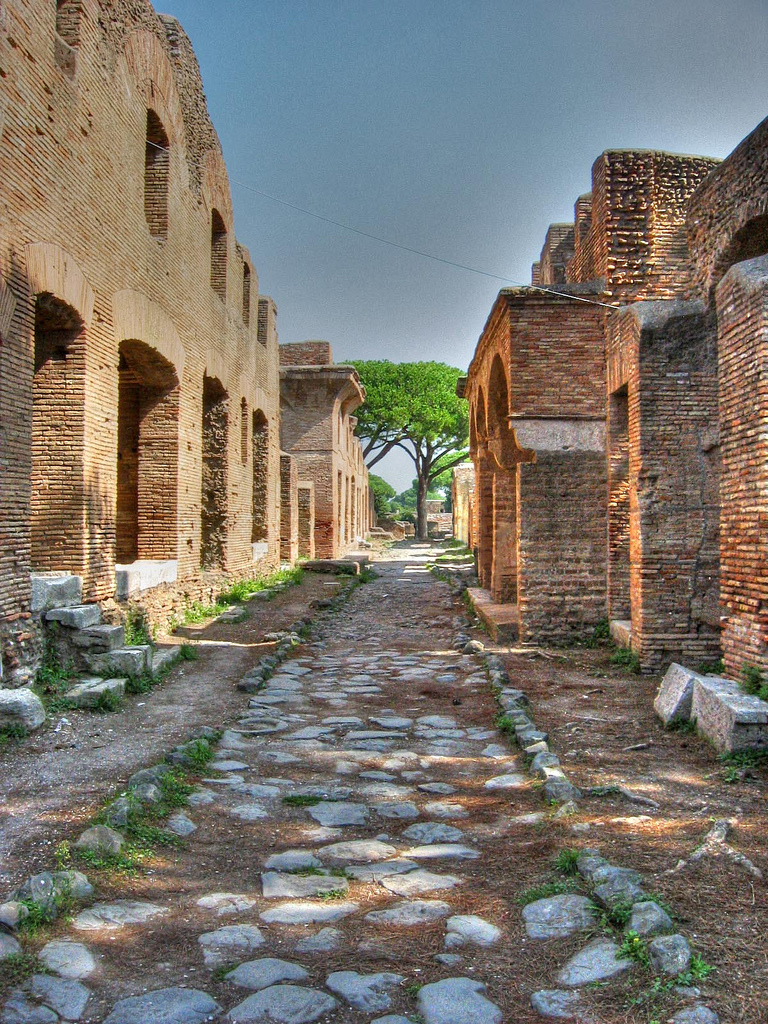
An insula dating from the early 2nd century AD in the Roman port town of Ostia Antica

Other examples outside of Rome are the insulae at Ostia Antica. They provide an insight into what an insula may have been like during the second and third centuries AD. These particular structures at Ostia are also unique in that they show evidence of luxurious insulae. Due to the rarity of evidence today it is uncertain as to how common these luxury insulae were. The floor plan allows one to determine what constitutes one of these luxury insulae. Firstly, there is a rectangular living space called a medianum from which all the other rooms can be accessed. These attached reception rooms were different sizes at either end and were typically partitioned further into two separate rooms but sometimes remained each as one. Large glazed windows allowed light into these rooms. These windows would often overlook a garden, courtyard or the street. On the adjacent sides of the medianum were the cubicula, usually two of them. Larger insulae at Ostia suggest that the upper floors could have had kitchens, latrines, and even piped water. Further luxurious features seen in Ostia include ornate pilasters or columns decorating exterior doors to staircases leading up to the apartments. The decorations suggest that these particular insulae probably housed wealthy individuals who lived there on a long-term basis.

Simple two to four-roomed apartments are also found in Ostia for the lower classes inhabiting an insula. As seen in the Casa di Diana, the ground floor contains a narrow corridor with several poorly-lit cells that lead to what is believed to be a shared living area. This type of insula can also be found at the Capitoline Hill in Rome which may suggest that this particular design could have been a common solution to high housing demand at the time. The latrine and cistern for drinking water also seem to be shared. This shared accommodation type meant for the lower classes was likely rented both by short-term inhabitants and also acted as an inn for short-tenure or itinerant workers. However, this is merely conjecture as there is no direct evidence to support whether they were shared, nor how many inhabited the space at a given time.

== Regulation and administration ==
Augustus instituted reforms aimed at increasing the safety of buildings in the city of Rome. Because of the dangers of fire and collapse, the height of the insulae were restricted by Augustus to 70 pedes (Roman feet, 20.7 m), and again to an unspecified amount by Emperor Nero after The Great Fire of Rome in 64 AD. Emperor Trajan reduced the height to 60 Roman feet (17.75 m). According to the 4th-century Regionary catalogues, there were about 42,000–46,000 insulae in the city, as compared to about 1,790 domus in the late 3rd century. Data on the number of insulae and to a lesser extent domus are used for classical demography. The city's population in the late 3rd century is thought to have fluctuated between 700,000 and 800,000, down from more than 1 million, based also on figures for the amount of grain required to feed the population in Rome and surrounding areas.
