= Augustus of Prima Porta =

Ancient Roman sculpture of Augustus

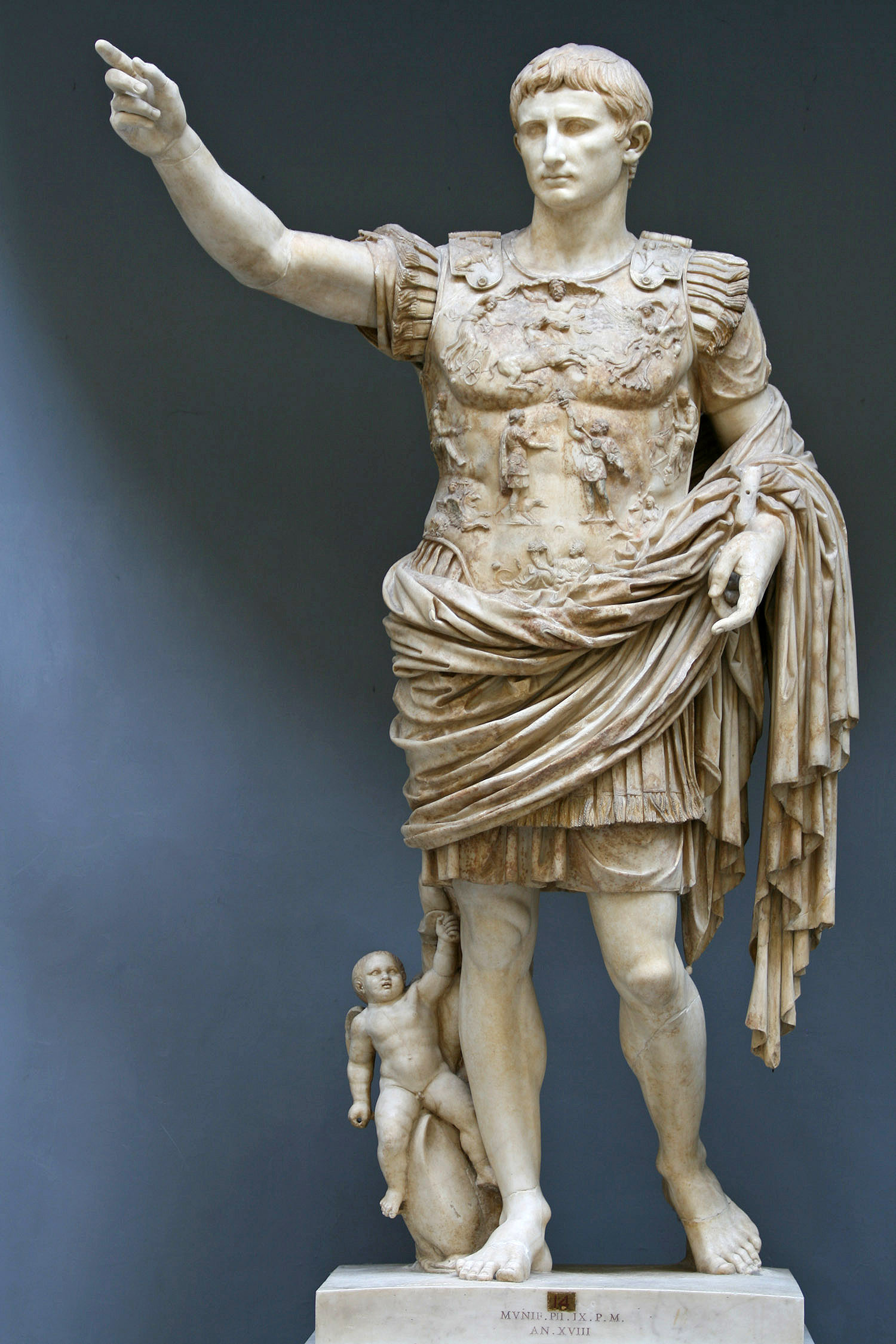
- Augustus of Prima Porta
- Click on the map for a fullscreen view
- Artist: Unknown
- Year: 1st century AD
- Type: White marble
- Location: Vatican Museums, Vatican City; 41°54′23″N 12°27′16″E

The Augustus of Prima Porta (Italian: Augusto di Prima Porta) is a full-length portrait statue of Augustus, the first Roman emperor.

The statue was discovered on April 20, 1863, during archaeological excavations directed by Giuseppe Gagliardi at the Villa of Livia owned by Augustus's third and final wife, Livia Drusilla in Prima Porta. Livia had retired to the villa after Augustus's death in AD 14. Its discovery was first publicized by the German archaeologist Wilhelm Henzen the same year.

The marble statue was carved in the 1st century AD by skilled sculptors who may have been Greek, although this is not certain. The piece is generally believed to be a copy of a lost bronze original displayed in Rome. It blends Greek and Roman elements to craft an idealized official image of Augustus, showcasing his grasp of visual influence. While the head portrays a realistic youthful Augustus, the body diverges from reality; despite its clothed form, the body's stance reflects the heroic stance found in Greek statues. The detailed armor, depicting a Parthian returning standards to a Roman, symbolizes peace along the eastern frontier of the Roman Empire. The statue stands 2.08 metres (6 ft 10 in) tall and weighs 1,000 kilograms (2,200 lb).

The Augustus of Prima Porta is now displayed in the Braccio Nuovo (New Arm) of the Vatican Museums. Since its discovery, it has become the best known of Augustus's portraits and one of the most famous sculptures of the ancient world.

== Original ==
The intricate imagery on the lorica musculata (typical of legates) refers to the Parthian Empire’s restitution of Roman eagle insignia, which had previously been captured from Marcus Licinius Crassus, to Augustus in 20 BC, one of his most significant diplomatic accomplishments. The date of the (hypothetical) bronze original is therefore later than 20 BC. The event detailed on the armor symbolizes the Pax Romana initiated by Rome’s first Emperor. The fact that Augustus is depicted barefooted is intended to be a divine representation, as this was a standard depiction of gods or heroes in classical iconography. The date of the marble copy would presumably fall between that date and Livia's death in AD 29.

The statue might have been commissioned by Tiberius, the successor to Augustus, possibly as a gift to his mother Livia (since it was found in her Villa ad Gallinas Albas in the vicinity of the ninth mile-marker of the Via Flaminia, and close to a late imperial gate and aqueduct called Prima Porta) after Augustus' death and in honor of the woman who had campaigned for so long for him to become the next Caesar. This hypothesis is based on the fact that the central reliefs on the heroic cuirass depict the retrieval of Crassus' standards captured by the Parthians, an event in which the young Tiberius himself served as an intermediary with the Parthian king, and which was possibly his greatest service to his adoptive father Augustus. With the presentation of Tiberius as the figure responsible for the retrieval of the standards in the breastplate’s imagery, he would have associated himself in the minds of viewers with the deified emperor and suggested continuity between their reigns, as Augustus himself had done previously with his own deified adoptive father Julius Caesar (though Caesar was not himself an emperor). Under this hypothesis, the dating of the statue can be placed during the first years of Tiberius' reign as emperor (AD 14 — AD 37). However, it is also possible that it was commissioned by Livia herself, Augustus's wife at the time of his death.

== Style ==
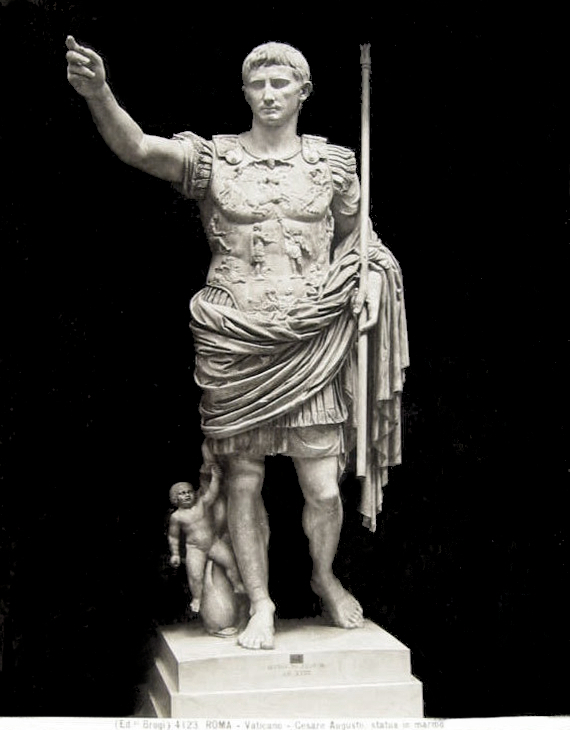
Version of the statue in 1870 with a staff in his left hand

Augustus is shown in his role of imperator, the commander of the army, as thoracatus —or commander-in-chief of the Roman army (literally, thorax-wearer)—meaning the statue should form part of a commemorative monument to his latest victories; he is in military clothing, carrying what may have been a spear or a consular baton, and raising his right hand in a rhetorical adlocutio pose, addressing the troops. The bas-reliefs on his armored cuirass have a complex allegorical and political agenda, alluding to diverse Roman deities, including Mars, god of war, as well as the personifications of the latest territories he conquered: Hispania, Gaul, Germania, Parthia (that had humiliated Crassus, and here appears in the act of returning the standards captured from his legions); at the top, the chariot of the Sun illuminates Augustus's deeds.

The statue is an idealized image of Augustus showing a standard pose of a Roman orator and based on the 5th-century BC statue of the Spear Bearer or Doryphoros by the sculptor Polykleitos. The Doryphoros's contrapposto stance, creating diagonals between tense and relaxed limbs, a feature typical of classical sculpture, is adapted here. The pose of the statue's legs is similar to Doryphoros. The right leg is taut, while the left leg is relaxed, as if the statue is moving forward. The misidentification of the Doryphoros in the Roman period as representing the warrior Achilles made the model all the more appropriate for this image. Despite the Republican influence in the portrait head, the overall style is closer to Hellenistic idealization than to the realism of Roman portraiture. The reason for this style shift is the acquisition of Greek art. Following each conquest, the Romans brought back large amounts of Greek art. This flow of Greek artifacts changed Romans' aesthetic tastes, and these art pieces were regarded as a symbol of wealth and status for the Roman upper class.

Despite the accuracy with which Augustus's features are depicted (with his somber look and characteristic fringe of hair on his forehead), the distant and tranquil expression of his face has been idealized, as have the conventional contrapposto, the anatomical proportions and the deeply draped paludamentum or "cloth of the commander". On the other hand, Augustus's barefootedness and the inclusion of Cupid riding a dolphin as structural support for the statue reveals his mythical connection to the goddess Venus (Cupid's mother) by way of his adopted father Julius Caesar. The clear Greek inspiration in style and symbol for official sculptural portraits, which under the Roman emperors became instruments of governmental propaganda, is a central part of the Augustan ideological campaign, a shift from the Roman Republican era iconography where old and wise features were seen as symbols of solemn character. Therefore, the Prima Porta statue marks a conscious reversal of iconography to the Greek classical and Hellenistic period, in which youth and strength were valued as signs of leadership, emulating heroes and culminating in Alexander the Great himself. Such a statue's political function was very obvious—to show Rome that the emperor Augustus was an exceptional figure, comparable to the heroes worthy of being raised to divine status on Olympus, and the best man to govern Rome.

== Polychromy ==
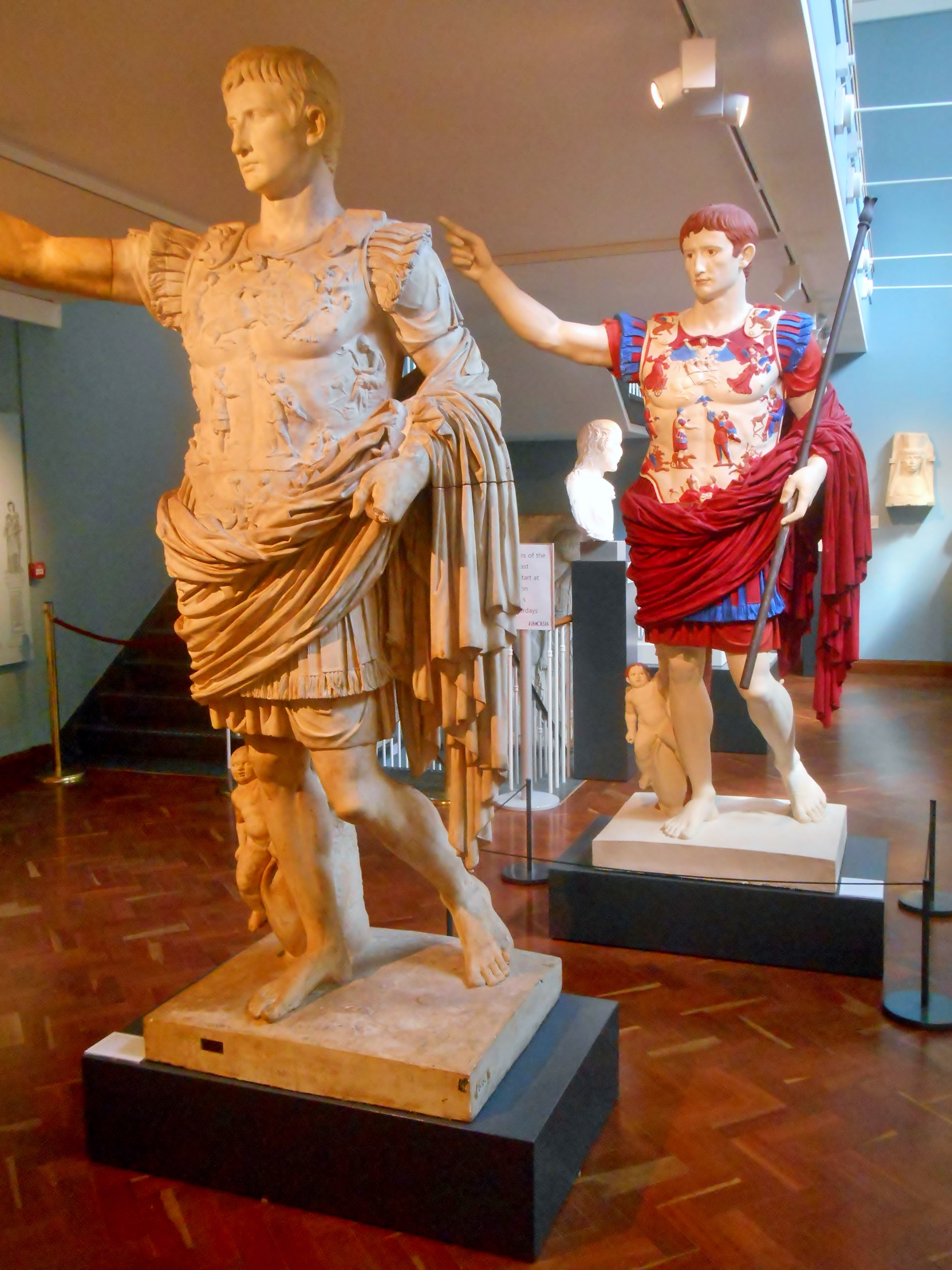
Unpainted and painted replica of the statue (part of the Gods in Colour exhibition)

It is almost certain that the Augustus was originally painted, but so few traces remain today (having been lost in the ground and having faded since discovery) that historians have had to fall back on old watercolors and new scientific investigations for evidence. Vincenz Brinkmann of Munich researched the use of color on ancient sculpture in the 1980s using ultraviolet rays to find traces of color.

Today, the Vatican Museums have produced a copy of the statue so as to paint it in the theorized original colors, as confirmed when the statue was cleaned in 1999. However, an art historian of the University of St Andrews in Scotland, Fabio Barry, has criticized this reconstitution as unsubtle and exaggerated, while other critics have argued that there are many notable differences between the original Prima Porta of Augustus and the painted recreation. However, due to the ongoing disagreement on the statue's pigmentation there is little information on or exploration of the usage of these colors. Another copy was painted with a different color scheme for the Tarraco Viva 2014 Festival.

Since at least the 18th century, the familiar sight of Roman sculptures that lack their original paint has encouraged the idea that monochromy is the natural condition for classical sculpture; but surface treatment is now recognized as integral to the overall effect of the sculpture.

The writings of second-century polymath Lucian provide a good example of how color functioned for a work of that time, "I Fear I stand in the way of her most important feature!... the rest of the body let Apelles represent.. not too white but diffused with blood". The quote continues to state that a statue of the time is unfinished without its "chora"—skin—or layer, applied to the statue to render it complete. The specific implications of each color chosen for the Prima Porta are unknown; assumedly red for the military and royalty.

== Iconography ==
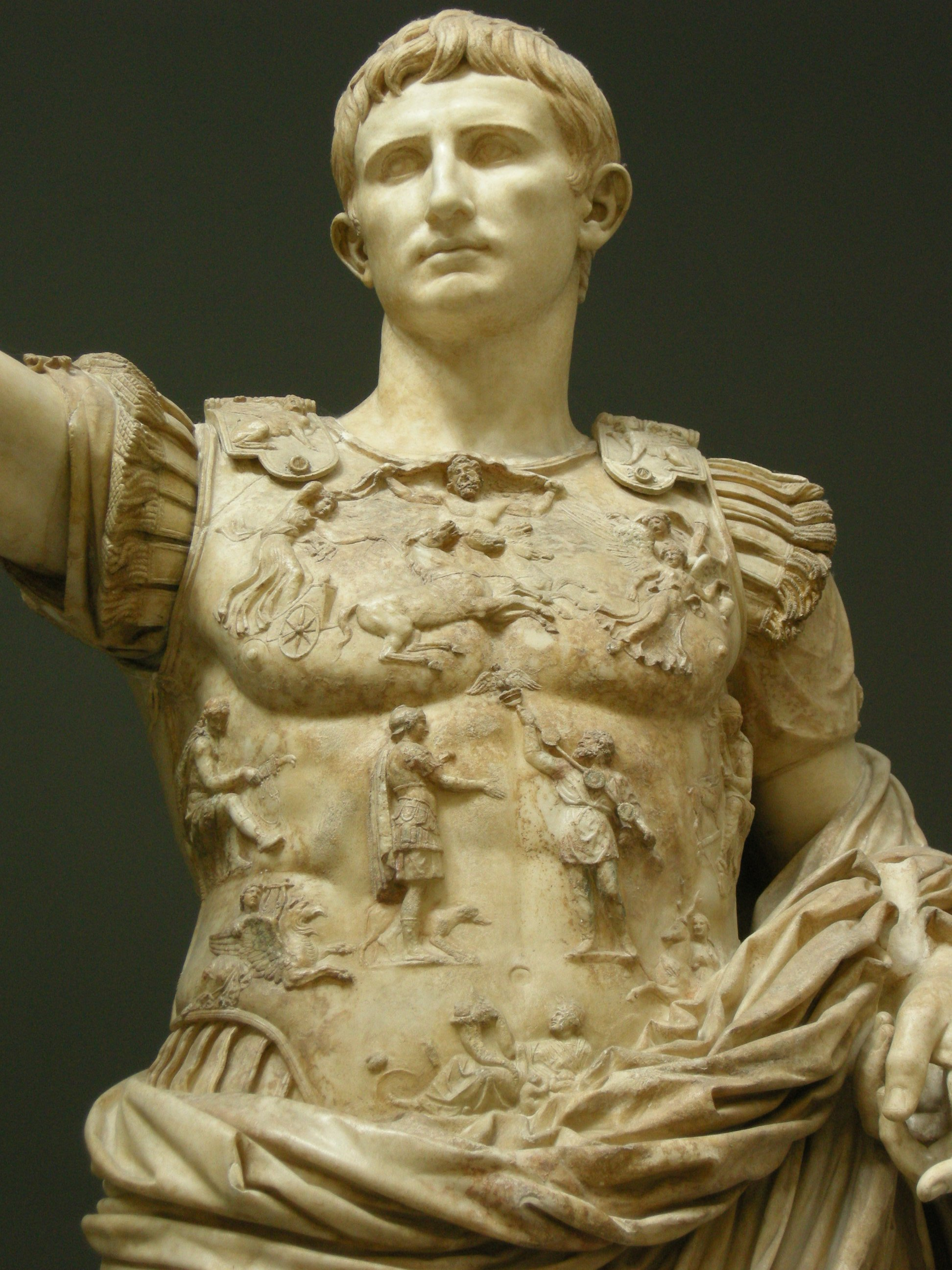
Detail of the breastplate

=== Portrait ===
The haircut is made up of divided, thick strands of hair, with a strand directly over the middle of Augustus's forehead framed by other strands over it. From the left two strands stray onto the forehead, and from the right three strands, a hairstyle first found on this statue. This hairstyle also marks the statue as being one of Augustus from comparison with his portrait on his coinage, which can also date it. This particular hairstyle is used as the first sign identifying this portrait type of Augustus as the Prima Porta type, the second and most popular of three official portrait types: other hairstyles of Augustus may be seen on the Ara Pacis, for example. Another full-size statue of Augustus with these "Primaporta type" features is the Augustus of Via Labicana, portraying Augustus in the role of Pontifex Maximus, now in the Museo Nazionale Romano.

The face is idealized, but not like those of Polykleitos' statues. Augustus's face is not smoothed and shows details to indicate his individual features. Art underwent important changes during Augustus's reign, with the extreme realism that dominated art of the Republican era giving way to Greek influence, as seen in the portraits of the emperors – idealizations that summarized all the virtues Roman society held should be possessed by the exceptional man worthy of governing the Empire. In earlier portraits, Augustus allowed himself to be portrayed in monarchical fashion, but amended these with later more diplomatic images that represented him as "primus inter pares". The head and neck were produced separately in Parian marble and inserted to the torso.

=== Breastplate relief ===
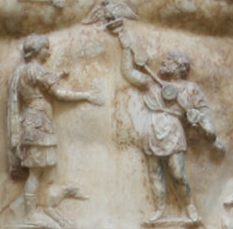
A close-up view of the breastplate on the statue, showing a Parthian man returning to Augustus the legionary standards lost by Marcus Licinius Crassus at Carrhae

The statue's iconography is frequently compared to that of the carmen saeculare by Horace, and commemorates Augustus's establishment of the Pax Romana. The breastplate is carved in relief with numerous small figures depicting the return, thanks to the diplomacy of Augustus, of the Roman legionary eagles or aquilae lost to Parthia by Mark Antony in the 40s BC and by Crassus in 53 BC.

The figure in the centre, according to the most common interpretation, is the subjected Parthian king (Phraates IV) returning Crassus's standard to an armored Roman (possibly Tiberius, or symbolically Mars Ultor or the incarnation of the ideal legionary). Another theory sees in the male figure the ideal incarnation of the Roman legions. This was a very popular subject in Augustan propaganda, as one of his greatest international successes, and had to be especially strongly emphasized, since Augustus had been deterred by Parthian military strength from the war which the Roman people had expected and had instead opted for diplomacy. Below the armed figure we can see a dog, or probably a wolf or, according to archaeologist Ascanio Modena Altieri, a she-wolf, nurse of Romulus and Remus. To the left and right sit mourning female figures; the figure on the one side with a sheathed sword personifies the peoples in the East (and possibly the Teutons) forced to pay tribute to Rome, and the one on the other side with an unsheathed sword personifies the subjected peoples (the Celts). From the top, clockwise, we see:

- Caelus, the sky god, spreading the tent of the sky
- Aurora and Luna
- the personification of the subjected peoples
- the goddess Diana
- the earth goddess Ceres/Tellus—similarly represented on the Ara Pacis
- Apollo, Augustus's patron
- the personification of the tributary peoples
- the sun god Sol
- a Sphinx on each shoulder, representing the defeat of Cleopatra by Augustus

The cuirass is not solely frontal; there is a backside to the armor as well. On the bottom right side of the back of the cuirass, there is a helmeted trophy with a wing above, a carnyx on the left hip, and greaves against a tree trunk. There was an iron peg that is thought to have connected the statue to a wall. This is likely due to the back being unfinished

None of these interpretations are undisputed. The gods, however, probably all symbolize the continuity and logical consistency of the events—just as the sun and moon forever rise, so Roman successes are certain and divinely sanctioned. Furthermore, these successes are connected with the wearer of this breastplate, Augustus. The only active person is the Parthian king, implying that everything else is divinely desired and ordained.

=== Divine status ===
During his lifetime, Augustus did not wish to be depicted as a god (unlike the later emperors who embraced divinity), but this statue has many thinly veiled references to the emperor's "divine nature", his genius. Augustus is shown barefoot, which indicates that he is a hero and perhaps even a divus, and also adds a civilian aspect to an otherwise military portrait. Being barefoot was only previously allowed on images of the gods, but it may also imply that the statue is a posthumous copy set up by Livia of a statue from the city of Rome in which Augustus was not barefoot.

The small Cupid (son of Venus) at his feet (riding on a dolphin, Venus's patron animal) is a reference to the claim that the Julian family were descended from the goddess Venus, made by both Augustus and by his great uncle Julius Caesar—a way of claiming divine lineage without claiming the full divine status. The dolphin which Cupid rides has a political significance. It suggests that Augustus has won the battle of Actium and defeated one of his primary rivals, Mark Antony.

== Type ==
The Prima Porta-type of statues of Augustus, of which Augustus of Prima Porta is the most famous example, became the prevailing representational style for him. This type was introduced around 27 BC to visually express the title Augustus and was copied full-length and in busts in various versions throughout the empire up until his death in AD 14. The copies never showed Augustus looking older, however, but represented him as forever young, in line with the aims of his propaganda, i.e. to display the authority of the Roman emperors through conventional styles and stories of the culture. At its best, in Roland R. R. Smith's view, this "type achieves a sort [of] visual paradox that might be described as mature, ageless, and authoritative youthfulness".

== Discovery ==
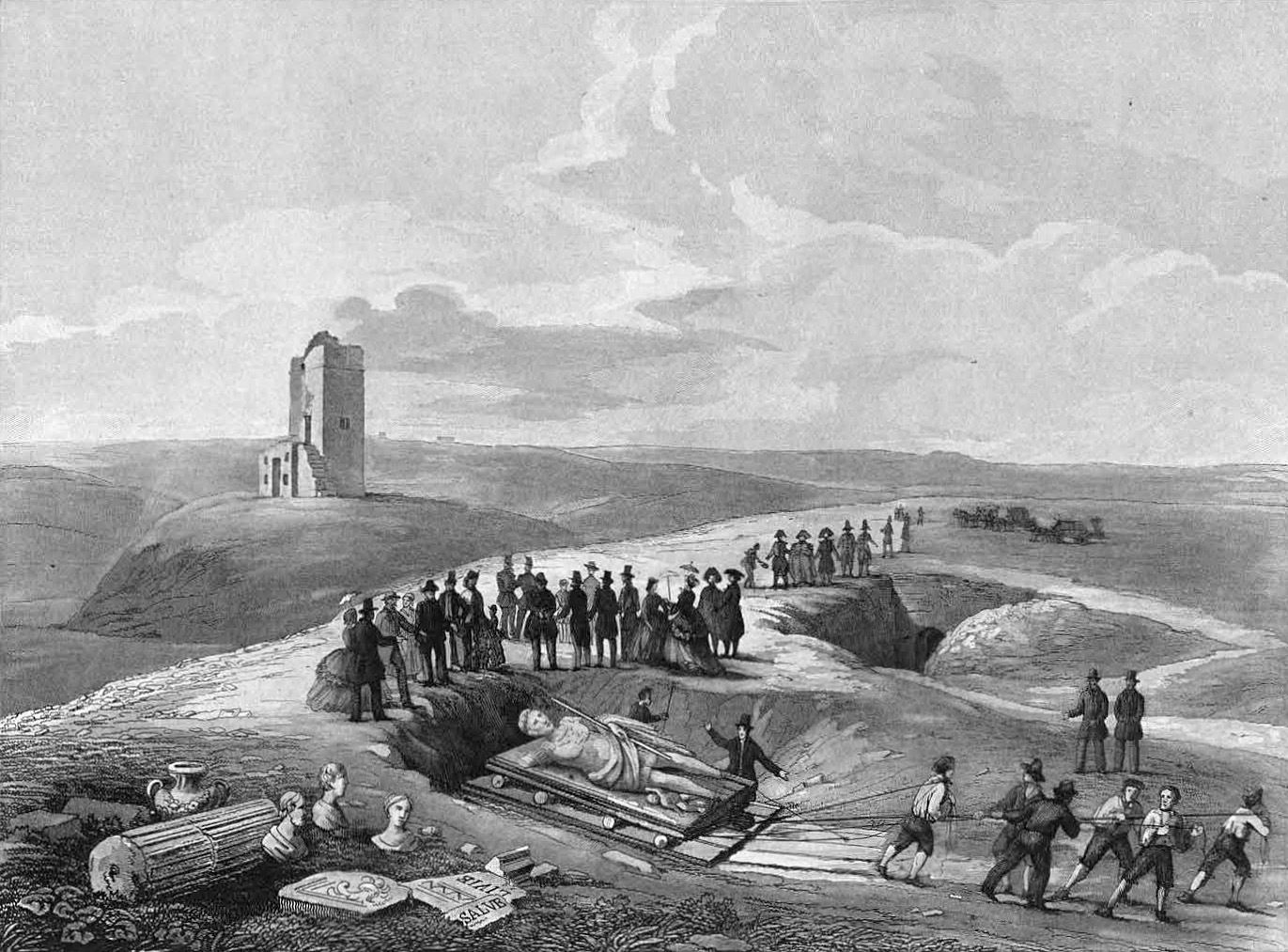
Lithograph depicting the discovery of the statue, published in 1865

The statue of Augustus of Prima Porta was discovered within the Villa of Livia in 1863. Little is known about the discovery itself and its immediate aftermath, as the incomplete archaeological journals leave ambiguous evidence for modern historians. The statue was first publicized by the German archaeologist Wilhelm Henzen in 1863 in the Bulletino dell'Instituto di Corrispondenza Archaeologica. The exact location of the statue within the villa is unknown. Suggested sites are the underground complex, a placement near a staircase, the villa's atrium, or in a laurel grove on the southeast corner of Prima Porta hill. Scholars have stated that the last one is relatively unconvincing compared with the first three.

The theory that Augustus's statue was found in the underground complex of the villa is based on a hypothesis that Augustus holds a laurel branch instead of a spear in his left hand. Scholars have noted that if this hypothesis is correct, then Villa of Livia must have been decorated with laurel groves and that the reason of the decoration is the omen of the gallina alba (Latin: white hen).

Recent excavations have discovered the remnants of pots used to plant laurel on the edge of the Prima Porta hill in front of the underground complex, which Reeder believes suggests the possibility of the existence of laurel groves in the villa and makes it likely that the statue was located in the underground complex. She rationalized this by stating that per Suetonius, Augustus had a fear of lightning and often hid in 'an underground vaulted room', which she theorizes was likely the underground complex, particularly as during the time of Augustus laurels were thought to provide protection from lightning.

Scholars who disagree with the theory have argued that although the pot remnants could have been used to plant laurel, such pots were also used for other plants such as lemons. They also state that according to an 1891 drawing made 25 years after the first excavation, Prima Porta Augustus was found at the bottom of the staircase leading to the underground complex, not the complex itself. Alan Klynne and Peter Liljenstolpe have further noted that the statue could have been brought to the basement from another location such as the atrium, where it would have stood on a rectangular structure that stands right on the axis against the south wall of the atrium. As visitors would enter the atrium from the fauces at the northeastern corner, the statue would be the first thing that they would see and that they would view it from the left, which fits Kähler's idea that it should be seen from this position. When the visitor walked across the atrium their eyes would meet with Augustus's right hand, thus "receiving" the address that Augustus made.

The story of the gallina alba (white hen) narrates that after Livia married Octavian an eagle dropped a hen holding laurel seeds in its beak onto Livia's lap, which the religious authorities of Rome took as a sign of blessing and divinity. The plant was ordered to be planted with great religious care at what is now known as the villa surbana, where it grew into a grove. According to Jane Clark Reeder, when Julio-Claudians had military success they would take a laurel branch from the villa.

== See also ==
- Via Labicana Augustus
- Equestrian Statue of Marcus Aurelius
- Colossus of Constantine

Preceded by Apollo Belvedere	Landmarks of Rome; Augustus of Prima Porta	Succeeded by Colossus of Constantine
