= Coat of arms of Águas de São Pedro =

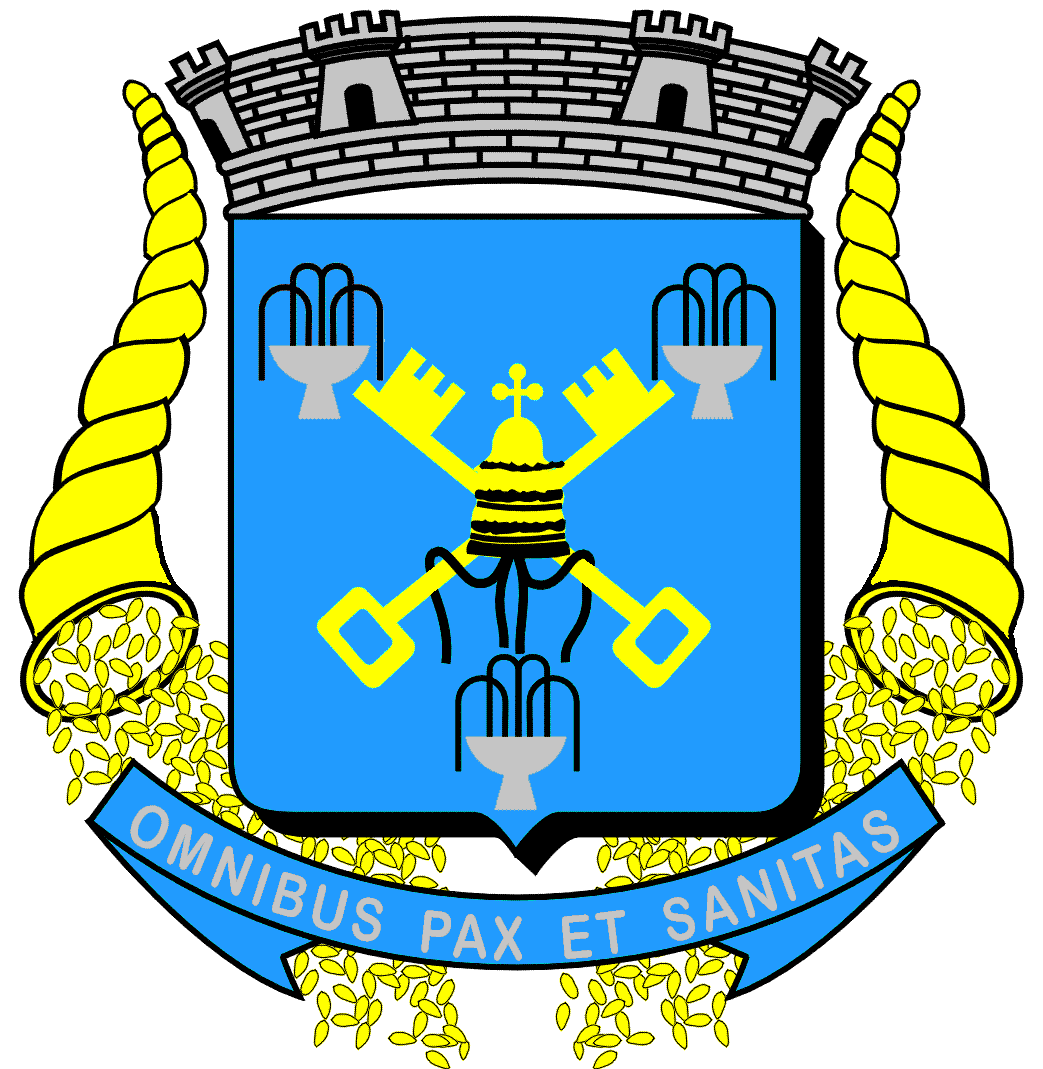
- Armiger: The Municipality of Águas de São Pedro
- Adopted: 1971
- Crest: A mural crown argent with six towers
- Shield: Azure Samnite shield; in the fess point, two keys in saltire Or beneath a papal tiara Or; in the dexter and sinister chief and in the middle base are three heraldic fountains argent
- Supporters: Two cornucopias sprinkling coins, all in Or
- Motto: Omnibus Pax et Sanitas (Latin for Peace and Health for Everyone)
- Use: On official buildings; in the header of the official documents

The coat of arms of the Municipality of the Hydromineral Spa of Águas de São Pedro (Portuguese: Brasão de Armas do Município da Estância Hidromineral de Águas de São Pedro) is the official coat of arms of Águas de São Pedro.

== History ==
The coat of arms of Águas de São Pedro was designed by the heraldist Professor Arcinoé Antonio Peixoto de Faria, from the Municipalist Heraldic Encyclopedia (Portuguese: Enciclopédia Heráldica Municipalista). It was created by the request of the municipal government, that needed a symbol to represent the city.

== Use ==
The coat of arms of Águas de São Pedro started to be used in the Municipal Office in the beginning of 1971, but was only officialized by law on July 7, 1972. Before 1971 it was the coat of arms of the state of São Paulo that was used in the municipal official documents.

Despite all the rules imposed by the law for the display of the coat of arms, it is very common to see it being exhibited with several errors, like on the city's website, such as the use of the bleu celeste instead of azure on the shield, and display of the Or tincture in the fonts and letters of the motto in the scroll, instead of the correct argent tincture.

It is currently used in the header of official documents, official buildings, on municipal ID cards, in the flag of the municipality, and in the Municipal Order of the Coat.

== Blazon ==
According to the text of the Municipal Law number 408 of July 7, 1972, Article I, the heraldic blazon of Águas de São Pedro's coat of arms is:

Escudo samnítico encimado pela coroa mural de seis torres, de argente. Em campo de bláu, posta em abismo, a panóplia constituída de duas chaves entrecruzadas, tendo brocante a tiára papal, tudo de jalde. Acantonados em chefe e ao têrmo, três fontes heráldicas de argente. Apoiando o escudo, à dextra e sinistra, duas cornucópias de jalde espargindo moedas do mesmo, tendo brocante um listel de bláu, contendo em letras argentinas a divisa latina "Omnibus Pax et Sanitas".

Samnite shield surmounted by a mural crown with six towers argent. In an azure field, put into abyss, the panoply consists in two keys in saltire having in the fess point a papal tiara, all in Or. Stationed in chief and in base, three heraldic fountains argent. Supporting the shield, at dextra and sinister, two cornucopias Or sprinkling coins of the same metal, having in its front a scroll azure with the Latin motto in argent letters: "OMNIBUS PAX ET SANITAS".

== Symbolism ==
The symbols of the coat of arms are described in the Single Paragraph of Article I of the Law number 408 of July 7, 1972, as follows:

=== Shield ===
The samnite shield used to represent the coat of arms of the Spa of Águas de São Pedro was the first style of shield introduced in Portugal by French influence, inherited by the Brazilian heraldry as an evocative of the colonizing race and main molder of the Brazilian nationality.

In abyss (the center or heart of the shield) the panoply constituted by intersected keys beneath a papal tiara, all in Or (gold), constitutes its canting arms, for being symbol of Saint Peter, Patron Saint of the city (the keys of the Kingdom of God and the Tiara of the first Pope, Saint Peter).

=== Mural crown ===
The mural crown that crowns the shield is the universal symbol of the coats of arms of dominion, and being of argent (silver) with six towers, which only four are visible in perspective in the drawing, classify the city represented as the seat of a municipality.

=== Tinctures ===
The tincture azure (blue) in the field of the shield is symbol of nobility, justice, perseverance, zeal and loyalty; the metal Or (gold) is symbol of glory, splendor, grandness, wealth, sovereignty; the metal argent (silver) is symbol of peace, friendship, labour, prosperity, purity, religiosity.

=== Three fountains ===
The three heraldic fountains argent (silver) reminds in the escutcheon the three mineral water fountains existent in the city, one of them with sulphurous waters, gift of nature that constitutes the main municipal wealth, reason of its autonomy to the progressist evolution, origin of the toponym that the city boasts ("Águas" means "Waters" in Portuguese).

=== Supporters ===
As supporters, two cornucopias sprinkling coins, all in Or (gold) symbolizing abundance, richness, and the wealth that comes from the soil with its fountains with miraculous waters.

=== Motto ===
In a scroll azure (blue) in letters argent (silver) it is inscribed the Latin motto "Omnibus Pax et Sanitas" that is an invitation to tourism and recreation, meaning For everyone, peace and health.
