= Via Labicana Augustus =

Ancient Roman sculpture

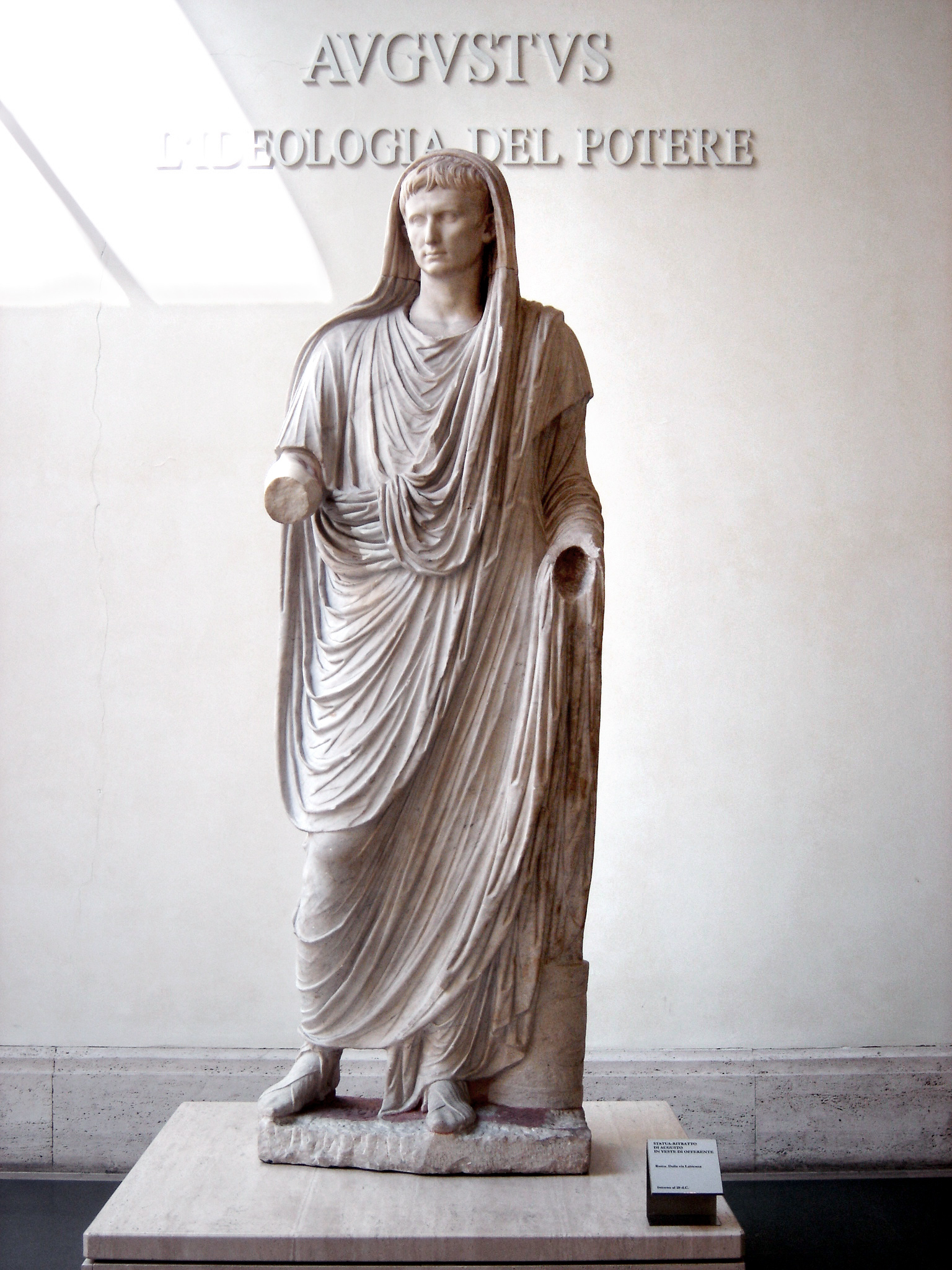
The Via Labicana statue of Augustus.

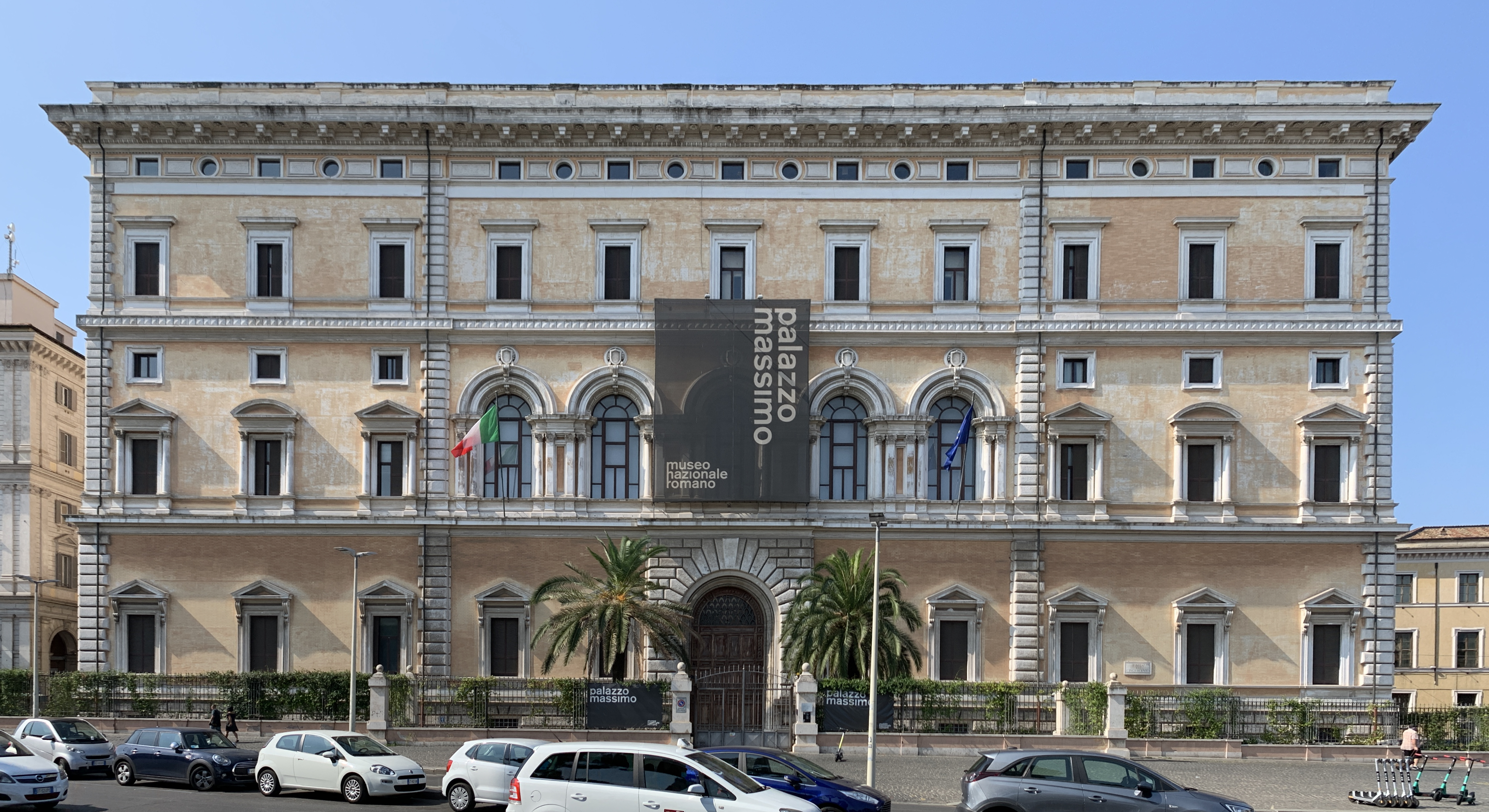
Museo Nazionale Romano Palazzo Massino alle Therme

The Via Labicana Augustus is a marble statue of the Roman emperor Augustus as Pontifex Maximus depicted in religious ceremony. This statue is a physical representation of the imperial power Augustus had over the Roman Empire by means of religious authority, contrary to depictions of militaristic authority, such as Augustus of Prima Porta.

== Overview ==
In 1910, the statue was discovered on slopes of the Oppian Hill, in the Via Labicana. It is dated as having been made after 12 BCE, the year Augustus was appointed Rome's Chief Priest. Today, it is in the Palazzo Massimo alle Terme at the National Museum of Rome.

== Description ==
The statue of Via Labicana Augustus was carved out of two separate pieces of marble and stands at 208cm (82in). It is known that the statue was built from two separate pieces due to the distinct marble types used for the body and the head. During Augustus' reign of emperor, he had opened up a quarry in Luna, a town in Northern Italy. From there, a "stock", sculpted body made of Luna marble (Carrara) was purchased to be the body of this statue. The head, however, was carved using Greek Pentelic marble. This evidence points us to lead that the body was sculpted by a Roman artist while a Greek artist sculpted the head.

== Iconography ==
As Pontifex Maximus, Augustus bore religious iconography to describe himself as such. Augustus is shown wearing a toga with the sinus wrapped over his left arm, and a veil draping over his head. Scholars were able to decipher that he is being depicted as chief high priest due to the veil. This religious symbol is known as capite velato (veiled head), it indicates priesthood, and was used during ritualistic sacrifices to the gods to show reverence. The right arm was most likely holding a patera, which is a round shallow dish used to pour out libations to the gods. According to the Dictionary of Roman Coins, the patera functioned as a symbol used by Roman rulers and priests to signify religious credibility.

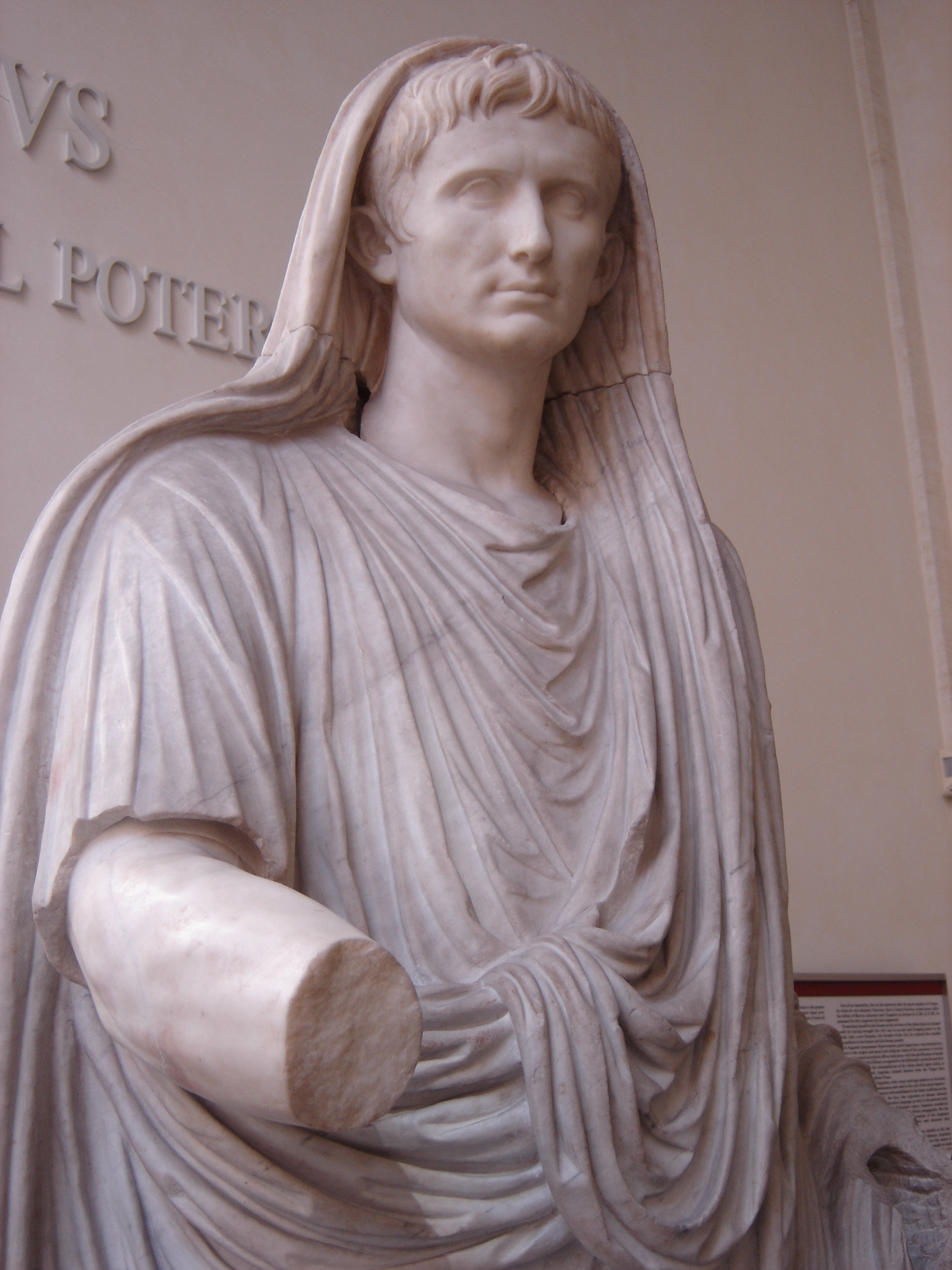
Augustus veiled as Pontifex Maximus

Despite looking youthful in this portraiture, Augustus, who had been born in 63 BCE, would have been 51 by the time he gained the position of Pontifex Maximus in 12 BCE. Being the first emperor of the Imperial Rome, Augustus instilled an idealogical theme to the medium of portraiture through the use of Hellenistic and heroic features. This idealistic portraiture type would continue through the Augustan and Julio-Claudian periods, emphasizing youthfulness, beauty, and benevolence to gain the likeness of the Roman populace.

== Pontifex Maximus ==
Via Labicana Augustus Pontifex Maximus is a title which means chief high priest. Before Augustus, this title had been given to the ruler of the Collegium Pontificum (College of Pontiffs). This collection of people was made of religious priests of the Roman state and distinguished politicians, and were ruled over by the Pontifex Maximus.

Following the assassination of Julius Caesar in 44 B.C., a period of unrest and civil war began, ending with the defeat of Mark Antony and Cleopatra at Actium in 31 B.C.. In 27 B.C., with Octavian as the undisputed ruler of Rome, the Senate granted him titles Augustus and primus inter pares (the first among equals). Augustus' rule marked the end of the Roman Republic, and the birth of the Empire. Augustus became the Pontifex Maximus when Lepidus, the previous Pontifex Maximus, died in late 13 or early 12 BCE. As Pontifex Maximus he had his religious responsibilities, but this title also game him imperial power over the Roman religion.

== Historical context ==
The statue adds another aspect to Augustus' self-representation; not only is he the political head of the Roman Empire, he is also the religious head of it. In the Res Gestae 19-21 he talks about all of his religious benefactions to the city of Rome, such as building temples for "Minerva, Queen Juno and Jupiter Libertas."

== Related statues ==
Augustan representations in statue form are highly controlled to the extent that there are only three or four different subgroups; based on features such as the detail of the hairstyle this may be classified as one of the "Prima Porta type". This depiction of Augustus is similar to a depiction of him in relief on the exterior of the Ara Pacis Augustae. As with all of Augustus' statues he is depicted in an idealizing Greek style and as much younger than his actual age at the time, as opposed to the traditional Republican Roman portraiture, which is realist in its approach.
