= Adlocutio =

Roman general's address to his soldiers

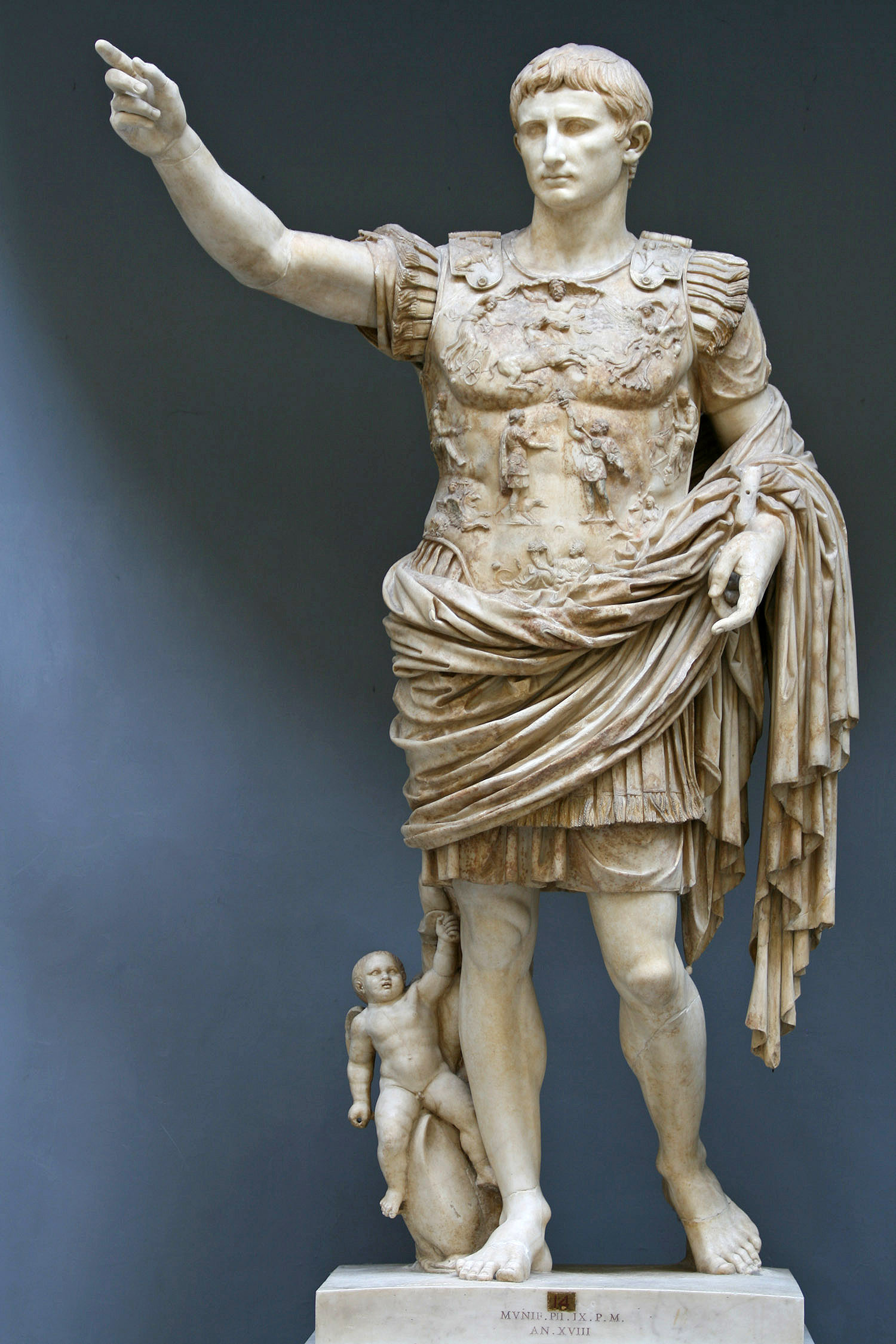
The Augustus of Prima Porta is an example of an adlocutio pose.

In ancient Rome the Latin word adlocutio means an address given by a general, usually the emperor, to his massed army and legions. The research of adlocutio focuses on the art of statuary and coinage aspects. It is often portrayed in sculpture, either simply as a single, life-size contrapposto figure of the general with his arm outstretched, or a relief scene of the general on a podium addressing the army. Such relief scenes also frequently appear on imperial coinage.

The adlocutio is one of the most widely represented formulas of Roman art. The convention is regularly shown in individual figures like the famous Augustus of Prima Porta or can be put into a narrative context as seen in the Aurelian panel. Gestures and body language are crucial for the study of adlocutio in ancient times, as addressing to thousands of soldiers was less penetrable by voice compared to body language and gestures which were more powerful, infectiously raising the army's enthusiasm. Characteristic of the formula is the outstretched hand of speech as well as the contrapposto pose with the weight clearly shifted to one leg. Much information about adlocutio can be interpreted by these sculptures.

== The Augustus of Prima Porta ==
The outstretched right hand raised by Augustus can be seen as power and authority, even in the point of view of gods in ancient Rome, right hand represents divinity, and this characteristic is also illustrated by Cancelleria Reliefs with the emperor's right hand raised among the gods. The bare feet of Augustus may seems incongruous as compared with the cuirassed details in the chest. This indicates the heroicization of Augustus could be posthumous. This feature also adds civilian portrait to the statue besides military aspect. The small Cupid besides the right leg claims the divine lineage and status. The breastplate relief in front of him depicts the gods. The spear in the left hand is a symbol of Augustus' ruling power over the empire.

== Roman coinage ==
Many Roman AE/As coins are with adlocutio of emperors. The coinages of adlocutio tell the differences between the ways each emperor addressing the army.

=== AE of Caligula with adlocutio cohortium ===
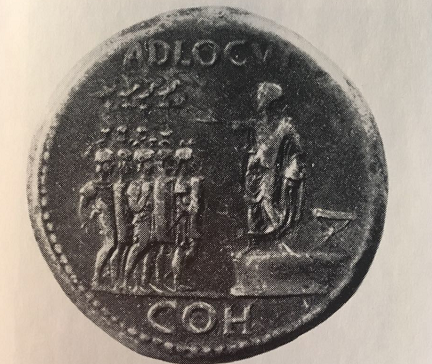
AE of Caligula with adlocutio cohortium

The term "ADLOCVT COH" refers to adlocutio cohortium, which means the address given by the emperor towards the cohorts as the AE coin is presenting. Caligula uses the typical gesture: outstretching raised-arm salute, bent left leg. The soldiers are standing in a compact line.

=== AE of Nero with adlocutio ===
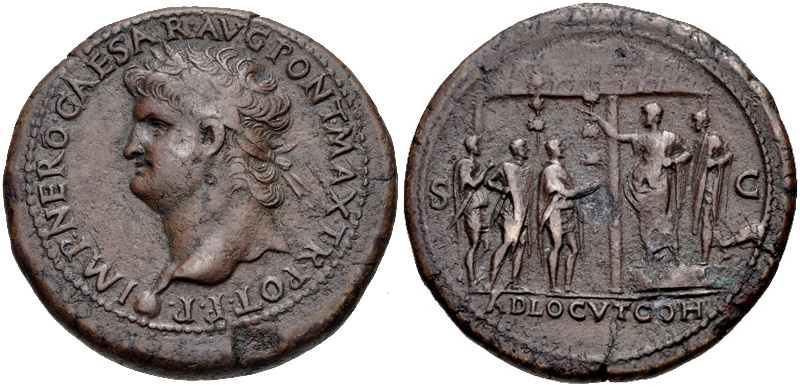
AE of Nero with adlocutio

In the coin AE of Nero with adlocutio, soldiers are standing in more scattered position compared to those who are depicted in AE of Caligula with adlocutio, which are adhering in a mass. Also the weakened architectural background and the sheltering roof covering soldiers and their commander can be interpreted as more amiable atmosphere between Nero and his soldiers. Nero is not standing alone on the platform, there is the Praetorian prefect who stands behind him.

== Panel relief of Marcus Aurelius ==
This panel presents an integral angle looking at adlocutio scene. On this panel depicting the adlocutio event, emperor Marcus Aurelius is doing an adlocutio toward the army with his son-in-law Pompeianus standing behind him as an adviser, making Marcus Aurelius stand out as the leader, the imperator of the army.

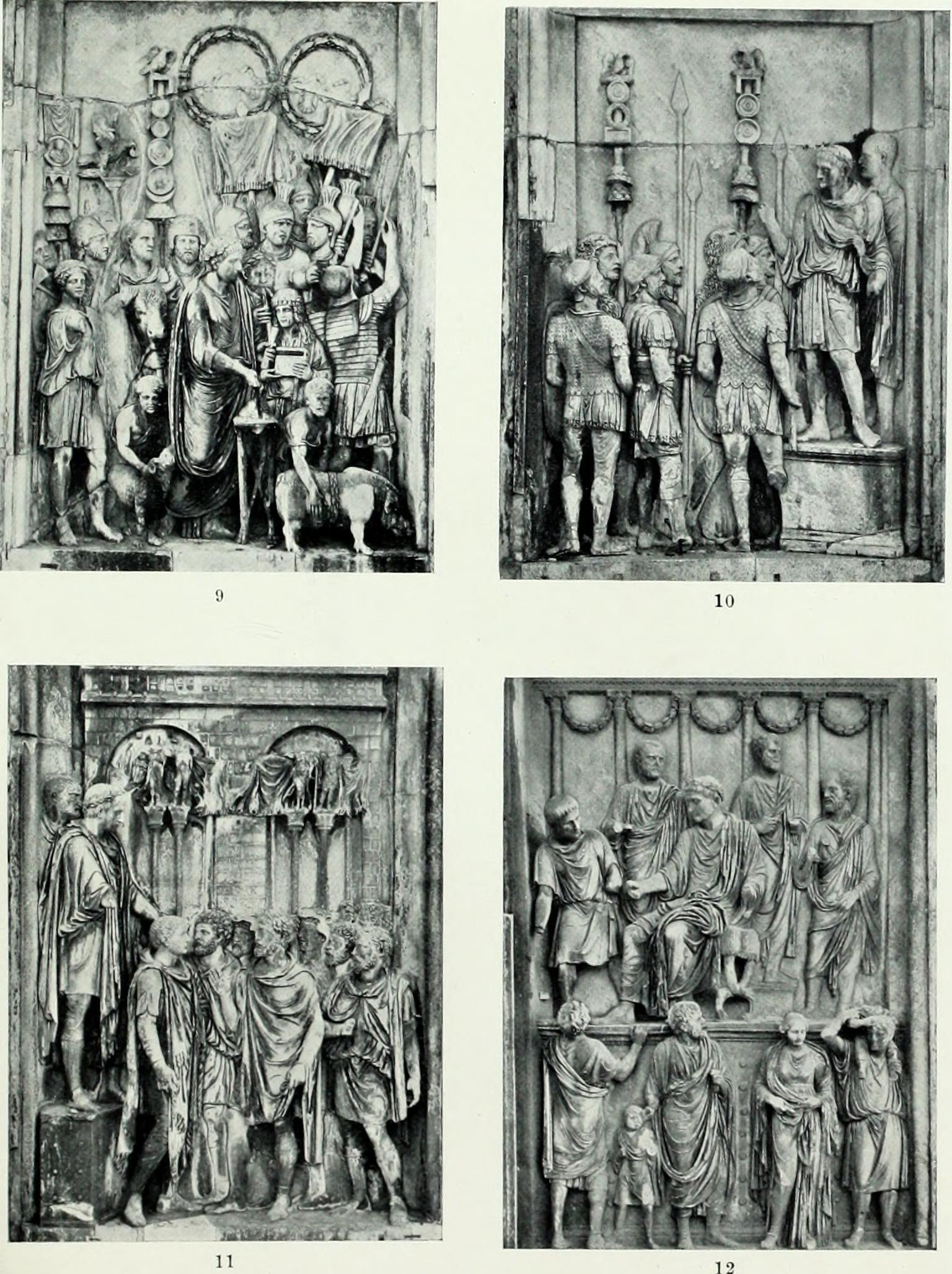
The Aurelian panel depicts an adlocutio event (upper-right).

== Salute from the army ==
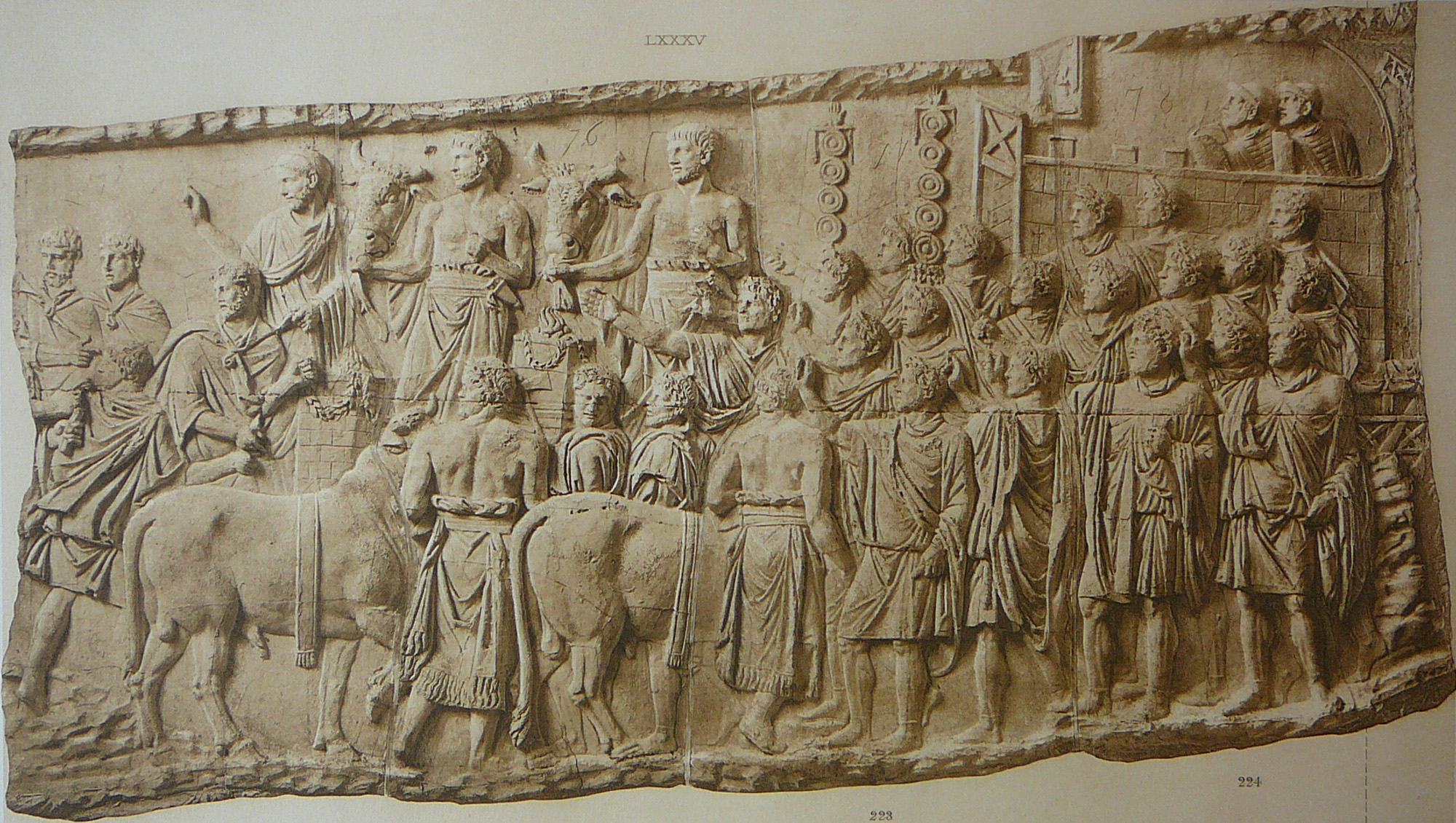
Trajan's Column. Trajan's Sacrifice. Salute from the crowd

The Roman salute in military contexts, is often seen as the right hands raised from the soldiers to their leader's head. As depicted in the Trajan's Column, Scenes LXXXIV-LXXXV. Trajan conducting sacrifice, half of the crowd raise arms extended straight and another half bent at the elbow. Among the straight arms, one palm is open but held vertically; on the others, both thumb and index fingers are extended with others bent back. And for the hands of the bent arm, their fingers on the hands are pointing downwards. The adlocutio scenes depicted in sculpture and on coins and medallions are almost identical to this raised-arm salute. The first-century-A.D. teacher of rhetoric and author of most Roman oratory handbook, Quintilian has discussed about the hand and arm gestures, the emperor's raised hands carry the message of mighty force of absolute power to his soldiers and civilians, and when a hand is raised above shoulder height, the gesture is probably signalling the warning as "illa cava et rara et super umeri altitudinem elata ... velut hortatrix manus." . This information might be the historical origin to Nazi Germany's straight-arm salute.

== Use of the adlocutio pose ==
During the Renaissance, painters and sculptors continued to use this pose. The pose was made available to a larger public by Antonio Lafreri whose compilation of ancient images or Speculum Romanae Magnificentiae, contained several emperors in this pose. In the Hall of Constantine at the Vatican, we can view the fresco of The Vision of the Cross completed by assistants to Raphael after his death in 1520. Standing on a boulder with right hand raised, Constantine is addressing his soldiers, but also pointing to a cross in the sky. The use of adlocutio is also found in literary texts that evoke the Roman era. For example, in Miguel de Cervantes play, Numancia Scipio, the Roman general addresses his troops in like manner

The gestures of adlocutio as a sign of power is found in a number of statues of leaders and thinkers of the ancient past and in modernity. These include: Saddam Hussein, Kim Il Sung, Vladimir Lenin, Joseph Stalin, Mao Zedong, Captain James Cook, Marcus Aurelius and Augustus to name a few.
