= Panoply =

Complete suit of armor, especially of a Greek hoplite

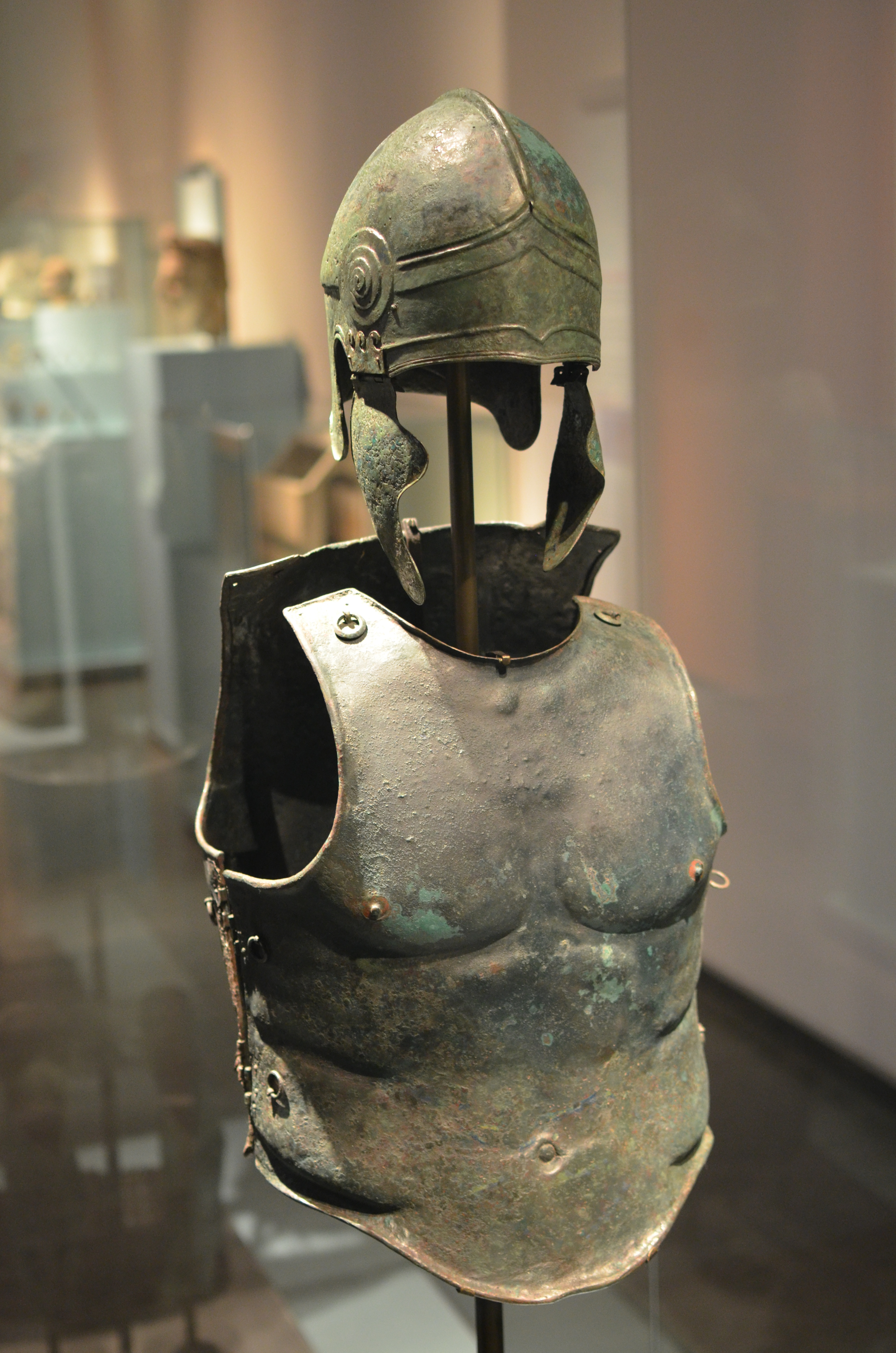
A bronze helmet and muscle cuirass of an ancient Greek panoply, on display at the Rijksmuseum van Oudheden

A panoply is a complete suit of armor. The word represents the Ancient Greek πανοπλία (panoplía), where the word πᾶν (pân) means "all", and ὅπλον (hóplon) means "arms". Thus, panoply refers to the full armor of a hoplite or heavily armed soldier, i.e. the shield, breastplate, helmet, and greaves, together with the sword and spear.

As applied to armor of a later date, panoply did not come into use until the end of the 16th and beginning of the 17th century, and was then used of the complete suits of plate armor covering the whole body.

Because a panoply is a complete set of diverse components, the word panoply has come to refer to any complete or impressive collection.
