= Wilhelm Henzen =

German philologist and epigraphist

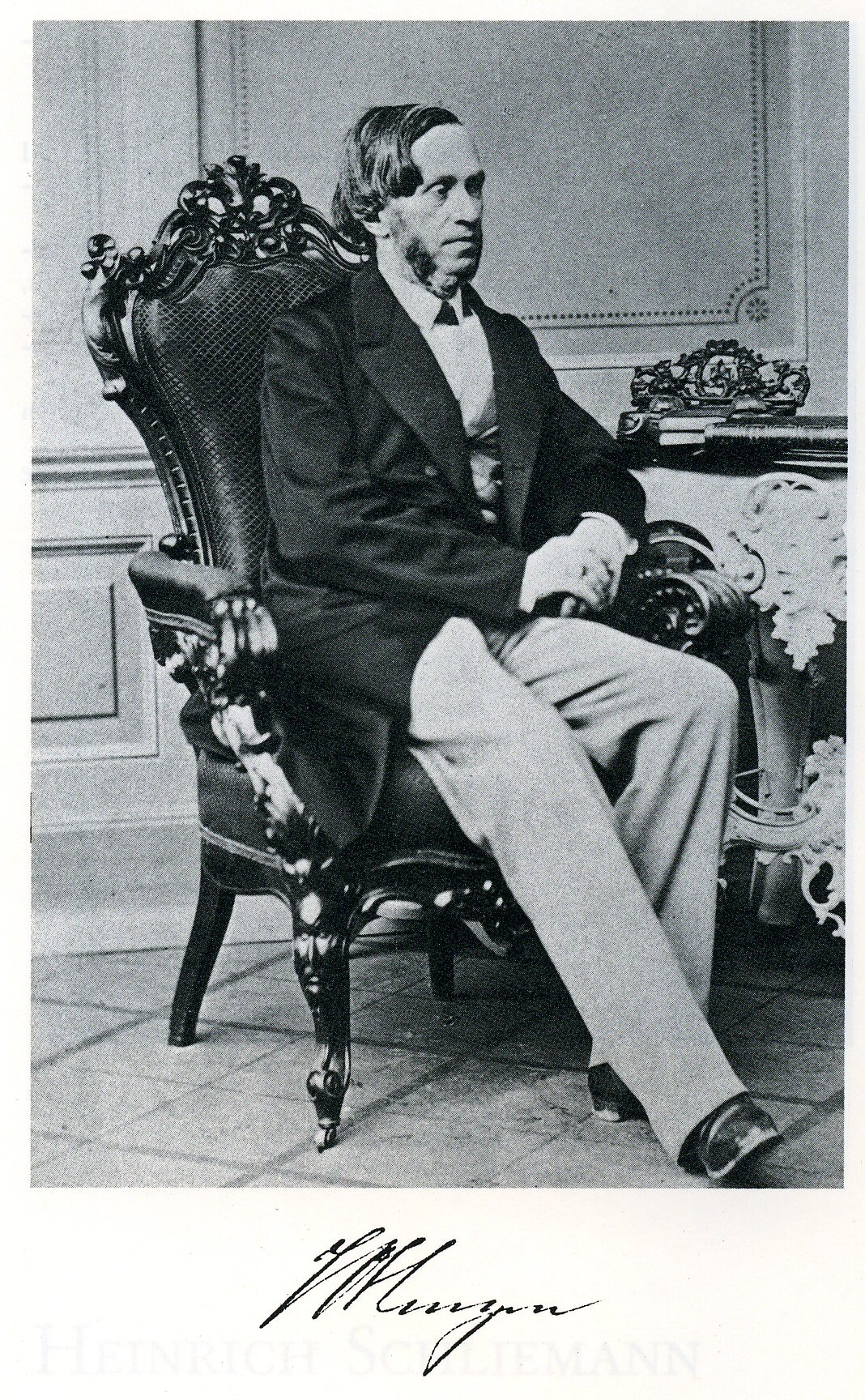
Wilhelm Henzen.

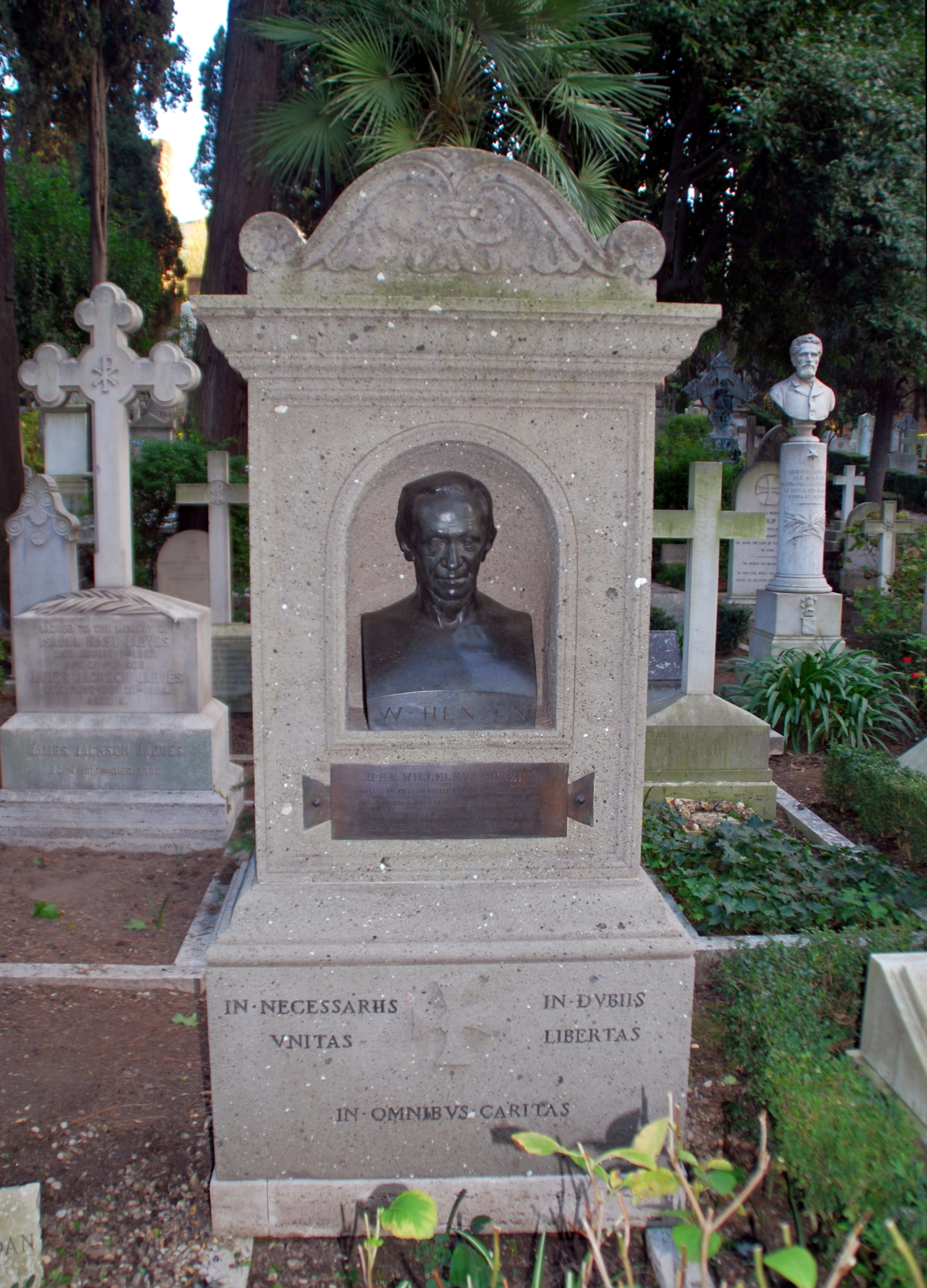
Headstone of Henzen in the Protestant Cemetery, Rome

Johann Heinrich Wilhelm Henzen (24 January 1816 in Bremen; 27 January 1887 in Rome) was a German philologist and epigraphist born in Bremen.

He studied philology at the Universities of Bonn and Berlin, afterwards traveling to Paris and London, where he furthered his education by becoming fluent in French and English. With Friedrich Gottlieb Welcker (1784-1868), he undertook archaeological investigations in Italy and Greece, and in 1842 settled in Rome, where in 1856 he succeeded August Emil Braun (1809-1856) as first secretary of the Deutsches Archäologisches Institut (German Archaeological Institute). From 1876 onward, he was a member of the Accademia dei Lincei.

Henzen was a leading authority on Latin epigraphy. With Theodor Mommsen (1817-1903) and Giovanni Battista de Rossi (1822-1894), he carried out plans for a universal "Corpus Inscriptionum Latinarum" based on a scheme presented to the Berlin Academy by Mommsen in 1847. Also, he provided a supplemental volume to Johann Caspar von Orelli's collection of Latin inscriptions, "Inscriptionum latinarum collectio" (1856).

== Selected works ==
- "Quaestionum polybianarum specimen, continens vitam...", Berolini: Brandes & Klewert, 1840.
- "Tabula alimentaria Baebianorum : illustravit deque publicis Romanorum alimentis" (dissertation), 1845.
- Iscrizione onoraria d'Adriano / illustrata da G. Henzen, Roma : Tipografia tiberina, 1862.
- Scavi nel bosco sacro de' fratelli Arvali, 1869.
- Wilhelm Henzen und das Institut auf dem Kapitol, (with Eduard Gerhard and Hans-Georg Kolbe).
