= Timeline of Águas de São Pedro =

The following is a timeline of the history of the city of Águas de São Pedro, Brazil.

== 19th century ==
- 1875 – The first immigrants arrive in the region of São Pedro.

== 20th century ==
- 1921 – The first oil prospecting starts in São Pedro.
- 1929 – The Great Crash affects the city based on the coffee economy.
- 1934
  - Built the first bath house by Angelo Franzin.
  - Carlos Mauro, Patrício Miguel Carreta, José Matarazzo, Victorio Mazziero, Joviano Nouer, Ernesto Giocondo, Antônio Albino Ribeiro, João Batista Algodoal and Emílio Marozzi buy an area of 4-alqueire around the bath house.
  - Octavio Moura Andrade makes his first visit to São Pedro.
- 1935
  - Creation of the company Águas Sulfídricas e Termais de São Pedro S.A. (Saint Peter Thermal and Sulphydric Waters S.A.).
  - Construction of a new bath house.
  - Start of the analysis of mineral waters by the Institute for Technological Research (IPT) of the University of São Paulo.
- 1936 – 26 January: Beginning of the publication of Nosso Jornal newspaper, which later came to be called, from its second issue, Caldas de São Pedro.
- 1938 – 6 February: Inauguration of São Pedro Airport and beginning of the construction of the Grande Hotel.
- 1940
  - 19 June: São Paulo state government founded the Estância Hidromineral e Climática de Águas de São Pedro (Hydromineral and Climatic Spa of Águas de São Pedro).
  - 25 July: The Grande Hotel is inaugurated.
  - 28 July: The first great flight to São Pedro had occurred, with the participation of 78 aircraft.
  - 15 August: Beginning of the works for the drainage of rainwater and river water systems.
  - Construction of the Pensão Santo Antônio.
- 1941
  - 2–16 July: Águas de São Pedro–São Paulo 1941 chess tournament matches are held at the Grande Hotel.
  - Construction of the Vila Operária (Workers' Village).
  - Beginning of the construction of the Hotel Avenida.
- 1942
  - Beginning of mineral water bottling.
  - The Hotel Avenida is inaugurated.
- 1945 – The city central canal is completed, surrounded by grass and trees planted.
- 1946
  - Prohibition of gambling in Brazil leading to the closing of the casino of the Grande Hotel.
  - Inauguration of Our Lady of the Immaculate Conception Chapel.
- 1947 – 19–21 April: The second great flight to São Pedro (Civil Aviators Convention) had occurred.
- 1948 – 24 December: The municipality of Águas de São Pedro was incorporated.
- 1949
  - 2 April: The municipal council is installed.
  - 19 April: Carlos Mauro is appointed as Sanitary Mayor.
  - 30 November: The Grande Hotel and other properties of the city are expropriated by the state government of São Paulo.
- 1950 – 17–20 August: The Revoada Pan-Americana (Pan-American Flight), the third great flight to São Pedro, is held at the airport, with the jump of 100 army paratroopers at the same time and other presentations.
- 1951
  - 19 June: Angelo Nogueira Vila is appointed as Sanitary Mayor.
  - Inauguration of the Hotel Bela Vista.
- 1952
  - 19 June: Geraldo Vieira Azevedo is appointed as Sanitary Mayor.
  - The São Paulo state government tries to lease the Grande Hotel and all its dependencies.
- 1954
  - 26 May: The Mother Church is inaugurated.
  - 16 November: Armando Brandini is appointed as Sanitary Mayor.
- 1955 – 16 February: Eugênio Scaranello Pires is appointed as Sanitary Mayor.
- 1957 – 16 April: José Antonio Gomes Coelho is appointed as Sanitary Mayor.
- 1958 – 15 November: Armando Brandini is appointed as Sanitary Mayor.
- 1962 – 7 October: Antonio de Pádua Aguiar is appointed as mayor.
- 1966
  - 11 November: Armando Brandini is appointed as mayor.
  - 17–25 November: João José Possato stood in as mayor.
- 1968
  - 30 September: Wilson Modesto, the vice mayor, serves as acting mayor in Brandini's place.
  - 24 November: João José Possato is appointed as mayor.
- 1969 – 25 November: The Grande Hotel is leased to the Serviço Nacional de Aprendizagem Comercial (Brazilian National Commercial Training Service, known by the acronym Senac).
- 1970 – Population: 830.
- 1972
  - 1 December: Octavio Moura Andrade dies.
  - Foundation of the Community Center of Águas de São Pedro.
- 1973 – 10 September: Donation of a property to the Community Center of Águas de São Pedro by the City Hall.
- 1975 – 7 August: Angelo Nogueira Vila is appointed as mayor.
- 1979 – 10 May: João José Possato is appointed as mayor.
- 1980 – Population: 1,091.
- 1983 – 1 February: Leonardo Belmiro is appointed as mayor.
- 1986 – 8 December: The São Paulo state government transfers through donation the Grande Hotel to Senac.
- 1989 – 1 January: Luiz Antonio de Mitry Filho becomes the first elected mayor.
- 1991
  - Population: 1,697.
  - 18 November: Sister city relationship established with Cubatão, Brazil.
- 1993 – 1 January: Paulo Cesar Borges becomes mayor.
- 1994 – 17 August: The city registers its first homicide, with the deaths of Fátima Rinaldi Dante, 40 years old, and her granddaughter, Maria Virgínia Dante, 1 year old, both being shot.
- 1995 – Inauguration of the Senac Faculties.
- 1997 – 1 January: Luiz Antonio de Mitry Filho becomes mayor.
- 2000 – Population: 1,883.

== 21st century ==
- 2001 – 1 January: Luiz Antonio de Mitry Filho is reinstated as mayor.
- 2003 – 31 December: Marcelo da Silva Bueno, the vice mayor, serves as acting mayor in De Mitry Filho's place.
- 2004 – The Senac Faculties were accredited by the Brazilian Ministry of Education and Culture as University Center.
- 2005 – 1 January: Marcelo da Silva Bueno becomes mayor.
- 2009 – 1 January: Paulo Cesar Borges becomes mayor.
- 2010 – Population: 2,707.
- 2011
  - 17 January: The bridge on the SP-304 highway that connects Águas de São Pedro to Piracicaba collapsed due to heavy rain, causing economic damage and inconvenience to the city.
  - 9 July: The new bridge is inaugurated by the state governor.
- 2012
  - 26 April: Sister city relationship established with Molinaseca, Spain.
  - 23 July: The wooden structure of a swing in the Grande Hotel falls on the 4 years old girl Ines Schaller, and despite being rescued, she died minutes later. The case had national repercussions, with questions about the safety of commercial establishments, growth in the maintenance of playgrounds, and new non-mandatory safety recommendations on playgrounds were released by the Brazilian Association of Technical Standards one week after the tragedy.
- 2013
  - 1 January: Paulo Cesar Borges is reinstated as mayor.
  - A group of companies led by Telefônica Vivo announced plans to make Águas de São Pedro the first digital city in the country.
- 2016 – 21 May: Beginning of publication of the Jornal Águas News newspaper.
- 2017 – 1 January: Paulo Sergio Barboza de Lima becomes mayor.
- 2020
  - 19 February: A fire in a perfumery at Galeria Passarela completely damaged the store and melted the entire ceiling tiles of the galleria, which were made of PVC. Some stores were also damaged and there were no casualties.
  - 20 March: Due to the COVID-19 pandemic, the municipal government, through the Decree nº 5116, declares an emergency situation to face the circumstance. As of the date of publication of the decree, there were five suspected cases in the city and none confirmed.
  - 23 March: The municipal Health Secretariat confirms the first case of COVID-19 in the city. Together with another case recorded in the city of Iracemápolis, these were the first cases of the novel coronavirus recorded in the Piracicaba region.
  - 4 September: One hundred and sixty-five days after the first recorded case of COVID-19 in the city, Águas de São Pedro reached its fiftieth case. Until the time of disclosure of this data, the city was the only one in the Piracicaba region that did not register deaths due to the disease.
  - 15 September: The city registers its first death due to COVID-19, a 73-year-old man. With this data, all cities in the Piracicaba region have at least one death due to the disease.
- 2021
  - 1 January: João Victor Barboza becomes mayor.
  - 12 January: Two hundred and ninety-five days after the first recorded case of COVID-19 in the city, Águas de São Pedro reached its hundredth case. During this period, one death due to the disease was confirmed.
  - 22 January: Vaccination against COVID-19 begins in the municipality.
  - 4 June: Half of the city's population receives the first dose of the vaccine against COVID-19. Doses of CoronaVac and Oxford–AstraZeneca COVID-19 vaccines are being distributed in the municipality. Until this day, 290 cases and 5 deaths due to the disease have been confirmed in the city.

== See also ==
- List of mayors of Águas de São Pedro
