= Flight Design C4 =

German light aircraft

C4
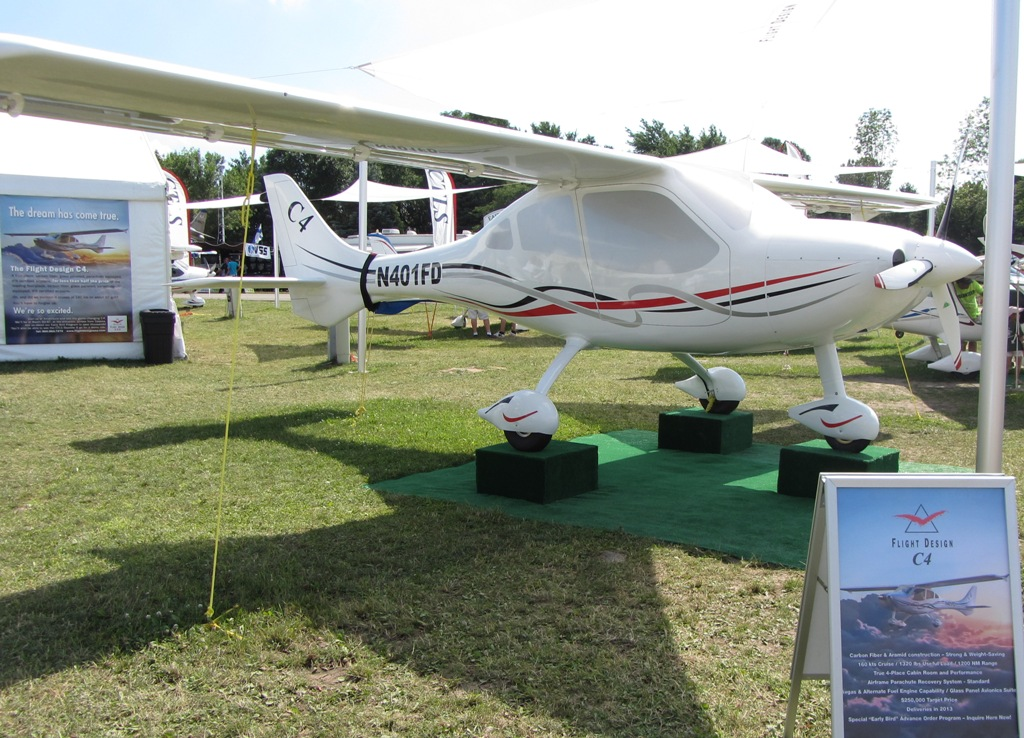
- Flight Design C4 mockup in 2011

General information
- Type: Light aircraft
- National origin: Germany
- Manufacturer: Flight Design
- Status: Under development

History
- Introduction date: 2011
- First flight: 9 April 2015
- Developed from: Flight Design CTSW

The Flight Design C4 is a German four seat, high-wing, single engine light aircraft under development by Flight Design of Leinfelden-Echterdingen.

In February 2011 the company announced that it was developing a four-seat design. The C4 was introduced at the AERO Friedrichshafen 2011 show. The company finalized the design features through an on-line survey to determine the features and performance that potential customers were looking for in a new aircraft. A full-sized exterior mock-up was also displayed at AirVenture 2011.

The aircraft first flew on 9 April 2015.

== Development ==
The company applied to start certification for the C4 under European Aviation Safety Agency rules in early 2011 and intends to gain US Federal Aviation Administration FAA certification through EASA certification reciprocity and was initially forecasting FAA approval in early 2013, although this was later delayed. First deliveries were initially forecast for 2013, at a price of 220,000 Euros or US$250,000. Company CEO Matthias Betsch indicated that the key to the aircraft's success will be the price of US$250,000, saying: "We'll do everything to make that number. That's the magic number."

In writing about the aircraft's price goal, AVweb's Paul Bertorelli wrote: "here comes Flight Designs with a certified, four-place cruiser it proposes to sell for around $250,000. Why does it think it can do this with Diamond's DA40—a comparable proven and competent airplane—sells for around $350,000? One reason is that it builds airplanes in the Ukraine, where labor rates are lower. But another may be that it hasn't certified a four-place airplane in the current market and is doing what most airplane companies do: underestimating the cost of bringing a new airplane into production. I wish them the best, but I'd rather see a realistic price that builds in the most important thing any new airplane should have: Good value for the customer and profitability for the company building the airplane. It's never in the customer's interest to have the company losing money on every sale."

At AirVenture 2011 the company indicated that they had sold 40 delivery positions. By Sun 'n Fun in March 2012 development was continuing, with a focus on selecting avionics. The company remained committed to the US$250,000 price goal and had about 65 orders for the C4. At the 2012 Aero Expo in Germany, Flight Design displayed a fuselage mock-up of the C4.

At Sun 'n Fun 2013 the company indicated that they were delaying development of the aircraft to take advantage of the Federal Aviation Administration's review of the FAR 23 type certification standards, which should simplify and reduce the cost of certifying the C4. If the regulatory changes take too long then the company indicated that it may certify the aircraft in the primary aircraft category instead, even though it would preclude some commercial uses, such as air charter. At this time the first flight of a proof of concept prototype was forecast for the summer of 2014 with certification by the end of 2015.

At the end of March 2014 first flight was scheduled for June 2014 with certification forecast to be completed by the end of 2015. The target price of US$250,000 was still current as well. Further delays, however, pushed the first flight back to a new forecast date of November 2014. The C4 was actually first flown on 9 April 2015. The initial flight data showed that it met its design performance goals and had benign approach to stall characteristics.

In April 2015 the company announced that production of the type would be in the United States.

The company entered receivership in 2016 and the development of the C4 was suspended at that time. The company was purchased in the summer of 2017 by the German company LiftAir. In January 2018, it was announced that the design for be updated to reflect the regulatory and technology changes that had occurred in the intervening eight years since the C4 was conceived and that production would result in up to six aircraft being produced per month in late 2018.

== Design ==
The aircraft is an all-composite design developed from the two-seat Flight Design CT family. The structure will be a carbon, Aramide and glass sandwich structure. The wing will be a one-piece cantilever design. Cabin access will be through two doors, hinged at the front, plus a baggage compartment door. Seating is individual front seats, with a rear folding bench seat. Design engines will be the Continental IO-360-AF of 180 hp (134 kW) and maybe the Thielert Centurion 2.0 turbocharged diesel of 155 hp (116 kW). The propeller will be a composite constant speed type. The C4's design empty weight is 600 kg (1,323 lb), with a gross weight of 1,200 kg (2,646 lb). A full-aircraft Ballistic Recovery Systems parachute system will be standard equipment. In 2014 the Garmin G3X was selected as the aircraft's avionics suite.

Maximum cruise speed will be 296 km/h (160 kn) with the Continental engine and 269 km/h (145 kn) with the Thielert powerplant, although the latter will provide 3,151 km (1,701 nmi) range.

Optional equipment will be available that will allow the aircraft to be used in the glider or banner towing role or on floats. An ice protection system is under consideration by the company for future incorporation into the design.

== Specifications (C4) ==
Data from AvWeb and Company fact Sheet

General characteristics

- Crew: one
- Capacity: three passengers
- Length: 7.876 m (25 ft 10 in)
- Wingspan: 9.930 m (32 ft 7 in)
- Height: 2.611 m (8 ft 7 in)
- Empty weight: 599 kg (1,320 lb)
- Gross weight: 1,197 kg (2,640 lb)
- Fuel capacity: 70 U.S. gallons (260 L; 58 imp gal)
- Powerplant: 1 × Continental IO-360-AF avgas and alternative fuels piston aircraft engine, 130 kW (180 hp)
- Propellers: 3-bladed composite constant speed propeller

Performance

- Cruise speed: 296 km/h (184 mph, 160 kn)
- Stall speed: 93 km/h (58 mph, 50 kn)
- Never exceed speed: 360 km/h (220 mph, 190 kn)
- Range: 3,150 km (1,960 mi, 1,200 nmi) at 65% power; 8.4 USgal/hr (32 L/h), 145 kt
- Endurance: 13:35 maximum
- Rate of climb: 5.0 m/s (980 ft/min)

Avionics

- Garmin G1000
- Dynon SkyView suite
- autopilot
- Traffic collision avoidance system and terrain awareness and warning system

== See also ==
Aircraft of comparable role, configuration, and era

- Diamond DA40
