= São Pedro Airport (Brazil) =

Octavio Moura Andrade Municipal Airport Aeroporto Municipal Octavio Moura Andrade
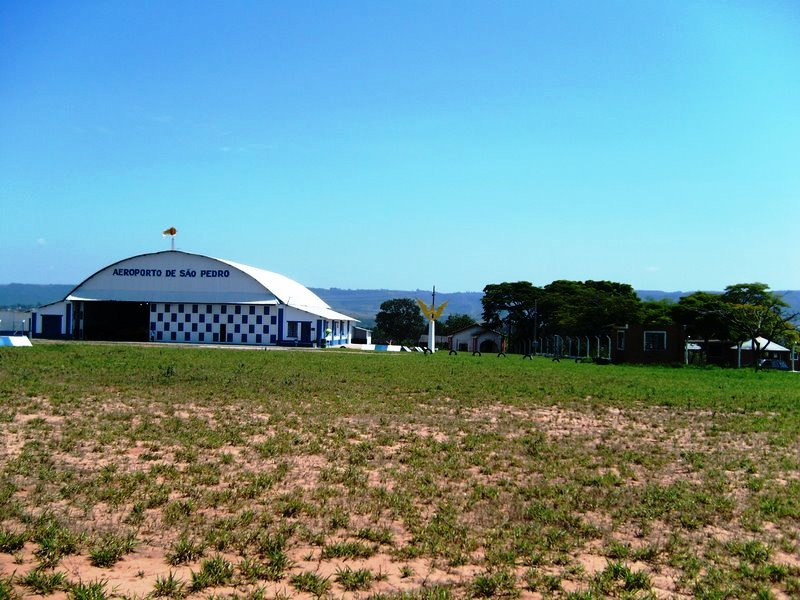
- IATA: none; ICAO: SDAE; LID: SP0053

Summary
- Airport type: Public
- Owner/Operator: São Pedro
- Serves: São Pedro
- Opened: February 6, 1938
- Time zone: BRT (UTC−03:00)
- Elevation AMSL: 566 m (1,857 ft)
- Coordinates: 22°35′01″S 047°53′46″W

Map
- Location within the State of São Paulo Location within Brazil

Runways
Direction	Length		Surface
Direction	m	ft	Surface
14/32	1,000	3,281	Dirt
- Sources: ANAC, DECEA

Octavio Moura Andrade Municipal Airport (ICAO: SDAE), often referred to as São Pedro Airport, is the airport serving São Pedro, Brazil.

It is operated by the Municipality of São Pedro.

== History ==
The construction of the airfield started in 1936 under the initiative of Octavio Moura Andrade, who intended to support the construction of a hotel and for use of its future guests. Later, this hotel would be known as the Grande Hotel in the city of Águas de São Pedro. The airfield was commissioned on 6 February 1938.

On 28 July 1940, the first big event at São Pedro took place: it was organized by Octavio Moura Andrade to pay tribute to his brother Antonio Joaquim de Moura Andrade. Seventy-eight aircraft of flying clubs in the state of São Paulo, and Brazilian Army aircraft based at Campo de Marte Airport and Santos Naval Base attended the celebration.

The second great event at São Pedro was held at the airfield from 19 to 21 April 1947 with the intention of gathering Brazilian aviators to create the União Brasileira de Aviadores Civis (Brazilian Union of Civil Aviators). Several "advertisement squadrons" flew to cities in the country in order to promote the convention. In 1951 Federal Law no. 1,372 and São Paulo State Law no. 1,137 declared the Brazilian Union of Civil Aviators to be of public utility.

The Revoada Pan-Americana (Pan-American Air Raid) was held on the airfield from 17 to 20 August 1950, with approximately 350 aircraft attending to the event, coming from Argentina, Chile, Paraguay, Uruguay, the Brazilian Army and flying clubs. Several aeronautical military exercises such as simulation of bombings and parachuting were performed.

Águas de São Pedro Aerodrome was homologated to public air traffic by Decree no. 002/Department of Civil Aviation/6 January 1971, and the authoritative order was updated by the Decree of the Department of Civil Aviation no. 097/Operations Subdepartment, of 5 March 1996.

The private airport was expropriated by the state government in 1949. In 1996 the State Government donated the aerodrome to the municipality of São Pedro. The airport underwent renovation in 2009, after being interdicted for six years.

On 1 December 2012, the airport was named after its founder.

The airport spans 610,000 m^{2} (6,565,985.35 sq ft), and has only one dirt runway with length of 1,000 metres (3,300 feet), width of 25 metres (82 feet), and resistance of 5600 kg/0.50 mPa. There is no ALS.

Just Fly, a distribution company of the CTLS and MC aircraft models from Flight Design in Brazil has its headquarters in the property. AirBrasil, a hot air ballooning company also operates in the aerodrome.

== Airlines and destinations ==
No scheduled flights operate at this airport.

== Access ==
The airport is located 5 km (3 mi) from downtown São Pedro and 4 kilometres (2 miles) from Águas de São Pedro. It is accessible via highway SP-304.

== See also ==
- List of airports in Brazil
