= Breezer Breezer =

Breezer
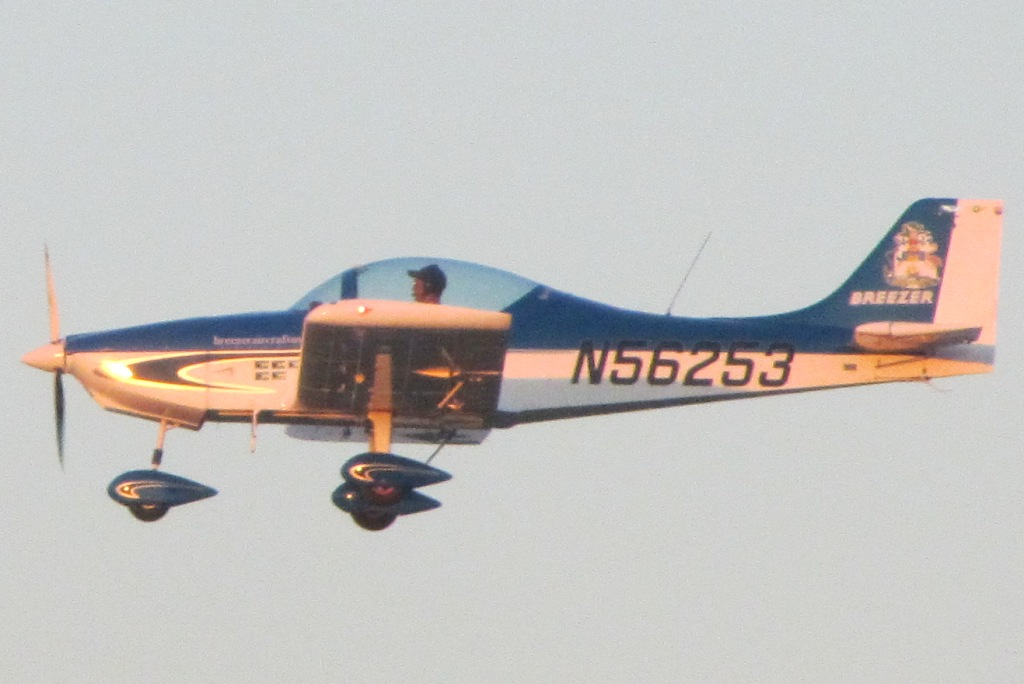

General information
- Type: Two seat ultralight aircraft and light-sport aircraft
- National origin: Germany
- Manufacturer: Breezer Aircraft GmbH, Reussenköge
- Designer: Ralf Magnussen
- Status: In production
- Number built: 120+

History
- First flight: December 1999

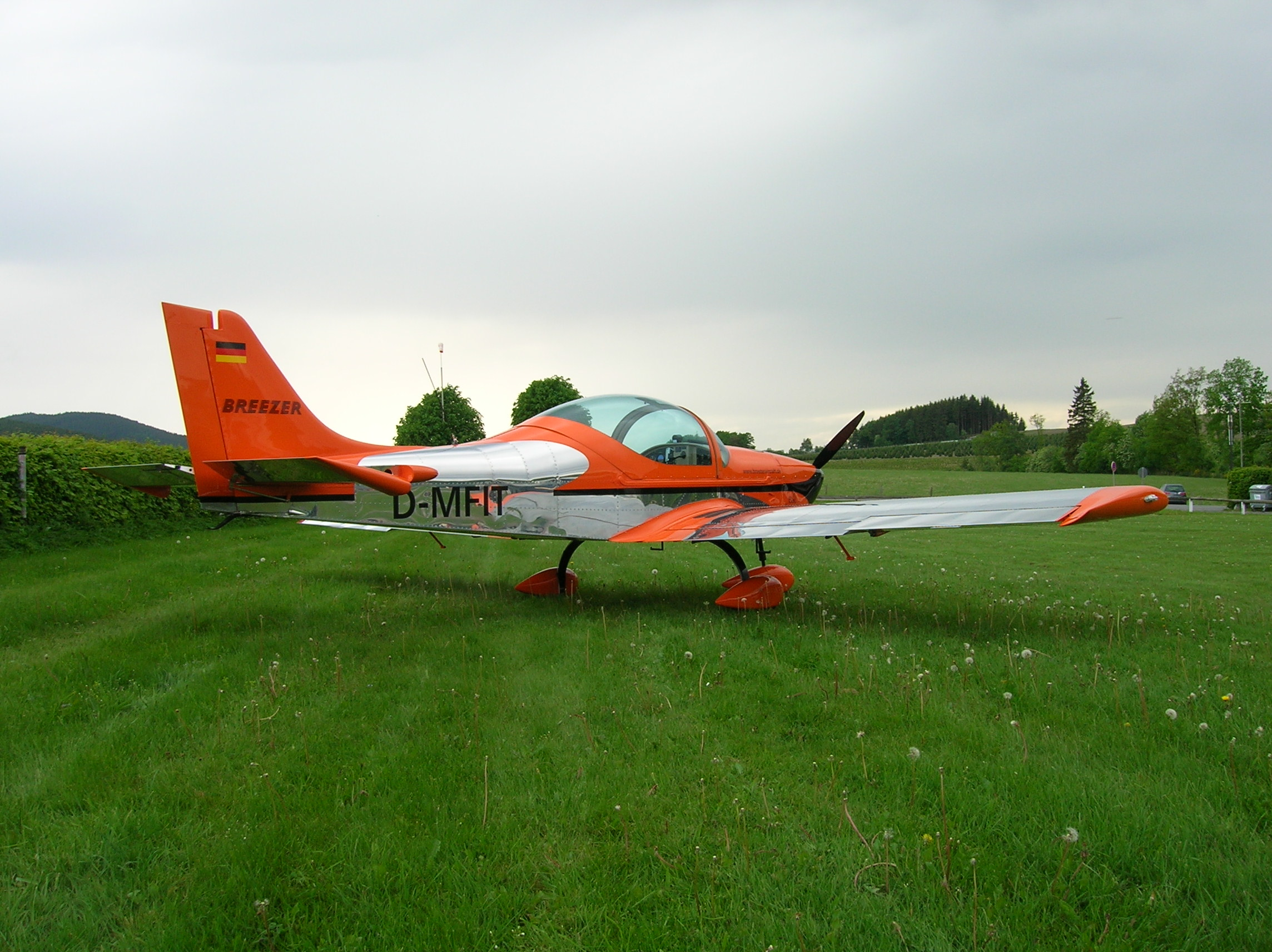
Aerostyle Breezer

The Breezer is a low-wing, single-engine ultralight aircraft, seating two side by side. Designed and built in Germany, it meets both European and US light-sport aircraft requirements and has been in production since 2001.

== Design and development ==
First flown in December 1999, the Breezer is the first product of what, until 2006 when Breezer Aircraft gmbh was formed, was named the Aerostyle Ultraleicht Flugzeuge; it is therefore often known as the Aerostyle Breezer. It is a low wing ultralight, seating two side by side. It is largely constructed of riveted aluminium, with composites only used for non-structural fairings and the undercarriage.

The wings have constant chord and slightly upturned trailing edge tips. Mass balanced, half span Fowler flaps immediately inboard of the ailerons may, as an option, be electrically driven. The fin and rudder are swept and straight edged apart from an initially curved leading edge fillet. The rudder is deep and moves in a cut-out in the separate elevators. The tailplane has constant chord. Both elevators and rudder are horn balanced; there is a trim tab on the port elevator.

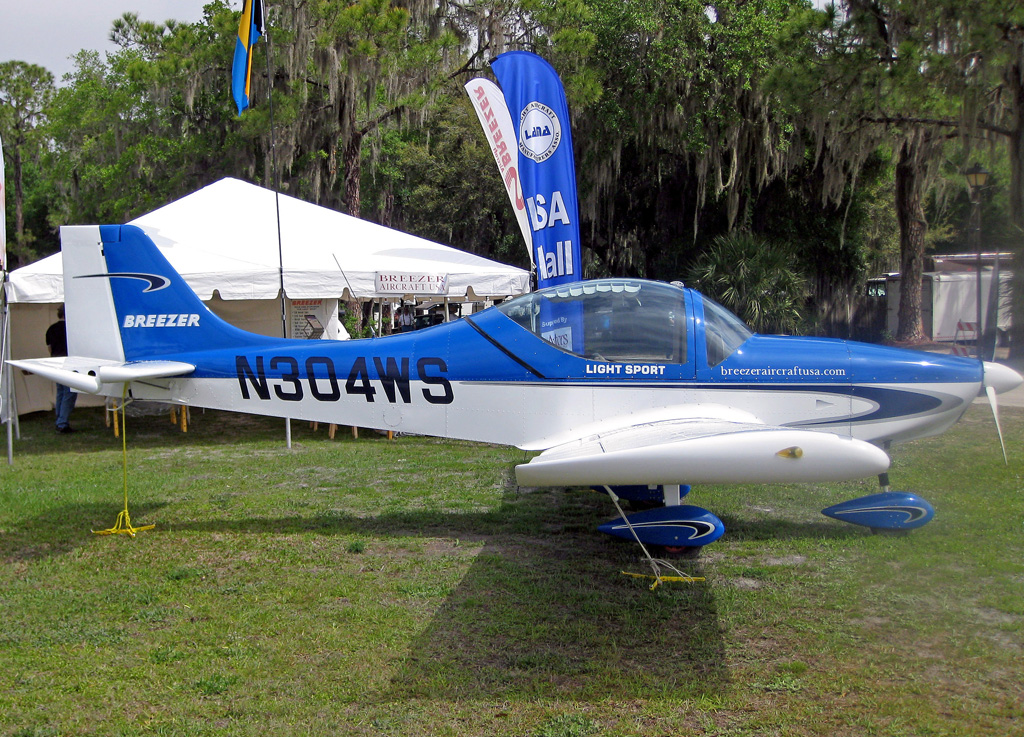
Breezer Light Sport aircraft exhibited at the Sun 'n Fun show at Lakeland Linder International Airport, Florida, in 2011

The cockpit, located over the wings, has a large hinged canopy and fixed separate windscreen. The Breezer has a tricycle undercarriage with spatted wheels mounted on composite sprung cantilever legs fixed to the lower fuselage. The nosewheel is steerable. A ballistic parachute is an option: either a Junkers or a BRS 5UL type may be fitted. A 74 kW (99 hp) Rotax 912 ULS is the standard powerplant but there are other options such as the 60 kW (80 hp) Rotax 912 UL or the Jabiru 2200 and Jabiru 3300 engines of similar power.

One significant modification of the Breezer prototype after its first year of test flying was the incorporation of a steerable nosewheel in place of a castoring type. The Breezer obtained German certification in the Summer of 2001. The first version to be marketed was the Experimental in 2002. Changes since then include strengthening of the canopy and a reduction of span, the latter bringing a small weight saving. In 2005 the Breezer gained LSA approval, being named the Breezer Light Sport, making it suitable for the US market.

The Breezer has been produced both in kit form and as a complete aircraft at a factory in Kamenz.

== Operational history ==
The European registers (excluding Russia) recorded 77 Breezers in mid-2010. Others fly in the US with 7 conforming to light-sport aircraft standards sold by 2008.

== Variants ==
Breezer Experimental
First production version.
Breezer
European Ultralight category. Strengthened canopy from 2008.
Breezer C
Short span wings - 8.03 m (26 ft 4 in)
Light Sport
European version of LSA category, stronger canopy. Static exhibit at Aero '09 show, Friedrichshafen in 2009.
Aerosport Breezer
LSA category version for US, factory built and distributed by Aerosport, Draper, Utah.
Breezer Club
Flying club version, optimised for training etc. Ballistic recovery parachute fitted.
B600
Certified variant that gained an EASA type-certificate in January 2016 to meet the Certification Specification for Light Sport Aeroplanes (CS-LSA). Powered by a Rotax 912 ULS2 engine.

== Specifications (Rotax 912 ULS) ==
Data from Jane's All the World's Aircraft 2010/11 (Weights and performance are estimated)

General characteristics

- Crew: 2
- Length: 6.40 m (21 ft 0 in)
- Wingspan: 8.03 m (26 ft 4 in)
- Height: 2.15 m (7 ft 1 in)
- Wing area: 10.92 m^{2} (117.5 sq ft)
- Airfoil: NACA 4414
- Empty weight: 295 kg (650 lb)
- Max takeoff weight: 600 kg (1,323 lb) where permitted
- Fuel capacity: 70 L (15.4 imp gal, 18.5 US gal) standard
- Powerplant: 1 × Rotax 912 ULS 4-cylinder horizontally opposed, air- and water-cooled, 73.5 kW (98.6 hp)
- Propellers: Neuform T3, pitch ground adjustable

Performance

- Maximum speed: 220 km/h (140 mph, 120 kn)
- Cruise speed: 200 km/h (120 mph, 110 kn) at 75% power
- Stall speed: 65 km/h (40 mph, 35 kn)
- Range: 800 km (500 mi, 430 nmi)
- g limits: +4/-2
- Rate of climb: 6.0 m/s (1,180 ft/min)
