= SAAESP =

Serviço Autônomo de Água e Esgoto de São Pedro (SAAESP)
- Company type: Public
- Industry: Water industry
- Founded: São Pedro, Brazil (June 28, 2002)
- Headquarters: São Pedro, Brazil
- Key people: Thiago Silvério da Silva (Chairman)
- Products: Water; Waste services
- Website: www.saaesp.sp.gov.br

SAAESP (an acronym for Autonomous Service of Water and Sewage of São Pedro; Portuguese: Serviço Autônomo de Água e Esgoto de São Pedro) is a Brazilian state owned utility that provides water and sewage services for residential, commercial and industrial use to the municipality of São Pedro.
