= Flight Design Exxtacy =

German rigid wing hang glider

Exxtacy
- Exxtacy, showing flaps, flares for landing

General information
- Type: Hang glider
- National origin: Germany
- Manufacturer: Flight Design
- Status: Production completed

History
- Introduction date: 1999

The Flight Design Exxtacy is a German high-wing, single or two-place, rigid-wing hang glider that was designed and produced by Flight Design.

Production is complete and the aircraft is no longer available.

== Design and development ==
The Exxtacy was intended as a high-performance rigid-wing hang glider, for competition use and two-place instruction.

The Exxtacy wing is based upon a carbon-fiber-reinforced polymer cantilever box spar, with ribs and wing tips, also of the same material. Control is by weight-shift, with roll control augmented by wing top-surface spoilers. For thermalling flight and landing, inboard flaps were installed. The aircraft achieves a glide ratio of 17.5:1.

The aircraft can be dismantled for ground transport and folds to 5.70 m (18.7 ft) x 0.26 m (0.9 ft) x 0.52 m (1.7 ft).

== Variants ==
Exxtacy 13.5
Single place model. Its 11.4 m (37.4 ft) span wing has a nose angle of 165° and the aspect ratio is 9.4:1. The pilot hook-in weight range is 90 to 140 kg (198 to 309 lb). In 2003 the aircraft sold for €6078. Certified as DHV Class 3.
Exxtacy Biplace
Two place model. Its 12.2 m (40.0 ft) span wing has a nose angle of 165° and the aspect ratio is 10.05:1. The pilot hook-in weight range is 100 to 160 kg (220 to 353 lb). In 2003 the aircraft sold for €6509. Certified as DHV Class 3.

== Aircraft on display ==
- Deutsches Museum Flugwerft Schleissheim

== Specifications (2003 model Exxtacy 13.5) ==
Data from Bertrand and the Deutsches Museum

General characteristics

- Crew: one
- Wingspan: 11.4 m (37 ft 5 in)
- Wing area: 13.8 m^{2} (149 sq ft)
- Aspect ratio: 9.4:1
- Empty weight: 38 kg (84 lb)

Performance

- Maximum glide ratio: 17.5:1
