= São Pedro, São Paulo =

São Pedro
- Municipality
- Municipality of the Touristic Resort of São Pedro; Município da Estância Turística de São Pedro
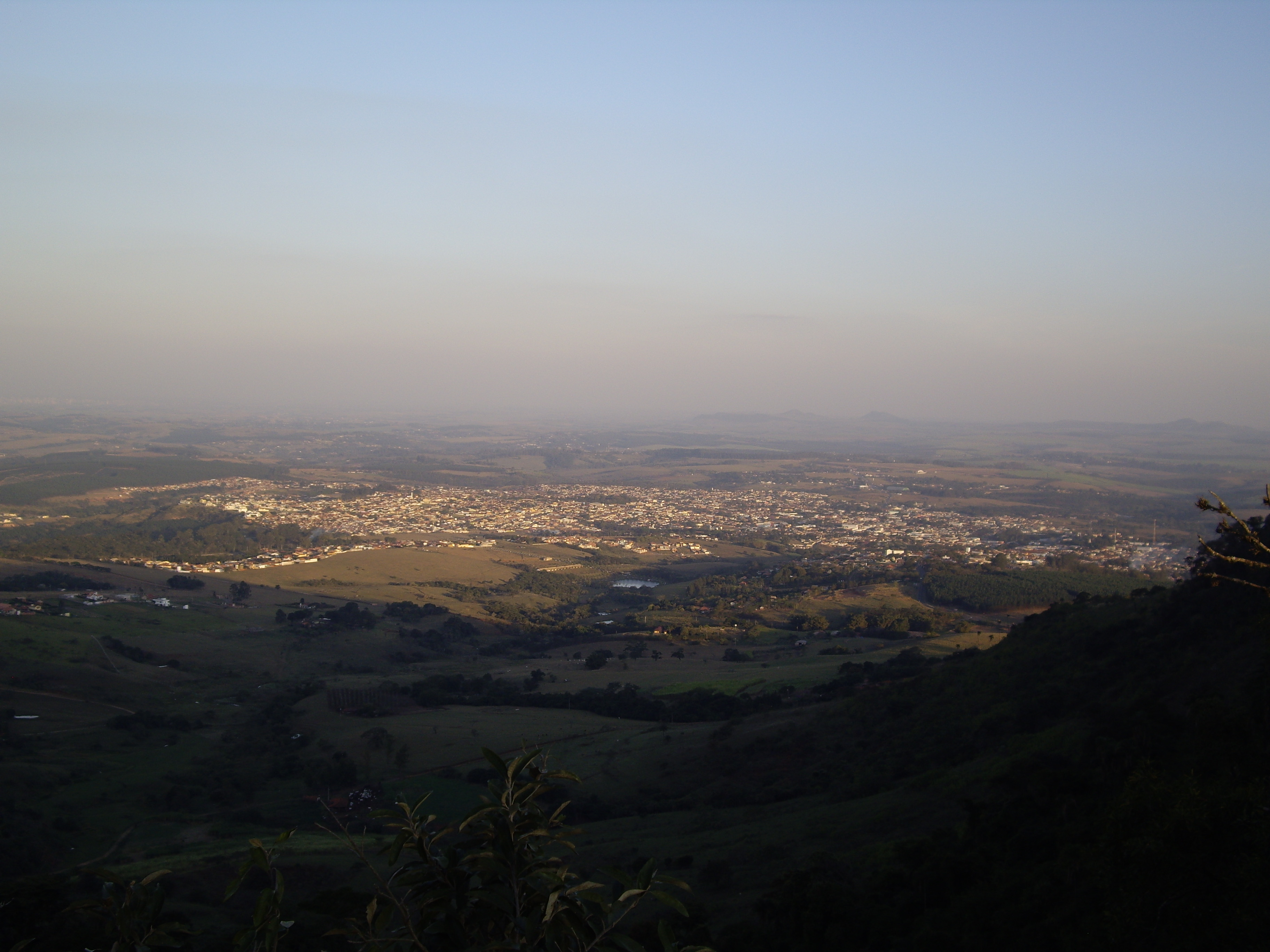
- City as seen near the Christ's Belvedere

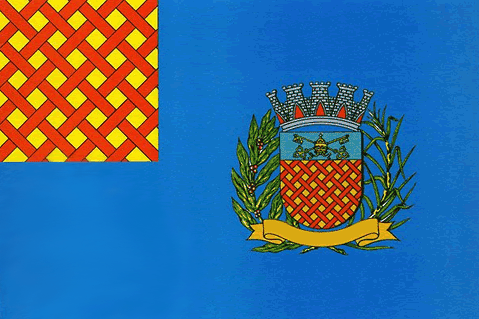
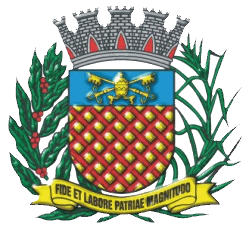
- Flag Coat of arms
- Motto: Fide et labore patriae magnitudo (Latin for With faith and work, we magnify the country)
- Anthem: Exaltação a São Pedro
- Interactive map outlining São Pedro
- Location within the State of São Paulo Location within Brazil Location within South America
- Coordinates: 22°32′55″S 47°54′50″W
- Country: Brazil
- Region: Southeast
- State: São Paulo
- Named for: Saint Peter

Government
  - Mayor: Thiago Silva (PSDB)
  - City council: Members: Adilson de Jesus (PROS); Adriano Vitor de Oliveira (SD); Albino Antunes (PPS); Antonio Benedito Ferraz Toledo (PSL); Carlos Eduardo Oliveira (PSB); Cássio Hellmeister Capellari (DEM); Elias Garcia Candeias (PP); Gilberto Vieira de Macêdo (PDT); Giuliano Giocondo Ghirotti Antonelli (PSB); Joyce Nottingham Benevides Siloto (PV); Luiz Fernando Gomes Altos (PSDB); Ondina Daniel (PSD); Roberson Pedrosa de Oliveira (PSL)

Area
  - Total: 611.278 km^{2} (236.016 sq mi)
- Elevation: 561.01 m (1,840.6 ft)

Population (2020)
  - Total: 35,980
  - Rank: 988th, Brazil
  - Density: 51.98/km^{2} (134.6/sq mi)
- Demonym: são-pedrense

Ethnicity
  - White: 77.61% (24,572 inhabitants)
  - Brown: 19.63% (6,216 inhabitants)
  - Black: 2.29% (724 inhabitants)
  - Yellow: 0.39% (124 inhabitants)
  - Indian: 0.08% (26 inhabitants)
- Time zone: UTC-3 (BRT)
  - Summer (DST): UTC-2 (BRST)
- Postal code: 13520-000
- Area code: 19
- HDI (2010): 0.755 – high
- Website: www.saopedro.sp.gov.br

São Pedro is a municipality in the state of São Paulo in Brazil. The population is of 35,980 (2020) in an area of 611.278 km^{2} (236.02 sq mi).

== History ==
The brothers Joaquim, José and Luiz Teixeira de Barros, who came from Itu, bought the Pinheiros Sesmaria where São Pedro is today. They brought with them: slaves, employees and family members. The Picadão, a road that led from São Paulo to Cuiabá, passed through this same area and where the historic center is today was the so-called Pouso do Pidadão, which was looked after by the cattle driver Floriano de Costa Pereira, known as Florianão.

Of the Teixeira de Barros brothers, Joaquim was considered the "settler" and, as was customary, he built a small chapel whose patron saint was Saint Sebastian. Authorized by the Catholic Church, it was given the name Capela do Picadão.

The name and patron saint did not please the population and it was soon changed to Capela de São Pedro. The fertility of the land attracted other families, and in 1864 the settlement was elevated to the status of Parish. In 1867, the first priest, Father Aurélio Votta, an Italian, arrived. In 1879, the Baron of Iguape, Captain Veríssimo Antônio da Silva Prado, who settled here as a farmer, managed to raise the status of a town. Later, in 1881, he managed to separate Piracicaba from the city and, in 1882, to the district, and the first judge, João Baptista Pinto de Toledo, arrived.

The Italian immigration period of 1890 and the production of coffee gave the municipality a boost.

The railroad branch arrived in 1893. During this coffee period, the Santa Casa de Misericórdia, cemetery, school, jail, city hall and chamber were established, in addition to the main church.

In the 1920s, the search for oil discovered water sources and the beginning of Termas de São Pedro, today Águas de São Pedro, which was emancipated in the 1940s. Around 1934, the then directors of Companhia Petróleos do Brasil, created by Monteiro Lobato in 1931, Ângelo Balloni and Vittorio Miglieta, coordinated the installation of the Balloni II well, which became a landmark for being considered the deepest drilled well reached in Brazil (1,815 m). The rig remains in place to this day.

== Geography ==
=== Climate ===
According to the Köppen climate classification São Pedro has a tropical savanna climate.

Climate data for São Pedro, São Paulo
Month	Jan	Feb	Mar	Apr	May	Jun	Jul	Aug	Sep	Oct	Nov	Dec	Year
Mean daily maximum °C (°F)	30.3 (86.5)	30.4 (86.7)	30.0 (86.0)	28.4 (83.1)	26.4 (79.5)	25.2 (77.4)	25.5 (77.9)	27.7 (81.9)	28.6 (83.5)	29.1 (84.4)	29.6 (85.3)	29.6 (85.3)	28.4 (83.1)
Daily mean °C (°F)	24.6 (76.3)	24.8 (76.6)	24.2 (75.6)	22.0 (71.6)	19.7 (67.5)	18.4 (65.1)	18.2 (64.8)	20.0 (68.0)	21.5 (70.7)	22.6 (72.7)	23.3 (73.9)	23.9 (75.0)	21.9 (71.4)
Mean daily minimum °C (°F)	18.9 (66.0)	19.1 (66.4)	18.4 (65.1)	15.7 (60.3)	13.0 (55.4)	11.6 (52.9)	11.0 (51.8)	12.4 (54.3)	14.4 (57.9)	16.1 (61.0)	17.0 (62.6)	18.3 (64.9)	15.5 (59.9)
Average precipitation mm (inches)	221.5 (8.72)	191.2 (7.53)	149.2 (5.87)	71.8 (2.83)	62.3 (2.45)	44.1 (1.74)	26.7 (1.05)	27.1 (1.07)	64.3 (2.53)	124.0 (4.88)	133.5 (5.26)	191.8 (7.55)	1,307.5 (51.48)
Source: Center for Meteorological and Climatic Researches Applied to Agriculture

== Parks and recreation ==
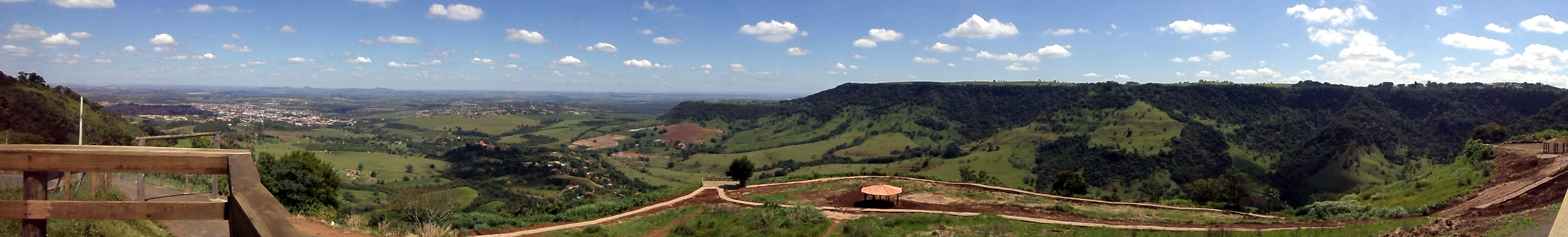
View of the city from Marcelo Golinelli Eco-touristic Park.

== Infrastructure ==
=== Transportation ===
The city is served by São Pedro Airport.

=== Utilities ===
Water is provided by the Autonomous Service of Water and Sewage of São Pedro (SAAESP).

== Media ==
In telecommunications, the city was served by Companhia Telefônica Brasileira until 1973, when it began to be served by Telecomunicações de São Paulo. In July 1998, this company was acquired by Telefónica, which adopted the Vivo brand in 2012.

The company is currently an operator of cell phones, fixed lines, internet (fiber optics/4G) and television (satellite and cable).

== Religion ==
Christianity is present in the city as follows:

=== Catholic Church ===
The Catholic church in the municipality is part of the Roman Catholic Diocese of Piracicaba.

=== Protestant Church ===
The most diverse evangelical beliefs are present in the city, mainly Pentecostal, including the Assemblies of God in Brazil (the largest evangelical church in the country), Christian Congregation in Brazil, among others. These denominations are growing more and more throughout Brazil.

== See also ==
- List of municipalities in São Paulo
