= List of mayors of Águas de São Pedro =

This is a listing of all those that have served as the Mayor of the municipality of Águas de São Pedro in the Brazilian state of São Paulo.

Number	Name	Starting date of Office	Ending date of Office	Political Party	Status
1	Carlos Mauro	April 19, 1949	June 18, 1951		Official Mayor
2	Angelo Nogueira Vila	June 19, 1951	June 18, 1952		Official Mayor
3	Geraldo Vieira Azevedo	June 19, 1952	November 15, 1954		Official Mayor
4	Armando Brandini	November 16, 1954	February 15, 1955		Official Mayor
5	Eugênio Scaranello Pires	February 16, 1955	April 15, 1957		Official Mayor
6	José Antonio Gomes Coelho	April 16, 1957	November 14, 1958		Official Mayor
7	Armando Brandini	November 15, 1958	October 10, 1962		Official Mayor
8	Antonio de Pádua Aguiar	October 7, 1962	November 11, 1966		Official Mayor
9	João José Possato (Note: He was the mayor in the absence of Armando Brandini.)	November 17, 1966	November 25, 1966		Acting Mayor
10	Armando Brandini	November 11, 1966	September 29, 1968		Official Mayor
11	Wilson Modesto (Note: He was the vice mayor of Armando Brandini, and acted as mayor since mid-1968. Mayor Brandini died in December 13, 1968, and Modesto remained in office.)	September 30, 1968	November 23, 1968		Acting Mayor
12	João José Possato	November 24, 1968	August 6, 1970		Official Mayor
13	Angelo Nogueira Vila	August 7, 1975	May 9, 1979		Official Mayor
14	João José Possato	May 10, 1979	January 31, 1983	ARENA	Official Mayor
15	Leonardo Belmiro	February 1, 1983	December 31, 1988	PDS	Official Mayor
16	Luiz Antonio de Mitry Filho	January 1, 1989	December 31, 1992	PMDB	Official Mayor
17	Paulo Cesar Borges	January 1, 1993	December 31, 1996	PFL	Official Mayor
18	Luiz Antonio de Mitry Filho	January 1, 1997	December 31, 2000	PRP	Official Mayor
19	Luiz Antonio de Mitry Filho	January 1, 2001	December 30, 2003	PTB	Official Mayor
20	Marcelo da Silva Bueno (Note: Took office during the term of former mayor, who resigned due to allegations of corruption. He was elected to the office later.)	December 31, 2003	December 31, 2004	PTB	Acting Mayor
21	Marcelo da Silva Bueno	January 1, 2005	December 31, 2008	PTB	Official Mayor
22	Paulo Cesar Borges	January 1, 2009	December 31, 2012	PSDB	Official Mayor
23	Paulo Cesar Borges	January 1, 2013	December 31, 2016	PSDB	Official Mayor
24	Paulo Sergio Barboza de Lima	January 1, 2017	December 31, 2020	PSDB	Official Mayor
25	João Victor Barboza	January 1, 2021	present	Cidadania	Official Mayor

== See also ==
- Mayors in Brazil
