= Flight Design CT =

German family of light aircraft

CT series
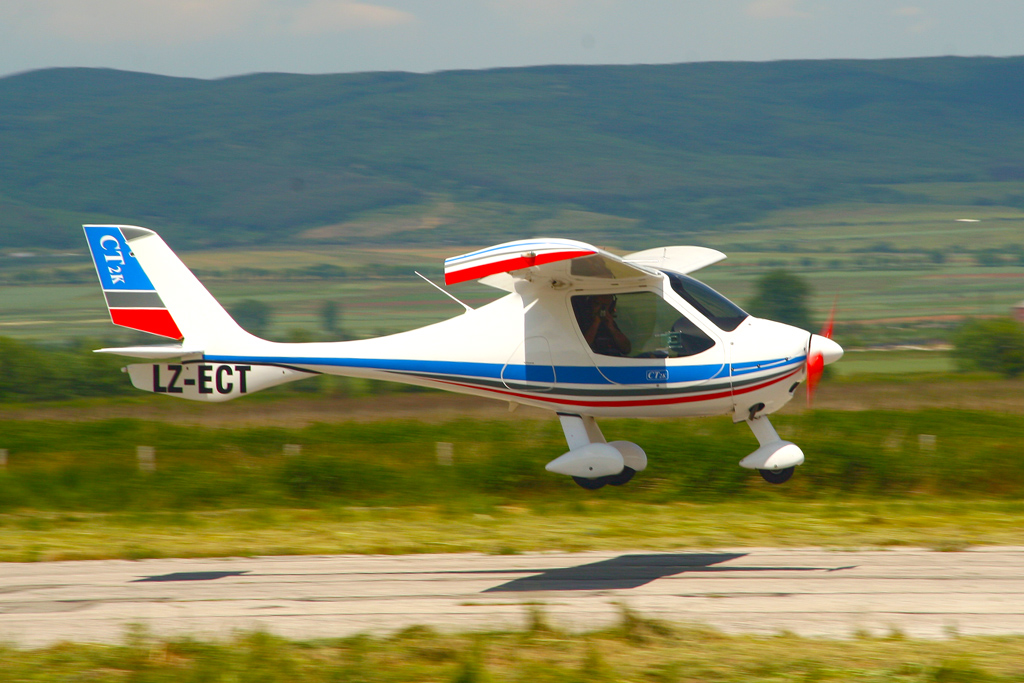
- CT2K

General information
- Type: Microlight/Ultralight
- Manufacturer: Flight Design
- Designer: Matthias Betsch
- Status: In production
- Number built: 900+

History
- Manufactured: 1997–present
- Introduction date: 1997
- First flight: March 1996
- Variant: Flight Design MC

The Flight Design CT series is a family of high-wing, tricycle undercarriage, two seat, ultralight and light-sport aircraft produced by Flight Design (Flightdesign Vertrieb) of Germany. The family includes the original CT and the CT2K, CTSW, CTLS and the MC models.

The maiden flight of the original CT model was performed in March 1996, quantity production of the type commenced during the following year at Flight Design's facility in Ukraine. Since its introduction, numerous variants of the CT series have been introduced, a total of 400 aircraft were reportedly in use worldwide by 2005. During 2015, in response to rising demand for the type, Flight Design opted to construct a new manufacturing facility in China to produce the type.

== Development ==
The development of the CT series commenced during the mid-1990s, with work on the programme starting only a few years after the founding of Flight Design in 1993. Prior to the CT series, the firm specialised in the design and production of light aircraft, such as hang gliders and powered microlights. The original model, the CT, was specifically designed for the ultralight-microlight (UL-ML) market, and was certified as such by the EASA, enabling the type's sale throughout the European market. While the manufacturer itself is headquartered in Stuttgart, Germany, the company decided early on to locate the CT's production line in Ukraine. In 1997, the same year in which quantity production of the CT series commenced, Flight Design opted to cease manufacture of its other product ranges in favour of concentrating its resources on its newly launched aircraft.

During the late 1990s and 2000s, numerous variants of the original CT were introduced, turning the type into a family of lightweight aircraft. By 2005, both the improved CT-2K and the CT-SW (the latter featuring a shortened wing), had been launched. During April 2005, the CT-SW was approved by the FAA under a light-sport aircraft (LSA) certification, enabling the type to enter the lucrative North American market. At this point, all aircraft for this market were being imported in a partially-complete state and assembled by the American light aircraft manufacturer Flightstar Sportplanes prior to sale. The type is capable of use within Germany's UL-ML category, albeit requiring a reduction in fuel load and the mandatory installation of a Ballistic Recovery Systems (BRS) parachute. By mid-2005, a total of 400 CT series aircraft had been sold worldwide according to Flight Design, resulting in a production backlog of roughly one year while production of the type proceeded at a reported rate of ten aircraft per month.

By 2011, the CT series had been cleared for flight under the microlight/ultralight regulations of numerous countries, including the FAA's LSA rules, Canadian advanced ultralight and the European EASA Permit to Fly rules. During December 2009, the CTLS was granted a type design approval and a production certificate by the Civil Aviation Administration of China; six years later, a CTLS production plant was constructed in China.

== Design ==
The CT series was designed for the principal roles of recreational flying, touring and towing; other roles envisaged for the aircraft include light reconnaissance and surveillance. It is reportedly due to these secondary roles that much of the aircraft's configuration was selected, such as its high-mounted wing, relatively large windows and detachable doors; the latter feature provides unrestricted views for downward-pointing cameras. Further aspects of the design that improve the pilot's field of view include the aircraft's sizable overhead skylight that reduces the typical blindspot incurred by a high-mounted wing. The pod-shaped cockpit is relatively spacious even for a crew of two.

The wing comprises a symmetrical aerofoil and cantilever construction, which was designed in-house by Flight Design. It has an aspect ratio is akin to that of a glider, and is equipped with relatively oversized flaps to generate a high level of lift when required, as well as a pair of integral wing tanks to house all of the aircraft's fuel. The CT series features an all-composite construction, the primary material being carbon fiber mixed with Kevlar, the latter being added for strengthening. The use of composites has been attributed with enabling the use of a highly aerodynamically shaped fuselage, in addition to a relatively high useful payload capacity (almost equal to the weight of the aircraft itself). Furthermore, by using composites over a metal approach results in higher costs both to manufacture and repair while providing superior strength and crash-resistance.

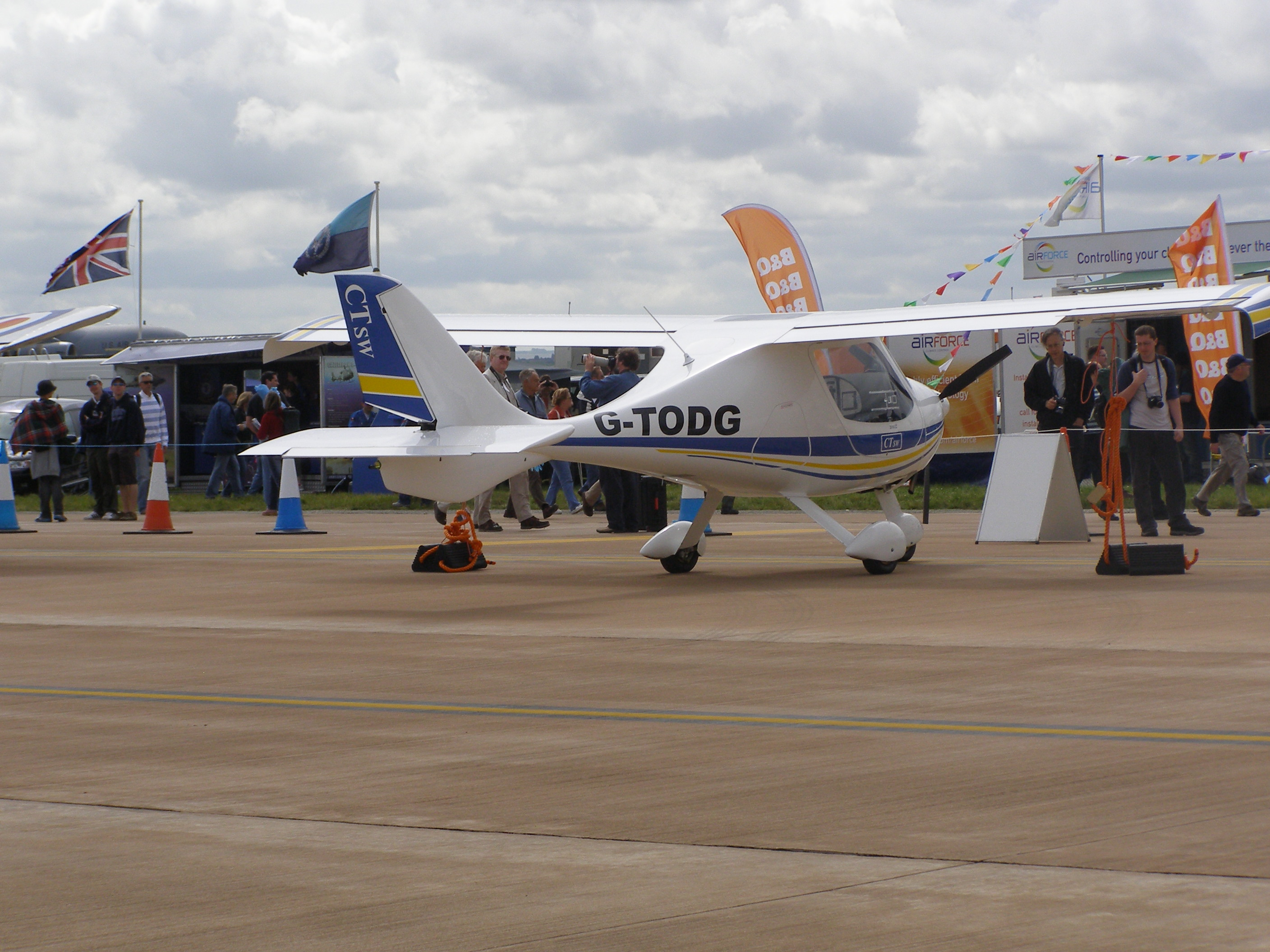
A CTSW on static display at RIAT 2007

All of the CT series are powered by either a single 80 hp (60 kW) Rotax 912UL or 100 hp (75 kW) Rotax 912ULS engine, which is installed in a conventional tractor configuration. Typically, the engine drives a three-bladed fixed-pitch propeller, as well as a single generator for powering onboard electrical apparatus. Electrical systems include the flight instrumentation, VHF radio, a transponder, GPS navigation system, and the electrically actuated flaps, the latter having five positions to select for cruise, take-off, and landing. The instrumentation panel features four standard flight instruments, while additional indicators can be optionally installed at the customer's request. Climate control of cockpit is achieved via ducted engine air for heating while louvers provide both cooling and ventilation.

The flight controls are connected via rods to the ailerons and all-moving horizontal stabiliser, while the rudder is actuated via cables. All three control surfaces can be trimmed via manually operated trim wheels located on the console. Aerospace periodical Flight International has described the CT series as possessing good control characteristics, noting its particularly favourable qualities across aspects such as control response, mechanical characteristics, and harmonisation. One reviewer of the CT2K writing COPA Flight in October 2004 described the aircraft as "fast, comfortable, roomy and very capable of long cross country flights for little money" and faulted the aircraft only for its difficulty slowing down from its cruise speed of 130 knots to its final approach speed of 50 knots, requiring careful planning to lose 80 knots between entering the circuit and stabilizing the aircraft on final approach.

Although the standard and required equipment varies by country, the CTSW features a standard Ballistic Recovery Systems (BRS) parachute. The BRS can be used to lower the entire aircraft to the ground via a controlled descent in the event of major structural failure, incapacitation of the pilot, or engine failure over mountainous terrain. The recovery parachute is operated via a handle installed on the rear cabin wall, which is also linked to a fuselage-mounted emergency location transmitter to further aid in recovery efforts. Another novel feature, which is only present on some variants such as the CT-SW model, is a relatively simplistic "wing-levelling" autopilot; use of this system enables the pilot to conduct limited hands-free/head-in cockpit tasks.

== Operational history ==
During 2007, a single example was used by the Indian Air Force to conduct an around-the-world expedition. Wing Commander Rahul Monga started off on 1 June 2007 and finished the circumnavigation flight on 19 August 2007; a cumulative flight time of 247 hours was logged for the journey.

During 2010, the Air Volunteer Fire Department in Bomberos de Cuenca, Ecuador took delivery of a CTLS for use as an air support unit for fire fighting reconnaissance. The aircraft is based at Mariscal La Mar airport, 8,300 feet above sea level.

By June 2012, there were 344 CT series aircraft registered in the United States, along with a further 76 in the United Kingdom and 18 in Canada .

== Variants ==
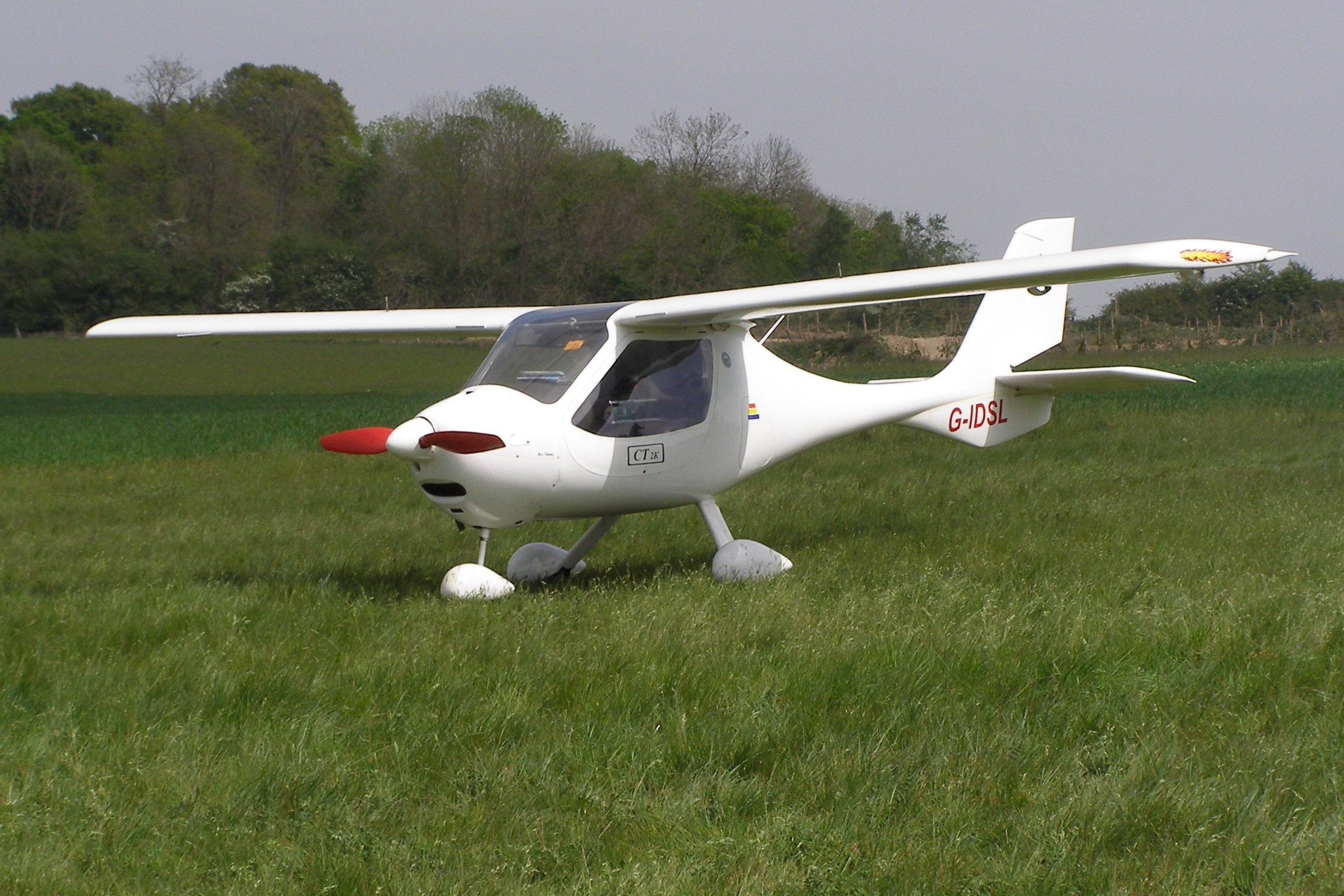
CT2K

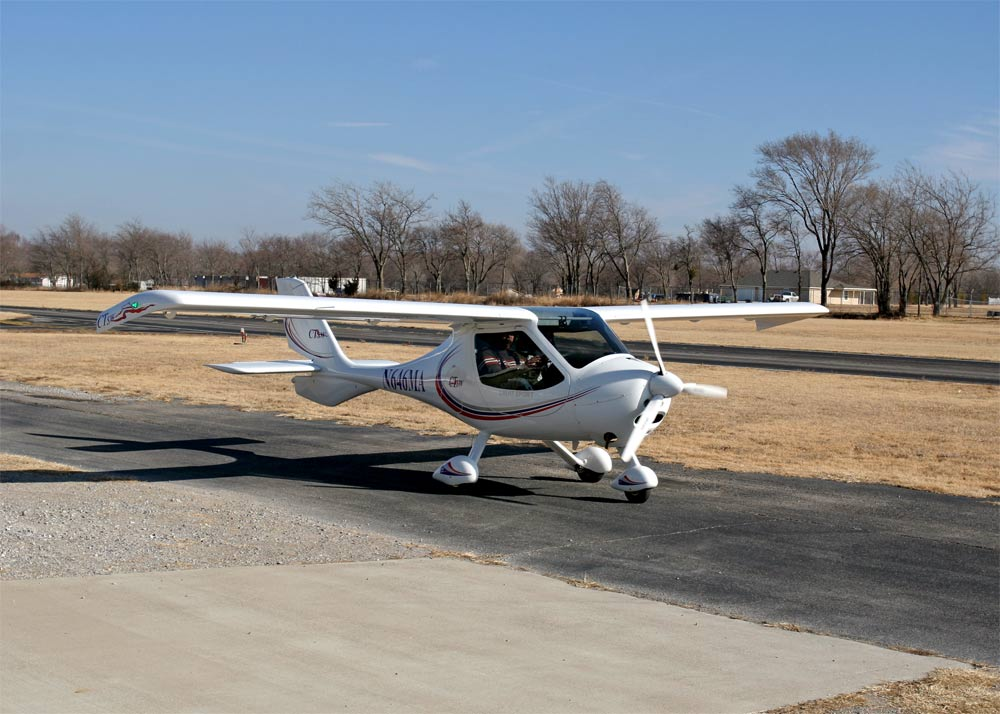
CTSW

CT
Composite Technology – original model, production commenced in 1997. No longer in production.
CT2K
Improved second generation model introduced in 1999 for the year 2000 (2K) to comply with UK microlight regulations, BCAR Section S No longer in production.
CTSW
Short Wing version of the CT2K with a shorter wingspan and redesigned wingtips, giving higher cruise speeds while maintaining similar stall speeds. Remained in production in 2017.
CTLS
Light Sport version, announced in 2008. It improves on the CTSW in several areas, including a revised fuel system (improved fuel venting and standard-type fuel caps), a revised tailplane and upgraded landing gear as well as aerodynamic improvements. Remained in production in 2020.
MC
Metal Concept is a CT-LS fabricated predominantly from steel tubing and aluminium and intended for the flight training market. Introduced in July 2008, the MC has a lower cockpit sill for easier entry, is 5–7 knots slower than the LS, has 50 lb (23 kg) less useful load and 500 mi (805 km) less range. Remained in production in 2017.
CTLS-Lite
CTLS with reduced features, lower empty weight and price US$20,000 lower. Introduced at Sun 'n Fun 2010. No longer in production.
CTHL
High Lift variant for glider towing and floatplane use, announced at Sun 'n Fun 2010. It will be equipped with a turbocharged 115 hp (86 kW) Rotax 914 powerplant, a 12% greater wing area, a larger stabilator and a full-aircraft parachute all as standard equipment. The price is forecast to be US$14,000 higher than the CTLS No longer in production.
CTLE
Law Enforcement model introduced in 2011 with stabilized camera mount underneath the wing for police surveillance aircraft use. Remained in production in 2017.
CTLSi
Version of the CTLS introduced in 2012 and powered by a Rotax 912 iS engine of 100 hp (75 kW). This fuel-injected engine reduces fuel consumption by 21% compared to the carbureted versions. The model has a $12,800 higher price, but that includes the new engine, electric trim and a lithium ion battery. Remained in production in 2017.
CT Supralight
Model for the Fédération Aéronautique Internationale microlight category, with a gross weight of 472.5 kg (1,042 lb). The standard engines for this version are 80 hp (60 kW) Rotax 912UL, the 100 hp (75 kW) Rotax 912ULS and the 115 hp (86 kW) Rotax 914 four-stroke powerplants. Remained in production in 2017.
F2
Model introduced in 2020, designed specifically for flight training as well as private owners. Upgrades include electric seats, safety airbags, and other improvements while still using the Rotax engine and a composite airframe. It was accepted as an American special light-sport aircraft in July 2021. The aircraft was type certified by EASA under CS 23 on 8 December 2021.
F2e
Electric aircraft model of the F2, introduced in 2020, with a Rolls-Royce or Siemens electric motor.

== Operators ==
=== Military and government operators ===
Ecuador

- Cuenca Fire Department

Indonesia

- Provincial Government of Aceh

== Specifications (CTSW) ==
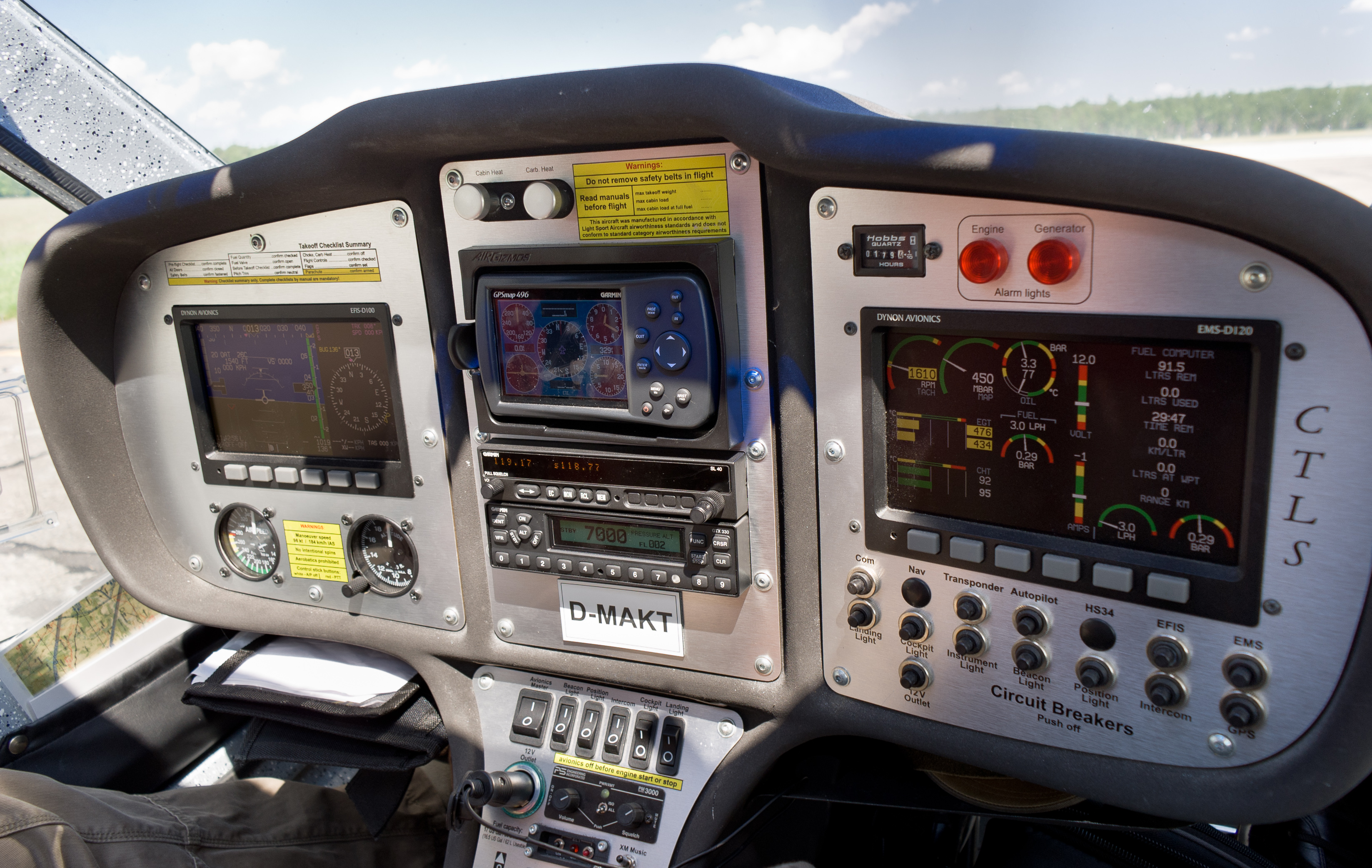
CTLS cockpit

Data from Flight Design

General characteristics

- Crew: 1
- Capacity: 1 passenger + 50 kg (110 lb) baggage
- Length: 6.22 m (20 ft 5 in)
- Wingspan: 8.50 m (27 ft 11 in)
- Height: 2.15 m (7 ft 1 in)
- Wing area: 9.94 m^{2} (107.0 sq ft)
- Empty weight: 318 kg (701 lb)
- Gross weight: 472.5 kg (1,042 lb)
- Max takeoff weight: 600 kg (1,323 lb)
- Fuel capacity: 126 L (28 imp gal), 120 L (26 imp gal) usable
- Powerplant: 1 × Rotax 912S 4-cylinder, 4-stroke liquid/air-cooled engine, 75 kW (101 hp)

Performance

- Maximum speed: 230 km/h (140 mph, 120 kn)
- Cruise speed: 207 km/h (129 mph, 112 kn)
- Stall speed: 65 km/h (40 mph, 35 kn)
- Never exceed speed: 301 km/h (187 mph, 163 kn)
- Range: 2,000 km (1,200 mi, 1,100 nmi)
- Service ceiling: 7,620 m (25,000 ft) planned increase to 9,140 m (30,000 ft)
- Rate of climb: 4.9 m/s (960 ft/min)
- Wing loading: 61 kg/m^{2} (12 lb/sq ft)
- Power/mass: 0.076 hp/lb (0.120 kW/kg)

== See also ==
Aircraft of comparable role, configuration, and era

- 3Xtrim 3X55 Trener
- Evektor SportStar
- Ikarus C42
- Pipistrel Alpha Trainer
- Remos GX
- Tecnam P2008
- Tecnam P2004 Bravo
