= Flight Design MC =

German light-sport aircraft

MC
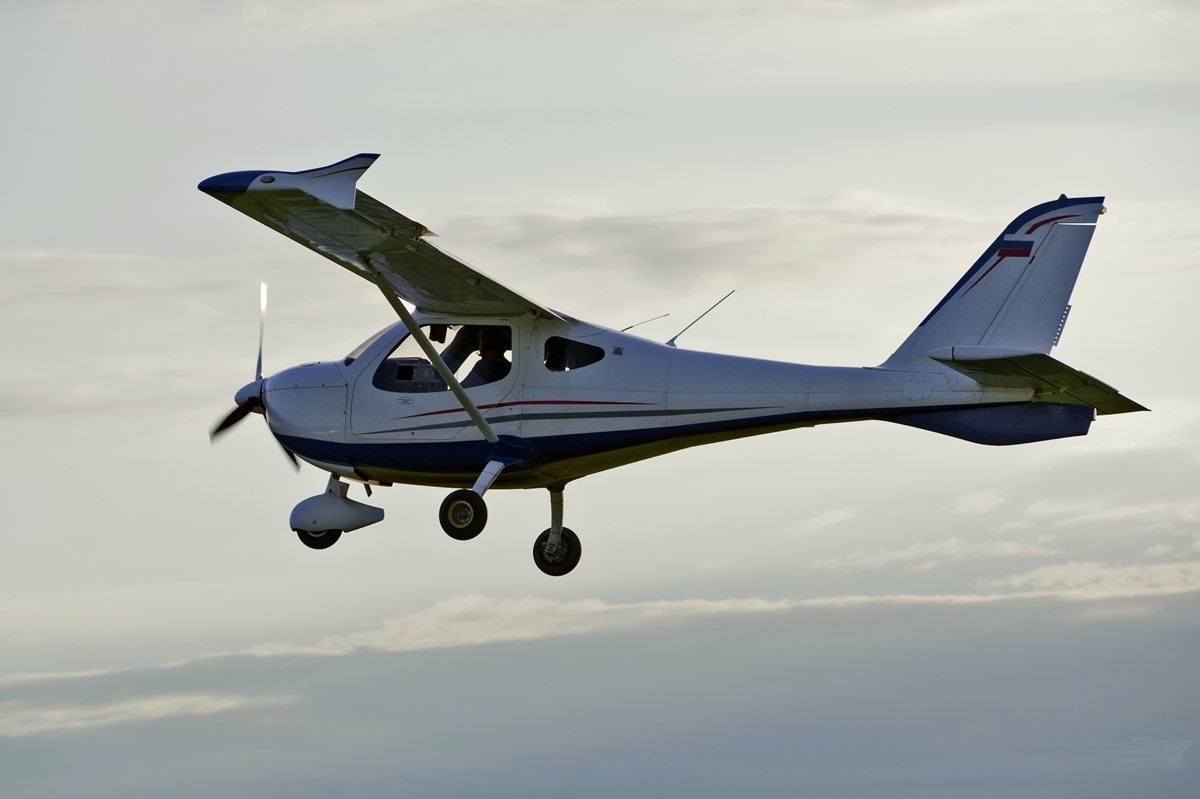

General information
- Type: Light-sport aircraft
- National origin: Germany
- Manufacturer: Flight Design
- Status: In production

History
- Introduction date: 2008
- Developed from: Flight Design CTSW

The Flight Design MC (Metal Concept) is a German light-sport aircraft, designed and produced by Flight Design, introduced at AirVenture in 2008. The aircraft is supplied as a complete ready-to-fly-aircraft.

== Design and development ==
The MC design was based on the general shape of the CT series, but rendered in metal and with a strut-braced wing, in place of the CT series' composite construction and cantilever wing. The design goal was to provide a more robust design, primarily for flight school use. The resulting MC has a lower cruise speed as well as less payload and range than the comparable Flight Design CTLW.

The MC was designed to comply with US light-sport aircraft rules. It features a strut-braced high-wing, a two-seats-in-side-by-side configuration enclosed cockpit, fixed tricycle landing gear and a single engine in tractor configuration.

The MC's structure is totally different from the CT series. Aircraft fuselage is made from welded steel tubing forming a safety cage around the cockpit, with crumple zones built in. The wings and tail are predominantly aluminum sheet. Its 9.5 m (31.2 ft) has an area of 11.3 m^{2} (122 sq ft) and flaps. The landing gear legs are composite and are adapted from the CTLS. To simplify fuel management the wing fuel tanks all feed via a single lever fuel supply system. A ballistic parachute is standard equipment. Standard engines available are the 80 hp (60 kW) Rotax 912UL and the 100 hp (75 kW) Rotax 912ULS and Rotax 912iS four-stroke powerplants.

== Variants ==
MCi
Version with the Rotax 912iS 100 hp (75 kW) engine.

== Specifications (MC) ==
Data from Bayerl

General characteristics

- Crew: one
- Capacity: one passenger
- Wingspan: 9.5 m (31 ft 2 in)
- Wing area: 11.3 m^{2} (122 sq ft)
- Empty weight: 360 kg (794 lb)
- Gross weight: 600 kg (1,323 lb)
- Fuel capacity: 100 litres (22 imp gal; 26 US gal)
- Powerplant: 1 × Rotax 912UL four cylinder, liquid and air-cooled, four stroke aircraft engine, 60 kW (80 hp)

Performance

- Maximum speed: 220 km/h (140 mph, 120 kn)
- Cruise speed: 210 km/h (130 mph, 110 kn)
- Stall speed: 65 km/h (40 mph, 35 kn)
- Rate of climb: 5 m/s (980 ft/min)
