= Flight Design =

German aircraft manufacturer

Flight Design General Aviation GmbH
- Type: Limited company
- Industry: Aerospace
- Founded: 1988
- Founder: Matthias Betsch
- Headquarters: Eisenach, Germany
- Number of locations: 2
- Key people: Daniel Guenther, Managing Director (2019-current)
- Products: Light aircraft, hang gliders, paragliders
- Parent: Lift Air
- Divisions: Flight Design Ukraine
- Website: www.flightdesign.com

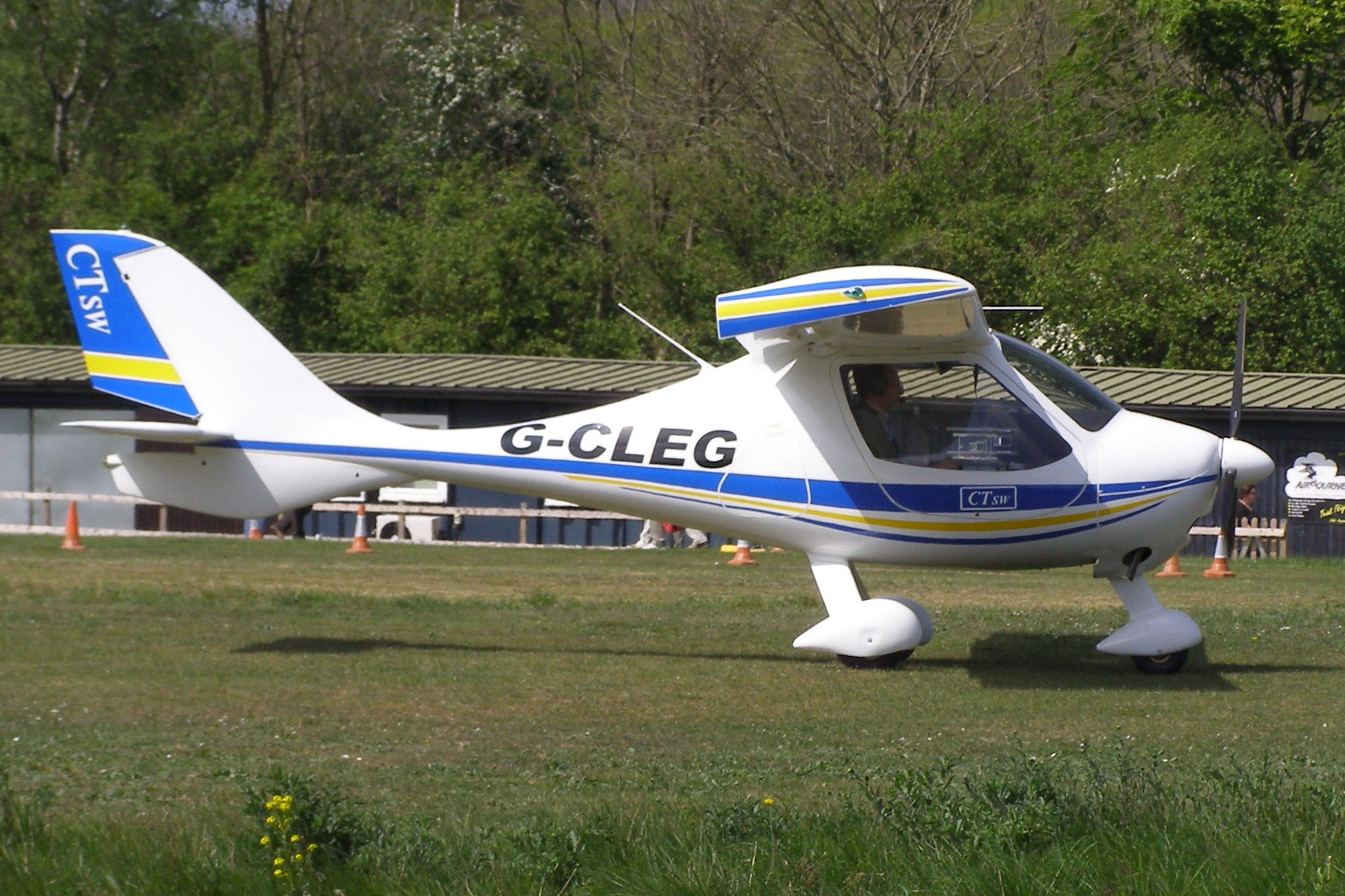
Flight Design CTSW

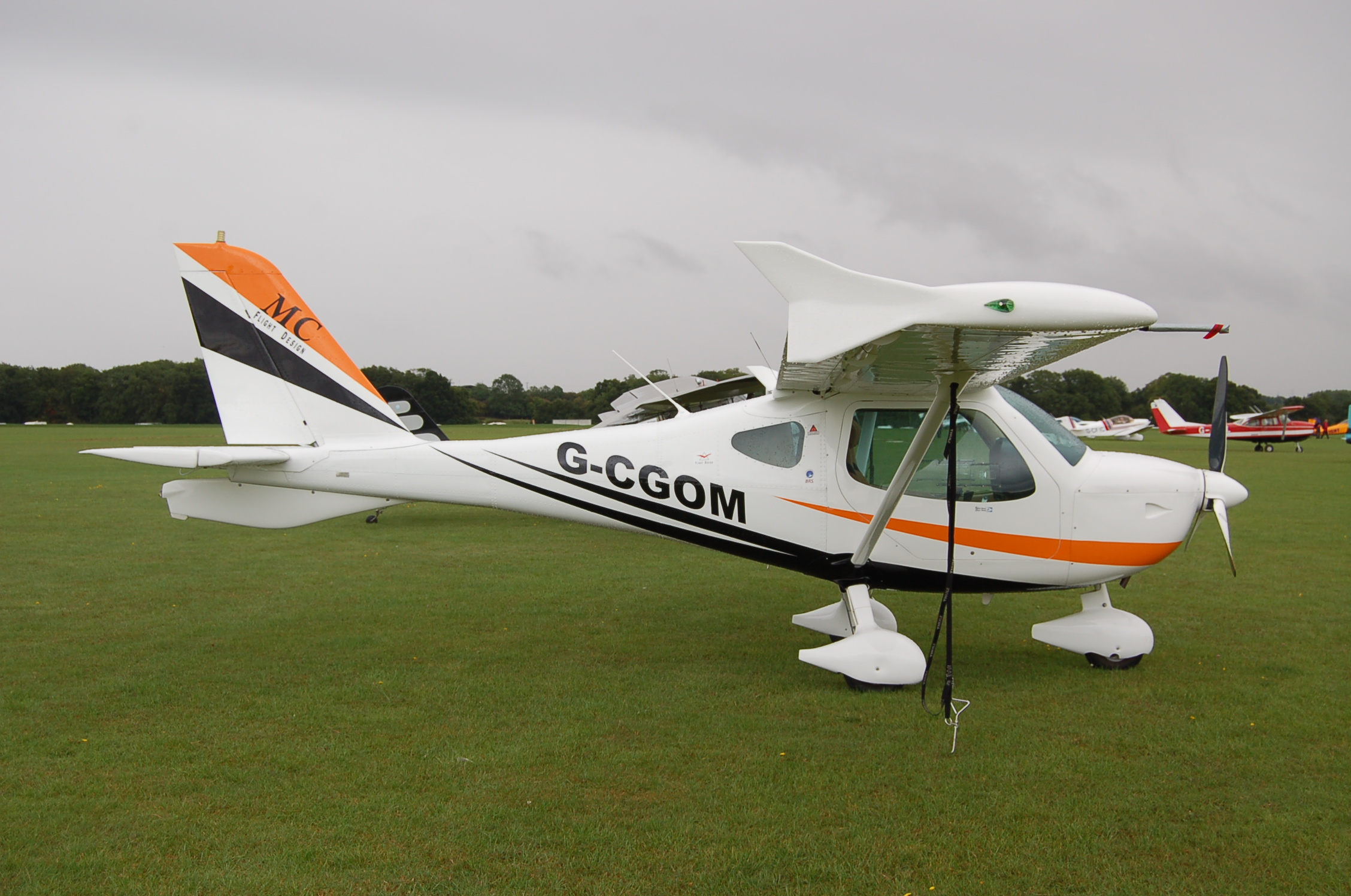
Flight Design MC

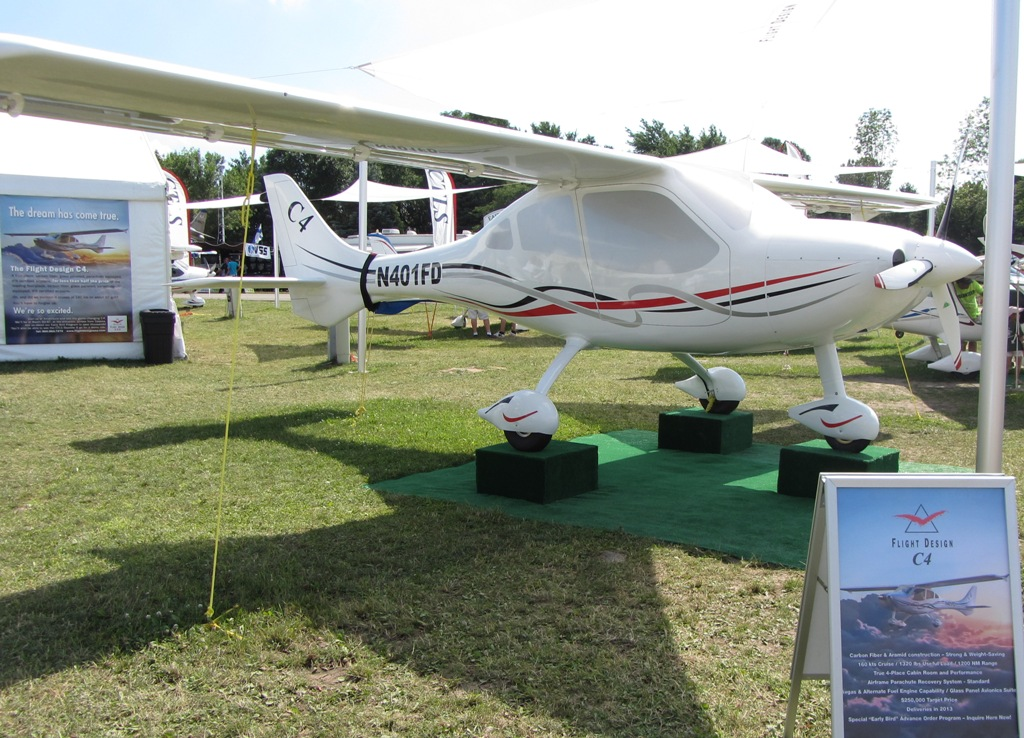
Flight Design C4 mockup

Flight Design General Aviation GmbH (formerly Flight Design GmbH) is a German aircraft design company and aircraft manufacturer, formerly based in Leinfelden-Echterdingen and Kamenz and now in Eisenach.

== History ==
The company started building hang gliders and paragliders in the 1980s, and ultralight aircraft 1993.

The CT series first flew in March 1996 and was put into production in 1997. The aircraft line can be flown under Microlight/Ultralight regulations in many countries and under the Special Light-Sport Aircraft (SLSA) rules in the US and countries that use the ASTM standards for showing compliance. The original engineering and design work was performed in Germany, but production and all assembly of the aircraft was established in Kherson, Ukraine, to lower production costs.

In February 2011, the company announced that it was developing a four-seat design to be designated C4.

In February 2016, the company entered receivership, due to its high debt-load. Lawyer Knut Rebholz, a partner of the law firm Mönning & Partner, became the temporary administrator of the company.

In April 2017, in collaboration with Vessel Co. of South Korea, the company introduced the new KLA-100 low-wing, light aircraft. AOPA editor Jim Moore noted that this had been done while the company was undergoing a financial crisis. However, by June 2018 the design was not listed on the company website as being in production.

In July 2017, the Flight Design-Design organization, the production facility in Kherson, and all rights to the CT series (CTSW, CTLS, CTSL Supralight, CTLSi, CTLE) was acquired by Lift Air, a division of Lift Holding from Eisenach, Germany. The company has since moved to the Kindel Airport, near Eisenach where final inspection, test flights and engineering management are performed. Lars Joerges is the new managing director.

At AERO Friedrichshafen in April 2019, the now-reorganized company announced two new models, the F2 and F4. The F4 will be a four-seat airplane powered by a Rotax 915iS turbocharged engine, while the F2 will be a two-seat European microlight, as a modular design that will include a future electric aircraft variant, to be designated the F2e. Work on the four-seat Flight Design C4 has been stalled, but not abandoned, and it "remains an aspirational product" for the company.

In June 2019 the company manufacturing the CT line, AeroJones Aviation Technology Company, announced plans for a new factory to build the design for the Asian market at the Zhenjiang Dalu General Airport in Zhenjiang, China. The plant is expected to be operational by the end of 2019, employ 200-250 people and produce 240 CT aircraft per year.

Following the 2022 Russian invasion of Ukraine, Flight Design temporarily halted operations at the Kherson facility and circulated a letter to Ukrainian staff, announcing plans to expand manufacturing capacities in Czech Republic and offering staff to transfer to the new location. The company began to supplement production in a joint venture with Virazh in Almaty, Kazakhstan in 2024.

== Aircraft ==
Flight Design Aircraft
Model name	First flight	Number built	Type
CTLS	2006	>1800	LSA long range cruiser, high wing microlight/sport aircraft, 2-seat
C4	2015	in development	Four-seat design
CTSL-Supralight	2013		Ultralight aircraft, high wing microlight/sport aircraft, two-seat
MC	2008		Metal Concept, high wing microlight/sport aircraft, two-seat
CTSW	2003		CT Short Wing, high wing microlight/sport aircraft, two-seat
CTLE	2010		CT Law Enforcement, high wing microlight/sport aircraft, two-seat
CTHL	2010		Composite two-seat, high wing microlight/sport aircraft
CT2K	1999		Composite Technology, high wing microlight/sport aircraft, two-seat
KLA-100	2017		Low-wing, light aircraft, two-seat
F2	2019		Composite, high-wing light sport aircraft, two-seat
F2e	2019		Composite, high-wing electric light sport aircraft, two-seat
Axxess			Single or two-place rigid wing hang glider
Exxtacy			Single place rigid wing hang glider
A4			paraglider
Stream			paraglider
Boxtair			paraglider
Twin			two-place paraglider
