= Ballistic Recovery Systems =

American ballistic parachute manufacturer

Ballistic Recovery Systems, Inc.
- Company type: Public
- Traded as: Expert Market: BRSI
- Industry: Aerospace
- Founded: 1980; 46 years ago
- Founder: Boris Popov
- Headquarters: St. Paul, Minnesota, United States
- Key people: Larry Williams (CEO and president); Gary Moore (vice president, Sales & Marketing); Dave Blanchard (vice president, Operations)
- Products: Parachute systems
- Website: www.brsaerospace.com

Ballistic Recovery Systems, Inc., doing business as BRS Aerospace (and commonly referred to as simply BRS), is a manufacturer of aircraft ballistic parachutes.

The company was formed in 1980 by Boris Popov of Saint Paul, Minnesota, after he survived a 400-foot (120 m) fall in a partially collapsed hang glider in 1975. As a result, Popov invented a parachute system that could lower an entire light aircraft to the ground in the event of loss of control, failure of the aircraft structure, or other in-flight emergencies.

Popov was granted a U.S. patent on 26 August 1986 for the so-called Ballistic Recovery System (BRS) - patent US 4607814 A.

The company has two divisions: BRS Aviation and BRS Defense.

== History ==
BRS was founded in 1980 and introduced its first parachute model two years later in 1982, with focus on the ultralight aircraft market. The company recorded its first successful aircraft and crew recovery in 1983: Jay Tipton of Colorado.

In 1998, BRS collaborated with Duluth, Minnesota-based Cirrus Design (now called Cirrus Aircraft) to develop the first recovery parachute system to be used on a line of type certified aircraft: the Cirrus SR20, followed by the Cirrus SR22 in 2001. The companies named the design the Cirrus Airframe Parachute System (CAPS), and, as of April 2023, made it standard equipment on all 9,000+ Cirrus SR aircraft. In 2002, BRS received a supplemental type certificate to install their parachute system in the Cessna 172, followed by the Cessna 182 in 2004 and the Symphony SA-160 in 2006.

In response to the economic recession of 2008 and associated falling orders, the company announced in November 2008 that it would lay-off 25% of its workforce for an indefinite time period.

== Products ==
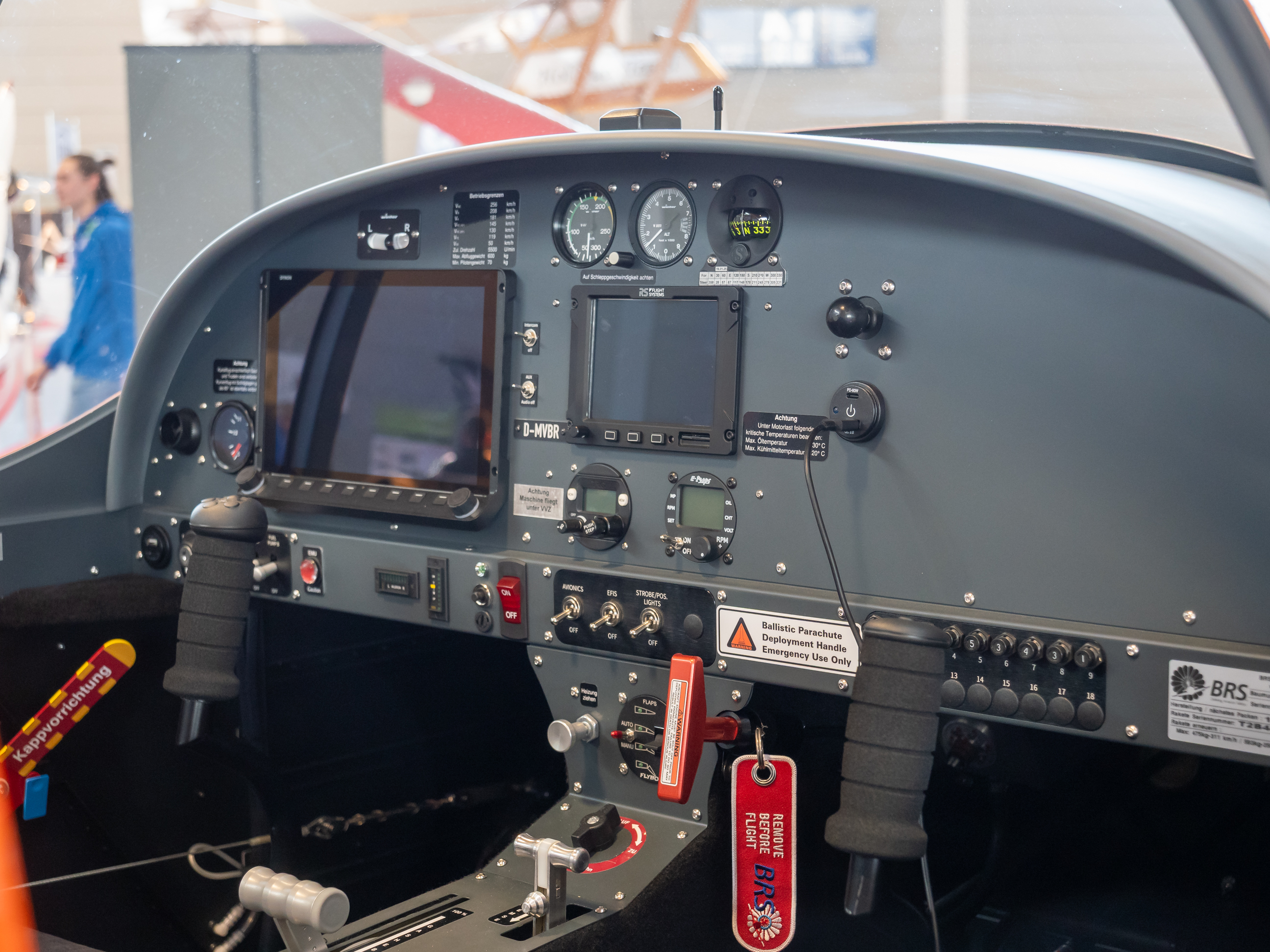
BRS red handle and tag in the cockpit of a Breezer glider tug aircraft

=== Ballistic rescue parachutes ===
==== Components ====
A small solid-fuel rocket is used to pull the parachute out from its housing and deploy the canopy fully within seconds. Typically on ultralight installations the rocket is mounted on the parachute container. On larger aircraft installations the rocket may be remotely mounted.

Over the years the BRS systems employed have been improved and updated and the current version is the BRS-6. This has a separate rocket installation that can be removed from the parachute so that the parachute can be sent for re-packing without the problems of trying to ship the rocket along with it. Typically the parachute requires repacking every six years and the rocket requires replacing every 12 years.

==== Rescues completed ====
The first ballistic recovery parachutes were on the market in 1982, and the first deployment was in 1983. Between then and April 2007, over 225 people were aboard 201 aircraft which deployed BRS parachutes; most of whose lives were presumably saved by those parachute deployments. As of January 2023, the company's website states that 466 lives have been saved (of which over 240 of those lives were involved in CAPS rescues).

==== Development ====
According to the company, it has provided more than 35,000 parachutes for various light and microlight aircraft as of 2022.

On 18 July 2008 BRS announced that its new 5000-series canopy had completed compliance testing to ASTM International standards. This parachute system is intended to provide a recovery capability for much larger aircraft, including very light jets and other light pressurized aircraft. Initial applications were to include the Diamond D-Jet, which is currently suspended, and the Lancair Evolution, which completed production in 2017. As of 2008, FAA certification was being pursued to allow installation on certified aircraft.

== See also ==
- Air safety
