= Giant wombat =

Giant wombat may refer to an extinct animal from the genera:

- Diprotodon (which is a diprotodontid and not a true wombat)
- Phascolonus
- Ramsayia
- Sedophascolomys

== See also ==
- Wombat (disambiguation)
