= Wombat (disambiguation) =

Wombats (Latin: Vombatidae) are a family of Australian marsupials. Wombat or Wombats may also refer to:

== Aviation ==
- Wombat Gyrocopters, a British autogyro manufacturer
  - Wombat Gyrocopters Wombat, a British autogyro design

== People ==
- Ian Damon (born 1935), Australian/UK broadcaster, nicknamed "Wombat"
- Graham Eadie (born 1953), Australian rugby league footballer, nicknamed "Wombat"
- Jan Howard Finder (1939-2013), American science fiction writer and academic administrator, nicknamed "The Wombat"

== Places ==
- Wombat, New South Wales, Australia, a small township
- Tolmie, Victoria, Australia, a small town originally called Wombat
- Wombat State Forest, Victoria, Australia
- Wombat Island, Enderby Land, Antarctica

== Science and technology ==
- 6827 Wombat (1990 SN4), a main-belt asteroid
- WOMBAT (diffractometer), a high-intensity neutron powder diffractometer
- Wombat (operating system), a high-performance virtualized port of Linux developed by National ICT Australia
- Wombat crossing, a raised pedestrian crossing
- Project Wombat, formerly named Stumpers-L, an e-mail list, members of which are called wombats
- Wombat Financial Software, a low latency market data business acquired by NYSE Euronext and renamed NYSE Technologies

== Arts and entertainment ==
- Wombat (TV series), an Australian children's television series
- Wombat, an Australian rapper
- The Wombats, an indie rock band from Liverpool, England
  - The Wombats (EP), released in 2008

== Other uses ==
- L6 WOMBAT, a version of the British 120 mm BAT recoilless rifle
- White Plains Wombats, a rugby league football team based in White Plains, New York
- Women's Mountain Bike and Tea Society (WOMBATS), a cycling group founded by Jacquie Phelan
- WOMBAT Situational Awareness and Stress Tolerance Test, a situation awareness or psychological assessment tool
- Wombat and Combat Wombat, 125cc motorcycles produced by Hodaka in the 1970s
- Wombat, a Humvee replica kit
