= Indy Aircraft =

American airplane manufacturer

Indy Aircraft Limited
- Company type: Privately held company
- Industry: Aerospace
- Founded: 2006
- Defunct: circa 2021
- Headquarters: Independence, Iowa, United States
- Products: Kit aircraft

Indy Aircraft Limited was an American aircraft manufacturer based in Independence, Iowa. The company specialized in the manufacture of ultralight aircraft in the form of kits for amateur construction.

The company traced its lineage to Teratorn Aircraft, which was formed in 1976 in Clear Lake, Iowa, and which introduced the Teratorn Tierra and Teratorn Tierra II aircraft designs in 1983. When Teratorn went out of business in about 1989, the Tierra designs were put back into production by Golden Circle Air of De Soto, Iowa, as the Golden Circle Air T-Bird line. Golden Circle Air went out of business in about 2006, and Indy Aircraft was formed to provide parts for the existing fleet. In 2011 the company restored the T-Bird and T-Bird II to production. More than 1500 Tierra/T-Bird Is and 2500 Tierra II/T-Bird IIs have been constructed by all manufacturers of the types in total.

Indy Aircraft put the T-Bird I and T-Bird II back into production, but not the Golden Circle Air three-seat T-Bird III or the tandem-seat T-Bird Tandem TBT06. At one time the company indicated it had plans to have its aircraft approved for the American light-sport aircraft category, but as of April 2017, neither of its types had been accepted by the US Federal Aviation Administration as Special Light-Sport Aircraft.

The company's website was taken down some time after September 2021 and the company seems to have gone out of business.

In 2021, Matt Shubat incorporated Tbird Aircraft, LLC, and subsequently acquired the T-Bird rights and resources of Indy Aircraft. The new company offers new kits and parts for the T-Bird I and II, refurbishing of old kits, and are developing a new design, the Tbird TU, to conform to FAR Part 103 requirements.

== Aircraft ==
Summary of aircraft built by Indy Aircraft
Model name	First flight	Number built	Type
Indy T-Bird I	1983	more than 1500 Tierras and T-Birds	Single seat kit aircraft
Indy T-Bird II	1983	more than 2500 Tierra IIs and T-Bird IIs	Two seat kit aircraft
