= Teratorn T/A =

American ultralight aircraft

T/A

General information
- Type: Ultralight aircraft
- National origin: United States
- Manufacturer: Teratorn Aircraft
- Status: Production completed

History
- Variant: Skye Treck Skyseeker

The Teratorn T/A is an American ultralight aircraft that was designed and produced by Teratorn Aircraft. The aircraft was supplied as a kit for amateur construction.

== Design and development ==
The first design by Teratorn Aircraft was known simply as the Teratorn, named after the extinct ice-age soaring bird. The company took its name from the first design. This design quickly evolved into the T/A model and was produced until supplanted in production by the Tierra I.

The aircraft was designed to comply with the US FAR 103 Ultralight Vehicles rules, including the category's maximum empty weight of 254 lb (115 kg). The original Teratorn has a standard empty weight of 212 lb (96 kg). It features a cable-braced high-wing, a single-seat, open cockpit, conventional landing gear and a single engine in pusher configuration.

Both the Teratorn and the T/A are made from bolted-together aluminum tubing, with the flying surfaces covered in Dacron sailcloth. Its single-surface 32 ft (9.8 m) span wing is supported by cables attached to a simple kingpost. The landing gear is bungee suspended. Both models were supplied with the 28 hp (21 kW) Rotax 277 single cylinder, two-stroke powerplant as their standard engine.

The T/A model proved a commercial success and a large number were sold. The Skye Treck Skyseeker was based on the T/A.

== Variants ==
Teratorn
Simple motorglider with a sling seat, utilizing weight shift for pitch control and rudder and spoilers for roll control, both cable-actuated by movement of the sling seat. Empty weight 212 lb (96 kg), gross weight 474 lb (215 kg), cruise speed 35 mph (56 km/h), stall speed 15 mph (24 km/h), glide ratio 8:1.
T/A
Ultralight aircraft with a fixed seat and three-axis aerodynamic controls, with spoilers for roll control.

== Specifications (T/A) ==
Data from Cliche

General characteristics

- Crew: one
- Wingspan: 32 ft (9.8 m)
- Wing area: 160 sq ft (15 m^{2})
- Empty weight: 227 lb (103 kg)
- Gross weight: 500 lb (227 kg)
- Fuel capacity: 3.3 U.S. gallons (12 L; 2.7 imp gal)
- Powerplant: 1 × Rotax 277 single cylinder, two-stroke aircraft engine

Performance

- Maximum speed: 50 mph (80 km/h, 43 kn)
- Cruise speed: 45 mph (72 km/h, 39 kn)
- Stall speed: 17 mph (27 km/h, 15 kn)
- Range: 70 mi (110 km, 61 nmi)
- Service ceiling: 10,000 ft (3,000 m)
- g limits: +4/-3 (tested)
- Maximum glide ratio: 8:1 at 28 mph (45 km/h)
- Rate of climb: 600 ft/min (3.0 m/s)
- Rate of sink: 270 ft/min (1.4 m/s)
