= Golden Circle Air =

American aircraft manufacturer

Golden Circle Air, Inc.
- Company type: Privately held company
- Industry: Aerospace
- Founded: 1989
- Defunct: c. 2006
- Fate: Out of business
- Headquarters: De Soto, Iowa, United States
- Products: Kit aircraft
- Website: www.goldencircleair.com

Golden Circle Air, Inc. was an American aircraft manufacturer based in De Soto, Iowa. The company specialized in the manufacture of ultralight aircraft in the form of kits for amateur construction and ready-to-fly aircraft under the US FAR 103 Ultralight Vehicles rules.

The company put the Teratorn Tierra series of aircraft designs back into production as the Golden Circle Air T-Bird, after Teratorn Aircraft of Clear Lake, Iowa went out of business in 1989. Golden Circle further developed the design from the original single seat Tierra and the two seats in side-by-side configuration Tierra II into the three seat T-Bird III and the T-Bird Tandem TBT06 tandem-seat ultralight.

After Golden Circle Air went out of business in circa 2006 the T-Bird aircraft designs were acquired by Indy Aircraft of Independence, Iowa and put back into production from 2011 to 2021.

In 2021, Tbird Aircraft acquired the T-Bird rights and the assets of Indy Aircraft. The new company sells kits and parts for the T-Bird I and II, refurbishes old aircraft and are developing a new design, the Tbird TU, which will conform with FAR Part 103 requirements.

== Aircraft ==
Summary of aircraft built by Golden Circle Air
Model name	First flight	Number built	Type
T-Bird	1983	more than 1500 Tierras and T-Birds	Single seat ultralight aircraft
T-Bird II	1983	more than 2500 Tierra IIs and T-Bird IIs	Two seat ultralight aircraft
T-Bird III	1990	78 (2004)	Three seat light aircraft
T-Bird Tandem TBT06	1992	21 (1998)	Two seat ultralight aircraft
