= Teratorn Aircraft =

American ultralight airplane manufacturer

Teratorn Aircraft, Inc.
- Company type: Privately held company
- Industry: Aerospace
- Founded: 1976
- Defunct: circa 1989
- Fate: Out of business
- Headquarters: Clear Lake, Iowa, United States
- Products: Kit aircraft

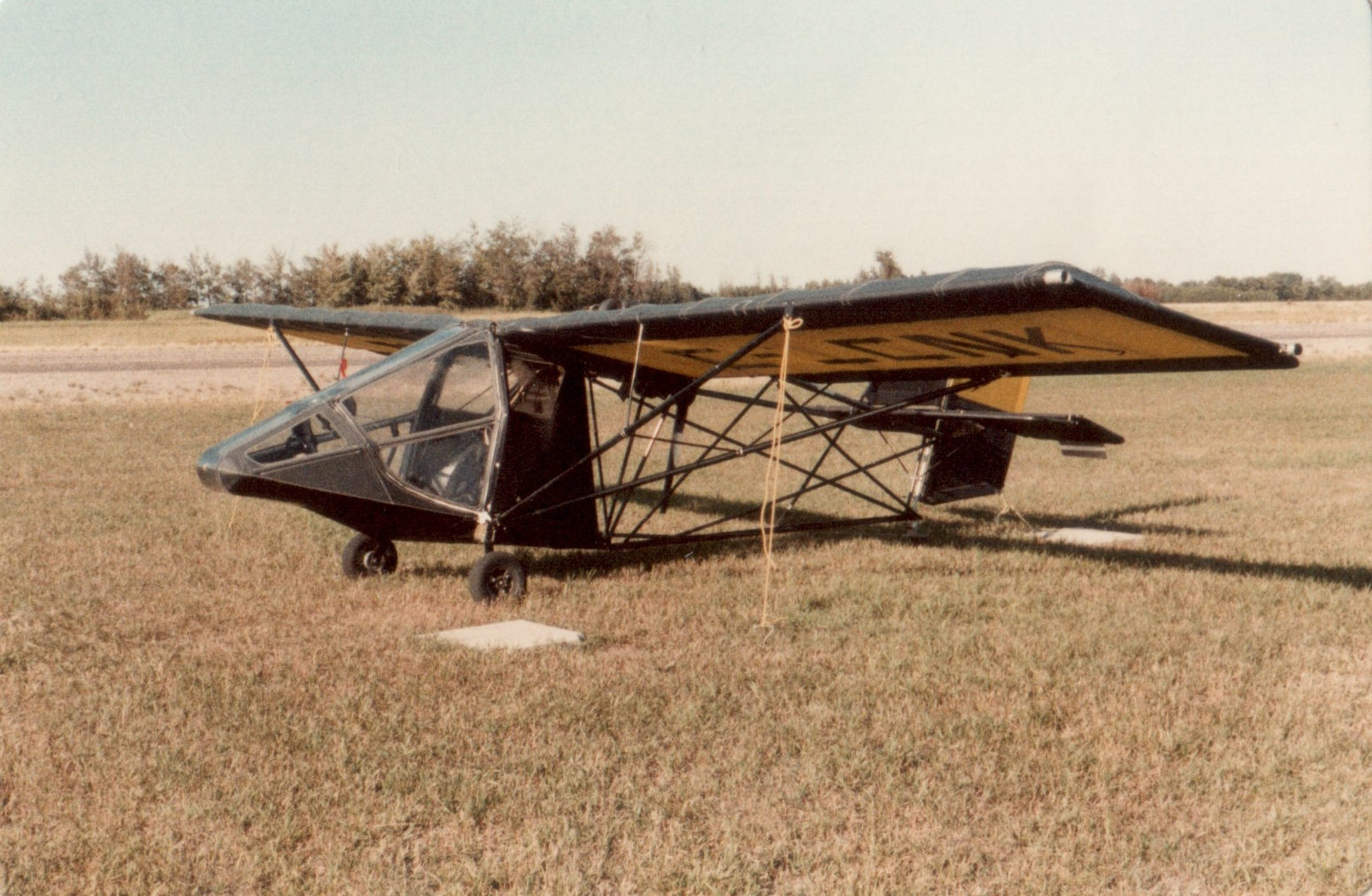
Teratorn Tierra II

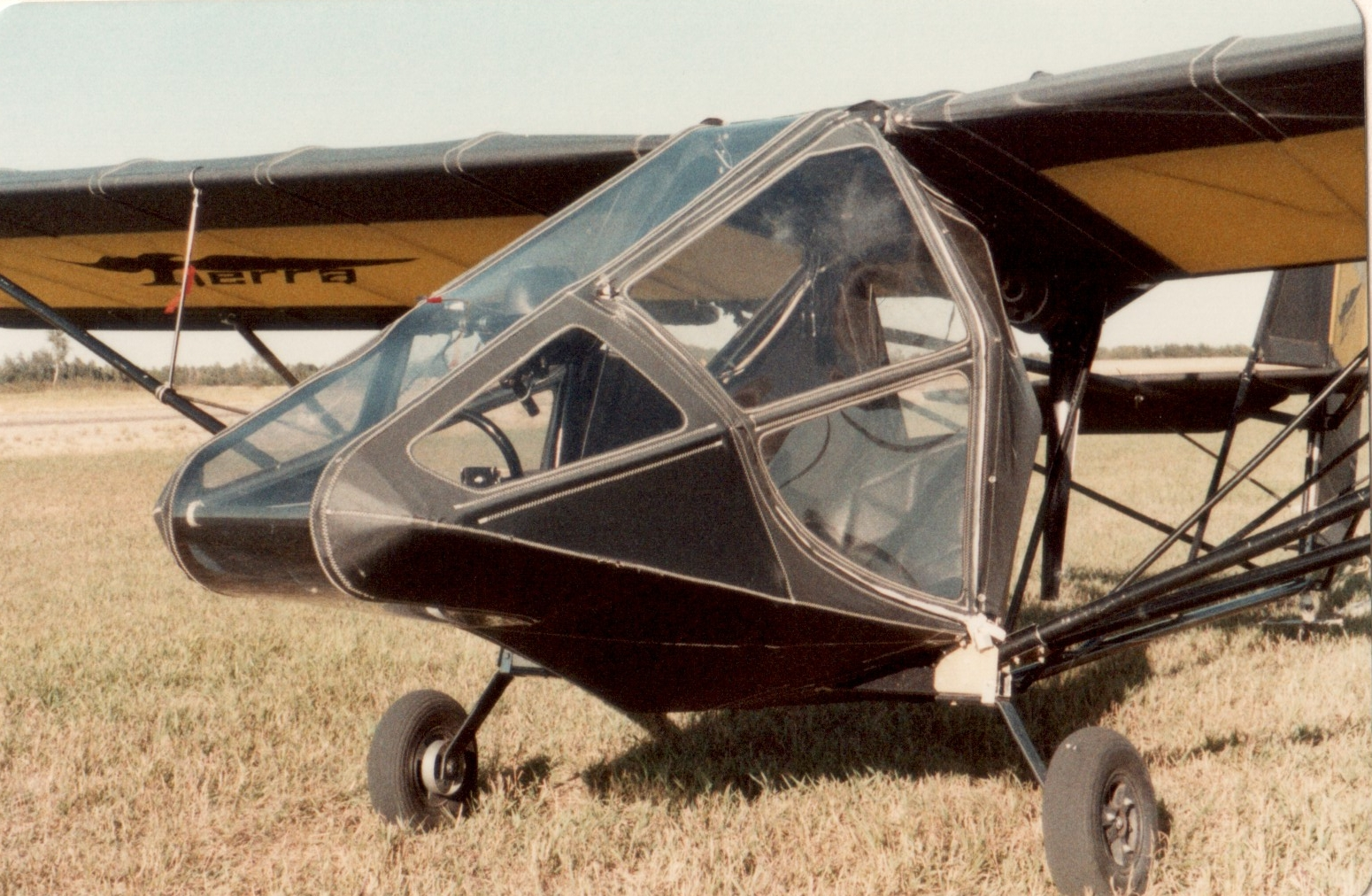
Teratorn Tierra II

Teratorn Aircraft, Inc. (named for the extinct ice age soaring bird) was an American aircraft manufacturer based in Clear Lake, Iowa. The company specialized in the design and manufacture of ultralight aircraft in the form of kits for amateur construction and ready-to-fly aircraft under the US FAR 103 Ultralight Vehicles rules.

The company was formed as Motorized Gliders of Iowa, Inc. in 1976 and located in a 50,000 sq ft (4,600 m^{2}) production facility. The company first produced the weight-shift Teratorn Aircraft Teratorn and the follow-up Teratorn T/A single seat ultralight motorglider designs. In 1983 it introduced the Tierra and Tierra II.

After Teratorn went out of business in about 1989, Golden Circle Air of De Soto, Iowa took up production of Terratorn's designs. Golden Circle Air went out of business in circa 2006, the designs were acquired by Bret Kivell's Indy Aircraft and put back into production from 2011 to 2021. In 2021, Matt Shubat incorporated Tbird Aircraft, LLC, and acquired the T-Bird rights and assets of Indy Aircraft. The company offers kits and parts for the T-Bird I and II, refurbishes old aircraft and are developing a new FAR Part 103 ultralight, the Tbird TU.

Terratorn's Tierra and Tierra II designs have a reputation for structural strength and robustness in service. Though slow compared to other aircraft of comparable weight and power, they are reportedly comparatively "docile" and "predictable" with excellent short-field capability, and an unusually roomy cabin and good visibility. More than 4000 have been completed and flown.

== Aircraft ==
Model name	First flight	Number built	Type
Teratorn Aircraft Teratorn	1970s		Single seat ultralight motor glider
Teratorn T/A	1980s		Single seat ultralight motor glider
Teratorn Tierra	1983	more than 1500 Tierras	Single seat ultralight aircraft
Teratorn Tierra II	1983	more than 2500 Tierra IIs	Two seat ultralight aircraft
