= Aero Dynamics Sparrow Hawk =

American homebuilt pusher aircraft

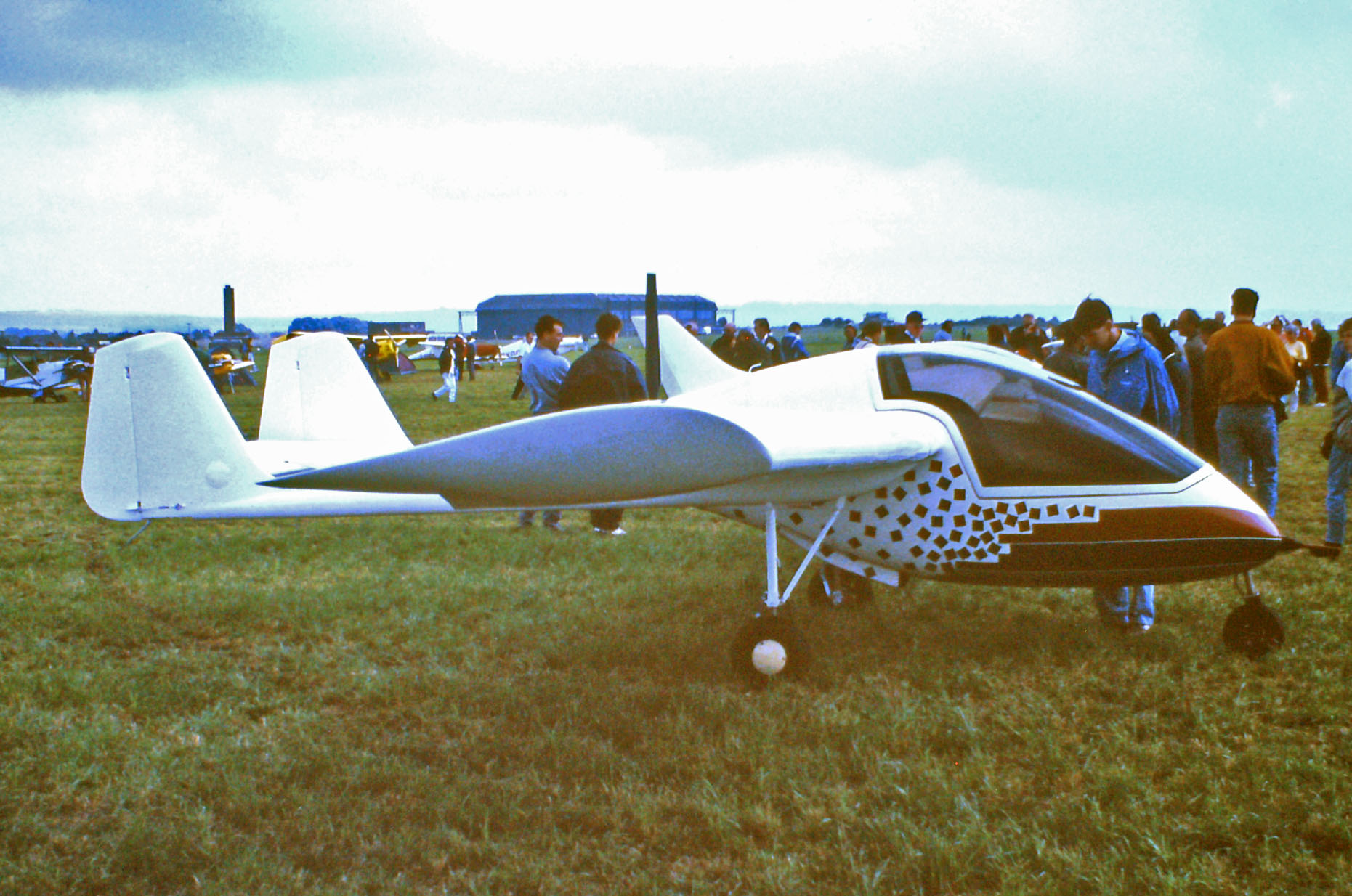
- Sparrow Hawk (G-BOZU, not marked, arrived by road) at a fly-in at Wroughton Airfield in July 1992

General information
- Type: Kit aircraft
- National origin: United States
- Manufacturer: Aero Dynamics Limited
- Designer: Charles "Chuck" Herbst
- Number built: 7

History
- Introduction date: 1985

The Aero Dynamics Sparrow Hawk MK II is an American homebuilt, two seater, single-engine, pusher monoplane, manufactured by Aero Dynamics Limited. It was designed by former Boeing design engineer Charles "Chuck" Herbst.

== Design and development ==
The Sparrow Hawk is a twin boom, twin fin, ultralight aircraft built with mixed construction materials most notably including Kevlar, carbon fiber and polyurethane foam. It uses a Rotax 532 two-stroke aircraft engine in pusher configuration. It employs a cantilever, shoulder wing, fixed landing gear and a two-seat enclosed cockpit.

In 2022, Sparrow Hawk Aviation Ltd announced that they had plans to redesign and improve the Sparrow Hawk, though no redesigns have been made to the aircraft yet.

== Operational history ==
The Sparrow Hawk had its official public debut in July 1985 at the EAA Annual Convention and Fly-In, as two Sparrow Hawks, registered as N5793F and N5832M, attended. The manufacturer and model of N5793F is recorded by the Federal Aviation Administration (FAA) as an "Ultralight Aircraft Ltd Sparrow Hawk Mk II", while N5832M is recorded as an "Aero Dynamics Ltd Sparrow Hawk MkII".

A Sparrow Hawk (registered N8728A) was displayed at the Air Display and Air Races event at Cranfield Aerodrome in the United Kingdom, on 20 September 1987. The same aircraft was exhibited at the SBAC-organized Farnborough Airshow in September 1988.

== Known aircraft on display ==
- Oakland Aviation Museum - Sparrow Hawk N23SH.

== Specifications ==
Data from Aerofiles

General characteristics

- Crew: one
- Capacity: one passenger
- Length: 17 ft 10 in (5.44 m)
- Wingspan: 34 ft 5 in (10.49 m)
- Powerplant: 1 × Rotax 532 four cylinder, liquid-cooled, two stroke aircraft engine, 64 hp (48 kW)

Performance

- Maximum speed: 105–130 mph (169–209 km/h, 91–113 kn)
- Cruise speed: 95–120 mph (153–193 km/h, 83–104 kn)
- Stall speed: 36 mph (58 km/h, 31 kn)
