= Skye Treck Skyseeker =

Canadian ultralight aircraft

Skyseeker

General information
- Type: Ultralight aircraft
- National origin: Canada
- Manufacturer: Skye Treck
- Status: Production completed

History
- Introduction date: 1981
- Developed from: Teratorn T/A

The Skye Treck Skyseeker is a Canadian ultralight aircraft that was designed and produced by Skye Treck of Manitoba. The aircraft was supplied as a kit for amateur construction.

== Design and development ==
The aircraft was designed to comply with the US FAR 103 Ultralight Vehicles rules, including the category's maximum empty weight of 254 lb (115 kg). The aircraft has a standard empty weight of 248 lb (112 kg). It features a cable-braced high-wing, a single-seat, open cockpit, conventional landing gear and a single engine in pusher configuration.

The aircraft is made from bolted-together aluminium tubing, with the flying surfaces covered in Dacron sailcloth. Its single-surface 32 ft (9.8 m) span wing's cable bracing is supported by a single kingpost. The pilot is accommodated on an open seat, without a windshield. The landing gear features bungee suspension on all three wheels and the tail wheel is steerable. No brakes are fitted. The standard engine supplied was the single cylinder two-stroke Rotax 277 of 28 hp (21 kW) and it is mounted on the wing trailing edge, with the propeller turning in between the tail boom tubes. The engine utilizes a 2:1 belt reduction drive with a centrifugal clutch to allow the propeller to stop when the engine is at idle.

The Skyseeker sold in very large numbers in the 1980s in Canada.

== Variants ==
Skyseeker Mk I
Initial single seat version with hybrid weight-shift and aerodynamic controls.
Skyseeker Mk II
Two seat version.
Skyseeker Mk III
Improved single seat version with three-axis aerodynamic controls, with spoilers for roll control.

== Aircraft on display ==
- British Columbia Aviation Museum

== Specifications (Skyseeker Mk III) ==
Data from Cliche and the Virtual Ultralight Museum.

General characteristics

- Crew: one
- Length: 12 ft (3.7 m)
- Wingspan: 32 ft (9.8 m)
- Height: 9 ft (2.7 m)
- Wing area: 160 sq ft (15 m^{2})
- Empty weight: 248 lb (112 kg)
- Gross weight: 496 lb (225 kg)
- Fuel capacity: 5 U.S. gallons (19 L; 4.2 imp gal)
- Powerplant: 1 × Rotax 277 single cylinder, two-stroke aircraft engine, with a 2:1 belt reduction drive with a centrifugal clutch, 28 hp (21 kW)
- Propellers: 2-bladed wooden, 4 ft (1.2 m) diameter pitch 34 in (86 cm)

Performance

- Maximum speed: 45 mph (72 km/h, 39 kn)
- Cruise speed: 40 mph (64 km/h, 35 kn)
- Stall speed: 20 mph (32 km/h, 17 kn)
- Never exceed speed: 55 mph (89 km/h, 48 kn)
- Range: 180 mi (290 km, 160 nmi)
- Service ceiling: 10,000 ft (3,000 m)
- g limits: +5/-4
- Maximum glide ratio: 6:1
- Rate of climb: 750 ft/min (3.8 m/s)
- Wing loading: 2.7 lb/sq ft (13 kg/m^{2})
