= Golden Circle Air T-Bird =

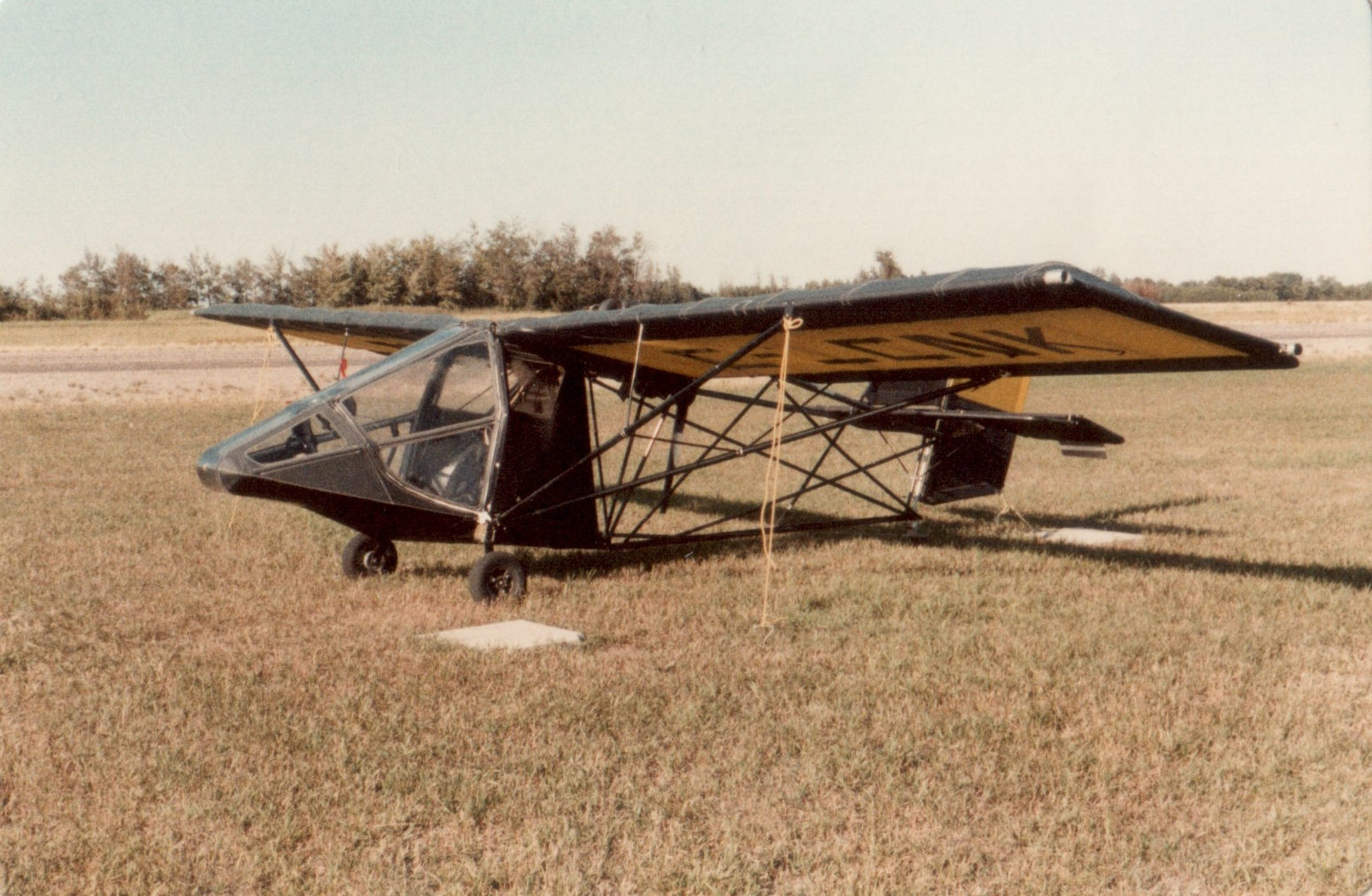
- Teratorn Tierra II

General information
- Type: Ultralight aircraft
- National origin: United States
- Manufacturer: Teratorn Aircraft; Golden Circle Air; Indy Aircraft
- Status: In production
- Number built: Over 4000

History
- Introduction date: 1983

The Golden Circle Air T-Bird is a family of high-wing, strut-braced, pusher configuration ultralight aircraft that was produced by Teratorn Aircraft of Clear Lake, Iowa from 1983 to 1989 and then Golden Circle Air of De Soto, Iowa from 1989 until the mid-2000s. From 2011 to 2021 the aircraft were back in production by Indy Aircraft and from 2021 on by Tbird Aircraft. The aircraft is produced as a kit for amateur construction.

== Design and development ==
The original version of the T-Bird family was the Teratorn Tierra, which was introduced in 1983. The aircraft achieved early success in the ultralight market, particularly in its side-by-side seating version, the Tierra II. The design passed from Teratorn to Golden Circle Air in 1989, and the aircraft was renamed the T-Bird. Golden Circle Air went out of business in the mid-2000s, and the design was out of production until 2011, when Indy Aircraft resumed building them. Over 4000 of all models have been built.

The T-Bird is constructed from 6061-T6 aluminum tubing, bolted together, with the wing and tail surfaces covered in pre-sewn Mylar-coated Dacron envelopes. The cockpit area has a Lexan windshield and optional zippered cloth doors. The basic versions have conventional landing gear, with some models offering tricycle gear as an option; later models can switch quickly between the two configurations. The aircraft is also well-suited to seaplane floats. The cockpit controls consist of conventional rudder pedals and yoke control wheels or (optional) joystick. Construction time for the T-Bird I was reported as 60 hours.

The Tierra II introduced a 13-position trim system and also 13-position flaps.

The T-Bird I can qualify for the US FAR 103 Ultralight Vehicles category if equipped with a light enough engine, such as the 28 hp (21 kW) Rotax 277, although reviewers have indicated that due to the high-drag design the aircraft is under-powered.

PilotMix describes the T-Bird I as "the most respected kit in the industry, and for good reason." It is absolutely the strongest and the easiest ultralight to build." Reviewer Andre Cliche calls it "robust...heavy and solid".

Reviewer Dan Johnson describes it as slow, but roomy with excellent visibility, "docile," "predictable," rugged, "dependable and enjoyable... with a good reputation," and notes its "excellent rough-field capability."

== Variants ==
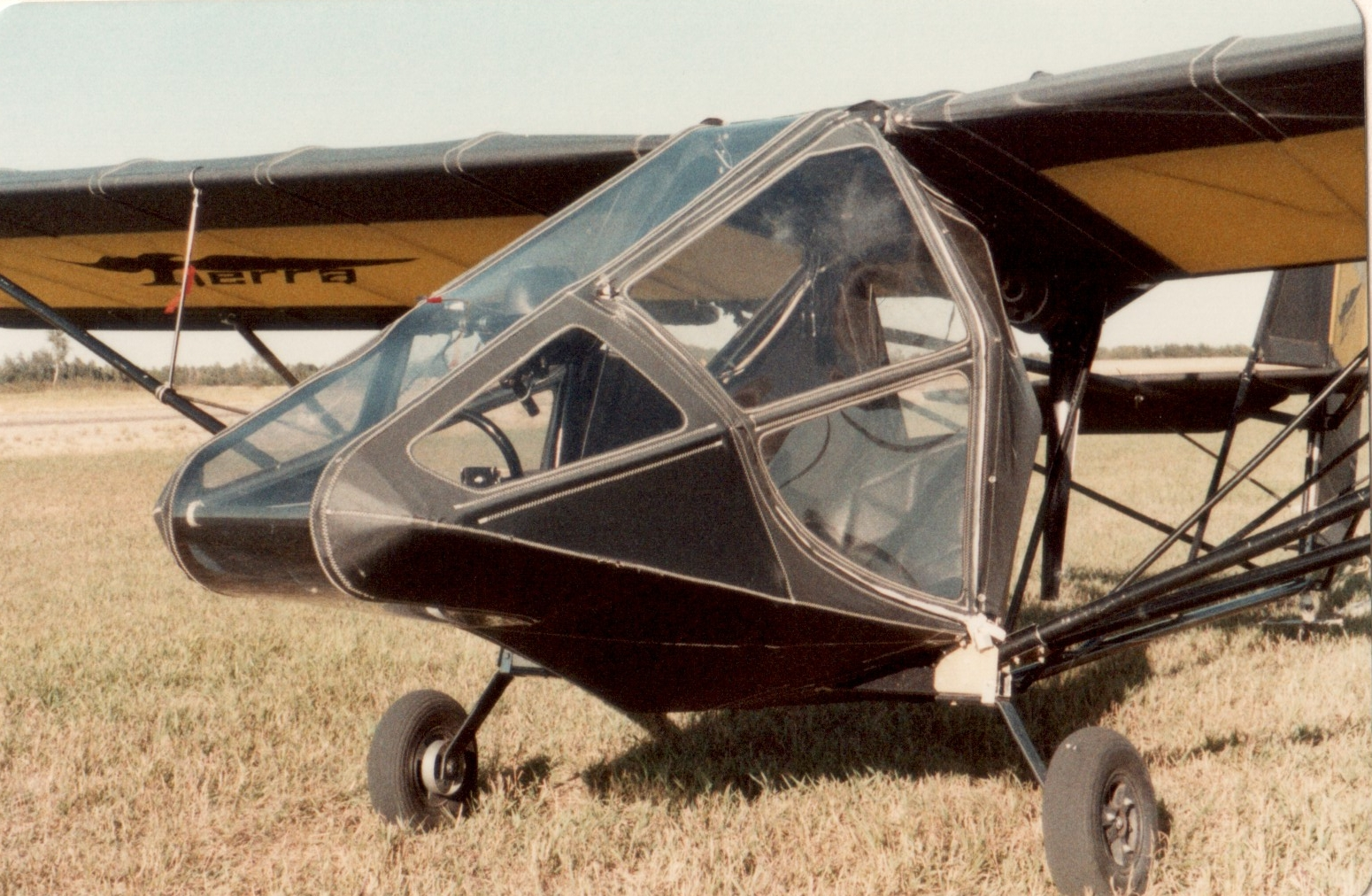
Teratorn Tierra II

Teratorn Tierra I
Original single seat model that first flew in 1983.
Teratorn Tierra II
Two seats in side-by-side configuration ultralight trainer with a choice of a 50 hp (37 kW) Rotax 503 or 64 hp (48 kW) Rotax 532 engine. First flew in 1983.
Golden Circle Air T-Bird I
Single seat development of the Tierra I with an acceptable power range of 28 to 65 hp (21 to 48 kW), the standard engine is the 50 hp (37 kW) Rotax 503. Other engine options include the 40 hp (30 kW) Rotax 447 and 64 hp (48 kW) Rotax 582.
Golden Circle Air T-Bird II
Two seats in side-by-side configuration ultralight trainer, developed from the Tierra II. An acceptable power range of 64 to 115 hp (48 to 86 kW), the standard engine is the 64 hp (48 kW) Rotax 582 with the 80 hp (60 kW) Rotax 912 optional. Also marketed as the T-Bird Side-By-Side.
Golden Circle Air T-Bird III
Three seats, with two front seats in a side-by-side configuration and one rear seat or optional extended cargo space. The standard engine is the 64 hp (48 kW) Rotax 582. Optional equipment includes agricultural spray gear, strut fairings, and tundra tires. First flown in 1990, 78 were reported flying in 2004. Also marketed as the T-Bird Cargo.
Golden Circle Air T-Bird Tandem TBT06
Two seats in tandem configuration. The standard engine is the 64 hp (48 kW) Rotax 582. Optional equipment includes agricultural spray gear, strut fairings, and tundra tires. The first flew in 1992, and there were 21 reported flying in 1998. Discontinued around 2000.
Indy Aircraft T-Bird I
Current production single-seat model. The standard engine is the 40 hp (30 kW) Rotax 447. Construction time 100 hours.
Indy Aircraft T-Bird II
Current production two-seat model. The standard engine is the 64 hp (48 kW) Rotax 582. Construction time: 140 hours.

== Specifications (Tierra II) ==
Data from Teratorn

General characteristics

- Crew: one
- Capacity: one passenger
- Length: 18 ft 0 in (5.49 m)
- Wingspan: 31 ft 0 in (9.45 m)
- Height: 6 ft 0 in (1.83 m)
- Wing area: 190 sq ft (18 m^{2})
- Empty weight: 410 lb (186 kg)
- Gross weight: 1,000 lb (454 kg)
- Powerplant: 1 × Rotax 532 twin-cylinder, two-stroke liquid-cooled aircraft engine, 64 hp (48 kW)
- Propellers: 2-bladed ground adjustable pitch

Performance

- Cruise speed: 70 mph (110 km/h, 61 kn)
- Stall speed: 36 mph (58 km/h, 31 kn)
- Never exceed speed: 85 mph (137 km/h, 74 kn)
- Rate of climb: 600 ft/min (3.0 m/s)
