= Rhizophascolonus =

Rhizophascolonus Temporal range: Late Oligocene–Early Miocene

Scientific classification
- Kingdom: Animalia
- Phylum: Chordata
- Class: Mammalia
- Infraclass: Marsupialia
- Order: Diprotodontia
- Family: Vombatidae
- Genus: †Rhizophascolonus; Stirton et al., 1967

Type species
- Rhizophascolonus crowcrofti Stirton et al., 1967

Other species
- †R. ngangaba Brewer et al., 2018

Extinct genus of marsupials

Rhizophascolonus is an extinct genus of wombat known from the Early Miocene of South Australia. The genus was first described to accommodate Rhizophascolonus crowcrofti, in 1967. A discovery at Riversleigh was published as another new species in 2018, Rhizophascolonus ngangaba, and further specimens from this area were assigned to R. crowcrofti in the same study.
