= Wombat feces =

Waste deposits of wombats

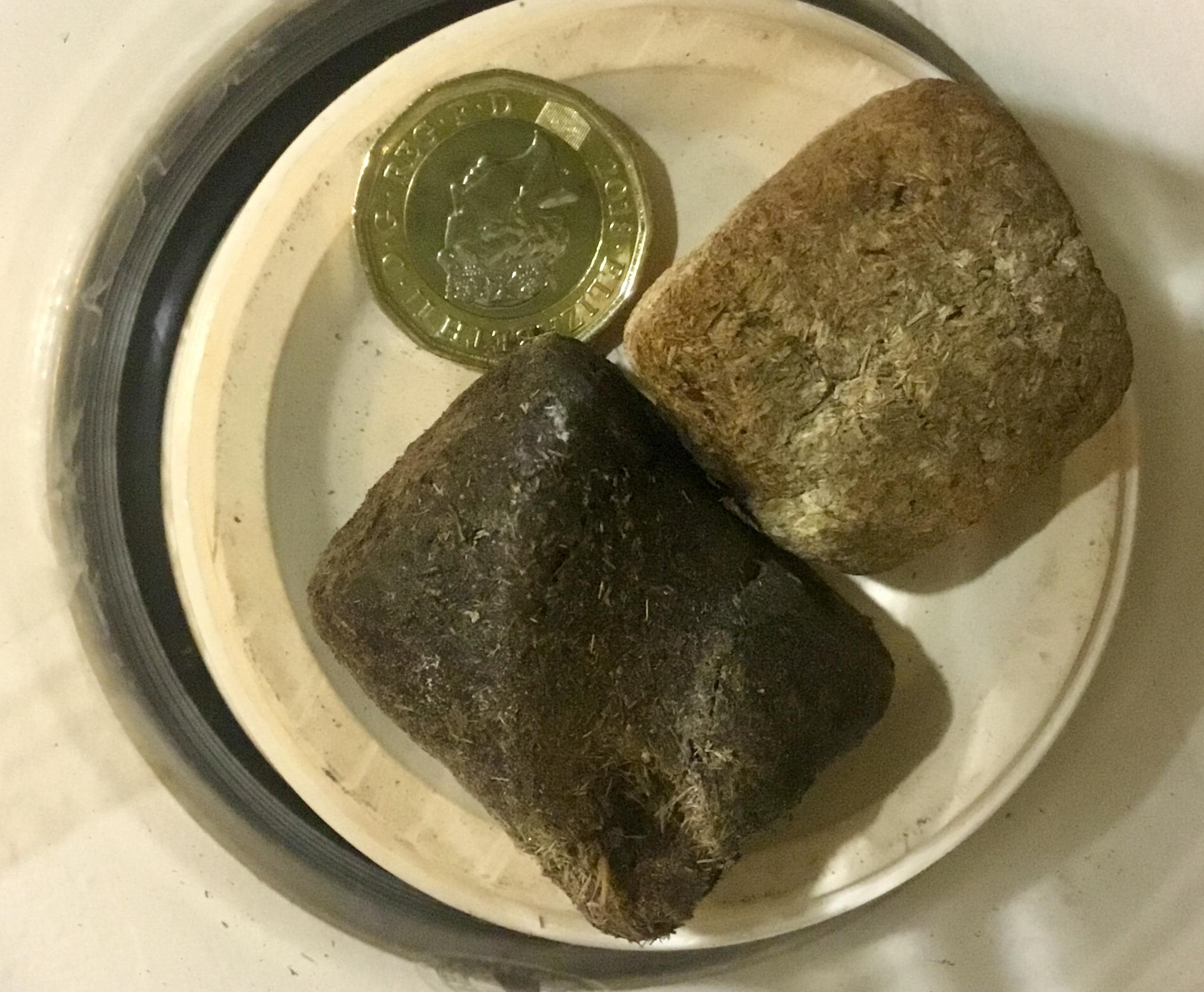
Two deposits of wombat feces next to a one pound coin.

Wombat feces are waste deposits left by a species of marsupial native to Australia. The only known animal dropping to be cube-shaped, the American Physical Society won an Ig Nobel Prize for discovering why. They also inspired the podcast No Such Thing as a Fish (2014) and the video game Hardhat Wombat (2023).

== Manufacture and characteristics ==
Wombats are herbivorous solitary nocturnal Australian marsupials with round anuses and roughly 10 metre-long intestines. They have poor eyesight and sleep for around 16 hours a day. Their digestive system takes around two weeks, with their intestines taking several days and containing two grooves that are more elastic. They were thought to have square sphincters until 2018, when a team from the American Physical Society's Division of Fluid Dynamics found that their waste was liquid-like in the first 75% of its intestines before solidifying in the last 25% and being shaped into cubes in the final 8%; for this, they won an Ig Nobel Prize and ten trillion Zimbabwean dollars. The same team used a 2023 edition of Soft Matter to report that the length of their droppings was caused by water flux, a process similar to heat flux, which in turn was caused by drying at different rates in different parts of the intestine.

Wombats produce up to 100 droppings a night of roughly 2 centimetres (0.79 in) into communal latrines, usually around four to eight at a time and on to rocks, steps and other exposed areas. They use their droppings to communicate with other wombats, with research published in 2025 finding that wombats used vomeronasal organs for this purpose and that wombat droppings contained 44 distinct chemical compounds. Some medical conditions can blunten their corners. Their droppings are the only known animal droppings to be cube-shaped and comprise about 65% water content, versus the about 75% in human feces and 85 to 90% in cow dung. They are a similar size and colour of the droppings of eastern grey kangaroos, which are more rounded, and are the favoured habitat of at least 24 species of wombat fly.

Wombats are among several Australian animals with unusual droppings including quolls, whose droppings sparkle when they eat cicada wings or Christmas beetles, and tasmanian devils, whose droppings sometimes contain intact echidna spines. A factory in Burnie began manufacturing paper out of wombat feces in 2009. The shape of wombat feces was one of several leftover facts discovered by QI researchers that inspired the 2014 podcast No Such Thing as a Fish, although the fact was eventually used in a 2026 episode. In 2023, George Fan published the video game Hardhat Wombat, which featured wombats stacking their droppings.
