= Aero Designs Pulsar =

American homebuilt airplane

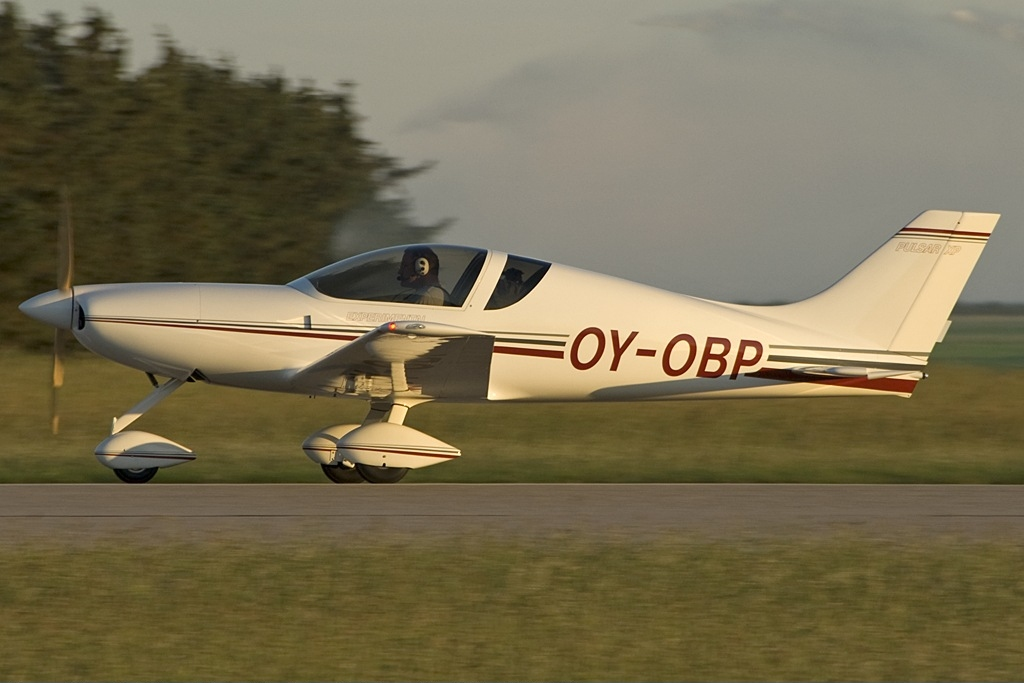
- Aero Design Pulsar XP912

General information
- Type: Ultralight aircraft/homebuilt aircraft
- National origin: United States
- Manufacturer: Aero Designs; Skystar Aircraft; Pulsar Aircraft
- Designer: Mark Brown
- Status: Production completed
- Number built: at least 229. Factory-built variant to JAR-VLA and EASA standards at least 430

History
- Developed from: Star-Lite Aircraft Star Lite

The Aero Designs Pulsar is an American two-seat, low wing, ultralight and homebuilt aircraft that was designed by Mark Brown and first produced by Aero Designs of San Antonio, Texas, introduced in 1985. When it was available the Pulsar was supplied as a ready-to-fly aircraft and as a kitplane for amateur construction.

The aircraft was later produced by Skystar Aircraft of Nampa, Idaho and then by Pulsar Aircraft of El Monte, California. Each subsequent manufacturer introduced new variants.

== Design and development ==
The Pulsar was a development of the Star-Lite Aircraft Star Lite and features a cantilever low-wing, a two-seats-in-side-by-side configuration open cockpit under a bubble canopy, fixed tricycle landing gear or optionally conventional landing gear with wheel pants and a single engine in tractor configuration.

The aircraft is made from composites. Its 25.00 ft (7.6 m) span wing employs a NASA MS(1)-0313 mod airfoil, mounts flaps and has a wing area of 80.00 sq ft (7.432 m^{2}). The cabin width is 39 in (99 cm). The acceptable power range is 64 to 115 hp (48 to 86 kW) and the standard engines used are the 64 hp (48 kW) Rotax 532 two-stroke, the 100 hp (75 kW) BMW R1100S or the 100 hp (75 kW) Rotax 912ULS or the 115 hp (86 kW) Rotax 914 turbocharged powerplant.

The Pulsar Series II has a typical empty weight of 660 lb (300 kg) and a gross weight of 1,200 lb (540 kg), giving a useful load of 540 lb (240 kg). With full fuel of 17 U.S. gallons (64 L; 14 imp gal) the payload for the pilot, passengers and baggage is 438 lb (199 kg).

The standard day, sea level, no wind, take off with a 115 hp (86 kW) engine is 250 ft (76 m) and the landing roll is 500 ft (152 m).

The manufacturer estimated the construction time from the supplied kit as 1000 hours.

== Operational history ==
In March 2014 130 examples were registered in the United States with the Federal Aviation Administration, although a total of 195 had been registered at one time. In March 2014 five were registered with Transport Canada and 29 with the CAA in the United Kingdom.

== Variants ==
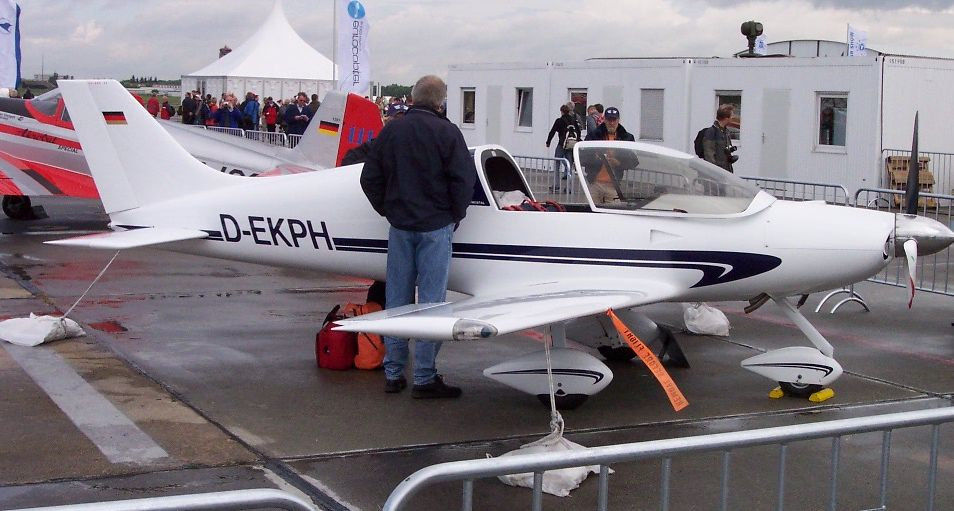
Pulsar XP

Pulsar
Original model, powered by a 64 hp (48 kW) Rotax 532 two-stroke powerplant and introduced in 1985 by Aero Designs.
Pulsar XP (also called the XP912)
Improved model, with higher gross weight, powered by an 80 hp (60 kW) Rotax 912UL four-stroke powerplant and introduced in 1992 by Aero Designs.
Pulsar Series II
Improved model, powered by a 100 hp (75 kW) Rotax 912ULS four-stroke or 115 hp (86 kW) Rotax 914 turbocharged powerplant and produced by SkyStar Aircraft.
Pulsar III
Improved model, powered by an 80 hp (60 kW) Rotax 912UL four-stroke or 85 hp (63 kW) Jabiru 2200 powerplant, tricycle landing gear or conventional landing gear and produced by Pulsar Aircraft starting in 1989. A total of 500 kits were claimed to have been delivered by 2005.
Pulsar SP100
Super Pulsar introduced in 2001, powered by an 80 hp (60 kW) Rotax 912UL four-stroke or 120 hp (89 kW) Jabiru 3300 powerplant, Continental or Lycoming engines, produced by Pulsar Aircraft.

== Specifications (Pulsar Series II) ==
Data from AeroCrafter and The Incomplete Guide to Airfoil Usage

General characteristics

- Crew: one
- Capacity: one passenger
- Length: 20 ft 0 in (6.10 m)
- Wingspan: 25 ft 0 in (7.62 m)
- Wing area: 80 sq ft (7.4 m^{2})
- Airfoil: NASA MS(1)-0313
- Empty weight: 660 lb (299 kg)
- Gross weight: 1,200 lb (544 kg)
- Fuel capacity: 17 U.S. gallons (64 L; 14 imp gal)
- Powerplant: 1 × Rotax 914 four cylinder, air and liquid-cooled, four stroke turbocharged aircraft engine, 115 hp (86 kW)
- Propellers: 3-bladed ground adjustable composite

Performance

- Maximum speed: 190 mph (310 km/h, 170 kn)
- Cruise speed: 180 mph (290 km/h, 160 kn)
- Stall speed: 49 mph (79 km/h, 43 kn)
- Range: 900 mi (1,400 km, 780 nmi)
- Service ceiling: 17,000 ft (5,200 m)
- Rate of climb: 1,700 ft/min (8.6 m/s)
- Wing loading: 15.0 lb/sq ft (73 kg/m^{2})
