= Rotax 532 =

Austrian two-stroke aircraft engine

532
- Type: Piston aero-engine
- National origin: Austria
- Manufacturer: Rotax
- Major applications: Murphy Renegade; Merlin GT

The Rotax 532 is a 48 kW (64 hp) two-stroke, two-cylinder, rotary valve engine, liquid-cooled, gear reduction-drive engine that was formerly manufactured by BRP-Rotax GmbH & Co. KG. It was designed for use on ultralight aircraft.

== Design ==
The 532 features liquid-cooled cylinder heads and cylinders with a rotary valve inlet. Cooling is via one or two externally mounted radiators. Lubrication is by use of pre-mixed fuel and oil at 50:1. The 532 has a single Bosch flywheel magneto ignition system. It can be equipped with either one or two piston-type carburetors. It uses a manifold-driven pneumatic fuel pump to provide fuel pressure.

The engine's propeller drive is via a Rotax type B or C style gearbox. The standard engine includes a muffler exhaust system and an intake air filter. The standard starter is a recoil start type, with an electric starter optional. An integral alternating current generator produces 12 volts.

The Rotax 532 was replaced in production by the improved Rotax 582 engine design. The 582 increased the cylinder bore from the 532's 72 mm to 76 mm. This increased the displacement from 521.2 cc to 580.7 cc, an increase of 11%. The increased displacement flattened out the 532's torque curve and allowed the 582 to produce useful power over a wider rpm range. Reliability over the 532 was also improved.

== Applications ==
- Aero Designs Pulsar
- Aero Dynamics Sparrow Hawk
- AeroLites Bearcat
- Australian LightWing GR532
- Aviasud Mistral
- Avid Flyer
- Biplanes Of Yesteryear Mifyter
- Denney Kitfox Model 1
- Early Bird Jenny
- Macair Merlin GT
- Murphy Renegade
- Teratorn Tierra II
- Tiger Club Development Sherwood Ranger
- Wombat Gyrocopters Wombat

== Specifications (Rotax 532) ==
Reference: Raisner and Bombardier Rotax 532 Operator's Manual

=== General characteristics ===
- Type: 2-cylinder, 2-stroke, rotary valve, oil-in-fuel or oil-injected lubrication, dual carburetors, single ignition
- Bore: 72 mm (2.83 in)
- Stroke: 64 mm (2.40 in)
- Displacement: 521.2 cm³ (31.81 cu in)
- Dry weight: 46.8 kg 103.2 lb with recoil starter, two carburetors, full radiator, exhaust system and B gearbox

=== Components ===
- Valvetrain: rotary inlet valve, piston ported exhaust
- Fuel type: premium unleaded: RON 90 octane or higher leaded or unleaded or AVGAS 100 LL
- Oil system: oil-in-fuel (pre-mix) at 50:1
- Cooling system: liquid cooled

=== Performance ===
- Power output: 48 kW 64 HP SAE @ 6500 RPM
- Power-to-weight ratio: 0.62 hp/lb (0.99 kg/kW)

== See also ==
- Rotax aircraft engines
- Arrow 500
