= Biplanes of Yesteryear Mifyter =

American homebuilt aircraft

Mifyter

General information
- Type: Amateur-built aircraft
- National origin: United States
- Manufacturer: Biplanes Of Yesteryear
- Designer: Rod Cowgill
- Status: In production (2012)
- Number built: One

The Biplanes Of Yesteryear Mifyter (English: My Fighter) is an American amateur-built aircraft, designed by Rod Cowgill and produced by Biplanes Of Yesteryear, of Ontario, Oregon. The aircraft is supplied as a kit for amateur construction.

The design is "a fantasy one-of-a-kind design, not a scale" replica, but is intended to be similar to a First World War fighter.

== Design and development ==
The aircraft features a strut-braced biplane layout, a single-seat open cockpit, fixed conventional landing gear and a single engine in tractor configuration.

The aircraft is covered in doped aircraft fabric. Its 20.5 ft (6.2 m) span wing has a total area of 146 sq ft (13.6 m^{2}) on both wings. The prototype was powered by a 64 hp (48 kW) Rotax 532 with the newer 64 hp (48 kW) Rotax 582 two-stroke powerplant a builder option. Uniquely, for ground transportation and storage, instead of folding wings the aircraft features a removable tail section.

== Operational history ==
The design has won many awards, including Arlington Champion 1997, Oshkosh Honorable Mention 1997, Arlington Grand Champion 1999, and Oshkosh Reserve Grand Champion 2002.

As of December 2007 one example had been reported as having been completed and in April 2015 only one was registered with the Federal Aviation Administration.

A two-seat Myfyter II was planned and one example reported built, powered by a Geo Metro four stroke engine, although the company does not currently market it.

== Specifications (Mifyter) ==
Data from Bayerl, Biplanes Of Yesteryear and Kitplanes

General characteristics

- Crew: one
- Upper wingspan: 20 ft 6 in (6.25 m)
- Lower wingspan: 18 ft 6 in (5.64 m)
- Wing area: 146 sq ft (13.6 m^{2}) total
- Empty weight: 430 lb (195 kg)
- Gross weight: 755 lb (342 kg)
- Fuel capacity: 15 U.S. gallons (57 L; 12 imp gal)
- Powerplant: 1 × Rotax 532 twin cylinder, liquid-cooled, two stroke aircraft engine, 64 hp (48 kW)
- Propellers: 2-bladed wooden

Performance

- Maximum speed: 90 mph (140 km/h, 78 kn)
- Cruise speed: 75 mph (121 km/h, 65 kn)
- Stall speed: 37 mph (60 km/h, 32 kn)
- Rate of climb: 1,350 ft/min (6.9 m/s)
- Wing loading: 5.17 lb/sq ft (25.2 kg/m^{2})
