= Chris Julian (speedway rider) =

- Born: 4 March 1937; Fraddon, Cornwall, England
- Died: 17 May 1997 (aged 60); Kemble Airfield, Gloucestershire, England
- Nationality: British (English)

Career history
- 1960: Bristol Bulldogs
- 1961-62: Plymouth Bulldogs/Devils
- 1962: Neath Welsh Dragons
- 1963: St Austell Gulls
- 1964-65: Glasgow Tigers
- 1965-68: Cradley Heathens
- 1969: Newport Wasps
- 1970-75: Exeter Falcons
- 1975: Mildenhall Fen Tigers
- 1977: Weymouth Wizards

Team honours
- 1974: British League Champion

Christopher Denis Julian (4 March 1937 – 17 May 1997) was a motorcycle speedway rider from England.

== Racing career ==
Born in Fraddon, Cornwall, Julian began by riding grasstrack meetings in the West Country as a teenager then graduated to second half rides at Exeter speedway in 1959. He also had practice sessions at the St Austell speedway track where he was spotted by well known speedway rider and promoter Trevor Redmond who helped to get him a place in the Bristol team for the start of the Provincial League in 1960. His brief period at the Knowle stadium Bristol resulted in an average of 5.60 points per match in eight matches before the track closed. He then moved on to Pennycross Stadium in Plymouth where he started to gain a reputation for the ruthless riding style for which he would later become renowned.

Julian got into the sport at a time when many clubs were closing. In 1962, he rode for Plymouth, which closed at the end of that year and in 1963 at St Austell, where he had his best season to date and quickly became the Gulls' number one. At the end of 1963, St Austell closed and this left Julian once again without a team to ride for, however a call from his mentor Redmond led him to him join Glasgow for the 1964 season.

After a year riding for Glasgow, the 1000 mile round trip from his home in Cornwall to fulfil home match commitments proved too much and Julian put in for a transfer. He joined the Cradley Heath Heathens at the age of 28. His first season was a struggle, partly due to the stronger team lineups in the British League he was now competing in. The next season Julian shone in an under-performing Heathens team and increased his average by 1.5 points.

Notable achievements included his first full maximum on 7 May against Belle Vue and briefly holding the Silver Sash after beating Tommy Sweetman in July. He was also ever-present throughout the season. Julian continued to improve in the 1967 season scoring two maximums and twice beating the legendary Ove Fundin. The Cradley side was much stronger during the 1968 season and Rider Control allocated Julian to Newport for the start of the 1969 season much to the disappointment of many of the Heathens fans who had enjoyed his full throttle committed style.

== Gyroplane design ==
In the late 1980s, Julian designed an autogyro, the Julian Wombat, forming a company Wombat Gyrocopters to market kits for amateur construction. On 4 November 1991 the CAA issued the Wombat a restricted Permit to Test. After Julian's death in May 1997 in the crash of a different model gyroglider at the Kemble airfield, the design passed to former helicopter pilot Mark Harrisson in July 2000. Harrisson had intended to put the aircraft back into production, but in 2013 instead donated Julian's prototype to The Helicopter Museum in Weston-super-Mare, where it arrived on 9 July 2013.

Julian died in 1997 in a gyrocopter accident at age 60.
