= Aero Designs =

American aircraft manufacturer

Aero Designs Inc.
- Company type: Privately held company
- Industry: Aerospace
- Founded: before 1985
- Defunct: after 1992
- Fate: Out of business
- Headquarters: San Antonio, Texas, United States
- Products: Kit aircraft

Aero Designs was an American aircraft manufacturer based in San Antonio, Texas. The company specialized in the design and manufacture of composite kit aircraft.

Its sole design, the Aero Designs Pulsar was later produced by Skystar Aircraft of Nampa, Idaho and then by Pulsar Aircraft of El Monte, California. Each subsequent manufacturer introduced new variants.

== Aircraft ==
Model name	First flight	Number built	Type
Aero Designs Pulsar	1985		Two seat composite kit aircraft
Aero Designs Pulsar XP	1992		Improved model two seat composite kit aircraft
