= Wombat Gyrocopters =

British gyroplane manufacturer

- Company type: Privately held company
- Industry: Aerospace
- Founded: 1991
- Founder: Chris Julian
- Defunct: 1997
- Fate: Out of business following the death of the founder
- Headquarters: St Columb, Cornwall, United Kingdom
- Products: Kit aircraft

Wombat Gyrocopters was a British aircraft manufacturer based in St Columb, Cornwall and founded in 1991 by Chris Julian. The company specialized in the design and manufacture of autogyros in the form kits for amateur construction.

Julian was known as a motorcycle speedway racer. The company was formed by Julian to manufacture kits for his Wombat autogyro design. On 4 November 1991 the CAA issued the Wombat a restricted Permit to Test, allowing test flights to commence. In May 1997, when Julian was 60 years old, he was killed in the crash of a different model gyroglider at the Kemble airfield and that ended the enterprise.

After Julian's death the rights to the Wombat design passed in July 2000 to former helicopter pilot Mark Harrisson. Harrisson had intended to put the aircraft back into production, but this plan was not completed. In 2013 he donated the prototype to The Helicopter Museum in Weston-super-Mare, where it arrived on 9 July 2013 and remains on display in the autogyro section of the museum.

A total of four Wombats were registered in the United Kingdom with the CAA. All later had their registrations cancelled by the CAA.

== Aircraft ==
Summary of aircraft built by Wombat Gyrocopters
Model name	First flight	Number built	Type
Wombat Gyrocopters Wombat	1991	at least 4	Single seat autogyro
