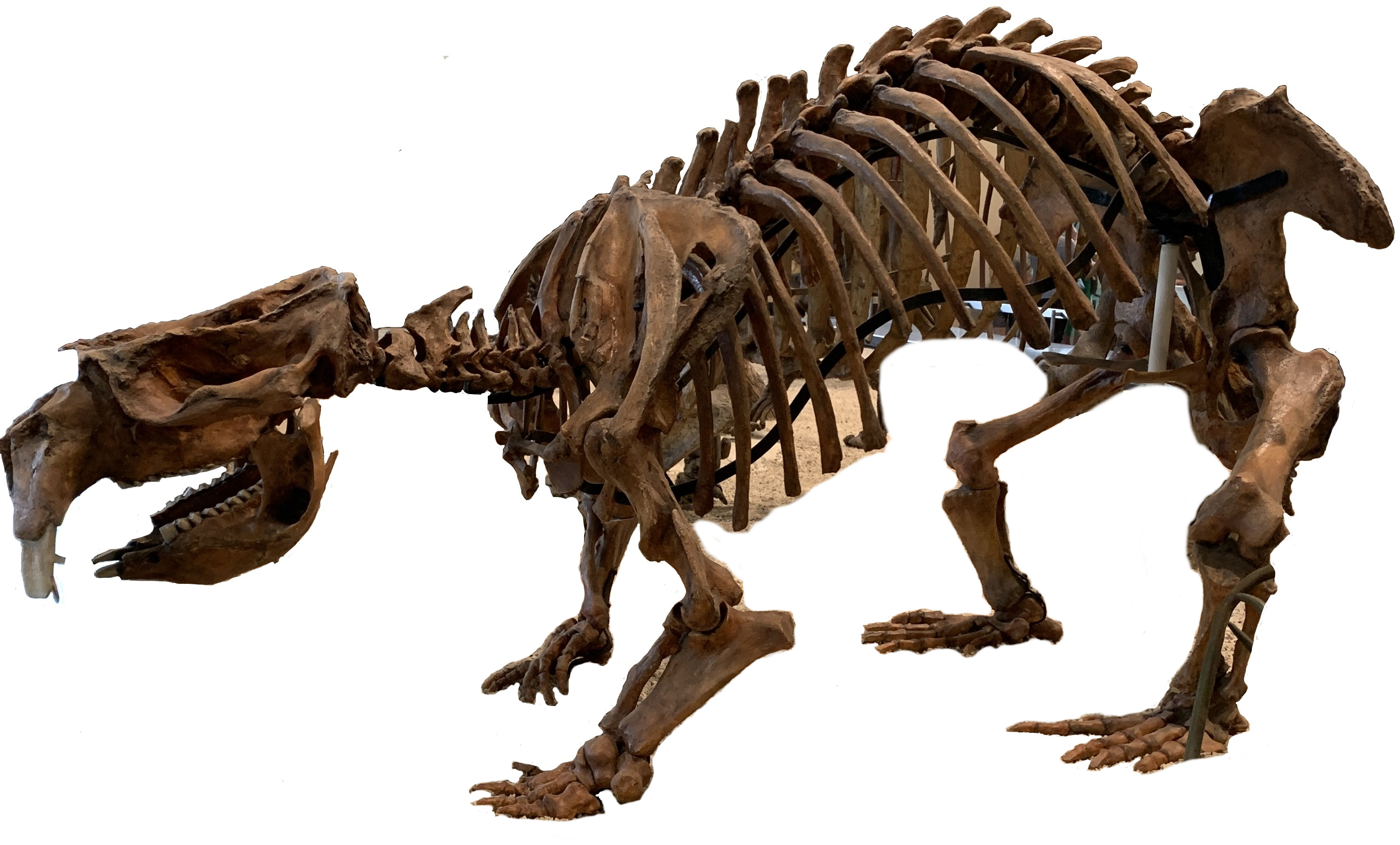
- Fossil cast at the American Museum of Natural History
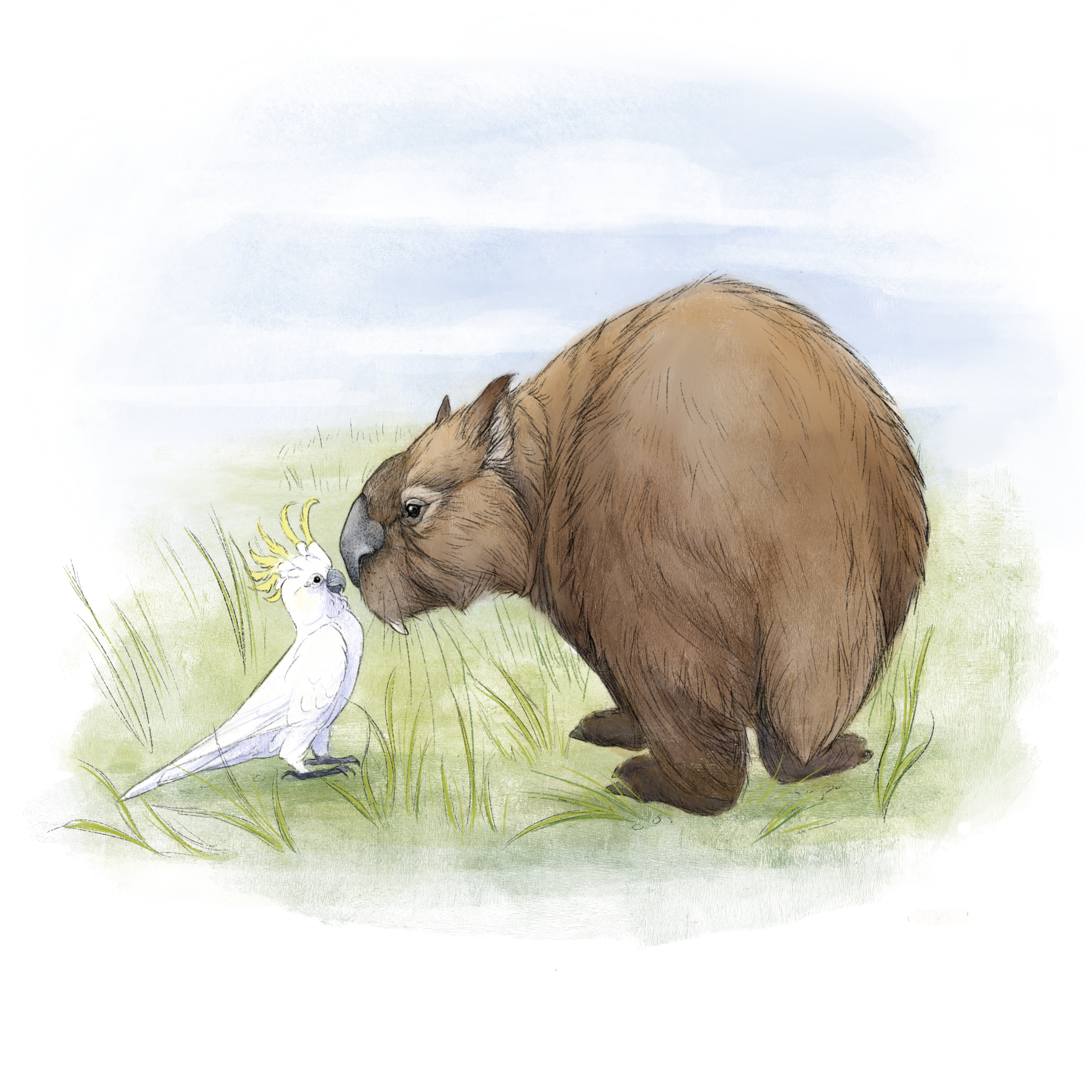
- Life restoration

Scientific classification
- Kingdom: Animalia
- Phylum: Chordata
- Class: Mammalia
- Infraclass: Marsupialia
- Order: Diprotodontia
- Family: Vombatidae
- Genus: †Phascolonus; Owen, 1872

Species
- P. gigas (Owen, 1859)

Synonyms
- Phascolomys magnus

= Phascolonus =

Phascolonus Temporal range: Pliocene–Late Pleistocene

Extinct genus of giant wombat

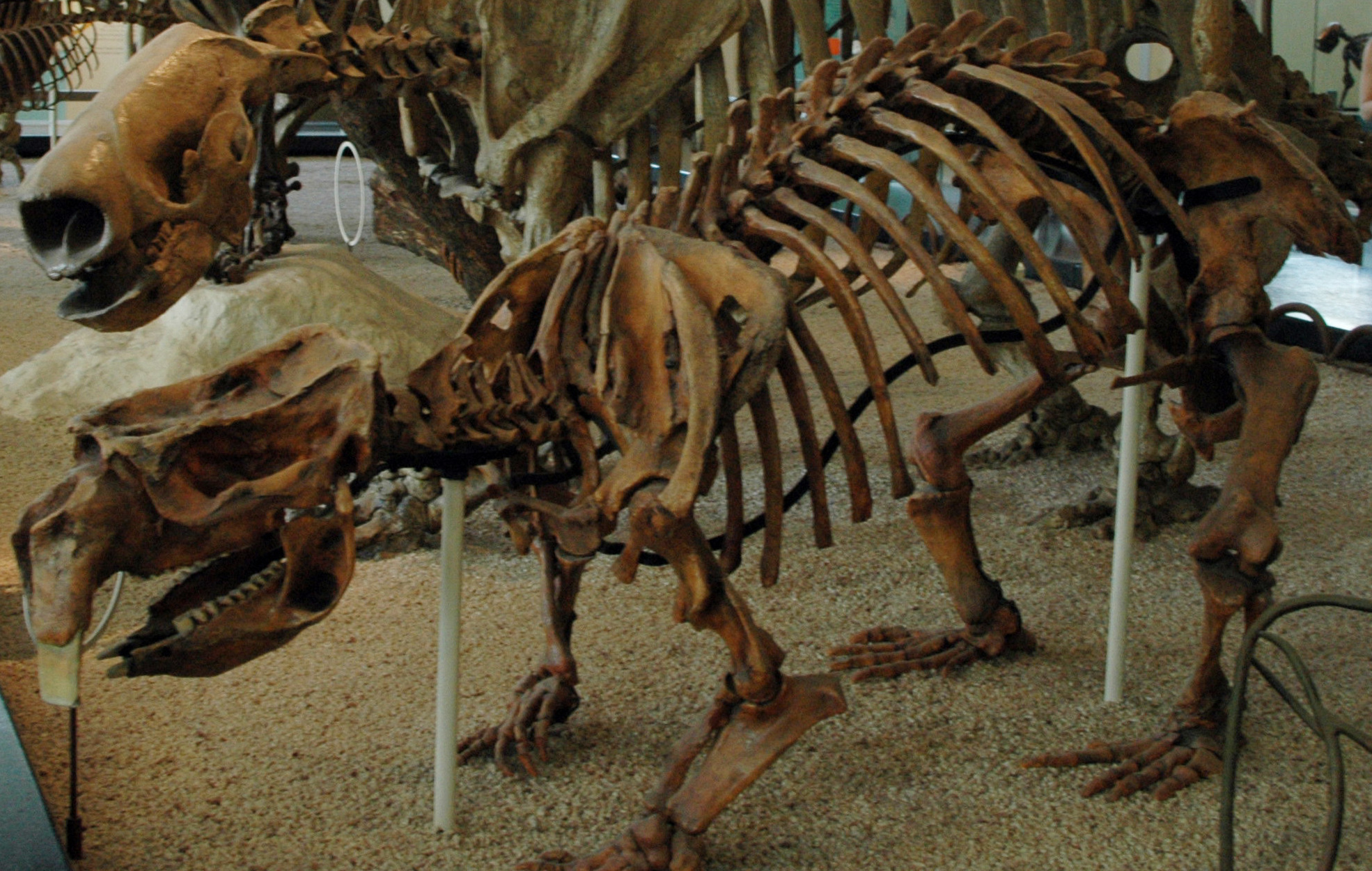
Alternative angle of AMNH cast

Phascolonus is an extinct genus of giant wombat known from the Pliocene and Pleistocene of Australia. There is only a single known species, Phascolonus gigas, the largest wombat ever known to have existed, estimated to weigh as much as 200 kg (450 lb) or 360 kg (790 lb). It was described by Richard Owen in 1859. Phascolomys magnus is a probable junior synonym. P. gigas is distinguished from other wombats by its strap-shaped upper incisors. The cranial roof also is noticeably inwardly depressed. The species was abundant across Australia, with remains having been found in all states except Western Australia. It is suggested to have had a preference for arid and semi-arid inland habitats, with a diet consisting of a high amount of low quality vegetation. Though it likely had wide home-ranges, it probably did not stray far from fresh water sources. Abundant remains have been found in Pleistocene aged deposits from Lake Callabonna in South Australia. Unlike its living relatives, it is unlikely that Phascolonus engaged in burrowing. Phascolonus disappeared during the Late Pleistocene Quaternary extinction event around 50-40,000 years ago, together with many other large Australian animals, following the arrival of humans to the Australian continent. Phylogenetic analysis suggests that is closely related to the other giant wombat genera Ramsayia and Sedophascolomys.
