= Sedophascolomys =

Sedophascolomys Temporal range: Pliocene–Late Pleistocene

Scientific classification
- Kingdom: Animalia
- Phylum: Chordata
- Class: Mammalia
- Infraclass: Marsupialia
- Order: Diprotodontia
- Family: Vombatidae
- Genus: †Sedophascolomys; Louys, 2015

Type species
- †Sedophascolomys medius (Owen, 1872)

Synonyms
- Phascolomys medius

Extinct genus of wombat

Sedophascolomys is an extinct genus of wombat known from the Pliocene and Pleistocene of Australia. There is a single recognised species, S. medius, which was formerly placed in the invalid genus Phascolomys. It was found in the northeastern and eastern regions of the continent. It is estimated to be somewhat larger than extant wombats, with a body mass of 70–75 kilograms (154–165 lb). The youngest remains of the genus date to the Late Pleistocene, around 50–40,000 years ago. It is thought to be closely related to the giant wombat genera Phascolonus and Ramsayia.
