= Wombat Gyrocopters Wombat =

British gyroplane

Wombat
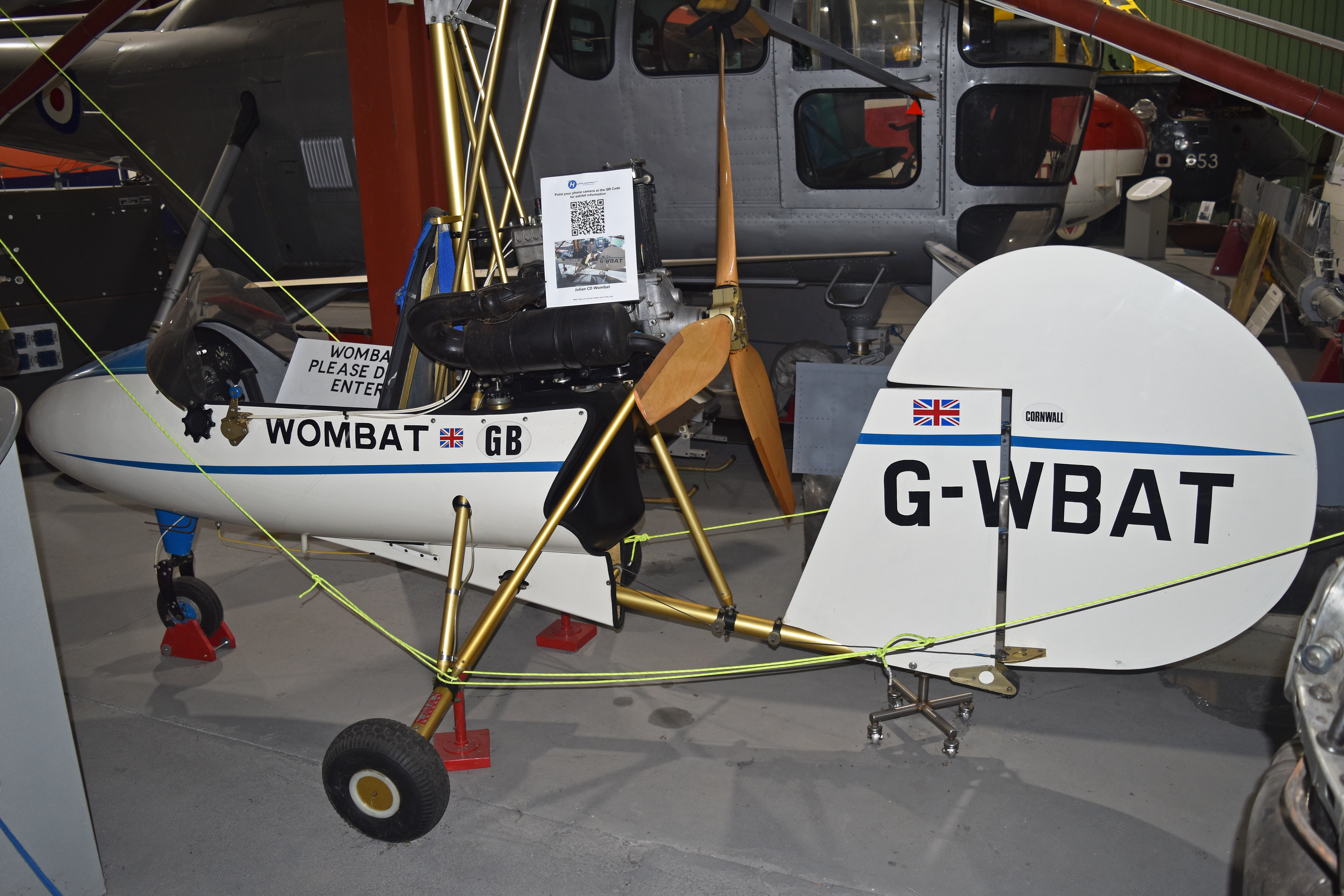

General information
- Type: Autogyro
- National origin: United Kingdom
- Manufacturer: Wombat Gyrocopters
- Designer: Chris Julian
- Status: Production completed (1997)
- Number built: At least four

History
- First flight: 1991

The Wombat Gyrocopters Wombat, sometimes called a Julian Wombat, is a British autogyro that was designed by Chris Julian and produced by Wombat Gyrocopters of St Columb, Cornwall, introduced in 1991. Now out of production, when it was available the aircraft was supplied as a kit for amateur construction.

== Development ==
Julian was known as a motorcycle speedway racer. He decided to design his own autogyro and on 4 November 1991 the CAA issued the Wombat a restricted Permit to Test. It was test flown at the St Merryn airfield in Cornwall. In May 1997, when Julian was 60 years old, he was killed in the crash of a different model gyroglider at the Kemble airfield.

After Julian's death the Wombat design rights passed to former helicopter pilot Mark Harrisson in July 2000. Harrisson had intended to put the aircraft back into production, but in 2013 instead donated the prototype to The Helicopter Museum in Weston-super-Mare, where it arrived on 9 July 2013.

== Design ==
The Wombat was designed to comply with the British Amateur-built aircraft rules. It features a single main rotor, a single-seat semi-enclosed cockpit with a cockpit fairing and windshield, tricycle landing gear, plus a tail caster and a twin cylinder, air-cooled, two-stroke, single-ignition 64 hp (48 kW) Rotax 532 engine in pusher configuration.

The aircraft fuselage is made from bolted-together aluminum tubing. Its two-bladed Dragon Wings aluminium rotor has a diameter of 22.83 ft (6.96 m), including a 2.53 ft (0.77 m) hub bar. Rotor cyclic control is via torque-tubes. The rudder is constructed with a composite skin over a foam core. The aircraft lacks a horizontal stabilizer.

The Wombat has a typical empty weight of 352 lb (160 kg). The standard day, sea level, no wind, take off with a 64 hp (48 kW) engine is 300 ft (91 m) and the landing roll is 3 ft (1 m).

== Operational history ==
In April 2015 no examples were registered in the United Kingdom with the CAA. Although a total of four had been registered at one time, all have had their registrations cancelled by the CAA.

== Aircraft on display ==
- The Helicopter Museum, Weston-super-Mare - prototype Wombat G-WBAT

== Specifications (Wombat) ==
Data from Purdy and Friends of The Helicopter Museum

General characteristics

- Crew: one
- Length: 12 ft 4 in (3.76 m)
- Empty weight: 352 lb (160 kg)
- Powerplant: 1 × Rotax 532 twin cylinder, liquid-cooled, two stroke aircraft engine, 64 hp (48 kW)
- Main rotor diameter: 22.83 ft (6.96 m)
- Main rotor area: 409 sq ft (38.0 m^{2})
- Propellers: 3-bladed GSC Systems wooden-bladed, ground adjustable

Performance

- Maximum speed: 87 mph (140 km/h, 76 kn)
- Cruise speed: 60 mph (97 km/h, 52 kn)
- Range: 190 mi (310 km, 170 nmi)
- Service ceiling: 10,000 ft (3,000 m)
- Rate of climb: 1,000 ft/min (5.1 m/s)

== See also ==
- List of rotorcraft
