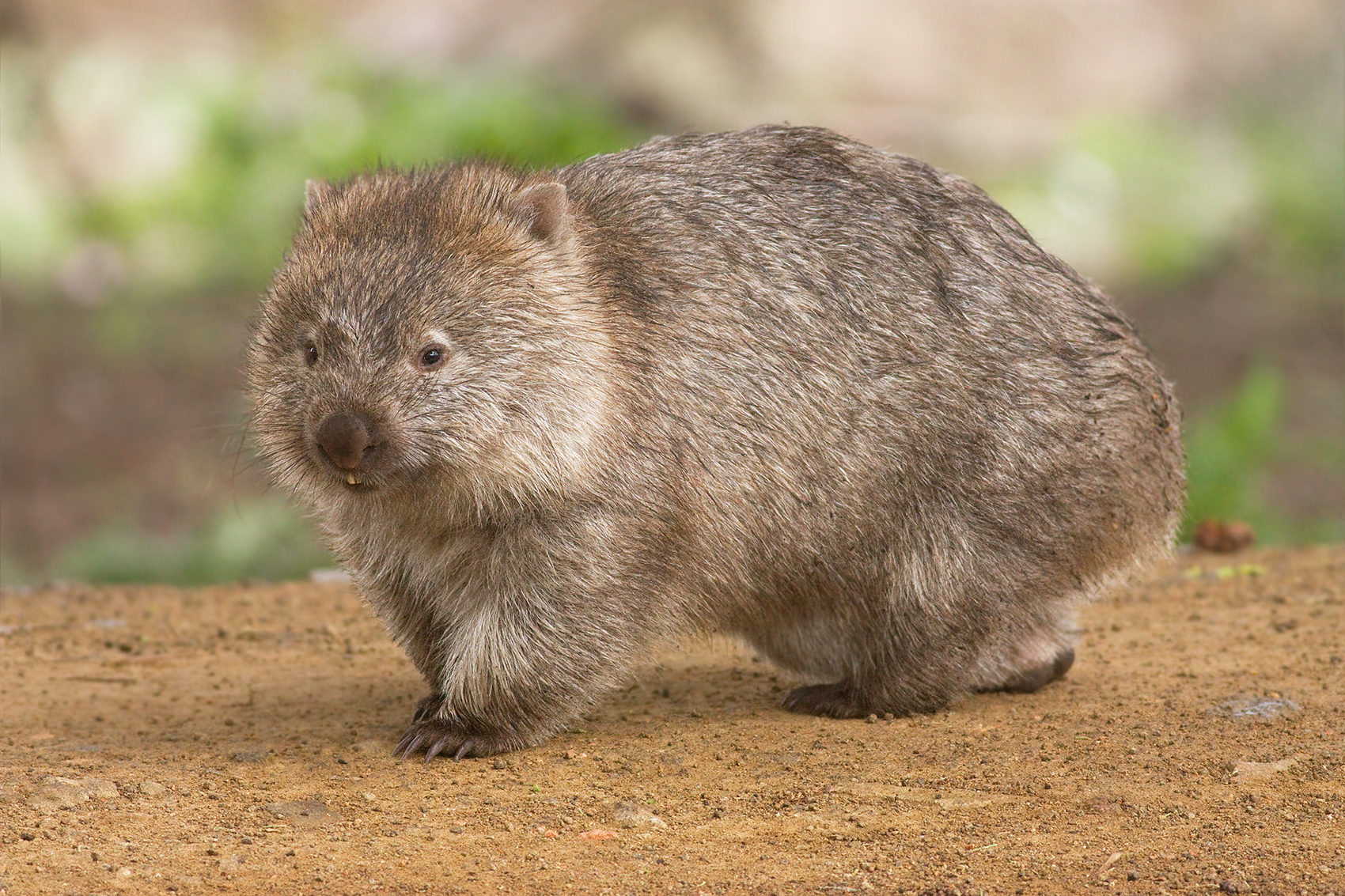
- Common wombat (Bass Strait); Maria Island, Tasmania

Scientific classification
- Kingdom: Animalia
- Phylum: Chordata
- Class: Mammalia
- Infraclass: Marsupialia
- Order: Diprotodontia
- Superfamily: Vombatoidea
- Family: Vombatidae; Burnett, 1830

Type genus
- Vombatus Geoffroy, 1803

Genera and species
- Vombatus; Vombatus ursinus; †Vombatus hacketti; Lasiorhinus; Lasiorhinus latifrons; Lasiorhinus krefftii; †Rhizophascolonus; †Phascolonus; †Warendja; †Ramsayia; †Sedophascolomys
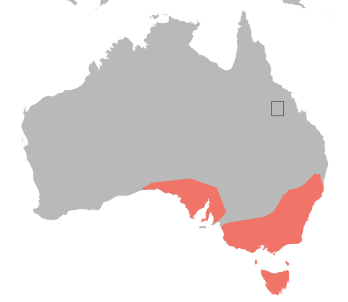
- Vombatidae distribution

= Wombat =

Wombat Temporal range: Late Oligocene – Recent

Family of marsupials native to Australia

Wombats are short-legged, muscular quadrupedal marsupials of the family Vombatidae that are native to Australia. Living species are about one metre (40 in) in length with small, stubby tails and weigh between 20 and 35 kg (44 and 77 lb). They are adaptable and habitat tolerant, and are found in forested, mountainous, and heathland areas of southern and eastern Australia, including Tasmania, as well as an isolated patch of about 300 ha (740 acres) in Epping Forest National Park in central Queensland.

== Etymology ==
The name "wombat" comes from the now nearly extinct Dharug language spoken by the aboriginal Dharug people, who originally inhabited the Sydney area. It was first recorded in January 1798, when John Price and James Wilson, Europeans who had adopted aboriginal ways, visited the area of what is now Bargo, New South Wales. Price wrote: "We saw several sorts of dung of different animals, one of which Wilson called a 'Whom-batt', which is an animal about 20 inches [51 cm] high, with short legs and a thick body with a large head, round ears, and very small eyes; is very fat, and has much the appearance of a badger." Wombats were often called badgers by early settlers because of their size and habits. Because of this, localities such as Badger Creek, Victoria, and Badger Corner, Tasmania, were named after the wombat. The spelling went through many variants over the years, including "wambat", "whombat", "womat", "wombach", and "womback".

== Evolution and taxonomy ==
Though genetic studies of the Vombatidae have been undertaken, evolution of the family is not well understood. Wombats are estimated to have diverged from other Australian marsupials relatively early, as long as 40 million years ago, while some estimates place divergence at around 25 million years. Some prehistoric wombat genera greatly exceeded modern wombats in size. The largest known wombat, Phascolonus, which went extinct approximately 40,000 years ago, is estimated to have had a body mass of up to 360 kilograms (790 lb).

== Characteristics ==
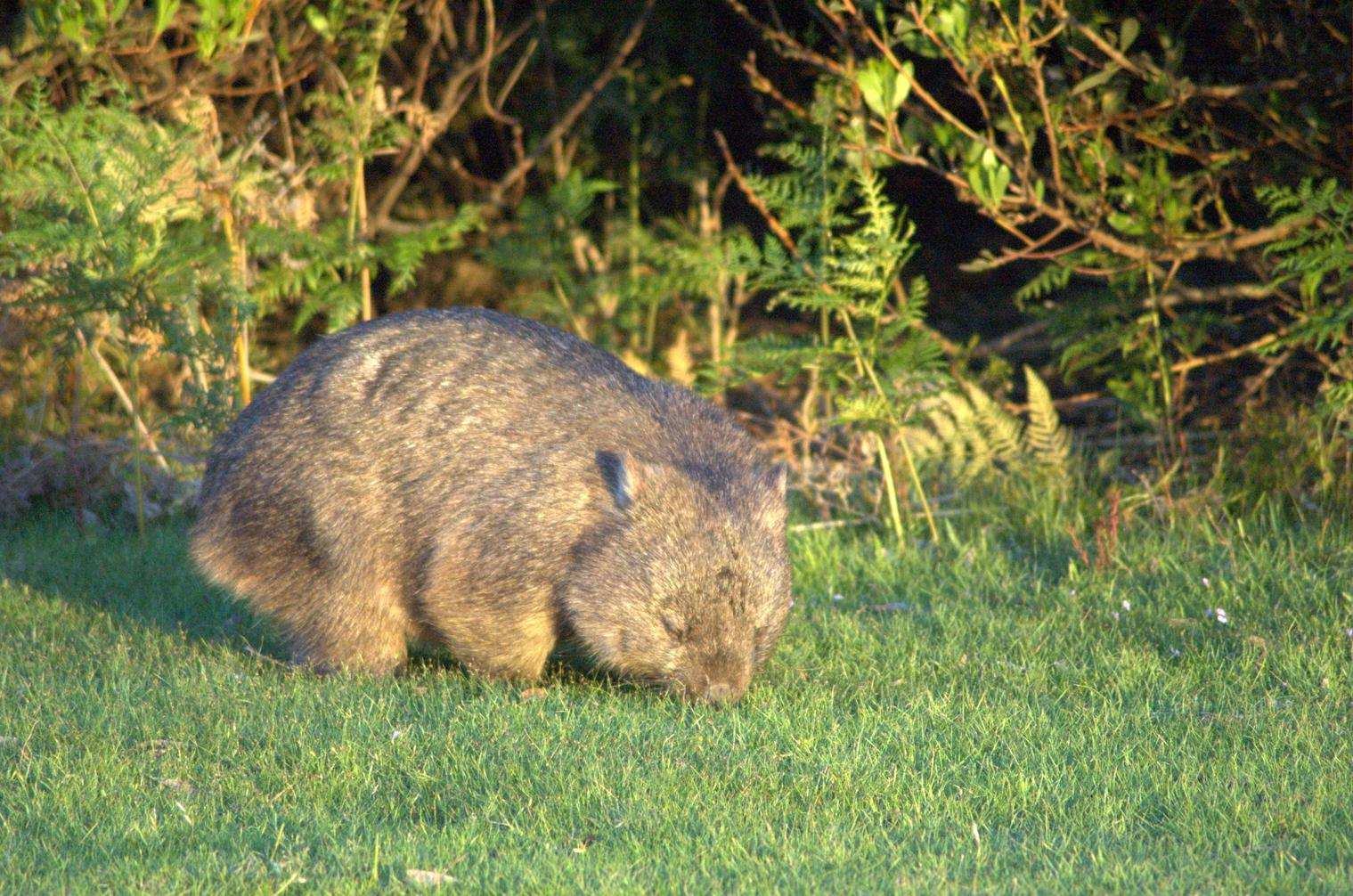
Tasmanian wombat in Narawntapu National Park, Tasmania

Wombats dig extensive burrow systems with their rodent-like front teeth and powerful claws. One distinctive adaptation of wombats is their backward pouch. The advantage of a backward-facing pouch is that when digging, the wombat does not gather soil in its pouch over its young. Although mainly crepuscular and nocturnal, wombats may also venture out to feed on cool or overcast days. They are not commonly seen, but leave ample evidence of their passage, treating fences as minor inconveniences to be gone through or under.

Wombats leave distinctive cube-shaped faeces. As wombats arrange these feces to mark territories and attract mates, it is believed that the cubic shape makes them more stackable and less likely to roll, which gives this shape a biological advantage. The method by which the wombat produces them is not well understood, but it is believed that the wombat intestine stretches preferentially at the walls, with two flexible and two stiff areas around its intestines. The adult wombat produces between 80 and 100, 2 cm (0.8 in) pieces of feces in a single night, and four to eight pieces each bowel movement. In 2019, the production of cube-shaped wombat feces was the subject of the Ig Nobel Prize for Physics, won by Patricia Yang and David Hu.

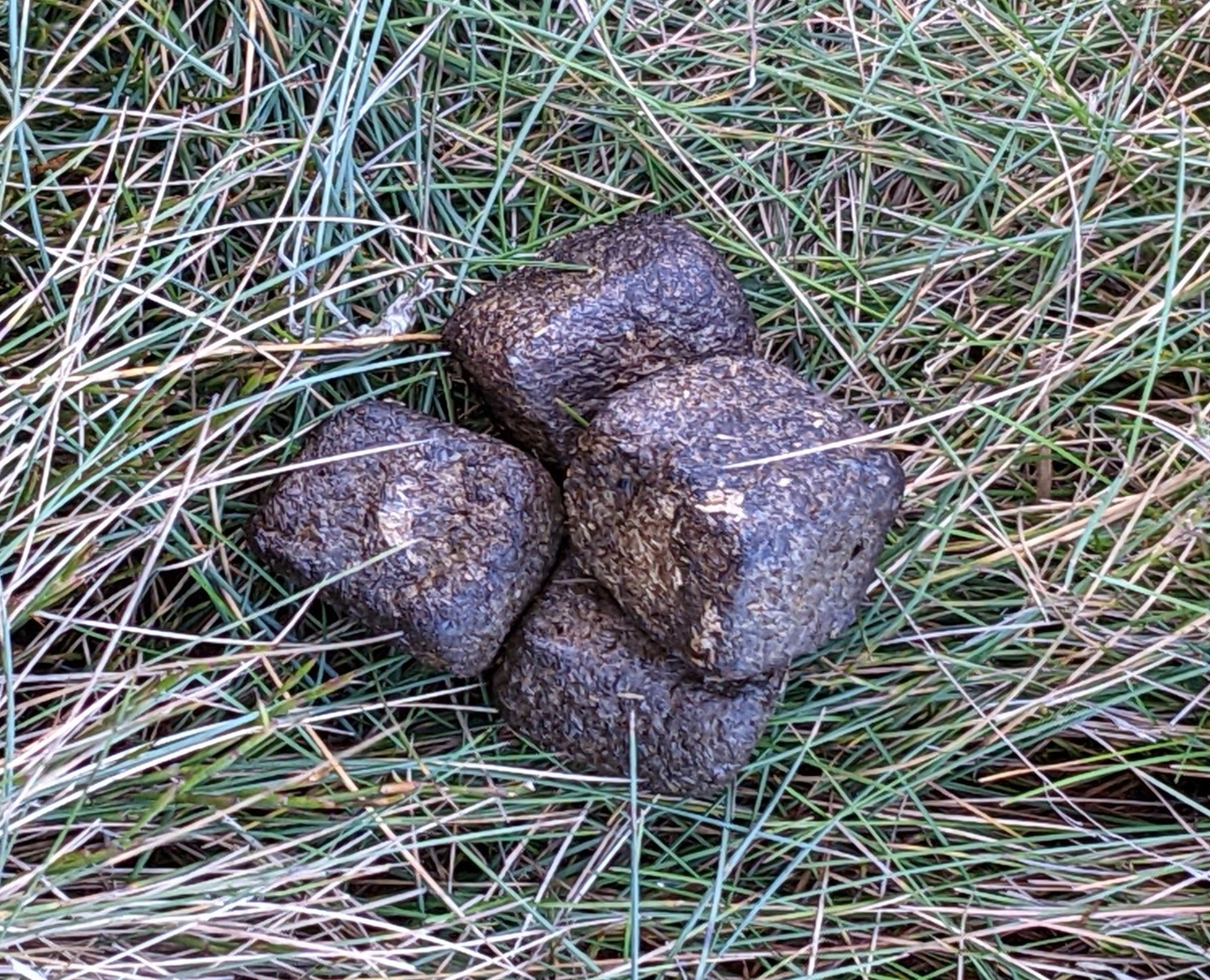
Wombat cubic scat

All wombat teeth lack roots and are ever-growing, like the incisors of rodents. Wombats are herbivores; their diets consist mostly of grasses, sedges, herbs, bark, and roots. Their incisor teeth somewhat resemble those of rodents (rats, mice, etc.), being adapted for gnawing tough vegetation. Like many other herbivorous mammals, they have a large diastema between their incisors and the cheek teeth, which are relatively simple. The dental formula of wombats is 1.0.1.41.0.1.4 × 2 = 24.

Wombats' fur can vary from a sandy colour to brown, or from grey to black. All three known extant species average around 1 metre (3 ft 3 in) in length and weigh between 20 and 35 kg (44 and 77 lb).

Male wombats have penile spines, a non-pendulous scrotum, and three pairs of bulbourethral glands. The testes, prostate, and bulbourethral glands enlarge during the breeding season. Female wombats give birth to a single young after a gestation period of roughly 20–30 days, which varies between species. All species have well-developed pouches, which the young leave after about six to seven months. Wombats are weaned after 15 months, and are sexually mature at 18 months.

A group of wombats has been called a wisdom, a mob, or a colony, but are better known as solitary animals.

Wombats typically live up to 15 years in the wild, but can live past 20 and even 30 years in captivity. The longest-lived captive wombat lived to 34 years of age.

In 2020, biologists discovered that wombats, like many other Australian marsupials, display bio-fluorescence under ultraviolet light.

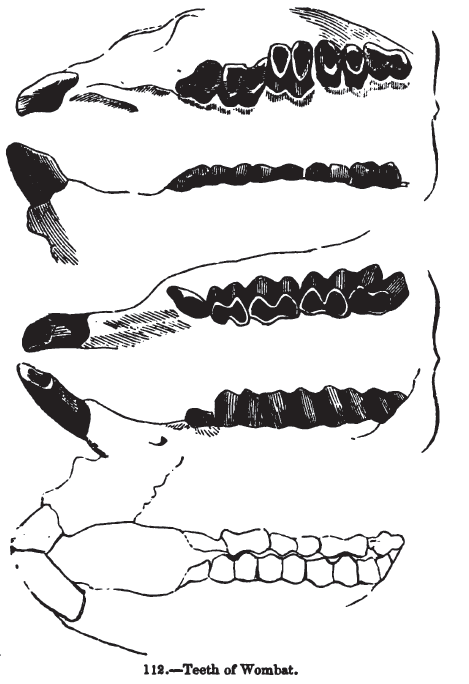
Dentition, as illustrated in Knight's Sketches in Natural History

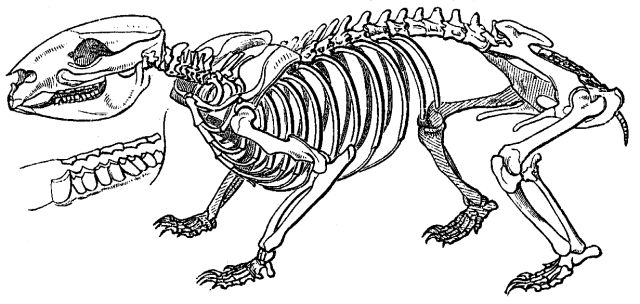
Wombat skeleton

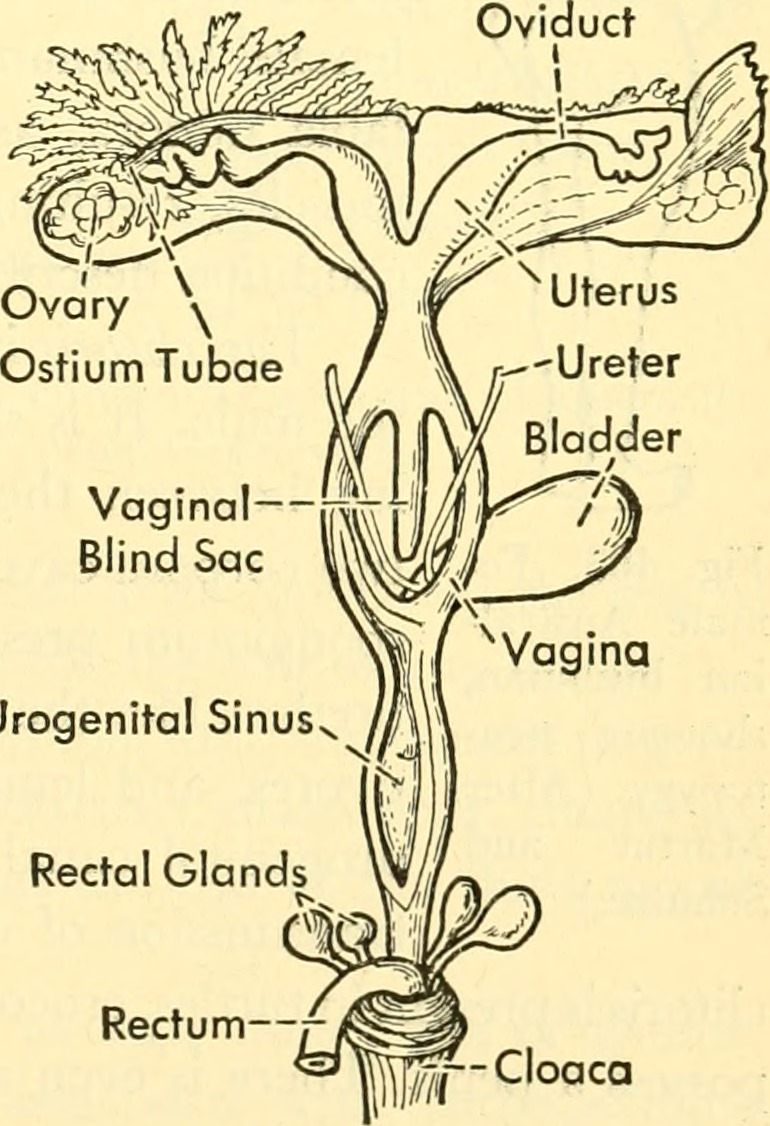
Female reproductive tract

== Ecology and behaviour ==
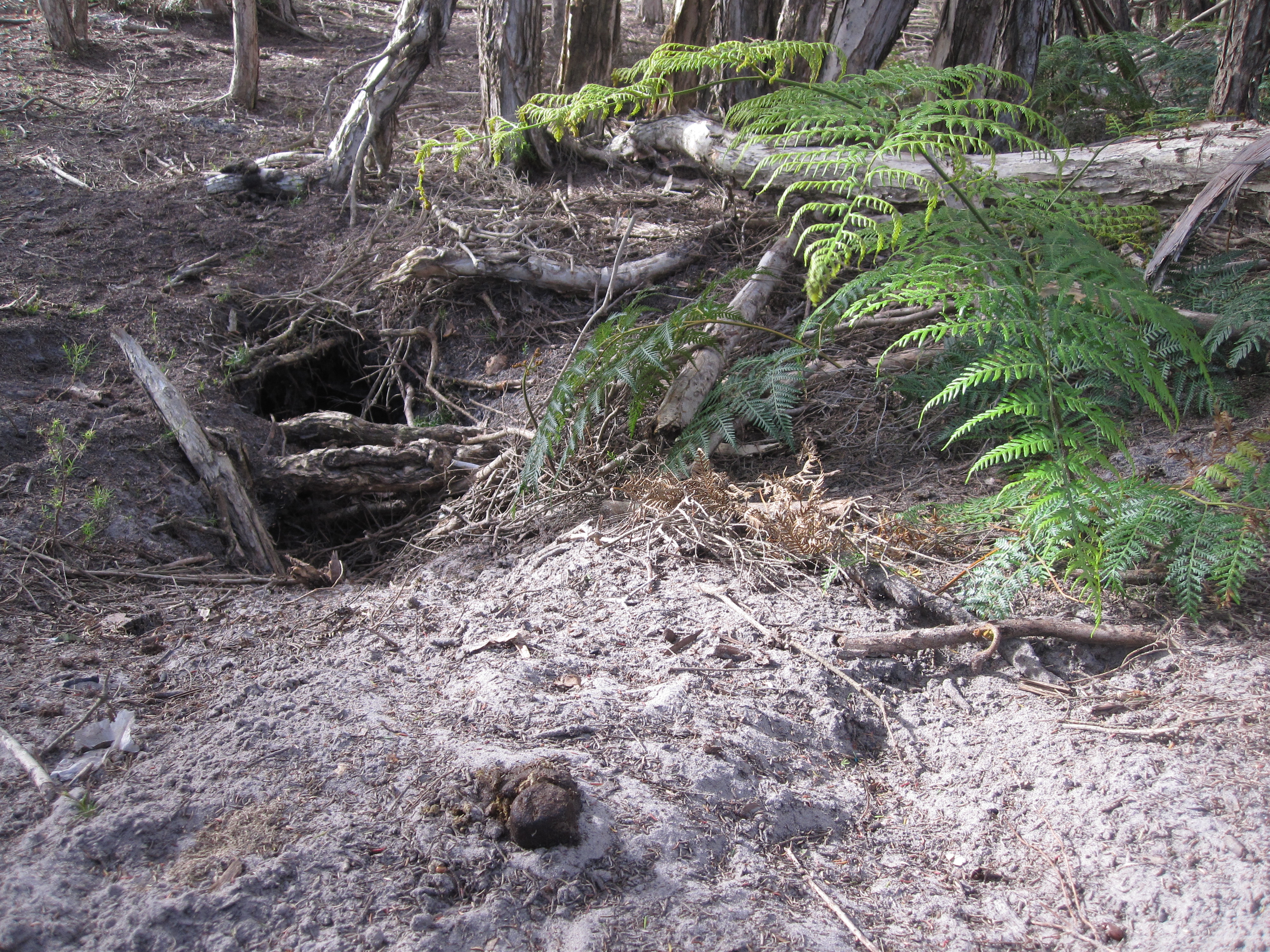
Wombat burrow and scat, Narawntapu National Park, Tasmania

Wombats have an extraordinarily slow metabolism, taking around 8 to 14 days to complete digestion, which aids their survival in arid conditions. They generally move slowly. Wombats defend home territories centred on their burrows, and they react aggressively to intruders. The common wombat occupies a range of up to 23 ha (57 acres), while the hairy-nosed species have much smaller ranges, of no more than 4 ha (10 acres).

Dingos and Tasmanian devils prey on wombats. Extinct predators were likely to have included Thylacoleo and possibly the thylacine (Tasmanian tiger). Their primary defence is their toughened rear hide, with most of the posterior made of cartilage. This, combined with its lack of a meaningful tail, makes it difficult for any predator that follows the wombat into its tunnel to bite and injure its target. When attacked, wombats dive into a nearby tunnel, using their rumps to block a pursuing attacker. According to an urban legend, wombats sometimes allow an intruder to force its head over the wombat's back, and then use its powerful legs to crush the skull of the predator against the roof of the tunnel. However, there is no evidence to support this.

Wombats are generally quiet animals. Bare-nosed wombats can make a number of different sounds, more than the hairy-nosed wombats. Wombats tend to be more vocal during mating season. When angered, they can make hissing sounds. Their call sounds somewhat like a pig's squeal. They can also make grunting noises, a low growl, a hoarse cough, and a clicking noise.

== Species ==
The three extant species of wombat are all endemic to Australia and a few offshore islands. They are protected under Australian law.

- Common wombat (Vombatus ursinus), which has three subspecies:
  - Vombatus ursinus hirsutus, found on the Australian mainland
  - Vombatus ursinus tasmaniensis, found in Tasmania
  - Vombatus ursinus ursinus, found on Flinders Island in the Bass Strait and Maria Island in the Tasman Sea.
- Northern hairy-nosed wombat or yaminon (Lasiorhinus krefftii), which is critically endangered
- Southern hairy-nosed wombat (Lasiorhinus latifrons), the smallest of the three species

== Human relations ==
=== History ===
Depictions of the animals in rock art are exceptionally rare, though examples estimated to be up to 4,000 years old have been discovered in Wollemi National Park. The wombat is depicted in aboriginal Dreamtime as an animal of little worth. The mainland stories tell of the wombat as originating from a person named Warreen whose head had been flattened by a stone and tail amputated as punishment for selfishness. In contrast, the Tasmanian aboriginal story first recorded in 1830 tells of the wombat (known as the drogedy or publedina) the great spirit Moihernee had asked hunters to leave alone. In both cases, the wombat is regarded as having been banished to its burrowing habitat. Estimates of wombat distribution prior to European settlement are that numbers of all three surviving species were prolific and that they covered a range more than ten times greater than that of today.

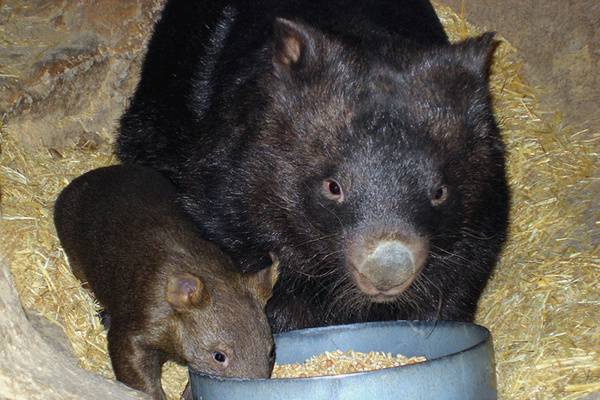
Common wombat and joey eating from a bowl at a zoo

After the ship Sydney Cove ran aground on Clarke Island in February 1797, the crew of the salvage ship Francis discovered wombats on the island. A live animal was taken back to Port Jackson. Matthew Flinders, who was travelling on board the Francis on its third and final salvage trip, also decided to take a wombat specimen from the island to Port Jackson. Governor John Hunter later sent the animal's corpse to Joseph Banks at the Literary and Philosophical Society to verify that it was a new species. The island was named Clarke Island after William Clark.

Wombats were classified as vermin in 1906, and a bounty was introduced in 1925. This and the removal of a substantial amount of habitat have greatly reduced their numbers and range.

=== Attacks on humans ===
In addition to being bitten, humans can receive puncture wounds from wombat claws. Startled wombats can also charge humans and bowl them over, with the attendant risks of broken bones from the fall. One naturalist, Harry Frauca, once received a bite 2 cm (0.8 in) deep into the flesh of his leg—through a rubber boot, trousers and thick woollen socks. A UK newspaper, The Independent, reported that on 6 April 2010, a 59-year-old man from rural Victoria state was mauled by a wombat (thought to have been angered by mange), causing a number of cuts and bite marks requiring hospital treatment. He resorted to killing it with an axe.

=== Cultural significance ===
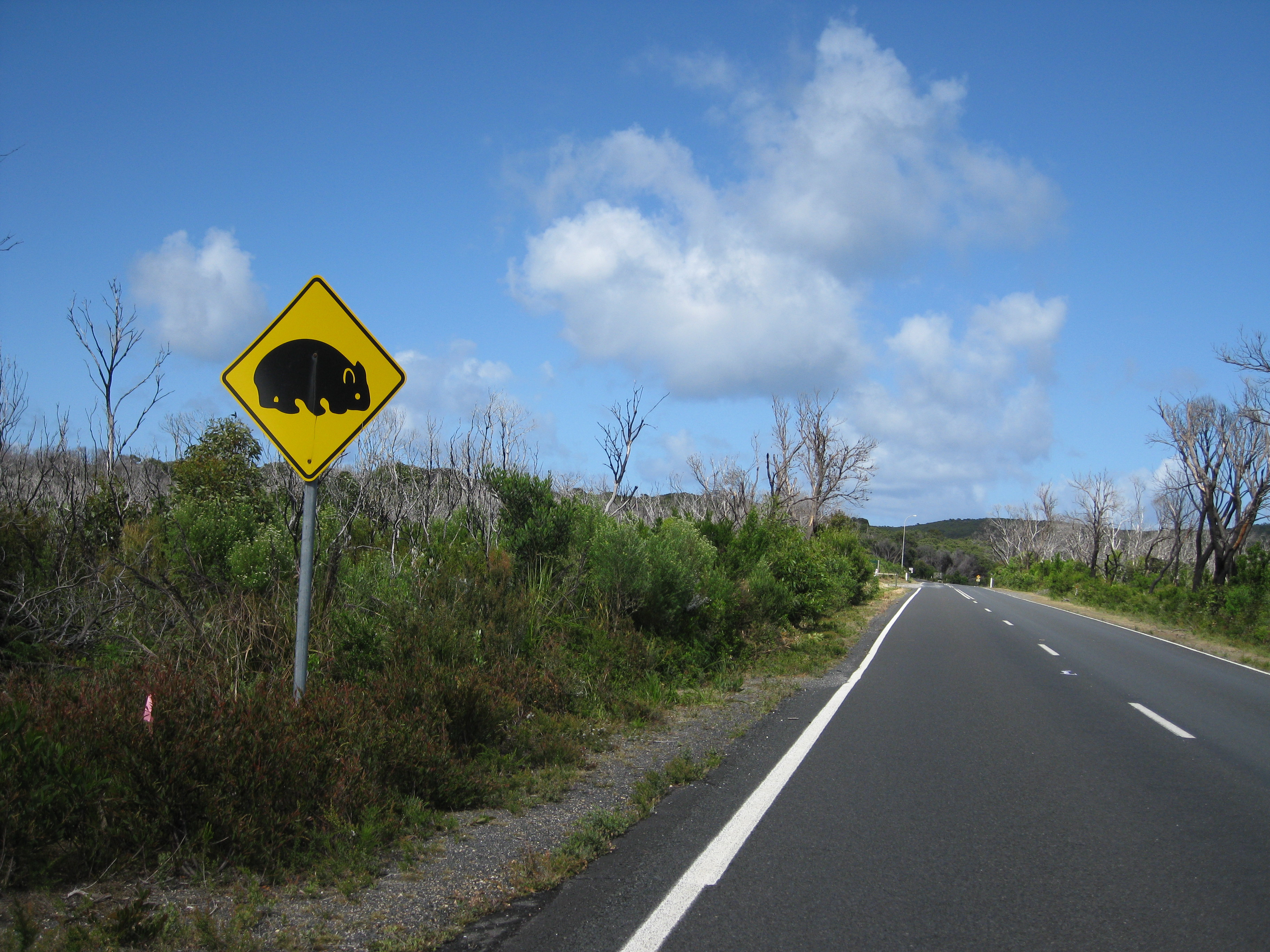
Traffic sign

Farmers consider common wombats to be a nuisance due primarily to their burrowing behaviour. Wombats on the road are a hazard for incautious drivers, and collision with one can not only kill or maim the animal but incapacitate a vehicle.

"Fatso the Fat-Arsed Wombat" was the tongue-in-cheek "unofficial" mascot of the 2000 Sydney Olympics. Since 2005, an unofficial holiday called Wombat Day has been observed on 22 October.

Wombat meat has been a source of bush food from the arrival of Aboriginal Australians to the arrival of Europeans. Due to the protection of the species, wombat meat as food is no longer part of mainstream Australian cuisine, but wombat stew was once one of the few truly Australian dishes. In the 20th century, the more easily found rabbit meat was more commonly used. (Rabbits are now considered an invasive pest in Australia.) The name of the dish is also used by a popular children's book and musical.

Wombats have featured in Australian postage stamps and coins. The hairy-nosed wombats have featured mainly to highlight their elevated conservation status. The northern hairy-nosed wombat featured on an Australian 1974 20-cent stamp and also an Australian 1981 five-cent stamp. The common wombat has appeared on a 1987 37-cent stamp and an Australian 1996 95-cent stamp. The 2006 Australian Bush Babies stamp series features an AU$1.75-stamp of a baby common wombat, and the 2010 Rescue to Release series features a 60-cent stamp of a common wombat being treated by a veterinarian. Wombats are rarely seen on circulated Australian coins, an exception is a 50-cent coin which also shows a koala and lorikeet. The common wombat appeared on a 2005 commemorative $1 coin and the northern hairy-nosed wombat on a 1998 Australia Silver Proof $10 coin.

Many places in Australia have been named after the wombat, including a large number of places where they are now locally extinct in the wild. References to the locally extinct common wombat can be found in parts of the Central Highlands of Victoria, for example the Wombat State Forest and Wombat Hill in Daylesford. Other significant places named after the wombat includes the town of Wombat, New South Wales and the suburb of Quoiba, Tasmania. Numerous less significant Australian places, including hotels, are named after the animals. Prominent sculptures of wombats include in South Australia: "The Big Wombat" at Scotdesco Aboriginal Community (Tjilkaba) and Wudinna visitor information centre, Adelaide Zoo and Norwood; New South Wales: Wombat, New South Wales; Victoria: Daylesford, Trentham, Victoria and Kinglake; Tasmania: Steppes State Reserve.

Wombats have also been a feature of Australian television. While wombats are not generally kept as pets, a notable depiction of a common wombat as a pet is Fatso from the Australian television show A Country Practice. The Brisbane television show Wombat was also named for the animals.

Australian literature contains many references to the wombat. Examples are Mr. Walter Wombat from the adventures of Blinky Bill and one of the main antagonists in The Magic Pudding by Norman Lindsay. The Muddle-Headed Wombat by Ruth Park is a loved book for children and was a popular radio serial, starring John Ewart.

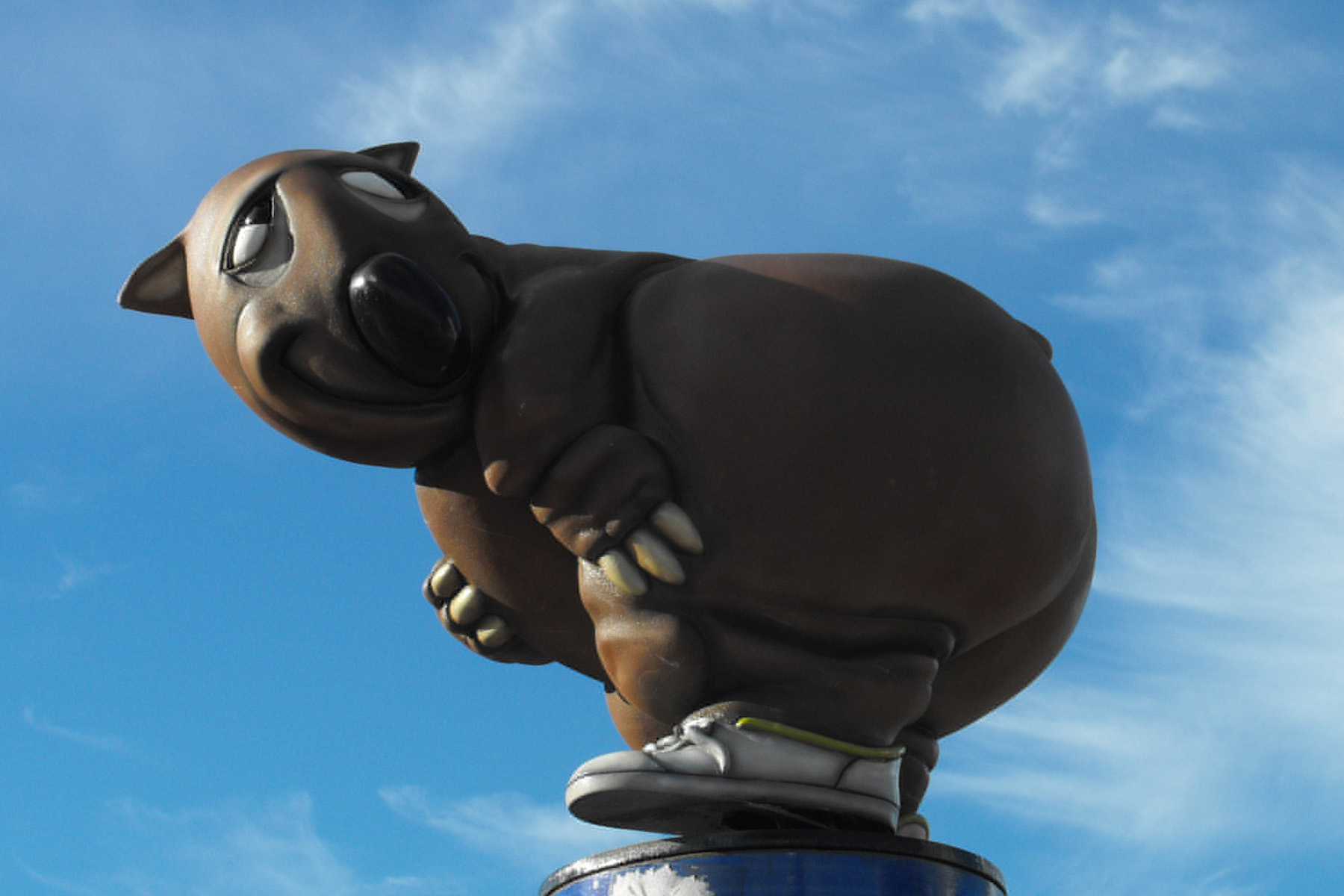
Side view of "Fatso the Fat-Arsed Wombat", an unofficial mascot for the 2000 Summer Olympics as he appeared on top of a pole outside Sydney's Stadium Australia

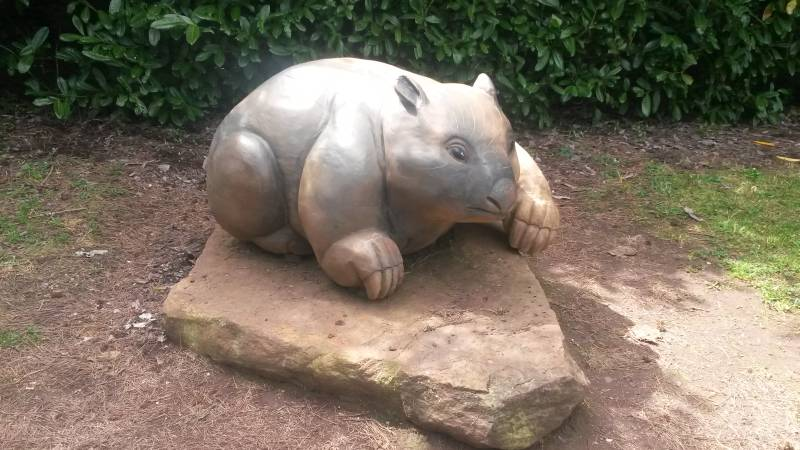
Wombat sculpture, Wombat Hill Botanic Gardens, Daylesford, Victoria

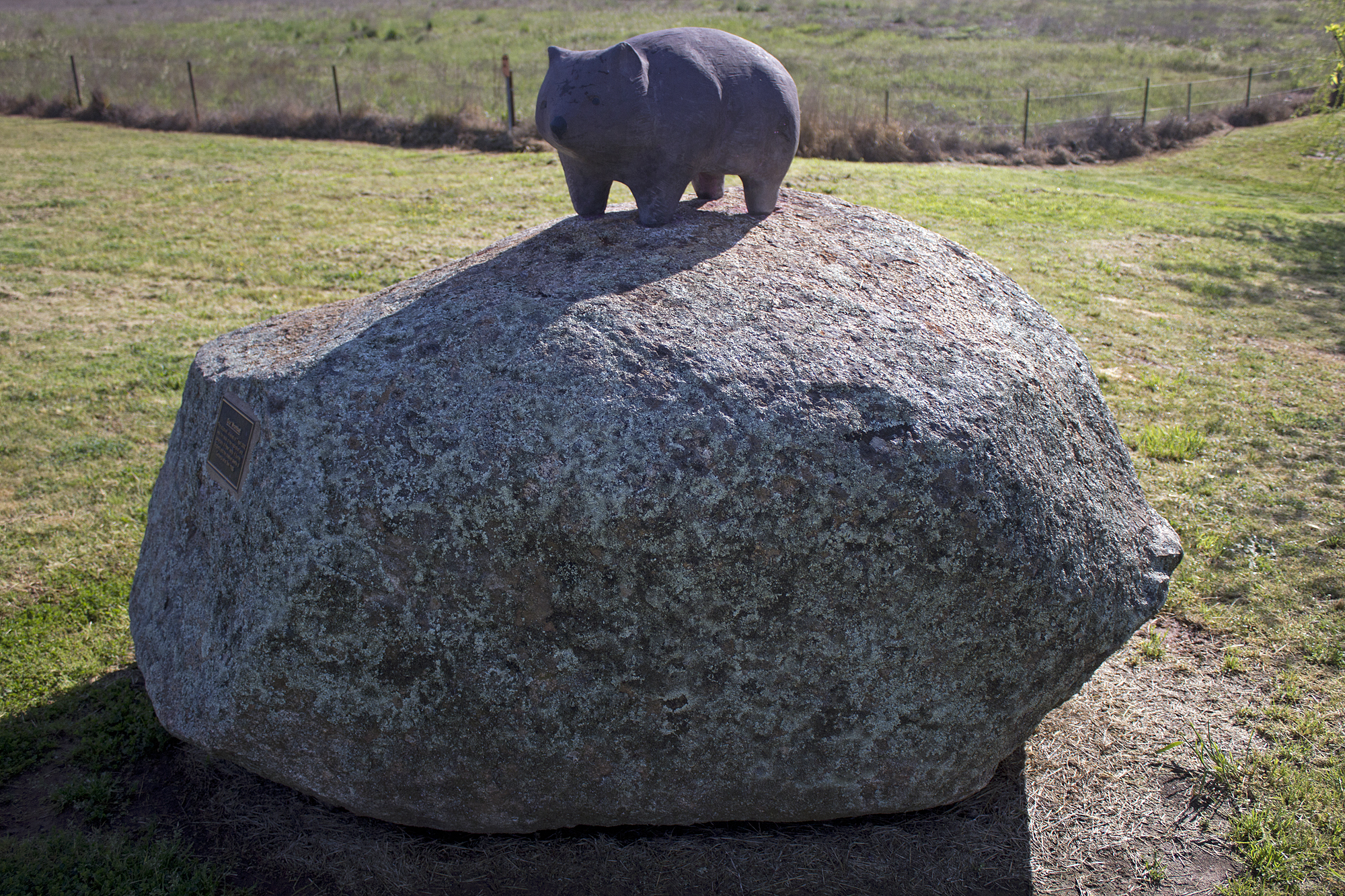
Wombat sculpture, Wombat, New South Wales, unveiled April 2002

== Conservation ==
All species of wombats are protected in every Australian state.

The northern hairy-nosed wombat is a critically endangered species under Queensland's Nature Conservation Act 1992, the Commonwealth Environment Protection and Biodiversity Conservation Act 1999, and on the International Union for Conservation of Nature's Red List of Threatened Species. The biggest threats the species faces are its small population size, predation by wild dogs, competition for food because of overgrazing by cattle and sheep, and disease. The only known wild populations of this species exist in two locations in Queensland, the Epping Forest National Park, and a smaller colony being established by translocating wombats to the Richard Underwood Nature Refuge at Yarran Downs. This second colony is being created through the Xstrata reintroduction project, which is being funded by Xstrata, a Swiss global mining company. From a low of just 35 wombats across the state when surveyed in the 1980s, the population had increased to a total of around 315 by May 2021.

Despite its name, the common wombat is no longer as common as it once was, and is under significant threat. However, in eastern Victoria, they are not protected, and they are considered by some to be pests, especially due to the damage they cause to rabbit-proof fences. Opportunistic research studies have been conducted on the immune system of common wombats, which could be used as a tool for future conservation efforts.

WomSAT, a citizen science project, was established in 2016 to record sightings of wombats across the country. The website and mobile phone app can be used to log sightings of live or deceased wombats and wombat burrows. Since its establishment the project has recorded over 23,000 sightings across New South Wales, Victoria, Tasmania and South Australia. More recently, the citizen science project has published findings on wombat roadkill and sarcoptic mange incidence across Australia.
