= De Soto, Iowa =

- City
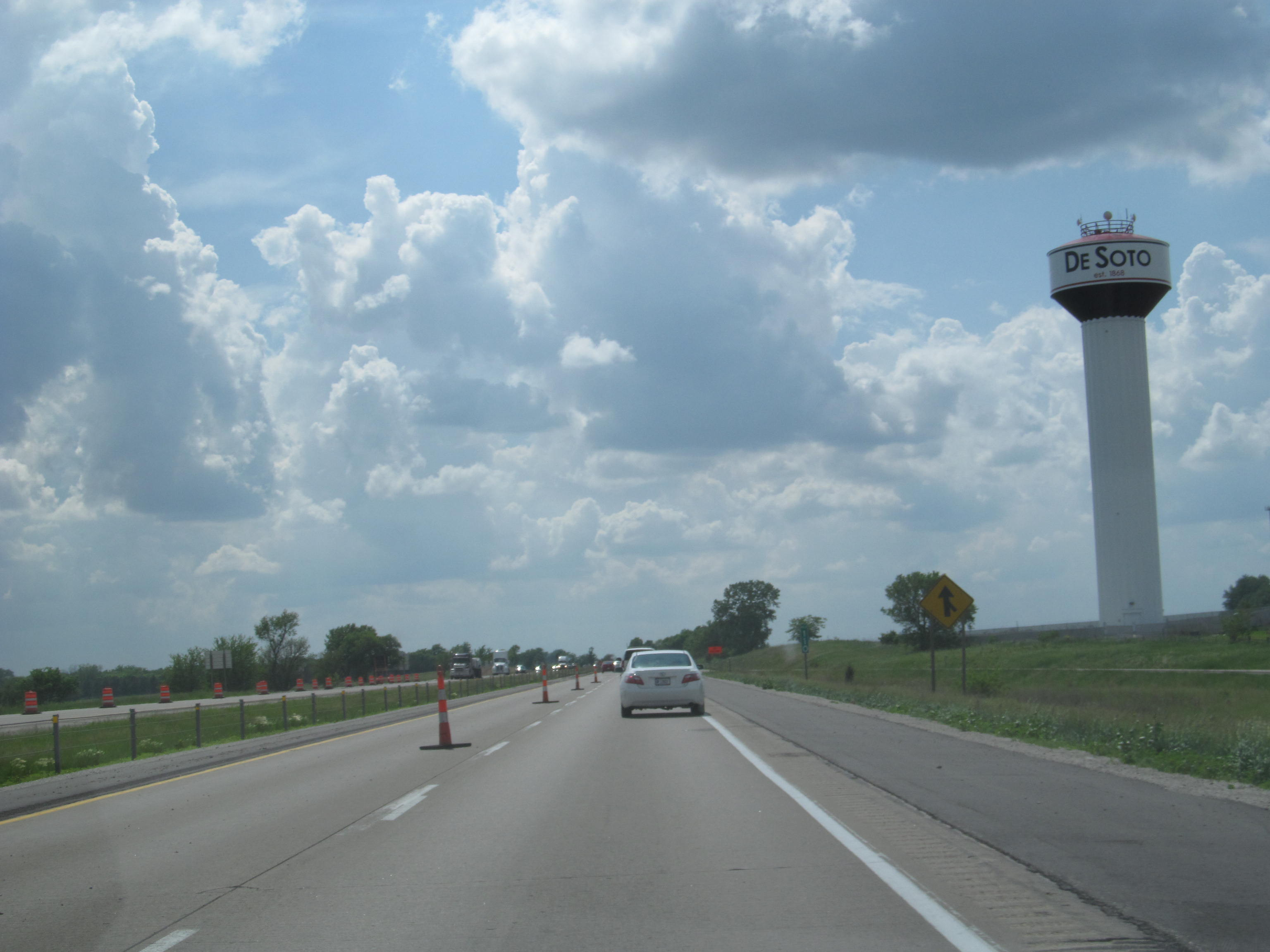
- De Soto water tower along Interstate 80

- Location of De Soto, Iowa
- Coordinates: 41°32′24″N 94°00′07″W
- Country: United States
- State: Iowa
- County: Dallas

Area
  - Total: 1.75 sq mi (4.53 km^{2})
  - Land: 1.75 sq mi (4.52 km^{2})
  - Water: 0.0039 sq mi (0.01 km^{2})
- Elevation: 971 ft (296 m)

Population (2020)
  - Total: 915
  - Density: 523.9/sq mi (202.28/km^{2})
- Time zone: UTC-6 (Central (CST))
  - Summer (DST): UTC-5 (CDT)
- ZIP code: 50069
- Area code: 515
- FIPS code: 19-21045
- GNIS feature ID: 2394474
- Website: http://desoto-ia.org/

De Soto is a city in Dallas County, Iowa, United States. The population was 915 at the time of the 2020 census. It is part of the Des Moines–West Des Moines Metropolitan Statistical Area.

== History ==
De Soto got its start in the year 1868, following construction of the Chicago, Rock Island and Pacific Railroad through the territory. De Soto is the name of a railroad official.

== Geography ==
According to the United States Census Bureau, the city has a total area of 1.52 square miles (3.94 km^{2}), all land.

== Demographics ==
Historical populations
Year	Pop.	±%
1880	347	—
1890	328	−5.5%
1900	345	+5.2%
1910	356	+3.2%
1920	261	−26.7%
1930	319	+22.2%
1940	274	−14.1%
1950	280	+2.2%
1960	273	−2.5%
1970	369	+35.2%
1980	1,035	+180.5%
1990	1,033	−0.2%
2000	1,009	−2.3%
2010	1,050	+4.1%
2020	915	−12.9%
Source:"U.S. Census website". United States Census Bureau. and Iowa Data Center; Source: U.S. Decennial Census

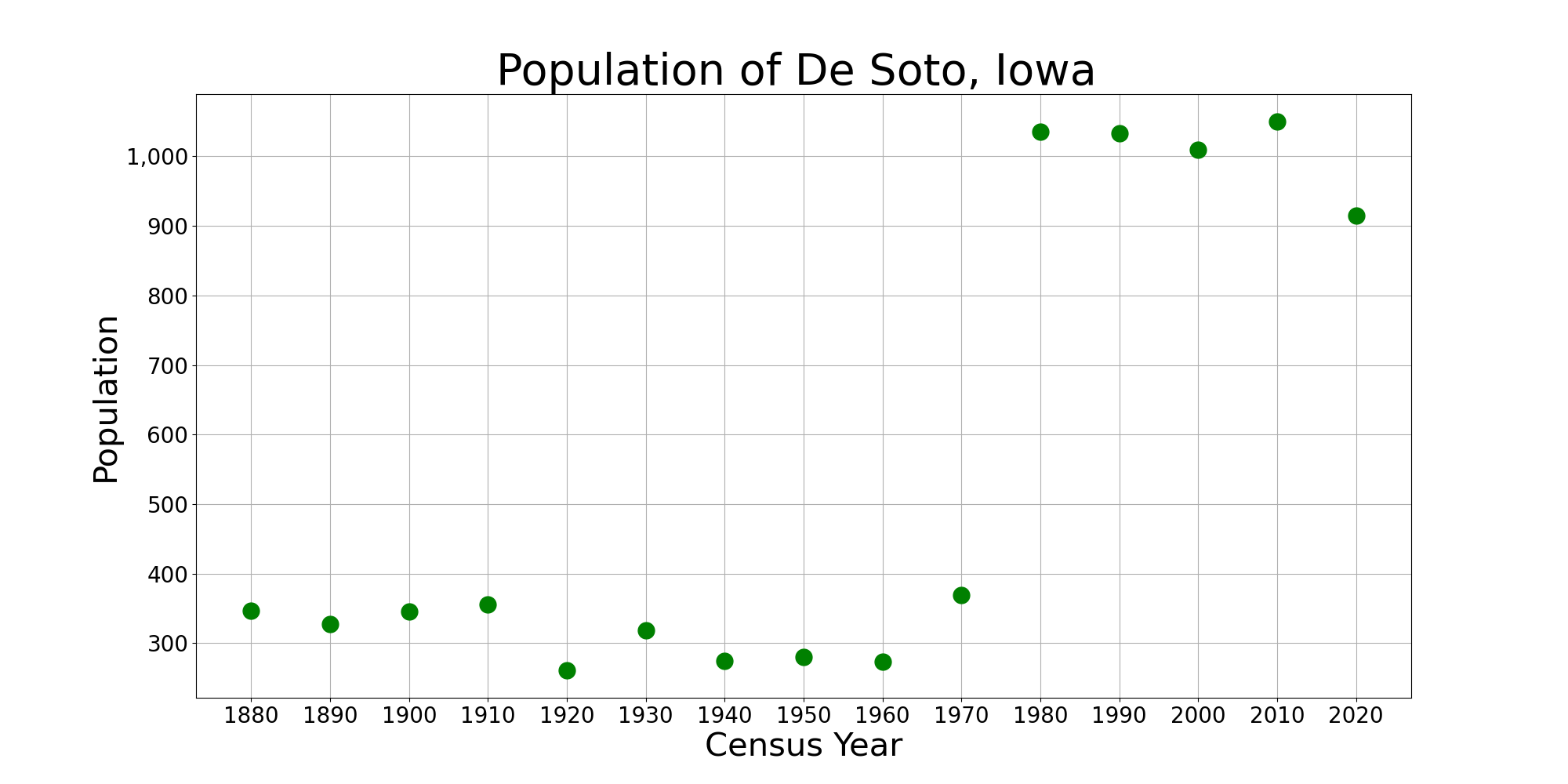
The population of De Soto, Iowa from US census data

=== 2020 census ===
As of the census of 2020, there were 915 people, 354 households, and 255 families residing in the city. The population density was 523.9 inhabitants per square mile (202.3/km^{2}). There were 379 housing units at an average density of 217.0 per square mile (83.8/km^{2}). The racial makeup of the city was 91.4% White, 0.7% Black or African American, 0.4% Native American, 1.6% Asian, 0.2% Pacific Islander, 0.8% from other races and 4.9% from two or more races. Hispanic or Latino persons of any race comprised 1.7% of the population.

Of the 354 households, 38.7% of which had children under the age of 18 living with them, 52.5% were married couples living together, 8.8% were cohabitating couples, 19.2% had a female householder with no spouse or partner present and 19.5% had a male householder with no spouse or partner present. 28.0% of all households were non-families. 22.6% of all households were made up of individuals, 8.8% had someone living alone who was 65 years old or older.

The median age in the city was 36.1 years. 28.7% of the residents were under the age of 20; 4.0% were between the ages of 20 and 24; 29.9% were from 25 and 44; 23.9% were from 45 and 64; and 13.3% were 65 years of age or older. The gender makeup of the city was 50.1% male and 49.9% female.

=== 2010 census ===
As of the census of 2010, there were 1,050 people, 388 households, and 291 families living in the city. The population density was 690.8 inhabitants per square mile (266.7/km^{2}). There were 417 housing units at an average density of 274.3 per square mile (105.9/km^{2}). The racial makeup of the city was 96.6% White, 0.7% African American, 0.5% Native American, 0.2% Asian, 0.8% from other races, and 1.3% from two or more races. Hispanic or Latino of any race were 1.8% of the population.

There were 388 households, of which 40.2% had children under the age of 18 living with them, 61.3% were married couples living together, 8.0% had a female householder with no husband present, 5.7% had a male householder with no wife present, and 25.0% were non-families. 18.8% of all households were made up of individuals, and 6% had someone living alone who was 65 years of age or older. The average household size was 2.71 and the average family size was 3.10.

The median age in the city was 34.6 years. 28.9% of residents were under the age of 18; 6.2% were between the ages of 18 and 24; 30.2% were from 25 to 44; 24.9% were from 45 to 64; and 9.6% were 65 years of age or older. The gender makeup of the city was 51.0% male and 49.0% female.

=== 2000 census ===
As of the census of 2000, there were 1,009 people, 374 households, and 283 families living in the city. The population density was 681.4 inhabitants per square mile (263.1/km^{2}). There were 401 housing units at an average density of 270.8 per square mile (104.6/km^{2}). The racial makeup of the city was 99.21% White, 0.10% Native American, 0.20% Asian, 0.10% from other races, and 0.40% from two or more races. Hispanic or Latino of any race were 0.69% of the population.

There were 374 households, out of which 40.6% had children under the age of 18 living with them, 65.5% were married couples living together, 8.3% had a female householder with no husband present, and 24.1% were non-families. 17.4% of all households were made up of individuals, and 4.5% had someone living alone who was 65 years of age or older. The average household size was 2.70 and the average family size was 3.09.

In the city, the population was spread out, with 28.8% under the age of 18, 8.0% from 18 to 24, 32.1% from 25 to 44, 24.1% from 45 to 64, and 6.9% who were 65 years of age or older. The median age was 34 years. For every 100 females, there were 103.0 males. For every 100 females age 18 and over, there were 100.0 males.

The median income for a household in the city was $48,816, and the median income for a family was $51,397. Males had a median income of $31,250 versus $23,784 for females. The per capita income for the city was $17,464. About 3.7% of families and 3.3% of the population were below the poverty line, including 3.0% of those under age 18 and 3.2% of those age 65 or over.

== Education ==
De Soto is within the Adel–De Soto–Minburn Community School District. The district formed on July 1, 1993, as a result of the merger of the Adel–De Soto Community School District and the Central Dallas Community School District.
