= List of aircraft manufacturers (B–C) =

This is a list of aircraft manufacturers sorted alphabetically by International Civil Aviation Organization (ICAO)/common name. It contains the ICAO/common name, manufacturers name(s), country and other data, with the known years of operation in parentheses.

The ICAO names are listed in bold. Having an ICAO name does not mean that a manufacturer is still in operation today. Just that some of the aircraft produced by that manufacturer are still flying.

== B ==
- B/E Aerospace – United States, UK, UAE, www.beaerospace.com
- B&B Manufacturing Company – Valencia, Ca, www.bbmfg.com
- B&W, Boeing & Westervelt – United States, (1916) > Pacific Aero
- Babcock Aircraft Company
- British Aircraft Corporation (**BAC**) Ltd – United Kingdom, (1959–1977) > British Aerospace
- Bach Aircraft – United States
- Bachem, Bachem – Germany, (1944–1945)
- Back Bone, Tallard, France
- Backcountry Super Cubs, Douglas, Wyoming, United States
- **BAE Systems**, BAE Systems PLC – United Kingdom, (1999–present)
- **BAE Systems Australia**, BAE Systems Australia Ltd – Australia
- BAI, Bureau of Aircraft Industry – Republic of China, (1946–1969) > Air Technical Bureau
- **Bakeng**, Bakeng Aircraft – United States
- **Bakeng**, Gerald Bakeng – United States
- Ball-Bartoe – United States
- Barkley-Grow, Barkley Grow Aircraft Corporation – United States
- **Barnett**, Barnett Rotorcraft – United States
- **Barr**, Barr Aircraft – United States
- Barrows, Bob Barrows – United States
- Bartel – Poland
- Bartlett Aircraft – United States
- **Basler**, Basler Turbo Conversions Inc – United States
- BAT, British Aerial Transport Co. Ltd. – United Kingdom
- Bay Aviation, Bay – United States
- Bayerische Flugzeugwerke, Bayerische Flugzeugwerke – Germany, (1926–1938) (BFW – Bavarian Aircraft Works) > Messerschmitt
- BDC Aero Industrie, Lachute, Quebec, Canada
- **Bd-Micro**, BD-Micro Technologies Inc – United States
- **Beagle**, Beagle Aircraft (1969) Ltd – United Kingdom, (?-1970) > Scottish Aviation
- **Beagle**, Beagle Aircraft Ltd – United Kingdom
- **Beagle-Auster**, Beagle-Auster Ltd – United Kingdom
- Beardmore, William Beardmore & Co – United Kingdom
- Beaujon Aircraft – United States
- **Bede**, BD Micro Technologies Inc – United States
- **Bede**, Bede Aircraft Corporation – United States
- **Bede**, Bede Aircraft Inc – United States
- **Bede**, Bede Aviation Corporation – United States
- **Bede**, Bede Jet Corporation – United States
- **Bede**, BEDEAmerica Aerosport LLC – United States
- **Beech**, Beech Aircraft Corporation – United States, (1932–1980) > Raytheon > Hawker Beechcraft
- **Beech-Sferma**, see BEECH and SFERMA – United States/France
- Beecraft, Bee Aviation Associates, Inc. – United States, (1948–1960)
- **Beets**, Glenn Beets – United States
- **Beijing Keyuan**, Beijing Keyuan Light Aircraft Industrial Company Ltd – China
- Belairbus, Belairbus – Belgium, (1979–present)
- **Bel-Aire**, Bel-Aire Aviation – United States
- **Bell**, Bell Aircraft Corporation – United States, (1935–1960)
- **Bell**, Bell Helicopter Company, Division of Bell Aerospace Corporation – United States, (1960–present)
- **Bell**, Bell Helicopter Textron Inc – United States
- **Bell**, Bell Helicopter Textron, Division of Textron Canada Ltd – Canada
- **Bell**, Bell Helicopter Textron, Division of Textron Inc – United States
- **Bell-Agusta**, Bell-Agusta Aerospace Company – United States/Italy
- **Bellanca**, Bellanca Aircraft Corporation – United States, (1927–1983) > AviaBellanca
- **Bellanca**, Bellanca Aircraft Engineering – United States
- **Bellanca**, Bellanca Inc – United States
- **Bellanca**, Bellanca Sales Manufacturing Inc – United States
- **Bell-Boeing**, see BELL and BOEING – United States
- Beneš & Hajn, Beneš & Hajn – Unknown, (1923) > Avia
- Beneš-Mráz – Czechoslovakia
- **Bengis**, Bengis Aircraft Company (Pty) Ltd – South Africa
- Bensen, Bensen Aircraft Corporation – United States, (?-1987)
- Bereznyak-Isayev, Alexander Yakovlevich Bereznyak and Alexei Mikhailovich Isayev – Soviet Union
- Berger, Hans Berger – Switzerland
- **Beriev**, Beriev OKB – Russia, (1934–present) (Beriev Aircraft Company)
- **Beriev**, Berieva Aviatsionnyi Kompaniya – Russia
- **Beriev**, Taganrogsky Aviatsionnyi Nauchno-Tekhnicheskiy Kompleks Imeni G. M. Berieva – Russia
- **Berkut**, Berkut Engineering Inc – United States
- Berliner, Berliner Aircraft Co. – United States, (1926–1929) > Berliner-Joyce
- Berliner-Joyce, Berliner-Joyce Aircraft Corp. – United States, (1929–?)
- Bernard, Société des Avions Bernard – France
- Berwick, FW Berwick and Company Ltd. – United Kingdom
- Besson, Besson – France, (1915–1928) > ANF Mureaux
- **Best Off**, Best Off – France, (?-present)
- **Bharat**, Bharat Heavy Electricals Ltd – India
- **Billie**, Billie Aero Marine – France
- Bilsam Aviation, Poznań, Poland
- **Binder**, Binder Aviatik KG – Germany
- Birdman, Birdman Aircraft, US
- Birdman, Birdman Enterprises, Canada
- Bisnovat, Bisnovat – Russia
- **Bitz**, Bitz Flugzeugbau GmbH – Germany
- **Bitz**, Fa. Josef Bitz – Germany
- **Blackburn**, Blackburn Aircraft Ltd – United Kingdom, (1914–1949) > General Aircraft Ltd
- Blackshape srl, Monopoli, Italy
- Blackwing Sweden, Lund, Sweden
- **Blériot**, Société Blériot Aéronautique – France, (1906–1914) > Blériot-SPAD
- Blériot-SPAD, Blériot-SPAD – France, (1914–1936) > Sud-Ouest
- Blériot-Voisin, Blériot-Voisin – France, (1903–1906) > Blériot, Voisin
- Bloch, Societé des Avions Marcel Bloch – France, (1930–1936) (1945) > Sud-Ouest, Dassault
- Blohm & Voss, Blohm Und Voss – Germany, (1930–1969) > Messerschmitt-Bölkow-Blohm
- **Blue Yonder**, Blue Yonder Aviation Inc – Canada
- Blume, Walter Blume – Germany
- **B-N Group**, B-N Group Ltd – United Kingdom, (1964–present) (Britten-Norman)
- **Boeing**, Boeing Aircraft Company – United States, (1916–present)
- **Boeing**, The Boeing Airplane Company – United States
- **Boeing**, The Boeing Company – United States
- **Boeing Canada**, Boeing Aircraft of Canada Ltd – Canada
- Boeing North American, Boeing North American, Inc. – United States, (1996–present)
- **Boeing Vertol**, Boeing Vertol Company – United States
- **Boeing-Sikorsky**, see BOEING and SIKORSKY – United States
- **Boeve**, Boeve Fiberglass Components Inc – United States
- Bohemia, Bohemia – Czech Republic
- **Boisavia**, Société Boisavia – France
- **Bolkow**, Bölkow-Apparatebau GmbH – Germany, (1948–1968) > Messerschmitt-Bölkow
- **Bolkow**, Bölkow-Entwicklungen GmbH – Germany
- Booth Aerospace North America – United States
- **Bombardier**, Bombardier Inc – Canada, (1986–present)
- Borel, Etablissements Borel, France > SGCIM
- Boulton & Paul Ltd United Kingdom, (1914–1934)
- Boulton Paul Aircraft Ltd – United Kingdom, (1934–1961)
- **Bowers**, Peter M. Bowers – United States
- **Bradley**, Bradley Aerospace – United States
- Brandenburg, Brandenburg – Germany
- **Brandli**, Max Brändli – Switzerland
- **Brantly**, Brantly Helicopter Corporation – United States
- **Brantly**, Brantly Helicopter Industries USA Company Ltd – United States
- **Brantly**, Brantly International Inc (Helicopter Division) – United States
- **Brantly-Hynes**, Brantly-Hynes Helicopter Inc – United States, (1975–?)
- Bratukhin, Bratukhin – Russia, (1940–1951)
- **Brditschka**, H. W. Brditschka OHG – Austria
- **Brditschka**, HB-Brditschka GmbH & Co KG – Austria
- Breda, Societa Italiana Ernesto Breda – Italy
- **Bredanardi**, BredaNardi Costruzione Aeronautiche SpA – Italy
- **Breguet**, Société des Ateliers d'Aviation Louis Bréguet – France, (1911–1969) > Dassault-Breguet
- Brewster, Brewster Aeronautical Corporation – United States, (1932–1946)
- **Brian Allen**, Brian Allen Aviation – United Kingdom
- Briegleb, Gus Briegleb – US
- **Bristol**, Bristol Aircraft Ltd – United Kingdom, (1910–1959) > British Aircraft Corporation
- **Bristol**, The Bristol Aeroplane Company Ltd – United Kingdom
- Bristol Helicopter, Bristol Helicopter Ltd. – United Kingdom, (1944–1969) > Westland Aircraft
- **British Aerospace**, British Aerospace – United Kingdom, (1977–1999) (BAe) > BAE Systems
- **British Aerospace**, British Aerospace PLC – United Kingdom
- British Aircraft Company, British Aircraft Company – United Kingdom
- British Aircraft Manufacturing, British Aircraft Mfg. Co. – United Kingdom, (BAMC)
- British Klemm, British Aircraft Klemm Aeroplane Co Ltd. – United Kingdom, > British Aircraft Mfg. Co.
- **Britten-Norman**, Britten-Norman (Bembridge) Ltd – United Kingdom
- **Britten-Norman**, Britten-Norman Ltd – United Kingdom, (1964–present)
- **BRM Costruções Aeronáuticas**, Pero Pinheiro, Portugal
- Brochet, Constructions Aéronautiques Maurice Brochet – France
- **Ken Brock Manufacturing**, Stanton, California, United States
- Brokaw, Bergon Brokaw – US
- **Brooklands**, Brooklands Aerospace Ltd – United Kingdom
- **Brooklands**, Brooklands Aircraft Ltd – United Kingdom
- Brügger, Max Brügger – Switzerland
- Brush Electrical, Brush Electrical Engineering Co. Ltd. – United Kingdom, (Originally Anglo-American Brush Electric Light Corporation)
- Brutsche Aircraft Corporation, Salt Lake City, Utah, United States
- **Buchanan**, Buchanan Aircraft Corporation Ltd – Australia
- **Bucker**, Bücker Flugzeugbau GmbH – Germany, (1932–1945)
- **Bucker Prado**, Bücker Prado SL – Spain
- **București**, Intreprinderea de Avioane București – Romania
- Budd Manufacturing, Edward G. Budd Manufacturing Company – United States
- **Buethe**, Buethe Enterprises Inc – United States
- **Buhl**, Buhl Aircraft Company – United States
- **Bul**, Bourgogne Ultra Léger Aviation – France
- Burgess, Burgess Company – United States, (1911–1916) (Originally Burgess Company and Curtis, Inc.)
- Büttner Propeller, Gerald Büttner – Obernkirchen, Obernkirchen, Germany
- Burl's Aircraft, Chugiak, Alaska – United States, (1982–Present)
- Burnelli, Burnelli Aircraft Co. – United States
- **Bushby**, Bushby Aircraft Inc – United States
- **Bushby**, Bushby Aircraft Inc – United States
- Bye Aerospace, Englewood, Colorado, United States

== C ==
- C. Itoh, C. Itoh & Co – Japan, (1955–1970) > JAMCO
- **CAARP**, Cooperatives des Ateliers Aéronautiques de la Région Parisienne – France
- **CAB**, Constructions Aéronautiques du Béarn – France
- **Cable-Price**, Cable-Price Corporation – New Zealand
- **Cabrinha**, Cabrinha Aircraft Corporation – United States
- **Cabrinha**, Cabrinha Engineering Inc – United States
- **CAG**, Construcciones Aeronáuticas de Galicia – Spain
- Caldas Aeronautica, Pali, Colombia
- Calipt'Air, Spiez, Switzerland
- **Callair**, Call Aircraft Company – United States, (1939–1959) > IMCO
- **Callair**, Callair Inc – United States
- **Calumet**, Calumet Motorsports Inc – United States
- **Camair**, Camair Aircraft Corporation – United States
- **Camair**, Camair Division of Cameron Iron Works Inc – United States
- CAMCO, Central Aircraft Manufacturing Company – China, CAMCO
- **Cameron**, Cameron & Sons Aircraft – United States
- **Campana**, Campana Aviation – France
- CAMS, Chantiers Aéro-Maritimes de la Seine – France
- CAMS, Cairns Development Company – United States, (or Cairns Aircraft (E. B. Cams))
- Calumet Motorsports, Lansing, Illinois, United States
- **Canada Air RV**, Canada Air RV Inc – Canada
- **Canadair**, Bombardier Aerospace Canadair – Canada, (?-1986) > Bombardier Aerospace
- **Canadair**, Canadair Group of Bombardier Inc – Canada
- **Canadair**, Canadair Inc – Canada
- **Canadair**, Canadair Ltd – Canada
- Canadian Aeroplanes, Canadian Aeroplanes Ltd. – Canada
- Canadian Car & Foundry, Canadian Car & Foundry Co. – Canada
- **Canadian Home Rotors**, Canadian Home Rotors Inc – Canada
- **Canadian Vickers**, Canadian Vickers Ltd – Canada
- Canard Aviation – Switzerland
- CANSA, Cansa – Italy
- CANT, Cantiere Navale Triestino – Italy, (?-1931) > CRDA
- CAO/SNCAO, Societe Nationale de Construction Aeronautique de l'Ouest – France
- CAP – Companhia Aéronautica Paulista – Brazil
- **CAP Aviation**, CAP Aviation – France
- **Capella**, Capella Aircraft Corporation, Austin, Texas, United States
- Caproni, Caproni – Italy, (1908–1983) > Agusta
- **Caproni Vizzola**, Caproni Vizzola Costruzione Aeronautiche SpA – Italy
- **Carlson**, Carlson Aircraft Inc – United States
- CARMAM, Coopérative d'Approvisionnement et de Réparation de Matériel Aéronautique de Moulins – France
- Carplane GmbH, Braunschweig, Germany
- **Carriou**, Louis Carriou – France
- Carstedt, Carstedt – United Kingdom
- **Cartercopters**, CarterCopters LLC – United States
- **CASA**, Construcciones Aeronáuticas SA – Spain
- Caspar, Caspar-Werke – Germany
- **Cassutt**, Thomas K. Cassutt – United States
- **CATA**, Construction Aéronautique de Technologie Avancée – France
- Caudron, British Caudron Co Ltd. – United Kingdom, (Last aircraft made in 1919, went into receivership 1924.)
- **Caudron**, Caudron – France, (1909–?)
- Cavalier, Cavalier Aircraft Corp. – United States, (?-1971) > Piper Aircraft
- **CCF**, Canadian Car & Foundry Company Ltd – Canada
- **CEI**, CEI – United States
- **Celier Aviation**, CA – Poland
- **Celair**, Celair (Pty) Ltd – South Africa
- Centrair, SA Centrair – France
- Central Aircraft Company, Central Aircraft Company Limited – United Kingdom
- Centrala Flygverkstaden Malmslätt (CFM) – Sweden
- Centrala Verkstaden Malmslätt (CVM) – Sweden
- **Centre Est**, Centre Est Aéronautique – France
- **Century**, Century Aircraft Corporation – United States
- **CERVA**, Consortium Européen de Réalisation et de Vente d'Avions GIE – France
- **Cessna**, Cessna Aircraft Company – United States, (1927–present)
- Cessna-Roos, Cessna-Roos Aircraft Company – United States, (1927) > Cessna Aircraft
- Clyde Cessna, Clyde Cessna – United States, (1911) (Clyde Vernon Cessna) > Travel Air
- Cessna-Reims, Cessna-Reims – United States/France
- CFA, Compagnie Française d'Aviation – France
- **CFM**, CFM Aircraft Ltd – United Kingdom
- **CFM**, Cook Flying Machines, CFM Metal Fax Ltd – United Kingdom
- CFM Air, Ciriè, Italy
- **CGS Aviation**, Grand Bay, Alabama, United States
- Chadwick, Chadwick Helicopters – United States
- **Chalard**, Jacques et Renée Chalard – France
- **Champion**, Champion Aircraft Company Inc – United States, (1954–1970) > Bellanca
- **Champion**, Champion Aircraft Corporation – United States
- **Chance Vought**, Chance Vought Aircraft Inc – United States, (1922–1961) > Vought
- **Chance Vought**, Chance Vought Corporation – United States
- **Changhe**, Changhe Aircraft Factory – China
- **Changhe**, Changhe Aircraft Industries Corporation – China
- **Changhe**, Changhe Aircraft Manufacturing Corporation – China
- **Chasle**, Yves Chasle – France
- **Chayair**, Chayair Manufacturing and Aviation – South Africa
- **Chengdu**, Chengdu Aircraft Industrial Corporation – China
- **Chernov**, Opytnyi Konstruktorskoye Byuro Chernov B & M OOO – Russia
- Chetverikov, Chetverikov – Russia, (Igor Vyacheslavovich Chetverikov)
- **Chichester-Miles**, Chichester-Miles Consultants Ltd – United Kingdom
- **Chilton**, Chilton Aircraft – United Kingdom, (1937–?)
- **Chincul**, Chincul SACAIFI – Argentina
- **Chris Tena**, Chris Tena Aircraft Association – United States
- Chrislea, Chrislea Aircraft Co. Ltd. – United Kingdom
- **Christen**, Christen Industries Inc – United States
- Chu, Major General C.J. Chu – Republic of China
- Cicaré, Cicaré Helicópteros SA – Argentina
- Cierva, Cierva Autogyro Company – United Kingdom, (Juan de la Cierva)
- **Circa**, Circa Reproductions – Canada
- **Cirrus**, Cirrus Design Corporation – United States, (1984–present)
- Citroen-Marchetti, Citroen-Marchetti – France
- Civil Aviation Department of India – India
- **Claassen**, Claassen – United States
- **CLASS**, Canadian Light Aircraft Sales and Services Inc – Canada
- **Classic**, Classic Aircraft Corporation (WACO Classic Aircraft Corporation) – United States
- **Classic Fighter**, Classic Fighter Industries Inc – United States
- **Classic Sport**, Classic Sport Aircraft – United States
- **Claudius Dornier**, Claudius Dornier Seastar GmbH & Co KG – Germany
- Claxton High School – United States
- Clément-Bayard – France
- **Clifford Aeroworks**, Clifford Aeroworks – United States
- Cligent Aerospace – India
- Clutton, Eric Clutton – United Kingdom
- CMASA, Costruzioni Meccaniche Aeronautiche Società Anonima – Italy
- CNA, Compagnia Nazionale Aeronautica – Italy
- **CNIAR**, Centrul National al Industriei Aeronautice Române – Romania
- CNNA, Companhia Nacional de Navegação Aérea – Brazil
- Coandă, Henri Coandă – Romania, (1910–1911) (Henri Marie Coandă) > Bristol
- **COBELAVIA**, Compagnie Belge d'Aviation – Belgium
- **Cobra**, Cobra Aviation – Australia
- Cody, Samuel Cody – United Kingdom, (Samuel Franklin Cody)
- **Colemill**, Colemill Enterprises Inc – United States
- **Collins**, Collins Aero – United States
- **Colomban**, Michel Colomban – France
- Colombia, Columbia Aircraft Company – United States
- **Colonial**, Colonial Aircraft Corporation – United States
- COMAC, Commercial Aircraft Corporation of China – China (2008–present)
- **Commander**, Commander Aircraft Company – United States
- **Commonwealth (1)**, Commonwealth Aircraft Corporation Pty Ltd – Australia (CAC)
- **Commonwealth (2)**, Commonwealth Aircraft Corporation Inc – United States, (1942–1947)
- Comper, Comper Aircraft Co. Ltd. – United Kingdom, (1929–?)
- Comte, Comte Aircraft Factory – Switzerland
- **Conair**, Conair Group Inc. – Canada
- Condor Powered Parachutes, Nicholson, Georgia, United States, (later called Southern Powered Parachutes)
- **Conroy**, Conroy Aircraft Corporation – United States
- **Consolidated Aeronautics Corporation** – manufactured Lake aircraft in the 1960s–70s – United States
- **Consolidated**, Consolidated Aircraft Corporation – United States
- **Continental Copters**, Continental Copters Inc – United States
- **Convair**, Consolidated-Vultee Aircraft Corporation – United States, (1943–1996) > General Dynamics
- **Convair**, Convair Division of General Dynamics Corporation – United States
- Corben Sport Plane and Supply Company (US) – founded 1931, sold to Paul Poberezny in 1952
- **Corby**, John C. Corby – Australia
- **Cosy**, Cosy Europe – Germany
- **Country Air**, Country Air Inc – United States
- **Coupe**, Coupé-Aviation – France
- Cox-Klemin, Cox-Klemin Aircraft Corporation – United States
- **Co-Z**, Co-Z Development Corporation – United States
- **Co-Z**, Co-Z Europa – Germany
- **Crae**, CRAE Elettromeccanica SpA – Italy
- **Craiova**, Intreprinderea de Avioane Craiova – Romania
- **Cranfield**, Cranfield Institute of Technology, College of Aeronautics – United Kingdom
- CRDA, Cantiere Riuniti dell'Adriatico – Italy (1931–?)
- **Creative Flight**, Creative Flight Inc – Canada
- **Croses**, Emilien Croses – France
- **CSS**, Centralne Studium Samolotów – Poland
- **CTRM**, Composites Technology Research Malaysia Sdn Bhd – Malaysia
- **Cub**, Cub Aircraft Company – Canada
- **Cub Crafters**, Cub Crafters Inc – United States
- **Culp**, Culps Specialties – United States
- **Culver**, Culver Aircraft Company – United States
- Cunliffe-Owen, Cunliffe-Owen Aircraft – United Kingdom
- **Curtiss**, Curtiss-Wright Corporation – United States, (1929–present)
- Curtiss Aeroplane and Motor Company, Curtiss Aeroplane and Motor Company – United States, (1909–1929) > Curtiss-Wright
- Curtiss-Reid Aircraft Ltd., Curtiss-Reid Aircraft Ltd. – Canada
- Custer Channel Wing Corporation, Hagerstown, Maryland – United States
- **Custom Flight**, Custom Flight Components Ltd – Canada
- **Custom Flight Limited**, Tiny, Ontario, Canada
- **Cvjetkovic**, Anton Cvjetkovic – United States
- C.W. Aircraft Ltd – United Kingdom > General Aircraft Ltd
- CWL, Centralne Warsztaty Lotnicze – Poland
- **CZAW**, Czech Aircraft Works SRO – Czech Republic
- Cyclone Manufacturing Inc., Mississauga, Ontario, Canada (Aerospace Parts Manufacturing)
- CZL, Centralne Zaklady Lotnicze – Poland, (Central Aviation Establishment)
- Cirrus aircraft co.

== See also ==
- Aircraft
- List of aircraft engine manufacturers
- List of aircraft manufacturers

== Bibliography ==
- Green, William (1986) [1970]. The Warplanes of the Third Reich. New York: Galahad Books. ISBN 0-88365-666-3.
