= List of aircraft manufacturers (H–L) =

This is a list of aircraft manufacturers sorted alphabetically by International Civil Aviation Organization (ICAO)/common name. It contains the ICAO/common name, manufacturers names, country and other data, with the known years of operation in parentheses.

The ICAO names are listed in bold. Having an ICAO name does not mean that a manufacturer is still in operation today. Just that some of the aircraft produced by that manufacturer are still flying.

== H ==
- **Hagglund**, Hägglund & Söner – Sweden
- **HAI**, Hellenic Aerospace Industry – Greece
- **Hainz**, Franz Hainz – Germany
- **Halberstadt**, Halberstädter Flugzeug-Werke GmbH – Germany
- Hall, Cunningham-Hall Aircraft Corporation – United States
- **Halsted**, Barry Halsted – United States
- **Hamburger Flugzeugbau**, Hamburger Flugzeugbau GmbH – Germany, (1932-1940) > Blohm & Voss
- **Hamilton**, Hamilton Aircraft Company Inc – United States
- **Hamilton**, Hamilton Aviation – United States
- H&E Paramotores, Madrid, Spain
- **Handley Page**, Handley Page (Reading) Ltd – United Kingdom
- **Handley Page**, Handley Page Ltd – United Kingdom, (?-1970) > Scottish Aviation
- Hannaford, Hannaford Aircraft – United States
- Hannover, Hannoversche Waggonfabrik AG – Germany
- Hanriot, Aeroplanes Hanriot et Cie – France, (1914–1936) > SNCAC
- Hansa-Brandenburg, Hansa-Brandenburg – Germany, > Heinkel
- Hanseatische Flugzeugwerke, Hanseatische Flugzeugwerke – Germany, (Hansa)
- **HAPI**, HAPI Engines Inc – United States
- **Harbin**, Harbin Aircraft Manufacturing Corporation – China, (1952–?) (HAMC)
- **Harbin EMBRAER**, Harbin Embraer Aircraft Industry Company Ltd – China
- Harlow, Harlow Aircraft Co. – United States
- **Harmening's High Flyers**, Genoa, Illinois and later in Big Stone City, South Dakota, United States
- **Harmon (1)**, James B. Harmon – United States
- **Harmon (2)**, D & J Harmon Co Inc – United States
- **Harmon (2)**, Harmon Rocket LLC – United States
- Harper Aircraft Manufacturing Company, Harper Aircraft Manufacturing Company Inc. – United States
- Harris & Sheldon, Harris & Sheldon Ltd – United Kingdom
- **HAT**, Hellenic Aeronautical Technologies – Greece
- **Hatz**, John D. Hatz – United States
- **HAVELSAN**, Hava Elektronik Sanayi (Air Electronic Industries) – Turkey
- **Hawker**, Hawker Aircraft Ltd – United Kingdom, (1920–1961) > Hawker Siddeley
- **Hawker De Havilland**, Hawker De Havilland Australia Pty Ltd – Australia
- **Hawker De Havilland**, Hawker De Havilland Ltd – Australia
- Hawker Pacific Aerospace, Hawker Pacific Aerospace – United Kingdom, (1980–present)
- **Hawker Siddeley**, Hawker Siddeley Aviation Ltd – United Kingdom
- Hawksley, A W Hawksley Ltd. – United Kingdom
- **HB-Aircraft**, HB-Aircraft Industries Luftfahrzeug AG – Austria
- **HB-Flugtechnik**, HB-Flugtechnik GmbH – Austria
- HBN, HBN Group – United Kingdom/France, (Hawker, Breguet and Nord-Aviation)
- **Heinkel**, Ernst Heinkel AG – Germany, (?-1959) > FUS
- **Heintz**, Christophe Heintz – France
- **Helibras**, Helicópteros do Brasil SA – Brazil
- Helikopter Services, Helikopter Services – Unknown
- **Helio**, Helio Aircraft Company – United States
- **Helio**, Helio Aircraft Corporation – United States
- **Helio**, Helio Aircraft Ltd – United States
- **Heliopolis**, Heliopolis Air Works – Egypt
- **Helipro**, Helipro Corporation International – United States
- **Heli-Sport**, CH-7 Heli-Sport Srl., Torino, Italy
- **Helwan**, Helwan Air Works – Egypt
- **Henderson**, Henderson Aero Specialties Inc – United States
- Henschel, Henschel & Son – Germany
- Hermeus, Hermeus Corporation – United States
- HESA, IRan Aircraft Industries – Iran
- Heston Aircraft, Heston Aircraft Co. Ltd. – United Kingdom
- **HFB**, Hamburger Flugzeugbau GmbH – Germany, (postwar) > Messerschmitt-Bölkow-Blohm (MBB)
- **Highlander**, Highlander Aircraft Corporation – United States
- **Hillberg Helicopters**, Fountain Valley, California, United States
- **Hiller**, Hiller Aircraft Company Inc – United States
- **Hiller**, Hiller Aircraft Corporation – United States
- **Hiller**, Hiller Aviation Inc – United States
- **Hiller**, Hiller Helicopters – United States
- **Hiller**, Hiller Helicopters Inc – United States
- **Hindustan Aeronautics Limited**, Bangalore, India
- **Hindustan**, Hindustan Aircraft Ltd – India
- Hiro Naval Arsenal, Hiro Naval Arsenal – Japan
- **Hirth**, Wolf Hirth GmbH – Germany
- **Hispano**, La Hispano Aviación S.A. – Spain, (?-1972) > CASA
- Hispano-Suiza, Hispano-Suiza – Spain, France
- **Historical Aircraft**, Historical Aircraft Corporation – United States
- **HK**, HK Aircraft Technology AG – Germany
- **HOAC**, HOAC Austria Flugzeugwerk Wiener Neustadt GmbH – Austria
- **Hoffmann**, Hoffmann Aircraft Flugzeugproduktion und Entwicklung GmbH – Austria
- **Hoffmann**, Hoffmann Flugzeugbau-Friesach GmbH – Austria
- **Hoffmann**, Wolf Hoffmann Flugzeugbau KG – Germany
- **Holcomb**, Jerry Holcomb – United States
- **Hollmann**, Martin Hollmann – United States
- **Honda Aircraft Company**, subsidiary of Honda Motor Company Ltd – Japan
- **Honda-Mississippi**, Honda & Mississippi State University – Japan/United States
- **Hongdu**, Hongdu Aviation Industry Group – China
- **Hovey**, Robert W. Hovey – United States
- **Howard (1)**, Howard Aircraft Corporation – United States
- **Howard (2)**, Howard Aero Inc – United States
- **Howard (2)**, Howard Aero Manufacturing Division of Business Aircraft Corporation – United States
- **Howard Hughes Engineering**, Howard Hughes Engineering Pty Ltd – Australia
- **HPA**, High Performance Aircraft GmbH & Co KG – Germany
- Huff-Daland, Huff-Daland – United States, (1920–1933) (Ogdensburg Aeroway Corp.) > Huff-Daland Aero Corporation > Huff-Daland Aero Company > Keystone Aircraft Corporation
- **Hughes**, Hughes Helicopters Division of Summa Corporation – United States
- **Hughes**, Hughes Helicopters Inc – United States
- **Hughes**, Hughes Tool Company, Aircraft Division – United States
- **Humbert Aviation**, Ramonchamp, France
- **Hummel Aviation**, J. Morry Hummel, Bryan, Ohio, United States
- **Hunting**, Hunting Aircraft Ltd – United Kingdom, (1957–1959) > British Aircraft Corporation
- **Hunting Percival**, Hunting Percival Aircraft Ltd – United Kingdom
- **Hurel-Dubois**, Société de Construction des Avions Hurel-Dubois – France
- Hybrid Aircraft Corporation – United States
- **Hydroplane**, Gidroplan ooo – Russia
- **Hydroplane**, Hydroplane Ltd – Russia
- **Hynes**, Hynes Helicopter Inc – United States
- **Hyundai**, Hyundai Precision Industry – South Korea, > Korea Aerospace Industries

== I ==
- **IAI**, Israel Aerospace Industries Ltd – Israel
- **Iannotta**, Dott. Ing. Orlando Iannotta – Italy
- **IAR**, IAR (Industria Aeronautică Română) SA – Romania
- Iberavia, Spain
- **IBIS**, Ibis Aerospace Ltd – Czech Republic/Taiwan
- **Ibis Aircraft**, Ibis Aircraft S.A., Cali, Colombia
- **ICA**, Intreprinderea de Constructii Aeronautice – Romania
- **ID Integration**, ID Integration, Inc. – United States
- **Ikar**, OOO Aviaklub Ikar – Ukraine
- Ikarus, Ikarus Tvornica Aero i Hydroplana – Serbia and Montenegro
- **Ilyushin**, Aviatsionnyi Kompleks Imeni S. V. Ilyushina OAO – Russia
- **Ilyushin**, Ilyushin OKB – Russia
- Ilyushin – see Aviation Association Ilyushin
- IMAM, Industrie Meccaniche e Aeronautiche Meridionali – Italy
- **IMCO**, Intermountain Manufacturing Company – United States, (1962–1966) > Rockwell
- **IMP**, IMP Group Ltd – Canada
- **Impulse**, Impulse Aircraft GmbH – Germany
- **Indaer Chile**, Industria Aeronáutica de Chile – Chile
- **Indaer Peru**, Industria Aeronautica del Peru SA – Peru
- Independence Paragliding, (A brand of Fly-market Flugsport-Zubehör GmbH & Co. KG) Eisenberg, Germany
- **IAe**, Bandung – Indonesia
- **Indus**, IndUS Aviation Inc – United States
- **Indy Aircraft Limited**, Independence, Iowa, United States
- Industrias Aeronauticas y Mecanicas, Industria Aeronáutica y Mecánica del Estado (IAME) – Argentina, (1953–1957) (Aeronautical and Mechanical Industries of the State) > DINFIA
- **Infinity Power Chutes**, Sturgis, Michigan, United States
- Iniziative Industriali Italiane, Iniziative Industriali Italiane – Italy
- **Innovation**, Innovation Engineering Inc – United States
- **INPAER** - Brazil
- Instituo Aerotecnico, Instituto Aerotécnica (Fabrica Militar de Aviones) – Argentina, (1943–1957) (IA) > DINFIA
- **Instytut Lotnictwa**, Instytut Lotnictwa – Poland
- **Inter-Air**, International Aircraft Manufacturing Inc – United States, (?-1967) > Bellanca
- **Interavia**, Interavia Konstruktorskoye Buro AO – Russia
- Interceptor Corporation, Interceptor Corporation – United States
- **International Helicopters**, International Helicopters Inc – United States
- **InterPlane Aircraft**, Zbraslavice, Czech Republic
- Interstate Engineering Corporation|**Interstate**, Interstate Engineering Corporation – United States
- **Intracom**, Intracom General Machinery SA – Switzerland
- **IPAI**, IPAI, Escola de Engenharia de Sâo Carlos – Brazil
- **IPT**, Instituto de Pesquisas Tecnologicas – Brazil
- IPTN, PT. Industri Pesawat Terbang Nusantara – Indonesia
- **IRGC**, Institute of Industrial Research and Development of the Iran Revolutionary Guard Corps – Iran
- **IRIAF**, Islamic Republic of Iran Air Force – Iran
- **Irkut**, Irkutskoye Aviatsionnoye Proizvodstvennoye Obedinenie OAO – Russia
- **IRMA**, Intreprinderea de Reparat Material Aeronautic – Romania
- **Isaacs**, John O. Isaacs – United Kingdom
- **ISAE**, Integrated Systems Aero Engineering Inc – United States
- **Island Aircraft**, Island Aircraft Ltd – United Kingdom
- **Israviation**, Israviation Ltd – Israel
- **Issoire**, Issoire Aviation SA – France
- ITV Parapentes, Épagny, Haute-Savoie, France
- Ivanov Aero, Hradec Králové, Czech Republic

== J ==
- **J & AS**, J & AS Aero Design Sp z oo – Poland
- **Jabiru**, Jabiru Aircraft Pty Ltd – Australia
- **Jackaroo**, Jackaroo Aircraft Ltd – United Kingdom
- **Jag Helicopter**, JAG Helicopter Group LLC – United States
- **James**, James Aviation – New Zealand
- **Janowski**, Jaroslaw Janowski – Poland
- **Javelin**, Javelin Aircraft Company Inc – United States
- JDM – see Avions JDM
- **Jeffair**, Jeffair Corporation – United States
- Jeof srl, Candiana, Italy
- **Jetcrafters**, Jetcrafters Inc – United States
- Jet Pocket, Chantelle, Allier, France
- **Jetprop**, Jetprop LLC – United States
- **Jetstar**, Jetstar Inc Australia
- **Jetstream**, Jetstream Aircraft Ltd – United Kingdom
- Jingmen Aviation, Jingmen, China
- **Jodel**, Avions Jodel SA – France
- **Jodel**, Société des Avions Jodel – France
- **Johnson**, Johnson Aircraft Inc – United States
- **Johnson**, Johnston Aircraft Service – United States
- Jojo Wings, Roudnice nad Labem, Czech Republic
- **Jordan Aerospace**, Jordan Aerospace Industries – Jordan
- Jovair – United States
- **Junkers**, Junkers Flugzeug- und Motorenwerke AG – Germany
- **Junqua**, Roger Junqua – France
- **Jurca**, Marcel Jurca – France
- **Just Aircraft**, Walhalla, South Carolina, United States

== K ==
- **K & S**, K & S Aircraft – Canada
- **K & S**, K & S Aircraft Supply – Canada
- **Kader**, Kader Aircraft Factory – Egypt
- **Kaiser**, Kaiser Flugzeugbau GmbH – Germany
- Laurent de Kalbermatten, Villars-sur-Glâne, Switzerland
- **Kalinauskas**, Rolandas Kalinauskas – Lithuania
- **Kaman**, Kaman Aerospace Corporation – United States
- **Kaman**, Kaman Aircraft Corporation – United States
- **Kaman**, Kaman Corporation – United States
- **Kaminskas**, Rim Kaminskas – United States
- **Kamov**, Kamov OAO – Russia
- **Kamov**, Kamov OKB – Russia
- **Kamov**, Vertoletyi Nauchno-Tekhnicheskiy Kompleks Imeni N. I. Kamova – Russia
- **Kanpur**, Indian Air Force, Aircraft Manufacturing Depot – India
- **KARI**, Korea Aerospace Research Institute – South Korea
- **Kari-Keen**, Kari-Keen Aircraft Inc – United States
- Kawanishi Aircraft Company, Kawanishi Aircraft Company – Japan
- **Kawasaki**, Kawasaki Heavy Industries Ltd – Japan
- **Kawasaki**, Kawasaki Jukogyo KK – Japan
- **Kawasaki**, Kawasaki Kokuki Kogyo K. K. – Japan
- Kayaba, Kayaba Industrial Co. – Japan
- **Kazan**, Kazansky Vertoletnyi Zavod AO – Russia
- **KEA**, Kratiko Ergostasio Aeroplanon – Greece (1925–present)
- **Keleher**, James J. Keleher – United States
- **Kelly**, Dudley R. Kelly – United States
- **Kelowna**, Kelowna Flightcraft Group – Canada
- **Kestrel (1)**, Kestrel Aircraft Company – United States
- **Kestrel (2)**, Kestrel Sport Aviation – Canada
- **Keuthan**, Keuthan Aircraft – United States, (?-1996) > Aero Adventure Aviation
- Keystone Aircraft Corporation, Keystone Aircraft Corporation – United States, (1920–1933) (Ogdensburg Aeroway Corp.) > Keystone-Loening > Curtiss-Wright
- **Khrunichev**, Gosudarstvennyi Kosmicheskii Nauchno-Proizvodstvennyi Tsentr Imeni M V Khrunicheva – Russia
- **Kieger**, André Kieger – France
- **Killingsworth**, Richard Killingsworth – United States
- **Kimball**, Jim Kimball Enterprises Inc – United States
- **Kimball**, Michael G. Kimbrel – United States
- Kimfly D.O.O., Vodice, Slovenia
- **Kinetic**, Kinetic Aviation Inc – United States
- **King's**, The King's Engineering Fellowship – United States
- Kjeller, Kjeller Flyvemaskinsfabrik – Norway
- **Kingsbury Aviation**. London, England
- **Klemm**, Hans Klemm Flugzeugbau – Germany, > Siebel
- **Klemm**, Klemm Leichtflugzeugbau GmbH – Germany
- **Klemm**, Klemm-Flugzeuge GmbH – Germany
- **KLS Composites**, KLS Composites – United States
- Kokusai, Kokusai – Japan
- **Kolb**, Kolb Aircraft Inc – United States
- **Kolb**, Kolb Company Inc – United States
- **Kolb**, The New Kolb Aircraft Company Inc – United States
- Kondor, Kondor – Germany
- Koolhoven, Koolhoven Aircraft – Netherlands
- **Korea Aerospace**, Korea Aerospace Industries Ltd – South Korea, (KAI)
- **Korean Air**, Korean Air Lines Company Ltd – South Korea
- **Kovach-Elmendorf**, Alexander Kovach and Leonard Elmendorf – United States
- **Kovacs**, Joseph Kovács – Brazil
- Kraft, Phil Kraft – United States
- Krasniye Kryl'ya – Taganrog, Russia
- Kress, Wilhelm Kress – Austria-Hungary
- **Kreider-Reisner**, Kreider-Reisner Aircraft Company Inc – United States
- Kyūshū Aircraft Company, Kyūshū Aircraft Company – Japan

== L ==
- Liaoning Ruixiang General Aviation Manufacture Company Limited, Shenyang, China
- **La France**, Neil La France – United States
- **Laird**, E. M. Laird Airplane Company – United States
- **Lake**, A.E.R.O. Aircraft Services, LLC – United States
- **Lake**, Lake Aircraft Corporation – United States
- **Lake**, Lake Aircraft Division of Consolidated Aeronautics Inc. – United States
- **Lake**, Lake Aircraft Inc. – United States
- **Lake**, Lake Amphibian Inc. – United States
- **Lambert**, Lambert Aircraft Engineering bvba – Belgium
- **Lammer Geyer**, Lammer Geyer Aviation – South Africa
- **Lancair**, Lancair Group Inc – United States
- **Lancair**, Lancair International Inc – United States
- **Lancashire**, Lancashire Aircraft Company Ltd – United Kingdom
- Larkin Aircraft, Larkin Aircraft Supply Co. – Australia, (LASCO)
- **Laser**, Laser Aerobatics – Australia
- Latécoère, Société Industrielle d'Aviation Latécoère – France
- **Laven**, Joe Laven – United States
- **Laverda**, Laverda SpA – Italy
- **LAVIASA**, Latinoamericana de Aviación S.A. – Argentina
- Lavochkin, Lavochkin (OKB-301) – Russia
- Layzell Gyroplanes – Quedgeley, Gloucester, UK
- Leading Edge Air Foils, Lyons, Wisconsin, United States
- **Lear**, Lear Inc – United States
- **Learjet**, Bombardier Aerospace Learjet – United States
- **Learjet**, Learjet Corporation – United States, (?-1990) > Bombardier Aerospace
- **Learjet**, Learjet Industries Inc – United States
- **Learjet**, Learjet Corporation – United States
- **Learjet**, Learjet Inc – United States
- **Leavens**, Leavens Brothers Ltd – Canada
- **Lederlin**, François Lederlin – France
- **Legend**, Legend Aircraft Inc – United States
- Leger Aviation, Archiac, France
- **Leger**, Gilles Leger – Canada
- LeO, Lioré et Olivier – France
- Les Mureaux – see ANF Mureaux
- **Let**, Let Národní Podnik – Czechoslovakia
- **Let**, Let AS – Czech Republic
- Letov, Letov – Czechoslovakia
- Levasseur, Pierre Levasseur – France
- Levy, Constructions Aeronautiques J. Levy – France
- **Leza AirCam Corporation** — see Lockwood Aircraft
- **Leza-Lockwood** — see Lockwood Aircraft
- **Liberty (1)**, Liberty Aeronautical – United States
- **Liberty (2)**, Liberty Aerospace Inc – United States
- **Lichtwerk**, NV Lichtwerk – Netherlands
- **Light Aero**, Light Aero Inc – United States
- **Light Miniature Aircraft**, Okeechobee, Florida, United States
- **Light Wing**, Light Wing AG – Switzerland
- **Lightning Bug**, Lightning Bug Aircraft Corporation – United States
- Lilienthal, Otto Lilienthal – Germany
- Linke-Hofmann, Linke-Hofmann Werke A. G. – Germany
- **Lipnur**, Lembaga Industri Penerbangan Nurtanio – Indonesia
- **Lisunov**, Lisunov OKB – Russia
- **Liteflite**, Botany, New South Wales, Australia
- LiteWing Aircraft, Caryville, Tennessee, United States
- **Little Wing Autogyros, Inc.**, Mayflower, Arkansas, United States
- **Lmaasa**, Lockheed Martin Aircraft Argentina SA – Argentina
- **Load Ranger**, Load Ranger Inc – United States
- **Lockheed Corporation** – United States, (1912–1996) > Lockheed Martin
- **Lockheed Martin**, Lockheed Martin Corporation – United States, (1996–present)
- **Lockheed Martin-Boeing**, see Lockheed Martin and Boeing – United States
- **Lockheed-Azcarate**, Lockheed-Azcarate SA – Mexico, (LASA)
- **Lockheed-Boeing**, see Lockheed and Boeing – United States
- Lockheed-Kaiser, Avions Lockheed-Kaiser – Argentina
- **Lockwood Aircraft Corporation** — United States
- **Loehle**, Loehle Aircraft Corporation – United States
- Loening Aeronautical, Loening Aircraft Co. Inc. – United States, (Loening Aeronautical Engineering Corp. or Grover Loening Aircraft Co. Inc.)
- Lohner, Jacob Lohner Werke und Sohn – Austria-Hungary
- Loire, Loire – France
- **Lombardi**, Aeronautica Lombardi – Italy
- **Lombardi**, Francis Lombardi & Companie – Italy
- **Long**, David Long – United States
- **Longren**, Longren Aircraft Company Inc – United States
- **Lopresti**, LoPresti Inc – United States
- **Loravia**, Lorraine Aviation – France
- Lowe, Willard & Fowler Engineering Company
- Letecké Opravovne Trencin SP|**LOT**, Letecké Opravovne Trencin SP – Slovakia
- **Loving-Wayne**, Neal V. Loving, Wayne Aircraft Company – United States
- **LTV**, Ling-Temco-Vought Inc – United States
- **LTV**, LTV Aerospace Corporation – United States
- Lualdi-Tassotti, Lualdi-Tassotti – Italy
- **Lucas**, Emile Lucas – France
- Luftfahrzeug-Gesellschaft m.b.H. (LFG), Germany, airships 1909–1932, aeroplanes 1915–1933
- Luftschiffbau Schütte-Lanz, Germany, rigid airships 1909–1917, aeroplanes 1915–1918
- Luftverkehrsgesellschaft m.b.H., Berlin-Johannisthal – Germany
- **Lunds Tekniske**, Lunds Tekniske – Norway
- **Lundy**, Brian Lundy – United States
- **Luscombe**, Luscombe Aircraft Corporation – United States
- **Luscombe**, Luscombe Airplane Corporation – United States
- **Luscombe**, Luscombe Airplane Development Corporation – United States
- **Luton**, Luton Aircraft Ltd – United Kingdom
- LWD, Lotnicze Warsztaty Doświadczalne – Poland, (Experimental Aviation Workshops)
- LWS, Lubelska Wytwórnia Samolotów – Poland, (Lublin Aircraft Factory)
- **Lyavin**, Peter Lyavin – Russia

== See also ==
- Aircraft
- List of aircraft engine manufacturers
- List of aircraft manufacturers

== Bibliography ==
- Green, William (1986) [1970]. The Warplanes of the Third Reich. New York: Galahad Books. ISBN 0-88365-666-3.
