= Layzell =

Layzell may refer to:

- Layzell Gyroplanes, a British aircraft manufacturer started by Gary Layzell
  - Layzell Cricket, a Layzell Gyroplanes gyroplane design
  - Layzell Merlin, a Layzell Gyroplanes gyroplane design
- Alastair Layzell (born 1958), Jersey television producer and politician
- Martyn Layzell, British Anglican minister
- Naomi Layzell, English footballer
- Paul Layzell (born 1957), British software engineer, academic, and academic administrator
