= H&E (disambiguation) =

H&E stain (Hematoxylin and eosin stain) is a tissue stain used in histology.

H&E may also refer to:

- H&E naturist, originally Health and Efficiency, a monthly British magazine
- H&E Paramotores, a Spanish paramotor manufacturer
  - H&E Paramotores Corsario
  - H&E Paramotores Simonini
  - H&E Paramotores Solo
  - H&E Paramotores Ziklon
