= Fajr F.3 =

Iranian training/utility aircraft

General information
- Type: Training aircraft
- Manufacturer: Fajr Aviation & Composites Industry
- Status: Active service
- Primary user: Iranian Air Force

History
- Manufactured: 2001—
- Introduction date: Iran
- First flight: 1995

Fajr F.3 (Persian: فجر اف.۳) is an Iranian full composite four-seat training/touring aircraft built by Fajr Aviation & Composites Industry. First flown in 1995, production commenced in 2001 after the aircraft was certified to JAR-23 standard. The aircraft was noted by the Experimental Aircraft Association to bear a resemblance to the Cirrus SR20.

== Design and development ==
The aircraft features a cantilever low-wing, a single-seat, a four-seat cabin accessed by gull-winged doors, tricycle landing gear and a single engine in tractor configuration.

The aircraft is made from composite material. Its 10.50 m (34.4 ft) span wing mounts flaps. The standard engine used is the 270 hp (201 kW) Lycoming AEIO-540-L185 four-stroke powerplant.

== Specifications (Fajr F.3) ==
Data from Jane's All The World's Aircraft 2003–2004

General characteristics

- Crew: 1
- Capacity: 3 pax
- Length: 8.07 m (26 ft 6 in)
- Wingspan: 10.5 m (34 ft 5 in)
- Height: 3.05 m (10 ft 0 in)
- Wing area: 14.02 m^{2} (150.9 sq ft)
- Airfoil: Horstmann-Quast HQ-42E
- Empty weight: 1,100 kg (2,425 lb)
- Max takeoff weight: 1,580 kg (3,483 lb)
- Fuel capacity: 212 L (56 US gal; 47 imp gal)
- Cabin Width: 1.25 m (4 ft 1 in)
- Powerplant: 1 × Lycoming AEIO-540-L1B5 6-cylinder air-cooled horizontally-opposed piston engine, 201 kW (270 hp)
- Propellers: 3-bladed constant-speed propeller

Performance

- Maximum speed: 296 km/h (184 mph, 160 kn)
- Cruise speed: 267 km/h (166 mph, 144 kn)
- Stall speed: 104 km/h (65 mph, 56 kn)
- Never exceed speed: 370 km/h (230 mph, 200 kn)
- Range: 1,129 km (702 mi, 610 nmi)
- Endurance: 6 hours 15 minutes
- Service ceiling: 5,480 m (17,980 ft)
- Rate of climb: 5.2 m/s (1,020 ft/min)
- Take-off run: 310 m (1,017 ft)
- Landing run: 370 m (1,214 ft)

== See also ==
- List of Iranian Air Force aircraft
- Iranian military industry
- Chakavak (plane)
