= Vearne C. Babcock =

American engineer (1887–1972)

Vearne Clifton Babcock (28 April 1887 – 15 February 1972) was an American aeronautical engineer and aircraft designer in the first half of the twentieth century. He was one of the 598 aviators who were members of the Early Birds of Aviation.

== Biography ==
He was born at Benton Harbor, Michigan on 28 April 1887.

An energetic young man, Babcock worked as a jockey around the turn of the century. The Times of Philadelphia reported that Vearne C. Babcock would ride in the first race, six furlongs, at Delmar Park, St. Louis, Missouri, on 22 October 1901. The Buffalo Express carried results the following day of the races held 5 June 1902 at the Saint Louis fairground, in which Terra Incognita was ridden to a fourth-place finish by Babcock in the sixth race of the day, over a course of one mile, 70 yards.

He began his flying and aeronautical career in 1905, going aloft for the first time in that year. He was the fifth person to fly, and in an aircraft which copied the Wright Flyer design. "Asked how he knew what to do since he had never seen an airplane, let alone fly one up to the time of that eventful hop, Babcock said, 'Well, we were even. The airplane didn't know how to fly and neither did I.' Either Babcock or the airplane forgot after one try. He made a successful 150 foot jump in the morning, tried again in the afternoon and crashed." It was the first of many. "I broke many bones and many pocketbooks in crashes," he recalled in an interview in 1958. He would fly until he was 60. Then "my wife put her foot down," he told The Daytona Beach Morning Journal.

"Babcock moved to Seattle, Washington, and built a second Wright copy in 1909, the same year he and a partner formed Babcock-Breininger Aeroplane Supply Co., building several more derivative aircraft. Babcock moved on to several other aviation training and engineering activities throughout the USA" through 1914. He was connected with various engineering and aircraft manufacturing companies, during which time a number of early aircraft designs were developed under his personal supervision. He toured the United States and many foreign countries demonstrating American-built airplanes.

== Military service ==
In 1914, at the outbreak of the World War, he went to France and enlisted in the French Foreign Legion. In 1916, he was severely wounded in an aerial combat on the Western Front, and was invalidated to the United States.

Babcock then served as head of the propeller department of the Glenn L. Martin Company; in the pilot training school at Naval Air Station Pensacola, Florida; and as a designer on the de Havilland DH.4 for the U.S. Army Air Service.

"He trained many Army student pilots and wrote the curriculum for student training courses. Since 1919, he has devoted his entire time to airplane design and research and the building of experimental and commercial planes."

Babcock was a member of the American Legion at Elyria, Ohio, as of 1919, with U.S. Naval Aviation listed as his affiliation.

== Interwar years ==
Babcock formed the Babcock Aircraft Co. in Akron, Ohio, in 1924. "The company experienced several reorganizations and in 1930 it was acquired by the S. Taubman Aircraft Co., and became known also as Babcock-Vlcek Co."

Babcock's biplane design, The Teal, was built at Stow Field, near Kent, Ohio, and was flown in the 1926 National Air Tour, but was written off on the first day when the pilot ran out of gas just short of Chicago and crash-landed.

Other Babcock designs included the side-by-side two-seat shoulder-wing cabin monoplane Babcock-Vlcek X Airmaster, of which one example, registered NX20490, was built. The LC-13 Taube (Dove) and LC-13A Taube were derived from the X Airmaster. The LC-13A "featured an open cockpit and an enlarged vertical tail. It was powered by a 75 hp Roché L-267 four-cylinder air-cooled inverted in-line engine. Originally designed and manufactured by Rover of Lansing, Michigan, the manufacture of the 267 cu.in (4.38 L) engine was taken over by Jean A Roché of Dayton, Ohio, in 1932." The LC-13A bore Aircraft Type Certificate 2-389. The design was acquired by Bartlett Mfg Co., of Rosemead, California, but an attempt to the revive the design as Bartlett 3 Zephyr failed with the outbreak of World War II. A post-war effort to market it also failed.

Babcock incorporated The Beacon Microphone Company at Akron, Ohio, on 9 April 1934. The registration number was 158879. Very little information on the company has come to light. The registration was cancelled by the tax department with notification on 15 November 1935.

== Gliders ==
In 1939, Babcock moved operations to Florida, where, on 12 May, Babcock Aircraft Corporation was incorporated under laws of the state of Florida with an authorized capitalization of $150,000. Babcock served as vice-president and chief engineer. A manufacturing facility was acquired in DeLand for the production of light aircraft, which was dedicated on 10 June 1940.

Vearne Babcock organized the DeLand Pool by 1942, a complex of small manufacturing and fabricating shops in Central Florida. Babcock Aircraft's first contract was for assembly stands on which airplane motors could be assembled. The plans called for worm gears and drives that Babcock could not produce. They turned the contract over to the LaRoe Machine Shop of Eustis, Florida, part of the pool. The LaRoe Family Home Historic District is now on the National Register of Historic Places.

This firm produced 60 Waco CG-4 assault gliders during World War II under the designation CG-4A-BBs, in two batches. The concern had ceased operation by the end of the war, however, and Babcock retired from aviation.

== Hull design ==
Babcock applied for a United States patent on 22 March 1950 for the design of a catamaran-style boat hull which offered "the several advantageous characteristics of good stability, longitudinal, lateral and directional; capability of relatively high speeds at low power; maneuverability; shallow draft; and susceptibility to economical manufacture, operation and maintenance." He was awarded Patent Number US2666406 on 19 January 1954. He called the design the Polynesian Clipper powered catamaran, the name of which was filed with the Library of Congress, Catalog Office, on 27 August 1954.

== Death ==
Babcock died in Volusia, Florida, on 15 February 1972.
