= List of aircraft manufacturers (D–G) =

This is a list of aircraft manufacturers sorted alphabetically by International Civil Aviation Organization (ICAO)/common name. Each listing contains the ICAO/common name (presented in bold), manufacturer's name(s), country and other data, with the known years of operation in parentheses.

The existence of an ICAO name does not mean that a manufacturer is still in operation today, just that some of the aircraft produced by that manufacturer are still flying.

== D ==
- **DAC**, Dutch Aeroplane Company VOF – Netherlands
- **Damoure-Fabre**, Damoure et Fabre – France
- **D'Apuzzo**, Nicholas E. D'Apuzzo – United States
- DAR, Darjawna Aeroplanna Rabotilniza – Bulgaria, (Dargeavna Aeroplanna Rabotilnitsa – Country Airplane Factory)
- Darracq Motor Engineering Company
- **Dart**, Dart Aircraft Company – United States
- Dart Aircraft Limited – United Kingdom
- **DASA**, Daimler-Benz Aerospace AG – Germany, (1989–2000) > EADS
- **DASA**, Deutsche Aerospace AG – Germany
- **DASA-Rockwell**, see DASA and ROCKWELL – Germany/United States
- **Dassault**, Avions Marcel Dassault – France, (1945–1969) > Dassault-Breguet
- **Dassault-Breguet**, Avions Marcel Dassault-Bréguet Aviation – France, (1969–1990) > Dassault Aviation
- **Dassault**, Dassault Aviation (1990–present) – France
- **Dassault-Breguet/dornier**, see DASSAULT-BREGUET and DORNIER – France/Switzerland
- **Dätwyler**, MDC Max Dätwyler AG – Switzerland
- **Davis**, Leeon D. Davis – United States
- Dayton-Wright, Dayton-Wright Airplane Co. – United States, (?-1923) > Consolidated Aircraft
- **De Havilland**, The De Havilland Aircraft Company Ltd – United Kingdom, (1920–1958) (DH) > Hawker Siddeley
- **De Havilland Australia**, The De Havilland Aircraft Company Pty Ltd – Australia, (DHA) > Boeing
- **De Havilland Canada**, Bombardier Aerospace De Havilland – Canada, (1928–1989) (DHC) > Bombardier Aerospace
- **De Havilland Canada**, De Havilland Division of Boeing of Canada Ltd – Canada
- **De Havilland Canada**, De Havilland Inc – Canada
- **De Havilland Canada**, The De Havilland Aircraft of Canada Ltd – Canada
- **De Schelde**, Koninklijke Maatschappij De Schelde – Netherlands
- **Deborde-Rolland**, Yves Deborde et Jean-Louis Rolland – France
- **Delisle**, Club Aeronautique Delisle Inc – Canada
- Denel Aerospace Systems, Denel Aerospace Systems, Denel Aviation – South Africa
- **Denize**, Robert Denize – France
- **Denney**, Denney Aerocraft Company – United States
- Department of Aircraft Production, Australian government, Australia, (1939–1941) later known as Government Aircraft Factories
- **Derazona**, PT Derazona Aviation Industry – Indonesia
- **Derringer**, Derringer Aircraft Company LLC – United States
- Detroit Aircraft Corporation, Detroit Aircraft Corporation – United States, (July 10, 1922 – October 27, 1931)
- Deutsche Airbus, Deutsche Airbus GmbH – Germany
- DFS, Deutsche Forschungsanstalt für Segelflug – Germany, (1925–1945) (Deutsches Forschungsinstitut fur Segelflug – German Research Institute for Sailplane Flight)
- **Dewoitine**, Constructions Aéronautiques Emile Dewoitine – France
- **Dewoitine**, Société Aéronautique Française, Avions Dewoitine – France
- **DF Helicopters**, DF Helicopters SRL – Italy
- DFW, Deutsche Flugzeugwerke – Germany
- **DG Flugzeugbau**, DG Flugzeugbau GmbH – Germany
- **Diamond**, Diamond Aircraft Industries GmbH – Austria
- **Diamond**, Diamond Aircraft Industries Inc – Canada
- **Distar Air**, Ústí nad Orlicí, Czech Republic
- **Dickey**, Shirl Dickey Enterprises – United States
- **Dijkman-Dulkes**, Cor Dijkman-Dulkes – Netherlands
- **DINFIA**, Dirección Nacional de Investigaciones y Fabricaciones Aeronáuticas – Argentina, (1957–?)
- **DKBA FGUP**, Federal Unitary State Enterprise, "Dolgoprudniy Design
- Bureau of Automatics" ("DIRIZHABLESTROI USSR ENTERPRISE" in 1932–1940) – key state Russian manufacturer of airships, balloons, aerostats, blimps. – Russian Federation
- **Dirgantara**, PT Dirgantara Indonesia – Indonesia
- **DM Aerospace**, DM Aerospace Ltd – United Kingdom
- Doak, Doak Aircraft Company – United States
- DOMA, DOMA INDUSTRIAL LTDA – BRAZIL
- Donnet – France
- Donnet-Denhaut – France
- **Dorna**, H F Dorna Company – Iran
- **Dornier**, AG für Dornier-Flugzeuge – Switzerland
- **Dornier**, Dornier GmbH – Germany, (?-1959) > FUS
- **Dornier**, Dornier Luftfahrt GmbH – Germany, (?-1989) > DASA
- **Dornier**, Dornier-Werke GmbH – Germany
- **Douglas**, Douglas Aircraft Company Inc – United States, (1920–1967) > McDonnell-Douglas
- **Downer**, Downer Aircraft Industries Inc – United States
- **Dragon Fly**, Dragon Fly Srl – Italy
- **Dream**, Dream Aircraft Inc – Canada
- **Driggs**, Driggs Aircraft Corporation – United States
- **Druine**, Avions Roger Druine – France
- DSK, DSK Aircraft – United States
- DSK Airmotive, DSK Airmotive – United States
- **Dubna**, Proizvodstvenno-Tekhnichesky Kompleks Dubnenskogo Mashinostroitelnogo Zavod AO – Russia
- Dudek Paragliding, Bydgoszcz, Poland
- Dufaux, Armand and Henri Dufaux – Switzerland
- Duigan, John Duigan – Australia
- Dumod, Dumod Corp. – United States
- Dumoulin Aero – Ans, Belgium
- **Durand**, William H. Durand – United States
- **Duruble**, Roland Duruble – France
- du Temple, Félix du Temple – France
- **Dyke**, John W. Dyke – United States
- **Dyn'Aéro**, Société Dyn'Aéro – France
- Dynamic Sport, Kielce, Poland
- D'Yves Air Pub, La Chapelle-en-Vexin, France
- Daher aircraft
- Deutsche aircraft

== E ==
- E. D. Abbott – see Abbott
- **E & K**, E & K Sp z oo – Poland
- **EAA**, Experimental Aircraft Association Inc – United States
- **EAC**, Etudes Aéronautiques & Commerciales SARL – France
- EADS, European Aeronautic Defence and Space Company – France/Germany/Spain, (2000–present) (EADS)
- EADS 3 Sigma (formerly **3 Sigma**) – Greece
- **Eagle**, Eagle Aircraft Company – United States
- **Eagle Aircraft**, Eagle Aircraft Australia Ltd – Australia
- **Eagle Aircraft**, Eagle Aircraft International – Australia
- **Eagle Aircraft**, Eagle Aircraft Pty Ltd – Australia
- Eagles Wing Corporation, Normandy, Tennessee, United States
- **Early Bird**, Early Bird Aircraft Company – United States
- EasyUp, Medford, Oregon, United States
- EAY – Empresa Aeronáutica Ypiranga – Brazil
- Eberhart, Eberhart – United States
- **Eclipse**, Eclipse Aviation Corporation – United States
- **Ector**, Ector Aircraft Company – United States
- Edel Paragliders, Gwangju, South Korea
- **Edgar Percival**, Edgar Percival Aircraft Ltd. (defunct) – United Kingdom
- **Edgley**, Edgley Aircraft Ltd – United Kingdom
- **EDRA**, EDRA Aeronáutica – Brazil
- **EDRA**, EDRA Helicentro Peças e Manutençao – Brazil
- EEL (Entwicklung und Erprobung von Leichtflugzeugen), Putzbrunn, Germany
- **EHI**, EH Industries Ltd – United Kingdom/Italy
- **Eich**, James P. Eich – United States
- **EIRI**, Eiriavion OY – Finland
- **EIS**, EIS Aircraft GmbH – Germany
- **Ekolot**, PPHU Ekolot – Poland
- **EFW**, Eidgenössische Flugzeugwerke Emmen – Switzerland, (Federal Aircraft Factory)
- **ELA Aviación**, ELA Aviación SL – Spain
- **Elbit**, Elbit Systems Ltd – Israel
- Elicotteri Meridionali, Elicotteri Meridionali – Italy, (1967–?)
- **Elitar**, Ehlitar OOO – Russia
- Ellison-Mahon Aircraft, – US (Seattle, Washington)
- **Elmwood**, Elmwood Aviation – Canada
- **Emair**, Emair Inc – United States
- **Emair**, Emair, Division of Emroth Company – United States
- **EMBRAER**, Empresa Brasileira de Aeronáutica SA – Brazil
- **EMBRAER-FMA**, see EMBRAER and FMA – Brazil/Argentina
- **Emroth**, Emroth Company – United States
- **ENAER**, Empresa Nacional de Aeronáutica – Chile
- **English Electric**, English Electric Aviation Ltd – United Kingdom, (?-1959) > British Aircraft Corporation
- **English Electric**, English Electric Company Ltd – United Kingdom
- **Enstrom**, R. J. Enstrom Corporation – United States
- **Enstrom**, The Enstrom Helicopter Corporation – United States
- **Epervier**, Epervier Aviation SA – Belgium
- Epps, Ben T. Epps – United States
- **ERCO**, Engineering and Research Corporation – United States
- **ERPALS**, Erpals Industrie, Etudes et Réalisations de Prototypes pour l'Aviation Légère et Sportive – France
- Esnault-Pelterie, Robert Esnault-Pelterie – France
- **Ethiopian Airlines**, Ethiopian Airlines Enterprise – Ethiopia
- **Ethiopian Airlines**, Ethiopian Airlines SC – Ethiopia
- Etrich, Etrich – Austria
- Euler, Euler – Germany
- **Eurocopter**, Eurocopter Canada Ltd – Canada, (1992–present)
- **Eurocopter**, Eurocopter GIE – France/Germany
- **Eurocopter**, Eurocopter SA – France/Germany
- **Eurocopter**, Eurocopter SAS – France/Germany
- **Eurocopter-Kawasaki**, see EUROCOPTER and KAWASAKI – France/Germany/Japan
- **Euro-Enaer**, Euro-Enaer Holding BV – Netherlands
- **Eurofighter**, Eurofighter Jagdflugzeug GmbH – Germany/UK/Italy/Spain
- **Euronef**, Euronef SA – Belgium
- **Europa**, Europa Aviation Ltd – United Kingdom
- **Eurospace**, Eurospace Costruzioni Srl – Italy
- **Evangel**, Evangel Aircraft Corporation – United States
- **Evans**, Evans Aircraft – United States
- **Evans**, W. Samuel Evans – United States
- **Evektor-Aerotechnik**, Evektor-Aerotechnik AS – Czech Republic
- **Evolution Aircraft**, Redmond, Oregon, United States
- EWR, Entwicklungsring-Süd – Germany
- **Excalibur**, Excalibur Aviation Company – United States
- **Exclusive**, Exclusive Aviation – United States
- **Experimental Aviation**, Experimental Aviation Inc – United States
- Explorair, Ebringen, Breisgau-Hochschwarzwald, Baden-Württemberg, Germany
- **Explorer (1)**, Explorer Aviation – United States
- **Explorer (2)**, Explorer Aircraft Inc – United States
- **Express**, Express Aircraft Company LLC – United States
- **Express**, Express Design Inc – United States
- **Extra**, Extra Flugzeugbau GmbH – Germany
- **Extra**, Extra Flugzeugproduktions- und Vertriebs- GmbH – Germany

== F ==
- **F+W Emmen**, Eidgenössisches Flugzeugwerk-Fabrique Fédérale d'Avions-Fabbrica Federale d'Aeroplani – B817
- Fabrica de Avioanes, Fabrica de Avioanes SET – Romania
- Fabrica Militar de Aviones, Fábrica Militar de Aviones – Argentina, (1927–1957) (FMA, or Military Aircraft Factory) > DINFIA > Lockheed Martin Aircraft Argentina SA
- **Fairchild (1)**, Fairchild Aircraft Corporation – United States, (1925–1996) > FairchildDornier
- **Fairchild (1)**, Fairchild Aircraft Inc – United States
- **Fairchild (1)**, Fairchild Aviation Corporation – United States
- **Fairchild (1)**, Fairchild Engine & Airplane Corporation – United States
- **Fairchild (1)**, Fairchild Industries Inc – United States
- **Fairchild (1)**, Fairchild Stratos Corporation – United States
- **Fairchild (2)**, Fairchild Aircraft Ltd. (Canada)
- **Fairchild Dornier**, Fairchild Aerospace Corporation – United States/Germany, (1996–2002) > Avcraft, M7 Aerospace
- **Fairchild Hiller**, Fairchild Hiller Corporation – United States
- **Fairchild Swearingen**, Fairchild Swearingen Corporation – United States
- **Fairey**, Fairey Aviation Company Ltd – United Kingdom
- **Fairtravel**, Fairtravel Ltd – United Kingdom
- **Fajr**, Fajr Aviation & Composites Industry – Iran
- **Falconar**, Falconar Air Engineering – Canada
- **Falconar**, Falconar Aircraft Ltd – Canada
- **Falconar**, Falconar Avia Inc – Canada
- Fanaero-Chile, Fanaero-Chile – Chile
- **Farigoux**, Georges Farigoux – France
- Farman Aviation Works, Farman Aviation Works – France, (1914–1936) > Ateliers Aéronautiques de Suresnes, SNCAC
- **Farrington**, Farrington Aircraft Corporation, Paducah, Kentucky, United States
- Fauvel, Fauvel – France
- Ferber, Ferber – France, (1906) > Antoinette
- **Feugray**, G. Feugray – France
- **FFA**, FFA Flugzeugwerke Altenrhein AG – Switzerland
- **FFA**, Flug und Fahrzeugwerke AG – Switzerland
- **FFT**, Gesellschaft für Flugzeug- und Faserverbund Technologie – Germany
- FFV, Försvarets Fabriksverk – Sweden, (later Förenade Fabriksverken)
- **FIAT**, Fiat SpA – Italy, (?-1969) > Aeritalia
- **Fieseler**, Fieseler Flugzeugbau – Germany
- **Fieseler**, Gerhard Fieseler Werke GmbH – Germany
- **Fighter Escort Wings**, Fighter Escort Wings – United States
- **Fike**, William J. Fike – United States
- **Finavitec**, Patria Finavitec OY – Finland
- Firebird Sky Sports, Bitburg, Germany
- **Fisher**, Fisher Flying Products Inc – United States
- **Fisher Aero**, Fisher Aero Corporation – United States
- **Flaglor**, K. Flaglor – United States
- **Flair**, Flair Aviation Company – United States
- **Fläming Air**, Fläming Air GmbH – Germany
- **Fleet**, Fleet Aircraft Inc – United States, (1928–1929) > Consolidated Aircraft > Fleet Aircraft of Canada
- **Fleet**, Fleet Aircraft Ltd – Canada, (1930–1957)
- **Fleet**, Fleet Manufacturing & Aircraft Ltd – Canada
- **Fleet**, Fleet Manufacturing Ltd – Canada
- Fleetwings, Fleetwings, Inc. – United States
- **Fletcher**, Fletcher Aviation Company – United States
- **Fletcher**, Fletcher Aviation Corporation – United States
- Flettner, Flettner – Germany
- **Flight Design**, Flight Design GmbH – Germany
- **Flight Engineers**, Flight Engineers Ltd – New Zealand
- **Flightworks**, Flightworks Corporation – United States
- **Flitzer**, Flitzer Aero Publishing Company – United States
- **FLS**, FLS Aerospace (Lovaux) Ltd – United Kingdom
- **FLSZ**, Flight Level Six-Zero Inc – United States
- Flug und Fahrzeugwerke, Flug und Fahrzeugwerke – Switzerland
- **Flug Werk**, Flug Werk GmbH – Germany
- Flugzeug Union Süd, Flugzeug-Union Süd GmbH – Germany
- **Flyer**, Flyer Industria Aeronautica Ltda – Brazil
- Fly Castelluccio Paramotor Paragliding and Trike srl, Ascoli Piceno, Italy
- Flygindustri, AB Flygindustri – Sweden, (1925–1935) (AFI) > Malmö Flygindustri
- Flygkompaniets tygverkstäder Malmslätt (FVM) – Sweden
- Flying Machines s.r.o., Czech Republic.
- **FMA**, Fábrica Militar de Aviones – Argentina
- **FMA**, Fábrica Militar de Aviones SA – Argentina
- Focke Achgelis, Focke-Achgelis – Germany
- **Focke-Wulf**, Focke-Wulf Flugzeugbau AG – Germany
- **Focke-Wulf**, Focke-Wulf GmbH – Germany
- **Fokker**, Fokker BV – Netherlands
- **Fokker**, Fokker-VFW BV – Netherlands
- **Fokker**, NV Koninklijke Nederlandsche Vliegtuigenfabriek Fokker – Netherlands
- **Fokker**, NV Koninklijke Nederlandse Vliegtuigenfabriek Fokker – Netherlands
- Folland, Folland – United Kingdom, (1937–1959)
- Ford Motor Company, Ford – United States, (1925–?)
- **Fornaire**, Fornaire Aircraft Company – United States
- **Forney**, Forney Aircraft Manufacturing Company – United States
- Foster Wikner, Foster Wikner – United Kingdom
- **Fouga**, Etablissements Fouga et Cie – France
- **Found**, Found Aircraft Canada Inc – Canada
- **Found**, Found Brothers Aviation Ltd – Canada
- **Four Winds**, Four Winds Aircraft LLC – United States
- **Fournier**, Avions Fournier SA – France
- **Fournier**, Bureau d'Etudes Fournier – France
- **Fournier**, Fournier Aviation – France
- **Fournier**, René Fournier – France
- **Fowler Airplane Corporation** - San Francisco, California
- **Foxcon Aviation**, Mackay, Queensland, Australia
- **Frakes**, Frakes Aviation Inc – United States
- **Freebird Airplane Company**, Marshville, North Carolina, United States
- **Free Bird Innovations, Inc**, Detroit Lakes, Minnesota, United States
- FreeX GmbH, Egling, Germany
- **Free Spirit**, Free Spirit Aircraft Company Inc – United States
- **Freedom Master**, Freedom Master Corporation – United States
- **Freewing**, Freewing Aerial Robotics Corporation – United States
- **Friedrichshafen**, Friedrichshafen, Württemberg, Germany > Dornier (1922)
- **Frontier**, Frontier Aircraft Inc – United States
- **Fry**, Fry Aircraft Design – Switzerland
- **Fuji**, Fuji Heavy Industries Ltd – Japan
- **Fuji**, Fuji Jukogyo K. K. – Japan
- **Fujikura Kougyou Kabushikigaishya**, Fujikura Aircraft Industry Co. Ltd. – Japan
- **Funk**, Funk Aircraft Company – United States
- FVM, Centrala Verkstader Malmslatt – Sweden

== G ==
- **GAF**, Government Aircraft Factories – Australia, (1941–1987) > Aerospace Technologies of Australia
- **Gannet**, Gannet Aircraft – United States
- **Ganzavia**, Ganzavia Kft – Hungary
- **Gardan**, Avions Yves Gardan – France (see Constructions Aéronautiques du Béarn)
- **Garland**, The Garland Aircraft Company – United Kingdom
- Garland Aerospace, Camden, New South Wales, Australia
- **Garrison**, Peter Garrison – United States
- **Gastambide-Mengin**, Gastambide-Mengin – France
- **Gatard**, Avions A. Gatard – France
- **Gatard**, Société des Avions Statoplan, A. Gatard – France
- **Gates Learjet**, Gates Learjet Corporation – United States
- **Gavilan**, El Gavilán SA – Colombia
- **GEFA-FLUG GmbH**, GEFA-FLUG GmbH – Germany, (1975–present) (Gesellschaft zur Entwicklung und Förderung Aerostatischer Flugsysteme GmbH – Company for the Development and Promotion of Aerostatic Aerial Systems)
- **Gemini Powered Parachutes**, Culver, Indiana, United States
- Genair, Genair – South Africa
- **General Aircraft**, General Aircraft Corporation – United States
- **General Aircraft Limited**, General Aircraft Ltd – United Kingdom, (1931–1948) (GAL) > Blackburn and General Aircraft
- **General Atomics**, General Atomics – United States
- **General Avia**, General Avia Costruzioni Aeronautiche SRL – Italy
- General Aviation Design Bureau of Ukraine – Kiev, Ukraine
- **General Dynamics**, General Dynamics Corporation – United States
- **General Motors**, Eastern Aircraft Division of General Motors Corporation – United States
- **German Bianco**, German Bianco SA, Fabrica Argentina de Aerodinos – Argentina
- **Giles**, Richard Giles – United States
- Gin Gliders, Yongin, South Korea
- **Gippsland**, **Mahindra Aerospace** India – Australia
- Giravia, Giravia – France
- **Glaser-Dirks**, Glaser-Dirks Flugzeugbau GmbH – Germany
- **Glasflügel** – Germany
- **Glass**, Glass Aircraft de Colombia – Colombia
- **Glassic**, Glassic Composites LLC – United States
- Glendower Aircraft Company, Glendower Aircraft Company – United Kingdom
- **Global**, Global Helicopter Technology Inc – United States
- **Globe**, Globe Aircraft Corporation – United States
- **Gloster Aircraft Company Ltd** – United Kingdom, > Whitworth Gloster Aircraft Ltd. 1961 Hawker Siddeley Group
- **Gloucestershire Aircraft**, Gloucestershire Aircraft Co. – United Kingdom, > Gloster 1926
- Głowiński, Bronisław Głowiński – Poland
- **Goair**, Goair Products – Australia
- **Golden Circle**, Golden Circle Air Inc – United States
- **Gomolzig**, Herbert Gomolzig Ingenieurbüro – Germany
- **Goodrich**, Goodrich Corporation – Headquarters North Carolina – United States
- **Goodyear**, Goodyear Aircraft Corporation – United States
- Gothaer Waggonfabrik, Gothaer Waggonfabrik – Germany, (GWF)
- Gourdou-Leseurre, Gourdou-Leseurre – France
- Government Aircraft Factory, Government Aircraft Factory – Finland
- Gradient sro, Prague, Czech Republic
- Grahame-White, Grahame-White Aviation Co. Ltd. – United Kingdom, (Claude Grahame-White)
- Granville Brothers Aircraft, Granville Brothers Aircraft – United States
- **Great Lakes**, Great Lakes Aircraft Company Inc – United States
- **Great Lakes**, Great Lakes Aircraft Corporation – United States
- **Great Lakes**, Great Lakes Aircraft Inc – United States
- **Great Plains**, Great Plains Aircraft Supply Company Inc – United States
- Green Sky Adventures, Hawthorne, Florida, United States
- **Grega**, John W. Grega – United States (see Pietenpol Air Camper)
- Grémont, Grémont – France
- **Griffon**, Griffon Aerospace Inc – United States
- **Grinvalds**, Jean Grinvalds – France
- **Grob**, Burkhart Grob Flugzeugbau GmbH & Co kg – Germany
- **Groen**, Groen Brothers Aviation Inc – United States
- **Grosso**, Grosso Aircraft Inc – United States
- **Grove**, Grove Aircraft Company – United States
- **Grover**, Grover Aircraft Corporation – United States
- **Grumman**, Grumman Aircraft Engineering Corporation – United States
- **Grumman**, Grumman Corporation – United States, (1930–1994)
- **Grumman American**, Grumman American Aviation Corporation – United States
- **Guizhou**, Guizhou Aviation Industrial Corporation – China
- **Gulfstream Aerospace**, Gulfstream Aerospace Corporation – United States, (1978–)
- **Gulfstream American**, Gulfstream American Corporation – United States
- Gyro-Kopp-Ters, Lake City Florida, United States
- **Gyroflug**, Gyroflug Ingenieursgesellschaft mbH – Germany

== See also ==
- Aircraft
- List of aircraft engine manufacturers
- List of aircraft manufacturers
