= LC-13 =

LC-13 may refer to:

- Babcock LC-13, a United States light civil aircraft
- Cape Canaveral Air Force Station Launch Complex 13, a launch complex which was used by Atlas rockets and missiles between 1958 and 1978
