= Southern Condor =

American powered parachute

Condor

General information
- Type: Powered parachute
- National origin: United States
- Manufacturer: Southern Powered Parachutes (formerly called Condor Powered Parachutes)
- Status: Production completed (2006)
- Number built: at least 15

The Southern Condor is an American powered parachute that was designed and produced by Southern Powered Parachutes (formerly called Condor Powered Parachutes) of Nicholson, Georgia. Now out of production, when it was available the aircraft was supplied as a complete ready-to-fly-aircraft.

The company seems to have gone out of business about 2006 and production ended.

== Design and development ==
The Condor complies with the Fédération Aéronautique Internationale microlight category, but was never an accepted US light-sport aircraft.

The Condor features a 540 sq ft (50 m^{2}) parachute-style wing, two-seats-in-tandem accommodation, tricycle landing gear and a single 64 hp (48 kW) Rotax 582 engine in pusher configuration. Twin 50 hp (37 kW) Rotax 503 engines were a factory option.

The aircraft carriage was built from a combination of bolted aluminium and 4130 steel tubing by Aerostar of Romania and then assembled in the US. In flight steering is accomplished via foot pedals that actuate the canopy brakes, creating roll and yaw. On the ground the aircraft has lever-controlled nosewheel steering. The main landing gear incorporates spring rod suspension.

== Operational history ==
In June 2015, 13 examples were registered in the United States with the Federal Aviation Administration, although a total of 15 had been registered at one time.

== Specifications (Condor S Sport) ==
Data from Bertrand and manufacturer

General characteristics

- Crew: one
- Capacity: one passenger
- Length: 9.8 ft (3.0 m)
- Width: 6 ft 4.5 in (1.943 m)
- Height: 7 ft (2.1 m)
- Wing area: 540 sq ft (50 m^{2})
- Empty weight: 322 lb (146 kg)
- Fuel capacity: 10 U.S. gallons (38 L; 8.3 imp gal)
- Powerplant: 1 × Rotax 582 twin cylinder, two-stroke, liquid-cooled aircraft engine, 64 hp (48 kW)
- Propellers: 4-bladed Ivoprop, composite, ground adjustable
