= Aerostar R40S Festival =

Romanian ultralight aircraft

R40S Festival
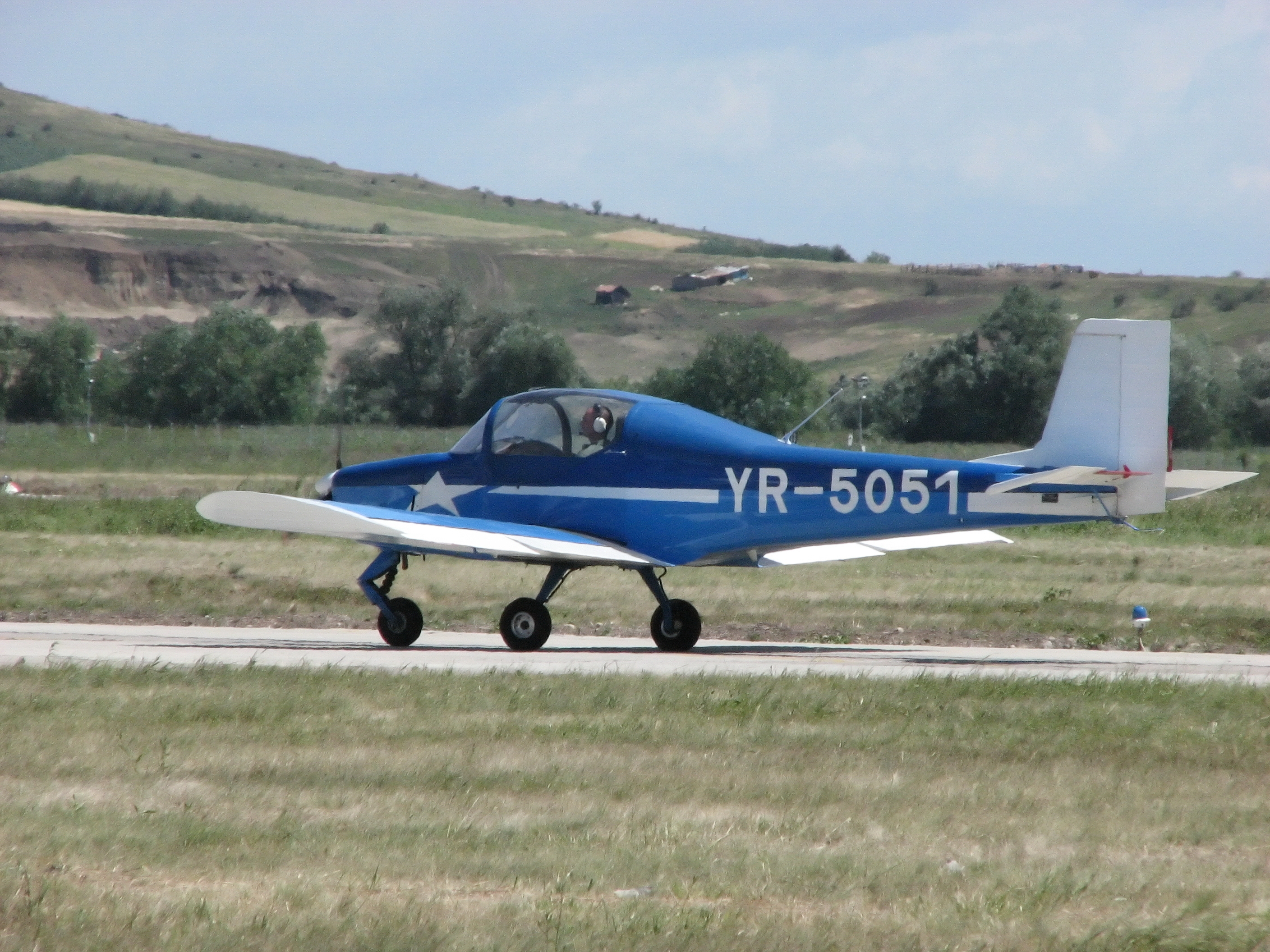

General information
- Type: Ultralight aircraft and Light-sport aircraft
- National origin: Romania
- Manufacturer: Aerostar
- Status: In production

History
- First flight: 31 May 2001

The Aerostar R40S Festival is a Romanian made ultralight and light-sport aircraft, designed and produced by Aerostar of Bacău. The aircraft is supplied as a complete ready-to-fly-aircraft.

== Design and development ==
The aircraft was designed to comply with the Fédération Aéronautique Internationale microlight, and US light-sport aircraft rules. It features a cantilever low-wing, a two-seats-in-side-by-side configuration enclosed cockpit, fixed tricycle landing gear and a single engine in tractor configuration.

The aircraft is made from aluminium sheet. Its 9.17 m (30.1 ft) span wing employs manually operated flaps. The standard engine is the 100 hp (75 kW) Rotax 912ULS four-stroke powerplant, driving a three-bladed Woodcomp propeller.

== Variants ==
R40F
Initial ultralight model
R40FS
Improved model
R40S
Base model with dial instruments
R40S-GC
Version for IFR flight, with a Dynon Skyview glass cockpit

== Operators ==
Mozambique

- Mozambique Air Force

== Specifications (R40F/FS Festival) ==
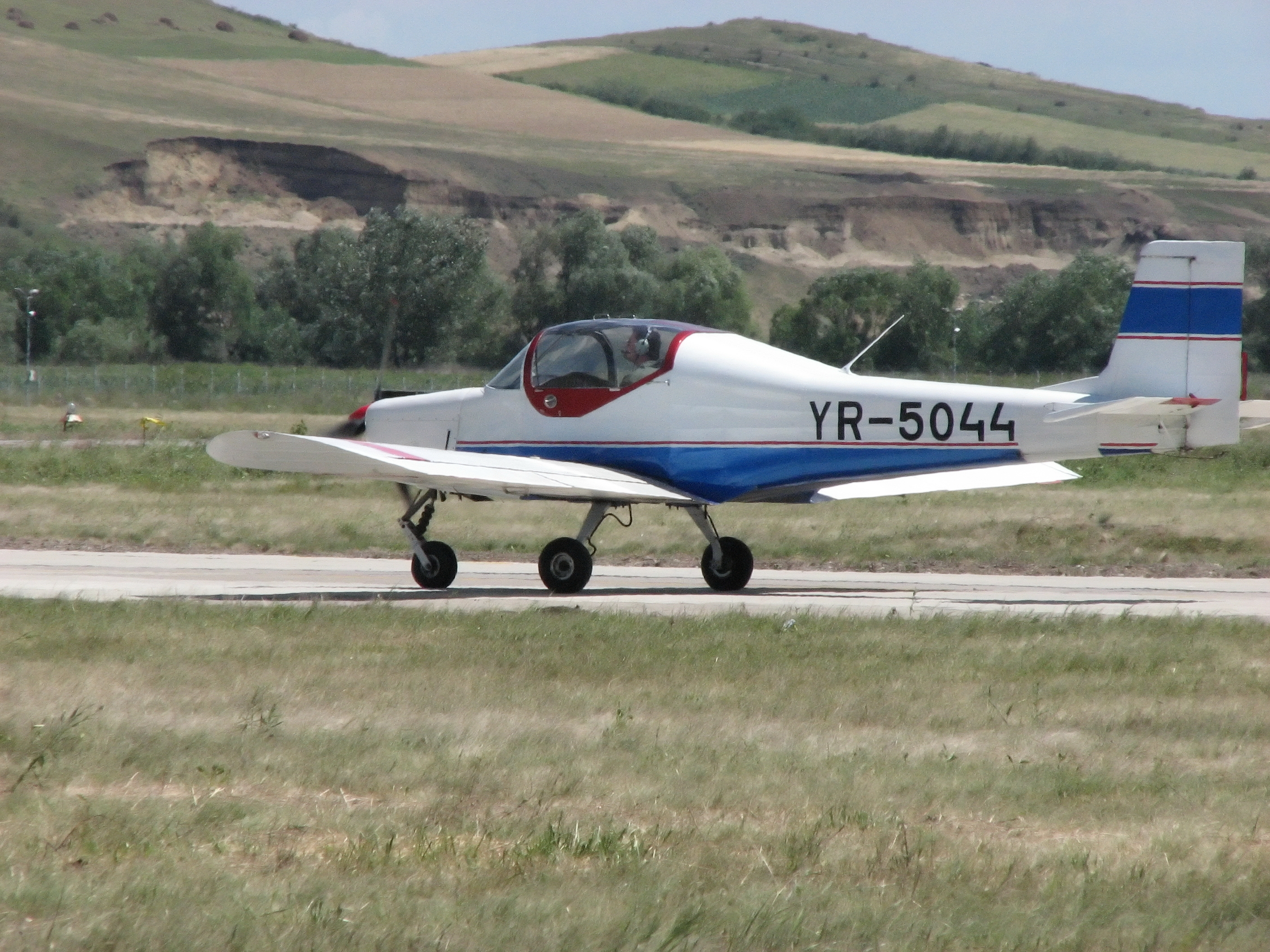
Aerostar R40S Festival

Data from Aerostar operating manual

General characteristics

- Crew: one
- Capacity: one passenger
- Length: 6.74 m (22 ft 1 in)
- Wingspan: 9.17 m (30 ft 1 in)
- Height: 2.47 m (8 ft 1 in)
- Wing area: 13.97 m^{2} (150.4 sq ft)
- Empty weight: 354 kg (780 lb) with Rotax ULS912 engine
- Gross weight: 535 kg (1,179 lb)
- Fuel capacity: 80 litres (18 imp gal; 21 US gal)
- Powerplant: 1 × Rotax 912ULS four cylinder, liquid and air-cooled, four stroke, 75 kW (101 hp)
- Propellers: 3-bladed Klassic 170/3/R, 1.7 m (5 ft 7 in) diameter

Performance

- Maximum speed: 175 km/h (109 mph, 95 kn) V(A)
- Cruise speed: 150 km/h (94 mph, 82 kn)
- Stall speed: 67 km/h (42 mph, 36 kn) flaps at 30 degrees
- Never exceed speed: 215 km/h (134 mph, 116 kn)
- Range: 800 km (500 mi, 430 nmi) with no reserves
- Endurance: 5.8 hours
- Service ceiling: 4,000 m (13,000 ft)
- g limits: +4/-2
- Maximum glide ratio: 12:1
- Rate of climb: 4.35 m/s (856 ft/min)
