= Aerostar (Romanian company) =

Romanian aircraft manufacturer

Aerostar S.A.
- Type: Public
- Traded as: BVB: ARS
- Industry: Aerospace, defence
- Founded: 1953
- Headquarters: Bacău, Romania
- Number of locations: 2
- Area served: Worldwide
- Website: www.aerostar.ro

Aerostar S.A. is an aeronautical manufacturing company based in Bacău, Romania.

== History ==
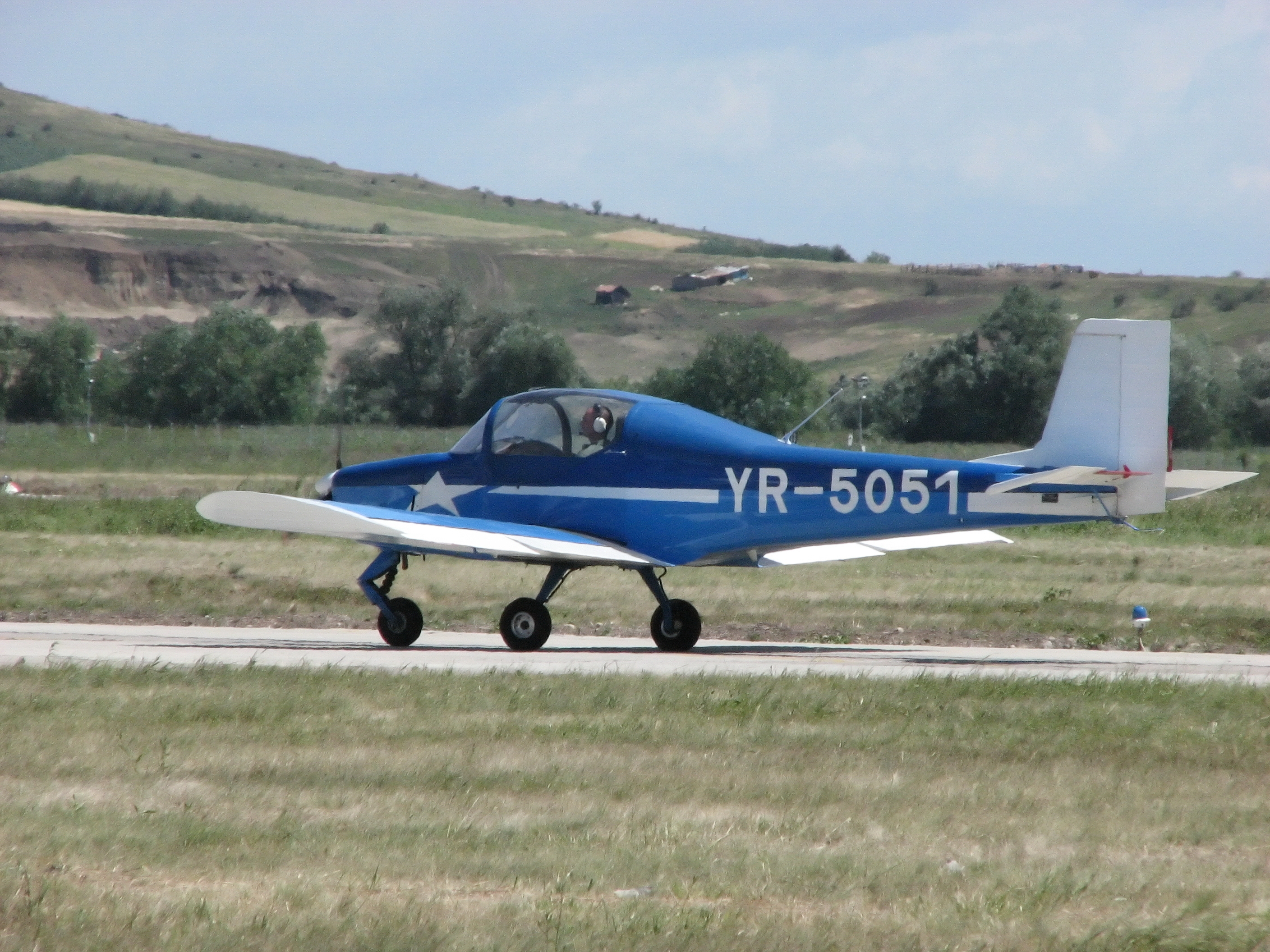
Aerostar Festival

Since its establishment in 1953, the company's name has changed numerous times in turn from U.R.A. to I.R.Av, I.Av. and finally Aerostar. It has been subordinated to the Ministry of Armed Forces and is currently a subsidiary of IAROM, former National Centre of the Romanian Aeronautical industry (CNIAR).

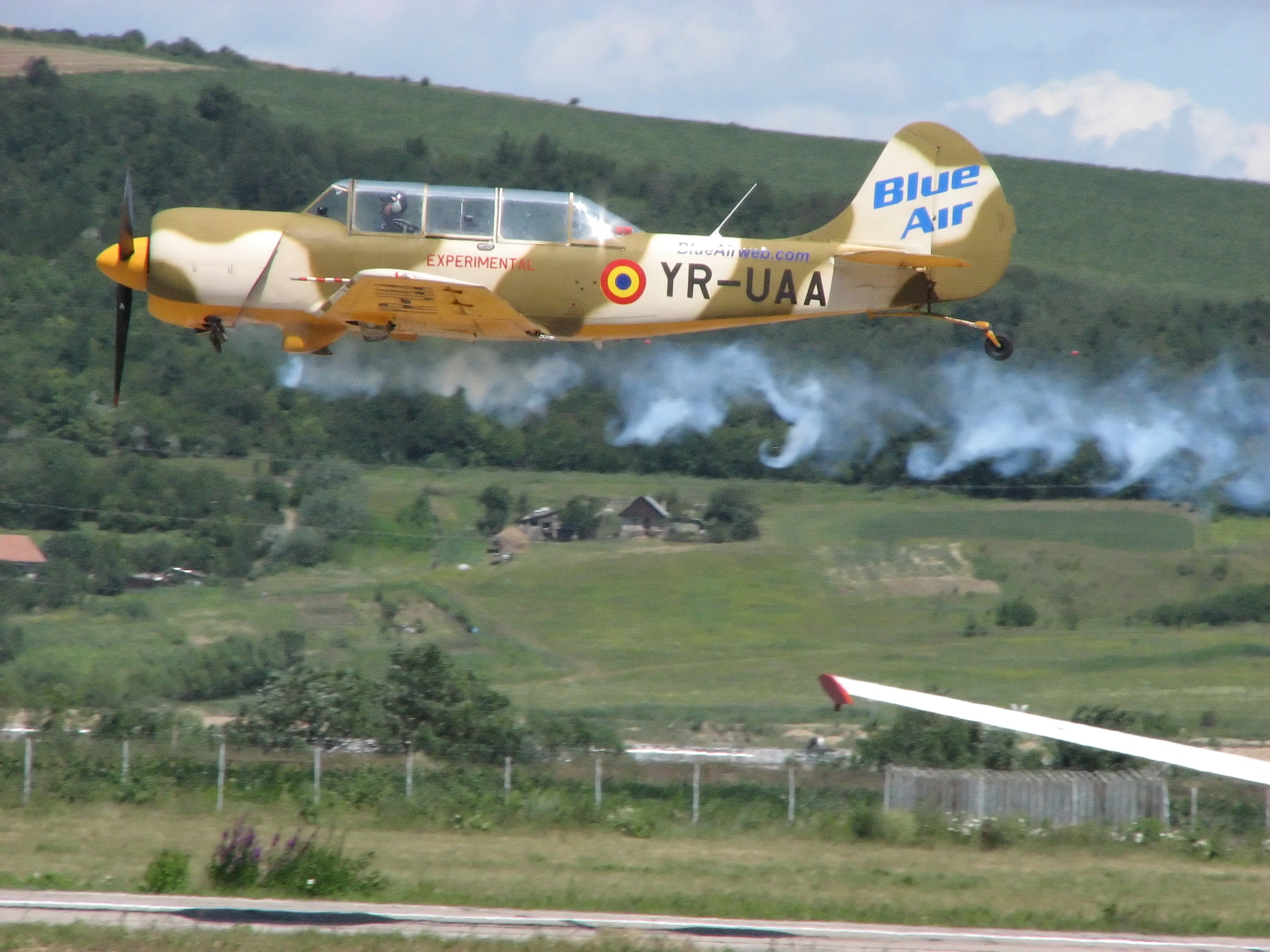
An Aerostar-built Iak-52TW trainer aircraft

Aerostar has been a major provider of maintenance, repair and overhaul (MRO) services for all aircraft types used by the Romanian military. The company also developed the IAR-93 twin-engine, tactical ground-attack and reconnaissance aircraft, which was the first fighter aircraft produced in Romania following the end of the Second World War. Furthermore, the company has also produced more than 1,800 Yak-52 trainer aircraft; it was manufactured in Romania in three versions: the Iak-52, Iak-52W, and Iak-52TW. Aerostar developed its own range of light civil aircraft for aerobatics and sport aviation, such as the Festival light-sport aircraft.

During the 1990s and 2000s, upgrade programs for both the MiG-21 (MiG-21 LanceR) and MiG-29 were developed by Aerostar in cooperation with the Israeli defense electronics specialist Elbit Systems. Aerostar has implemented these upgrades to produce the Romanian Air Force's MiG-21 LanceR fleet from its existing inventory of MiG-21 and MiG-21 bis fighters. The firm has also supplied similarly upgraded MiG-21s to international operators, such as the Mozambique Air Force. However, the MiG-29 SNIPER upgrade never progressed being a technological demonstrator as the service opted to concentrate its limited resources upon the MiG-21 instead. Around the same time, a modernisation program was also carried out on the Iak-52W and Iak-52TW trainers. The firm was also involved in the LAROM modernization program, which upgraded the 40 APRA 122 FMC multiple rocket launchers belonging to the Romanian Army.

During the 1990s and 2000s, the company became engaged in numerous international projects, regularly in partnership with various other aerospace companies, including Elbit Systems, Thales Group (Thomson-CSF), EADS (DaimlerChrysler Aerospace) and Textron Marine & Land Systems. On separate occasions, Aerostar's management has stated that such partnerships are a deliberate element of the company's long-term strategy. One major sector of work for the firm has been the aerostructures sector. Throughout the 2010s, Aerostar has continued to restructure its operations in pursuit of international customers, intending to achieve a decreased level of reliance upon domestic consumers such as the Romanian military.

Starting in the 1990s, the Romanian government launched efforts to privatise many of its state-owned assets, including Aerostar. According to aerospace periodical Flight International, various international companies, including the German aerospace conglomerate DASA, reportedly took an interest in acquiring the company. In February 2000, it was announced that the Romanian government's 69.99 percent stake in the firm would be acquired by a private consortium of Aerostar management and employees (PAS) and IAROM; the nation maintained a golden share to potentially veto decisions that would seriously impact the firm's defense capabilities. That same year, Aerostar was restructured as a limited liability company, reportedly for tax purposes as well as to increase its appeal to potential investors, which were actively sought to fund the firm's expansion plans.

In the mid-2000s, Aerostar was contracted to produce Southern Condor powered parachute airframes for the American company Southern Powered Parachutes, which were sold to consumers in the North American market. During the late 2000s, the company started manufacturing a new line of unmanned aerial vehicles (UAVs) with Israeli assistance; multiple deals were arranged with foreign militaries for Aerostar-built UAVs. In 2011, the firm received work from an agreement between Elbit and the Romanian Air Force to upgrade the latter's fleet of Lockheed Martin C-130 Hercules cargo aircraft.

In recent decades, Aerostar has sought to provide its MRO services to various commercial and international operators; since 2003, the servicing and heavy maintenance of civilian Boeing 737s has been one such undertaking. In 2012, to provide increased capacity for this work, a new hangar was completed at the company's Bacău facility. During May 2015, Russian low-cost airline Utair arranged for its 737 fleet to be serviced by the firm; by this point, upwards of 50 737s per year were receiving C-checks alone at Aerostar's facilities. Similarly, the company has also provided MRO services for operators of the Airbus A320 family.

In September 2020, Aerostar opened a new aircraft maintenance center at the Iași Airport.

Starting in 2021, Aerostar will perform the maintenance service of the Romanian Air Force F-16 fighter aircraft. The "Phase inspection" contract on F-16 number 1603 was awarded to the company on 17 September 2021. In partnership with Lockheed Martin, Aerostar opened the first maintenance centers in Europe for the S-70 Black Hawk helicopters and the M142 HIMARS multiple rocket launchers in 2024.

In 2025, Aerostar in partnership with the National Institute for Aerospace Research (INCAS) announced the IAR 835 project. The IAR 835 is designed as a four-seat, high-wing, single-engine light aircraft with a maximum takeoff weight of 1,200 kg which can be used for flight training, air tourism, cartography and atmospheric research as well as public security and surveillance operations.

== Warbird projects ==
An Aerostar Fw 190 replica

Starting in 1996 the German company Flug Werk GmbH in cooperation with Aerostar Bacău SA began construction of Fw 190 replicas. The first airplane flew in 2004, with a total of 21 aircraft being manufactured and sold as kits.

The group of designers from Aerostar used about 3.5 tons of parts recovered from various wrecks found and reached a total of 8000 drawings. As no original BMW 801 engines were available, Chinese made Dongan Hs-7, license built copy of the Shvetsov ASh-82FN engines, were used. These engines had about 200 hp more than the original BMW engines. The landing gear, engine frame and exhaust system were redesigned, using modern materials.

Three Fw 190 Ds with Allison V-12 engines were also manufactured.

== Products ==
Model name	First flight	Number built	Type
Yakovlev Yak-52	1977	1900+	Two-seat trainer
Aerostar R40S Festival	2001		Two-seat light sport aircraft
Focke-Wulf Fw 190	2004	21	Replica single engine monoplane fighter

== See also ==
- Aviation in Romania
