= Bartlett Zephyr =

LC-13A Zephyr 150
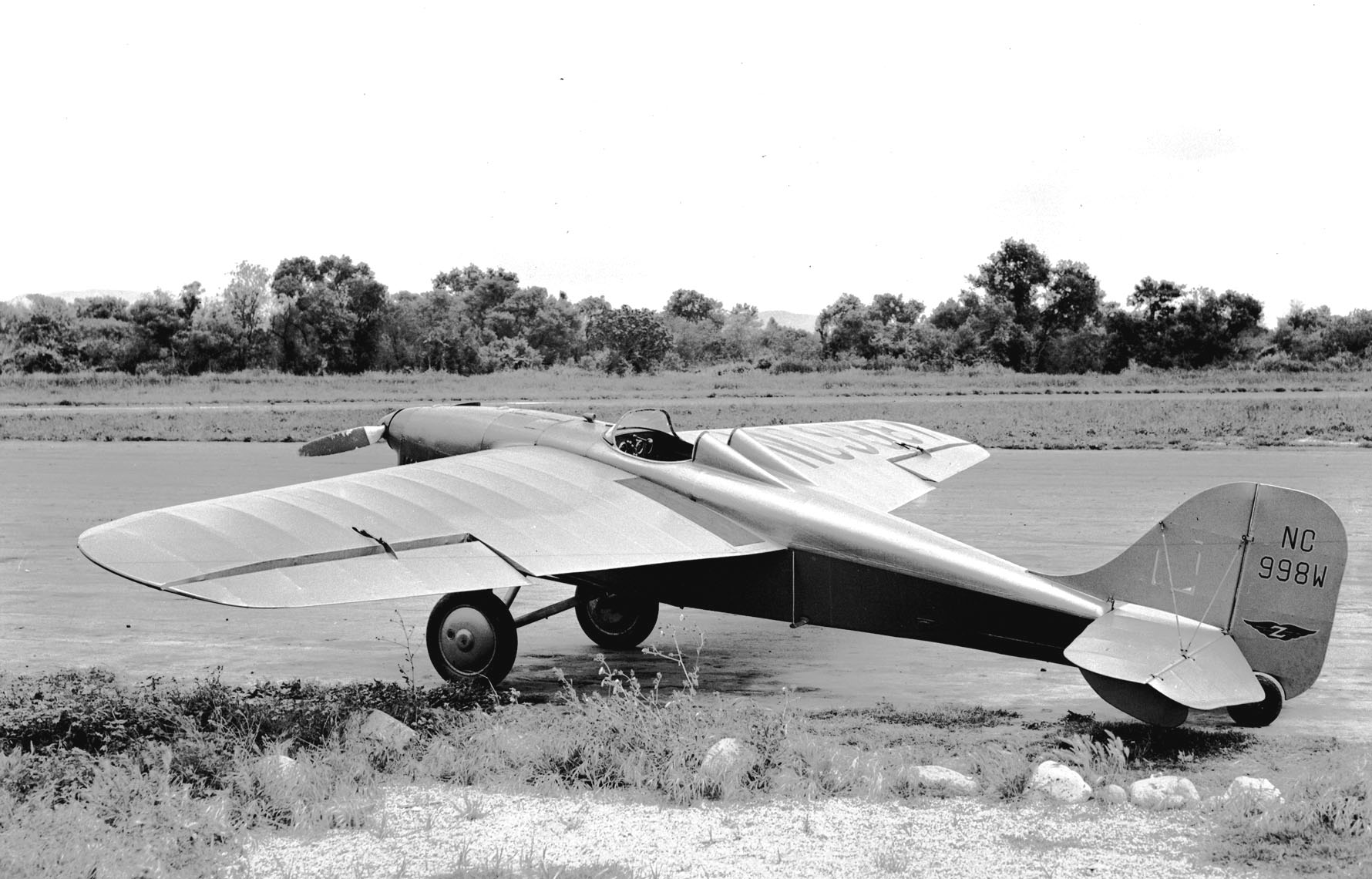

General information
- Manufacturer: Bartlett Aircraft
- Designer: Vearne C. Babcock
- Number built: ca. 4

The Bartlett LC-13A Zephyr 150 was a United States light civil aircraft built in the 1940s. It was a mid-wing braced monoplane of conventional design with side-by-side seating for two and fixed, tailwheel undercarriage. It was originally marketed as the Babcock LC-13 by its original manufacturer, then as the Taubman LC-13 when the Babcock Airplane Corporation was acquired by Taubman Aircraft. The rights were finally acquired by Bartlett Aircraft in 1941, but plans to mass-produce it were halted by the outbreak of World War II. There was a brief attempt to revive the design at the end of the war, but nothing came of this.

== Specifications (LC-13A Zephyr 150) ==
Data from Jane's all the World's Aircraft 1947

General characteristics

- Crew: 2
- Length: 21 ft 0 in (6.4 m)
- Wingspan: 30 ft 8 in (9.34 m)
- Height: 6 ft 0 in (1.83 m)
- Wing area: 132 sq ft (12.3 m^{2})
- Empty weight: 965 lb (438 kg)
- Gross weight: 1,650 lb (748 kg)
- Fuel capacity: 50 US gal (42 imp gal; 190 L)
- Powerplant: 1 × Franklin 6A4-150-B3 6-cyl horizontally-opposed air-cooled piston engine, 150 hp (110 kW) at 2,600 rpm
- Propellers: 2-bladed constant-speed propeller

Performance

- Maximum speed: 150 mph (240 km/h, 130 kn)
- Cruise speed: 135 mph (217 km/h, 117 kn) * Landing speed: 42 mph (36 kn; 68 km/h)
- Stall speed: 35 mph (56 km/h, 30 kn)
- Range: 500 mi (800 km, 430 nmi)
- Service ceiling: 18,000 ft (5,500 m)
- Rate of climb: 1,500 ft/min (7.6 m/s)
- Wing loading: 2.6 lb/sq ft (12.5 kg/m^{2})
- Fuel consumption: 0.4 lb/mi (0.11 kg/km)
- Power/mass: 11 lb/hp (6.68 kg/kW)

== See also ==
- California during World War II
