= List of aircraft manufacturers =

This is a list of aircraft manufacturers sorted alphabetically by International Civil Aviation Organization (ICAO)/common name. It contains the ICAO/common name, manufacturers name(s), country and other data, with the known years of operation in parentheses. The ICAO names are listed in bold. Having an ICAO name does not mean that a manufacturer is still in operation today, just that some of the aircraft produced by that manufacturer are still flying.

- List of aircraft manufacturers (A)
- List of aircraft manufacturers (B–C)
- List of aircraft manufacturers (D–G)
- List of aircraft manufacturers (H–L)
- List of aircraft manufacturers (M–P)
- List of aircraft manufacturers (Q–S)
- List of aircraft manufacturers (T–Z)

== See also ==
- List of aircraft
- List of aircraft by date and usage category
- List of aircraft manufacturers by ICAO name
- List of civil aircraft
- List of jet aircraft of World War II
- List of rotorcraft manufacturers by country
- Lists of military aircraft by nation
