= Lisunov =

Lisunov (Russian: Лисунов) is a Russian masculine surname, its feminine counterpart is Lisunova. It may refer to

- Boris Lisunov (1898–1946), Soviet aerospace engineer
- Ekaterina Lisunova (born 1989), Russian water polo player, wife of Sergey
- Sergey Lisunov (born 1986), Russian water polo player, husband of Ekaterina
- Vladimir Lisunov (1940–2000), Russian nonconformist artist
- Lisunov Li-2 Soviet plane
