= Southern Powered Parachutes =

American aircraft manufacturer

- Type: Privately held company
- Industry: Aerospace
- Founded: circa 2001
- Founder: John Massey
- Defunct: 2006
- Fate: Out of business
- Headquarters: Nicholson, Georgia, United States
- Products: Powered parachutes

Southern Powered Parachutes was an American aircraft manufacturer based in Nicholson, Georgia. The company specialized in the design and manufacture of powered parachutes in the form of ready-to-fly aircraft for the European Fédération Aéronautique Internationale microlight and the US FAR 103 Ultralight Vehicles trainer rules. The company's designs were never listed in the American light-sport aircraft category.

The company was founded as Condor Powered Parachutes by John Massey in about 2001 as a result of his experience as a powered parachute pilot and dealer for other brands. He wanted to produce a lower-cost aircraft and Massey had a chance meeting with the president of Aerostar that led to a manufacturing relationship. As the model line expanded the company changed its name to Southern Powered Parachutes.

Southern produced two models, the Condor and Raptor, with the airframes built by Aerostar in Romania. The airframes were shipped to the US and assembled in Georgia for domestic sale. At least 15 Condors and eight Raptors were built. The company seems to have gone out of business in about 2006.

== Aircraft ==
Summary of aircraft built by Southern Powered Parachutes
Model name	First flight	Number built	Type
Southern Condor	2001	at least 15	Two seat powered parachute
Southern Raptor	2004	at least 8	Two seat powered parachute
