= Bartlett Aircraft =

American aircraft manufacturer

Bartlett Aircraft Corp. was a US aircraft manufacturer founded in Rosemead, California in 1941 to build light aircraft from designs acquired from the purchase of Taubman Aircraft, who in turn bought them from Babcock Airplane Corporation.

World War II interrupted plans for mass production and although another attempt to resume production was made at the end of hostilities, nothing came of this.

== Aircraft ==
- Bartlett Zephyr
