= Layzell Cricket =

Single-seat autogyro

Cricket
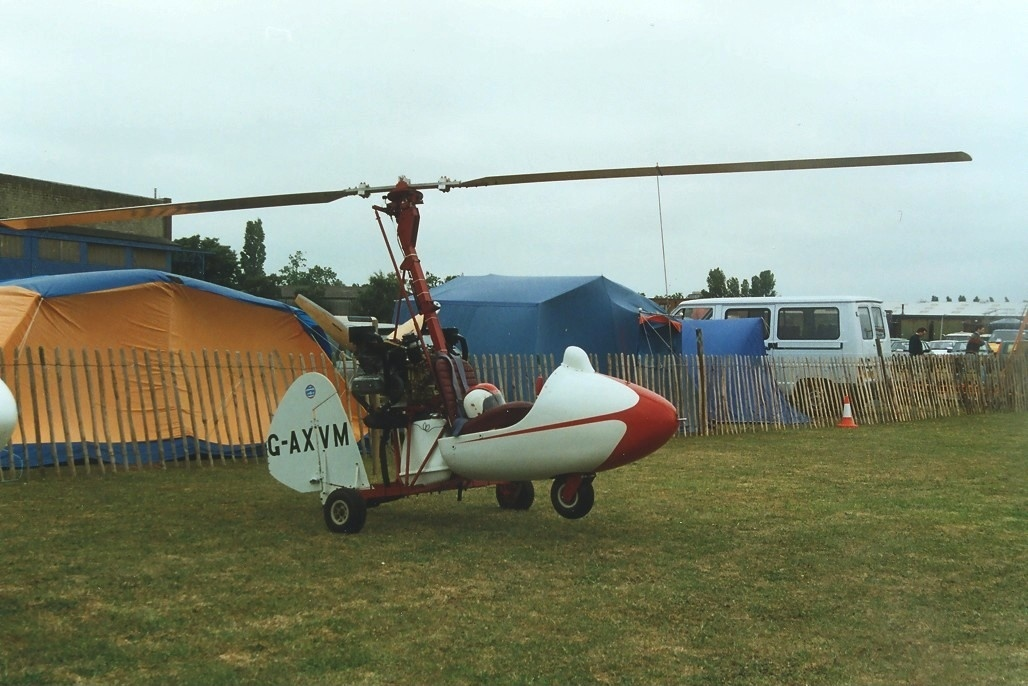
- Campbell Cricket G-AXVM

General information
- Type: Recreational autogyro
- Manufacturer: Campbell Aircraft; Cricket Gyroplanes; Layzell Gyroplanes
- Designer: Peter Lovegrove
- Number built: 43

History
- First flight: November 1969

The Layzell Cricket is a single-seat autogyro produced in the United Kingdom. It was originally built by Campbell Aircraft as the Campbell Cricket, first flying in 1969.

== Development and design ==
In 1959, Campbell Aircraft acquired a licence to build Bensen Aircraft autogyros, and exclusive rights to sell Bensen designs in the UK. It flew its first aircraft in August 1960, and produced progressively improved versions of the Bensen autogyro from a factory in Hungerford, Berkshire, before moving to Membury airfield in 1967.

In 1969, the autogyro enthusiast Peter Lovegrove designed a new autogyro, the Campbell Cricket, to avoid problems with existing autogyros such as the Bensen. The Cricket was powered by a 75 hp (56 kW) modified 1600 cc Volkswagen air-cooled engine instead of the two-stroke engines used by the Bensens in order to improve reliability. It was a single-seat autogyro, with a steel tube fuselage structure, covered by a glassfibre nacelle. The pilot sat in an open cockpit. The autogyro had a two-bladed metal rotor, which could be fitted with an optional mechanical drive from the engine to pre-spin the rotor prior to take-off. The four-cylinder engine was mounted behind the pilot and drove a two-bladed fixed pitch pusher propeller. A fixed tricycle landing gear was fitted, while tail surfaces consisted of a single fin and rudder mounted on a tailboom.

In June 1969 parts of the new design were flight tested on a Bensen B-8. This was followed by the full prototype, aircraft registration G-AXNU, which made its first flight on 7 August 1969. Production started later that year, reaching a rate of two per week by 1970. Forty-seven Crickets were built by Campbell Aircraft by April 1972. (Note: Other sources (e.g. The Helicopter Museum), state that Campbell built 33 Crickets.)

In February 1984, R. J. Everett Engineering of Sproughton, Suffolk flew the first example of the Everett Autogyro, a derivative of the Cricket powered by a 1600 cc or 1830 cc Volkswagen engine. Everett started work on construction of an initial batch of 25 Everett Autogyros, of which 16 had been sold by 1987. In 1996, Lovegrove designed an updated version of the Cricket, the Cricket Mk 4, powered by a Rotax engine and meeting the current safety requirements of the Popular Flying Association. Plans for the Cricket Mk 4 were sold by British Gyroplanes of Wallingford. In 2000, Lovegrove built a single Cricket Mk 5, fitted with a horizontal stabilizer.

In 2003, the first prototype of the Layzell AV-18, registration G-CBWN, (also known as the Cricket Mk 6A), designed to be built from kits, was built, with a Permit to Fly being granted in March 2005. A second example was reported to be under construction in 2007. The type remained for sale in 2011, although by July 2012 the company website had been removed from the internet.

== Specifications (Mk.6) ==
Data from Taylor and Bayerl

General characteristics

- Crew: one
- Length: 10 ft 6 in (3.20 m)
- Empty weight: 310 lb (141 kg)
- Gross weight: 650 lb (295 kg)
- Fuel capacity: 36 litres (7.9 imp gal; 9.5 US gal)
- Powerplant: 1 × Rotax 582 twin cylinder two stroke, liquid-cooled, aircraft engine, 64 hp (48 kW)
- Main rotor diameter: 22 ft 0 in (6.71 m)
- Main rotor area: 380 sq ft (35 m^{2})
- Propellers: 3-bladed composite

Performance

- Maximum speed: 63 mph (102 km/h, 55 kn)
- Cruise speed: 52 mph (83 km/h, 45 kn)
- Rate of climb: 650 ft/min (3.3 m/s)
- Disk loading: 1.71 lb/sq ft (8.3 kg/m^{2})
