= Belairbus =

Belgian aerospace manufacturer

- Type: Consortium
- Industry: Aerospace
- Founded: 1979
- Products: Commercial airliner components
- Website: www.belairbus.be

Belairbus is a Belgian aerospace manufacturer. It is a consortium established to allow a number of Belgian companies to participate in the manufacturing of Airbus aircraft while fulfilling Airbus' stipulation that it only deal with one entity in each European country that wants to be a part of the Airbus manufacturing program. It is an associated partner of Airbus, manufacturing parts for the Airbus A320 family, the Airbus A340 and the Airbus A380.

== History ==
Belairbus was formed in 1979 as a consortium of the Belgian government; the development authority of Wallonia; and the companies SONACA (formerly Avions Fairey), Fabrique Nationale and Asco. The consortium was established to participate in manufacturing the Airbus A310, being responsible for A310 wing leading edge slats, slat tracks and Krueger flaps. Airbus called Belairbus an "associate", along with Fokker, as both companies were involved with manufacturing Airbus aircraft without being shareholders in Airbus.

The consortium partners are now Sonaca, Asco Industries and Eurair, a subsidiary of Watteeuw Group. Belairbus subcontracts manufacturing to these three consortium members. Each consortium member's share in Belairbus is in proportion to the value of its production for the consortium; Sonaca's share is approximately 58%, Asco's 35%, and Eurair's 7%, with a single share also held by Belgian aerospace company SABCA.
