= Layzell Merlin =

British gyroplane

Merlin

General information
- Type: Autogyro
- National origin: United Kingdom
- Manufacturer: Layzell Gyroplanes
- Designer: Jim Montgomery
- Status: Production completed (2011)

The Layzell Merlin is a British autogyro that was designed by Scottish designer Jim Montgomery and produced by Layzell Gyroplanes of Quedgeley, Gloucester. The aircraft was supplied as a kit for amateur construction.

The type remained in production by Layzell through 2011, although by July 2012 the company website had been removed from the internet.

== Design and development ==
The Merlin features a single main rotor, a single-seat open cockpit with a fairing and a windshield, tricycle landing gear with wheel pants and a twin cylinder, air-cooled, two-stroke, single-ignition 64 hp (48 kW) Rotax 582 engine in pusher configuration.

The aircraft fuselage is made from bolted-together square aluminum tubing. Its 7.01 m (23.0 ft) diameter Rotor Flight Dynamics rotor has a chord of 18 cm (7.1 in). The aircraft has an empty weight of 145 kg (320 lb) and a gross weight of 295 kg (650 lb), giving a useful load of 150 kg (331 lb).

After taking over Montgomery's design, company owner Gary Layzell expressed an interest in further developing the Merlin, but initially produced it unchanged.

== Operational history ==
By January 2013, 28 examples had been registered in the United Kingdom with the CAA as Montgomerie-Bensen B8MR.

== Specifications (Merlin GTS) ==
Data from Bayerl

General characteristics

- Crew: one
- Empty weight: 145 kg (320 lb)
- Gross weight: 295 kg (650 lb)
- Fuel capacity: 50 litres (11 imp gal; 13 US gal)
- Powerplant: 1 × Rotax 582 twin cylinder, liquid-cooled, two stroke aircraft engine, 48 kW (64 hp)
- Main rotor diameter: 7.01 m (23 ft 0 in)
- Propellers: 3-bladed composite

Performance

- Cruise speed: 120 km/h (75 mph, 65 kn)
- Rate of climb: 4.5 m/s (890 ft/min)
