= Fajr Aviation & Composites Industry =

Iranian aircraft manufacturer

- Founded: 1991
- Headquarters: Tehran, Iran
- Area served: Iran
- Products: Composite structures for defense, aerospace, and commercial uses
- Website: http://www.tco.ac.ir/fajr/

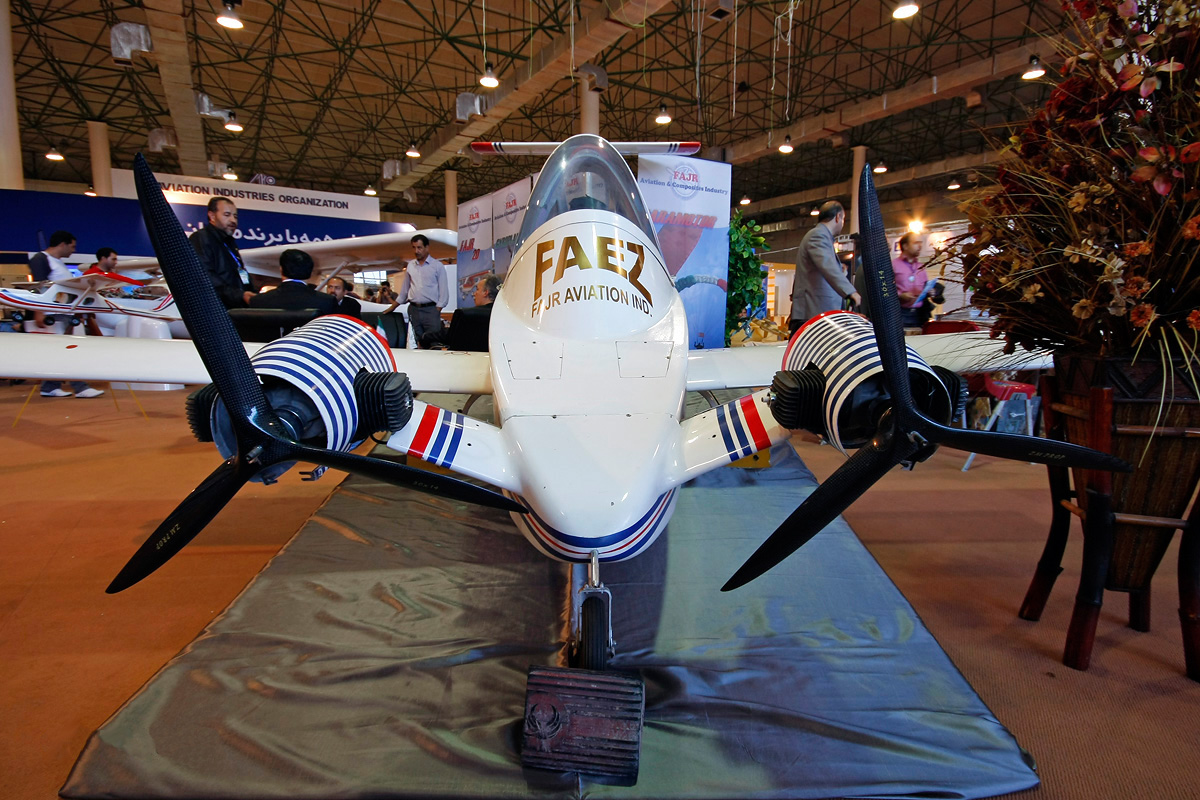
Faez in Kish Air Show 2009

Fajr Aviation & Composites Industry (FACI) was established 1991 by Raht-Aseman. FACI's first design, the Fajr F.3, entered production in 2001 and made its public debut in October 2002. Production was continuing in 2006, now of the improved Fajr F.3B.

In 2010, Fajr unveiled a one-an twin-engine airplane dubbed "Faez." According to released data, it has an empty weight of 78 kilograms and a gross weight of 175 kilograms, and is intended for reconnaissance, medical supplies, and small packages.

== Design and manufacturing ==
- Manufacturing Fajr F.3 training aircraft
- Wind tunnel vanes
- Hovercraft
- Full composite boat
- Automobile bumper
- Aerodynamic fairing of helicopter
- Radar and communication dishes

== See also ==
- Iran Aviation Industries Organization
