= Chakavak (plane) =

Iranian-made light plane

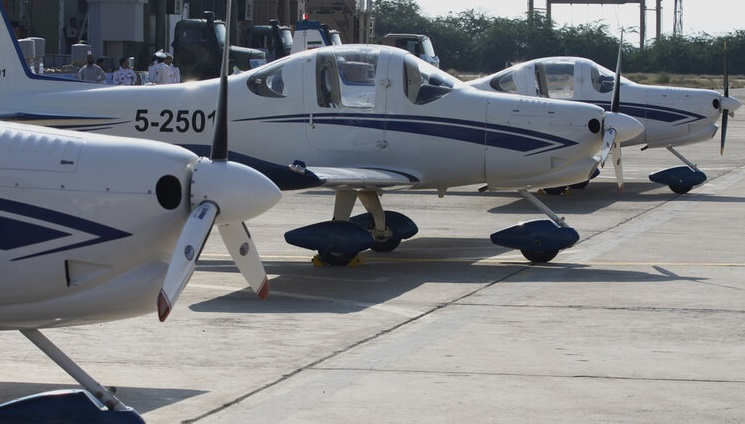
- Attachment of 3 Chakavk aircraft to the "Army Navy"

General information
- Type: Ultralight training-reconnaissance planes
- Manufacturer: Iran
- Designer: An Iranian Knowledge Base Company
- Status: Active service, Islamic Republic of Iran
- Primary users: Iran (Islamic Republic of Iran Navy Aviation)

History
- Introduction date: 2019

The Chakavak (ultralight training-reconnaissance plane) (Persian: هواپیمای آموزشی-شناسایی چکاوک) is an Iranian ultralight training-reconnaissance plane which is able to fly at an altitude of 14000 feet above sea-level for approximately four and a half hours with a speed of 280 kilometers (per hour). Chakavak aircraft possesses 2 seats and an engine. The aircraft weighs 500 kg during flight and 750 kg during takeoff.

This plane was designed by a domestic knowledge-based company, and was joined the Iranian Navy's aviation fleet in the southern port city of Bandar Abbas, in Hormozgan province on December 03, 2019. Three of these domestically-manufactured training-reconnaissance planes were delivered to the Iranian Navy's aviation fleet on the mentioned day in 2019.
