= Layzell Gyroplanes =

British gyroplane manufacturer

Layzell Gyroplanes Ltd
- Company type: Privately held company
- Industry: Aerospace
- Fate: Out of business before July 2012
- Headquarters: Quedgeley, Gloucester, United Kingdom
- Key people: Gary Layzell
- Products: Autogyros
- Website: www.gyrokits.com

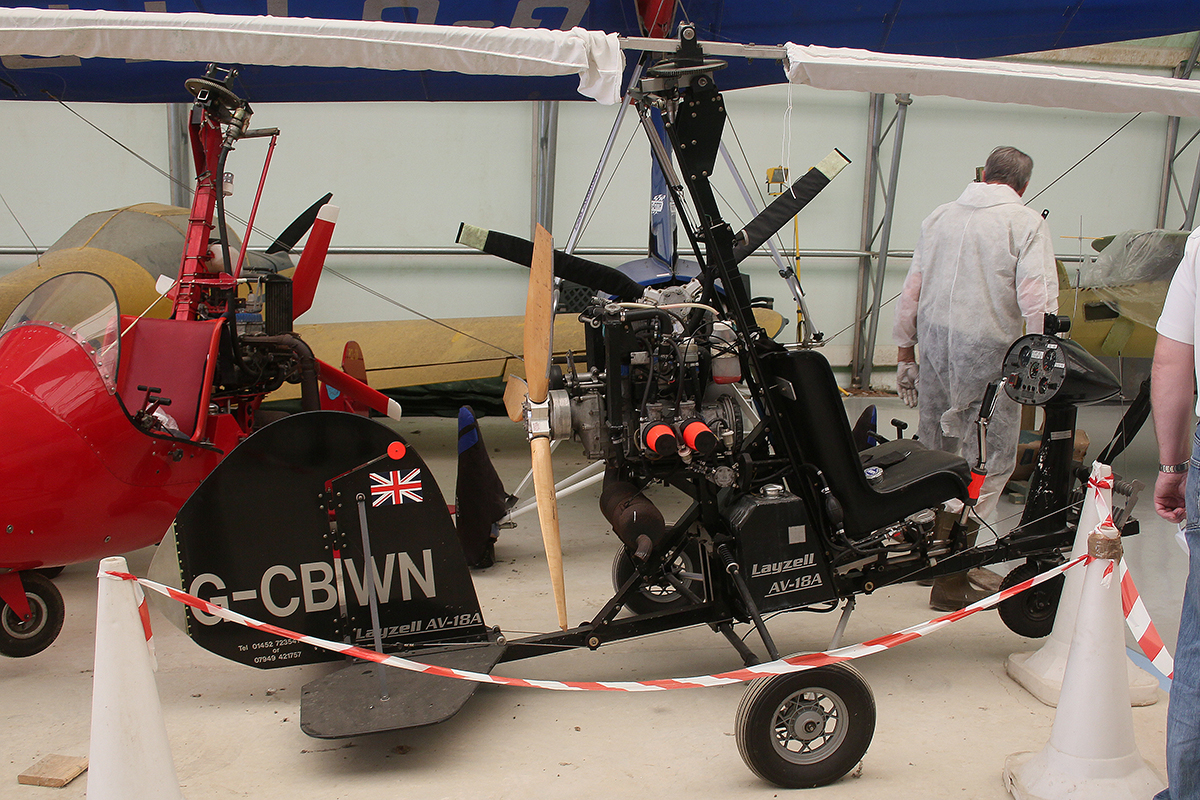
Layzell Cricket

Layzell Gyroplanes Ltd was a British aircraft manufacturer based in Quedgeley, Gloucester and founded by Gary Layzell. The company specialized in the manufacture of autogyros in the form of kits for amateur construction.

During its time in business Layzell produced two designs, the Layzell Cricket designed by Peter Lovegrove, produced by Layzell from 2005, and the Layzell Merlin from Scottish designer Jim Montgomery.

Layzell remained in business through 2011, although by July 2012 the company website had been removed from the internet.

== Aircraft ==
Summary of aircraft built by Layzell Gyroplanes
Model name	First flight	Number built	Type
Layzell Merlin			Single seat, open cockpit autogyro
Layzell Cricket	November 1969		Single seat, open cockpit autogyro, produced by Layzell from 2005
