= H&E Paramotores =

Spanish aircraft manufacturer

H&E Paramotores S.L.
- Type: Privately held company
- Industry: Aerospace
- Founded: 1999
- Headquarters: Madrid, Spain
- Products: Paramotors
- Website: he-paramotores.com

H&E Paramotores S.L., variously referred to as HE Paramotores, Paramotores H.E and H.E Paramotores, is a Spanish aircraft manufacturer based in Madrid. The company specializes in the design and manufacture of paramotors in the form of ready-to-fly aircraft for the US FAR 103 Ultralight Vehicles rules and the European Fédération Aéronautique Internationale microlight category.

The company was founded in 1999 and has a 350 m^{2} (3,800 sq ft) manufacturing facility equipped with modern CNC machinery.

The company is a Sociedad de Responsabilidad Limitada, a form of Spanish limited liability company.

== Products ==
=== Paramotors ===
Initially the company produced paramotor models with imported engines, including the now-discontinued H&E Paramotores Corsario, Solo, Simonini and the Ziklon. Newer paramotors include the H&E Paramotores R90NG, R125NG and the Airmax. The company also offers a trike package to adapt its paramotors for wheeled takeoffs and landings.

=== Engines ===
After starting production of paramotors with engines from other manufacturers, such as the Solo 210 engine, Cors'Air, Simonini Racing engines and the Per Il Volo Top 80, the company embarked on the development of its own line of engines. These now include the H&E Paramotores R90, R125 and the Airmax 220cc.

== Aircraft ==
Summary of aircraft built by H&E Paramotores
Model name	First flight	Number built	Type
H&E Paramotores Corsario	mid-2000s		paramotor
H&E Paramotores Solo	mid-2000s		paramotor
H&E Paramotores Simonini	mid-2000s		paramotor
H&E Paramotores Ziklon	mid-2000s		paramotor
H&E Paramotores R90NG	2010s		paramotor
H&E Paramotores R125NG	2010s		paramotor
H&E Paramotores Airmax	2010s		paramotor
