= Babcock Airplane Corporation =

American aviation company

Coordinates: 29.032°N 81.294°W

- Industry: Aerospace
- Founded: 12 May 1939
- Defunct: 1945
- Headquarters: United States

The Babcock Airplane Corporation was a short-lived aviation company from 1939 to 1945, located in DeLand, Florida.

== History ==
"The Babcock Aircraft corporation was incorporated May 12, 1939, under laws of the state of Florida with an authorized capitalization of $150,000. It is wholly a Florida company, according to Maj. [Fred L.] Foster, owned and operated by Florida people." Foster was president while Vearne C. Babcock was vice-president and chief engineer.

The Daytona Beach Morning Journal reported on 11 June 1940 that DeLand Mayor A. C. Hatch cut the ribbon attached to fuselage machinery signifying the start of production at the new facility on 10 June. The factory was described as composed of three rooms, one for painting, one for welding fuselage structures, and one for attaching fabric. President Fred L. Foster stated that plans and specifications had been on file in Washington since 7 April.

"Interviewed on the opening of production at the DeLand factory this afternoon, Major Foster said that the corporation has been turning down plane orders pending word from the government on a number of training ships it would require from the local source. He also revealed Babcock officials had been approached by the allied purchasing officials and that a 10-acre factory site adjoining the DeLand airport is under option by the corporation if and when the government orders begin pouring in. The corporation has turned down orders from several schools for training ships."

The plant could produce three aircraft a day at this time, with all fabrication except for motors done on location. Wings were removed for transport to the local airport where flight tests were conducted. Powerplants were shipped from Van Nuys, California.

The Okaloosa News-Journal, Crestview, Florida, reported on 19 July 1940, that "The Babcock Airplane Corporation recently purchased all assets of the Rover Aircraft Motors of Dayton, Ohio, and plans to begin the production of airplane motors at its new plant (at Deland, Florida) [sic] by Aug. 15, officials announced last week.

"The recent purchase included all engineering data, master drawings, tools, machinery, and a large stock of unfinished engines of the Rover organization, the total value of stock and material included in the deal being $185,000 was announced by President Fred L. Foster of the Babcock Airplane Corporation."

Vearne Babcock organized the DeLand Pool by 1942, a complex of small manufacturing and fabricating shops in Central Florida. Babcock Aircraft's first contract was for assembly stands on which airplane motors could be assembled. The plans called for worm gears and drives that Babcock could not produce. They turned the contract over to the LaRoe Machine Shop of Eustis, Florida, part of the pool. The LaRoe Family Home Historic District is now on the National Register of Historic Places.

During World War II, Babcock constructed 60 Waco CG-4 gliders as CG-4A-BBs, in two batches.

The company "was out of production by 1945. Unit cost of these CG-4A was $51,000. Their manufacturing facility was a circus tent," states one source.
