= Escapade Kid =

Kid

General information
- Type: Single-seat ultralight homebuilt or complete
- National origin: United Kingdom
- Manufacturer: Escapade Aircraft Ltd

History
- Developed from: Flying K Sky Raider
- Variant: Lanitz Escapade One

The Escapade Kid is a single-engine, single-seat, high-wing monoplane, developed and built in the United Kingdom in the 2000s.

== Design and development ==
Despite its name, the Kid is not a direct development of the Reality Escapade but seems to be a derivative of the Flying K Sky Raider, the predecessor of the Reality Sky Raider. Escapade took over the Kid in 2008 from Reality, whose address they share.

The Kid has a welded steel frame structure, fabric covered. Its high wings have constant chord and are built around two spars, one of which also forms the wing leading edge. The wing carries balanced ailerons and flaps; they fold back for transport, remaining horizontal. Each wing is braced by a V-form pair of struts, assisted by jury strutting.

The fuselage is flat sided with a narrow dorsal ridge sloping upwards from the tail to the wing trailing edge. The single seat cabin is below the wing, its windows full-chord and the screen just forward of the leading edge. Access is via a hinged transparency and shallow hinged fuselage panel. The Kid usually has an 18 kW (24 hp) Hirth F33 single cylinder two-stroke engine, though the 30 kW (40 hp) Aero 40 Wankel engine is an alternative. The Kid has its tailplane mounted on top of the fuselage, braced with V-struts from below and wire-braced to the fin above. The fin and rudder are broad chord and rounded. The starboard elevator has a trim tab. The undercarriage is fixed and conventional, with brakeable mainwheels on faired-in V-struts hinged to the lower fuselage longerons, with bungee-sprung half axles mounted on a central compression frame. There is a solid tailwheel.

== Operational history ==
The Kid made its first public appearance in November 2008 at the Sport and Leisure Aviation Show held in Birmingham, UK. It is available either as a kit for home building or in ready to fly form. With an empty weight of 115 kg (340 lb) and a wing loading just less than the 10 kg/m^{2} (2.05 lb/ft^{2}), the Kid qualifies in the UK as a single seat deregulated (SSDR) microlight, so does not require a Certificate of Airworthiness or a Permit to Fly. In spring 2012 there were three Kids on the UK civil aircraft register.

== Specifications ==
Data from Jane's All the World's Aircraft 2011/12

General characteristics

- Crew: 1
- Length: 16 ft 2 in (4.93 m)
- Wingspan: 29 ft 4 in (8.94 m)
- Wing area: 124.0 sq ft (11.52 m^{2})
- Empty weight: 254 lb (115 kg)
- Gross weight: 518 lb (235 kg)
- Fuel capacity: 20 L (5.03 US gal, 4.4 Imp gal)
- Powerplant: 1 × Hirth F-33 single cylinder two-stroke engine, 24.3 hp (18.1 kW)
- Propellers: 2-bladed Powerfin, ground adjustable pitch

Performance

- Cruise speed: 63 mph (102 km/h, 55 kn)
- Stall speed: 34 mph (54 km/h, 29 kn)
- Never exceed speed: 100 mph (161 km/h, 87 kn)
- Take-off and landing run: 50 m (165 ft)
