= Just Superstol =

American homebuilt aircraft

SuperSTOL
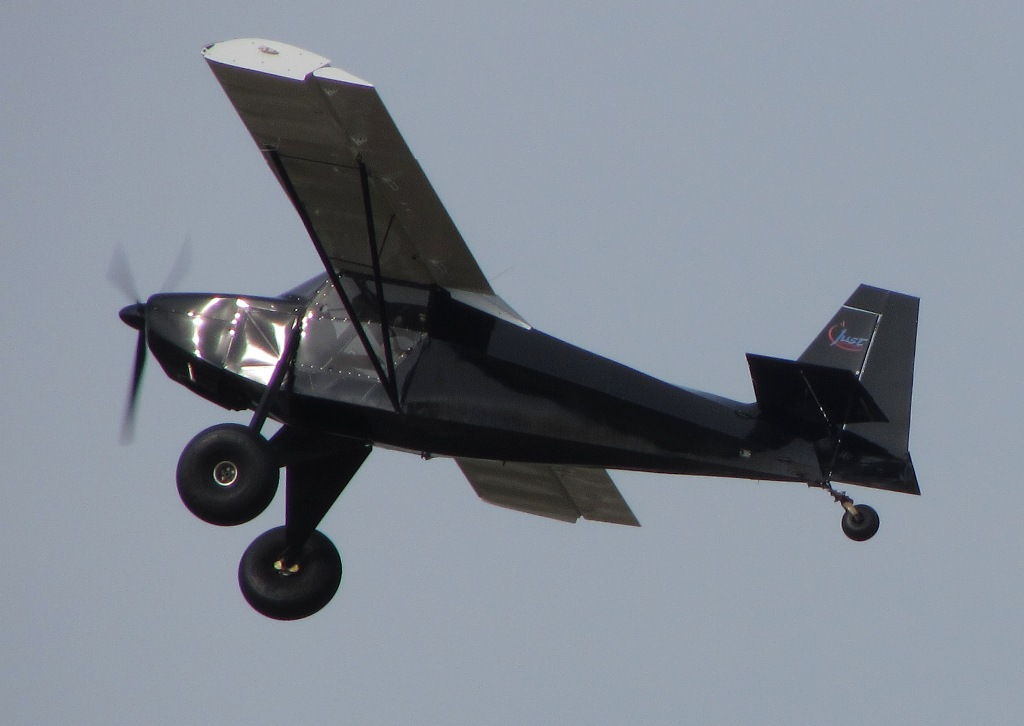
- SuperSTOL prototype at AirVenture 2012

General information
- Type: Homebuilt aircraft
- National origin: United States
- Manufacturer: Just Aircraft
- Status: In production (2019)

History
- Introduction date: 2012
- Developed from: Just Highlander

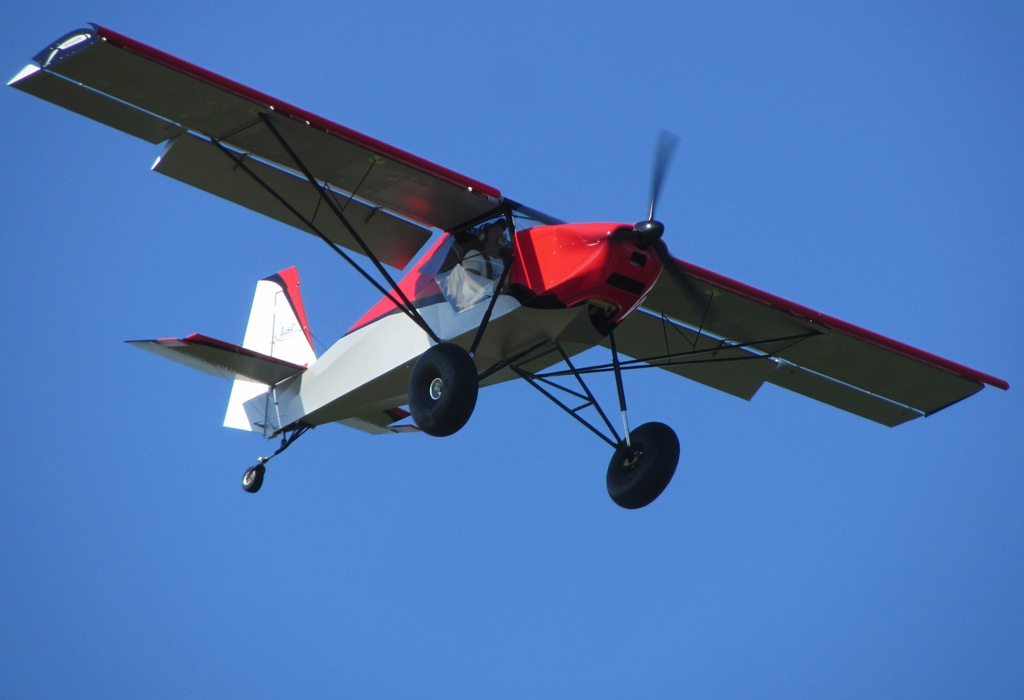
SuperSTOL

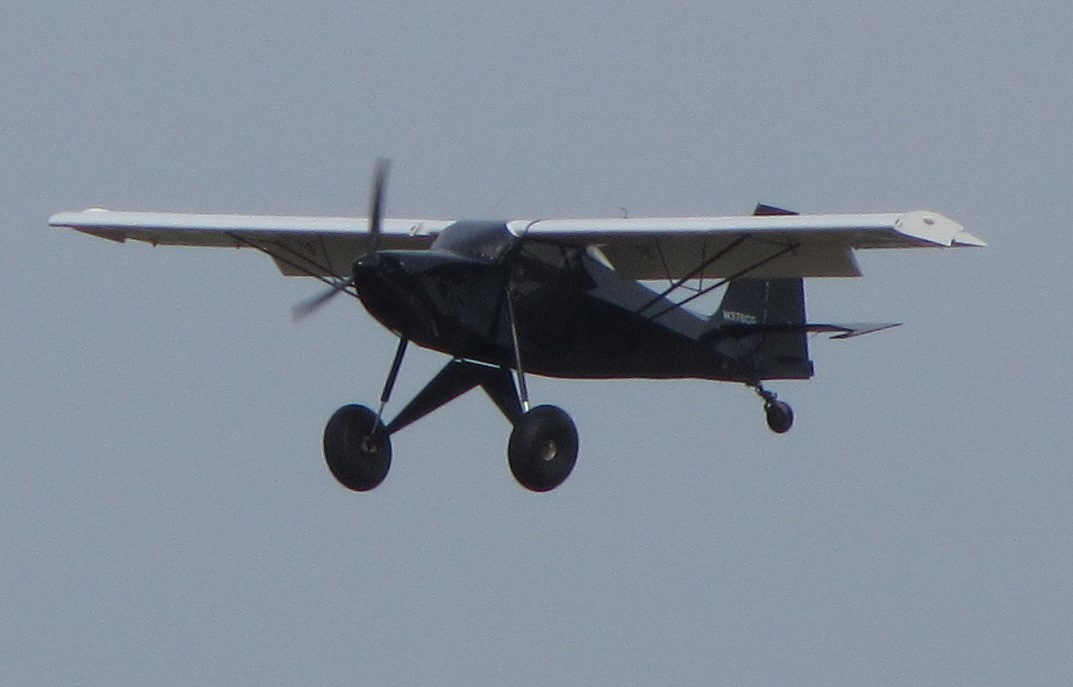
Just SuperSTOL showing the large tundra tires fitted

The Just SuperSTOL is an American STOL homebuilt aircraft, designed and produced by Just Aircraft of Walhalla, South Carolina. The aircraft is supplied as a kit for amateur construction.

== Design and development ==
The Superstol is a development of the Just Highlander and differs by the addition of automatic leading edge slats, a long stroke air shock robust landing gear with 29 in (74 cm) tundra tires, Fowler flaps and a newly designed tailplane. The resulting design features a strut-braced high-wing, a two-seats-in-side-by-side configuration enclosed cockpit accessed by doors, fixed conventional landing gear and a single engine in tractor configuration. It is designed for operation on rough airfields.

The aircraft fuselage is made from welded 4130 steel tubing, while the wing uses an aluminum spar and aluminum ribs, all covered in doped aircraft fabric. The wings are supported by "V" struts with jury struts and can be folded for ground transportation or storage without the need for disconnecting fuel lines or control connections. Standard engines available include the 80 hp (60 kW) Rotax 912UL, the 100 hp (75 kW) Rotax 912ULS or Rotax 912iS, the 115 hp (86 kW) Rotax 914, 85 hp (63 kW) Jabiru 2200, the 120 hp (89 kW) Jabiru 3300 and the 80 hp (60 kW) Volkswagen air-cooled engine, four-stroke powerplants. The aircraft can take-off and land in under 150 ft (46 m)

== Variants ==
SuperSTOL
Powered by a Rotax 912 or Rotax 914
SuperSTOL XL
Just Aircraft introduced the Stretch XL, a stretched version in 2015. It can accommodate engines such as the 180 hp UL Power 520 at 255 pounds and the 160 hp Lycoming O-320 at 315 pounds.

== Specifications (SuperSTOL) ==
Data from Kitplanes, Just Aircraft and Flying (magazine)

General characteristics

- Crew: one
- Capacity: one passenger
- Length: 19 ft 10 in (6.05 m)
- Wingspan: 30 ft 1 in (9.17 m)
- Height: 8 ft (2.4 m)
- Wing area: 132 sq ft (12.3 m^{2})
- Empty weight: 750 lb (340 kg)
- Gross weight: 1,320 lb (599 kg)
- Fuel capacity: 24 U.S. gallons (91 L; 20 imp gal)
- Powerplant: 1 × Rotax 912ULS four cylinder, liquid and air-cooled, four stroke aircraft engine, 100 hp (75 kW)
- Propellers: 2-bladed Catto, 6 ft 10 in (2.08 m) diameter
- Cruise speed: 100 mph (161 km/h, 87 kn)
- Stall speed: 32–37 mph (52–59 km/h, 28–32 kn)
- Never exceed speed: 120 mph (193 km/h, 104 kn)
- Range: 450 mi (720 km, 390 nmi)
- Rate of climb: 1,000 ft/min (5.1 m/s)
