= Dragon Wings =

Dragon Wings may refer to:

- A line of 1/400 scale model aircraft made by Dragon Models Limited of Hong-Kong, China
- A line of autogyro rotor blades made by Rotor Flight Dynamics of Wimauma, Florida, United States
