= Gyro-Kopp-Ters Midnight Hawk =

American autogyro

Midnight Hawk

General information
- Type: Autogyro
- National origin: United States
- Manufacturer: Gyro-Kopp-Ters
- Designer: Bob and Arden Kopp
- Status: In production (2015)

The Gyro-Kopp-Ters Midnight Hawk is an American autogyro, designed by Bob and Arden Kopp and produced by their company, Gyro-Kopp-Ters of Lake City, Florida. The aircraft is supplied as a kit for amateur construction or as a complete ready-to-fly-aircraft.

== Design and development ==
The Midnight Hawk features a single main rotor, a single-seat open cockpit with a windshield, tricycle landing gear with wheel pants and a four-cylinder, air-cooled, four-stroke, 90 hp (67 kW) Subaru EA-82 automotive conversion engine in pusher configuration. The engine is available with a belt reduction drive or as a direct drive version.

The aircraft mounts a 25 ft (7.6 m) diameter Dragon Wings main rotor made by Rotor Flight Dynamics, with a chord of 7 in (17.8 cm). Standard equipment fitted includes a hydraulic pre-rotator. The propeller used is a three-bladed Powerfin composite, ground adjustable with a 5 ft (1.5 m) diameter. The aircraft has an empty weight of 510 lb (231 kg) and a gross weight of 810 lb (367 kg), giving a useful load of 300 lb (136 kg).

The company estimates the assembly time from the supplied kit as 60 hours.

== Operational history ==
By November 2017 four examples had been registered in the United States with the Federal Aviation Administration.

== Specifications (Midnight Hawk) ==
Data from Bayerl and Gyro-Kopp-Ters

General characteristics

- Crew: one
- Length: 12 ft 1 in (3.68 m)
- Width: 5 ft 5 in (1.65 m)
- Height: 8 ft 2 in (2.49 m)
- Empty weight: 510 lb (231 kg)
- Gross weight: 810 lb (367 kg)
- Fuel capacity: 16 U.S. gallons (61 L; 13 imp gal)
- Powerplant: 1 × Subaru EA-82 four cylinder, air-cooled, four stroke automotive engine, 90 hp (67 kW)
- Main rotor diameter: 25 ft 0 in (7.62 m)
- Propellers: 3-bladed Powerfin composite, ground adjustable, 5 ft (1.5 m) diameter

Performance

- Maximum speed: 85 mph (137 km/h, 74 kn)
- Cruise speed: 50 mph (80 km/h, 43 kn)
- Never exceed speed: 120 mph (190 km/h, 100 kn)
- Rate of climb: 600 ft/min (3.0 m/s)
