= Lanitz Escapade Two =

German ultralight aircraft

Escapade Two

General information
- Type: Ultralight aircraft
- National origin: Germany
- Manufacturer: Lanitz Aviation
- Status: Production completed

History
- Developed from: Just Escapade

The Lanitz Escapade Two is a German ultralight aircraft, derived from the Just Escapade, that was produced by Lanitz Aviation of Leipzig. When it was available the aircraft was supplied complete and ready-to-fly.

By March 2018 the aircraft was no longer advertised on the company website and production has likely ended.

== Design and development ==
The aircraft was designed to comply with the Fédération Aéronautique Internationale microlight rules. It features a strut-braced high-wing, a two-seats-in-side-by-side configuration enclosed cockpit, convertible fixed tricycle landing gear and conventional landing gear and a single engine in tractor configuration.

The Escapade Two fuselage is made from powder coated welded steel tubing, with its wing made with an aluminium spar and spruce ribs. The aircraft is covered with Oratex aircraft fabric. Its 8.76 m (28.7 ft) span wing has an area of 10.11 m^{2} (108.8 sq ft) and can be folded for ground transportation on a trailer or for storage in two minutes. The standard engine available is the 95 hp (71 kW) ULPower UL260i four-stroke powerplant. The landing gear can be changed from nose wheel to tail wheel configuration in about two hours.

The Escapade Two is certified to United Kingdom BCAR Section "S" and German microlight standards.

== Specifications (Escapade Two) ==
Data from Bayerl

General characteristics

- Crew: one
- Capacity: one passenger
- Wingspan: 8.76 m (28 ft 9 in)
- Wing area: 10.11 m^{2} (108.8 sq ft)
- Empty weight: 265 kg (584 lb)
- Gross weight: 472.5 kg (1,042 lb)
- Fuel capacity: 70 litres (15 imp gal; 18 US gal)
- Powerplant: 1 × ULPower UL260i four cylinder, air-cooled, four stroke aircraft engine, 71 kW (95 hp)

Performance

- Maximum speed: 220 km/h (140 mph, 120 kn)
- Cruise speed: 167 km/h (104 mph, 90 kn)
- Stall speed: 63 km/h (39 mph, 34 kn)
- Rate of climb: 5 m/s (980 ft/min)
- Wing loading: 46.7 kg/m^{2} (9.6 lb/sq ft)
