= Gyro-Kopp-Ters =

American aircraft manufacturer

- Company type: Privately held company
- Industry: Aerospace
- Headquarters: Lake City, Florida, United States
- Key people: Bob and Arden Kopp
- Products: Autogyros
- Website: www.gyro-kopp-ters.com

Gyro-Kopp-Ters is an American aircraft manufacturer based in Lake City, Florida and founded by brothers Bob and Arden Kopp. The company specializes in the design and manufacture of autogyros in the form of kits for amateur construction.

The company makes a single seat autogyro, the Gyro-Kopp-Ters Midnight Hawk, and a two-seats in tandem model, the Gyro-Kopp-Ters Twin Eagle, both of which use Subaru automotive conversion engines and Dragon Wings main rotors made by Rotor Flight Dynamics.

== Aircraft ==
Summary of aircraft built by Gyro-Kopp-Ters
Model name	First flight	Number built	Type
Gyro-Kopp-Ters Midnight Hawk			single seat, open cockpit autogyro
Gyro-Kopp-Ters Twin Eagle			two seat, open cockpit autogyro
