= Gyro-Kopp-Ters Twin Eagle =

American autogyro

Twin Eagle

General information
- Type: Autogyro
- National origin: United States
- Manufacturer: Gyro-Kopp-Ters
- Designer: Bob and Arden Kopp
- Status: In production (2015)

The Gyro-Kopp-Ters Twin Eagle is an American autogyro, designed by Bob and Arden Kopp and produced by their company, Gyro-Kopp-Ters of Lake City, Florida. The aircraft is supplied as a kit for amateur construction or as a complete ready-to-fly-aircraft.

== Design and development ==
The Twin Eagle features a single main rotor, a two-seats-in tandem open cockpit with a windshield, tricycle landing gear with wheel pants and a four-cylinder, air-cooled, four-stroke, 120 hp (89 kW) Subaru EJ-22 automotive conversion engine in pusher configuration.

The aircraft mounts a 28 ft (8.5 m) diameter Dragon Wings main rotor made by Rotor Flight Dynamics, with a chord of 7 in (17.8 cm). Standard equipment fitted includes a hydraulic pre-rotator and dual controls. The propeller used is a four bladed Powerfin composite, ground adjustable type with a 68 in (1.73 m) diameter. The aircraft has an empty weight of 675 lb (306 kg) and a gross weight of 1,210 lb (549 kg), giving a useful load of 535 lb (243 kg).

The company estimates the assembly time from the supplied kit as 120 hours.

== Operational history ==
By November 2017 two examples had been registered in the United States with the Federal Aviation Administration.

== Specifications (Twin Eagle) ==
Data from Bayerl and Gyro-Kopp-Ters

General characteristics

- Crew: one
- Length: 14 ft 8 in (4.47 m)
- Width: 5 ft 3 in (1.60 m)
- Height: 9 ft 1 in (2.77 m)
- Empty weight: 675 lb (306 kg)
- Gross weight: 1,210 lb (549 kg)
- Fuel capacity: 16 U.S. gallons (61 L; 13 imp gal)
- Powerplant: 1 × Subaru EJ-22 four cylinder, air-cooled, four stroke automotive engine, 120 hp (89 kW)
- Main rotor diameter: 28 ft 0 in (8.53 m)
- Propellers: 4-bladed Powerfin composite, ground adjustable, 5 ft 8 in (1.73 m) diameter

Performance

- Maximum speed: 90 mph (140 km/h, 78 kn)
- Cruise speed: 60 mph (97 km/h, 52 kn)
- Never exceed speed: 120 mph (190 km/h, 100 kn)
- Rate of climb: 600 ft/min (3.0 m/s) at maximum gross weight
