= Lanitz Escapade One =

German ultralight aircraft

Escapade One

General information
- Type: Ultralight aircraft
- National origin: Germany
- Manufacturer: Lanitz Aviation
- Status: Production completed

The Lanitz Escapade One is a German ultralight aircraft produced by Lanitz Aviation. When it was available the aircraft was supplied complete and ready-to-fly.

By March 2018 the aircraft was no longer advertised on the company website and production has likely ended.

== Design and development ==
The Escape One was developed from the British Escapade Kid, which was in turn derived from the Flying K Sky Raider, an aircraft which in turn traces its origins to the Denney Kitfox. The Escapade One was designed to comply with the Fédération Aéronautique Internationale microlight rules. It features a strut-braced high-wing, a single-seat enclosed cockpit, fixed conventional landing gear and a single engine in tractor configuration.

The aircraft fuselage is made from welded steel, while the wing has an aluminum spar and wooden ribs. The aircraft is covered in Oratex UL 600 aircraft fabric. Its 8.94 m (29.3 ft) span wing has an area of 11.5 m^{2} (124 sq ft). The standard engine available is the German 32 hp (24 kW) Lanitz 3W 342 iB2 TS two-stroke powerplant.

The wing can be folded in two minutes for ground transport on a trailer or for storage.

== Specifications (Escapade One) ==
Data from Bayerl

General characteristics

- Crew: one
- Wingspan: 8.94 m (29 ft 4 in)
- Wing area: 11.5 m^{2} (124 sq ft)
- Empty weight: 119.5 kg (263 lb)
- Gross weight: 250 kg (551 lb)
- Fuel capacity: 50 litres (11 imp gal; 13 US gal) in two 25 litres (5.5 imp gal; 6.6 US gal) tanks
- Powerplant: 1 × Lanitz 3W 342 iB2 TS two stroke aircraft engine, 24 kW (32 hp)
- Propellers: 2-bladed composite

Performance

- Maximum speed: 163 km/h (101 mph, 88 kn)
- Cruise speed: 120 km/h (75 mph, 65 kn)
- Stall speed: 50 km/h (31 mph, 27 kn)
- Rate of climb: 3 m/s (590 ft/min)
- Wing loading: 21.7 kg/m^{2} (4.4 lb/sq ft)
