= Lanitz Aviation =

German aircraft manufacturer

- Type: Private company
- Industry: Aerospace
- Headquarters: Leipzig, Germany
- Products: Aircraft fabric systems, Ultralight aircraft
- Website: www.lanitz-aviation.com

Lanitz Aviation is a German aircraft manufacturer based in Leipzig. The company specializes in the design and manufacture of aircraft fabric systems and in particular their Oratex material for model and ultralight aircraft. The company also has developed and produces three ultralight aircraft that were originally produced by British manufacturers Escapade Aircraft and The Light Aircraft Company.

The company at one time produced its own two-stroke aircraft engine, the 32 hp (24 kW) Lanitz 3W 342 iB2 TS.

== Aircraft ==
Summary of aircraft built by Lanitz Aviation
Model name	First flight	Number built	Type
Lanitz Escapade One			Single seat, high wing, ultralight aircraft
Lanitz Escapade Two			Two seat, high wing, ultralight aircraft
Lanitz Sherwood Ranger			Two seat, biplane, ultralight aircraft
