= Flylight =

British aircraft manufacturer

Flylight Airsports
- Company type: Privately held company
- Industry: Aerospace
- Key people: Director / Chief Flying Instructor: Paul Dewhurst; Director/ Hang-gliding CFI: Stewart Bond; Director / Instructor / Designer: Ben Ashman
- Products: Ultralight trikes
- Website: www.flylight.co.uk

Flylight Airsports is a British aircraft manufacturer based in Northamptonshire. The company specializes in the design and manufacture of ultralight trikes and is noted for its line of retractable gear single seat aircraft, such as the Dragonfly. The company also acts as importer for several lines of aircraft including the Best Off Skyranger and the Aeros line of hang gliders.

In 2011 the company experimented with an electric aircraft derivative of the Dragonfly, designated the Flylight E-Dragon.

== Aircraft ==
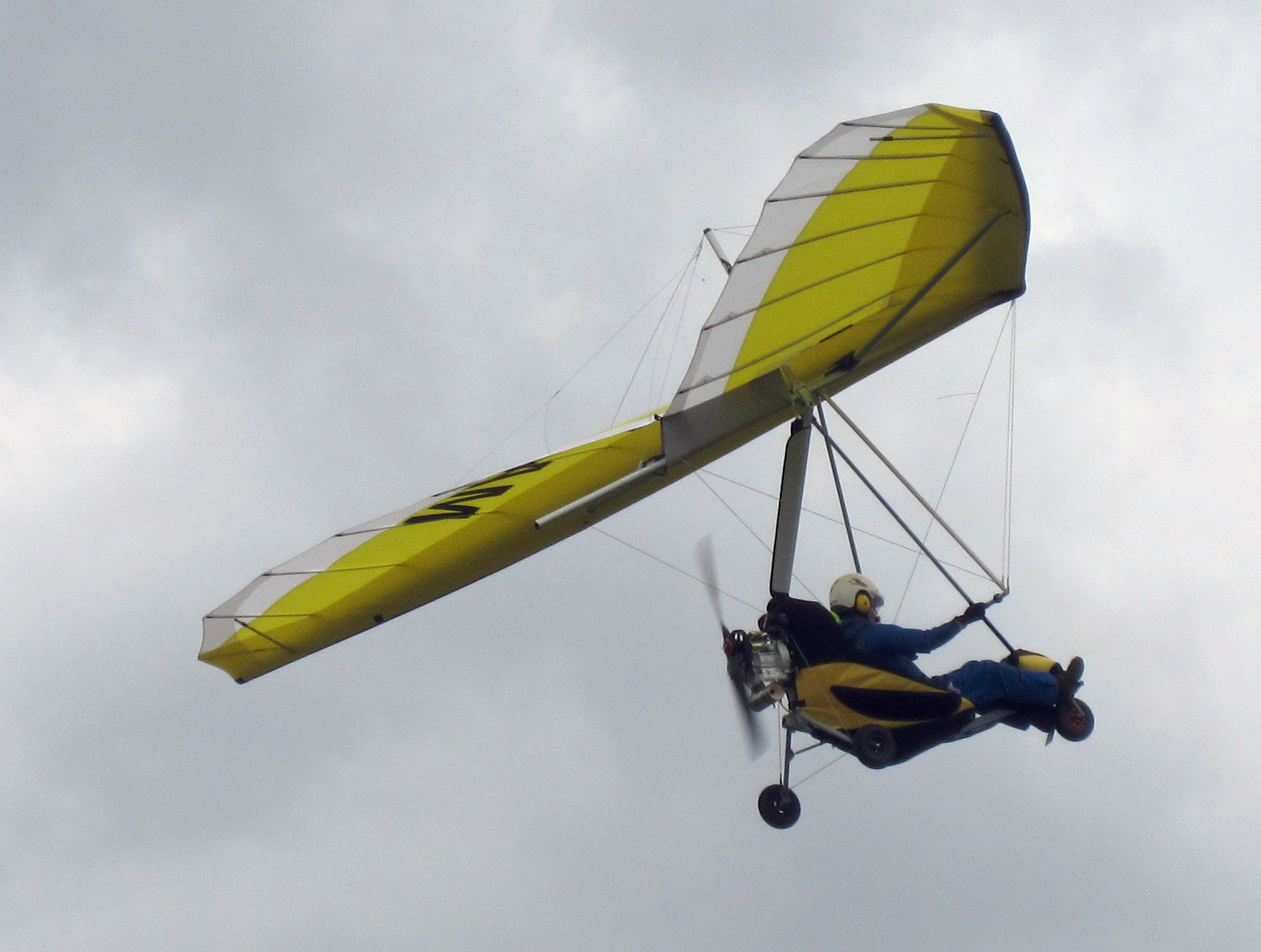
Flylight Motorfloater

Summary of aircraft built by Flylight
Model name	First flight	Number built	Type
Flylight Dragonfly			Ultralight trike
Flylight E-Dragon			Ultralight trike
Flylight Motorfloater	2010		Ultralight trike
Flylight Doodle Bug	1999		Powered hang glider
