= Flylight Dragonfly =

British ultralight trike

Dragonfly
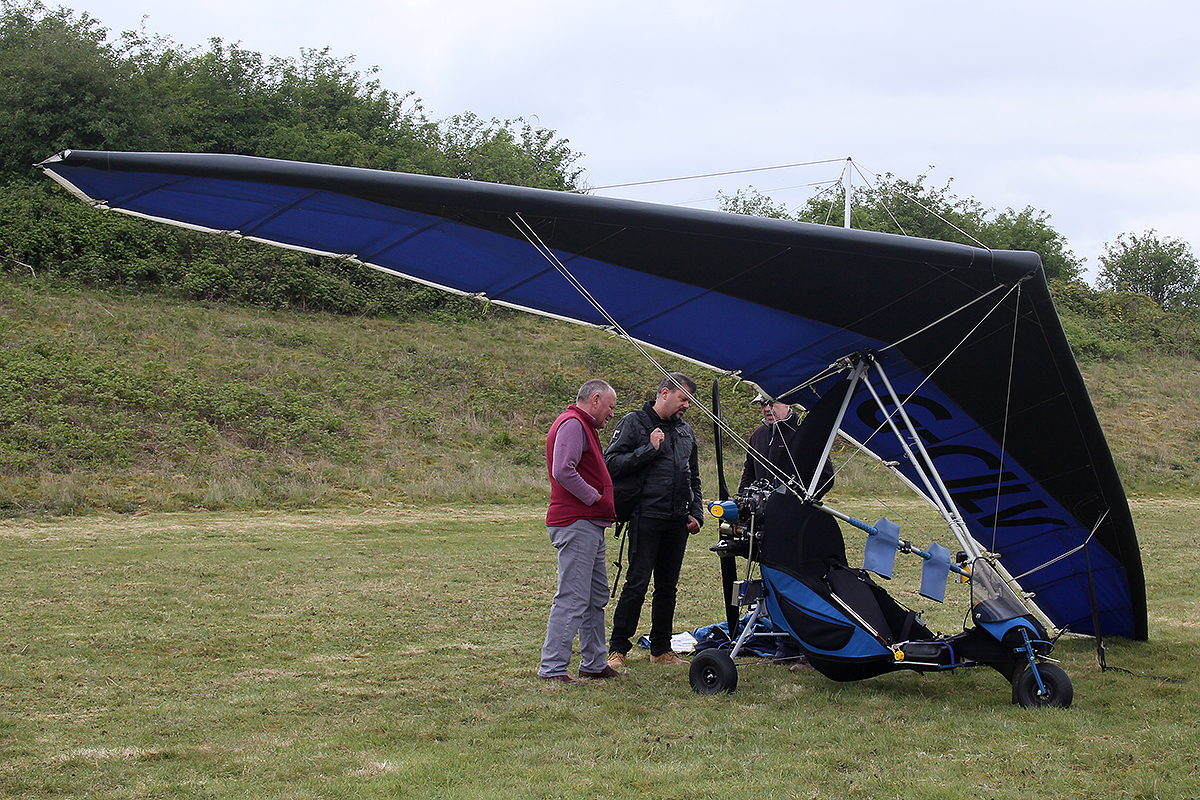

General information
- Type: Ultralight trike
- National origin: United Kingdom
- Manufacturer: Flylight Airsports
- Designer: Ben Ashman
- Status: In production (2013)

History
- Manufactured: 2008-present
- Introduction date: 2008
- First flight: 2007
- Variants: Flylight Motorfloater; Flylight E-Dragon

The Flylight Dragonfly is a British ultralight trike, designed by Ben Ashman and produced by Flylight Airsports of Northamptonshire. The aircraft is supplied as a complete ready-to-fly-aircraft.

Development of the Dragonfly started in 2007 with the aircraft entering series production in 2008.

== Design and development ==
The Dragonfly was designed to comply with the Fédération Aéronautique Internationale microlight category, the UK Single-Seat De-Regulation (SSDR) guidelines, as well as the US FAR 103 Ultralight Vehicles rules. It features a strut-braced Aeros Discus hang glider-style high-wing, weight-shift controls, a single-seat open cockpit, retractable tricycle landing gear and a single engine in pusher configuration.

The aircraft is made from bolted-together aluminum tubing, with its double surface wing covered in Dacron sailcloth. Its 10.3 m (33.8 ft) span wing is supported by a single tube-type kingpost and uses an "A" frame weight-shift control bar. The powerplant is a single cylinder, air-cooled four-stroke, 22 hp (16 kW) Bailey V4 200 engine, with the single cylinder, air-cooled, two-stroke 33 hp (25 kW) Simonini Mini-3 or 33 hp (25 kW) Simonini Mini-2 engines optional.

With the Bailey engine and the Aeros Discus 15T wing the Dragonfly has an empty weight of 80 kg (176 lb) and a full fuel capacity of 20 litres (4.4 imp gal; 5.3 US gal). With its manual, or optionally electrically retractable landing gear the aircraft can be folded up and ground transported in the trunk of a car.

A number of different wings can be fitted to the basic carriage, including Aeros Discus 15T, 14 and 12 as well as the Aeros Combat 12T.

== Variants ==
Flylight E-Dragon
Electric aircraft version.
Flylight Motorfloater
Simplified model with single surface wing and fixed landing gear.
Flylight Libelle
High performance variant equipped with a single cylinder, air-cooled, two-stroke 33 hp (25 kW) Simonini Mini-3 engine and the "topless" strut-braced Aeros Combat 12T wing.

== Specifications (Dragonfly) ==
Data from Bayerl

General characteristics

- Crew: one
- Wingspan: 10.3 m (33 ft 10 in)
- Wing area: 14.7 m^{2} (158 sq ft)
- Empty weight: 80 kg (176 lb)
- Fuel capacity: 20 litres (4.4 imp gal; 5.3 US gal)
- Powerplant: 1 × Bailey V4 200 single cylinder, air-cooled four-stroke, aircraft engine, 16 kW (22 hp)
- Propellers: 3-bladed Powerfin

Performance

- Maximum speed: 100 km/h (62 mph, 54 kn)
- Cruise speed: 57 km/h (35 mph, 31 kn)
- Stall speed: 38 km/h (24 mph, 21 kn)
- Rate of climb: 2.5 m/s (490 ft/min)
