= Rotor Flight Dynamics LFINO =

American autogyro

LFINO

General information
- Type: Autogyro
- National origin: United States
- Manufacturer: Rotor Flight Dynamics
- Designer: Ernie Boyette and Dick DeGraw
- Status: Prototype only (2011)
- Number built: One

History
- Introduction date: 2005
- First flight: February 2006

The Rotor Flight Dynamics LFINO (Leap Flight In Normal Operations and pronounced by the designers as "ell if I know") is an American experimental autogyro that was designed by Ernie Boyette and Dick DeGraw, with a single prototype produced by their company Rotor Flight Dynamics of Wimauma, Florida. The aircraft was intended as a proof-of-concept for evaluation for police or paramilitary use.

== Design and development ==
The LFINO was designed to test out the use of a powered rotor autogyro to allow zero speed take-offs and landings and more efficient forward flight. The design features a single three-bladed main rotor that was built in-house, a two-seats-in side-by-side configuration enclosed bulbous cockpit, tricycle landing gear mounted on stub wings, a triple tail and a single four cylinder liquid-cooled Subaru automotive engine in pusher configuration.

The aircraft's frame is made from aluminium and the cabin is of non-structural fiberglass. The aircraft is equipped with a helicopter-style collective pitch control to allow "jump" takeoffs. Take-offs are accomplished by powering the rotor system to 150% cruise rpm and then increasing collective rapidly to jump the aircraft into the air where it can then fly away.

== Operational history ==
The sole example was built in 2005 and registered in the United States with the Federal Aviation Administration in the Experimental - Amateur-built category on 21 March 2005. It first flew in about February 2006. The aircraft was first shown publicly at Wauchula, Florida during the Bensen Days show in April 2005 as a static display, since it had not then yet flown. It was first flown publicly during Bensen Days in April 2006. The prototype was exported to Spain and its US registration was cancelled on 11 April 2008.

== Specifications (LFINO) ==
Data from Aero News Network

General characteristics

- Crew: one
- Capacity: one passenger
- Empty weight: 1,050 lb (476 kg)
- Powerplant: 1 × Subaru four cylinder, liquid-cooled, four stroke automotive conversion engine

Performance

- Maximum speed: 120 kn (140 mph, 220 km/h) (projected)
