= Powerfin =

American propeller manufacturer

- Industry: Aerospace
- Founder: Stuart Gort
- Headquarters: Hurricane, Utah, United States
- Key people: President: Frederick Scheffel
- Products: Aircraft propellers
- Website: www.powerfin.com

Powerfin Propellers, is an American manufacturer of composite propellers for homebuilt, light-sport and ultralight aircraft, as well as wind power generation systems. The company headquarters is located in Hurricane, Utah, although it was formerly in El Campo, Texas and originated in Arlington, Washington.

== Products ==
Powerfin produces carbon fiber two, three, four and five-bladed propellers for two-stroke and four-stroke engines up to the Rotax 914 of 115 hp (86 kW).

The company is noted for its use of the Clark Y airfoil, infinite blade angle adjustment, as well as for the very low rotating inertia of its designs, a key wear factor on lightweight engine gearboxes. The propeller blades are constructed of carbon fiber and aramid pre-preg cloth with a foam core, and cured in an autoclave. The company's Apex series of two- to five-bladed propeller hubs were CAD/CAM designed and are created on a Haas VF-4 CNC vertical milling station.

== History ==
Founded by Stuart Gort, the company went out of business in 2009. It was acquired by powered parachute manufacturer Frederick Scheffel and production moved to Texas in late 2009 and then to Utah in 2012.

== Applications ==
- Canadian Phase I
- Chotia Weedhopper
- Cosmos Echo
- Escapade Kid
- Flylight Dragonfly
- Gyro-Kopp-Ters Midnight Hawk
- Gyro-Kopp-Ters Twin Eagle
- Just Escapade
- Midwest Hornet
- Powrachute Pegasus
- Rainbow Aerotrike
- Soaring Concepts Sky Trek
- Sundog One-Seater
- Sundog Two-Seater

== See also ==
- List of aircraft propeller manufacturers
