= Just Escapade =

Escapade
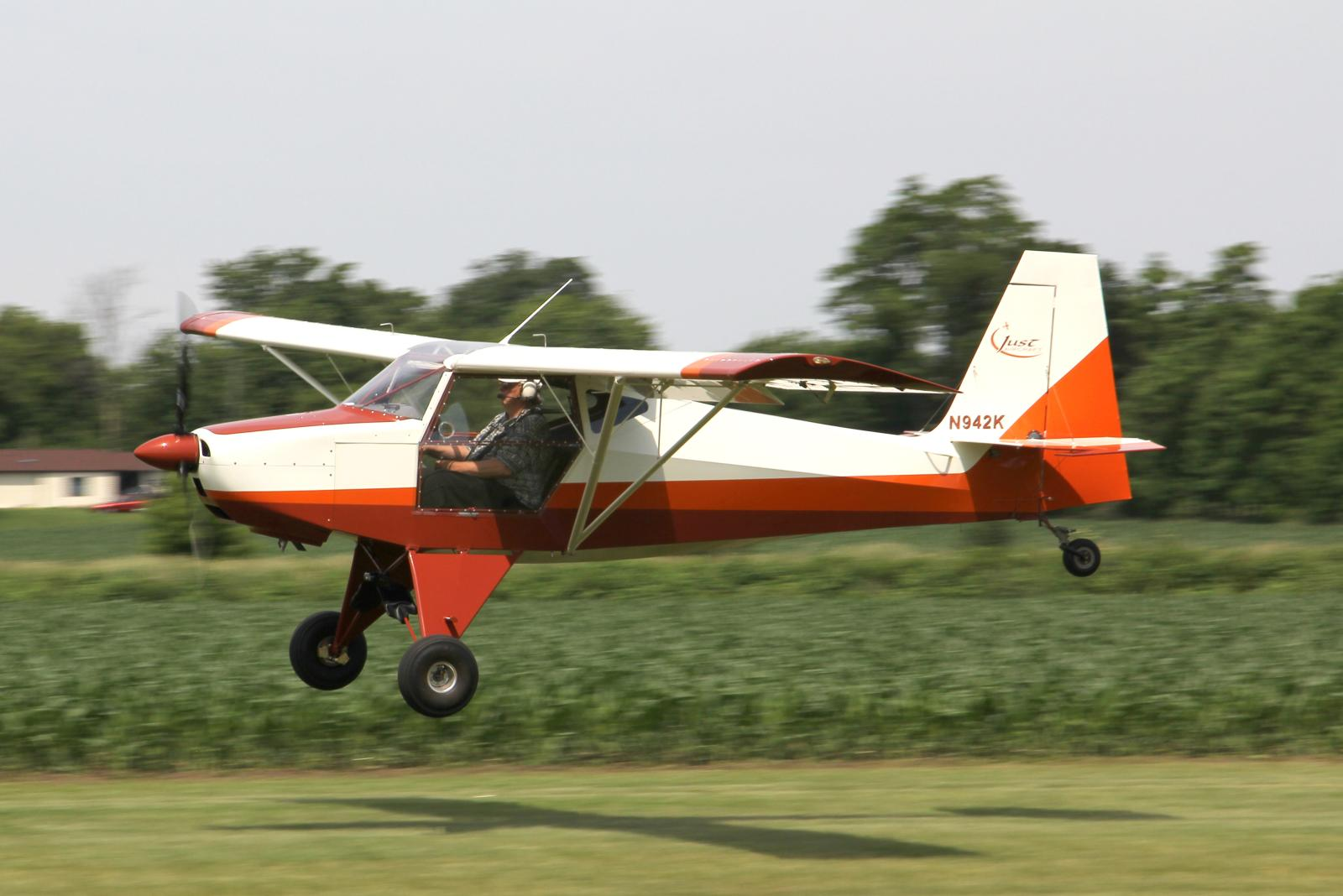
- Just Highlander

General information
- Type: Two seat ultralight aircraft
- National origin: United States
- Manufacturer: Just Aircraft LLC; Reality Aircraft Ltd
- Number built: 230 kits, all variants, by mid-2010

History
- First flight: 22 February 2003
- Variants: Lanitz Escapade Two; Just Superstol

The Just Escapade is a single-engine, high-wing light aircraft, seating two in side-by-side configuration. It was jointly developed in the United States and the United Kingdom in the early 2000s and by 2010 some 145 Escapades and its "bush plane" variant, the Highlander, had been built and many more kits sold.

== Design and development ==
The Escapade design can be traced back to that of the Avid Flyer, via the Denney Kitfox and Reality Easy Raider, marrying the Easy Raider's wing to a stretched Kitfox Lite fuselage. The key differences between the two types are the Escapade's side-by-side seating in a widened cabin, dual controls, and the option of a tricycle undercarriage It was developed jointly in the United States and United Kingdom by Just Aircraft and Reality Aircraft respectively, the American prototype flying in February 2003, four months before its British counterpart. These prototypes differed to fit into local classifications.

The Escapade has a Chromoloy steel frame and is largely fabric covered. The wings have constant chord, ending in Hoerner-type wingtips; the trailing edges are aluminum. The ailerons and flaps have glass fiber leading edges. The wings are braced to the lower fuselage longerons with V-form struts and vertical jury struts. The fuselage is polygonal in section, sloping inwards above and below the center line, with a flat aluminum upper surface that slopes upwards from the tail to the wing trailing edge, at the rear of the cabin. The empennage is conventional, the low aspect ratio tailplane with its swept leading edge and rounded elevators located at the top of the fuselage. There is a portside flight-adjustable elevator trim tab with optional electric drive. The unbalanced rudder extends to the keel, moving in a V-shaped gap between the elevators.

The seating is under the leading edge of the wing with a cabin roof window in the wing center section. Access is through side transparencies. Engine options include several Rotax or Jabiru units in the 37-89 kW (50-120 hp) range, driving two- or three-blade propellers and enclosed in a cowling manufactured from composite materials. Both undercarriage versions have the main wheels on faired-in V-form struts mounted on the lower fuselage longerons, with rubber-sprung half axles fixed to a compression frame. The conventional tailwheel is steerable but the alternative nose wheel castors freely, though a steerable version is planned.

The Highlander version, intended for rough airstrips and marketed only in the United States, is designed to fly slowly and has a more robust undercarriage. Its wing has a 3 ft (910 mm) greater span, with vortex generators over the whole upper leading edge, and the fin is square cornered and 8 in (200 mm) taller. Its tail control surfaces are horn balanced and increased in area. The Highlander always has the conventional undercarriage, strengthened, with tundra tires and enhanced brakes. A 99 hp (74 kW) Rotax 912 ULS engine is fitted and allows a maximum takeoff weight of 1,320 lbs (598 kg).

The Jabiru-engined United Kingdom prototype Escapade gained its permit to fly in September 2003 and the SLA prototype received British Civil Aircraft Rules section S approval from the Light Aircraft Association in April 2008. The Highlander was introduced in 2004.

== Operational history ==
The Escapade made its first public appearance in the United States at the Sun 'n Fun airshow at Lakeland, Florida in April 2003 and in the United Kingdom at the Popular Flying Association International Rally at Kemble in July. The type was Grand Champion lightplane at the following year's Sun 'n Fun. By mid-2010 some 230 kits had been produced, with more than 65 Escapades and 80 Highlanders built and flown.

In early 2012 there were 34 Escapades on the United Kingdom register. One ex-United Kingdom aircraft had by 2010 moved to the Irish Republic register.

As of January 2019 there are four Highlanders registered in New Zealand.

== Variants ==
(Note: Despite the similar name, the Escapade Kid is not a direct relative of the Escapade Jane's All the World's Aircraft 2012-13, p.590)

Escapade
Standard version, with range of engines, including the 100 hp (75 kW) Rotax 912ULS, the 115 hp (86 kW) turbocharged Rotax 914, 85 hp (63 kW) Jabiru 2200 and the 120 hp (89 kW) Jabiru 3300 powerplants., choice of undercarriage; kits sold in both the United States and United Kingdom; 65 flown by 2010.
Escapade Two
Version built by Escapade Aircraft of Salisbury, United Kingdom. The original Escapade model was renamed Escapade Two from 2011 to differentiate it from the single-seat version.

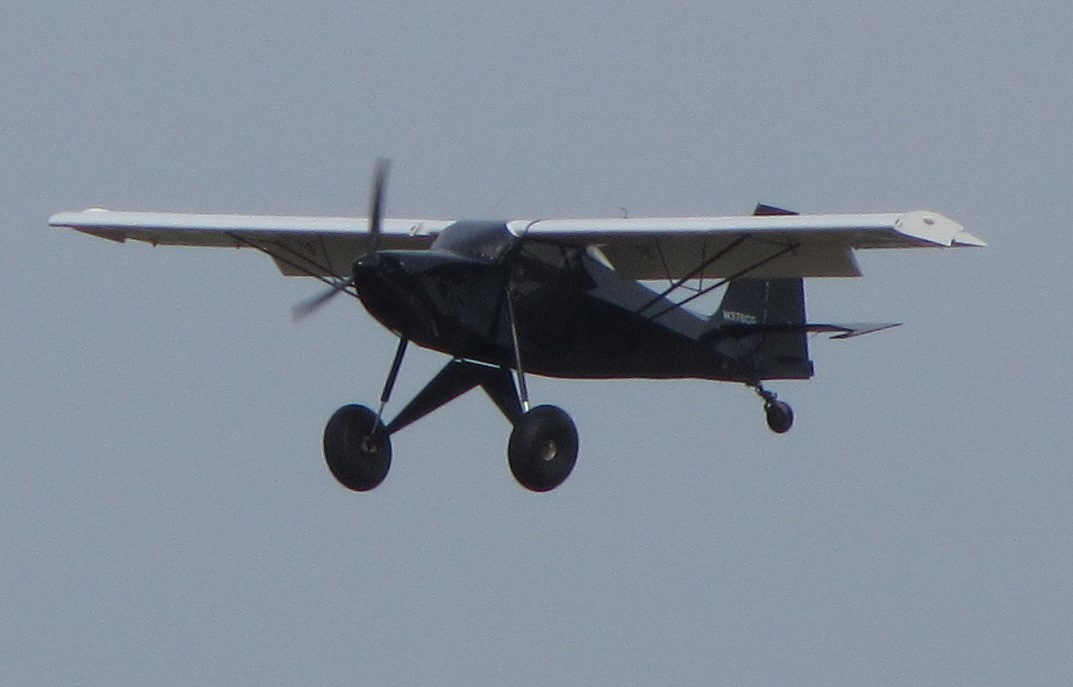
Just Superstol landing

Highlander
Larger wing, with anti-stall devices; larger fin and elevators; balanced tail control surfaces; strengthened conventional undercarriage. Engines are the 100 hp (75 kW) Rotax 912ULS, the 115 hp (86 kW) turbocharged Rotax 914, 85 hp (63 kW) Jabiru 2200 and the 120 hp (89 kW) Jabiru 3300 powerplants. Kits sold in the United States only. 80 flown by 2010.

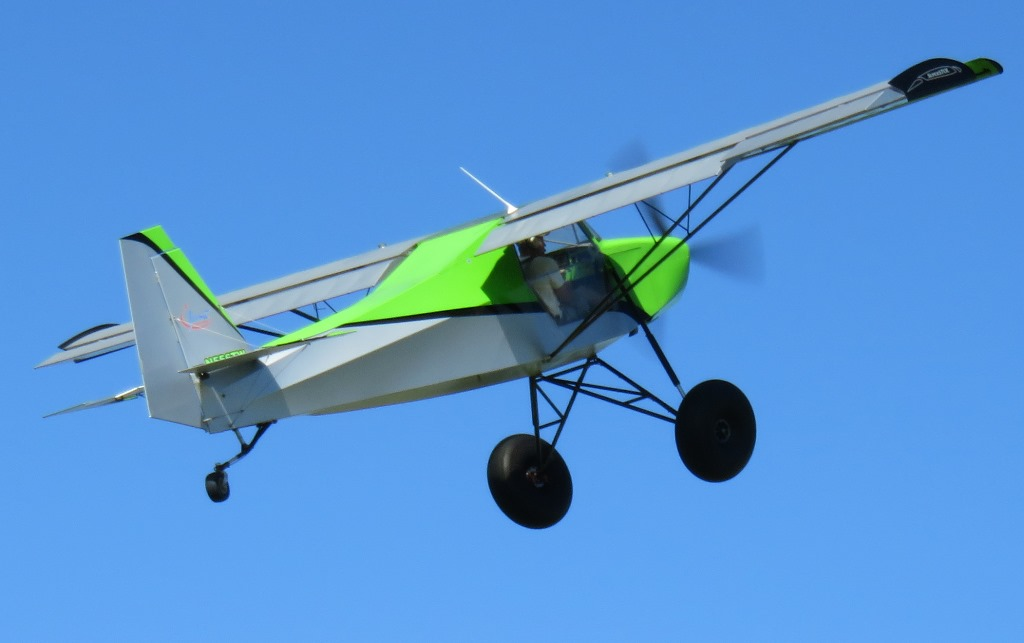
Just Aircraft SuperSTOL takeoff

Just Superstol
Development of the Highlander with leading edge slats and robust landing gear.

== Specifications (Escapade, Rotax UL) ==
Data from Jane's All the World's Aircraft 2011/12

General characteristics

- Capacity: two
- Length: 19 ft 0 in (5.79 m) excluding propeller. Wings folded 19 ft 2 in (5.84 m)
- Wingspan: 28 ft 6 in (8.69 m)
- Width: 7 ft 11.5 in (2.426 m) wings folded
- Height: 5 ft 9 in (1.75 m) with tailwheel undercarriage
- Wing area: 108.0 sq ft (10.03 m^{2})
- Empty weight: 562 lb (255 kg) UK; US, 615 lb (279 kg)
- Max takeoff weight: 992 lb (450 kg) UK; US, 1,320 lb (598 kg)
- Fuel capacity: 68 L (18.0 US gal; 15.0 Imp gal) standard
- Powerplant: 1 × Rotax 912UL air- and water-cooled flat four
- Propellers: 2-bladed Powerfin

Performance

- Cruise speed: 92 mph (150 km/h, 80 kn) ;as all performance data, at maximum US take-off weight
- Stall speed: 26 mph (43 km/h, 23 kn) power off, flaps down
- Never exceed speed: 130 mph (210 km/h, 110 kn)
- g limits: +4/-2
- Take-off run: 300 ft (92 m)
- Landing run: 300 ft (92 m)
