= Flylight Motorfloater =

British ultralight trike

Motorfloater
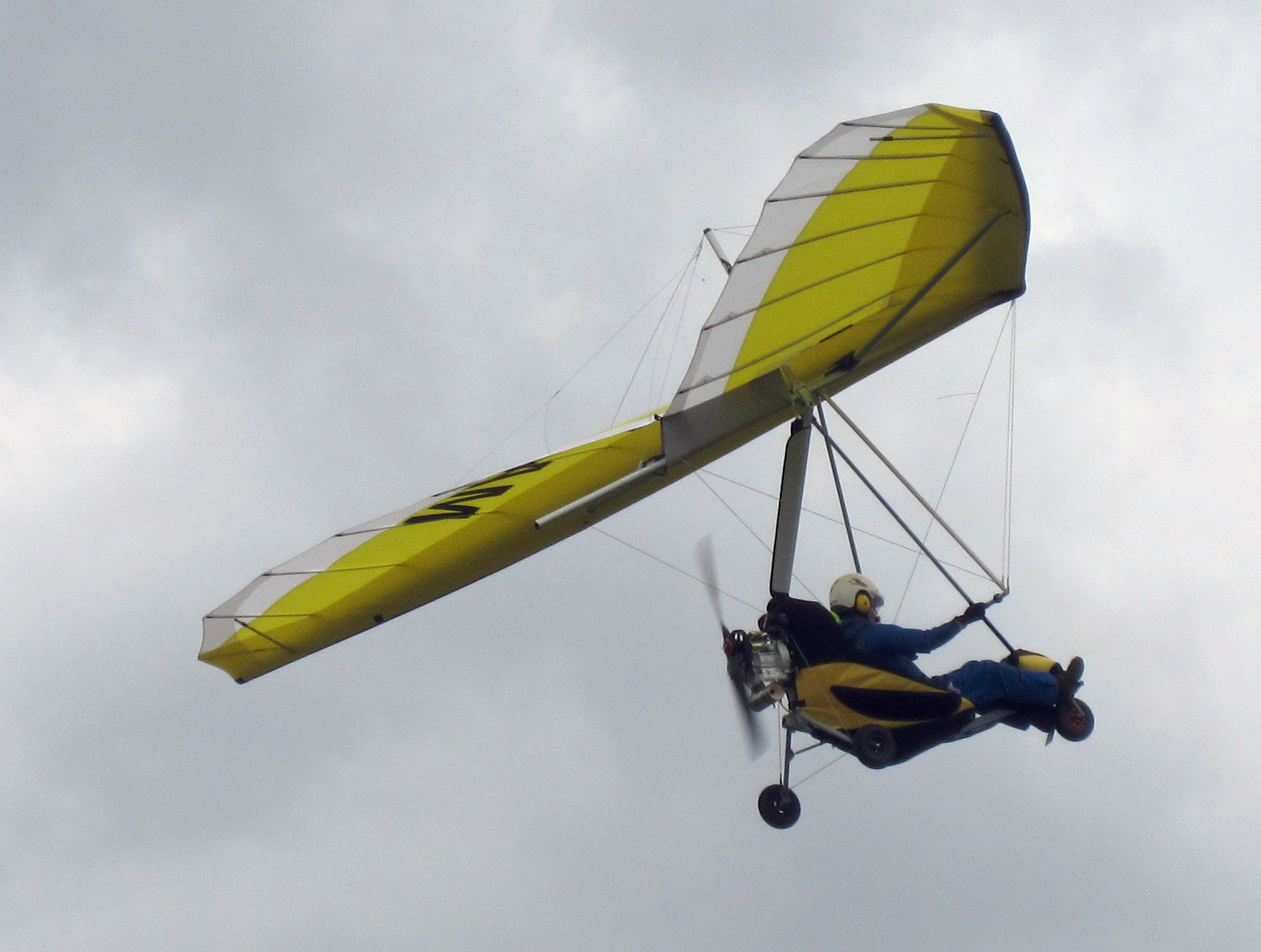

General information
- Type: Ultralight trike
- National origin: United Kingdom
- Manufacturer: Flight Airsports
- Designer: Ben Ashman
- Status: In production (2013)

History
- Introduction date: 2010

The Flylight Motorfloater is a British ultralight trike, designed by Ben Ashman and produced by Flylight Airsports of Northamptonshire. The aircraft is supplied as a complete ready-to-fly-aircraft.

The Motorfloater was introduced at the Flying Show in Birmingham in 2010.

== Design and development ==
The Motorfloater is intended as a simple, light and inexpensive aircraft with an emphasis on ease of handling and enjoyment, rather than speed. It was derived from the more complex Flylight Dragonfly and designed to comply with the Fédération Aéronautique Internationale microlight category as well as the US FAR 103 Ultralight Vehicles rules. It features a cable-braced hang glider-style high-wing, weight-shift controls, a single-seat open cockpit without a cockpit fairing, tricycle landing gear without wheel pants and a single engine in pusher configuration.

The aircraft is made from bolted-together aluminum tubing, with its single surface wing covered in Dacron sailcloth. Its standard 9.60 m (31.5 ft) span Aeros Fox 16T wing is supported by a single tube-type kingpost and uses an "A" frame weight-shift control bar. Powerplants available are the single cylinder, air-cooled, four-stroke, 22 hp (16 kW) Bailey V4 200 engine and the single cylinder, air-cooled, two-stroke, 25 hp (19 kW) Simonini Mini 2 engine. The aircraft has an empty weight of 72 kg (159 lb) and a gross weight of 205 kg (452 lb), giving a useful load of 133 kg (293 lb). With full fuel of 20 litres (4.4 imp gal; 5.3 US gal) the payload is 118 kg (260 lb).

A number of different wings can be fitted to the basic carriage, including the standard Aeros Fox 16T, Aeros Discus 14T and 15T as well as the Aeros Combat 12T.

== Specifications (Motorfloater with Fox 16T wing) ==
Data from Bayerl

General characteristics

- Crew: one
- Wingspan: 9.60 m (31 ft 6 in)
- Wing area: 16.2 m^{2} (174 sq ft)
- Empty weight: 72 kg (159 lb)
- Gross weight: 205 kg (452 lb)
- Fuel capacity: 20 litres (4.4 imp gal; 5.3 US gal)
- Powerplant: 1 × Simonini Mini 2 single cylinder, air-cooled, two stroke aircraft engine, 19 kW (25 hp)
- Propellers: 2-bladed composite

Performance

- Maximum speed: 80 km/h (50 mph, 43 kn)
- Cruise speed: 53 km/h (33 mph, 29 kn)
- Stall speed: 30 km/h (19 mph, 16 kn)
- Rate of climb: 2.5 m/s (490 ft/min)
- Wing loading: 12.7 kg/m^{2} (2.6 lb/sq ft)
