= Canadian Phase I =

Canadian powered parachute

Phase I

General information
- Type: Powered parachute
- National origin: Canada
- Manufacturer: Canadian Powered Parachutes
- Status: Production completed

The Canadian Phase I is a Canadian powered parachute that was designed and produced by Canadian Powered Parachutes of Vegreville, Alberta, introduced in 2000.

== Design and development ==
The aircraft was designed to comply with Canadian basic ultralight rules. It features a parachute-style high wing made from rip-stop nylon, two seats in tandem accommodation, tricycle landing gear and a single 64 hp (48 kW) Rotax 582 engine in pusher configuration.

The aircraft is built from bolted-together aluminium tubing. Inflight steering is accomplished via foot pedals that actuate the canopy brakes, creating roll and yaw. On the ground the aircraft has lever-controlled nosewheel steering. The main landing gear incorporates shock absorber-type suspension. The standard canopy supplied was the Quantum Advantage High Performance of 500 sq ft (46 m^{2}) area. This canopy provides a cruise speed of 30 to 35 mph (48 to 56 km/h) and a payload of 510 lb (230 kg). A larger canopy of 550 sq ft (51 m^{2}) that provides a slower cruise speed of 25 to 30 mph (40 to 48 km/h), a slower stall speed, a higher rate of climb and a payload of 610 lb (280 kg) was also available.

Factory optional equipment included a windshield, snow skis for winter operations, electric starting, a canopy-monitoring mirror and an agricultural aircraft kit.

== Specifications (Phase I with Quantum Advantage High Performance wing) ==
Data from Cliche

General characteristics

- Crew: one
- Capacity: one passenger
- Wing area: 500 sq ft (46 m^{2})
- Empty weight: 290 lb (132 kg)
- Gross weight: 800 lb (363 kg)
- Fuel capacity: 10 U.S. gallons (38 L; 8.3 imp gal)
- Powerplant: 1 × Rotax 582 twin cylinder, two-stroke, liquid-cooled aircraft engine, 64 hp (48 kW)
- Propellers: three-bladed Powerfin

Performance

- Cruise speed: 35 mph (56 km/h, 30 kn)
- Rate of climb: 700 ft/min (3.6 m/s)
