= Flylight E-Dragon =

British electric ultralight trike

E-Dragon

General information
- Type: Ultralight trike
- National origin: United Kingdom
- Manufacturer: Flylight Airsports
- Designer: Ben Ashman
- Status: Under development (2011)

History
- Developed from: Flylight Dragonfly

The Flylight E-Dragon is a British electric ultralight trike, designed by Ben Ashman and prototyped by Flylight Airsports of Northamptonshire. The aircraft was under development in 2011.

== Design and development ==
The aircraft was developed from the Flylight Dragonfly single place, retractable landing gear trike. The E-Dragon features a cable-braced hang glider-style high-wing, weight-shift controls, a single-seat open cockpit without a cockpit fairing, retractable tricycle landing gear and a single electric motor in pusher configuration.

The aircraft is made from bolted-together aluminum tubing, with its double surface wing covered in Dacron sailcloth. Its 10.3 m (33.8 ft) span wing is supported by a single tube-type kingpost and uses an "A" frame weight-shift control bar. The powerplant is a 10 kW (13 hp) Geiger HP Direct 10 electric motor powering a folding 140 cm (55 in) propeller. The power source is a 2.6 kWh Lithium ion battery, which provides a normal flight duration of 30 minutes or 15 minutes at full power.

A number of different engines have been tested, including an E-Lift 10 kW (13 hp) plus an electric powerplant of 13.5 kW (18 hp). The prototype used an Aeros Discus wing.

== Specifications (E-Dragon) ==
Data from Bayerl

General characteristics

- Crew: one
- Wingspan: 10.3 m (33 ft 10 in)
- Wing area: 14.7 m^{2} (158 sq ft)
- Powerplant: 1 × Geiger HP Direct 10 electric aircraft engine with a 2.6 kWh Lithium Ion battery, 9.7 kW (13 hp)
- Propellers: 2-bladed folding composite

Performance

- Maximum speed: 95 km/h (59 mph, 51 kn)
- Cruise speed: 70 km/h (43 mph, 38 kn)
- Endurance: 30 minutes at normal power
- Rate of climb: 2.3 m/s (450 ft/min)
