= Lanitz 3W 342 iB2 TS =

German aircraft motor

3W 342 iB2 TS
- Type: Aircraft engine
- National origin: Germany
- Manufacturer: Lanitz Aviation

The Lanitz 3W 342 iB2 TS (sometimes written 3W-342iB2 TS) is a German aircraft engine, designed and produced by Lanitz Aviation of Leipzig for use in ultralight aircraft.

By March 2018, the engine was no longer advertised on the company website and seems to be out of production.

== Design and development ==
The engine is a twin-cylinder two-stroke, horizontally-opposed, 342 cc (20.9 cu in) displacement, air-cooled, petrol engine design, with a poly V belt reduction drive. It employs dual electronic ignition and produces 32 hp (24 kW) at 6500 rpm.

== Applications ==
- Lanitz Escapade One

== Specifications (3W 342 iB2 TS) ==
Data from Tacke

=== General characteristics ===
- Type: Twin cylinder, two stroke aircraft engine
- Bore: 66 mm (2.6 in)
- Stroke: 50 mm (2.0 in)
- Displacement: 342 cc (20.9 cu in)
- Dry weight: 8.7 kg (19.2 lb)

=== Components ===
- Fuel type: petrol
- Cooling system: air
- Reduction gear: poly V belt

=== Performance ===
- Power output: 32 hp (24 kW)

== See also ==
Related lists

- List of aircraft engines
