= Tiger Cub Developments Sherwood Ranger =

Sherwood Ranger
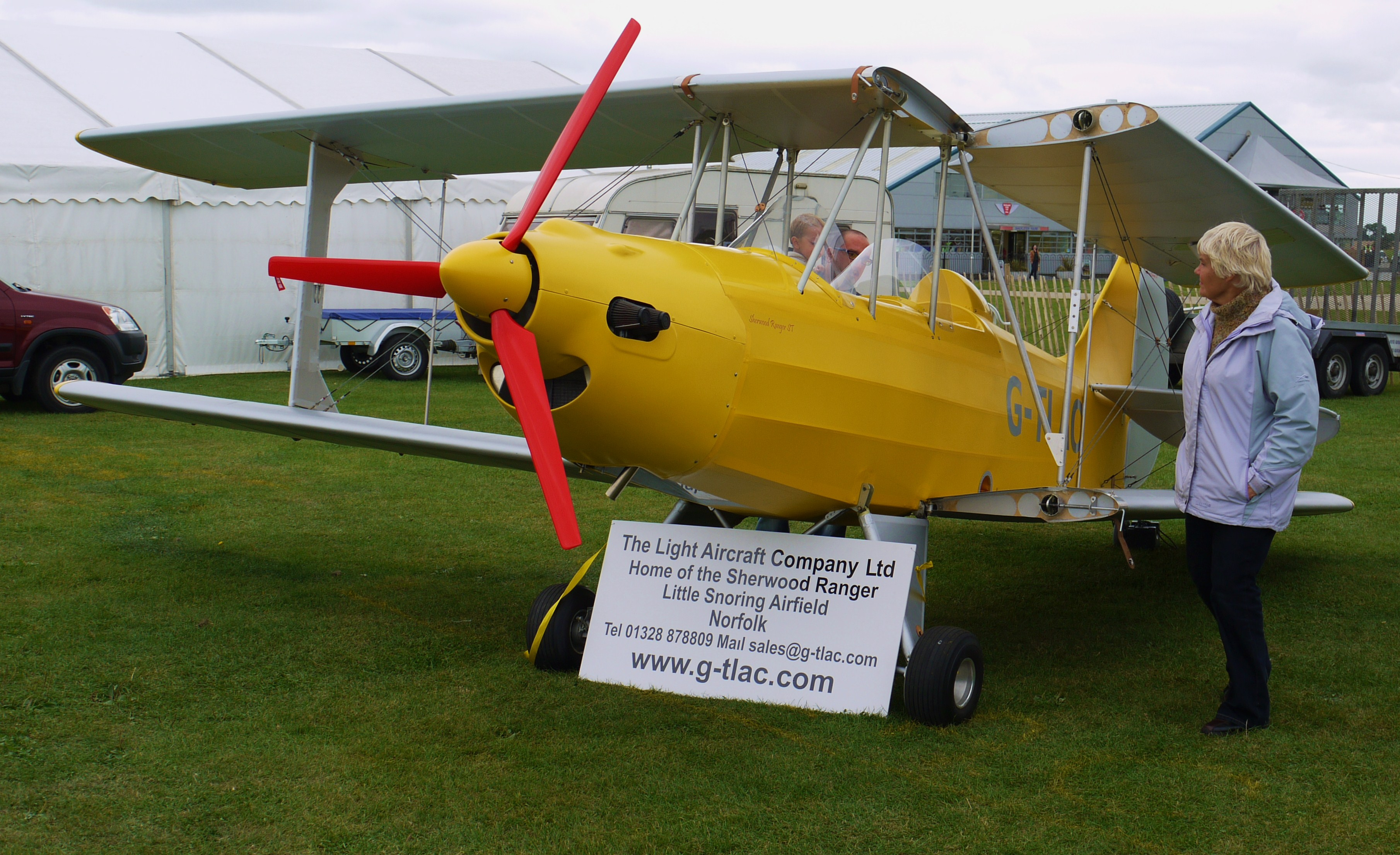

General information
- Type: Two seat biplane microlight
- National origin: United Kingdom
- Manufacturer: Tiger Cub Developments Ltd, Doncaster later The Light Aircraft Company Ltd and Lanitz Aviation
- Designer: Russ Light

History
- First flight: 1992

The Tiger Cub Developments (TCD) Sherwood Ranger is a single engine, tandem two seat biplane microlight designed and built in the United Kingdom in the early 1990s. Kits were originally produced by TCD; later, design rights were acquired by The Light Aircraft Company Ltd (TLAC) who resumed kit production in 2009.

== Design and development ==
The TCD Sherwood Ranger was designed by Russ Light as a successor to the Micro Biplane Aviation Tiger Cub, a foldable biplane built in Worksop. Almost 100 Tiger Cubs, which Light partly designed, appeared on the UK civil aircraft register. The Sherwood Ranger is named after an inn in Retford, Nottinghamshire, perhaps the only aircraft to be named after a public house.

The Sherwood Ranger is a single bay biplane, its wings having 3.83° of sweepback, 3° of dihedral on the lower wing alone but no stagger. They have constant chord and are of mixed construction, with single aluminium spars and drag struts, plywood covered D-box leading edges, ply and spruce ribs and fabric covering. There are externally interconnected Frise ailerons on both upper and lower wings. The latter are mounted on the lower fuselage longerons and single, faired, deep chord, I-shaped interplane struts position the upper wing well above the fuselage, assisted by central cabane struts. These latter struts, together with the wing centre section, are part of the tubular aluminium fuselage structure. Additional bracing is provided by two flying wires and two landing wires on each side. The wings fold for transport.

The fuselage of the Sherwood Ranger has an aluminium tube structure, with ply formers and spruce stringers, and is fabric covered apart from glass fibre mouldings in the engine and cockpit areas and forming the rear decking. The nose is quite slender; the separate open cockpits are in tandem with the forward one a little behind the leading edge of the wing and the other under the trailing edge, where a slight upper wing cut-out improves the pilot's view. The fin is integral with the fuselage structure and carries a deep, rounded rudder which extends to the lower fuselage. The tailplane, mounted on top of the fuselage, has an unusually low aspect ratio and is almost semicircular in plan. These horizontal surfaces are thin and without camber. Separate elevators allows rudder movement between them. The tailplane is braced to the top of the fin and to the fuselage bottom. The fixed conventional undercarriage has mainwheels, fitted with brakes, on split axles mounted from a bungee sprung compression frame below the central fuselage and hinged by faired, V-form legs to its lower longerons. There is a bungee sprung, castoring tailwheel.

The Sherwood Ranger first flew in 1992. Several versions of the Ranger have been built, with different maximum take-off weights (MTOW) and engines. The early aircraft were built as the LW variant, with a MTOW of 390 kg (860 lb) and with engines in the 37-49 kW (50-65 hp) power range. Engines fitted include the 48 kW (64 hp) Rotax 532, the similar 48 kW (64 hp) Rotax 582 two cylinder two stroke engine and the 64 kW (86 hp) Jabiru 2200 flat four. Some were later built as, or upgraded to, an MTOW of 450 kg (990 lb), the ST variant standard. Some of these use the Rotax 582 or Jabiru engines and one is fitted with a BMW RS1100. The LW is no longer offered but the ST is available for building from plans, kit or quick build kit. The XP variant has short span wing (7.07 m (23 ft 2 in) to provide aerobatic capability and can be fitted with engines rated up to 75 kW (101 hp).

Twelve Sherwood Rangers kits were produced by TCD until the death of Russ Light, after which the company ceased to trade. TLAC acquired the rights in 2007, flew their first prototype on 31 July 2009 and in 2010 were working on an XP prototype with the target of aerobatic approval.

== Operational history ==
Twelve Rangers have been on the UK civil register, though not all have flown or retain permits to fly. One of these was transferred to Italy. One XP was built in the USA. By 2009 TLAC had sold two of its own kits. Construction of Rangers continues; one incomplete example appears on the Maltese register.

== Variants ==
LW
Original version, MTOW 390 kg (860 lb) microlight. TCD designation RA5. 8 initially on UK register, from which 1 has moved to Italy.
ST
MTOW of 450 kg (990 lb) microlight. 4 on UK register.
XP
Short span with aerobatic potential, MTOW of 450 kg (990 lb). TCD designation RA7. 2 registered in the UK as fixed wing aircraft and 1 in USA in the experimental category.
Lanitz Sherwood Ranger
Model produced by Lanitz Aviation of Leipzig, Germany, powered by a 95 hp (71 kW) ULPower UL260i four-stroke engine. Available as a kit, quick-build kit of ready-to-fly.

== Specifications (ST) ==
Data from Jane's All the World's Aircraft 2011/12

General characteristics

- Capacity: 2
- Length: 6.18 m (20 ft 3 in)
- Wingspan: 7.92 m (26 ft 0 in)
- Height: 2.375 m (7 ft 10 in) to fin tip, tail up
- Wing area: 15.61 m^{2} (168.0 sq ft)
- Empty weight: 182 kg (401 lb)
- Max takeoff weight: 450 kg (992 lb)
- Fuel capacity: 24 L (6.3 US gal; 5.3 Imp gal)
- Powerplant: 1 × Rotax 582 water cooled 2 cylinder two-stroke engine, 48 kW (64 hp)
- Propellers: 3-bladed, 1.73 m (5 ft 8 in) diameter ground adjustable pitch, geared down 3.0:1

Performance

- Maximum speed: 130 km/h (81 mph, 70 kn)
- Cruise speed: 96 km/h (60 mph, 52 kn) economical
- Stall speed: 61 km/h (38 mph, 33 kn)
- Never exceed speed: 161 km/h (100 mph, 87 kn)
- Range: 320 km (199 mi, 173 nmi)
- g limits: +6/-4
