= Just Aircraft =

American aircraft manufacturer

Just Aircraft LLC
- Company type: Privately held company
- Industry: Aerospace
- Founded: 2002
- Founder: Troy Woodland
- Headquarters: Walhalla, South Carolina, United States
- Key people: Gary Schmitt
- Products: STOL light aircraft
- Website: www.justaircraft.com

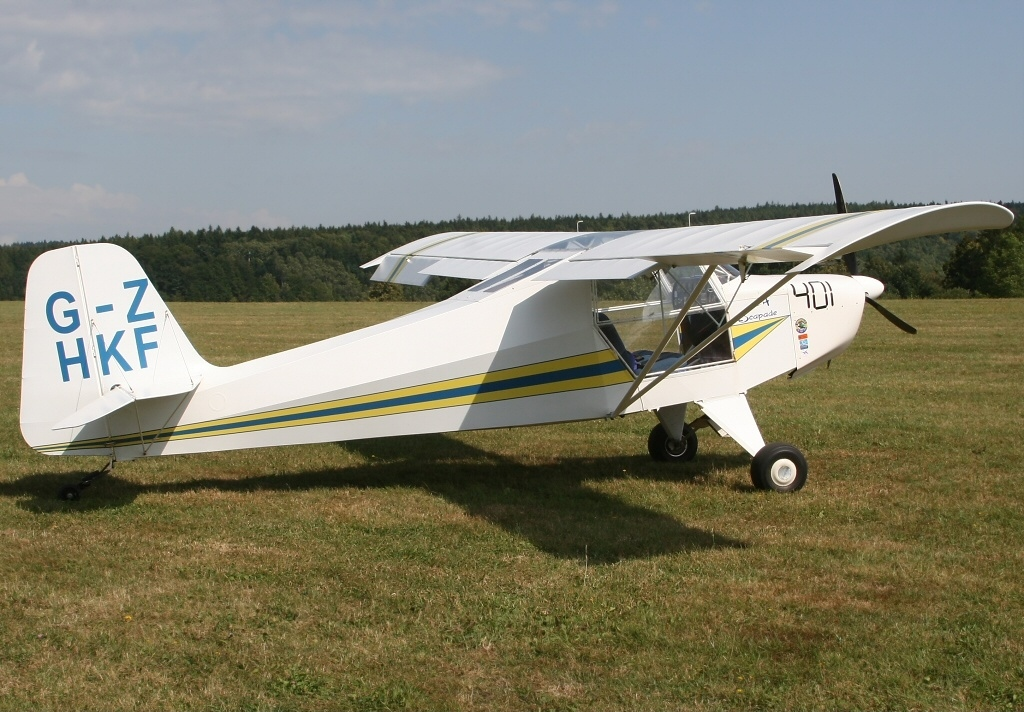
Just Escapade

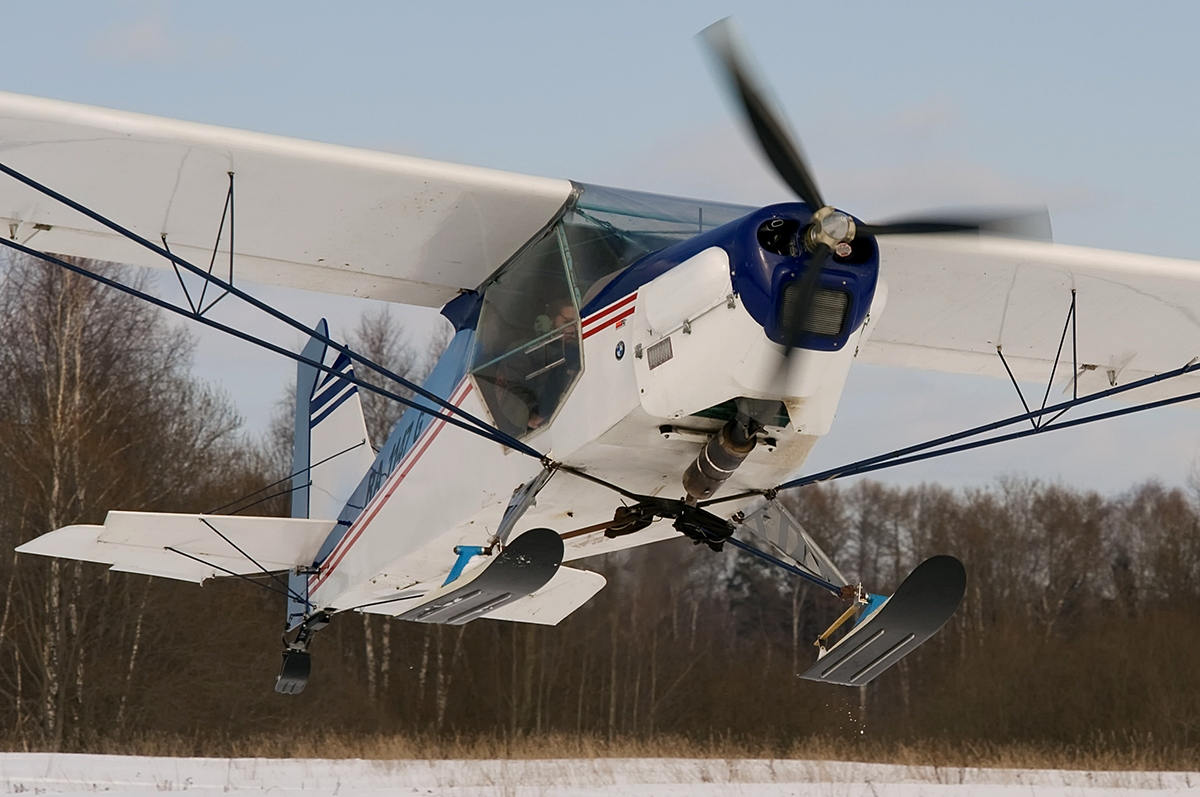
Just Highlander

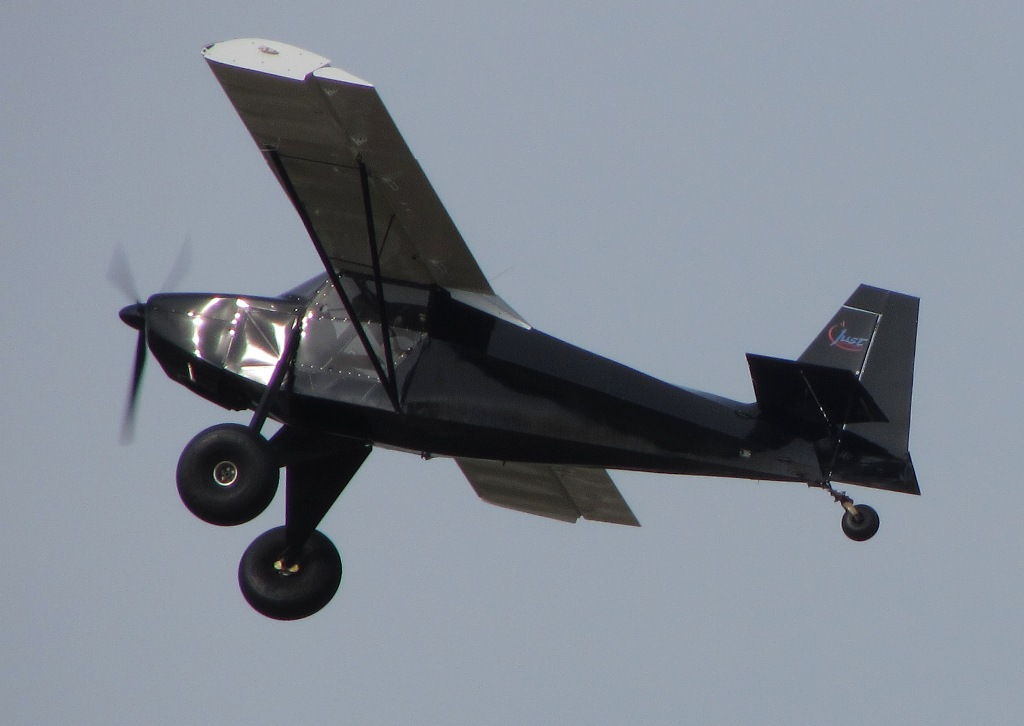
Just Superstol

Just Aircraft LLC is an American aircraft manufacturer based in Walhalla, South Carolina and founded by Troy Woodland in 2002. The company specializes in the design and manufacture of STOL light aircraft in the form of kits for amateur construction and complete ready-to-fly light-sport aircraft.

Just Aircraft is a limited liability company.

Woodland had worked at Flying K Enterprises, the manufacturer of the Flying K Sky Raider, but left to start his own company to market his own designs, partnering with investor Gary Schmitt. The company collaborated with the British company Escapade Aircraft in the design of the Escapade. Woodland next designed the Just Highlander, a development of the Escapade incorporating a larger wing mounting high-lift devices, a larger fin and elevators, balanced tail control surfaces and a strengthened conventional undercarriage. The Just Superstol is a further development of the same line with an emphasis on STOL performance onto unprepared surfaces.

In 2004 the company relocated to Walhalla, South Carolina. By 2013 the Highlander outsold the Escapade line by 10:1, with about one third of sales being outside the US.

== Aircraft ==
Summary of aircraft built by Just Aircraft
Model name	First flight	Number built	Type
Just Escapade	22 February 2003	230 kits (2010)	Two seat kit aircraft
Just Highlander		80 kits (2010)	Two seat kit aircraft
Just Superstol			Two seat STOL kit aircraft
