= Rotor Flight Dynamics Dominator =

Dominator
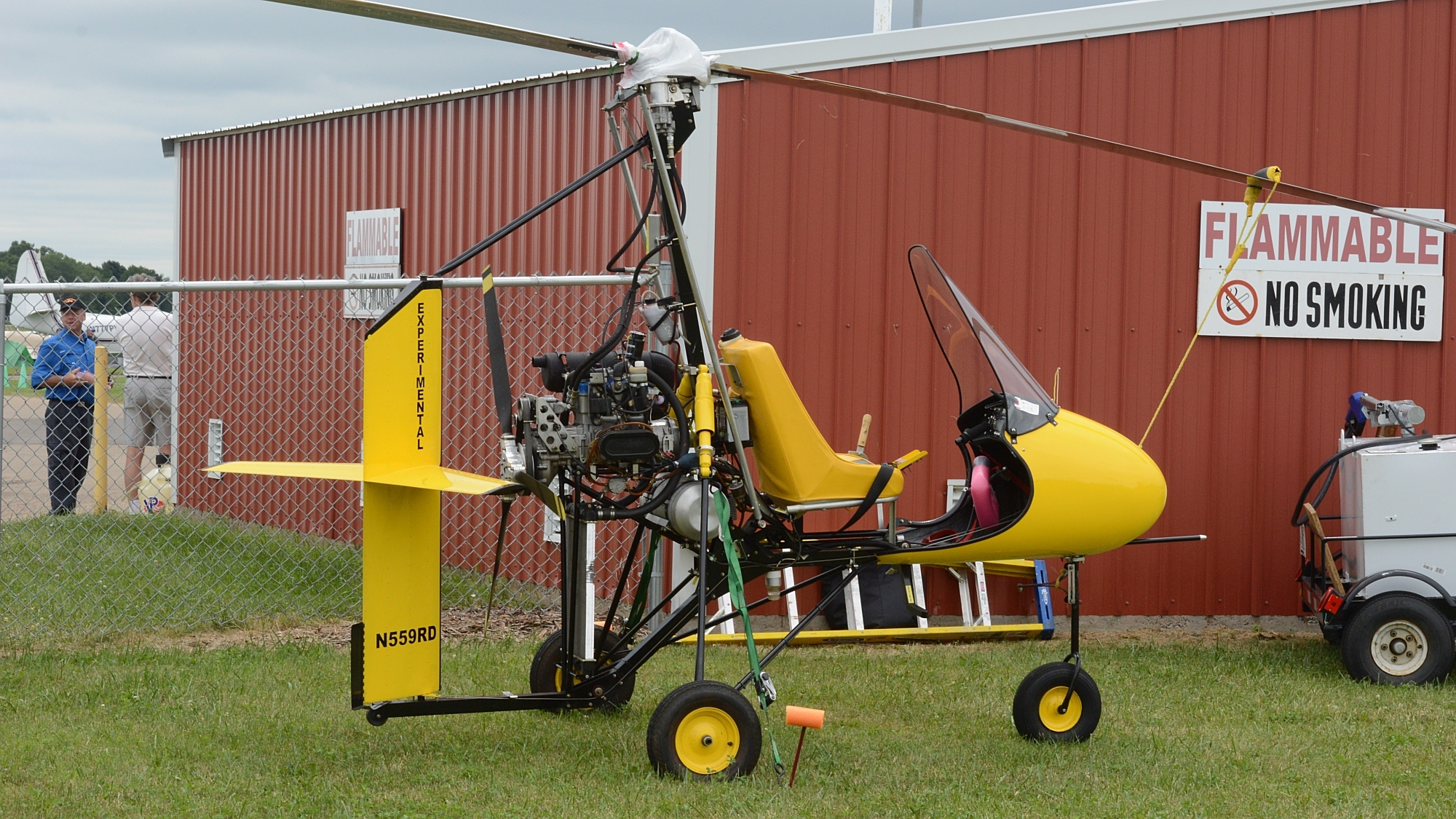

General information
- Type: Autogyro
- National origin: United States
- Manufacturer: Rotor Flight Dynamics
- Designer: Ernie Boyette

The Rotor Flight Dynamics Dominator is an American autogyro designed by Ernie Boyette of Rotor Flight Dynamics of Wimauma, Florida, and made available in the form of plans and kits for amateur construction.

== Design and development ==
The Dominator is an open frame autogyro, constructed of bolted aluminium tubing and powered by a 52 hp (39 kW) Rotax 503 engine with a pusher propeller. The Dominator has both a single-seat and tandem two-seat variants. It was one of the first autogyros to use a high tailplane to reduce dynamic and aerodynamic torque. The Dominator holds the official world altitude record in its class, at 24,463 ft (7,456 m).

== Variants ==
Dominator I
Single-seat variant powered by a 52 hp (39 kW) Rotax 503 engine. 35 flying by 1998.
Dominator Tandem
Two-seat variant powered by a 115 hp (86 kW) Rotax 914, 115 hp (86 kW) Subaru EA-81 automotive conversion, or similar engine. Four flying by 1998.
Rotor Flight Dynamics Dominator UltraWhite
A lightweight version of the Dominator without any fairing and powered by a 50 hp (37 kW) Rotax 503 two-stroke.
Rotor Flight Dynamics Dominator Single
Single-seat variant powered by a 50 hp (37 kW) Rotax 503 two-stroke or a 115 hp (86 kW) Subaru EA-81 four stroke automotive conversion with an Autoflight gearbox.

== Specifications (Dominator I) ==
Data from World Directory of Leisure Aviation 2004/2005

General characteristics

- Crew: 1
- Empty weight: 331 lb (150 kg)
- Max takeoff weight: 397 lb (180 kg)
- Powerplant: 1 × Rotax 503 inline 2-cylinder two-stroke piston engine, 52 hp (39 kW)

Performance

- Maximum speed: 85 mph (136 km/h, 73 kn)
- Cruise speed: 50 mph (80 km/h, 43 kn)
- Minimum control speed: 12 mph (19 km/h, 10 kn)
- Rate of climb: 790 ft/min (4 m/s)

== See also ==
Related lists

- List of autogyro models
