= Rotor Flight Dynamics =

American homebuilt aircraft manufacturer

Rotor Flight Dynamics Inc
- Company type: Privately held company
- Industry: Aerospace
- Founded: 1986
- Defunct: 2020
- Headquarters: Wimauma, Florida, United States
- Key people: President: Ernie Boyette
- Products: Autogyros

Rotor Flight Dynamics Inc was an American aircraft manufacturer based in Wimauma, Florida and owned by Ernie Boyette. The company was founded in 1986 and specialized in the design and manufacture of autogyros in the form of plans and kits for amateur construction.

The company seems to have gone out of business in 2020.

Boyette started his company to produce his Dragon Wing rotorblade designs. Constructed of bonded aluminium and employing a custom airfoil section, they were first marketed in 1989. He used the money made from that successful venture to fund the development of his Dominator series of autogyro designs.

In 2006 the Rotor Flight Dynamics LFINO (Leap Flight In Normal Operations and pronounced by the designers as "ell if I know"), was displayed at Bensen Days. First flown in February 2006, the innovative design was constructed by Boyette and Dick DeGraw as a technology demonstrator and incorporates an enclosed cabin along with a vertical take-off capability.

== Aircraft ==
Summary of aircraft built by Rotor Flight Dynamics
Model name	First flight	Number built	Type
Rotor Flight Dynamics Dominator			autogyro
Rotor Flight Dynamics LFINO	February 2006	One	autogyro technology demonstrator
