= Aircraft fabric covering =

Material and method used to cover open aircraft structures

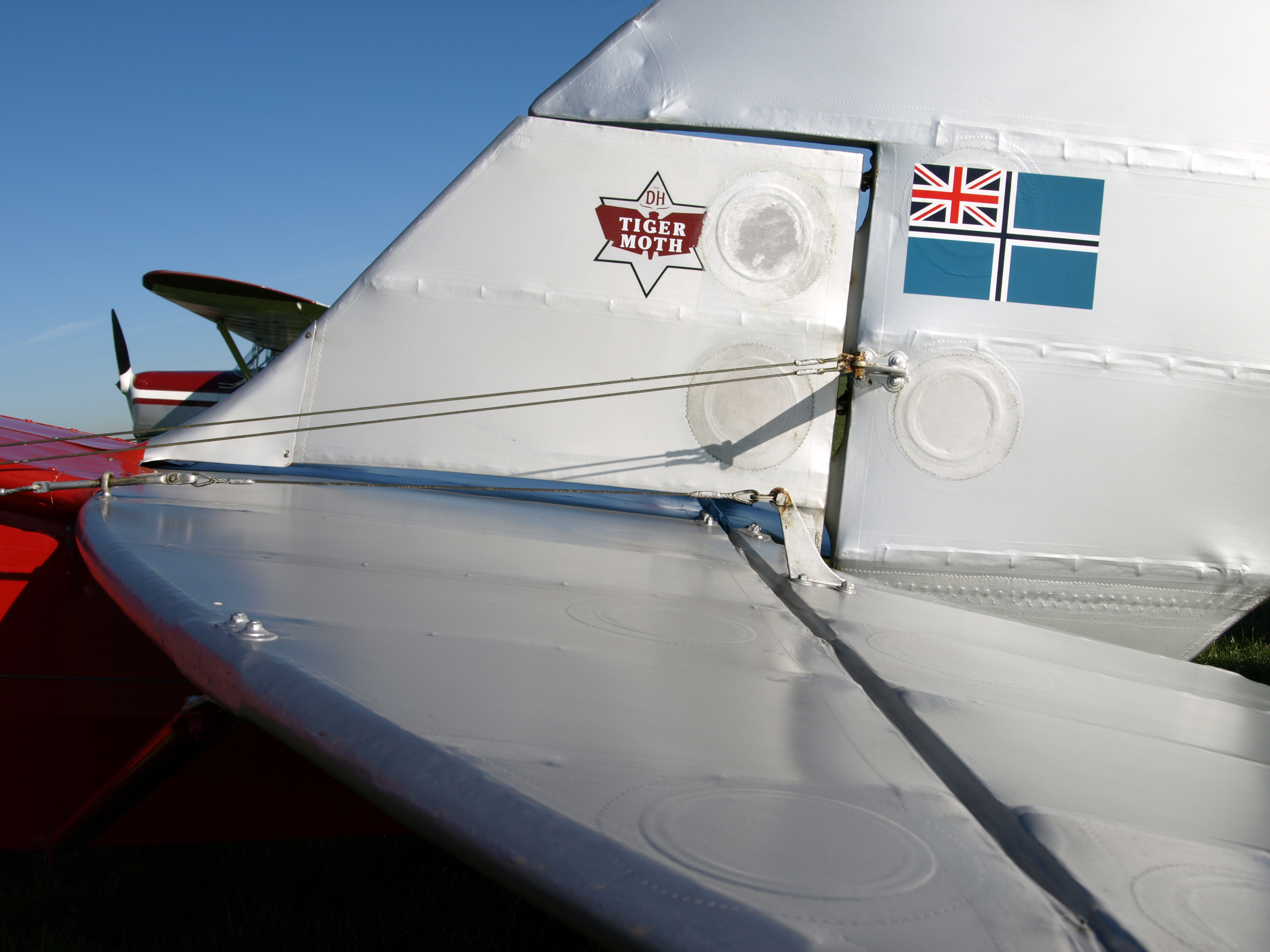
Fabric covering of a de Havilland Tiger Moth showing rib stitching and inspection rings.

Aircraft fabric covering is a term used for both the material used and the process of covering aircraft open structures. It is also used for reinforcing closed plywood structures. The de Havilland Mosquito is an example of this technique, as are the pioneering all-wood monocoque fuselages of certain World War I German aircraft like the LFG Roland C.II in its wrapped Wickelrumpf plywood strip and fabric covering.

Early aircraft used organic materials such as cotton and cellulose nitrate dope; modern fabric-covered designs usually use synthetic materials such as Dacron and butyrate dope for adhesive. Modern methods are often used in the restoration of older types that were originally covered using traditional methods.

== Purpose/requirements ==
The purposes of the fabric covering of an aircraft are:

- To provide a light airproof skin for lifting and control surfaces.
- To provide structural strength to otherwise weak structures.
- To cover other non-lifting parts of an aircraft to reduce drag, sometimes forming a fairing.
- To protect the structure from the elements.

== History ==
=== Early use ===
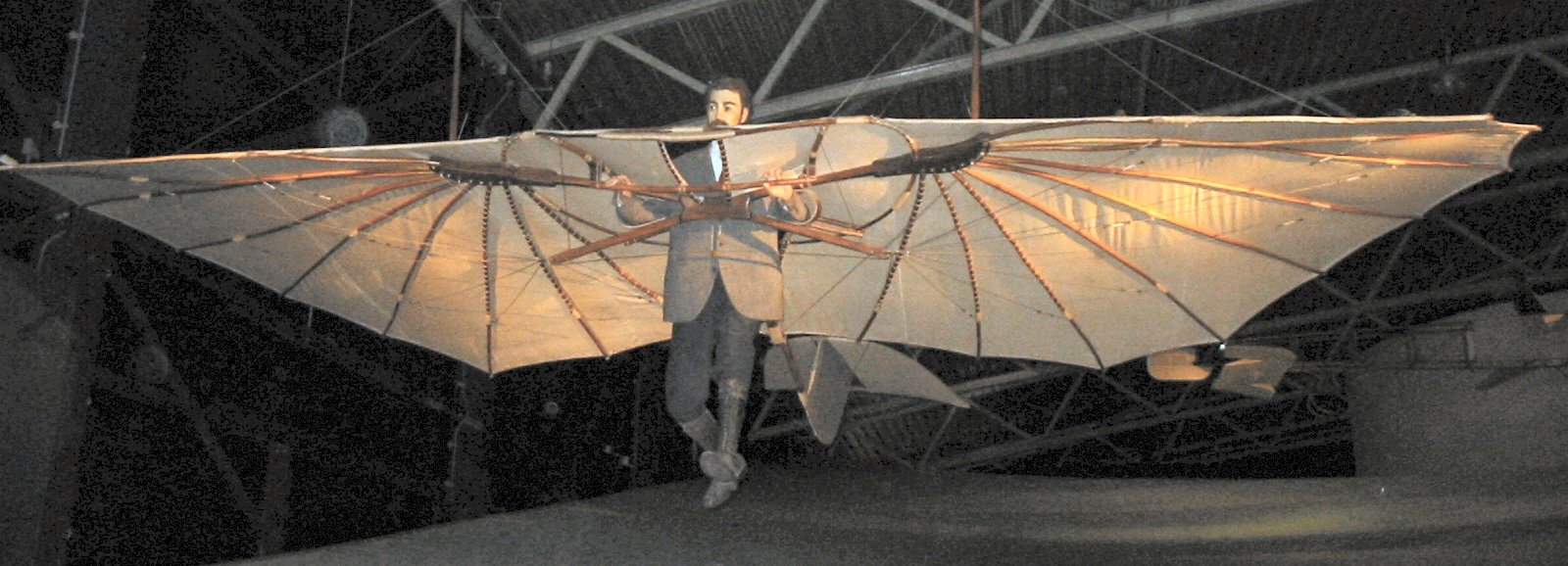
A Lillienthal flying machine replica, Aviodrome

Pioneering aviators such as George Cayley and Otto Lilienthal used cotton-covered flying surfaces for their manned glider designs. The Wright brothers also used cotton to cover their Wright Flyer. Other early aircraft used a variety of fabrics, silk and linen being commonly used. Some early aircraft, such as A.V. Roe's first machines, even used paper as a covering material. Until the development of cellulose based dope in 1911 a variety of methods of finishing the fabric were used. The most popular was the use of rubberised fabrics such as those manufactured by Continental Tyres. Other methods included the use of sago starch. The advent of cellulose dopes such as "Emaillite" was a major step forward in the production of practical aircraft, producing a surface that remained taut (eliminating the need for frequent re-covering of the flying surfaces)

=== World War I/Postwar ===
The air battles of World War I were mainly fought with fabric-covered biplanes that were vulnerable to fire due to the flammable properties of the cloth covering and nitrocellulose dope. National insignia painted on the fabric were often cut from downed aircraft and used as war trophies. The German aircraft designer Hugo Junkers is considered one of the pioneers of metal aircraft; his designs started the move away from fabric covering. The highly flammable mixture of fabric, dope and hydrogen gas was a factor in the demise of the Hindenburg airship.

=== World War II ===
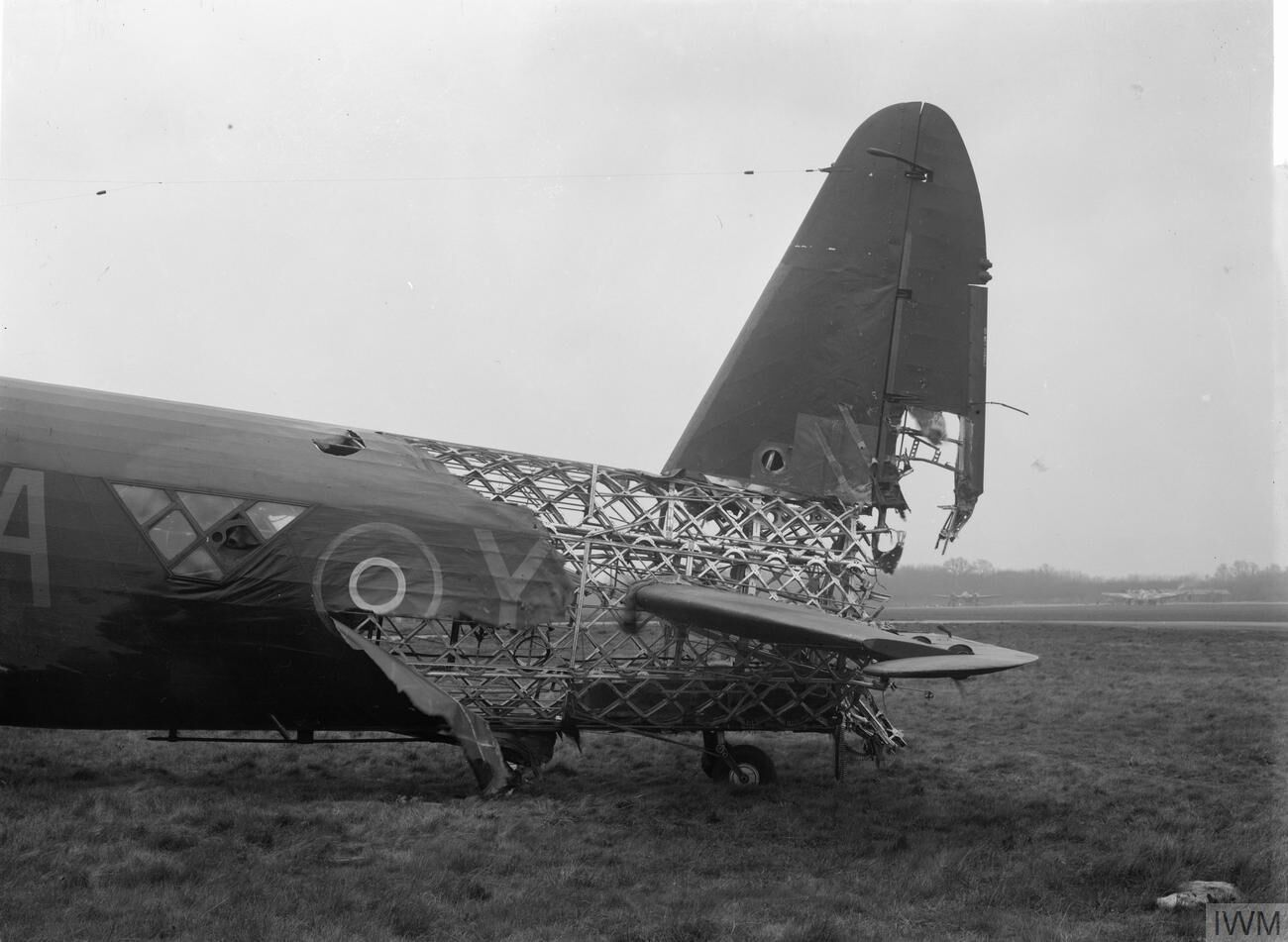
Damaged Vickers Wellington showing burnt and missing fabric covering

By the World War II era many aircraft designs were using metal monocoque structures due to their higher operating airspeeds, although fabric-covered control surfaces were still used on early mark Spitfires and other types. The Hawker Hurricane had a fabric covered fuselage, and they also had fabric covered wings until 1939. Many transports, bombers and trainers still used fabric, although the flammable nitrate dope was replaced with butyrate dope instead, which burns less readily. The Mosquito is an example of a fabric-covered (madapollam) plywood aircraft. The Vickers Wellington used fabric over a geodesic airframe which offered good combat damage resistance.

An interesting case of ingenuity under wartime adversity was the Colditz Cock glider. This homebuilt aircraft, intended as a means of escape, employed prison bedding as its covering material; homemade glue and dope made from boiled millet were also used by the prisoners in its construction.

=== Introduction of modern materials ===
With the development of modern synthetic materials following World War II, cotton fabrics were replaced in civil aircraft applications by polyethylene terephthalate, known by the trade-name Dacron or Ceconite. This new fabric could be glued to the airframe instead of sewn and then heat-shrunk to fit. Grade A cotton would typically last six to seven years when the aircraft was stored outside, whereas Ceconite, which does not rot like cotton, can last over 20 years.

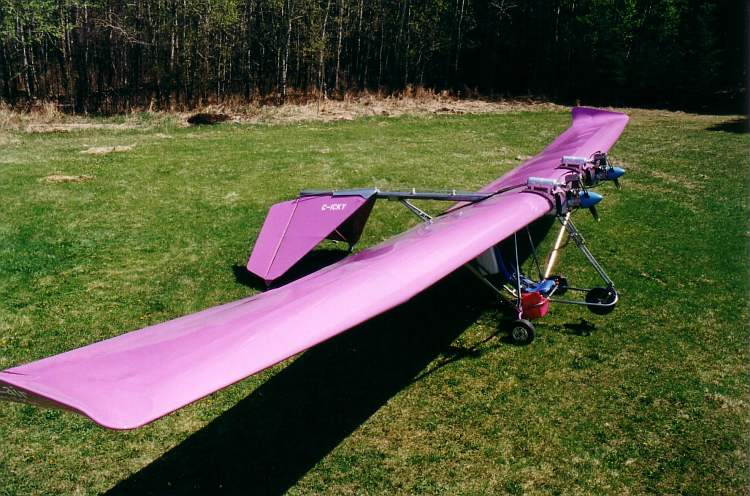
An Ultraflight Lazair covered using Ceconite and the Hipec process.

Early attempts to use these modern fabrics with butyrate dope proved that the dope did not adhere at all and peeled off in sheets. Nitrate dope was resurrected as the initial system of choice instead, although it was supplanted by new materials too.

One fabric system, developed by Ray Stits in the United States and FAA-approved in 1965, is marketed under the brand name Poly-Fiber. This uses three weights of Dacron fabric sold as by the brand name Ceconite, plus fabric glue for attaching to the airframe (Poly-Tak), fabric preparation sealer resin (Poly-Brush) and paint (Poly-Tone). This system is not dope and instead uses vinyl-based chemicals. Ceconite 101 is a certified 3.5 oz/yd^{2} (119 g/m^{2}) fabric while Ceconite 102 is a 3.16 oz/yd^{2} (107 g/m^{2}) fabric. There is also an uncertified light Ceconite of 1.87 oz/yd^{2} (63 g/m^{2}) intended for ultralight aircraft. This method requires physical attachment of the fabric to the airframe in the form of rib-stitching, rivets or capstrips, which are then usually covered with fabric tapes.

In addition to Poly-Fiber, a number of other companies produce covering processes for certified and homebuilt aircraft. Randolph Products and Certified Coatings Products both make butyrate and nitrate-based dopes for use with Dacron fabric.

Superflite and Air-Tech systems use a similar fabric, but the finishes are polyurethane-based products with flex agents added. These finishes produce very high gloss results.

Falconar Avia of Edmonton, Alberta, Canada developed the Hipec system in 1964 for use with Dacron fabric. It uses a special Hipec Sun Barrier that adheres fabric directly to the aircraft structure in one step, eliminating the need for the riveting, rib-stitching and taping used in traditional fabric processes. The final paint is then applied over the sun barrier to complete the process.

Newer systems were developed and distributed by Stewart Systems of Cashmere, Washington and Blue River (Ceconite 7600). These two systems use the same certified dacron materials as other systems, but do not use high volatile organic compounds, using water as a carrier instead, making them safer to use and less environmentally damaging.

Many ultralight aircraft are covered with pre-sewn envelopes of 3.9 oz Dacron that are simply screwed, bolted or laced into place. These are produced in a wide variety of colours and patterns and are commonly flown untreated or with an anti-ultraviolet radiation finish to resist sun damage.

Lanitz Aviation introduced a new process in 2001 manufactured in Germany under the trade name Oratex6000. Oratex has received a European EASA Supplemental Type Certificate (STC), Canadian STCs, and a US STC. Oratex differs from previous systems, which all require the application of many layers of special coatings (many of them toxic) along with the time, skill, equipment and safety precautions necessary to apply them. Oratex6000 is simply glued to the airframe and then shrunk tight and does not require any coatings.

== Covering processes ==
=== Traditional methods ===
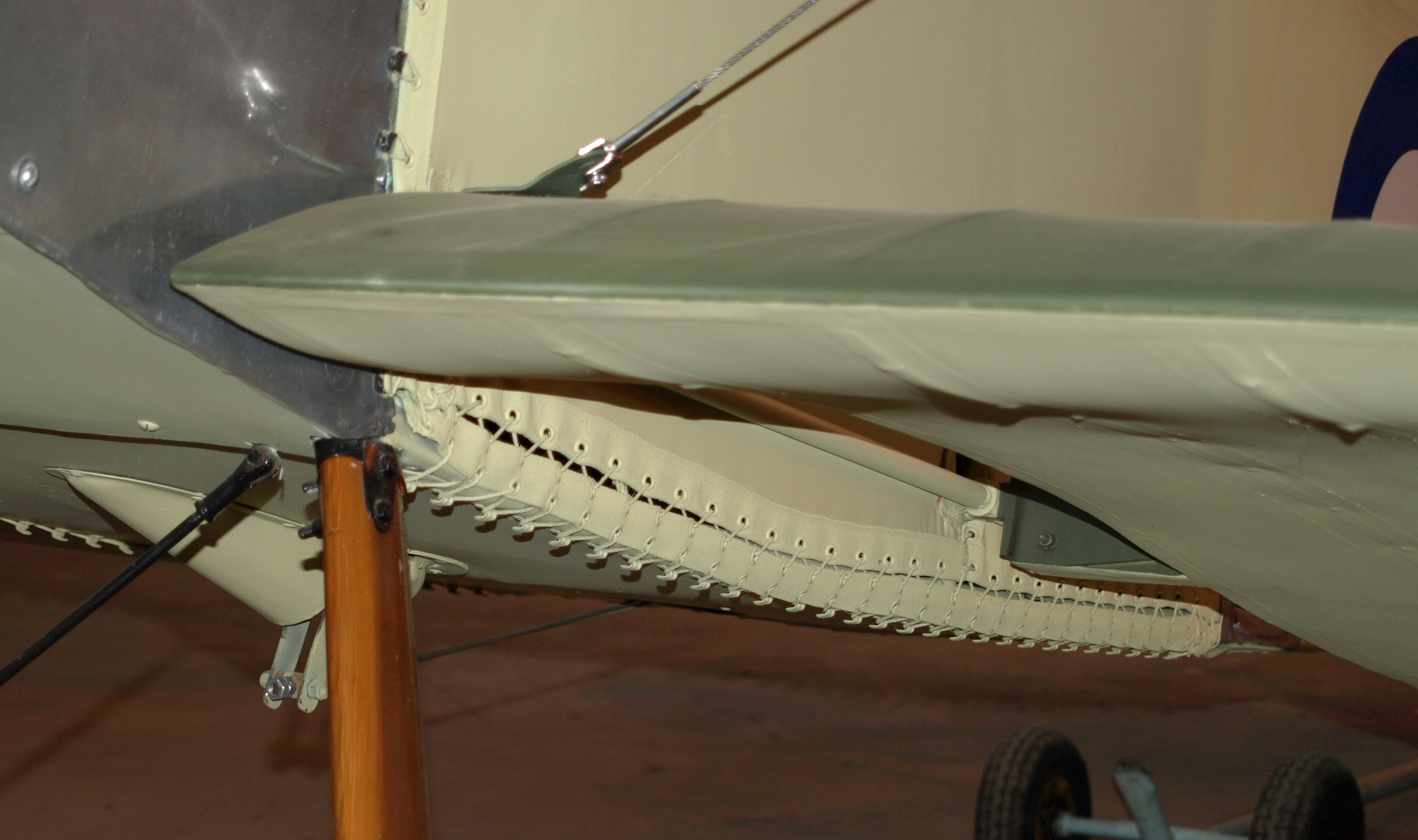
Laced panels and stitched undercambered airfoil of a Sopwith Pup

Traditional covering methods use organic materials, such as cotton. Once the aircraft structure is prepared by sanding, the material is applied using dope as an adhesive. Rib-stitching is used on faster aircraft types and especially on undercambered airfoils to ensure that the fabric follows the aircraft structure. The distance between stitches is reduced in areas affected by the propeller wash. The covering would then be treated with tautening dope to remove wrinkles and increase structural strength, finish coats often containing aluminium powder would serve to protect the surface from ultra-violet light. Large fabric panels of the World War I era aircraft were often laced together through eyelets to ease access to the internal structure for maintenance. Some disadvantages compared to modern methods are the relatively short service life of the covering due to biological effects such as mildew and the labour required to achieve the end result.

=== Modern methods ===
Modern covering methods follow the traditional method with minor differences. Synthetic materials are used, covering is adhered to the structure using dedicated glues. The shrinking process is achieved by applying an electric iron or heat gun. Once the covering is tight, rib-stitching is again used for heavier or faster aircraft. Cosmetic finish coats are usually applied, except in the case of Oratex which normally receives no coatings. A side effect of using modern covering materials on wooden structured aircraft is that due to the much longer life the structure remains covered and un-inspected for much longer time periods, this has resulted in special periodic inspections being mandated by aviation regulatory bodies.

With both methods of covering it is normal for the aircraft to be re-weighed after renewal of the fabric to determine any change in mass and centre of gravity.

== See also ==
- Aircraft dope
- Homebuilt aircraft
- Radio-controlled aircraft, on which either doped-on fabric or prepared iron-on fabric (using heat from a clothes iron for adhesion and shrinkage) can be used for a covering material.
