= Möwe =

Möwe (German for 'gull') or Mowe may refer to:

- Möwe (DJ duo), an Austrian DJ-duo from Vienna
- Mowe, Nigeria, a town in Ogun State
- Mowe Lake, a lake in Delta County, Michigan
- Dittmar HD 153 Motor-Möwe, a 1953 West German light aircraft
- Focke-Wulf A 17 Möwe, a 1920s airliner produced in Germany
- Focke-Wulf A 38 Möwe, a 1930s airliner produced in Germany
- German torpedo boat Möwe, a 1926 torpedo boat built for the German Navy
- Ostfriesische Möwe, a German breed of domestic chicken
- SMS Möwe (1879), a German gunboat
- SMS Möwe (1914), a German commerce raider during World War I
- Möwe, an aircraft in the anime Nausicaä of the Valley of the Wind

== People with the surname ==
- Jenny Mowe (born 1978), American basketball player
- Ray Mowe (1889–1968), American baseball player
