= Focke-Wulf GL 18 =

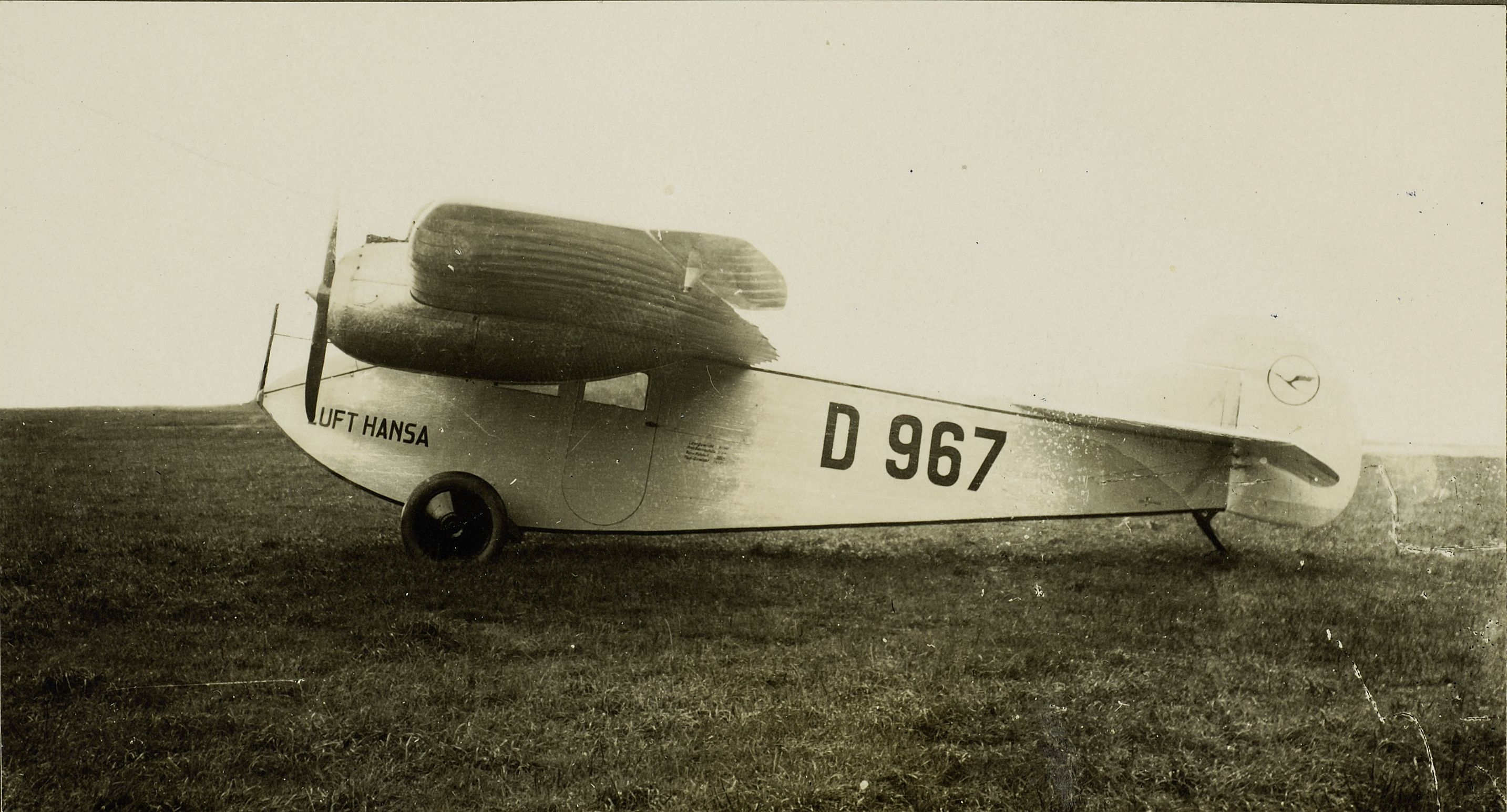

General information
- Type: Light transport monoplane
- National origin: Germany
- Manufacturer: Focke-Wulf
- Primary user: Deutsche Luft Hansa
- Number built: 3 (GL18); 4 (GL22)

History
- First flight: 9 August 1926
- Developed from: Focke-Wulf A 16

The Focke-Wulf GL 18 was a 1920s German light transport monoplane, designed and built by Focke-Wulf.

== Design and development ==
Based on the single-engine Focke-Wulf A 16 with the nose faired over and fitted with two wing-mounted 58 kW (78 hp) Junkers L.1a inline engines, the GL18 had an enclosed cabin for a pilot and four passengers. The GL18 first flew on 9 August 1926 and was used by Deutsche Luft Hansa until 1932. The next aircraft was the GL 18a variant with two Siemens Sh 11 engines which was followed by the GL 18c with two Siemens Sh 12 engines. The 18a and 18b had slightly wider fuselages. In 1927, a modified Siemens Sh 12-engined variant, the GL 22, was produced. It had a deeper fuselage, the engines were mounted underneath the wings and it had a revised landing gear.

== Variants ==
GL18
Twin-engined variant of the Focke-Wulf A 16 with a Junkers L.1a inline engine, one built.
GL18b
Siemens Sh 11-powered variant, one built.
GL18c
Siemens Sh 12-powered variant, one built.
GL22
Revised variant with Siemens Sh 12 engines, four built.

== Specifications (GL 22) ==
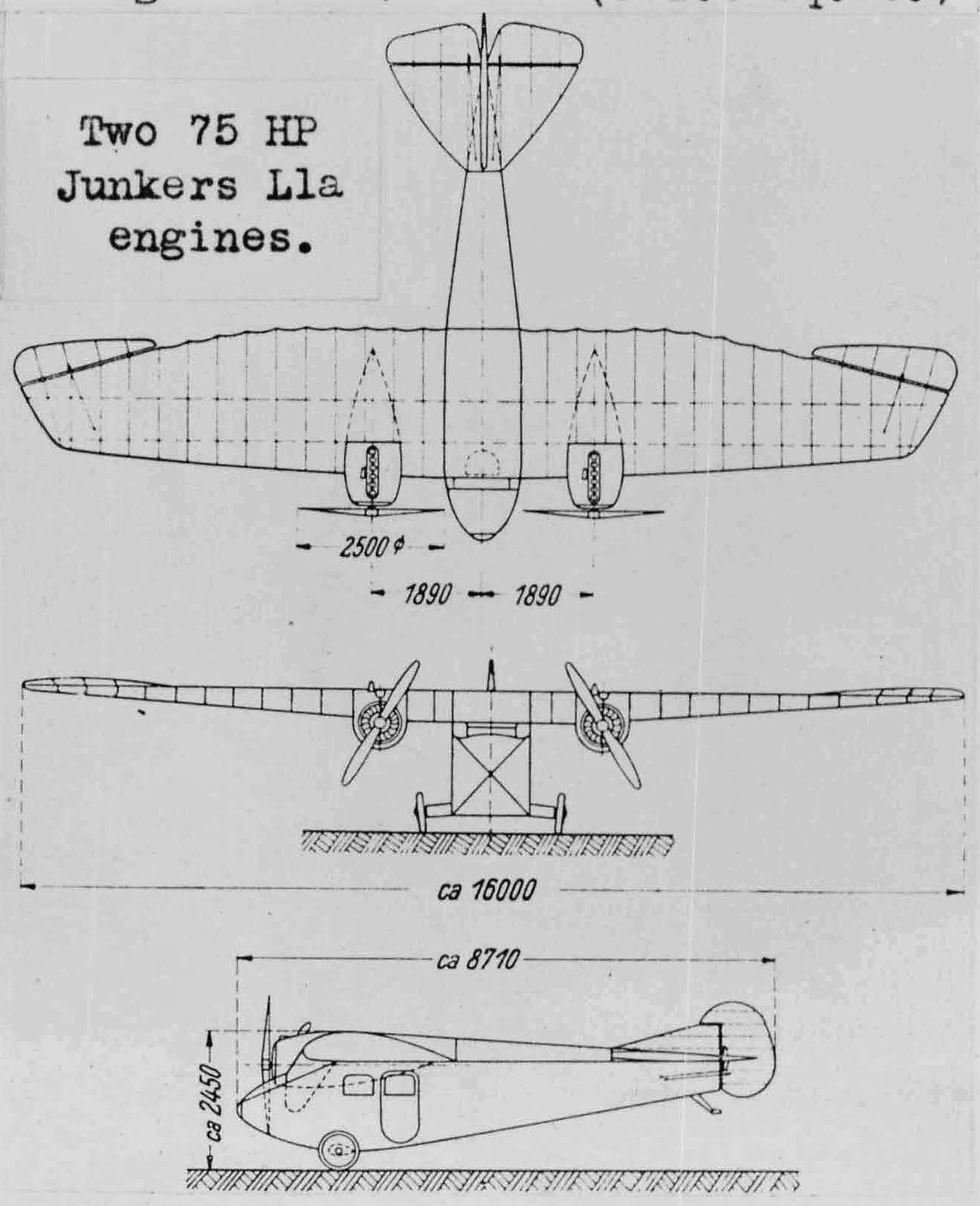
Focke-Wulf GL 18 3 view drawing from NACA Aircraft Circular No.46

Data from The Illustrated Encyclopedia of Aircraft

General characteristics

- Crew: one
- Capacity: four passengers
- Length: 11.00 m (36 ft 1 in)
- Wingspan: 16.00 m (52 ft 6 in)
- Height: 3.00 m (9 ft 10 in)
- Wing area: 32.00 m^{2} (344.46 sq ft)
- Empty weight: 1,180 kg (2,601 lb)
- Gross weight: 1,820 kg (4,013 lb)
- Powerplant: 2 × Siemens Sh 12 radial piston engine. , 93 kW (125 hp) each

Performance

- Maximum speed: 166 km/h (96 mph, 83 kn)
- Range: 900 km (559 mi, 486 nmi)
- Service ceiling: 3,500 m (11,485 ft)
