= Focke-Wulf A 33 Sperber =

A 33 Sperber
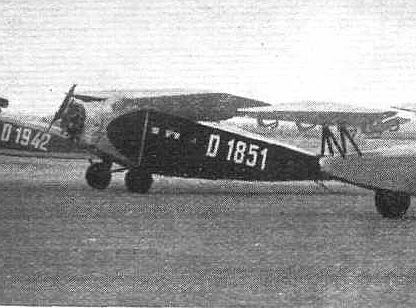

General information
- Type: Airliner
- Manufacturer: Focke-Wulf
- Designer: Paul Klages
- Number built: 3

History
- First flight: 1930

The Focke-Wulf A 33 Sperber (German: "Sparrowhawk") was a small airliner, produced in Germany in the early 1930s. It was a high-wing cantilever monoplane of conventional design, resembling a scaled-down version of the contemporary A 32 design. Only three examples were built, each purchased for air taxi duties with separate German airlines. One eventually briefly joined the fleet of Deutsche Luft Hansa in 1937.

== Specifications ==
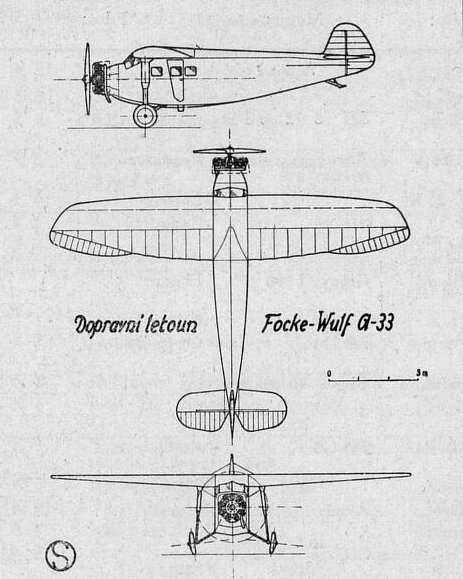
A 33 3-view drawing

General characteristics

- Crew: one pilot
- Capacity: three passengers
- Length: 9.58 m (31 ft 5 in)
- Wingspan: 12.00 m (39 ft 4 in)
- Height: 3.00 m (9 ft 10 in)
- Wing area: 22.0 m^{2} (237 sq ft)
- Empty weight: 670 kg (1,480 lb)
- Gross weight: 1,120 kg (2,470 lb)
- Powerplant: 1 × Walter Mars I , 108 kW (145 hp)

Performance

- Maximum speed: 165 km/h (102 mph, 89 kn)
- Range: 550 km (340 mi, 300 nmi)
- Service ceiling: 3,000 m (9,840 ft)
