= Focke-Wulf A 38 Möwe =

A 38 Möwe
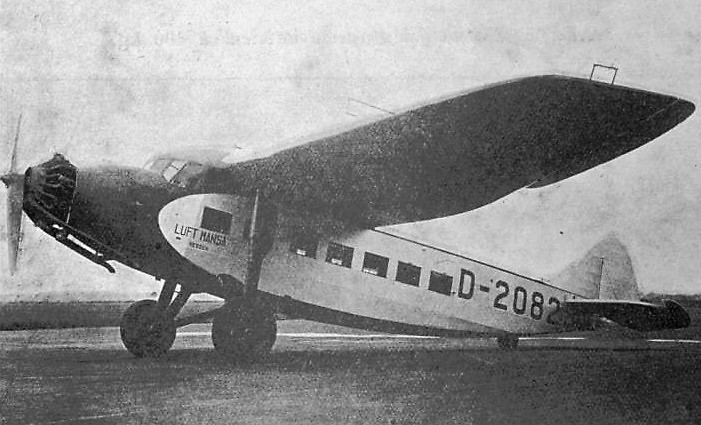

General information
- Type: Airliner
- Manufacturer: Focke-Wulf
- Designer: Wilhelm Bansemir
- Primary user: Deutsche Luft Hansa
- Number built: 4

History
- First flight: 1931

The Focke-Wulf A 38 Möwe (German: "Gull") was an airliner, produced in Germany in the early 1930s. It was a final development of the family of designs that commenced with the A 17 in 1927. The A 38 used the same high-mounted, cantilever wing as the A 29, but mated this to an all-new fuselage design with enclosed seating for ten passengers and three crew. Unlike earlier members of the family, the flight deck was not joined to the cabin, separated now by a lavatory and baggage compartment. The main undercarriage was strengthened and the mainwheels fitted with brakes, while the tailskid was replaced with a tailwheel. All four A 38s were originally fitted with Siemens- or Gnome et Rhône-built Bristol Jupiter engines (although the BMW VI had been offered as an option), but in April 1933, all aircraft were refitted with Siemens Sh 20 powerplants. By mid-1934, they had been relegated to training duties.

== Specifications ==
General characteristics

- Crew: three - two pilots and a radio operator
- Capacity: ten passengers
- Length: 15.40 m (50 ft 6 in)
- Wingspan: 20.00 m (65 ft 7 in)
- Height: 5.30 m (17 ft 5 in)
- Wing area: 62.5 m^{2} (673 sq ft)
- Empty weight: 2,700 kg (5,940 lb)
- Gross weight: 4,400 kg (9,680 lb)
- Powerplant: 1 × Siemens-built Bristol Jupiter VI , 370 kW (500 hp)

Performance

- Maximum speed: 204 km/h (126 mph, 109 kn)
- Range: 750 km (470 mi, 410 nmi)
- Service ceiling: 3,100 m (10,200 ft)
- Rate of climb: 2.1 m/s (420 ft/min)
