= Focke-Wulf F 19 Ente =

German aircraft

F 19 Ente
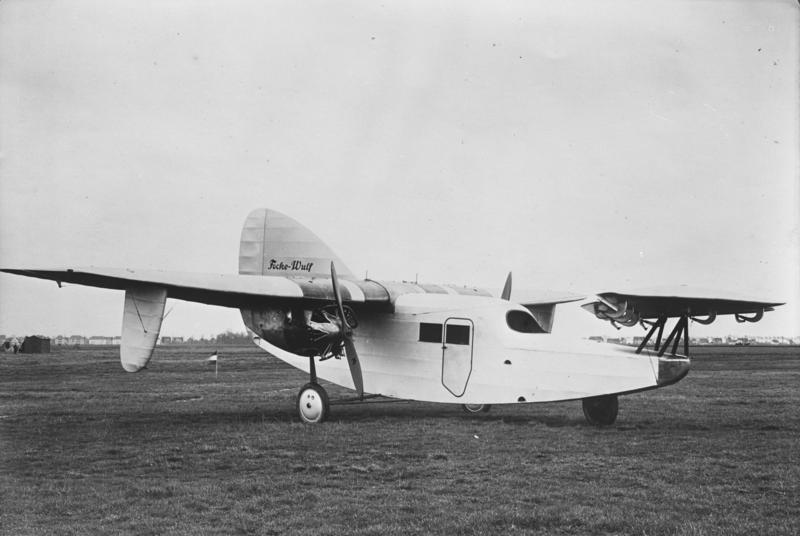

General information
- Type: Civil utility aircraft
- Manufacturer: Focke-Wulf
- Number built: 2

History
- First flight: 2 September 1927
- Developed into: Focke-Wulf Fw 42

The Focke-Wulf F 19 Ente (German: "Duck") was an experimental canard aircraft designed and produced by the German aircraft manufacturer Focke-Wulf.

== Development and design ==
The F 19 Ente was a high-wing monoplane with a canard layout and fixed tricycle undercarriage. While representing an effective reversal of the orthodox arrangement of positioning the tail unit aft of the wings, the general configuration of the aircraft actually dated back to the pioneering days of European aviation, prior to the First World War. One of the Focke-Wulf company's earliest endeavours was such an aircraft. While such work was halted by war time needs, the company continued to be interested in the concept.

During 1925, Focke-Wulf approached the Deutsche Luftfahrtforschungsanstalt (DVL) with its proposal to build such an aircraft. An extensive series of model tests were conducted prior to work commencing on the construction of the first aircraft, which was undertaken at the Göttingen Experimental Institute. Exhaustive windtunnel testing was conducted at the prior to the construction of the second aircraft, the completion of which was delayed by a fire that burnt its half-complete fuselage in 1929.

The untraditional arrangement of the aircraft presented several benefits over conventional aircraft; one being that the front stabilizer, which was set at a slightly greater angle of attack, would stall some moments before the rear-mounted main wing, which theoretically made the Ente virtually stall-proof without the need to incorporate any special devices to achieve this. The aircraft's center of gravity was less forward, permitting more effective braking without risking capsizing, which in turn shortened the landing distance required. Furthermore, the arrangement was speculated to provide greater safety to its occupants during landing than that of conventional aircraft. This configuration was reportedly easier for the pilot to judge the aircraft's altitude and to observe the disposition of the elevator.

One key advantage was, in place of the traditional rear-positioned horizontal surface, which generated drag without producing any useful lift, the forward wing and elevator combined produced a greater amount of lift than that of the main wing. More so, relatively strong directional control could be exerted without incurring additional drag. The avoidance of non-lift generating surfaces bolstered the aircraft's efficiency, speed, and climb; the aircraft was reportedly capable of performance comparable to that of the best conventional commercial aircraft available at that time.

Lateral control was achieved in the conventional manner via the ailerons on the main wing, while vertical control was effected by a pair of narrow elevator flaps that were attached to the trailing edge of the forward wing. The aircraft was trimmed by adjusting the angle of the forward wing, which could only be adjusted while on the ground. Both the fin and rudder were above and aft of the main wing; the fin was unusually large in order to prevent instances of yawing. Another pair of vertical stabilizing surfaces were present underneath the main wing for the same reason. Directional control could also be achieved by tilting the forward wing about the aircraft's longitudinal axis, a method that was experimented with late on in the aircraft' flight test programme. The three conventional controls were operated by a wheel control column and rudder bar via a series of rods and cables, while a separate hand wheel was used to tilt the forward wing.

The main wing of the aircraft featured similar dimensions and construction to that of Focke-Wulf's earlier commercial aircraft. Specifically, it was a high-wing cantilever monoplane that had a relatively thick profile, a gentle dihedral, and tips that were shaped to bolster the aircraft's lateral stability. Structurally, both the main and forward wings used a four-member plywood box girder with leading edge and trailing edge formers. The forward wing was supported by a series of steel tubes within the fuselage. The exterior of the wing was covered with a mixture of plywood and fabric.

The aircraft's cabin was formed from an elevated portion of the fuselage, which started just forward of the main wing; this cabin could seat up to three passengers and could be accessed via a door on the righthand side. A separate cockpit, forward of the cabin, was where the pilot was seated. The fuselage's framework was composed of welded steel tubing, which was largely covered with fabric with a few areas of light metal and plywood. The main undercarriage, which was aft of the aircraft's centre of gravity, consisted of two separate parts, each with two hinged arms attached to the base of the fuselage and a shock-absorbing strut that was attached to the underside of the engine nacelle. The rear wheels were fitted with brakes that were actuated via compact pedals on the rudder bar. The wheels under the main wing were supported on divided axles.

Power was provided by a pair of Siemens Sh 14 seven-cylinder engines, capable of generating up to 110 hp. These engines were suspended from the main wing using engine bearers composed of welded steel tubing; the nacelles were streamlined with metal sheathing. Aft of the engines were fireproof bulkheads. Fuel was housed in a pair of tanks within the leading edge of the wing; it was supplied to the engines using gravity. The two oil tanks were also located in the leading edge of the wing.

== Operational history ==
On 2 September 1927, the first aircraft performed its maiden flight. Early flight testing yielded encouraging results. Its career would be relatively short, however, as the aircraft was destroyed on 29 September during a demonstration of single-engine flight, the loss being attributed to a control rod that had broken mid-flight. Focke-Wulf co-founder Georg Wulf was killed in the crash; his loss was a considerable hindrance for the project and the company alike. It was determined that the accident had not been a result of any fundamental design error; accordingly, it was decided to continue work on the project.

A second aircraft (D-1960) was built and made its first flight during the latter half of 1930. There were relatively few design alterations made between the first and second aircraft, save for some structural improvements. It proved to be satisfactory, to the extent that it completed type tests that were indicative of the aircraft's full acceptance, even for the carriage of passengers.

This aircraft was dispatched on a promotional tour around Europe during the following year; it visited Denmark, Sweden, the Netherlands, Belgium, and the UK. On 7 November 1931, it was demonstrated at Hanworth Air Park, flown by Focke-Wulf chief pilot Cornelius Edzard.

Following the end of flight testing, the second aircraft was put on static display at the Deutsche Luftfahrtsammlung in Berlin. It was here that it was destroyed during an Allied air raid in 1943.

== Specifications ==

Data from National Advisory Committee for Aeronautics

General characteristics

- Crew: one pilot
- Capacity: three passengers
- Length: 10.53 m (34 ft 7 in)
- Wingspan: 10.00 m (32 ft 9 in)
- Height: 4.15 m (13 ft 7 in)
- Wing area: 29.5 m^{2} (318 sq ft)
- Empty weight: 1,175 kg (2,590 lb)
- Gross weight: 1,650 kg (3,638 lb)
- Powerplant: 2 × Siemens Sh 14 , 82 kW (110 hp) each

Performance

- Maximum speed: 142 km/h (88 mph, 76 kn)
- Service ceiling: 3,000 m (9,840 ft)

== Bibliography ==
- Taylor, Michael J. H. (1989). Jane's Encyclopedia of Aviation. London, UK: Studio Editions. p. 395.
- World Aircraft Information Files. London, UK: Bright Star Publishing. pp. File 894 Sheet 29.
- "Focke-wulf F 19a "ente" Commercial Airplane (german) : a Tail-first High-wing Monoplane" National Advisory Committee for Aeronautics, 1 January 1931. NACA-AC-132, 93R19550.
