= Focke-Wulf Fw 44 Stieglitz =

1932 general aviation aircraft family by Focke-Wulf

Fw 44 Stieglitz
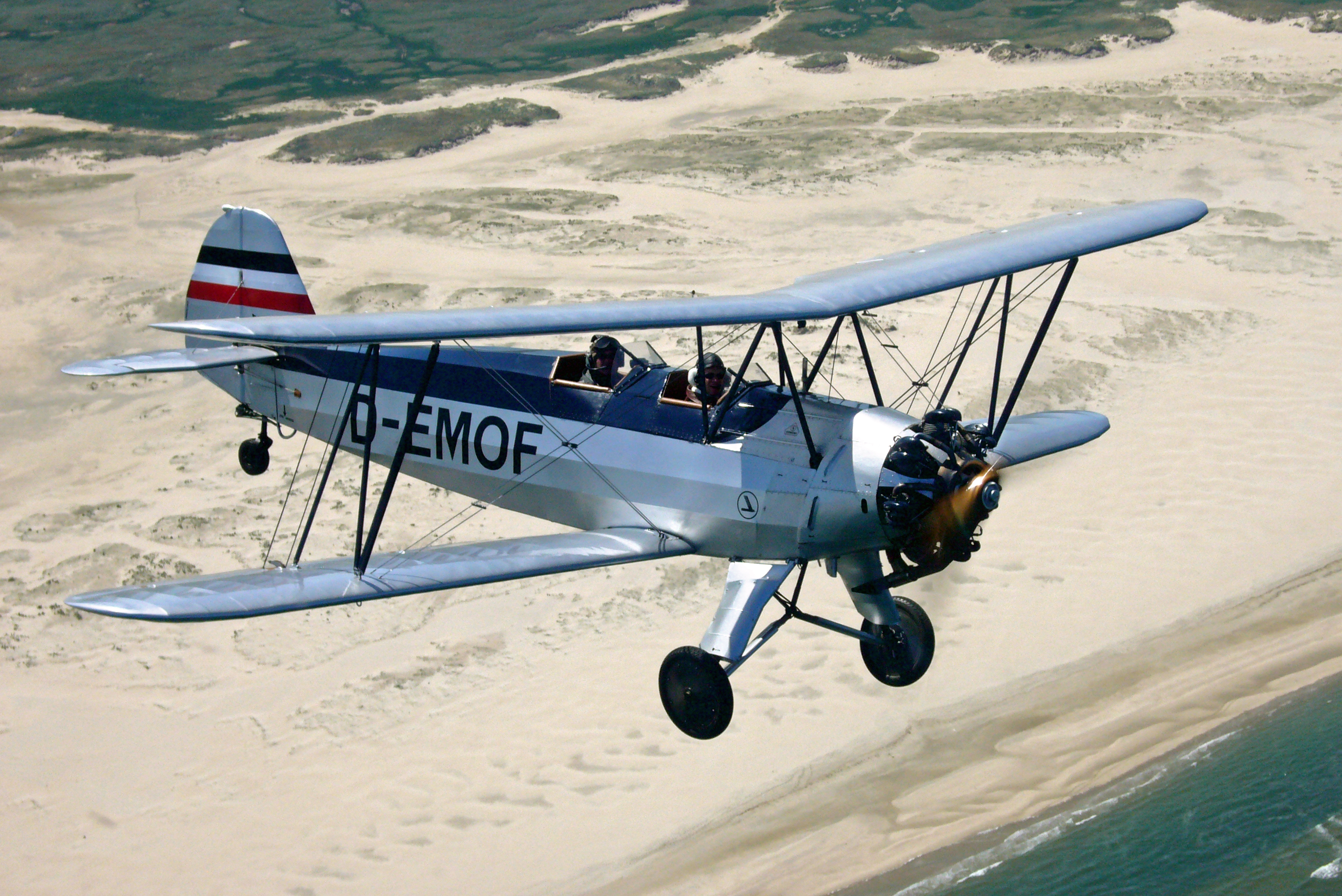
- A Focke-Wulf Fw 44J in 2008

General information
- Type: Biplane trainer
- National origin: Germany
- Manufacturer: Focke-Wulf
- Built by: FMA

History
- First flight: Late summer 1932

The Focke-Wulf Fw 44 Stieglitz (Goldfinch) is a twin-seat biplane designed and produced by the German aircraft manufacturer Focke-Wulf. It was the company's first major international success.

The Fw 44 had a relatively conventional layout for a biplane, possessing a pair of open cockpits that were arranged in tandem; both cockpits were equipped with flight controls and instrumentation. The aircraft had straight untapered wings, fixed tailwheel landing gear, and was typically powered by a Siemens-Halske Sh 14 radial engine. It was furnished with ailerons on both upper and lower wings, but did not use flaps. The design team was headed by Kurt Tank. Intended for use as a pilot training and sports aircraft, the first prototype conducted its maiden flight in the latter half of 1932; while initially proving to be troublesome, remedial modifications and design tweaks quickly adapted the Fw 44 into a suitable aircraft for performing aerobatic manoeuvres, a feat which numerous noted pilots took advantage of.

The aircraft quickly garnered substantial orders from flight schools and flying clubs, both in Germany and abroad. The rate of orders was such that not only did Focke-Wulf establish a second factory but multiple licences were issued to other companies, leading to the Fw 44 being produced in several other countries. The Fw 44C had been considered to be the definitive version of the aircraft, it was powered by a Siemens-Halske Sh 14 radial engine. On several occasions, the type saw key military use; the Republic of China Air Force had their aircraft adapted for frontline combat during the Second Sino-Japanese War. The Luftwaffe operated numerous Fw 44s, both before and during the Second World War.

== Design and development ==
During the mid-1920s, the recently formed German aircraft manufacturer Focke-Wulf commenced limited production of their first civil-orientated aircraft, such as the Focke-Wulf A 16. In 1931, the company benefitted from two key events, the merger of rival aircraft manufacturer Albatros Flugzeugwerke with Focke-Wulf and the arrival of the capable aeronautical engineer Kurt Tank as the leader of the firm's design department. In this capacity, Tank played a key role in the development of what would become the Fw 44, which commenced that same year.

The Fw 44 was a single-bay strut-and-wire-braced twin-seat biplane intended for use as a primary trainer and sporting aircraft. It had equal span wings which had slight sweepback, stagger, and dihedral. The lower wings attached directly to the bottom of the fuselage, the upper wings were connected to the upper fuselage via struts, and a set of N-shaped struts ran between the upper and lower wings on either side of the aircraft. Wood was used for the wing's structural members, such as pinewood spars and ribs; a combination of fabric and plywood was used to cover the wing. The structure of the fuselage comprised welded steel tubing; metal panels covered the forward fuselage while a fabric covering was used for elements aft of the rear cockpit.

The tail unit featured mixed construction, being covered with both fabric and plywood; the angle of incidence was adjustable mid-flight. To reduce the risk of a fire within the engine bay, a bulkhead composed of duralumin was present behind the tubular engine mount. The fuselage contained two fuel tanks, the lower of which was used during inverted flight; both tanks were forward of the bulkhead, as was a third tank containing lubricating oil. Both of the aircraft's two cockpits, which were open, were compatible with seat-type parachutes. Just aft of the rear cockpit was a luggage locker that was accessed by folding down the seat.

During late summer 1932, the first prototype performed its maiden flight. Early test flights were troubled by a range of technical issues, compelling a detailed redesign of the aircraft. Following extensive modifications and testing, it was determined that the redesigned aircraft not only possessed favourable flight characteristics but was also capable of withstanding considerable stresses; these qualities proved to be quite beneficial for conducting aerobatic manoeuvres. Several noted pilots opted to perform aerial displays using the type, such as Gerd Achgelis, Enrst Edet, and Emil Kopf, the latter's aircraft bore the registration D-EMIL.

Much of the early demand for the type came from flight schools and flying clubs; the order numbers were such that Focke-Wulf was able to establish a second factory to produce the type. Customers were not only confined to the German market; numerous nations in South America, Europe, and Asia would purchase the type, some opting to establish local production of the Fw 44 in order to meet their needs. Multiple variants of the aircraft were developed, many of which were for these export customers.

The Fw 44B was the second production version of the aircraft; it was powered by an Argus As 8 four-cylinder inverted inline air-cooled engine, capable of producing up to 90 kW (120 hp). The cowling for this engine gave the plane a more slender and aerodynamic nose. The definitive version of the aircraft was the Fw 44C, which was powered by a Siemens-Halske Sh 14 radial engine instead.

The last series version was the Fw 44J, which was sold or built under license in several countries around the world.

== Operational history ==
Nineteen Fw 44s (Twelve Fw 44Fs and seven Fw 44Js) were purchased by the provincial government of Canton (Guangdong) in 1935–36, for use by its own air force. The Canton Air Force was incorporated into the main Nationalist Air Force in July 1936, as Canton lost its independence. These were modified for combat missions and participated in the early stage of the Second Sino-Japanese War, all are believed to have been lost in action.

Many Fw 44Cs were operated by the Luftwaffe; this included during the Second World War, with the Flugzeugführerschulen and one or two Flugkriegsschulen.

== Variants ==
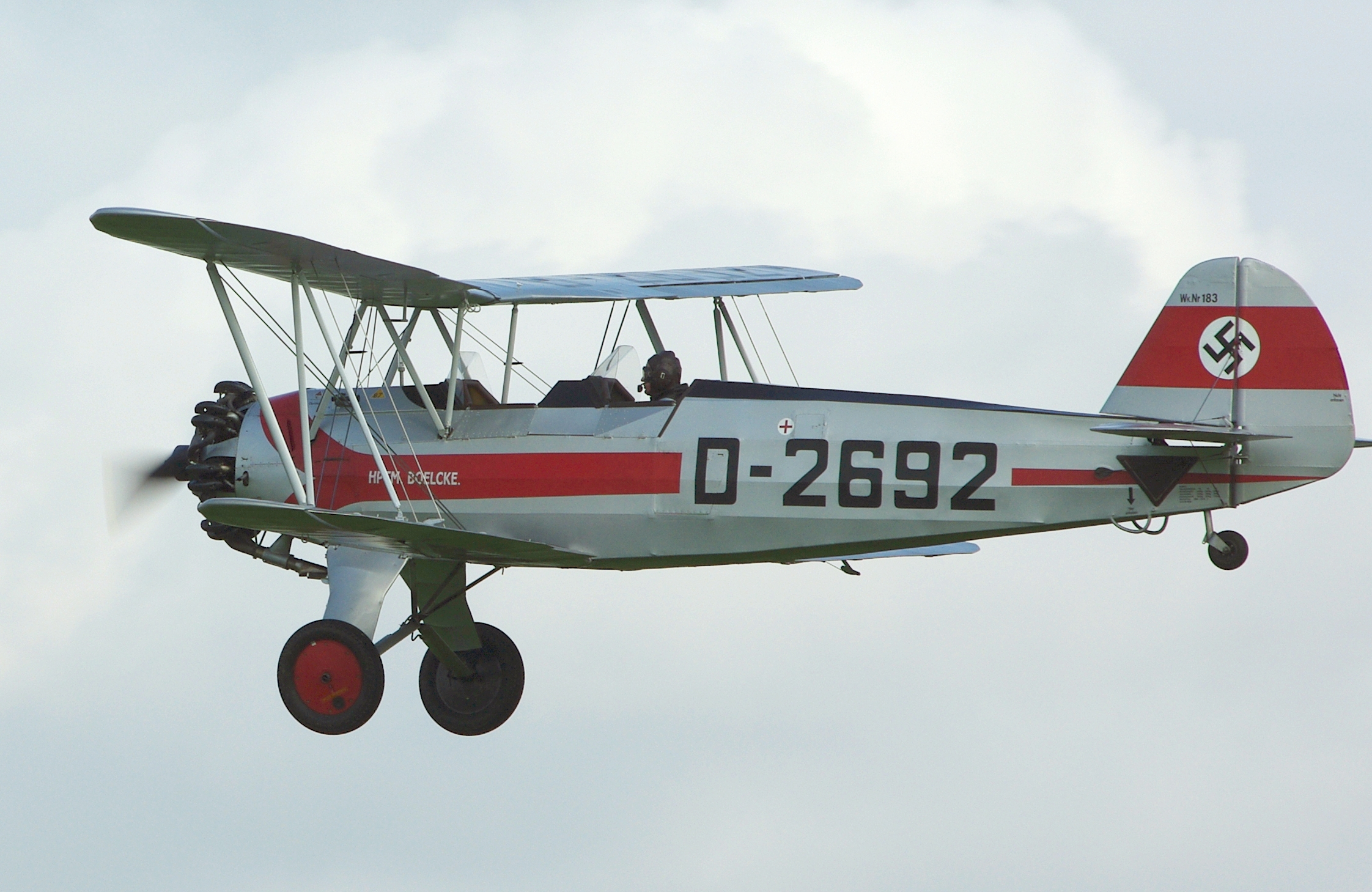
Fw 44J G-STIG at Old Warden 2008

Fw 44B
Fw 44C
Main production version with minor equipment changes, powered by a seven-cylinder Siemens-Halske Sh 14a radial piston engine.
Fw 44D
Fw 44E
Fw 44F
Fw 44J
Final production model, powered by a seven-cylinder Siemens-Halske Sh 14a radial piston engine.
I1AvN
Fw 44J produced under license in Brazil by Fábrica do Galeão.

=== I.Ae. 23 ===
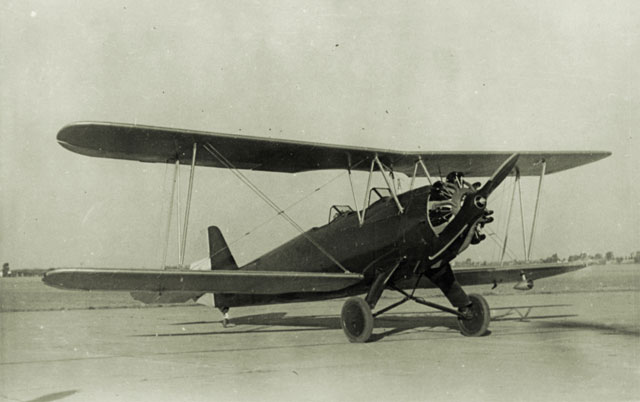
I.Ae. 23, the Argentinian "Wooden Focke-Wulf"

Between 1937 and 1942 the Fábrica Militar de Aviones (FMA) of Argentina had built 190 units of the FW-44J Stieglitz. It was powered by a domestically built version of the Siemens Bramo Sh-14 engine called the I. Ae. Sh-14. The Fw 44Js were destined for the Argentine Military Aviation School and for numerous aero clubs for use as training aircraft.

In 1944, the Instituto Aerotécnico received the request to experiment with the construction of the Fw 44J, but using purely national woods instead of importing them, following the pattern initiated by the development of the I.Ae. 22 "DL" trainer. The project was named I.Ae. 23. It was known as "Wooden Focke-Wulf" (Focke-Wulf de Madera in Spanish). The I.Ae. 23 flew for the first time on July 7, 1945. The plane was used for training and aerobatics. It was configured with a Kodak photo gun. Despite its success, only one was built, as its design was surpassed by other machines of British origin that were acquired in 1946.

== Operators ==
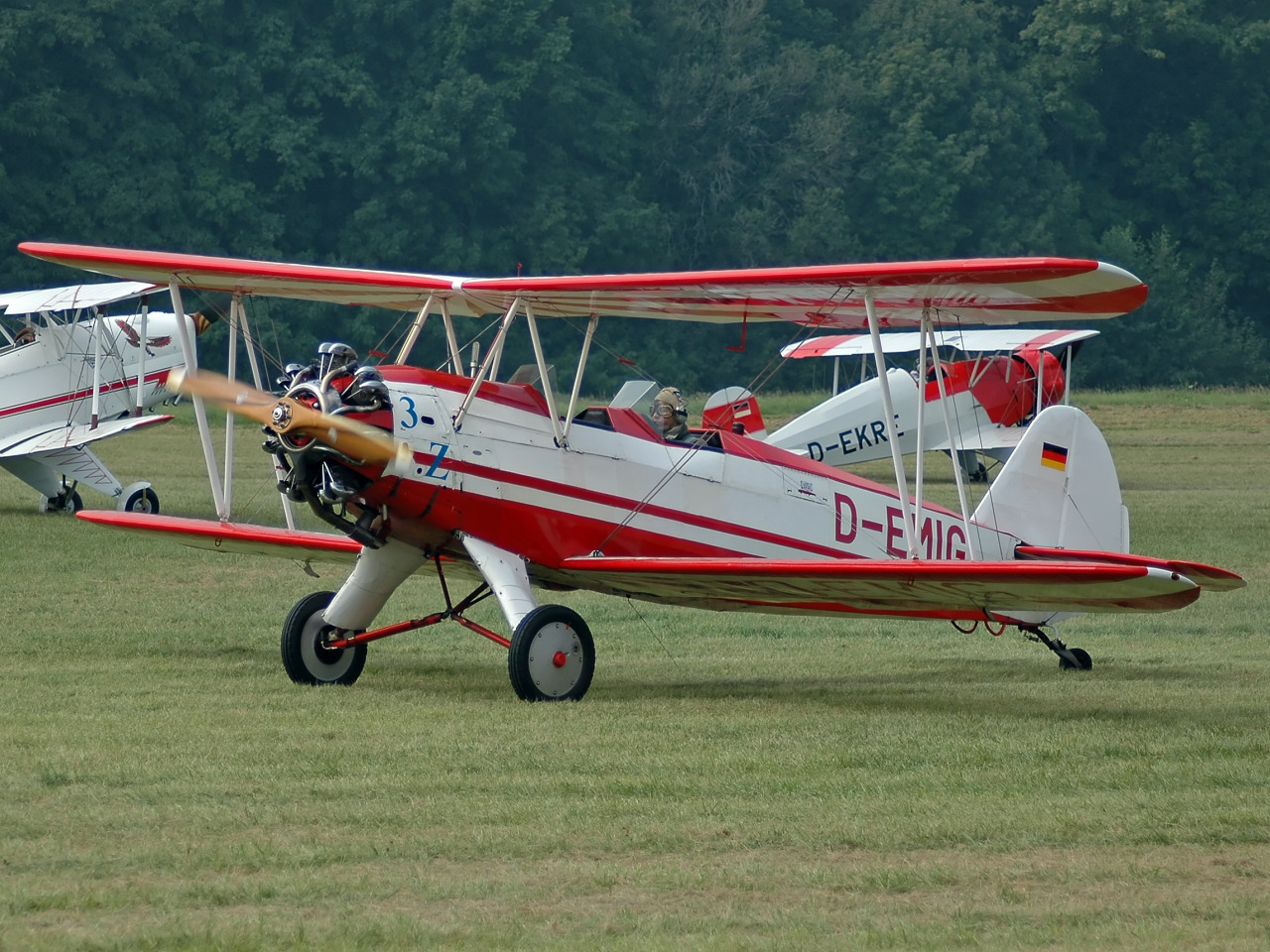
A Focke-Wulf Fw 44J in 2005

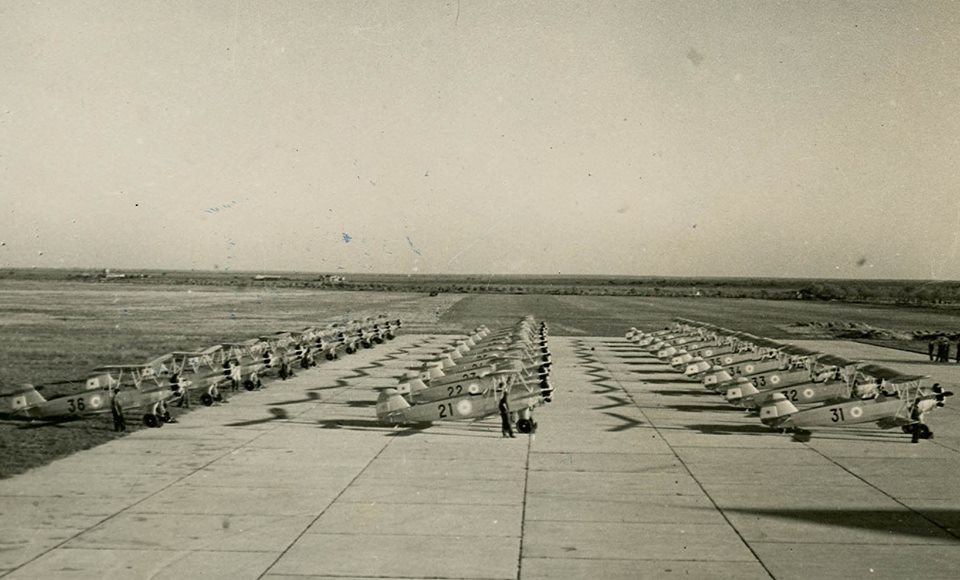
Focke-Wulf Fw 44s from Argentina, c. 1937.

Argentina

- Argentine Air Force
- Argentine Naval Aviation

The aircraft was produced under license in 1937–1942 period

Austria

- Austrian Air Force (1927–1938) – license production

Bolivia

- Bolivian Air Force – one aircraft was delivered in November 1937

Brazil

- Brazilian Air Force
- Brazilian Naval Aviation

– license production

Bulgaria

- Bulgarian Air Force – license production

China

- Republic of China Air Force

Chile

- Chilean Air Force – 15 aircraft delivered in February 1938

Colombia

- Colombian Air Force

Czechoslovakia

- Czechoslovak Air Force (postwar)

Finland

- Finnish Air Force

Germany

- Luftwaffe

Hungary

- Hungarian Air Force

Poland

- Polish Air Force

Romania

- Royal Romanian Air Force

Slovakia

- Slovak Air Force (1939–1945)

Spain

- Spanish Air Force

Sweden

- Swedish Air Force – license production; called Sk 12

Switzerland

- Swiss Air Force - One Fw 44F defected to Switzerland in 1945, and was purchased from the Allied Control Commission later that year, serving with the Swiss Air Force until 1953.

Turkey

- Turkish Air Force (1937–1962)

Yugoslavia

- SFR Yugoslav Air Force – postwar

== Specifications ==
Data from Flugzeug Typenbuch 1941

General characteristics

- Crew: 2
- Length: 7.3 m (23 ft 11 in)
- Wingspan: 9 m (29 ft 6 in)
- Height: 2.7 m (8 ft 10 in)
- Wing area: 20 m^{2} (220 sq ft)
- Empty weight: 565 kg (1,246 lb)
- Gross weight: 870 kg (1,918 lb)
- Powerplant: 1 × Bramo Sh 14A-4 seven-cylinder air-cooled radial piston engine 150 PS (148 hp; 110 kW)
- Propellers: 2-bladed Starrschraube, 2.25 m (7 ft 5 in) diameter fixed-pitch RH rotation wooden propeller

Performance

- Maximum speed: 185 km/h (115 mph, 100 kn)
- Cruise speed: 172 km/h (107 mph, 93 kn)
- Landing speed: 74 km/h (46 mph; 40 kn)
- Range: 675 km (419 mi, 364 nmi)
- Endurance: Four hours and 24 minutes
- Service ceiling: 3,900 m (12,800 ft)
- Rate of climb: 3.4 m/s (670 ft/min)
- Time to altitude:

- 1,000 m (3,300 ft) in five minutes and 30 seconds
- 3,000 m (9,800 ft) in 23 minutes and 36 seconds

- Wing loading: 43.5 kg/m^{2} (8.9 lb/sq ft)
- Power/mass: 0.1724 PS/kg (0.0771 hp/lb; 0.1268 kW/kg)
- Fuel consumption: .20 L/km (0.071 imp gal/mi)
- Oil consumption: .01 L/km (0.0035 imp gal/mi)
- Take-off distance: 140 m (460 ft)
- Landing distance: 140 m (460 ft)
