= Focke-Wulf A 32 Bussard =

A 32 Bussard
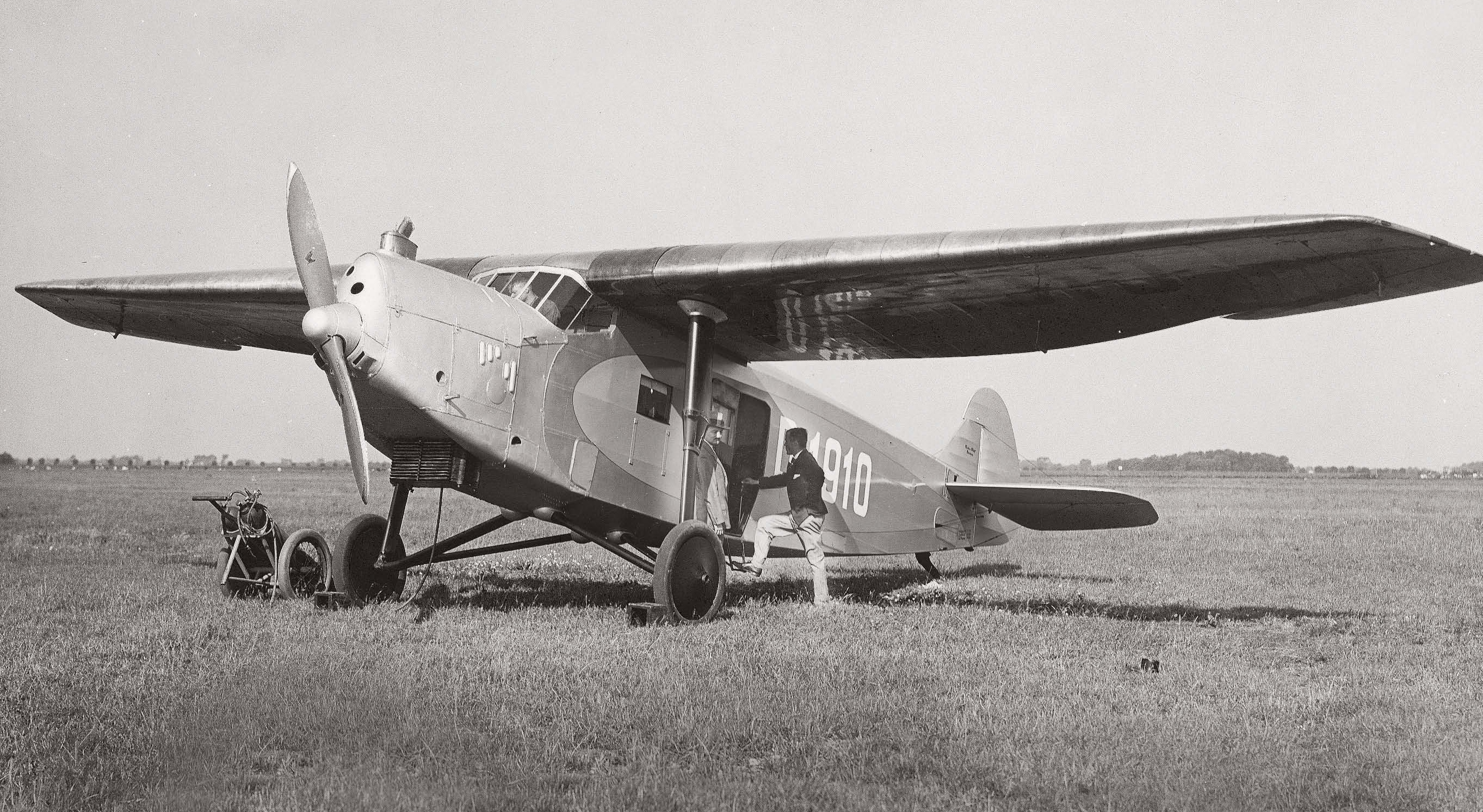

General information
- Type: Airliner
- Manufacturer: Focke-Wulf
- Designer: Wilhelm Bansemir
- Primary user: NOBA
- Number built: 5

History
- First flight: 1930

The Focke-Wulf A 32 Bussard (German: "Buzzard") was a small airliner produced in Germany in the early 1930s. It was developed rapidly at the request of NOBA when Messerschmitt was unable to deliver aircraft on schedule. Based closely on the A 20, the A 32 had a revised fuselage with greater seating capacity, and an engine of over twice the power. The two examples operated by NOBA became part of Deutsche Luft Hansa's fleet in 1934.

The flight deck was enclosed on the A.32 and was incorporated into the fuselage below and ahead of the high-mounted thick wing. The passenger cabin was under and aft of the wing. The tailskid undercarriage featured a wider tread on the mainwheels, and those wheels were supported by struts running up to the wings' undersides. The nose-mounted piston engine was cooled by a radiator, mounted in the airstream on the belly of the fuselage, under the flight deck.

== Specifications ==
General characteristics

- Crew: one-two pilots
- Capacity: six-seven passengers
- Length: 12.20 m (40 ft 0 in)
- Wingspan: 16.00 m (52 ft 6 in)
- Height: 3.25 m (10 ft 8 in)
- Wing area: 34.5 m^{2} (371 sq ft)
- Empty weight: 1,465 kg (3,230 lb)
- Gross weight: 2,300 kg (5,070 lb)
- Powerplant: 1 × Junkers L5 , 230 kW (310 hp)

Performance

- Maximum speed: 190 km/h (120 mph, 100 kn)
- Range: 900 km (560 mi, 490 nmi)
- Service ceiling: 4,500 m (14,800 ft)
- Rate of climb: 2.5 m/s (490 ft/min)
