= Focke-Wulf Fw 186 =

1937 autogyro prototype by Focke-Wulf

Fw 186
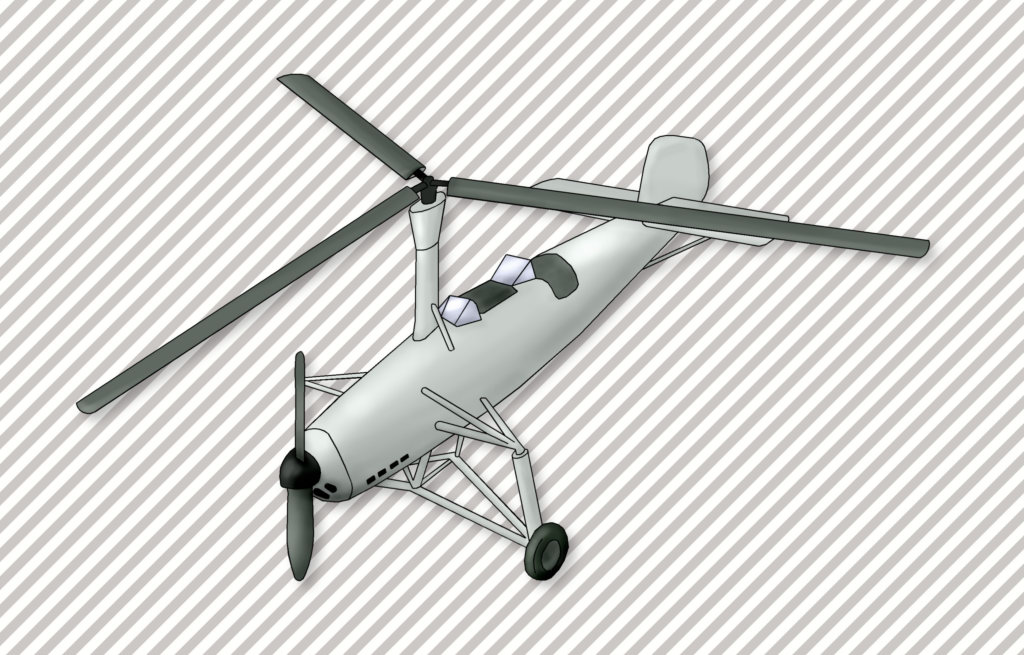
- Sketch of Focke-Wulf Fw 186

General information
- Type: Autogyro
- National origin: Germany
- Manufacturer: Focke-Wulf
- Number built: One

The Focke-Wulf Fw 186 was a one-man autogyro, built by Focke-Wulf in 1937 with backing from the RLM (ReichsLuftfahrtMinisterium - Reich Aviation Ministry), for use as a liaison and reconnaissance aircraft. It featured short takeoff and landing (STOL) characteristics.

Only one prototype of the aircraft was constructed, and the project was abandoned when the RLM preferred the Fieseler Fi 156 Storch over the Fw 186.

== See also ==
- Kayaba Ka-1, Japanese autogyro resembling the Fw 186
