= Focke-Wulf Fw 260 =

Fw 260

General information
- Type: VTOL airliner
- National origin: West Germany
- Manufacturer: Focke-Wulf
- Number built: 0

The Focke-Wulf Fw 260 Flamingo and Focke-Wulf Fw 300 were a pair of related VTOL airliner projects, designed by Focke-Wulf during the early 1960s. Neither aircraft was built.

== Fw 260 ==
The Fw 260 design was displayed at the Luftfahrtschau Hanover trade show in 1962. The aircraft's design included a high-mounted, slightly swept wing, carrying two two-engined pods for jet engines providing primary thrust, intended to be in the 9,100 pounds-force (40,000 N) class each; these were fitted with vectored thrust to assist in vertical takeoff, primary thrust for which was provided by two underwing pods each carrying six Bristol Siddeley BS.59 liftjets, each producing 7,950 pounds-force (35,400 N) thrust. Up to 85 passengers could be carried; this was later revised to 96.

== Fw 300 ==
At the Paris Air Show in 1963, the Fw 260 design was joined by a model of the Fw 300, a short-haul variant of the Fw 260. Similar to its larger relative, it was planned to carry 48-58 passengers, with a range of 200 nautical miles (370 km; 230 mi) at 456 knots (845 km/h; 525 mph); it mounted eight lift engines, instead of the Fw 260's twelve.

== Specifications (Fw 260) ==
Data from Flight

General characteristics

- Crew: three
- Capacity: 85-98
- Length: 34 m (111 ft)
- Wingspan: 24.54 m (80 ft 6 in)
- Empty weight: 22,226 kg (49,000 lb)
- Gross weight: 99,200 kg (218,699 lb)
- Powerplant: 4 × turbofan , 40 kN (9,100 lbf) thrust each
- Powerplant: 12 × Bristol Siddeley BS.59 turbojet lift jet, 35.4 kN (7,950 lbf) thrust each

Performance

- Maximum speed: 914 km/h (568 mph, 494 kn)
- Cruise speed: 798 km/h (496 mph, 431 kn)
- Range: 1,480 km (920 mi, 800 nmi) standard load

== See also ==
Aircraft of comparable role, configuration, and era

- Dornier Do 31
