= Focke-Wulf A 20 Habicht =

Airliner developed in Germany in the late 1920s

A 20 Habicht

General information
- Type: Airliner
- Manufacturer: Focke-Wulf
- Number built: 4

History
- First flight: 1927

The Focke-Wulf A 20 Habicht (German: "Hawk") was an airliner developed in Germany in the late 1920s. It was a high-wing cantilever monoplane with fixed tailskid undercarriage. The fuselage was deep and seated four passengers in a fully enclosed cabin. The type was not bought by the airlines and only a few examples were built.

== Variants ==
A.20
standard version with Mercedes D.II engine.
A.20a
one-off version with Wright Whirlwind engine, for export.
A.28
version with Bristol Titan engine.

== Specifications (A.20) ==
Data from Jane's all the World's Aircraft 1928

General characteristics

- Crew: 1
- Capacity: 3 or 4 passengers
- Length: 10.2 m (33 ft 6 in)
- Wingspan: 16 m (52 ft 6 in)
- Height: 3 m (9 ft 10 in)
- Wing area: 32 m^{2} (340 sq ft)
- Empty weight: 988 kg (2,178 lb)

A.20a 1,000 kg (2,200 lb)

- Gross weight: 1,425 kg (3,142 lb)

A.20a 1,600 kg (3,500 lb)

- Powerplant: 1 × Mercedes D.IIa 6-cylinder water-cooled in-line piston engine, 89 kW (120 hp)

A.20a 1x Wright Whirlwind 9-cylinder air-cooled radial piston engine 150 kW (200 hp)

- Propellers: 2-bladed fixed pitch propeller

Performance

- Maximum speed: 145 km/h (90 mph, 78 kn)

A.20a 170 km/h (110 mph; 92 kn)
A.20a Cruising speed 150 km/h (93 mph; 81 kn)
A.20a Landing speed 80 km/h (50 mph; 43 kn)

- Service ceiling: 3,500 m (11,500 ft)
- Time to altitude: 1,000 m (3,300 ft) in 10 minutes

A.20a 1,000 m (3,300 ft) in 5.4 minutes

- Wing loading: 44.5 kg/m^{2} (9.1 lb/sq ft)

A.20a 50 kg/m^{2} (10 lb/sq ft))

- Power/mass: 0.06323 kW/kg (0.03846 hp/lb)

A.20a 0.1021 kW/kg (0.0621 hp/lb))
