= Focke-Wulf Project I =

Proposed WWII jet fighter aircraft

Project I

General information
- Type: Fighter
- Manufacturer: Focke-Wulf
- Status: Abandoned design study

The Focke-Wulf Project I was a design study for a jet fighter, to be built in Germany during World War II. In 1942, the Reichsluftministerium (RLM) asked Professor Kurt Tank of the Focke-Wulf factory to investigate the possibility of a single-engine jet fighter. He was given the development plans of the BMW 003, Jumo 004 and Heinkel HeS 011 engines. Late in 1942 the Project Office, led by Ludwig Mittelhuber, began to work on a series of fighter projects, to be powered by one of these new turbojet units.

The first proposed design featured a BMW P.330 2 or Jumo 004 engine, positioned on the fuselage back. The pilot was situated in the fuselage nose, and underneath were four units of armament. Its mid-wing was swept forward and the V-tail was swept back. The mainwheels of the tricycle undercarriage were so positioned under the fuselage that they could lie between themselves, when retracted.

== Specifications (as designed) ==
General characteristics

- Crew: one pilot
- Length: 10.50 m (34 ft 5 in)
- Wingspan: 8.20 m (26 ft 11 in)
- Wing area: 14.0 m^{2} (151 sq ft)
- Powerplant: 1 × BMW P.3302 turbojet , 5.9 kN (1,322 lbf) thrust

Performance

- Maximum speed: 800 km/h (500 mph, 430 kn)
- Endurance: 1 hours 30 minutes
- Service ceiling: 10,800 m (35,500 ft)
- Rate of climb: 11.0 m/s (2,165 ft/min)

Armament

- 2 × 30 mm (1.18 in) MK 108 cannons
- 2 × 15 mm (.59 in) MG 151 cannons

== See also ==
- Emergency Fighter Program
