= Focke-Wulf =

Defunct German aircraft manufacturer

Focke-Wulf Flugzeugbau
- Formerly: Bremer Flugzeugbau
- Type: initially AG, later GmbH
- Industry: Aerospace
- Founded: October 24, 1923; 102 years ago
- Founders: Henrich Focke; Werner Naumann; Georg Wulf
- Defunct: 1964
- Fate: Merged with Weser Flugzeugbau
- Successor: Vereinigte Flugtechnische Werke
- Headquarters: Bremen, Germany
- Key people: Hans Multhopp; Kurt Tank

Focke-Wulf Flugzeugbau AG (Focke-Wulf Aircraft Manufacturing SA), commonly known as Focke-Wulf (German pronunciation: [ˌfɔkəˈvʊlf]), was a German manufacturer of civil and military aircraft before and during World War II. Many of the company's successful fighter aircraft designs were slight modifications of the Focke-Wulf Fw 190. It is one of the predecessor companies of today's Airbus.

== History ==
The company was founded in Bremen on 24 October 1923 as Bremer Flugzeugbau AG by Prof. Henrich Focke, (Note: In 1937, shareholders ousted Henrich Focke.) Georg Wulf (Note: Georg Wulf died during a test flight 29 September 1927.) and Dr. rer. pol. Werner Naumann. (Note: Dr. rer. pol. Werner Naumann is not to be confused with Dr. rer. nat. Werner Naumann, state secretary in Joseph Goebbel's Propagandaministerium.) Almost immediately, they renamed the company Focke-Wulf Flugzeugbau AG (later Focke-Wulf Flugzeugbau GmbH).

Focke-Wulf merged, under government pressure, with Albatros Flugzeugwerke of Berlin in 1931. The Albatros Flugzeugwerke engineer and test pilot Kurt Tank became head of the technical department and started work on the Fw 44 Stieglitz (Goldfinch).

Dr Ludwig Roselius became chairman in 1925 and handed over to his brother Friedrich in early 1933. In 1938 Roselius' HAG combine increased its shareholding to 46% and C. Lorenz AG secured 28%. The company was reconstituted as Focke-Wulf Flugzeugbau GmbH and no longer had to publish its accounts. A substantial capital injection occurred at this time.

In August 1933 Hans Holle and Rudolf Schubert were given power of attorney over the Berlin branch of Focke-Wulf. Then in October 1933, Focke-Wulf Flugzeugbau A.G. Albatros Berlin was officially registered with the Department of Trade.

Dr Roselius always remained the driving force of Focke-Wulf. He and his closest collaborator, Barbara Goette, often met with technical director Professor Kurt Tank. When Roselius died in May 1943, Heinrich Puvogel (later chair of Focke-Wulf) raised 4 million RM and continued handling the financial affairs of Focke-Wulf as chief of Seehandel A.G.

Hanna Reitsch demonstrated the Focke-Wulf Fw 61, the first fully controllable helicopter (as opposed to autogyro), in Berlin in 1938. The four-engined Fw 200 airliner flew nonstop between Berlin and New York City on 10 August 1938, making the journey in 24 hours and 56 minutes. It was the first aircraft to fly that route without stopping. The return trip on 13 August 1938, took 19 hours and 47 minutes. These flights are commemorated with a plaque in the Böttcherstraße street of Bremen.

The Fw 190 Würger (Shrike/butcher-bird), designed from 1938 on, and produced in quantity from early 1941–1945, was a mainstay single-seat fighter for the Luftwaffe during World War II.

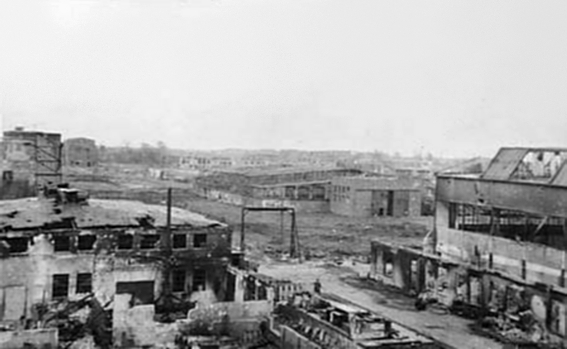
Destroyed Focke-Wulf plant in Bremen (1945)

Repeated bombing of Bremen in World War II resulted in the mass-production plants being moved to eastern Germany and General Government, with AGO Flugzeugwerke of Oschersleben as a major subcontractor for the Fw 190. Those plants used many foreign and forced labourers, and from 1944 also prisoners of war. Focke-Wulf's 100-acre (0.40 km^{2}) plant at Marienburg produced approximately half of all Fw 190s and was bombed by the Eighth Air Force on 9 October 1943.

Many Focke-Wulf workers, including Kurt Tank, worked at the Instituto Aerotécnico in Córdoba, Argentina between 1947 and 1955. Others, like Henrich Focke, went to Brazil's Department of Aerospace Science and Technology, helping Brazil's effort to build Embraer. Focke-Wulf began to make gliders in 1951, and in 1955, motorised planes. Focke-Wulf, Weserflug and Hamburger Flugzeugbau joined forces in 1961 to form the Entwicklungsring Nord (ERNO) to develop rockets.

ITT Corporation, which had acquired a 25% stake in the company prior to the war, won $27 million in compensation in the 1960s for the damage that was inflicted on its share of the Focke-Wulf plant by WWII Allied bombing. Colonel Sosthenes Behn, Ludwig Roselius and Barbara Goette outfoxed Hitler in 1936 when he tried to have Roselius removed as a major stakeholder from Focke-Wulf A.G. and reconstitution followed resulting in the privatized company Focke-Wulf Flugzeugbau GmbH. Focke-Wulf formally merged with Weserflug in 1964, becoming Vereinigte Flugtechnische Werke (VFW), which after several further mergers became the European Aeronautic Defence and Space Company N.V. (EADS). EADS was later renamed as Airbus.

In early 2021 Focke Wulf Aircraft was re-registered as a trademark across the EU, the UK and Australia as a retailer of aviation watches and associated official Focke Wulf merchandise.

== Aircraft ==
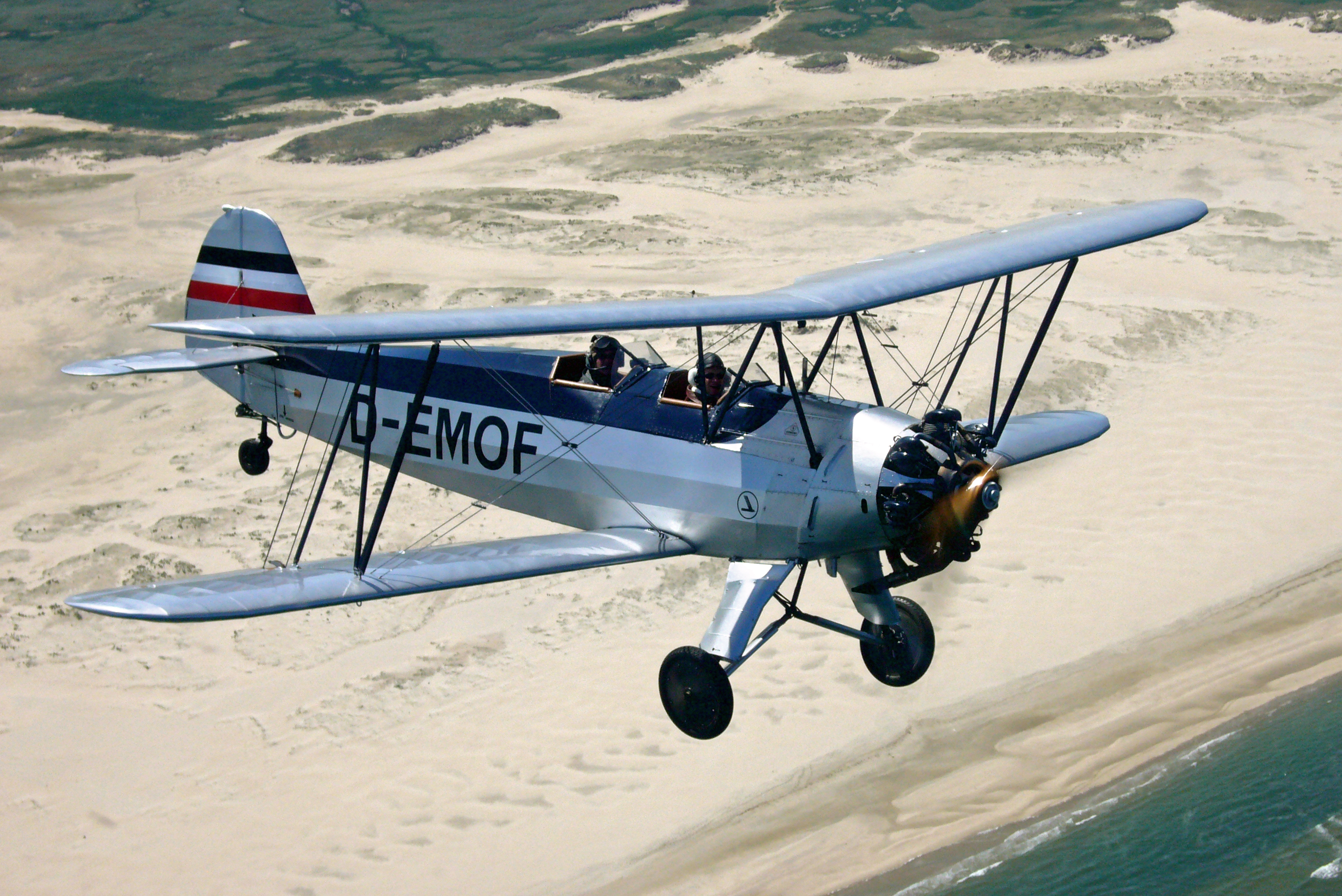
1932 – Focke-Wulf Fw 44 Stieglitz

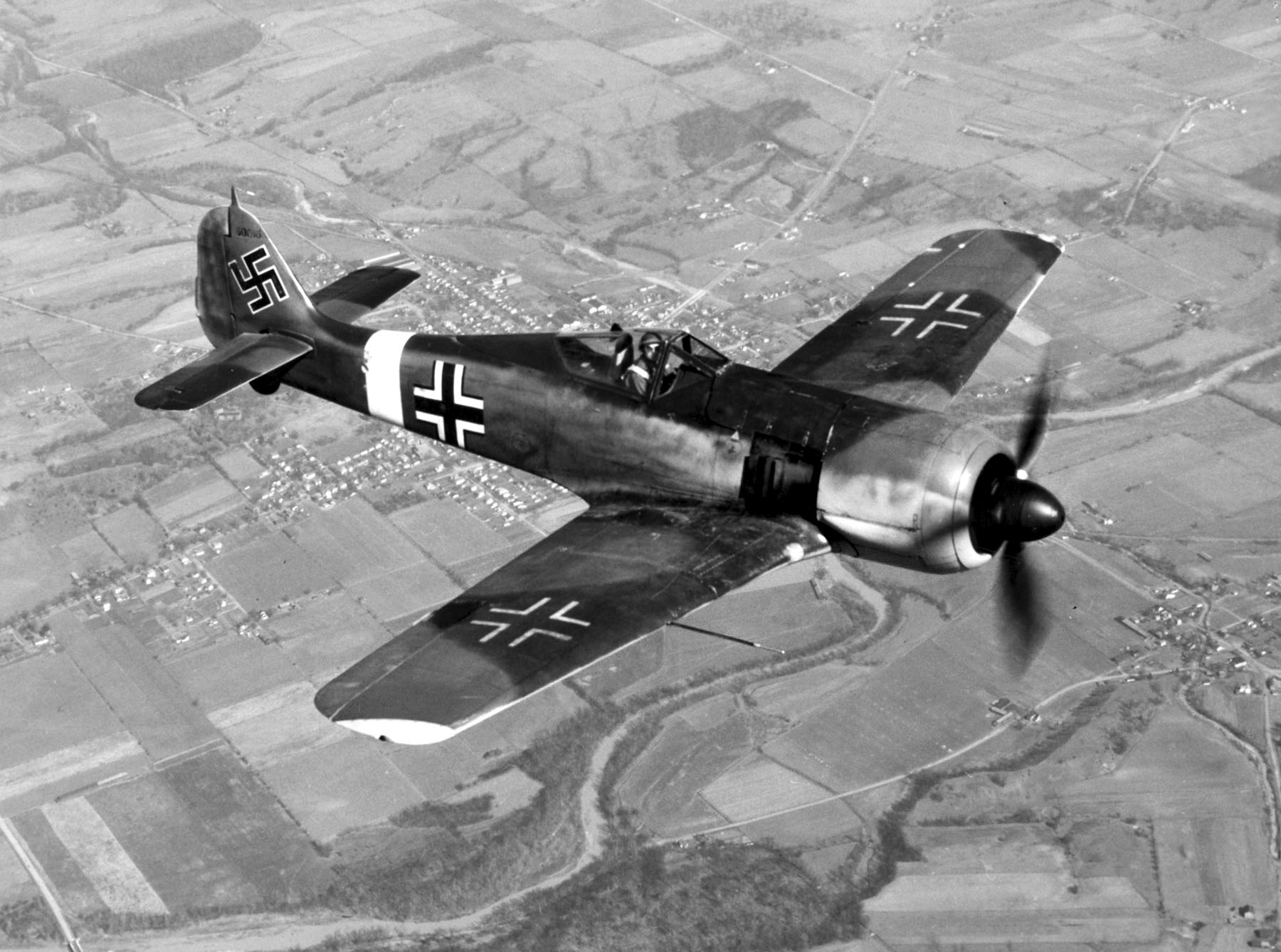
1939 – Focke-Wulf Fw 190

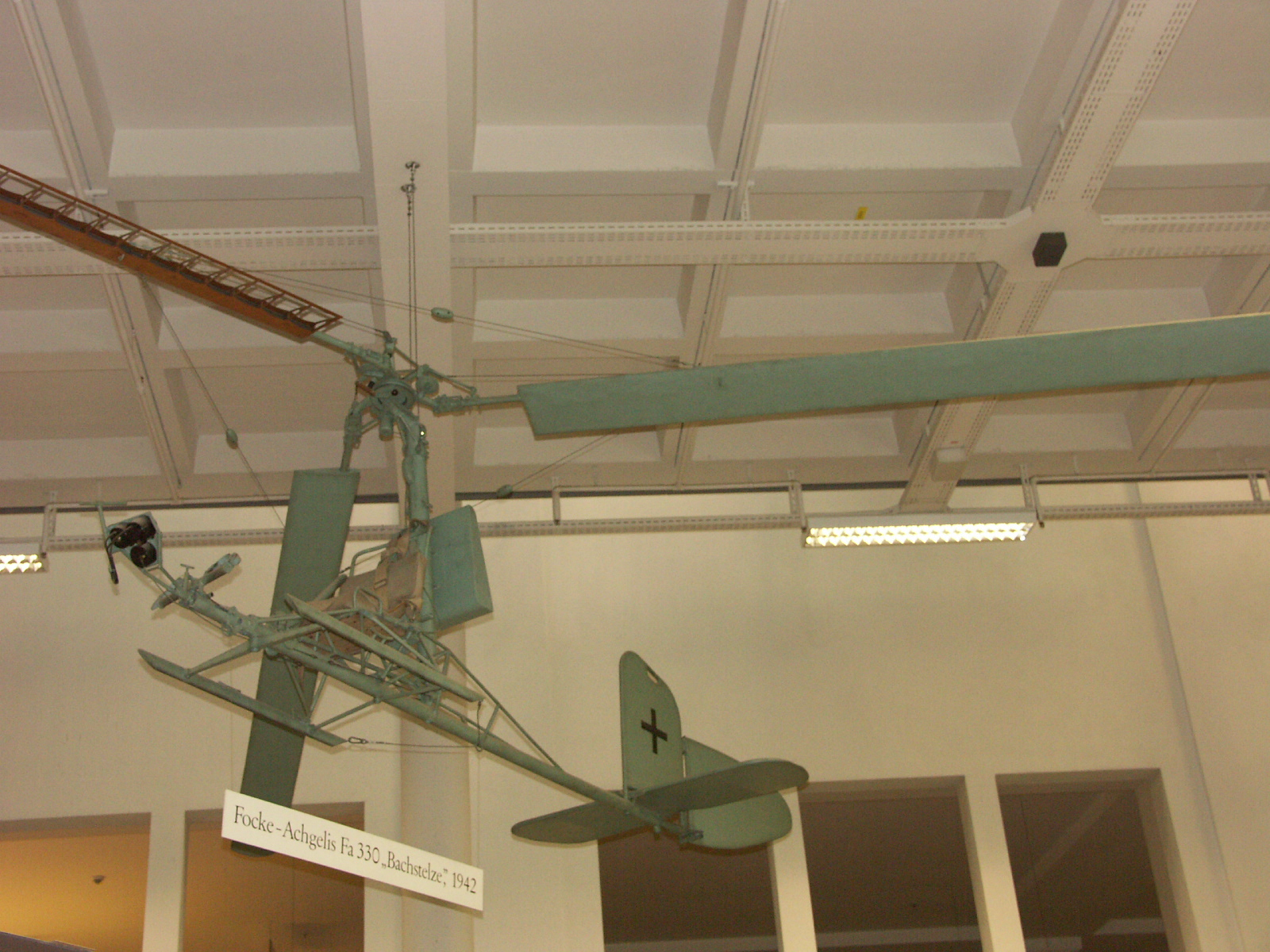
1943 – Focke-Achgelis Fa 330

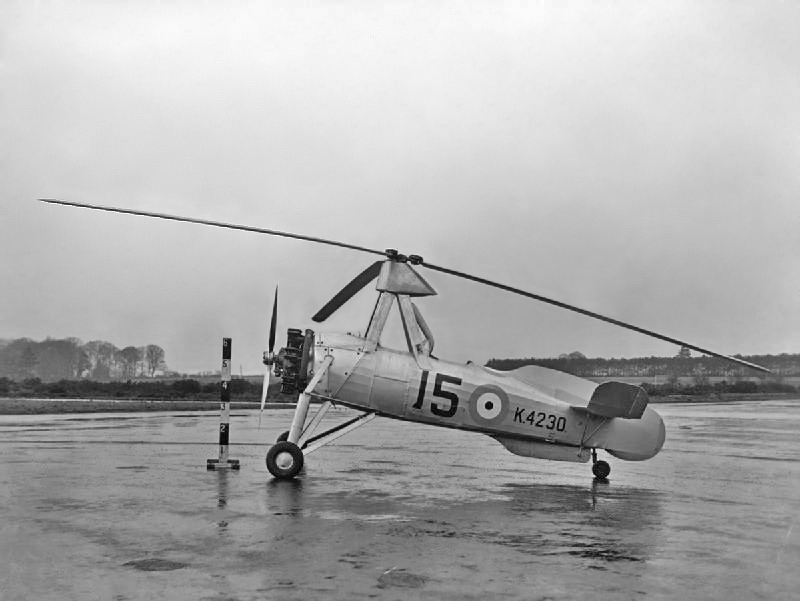
Focke-Wulf Fw 30

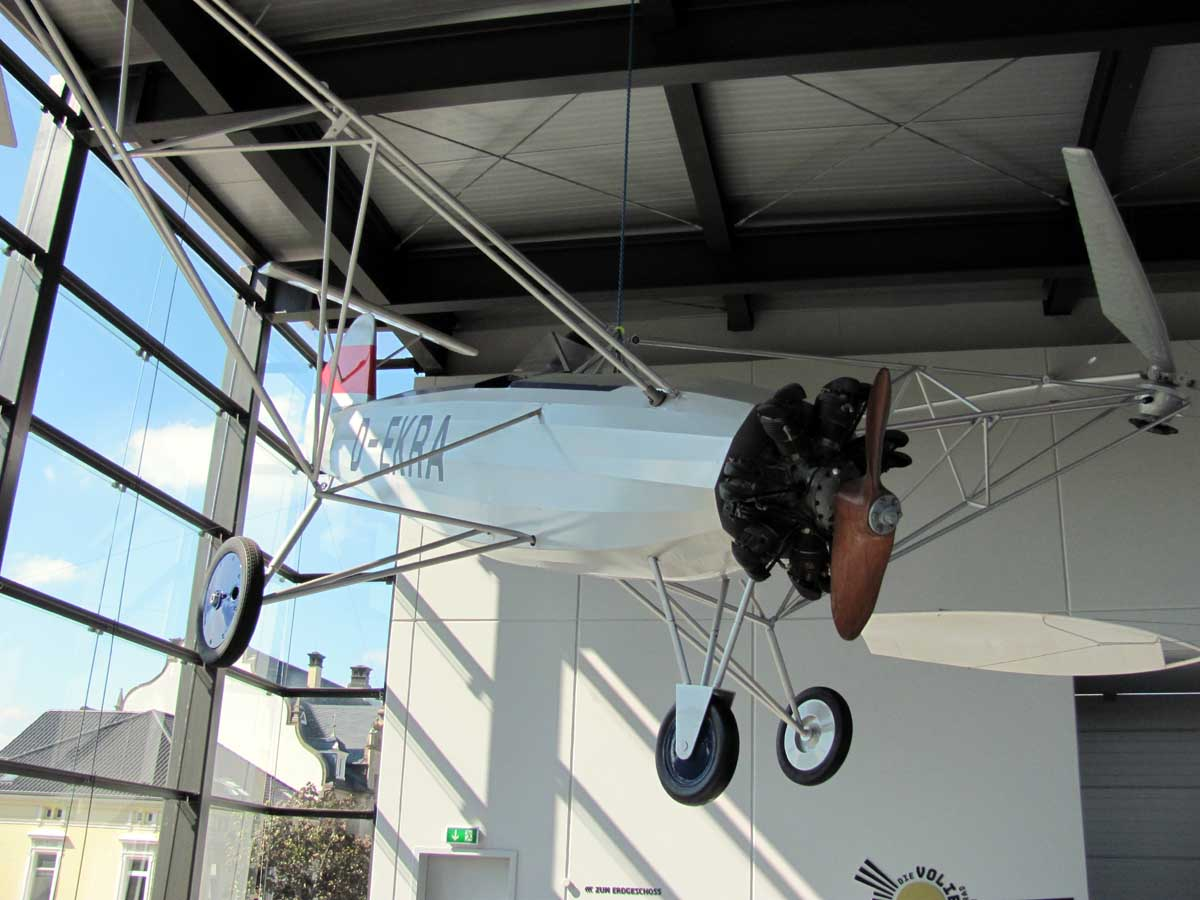
Focke-Wulf Fw 61

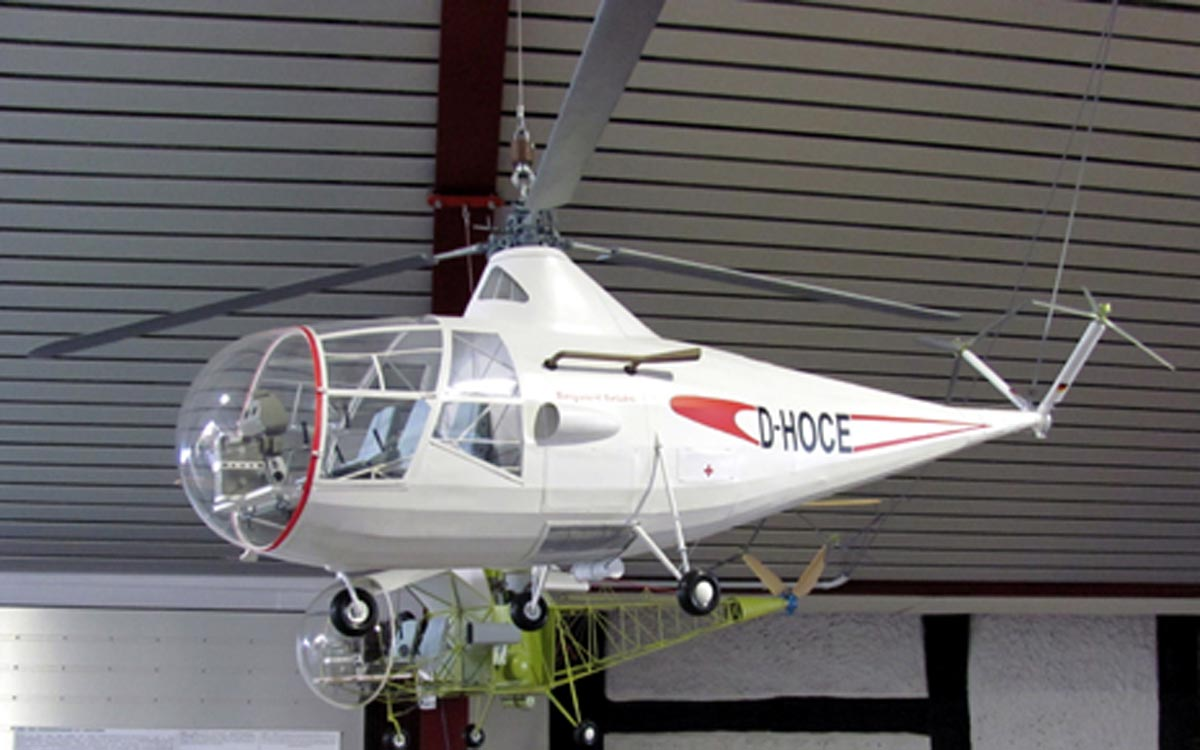
Borgward Kolibri

=== Company designations ===
In alphabetical order:

- Focke-Wulf A 3
- Focke-Wulf A 4
- Focke-Wulf A 5
- Focke-Wulf A 6
- Focke-Wulf A 7
- Focke-Wulf A 16 – light transport aircraft, 1924. First design built by Focke-Wulf.
- Focke-Wulf A 17 Möwe (Gull) – 8-passenger airliner, 1927.
- Focke-Wulf A 20 Habicht (Hawk) – 4-passenger feederliner, 1927.
- Focke-Wulf A 21 Photomöwe – aerial photography version of A 17, 1929.
- Focke-Wulf A 26 – engine testbed
- Focke-Wulf A 28 – A 20 with Bristol Titan engine
- Focke-Wulf A 29 – production version of A 17, 1929.
- Focke-Wulf A 32 Bussard (Buzzard) – airliner, 1930.
- Focke-Wulf A 33 Sperber (Sparrowhawk) – 3-passenger airliner, 1930.
- Focke-Wulf A 36 Mastgans (Mast Goose) – mail plane, 1931.
- Focke-Wulf A 38 Möwe (Gull) – 10-passenger airliner, 1931.
- Focke-Wulf F 19 Ente (Duck) – experimental civil utility aircraft, 1927.
- Focke-Wulf GL 18 – light transport aircraft developed from the A 16, 1926.
- Focke-Wulf GL 22 – revised GL 18, 1927.
- Focke-Wulf K 23 Buchfink (Chaffinch) – two-seat reconnaissance aircraft, 1928.
- Focke-Wulf AL 101 D Albatros
- Focke-Wulf S 1 – trainer, 1925.
- Focke-Wulf S 2 – two-seat trainer, 1928.
- Focke-Wulf S 24 Kiebitz (Lapwing) – two-seat sports biplane, 1928.
- Focke-Wulf S 39 – two-seat reconnaissance parasol monoplane, 1931-1932.
- Focke-Wulf W 4 – reconnaissance floatplane, 1927.
- Focke-Wulf W 7 – maritime patrol biplane, 1932.

=== RLM designations ===
- Focke-Wulf Fw 40 short-range reconnaissance parasol monoplane (prototype), 1932; known internally as A 40.
- Focke-Wulf Fw 43 Falke (Falcon) – utility aircraft (prototype), 1932; known internally as A 43.
- Focke-Wulf Fw 44 Stieglitz (Goldfinch) – trainer (biplane), 1932.
- Focke-Wulf Fw 47 Höhengeier (Vulture) – weather aircraft, 1931; known internally as A 47.
- Focke-Wulf Fw 55 – biplane floatplane derived from the Albatros L102, 1932.
- Focke-Wulf Fw 56 Stösser (Goshawk) – advanced trainer (parasol monoplane), 1933
- Focke-Wulf Fw 57 – twin-engined heavy fighter-bomber (prototype), 1935.
- Focke-Wulf Fw 58 Weihe (Kite) – transport/photo reconnaissance/weather research aircraft, 1937.
- Focke-Wulf Fw 61 – helicopter (prototype), 1936.
- Focke-Wulf Fw 62 – ship-borne reconnaissance (biplane seaplane), 1937.
- Focke-Wulf Ta 152 – interceptor/fighter (derived from Fw 190), 1944.
- Focke-Wulf Ta 154 Moskito (Mosquito) – night-fighter with wood structure like its British namesake, 1943.
- Focke-Wulf Fw 159 – fighter (prototype only), 1935.
- Focke-Wulf Fw 186 – autogiro reconnaissance aircraft (prototype), 1937.
- Focke-Wulf Fw 187 Falke (Falcon) – twin-engined two-seat heavy day fighter ("Zerstörer"), 1936.
- Focke-Wulf Fw 189 Uhu (Eagle Owl) – twin-engined, three-seat army cooperation/tactical reconnaissance, 1938.
- Focke-Wulf Fw 190 Würger (Shrike/butcher-bird) – single-seat fighter/interceptor, 1939
- Focke-Wulf Fw 191 – twin-engine Bomber B design competitor (prototype), 1942.
- Focke-Wulf Fw 200 Condor – four-engine airliner and maritime patrol-bomber, 1937.

=== Built under license ===
- Focke-Wulf C.19 – license-built (autogyro)– licence-built version of the Cierva C.19, with Siemens Sh 14 engine. (one prototype, converted from Cierva C.19 Mk.IV)
- Focke-Wulf C.30 Heuschrecke (Grasshopper) – licence-built version of the Cierva C.30, with Siemens Sh 14 engine.
- Focke-Wulf FWP.149D – license-built Piaggio P.149

=== Planned/unfinished designs ===
- Focke-Wulf Fw 42 – twin-engined medium bomber project developed from the F 19, 1933.
- Focke-Wulf Ta 183 Huckebein – design for a jet-engined fighter, 1942.
- Focke-Wulf Fw 206 – planned commercial aircraft, 1940.
- Focke-Wulf Fw 238 – long-range bomber project (RLM airframe number 8-238 already used by Blohm und Voss)
- Focke-Wulf Fw 249 – large transport aircraft project; officially designated as Project 195.
- Focke-Wulf Fw 250 – twin-engine jet fighter project
- Focke-Wulf Fw 252 – single engine jet fighter
- Focke-Wulf Ta 254 – proposed version of the Ta 154 fighter.
- Focke-Wulf Fw 259 Frontjäger (concept)
- Focke-Wulf Fw 260 – 1960s VTOL airliner proposal
- Focke-Wulf Fw 261 – four-engine bomber/reconnaissance/U-boat support aircraft project
- Focke-Wulf Ta 283 – interceptor fighter project
- Focke-Wulf Fw 300 – proposed long-range version of Fw 200, 1941-1942.
- Focke-Wulf Ta 400 – Amerikabomber design competitor, never built, 1943.
- Focke-Wulf Fw P.03.10206 – series of long-range strategic bomber projects, 1944.
- Focke-Wulf Fw P.03.10221-15 – large capacity strategic transport, 1941.
- Focke-Wulf Fw P.03.10025 – A 1944 design with a swept wing, a forward-swept V-tail, and two pusher propellers at the rear.
- Focke-Wulf Fw 03.10251 – series of jet-engined night and bad weather fighters
- Focke-Wulf Fighter Project w/BMW803 – A 1941 design with a connected twin-boom tail, slightly swept-back wings, and two pusher propellers at the rear.

=== Projects ===
- Focke-Wulf 1000x1000x1000 – series of bomber designs, 1944.
- Focke-Wulf Project I – single-seat jet fighter, 1943.
- Focke-Wulf Project II
- Focke-Wulf Project III
- Focke-Wulf Project VII "Flitzer" – fighter project, 1944.
- Focke-Wulf Project VIII – turboprop powered fighter-bomber project, also designated Fw 281
- Focke Rochen – 1950s VTOL fighter project
- Focke-Wulf Super Lorin – Ramjet-rocket combo powered fighter
- Focke-Wulf Fw 354 Triebflügel – tail-sitter VTOL interceptor design
- Focke-Wulf TO Project
- Focke-Wulf Volksjäger – rocket-powered interceptor fighter project
- Focke-Wulf VTOL Project

== See also ==
- Focke-Achgelis
- List of RLM aircraft designations
