= Focke-Wulf S 2 =

S 2
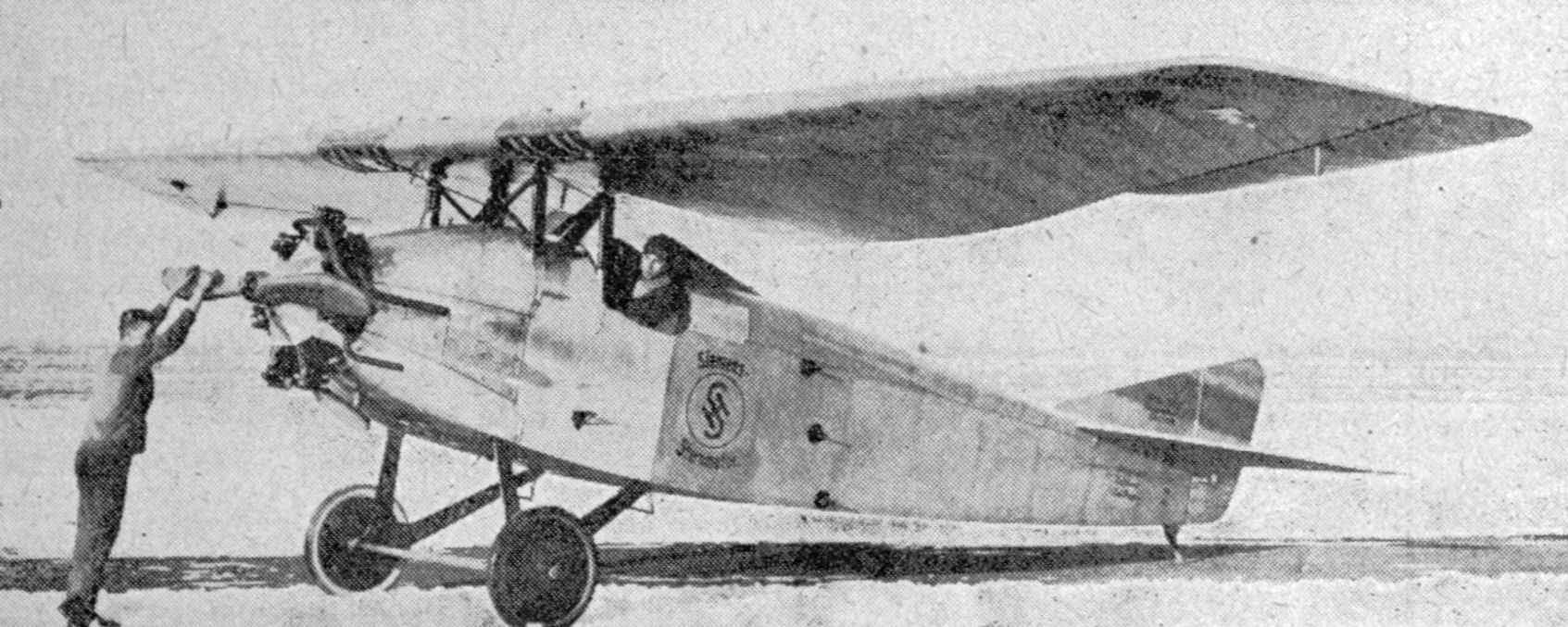

General information
- Type: Trainer
- Manufacturer: Focke-Wulf
- Number built: 1

History
- First flight: 1928

The Focke-Wulf S 2 was a trainer aircraft built in Germany in the late 1920s. It was a conventional parasol-wing monoplane with fixed tailskid undercarriage. The pilot and instructor sat side by side in an open cockpit. Only a single example was built.

== Specifications (S 2) ==
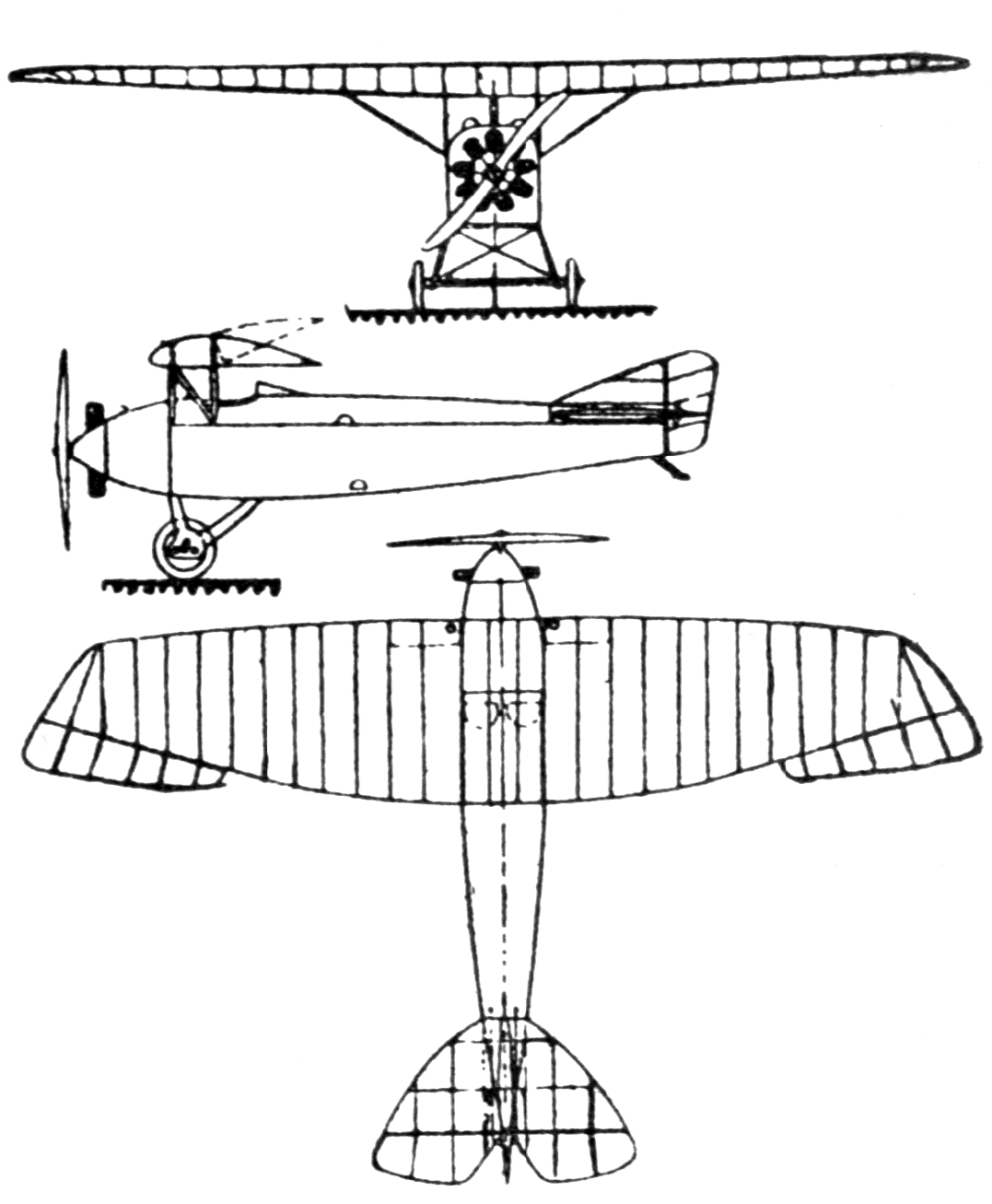
Focke-Wulf S 2 3-view drawing from Le Document aéronautique July,1928

Data from Jane's all the World's Aircraft 1928

General characteristics

- Crew: 2
- Length: 8.1 m (26 ft 7 in)
- Wingspan: 12 m (39 ft 4 in)
- Height: 2.8 m (9 ft 2 in)
- Wing area: 22 m^{2} (240 sq ft)
- Empty weight: 570 kg (1,257 lb)
- Gross weight: 820 kg (1,808 lb)
- Powerplant: 1 × Siemens-Halske Sh.11 7-cylinder air-cooled radial piston engine, 60 kW (80 hp)
- Propellers: 2-bladed fixed pitch propeller

Performance

- Maximum speed: 135 km/h (84 mph, 73 kn)
- Landing speed: 55 km/h (34 mph; 30 kn)
- Service ceiling: 3,500 m (11,500 ft)
- Time to altitude: 1,000 m (3,300 ft) in 9 minutes
- Wing loading: 37.2 kg/m^{2} (7.6 lb/sq ft)
- Power/mass: 0.074 kW/kg (0.045 hp/lb)
