= Focke-Wulf Fw 206 =

Proposed airliner

General information
- Type: Commercial aircraft
- National origin: Germany
- Manufacturer: Focke-Wulf
- Number built: 0

The Focke-Wulf Fw 206 was a German planned commercial aircraft, designed by Focke-Wulf. The aircraft was designed to be an all-metal, low-wing monoplane, and was to be powered by two BMW Bramo 323 R engines, each producing 1,000 horsepower (750 kW). The prototype was not produced, however, due to the start of World War II.

The design heavily resembled the Douglas DC-3.

== Specifications ==
General characteristics

- Length: 19.6 m (64 ft 4 in)
- Wingspan: 27.3 m (89 ft 7 in)
- Height: 5.45 m (17 ft 11 in)
- Powerplant: 2 × BMW Bramo 323 R radial engine, 750 kW (1,000 hp) each
