= Focke-Wulf A 16 =

Focke-Wulf A.16
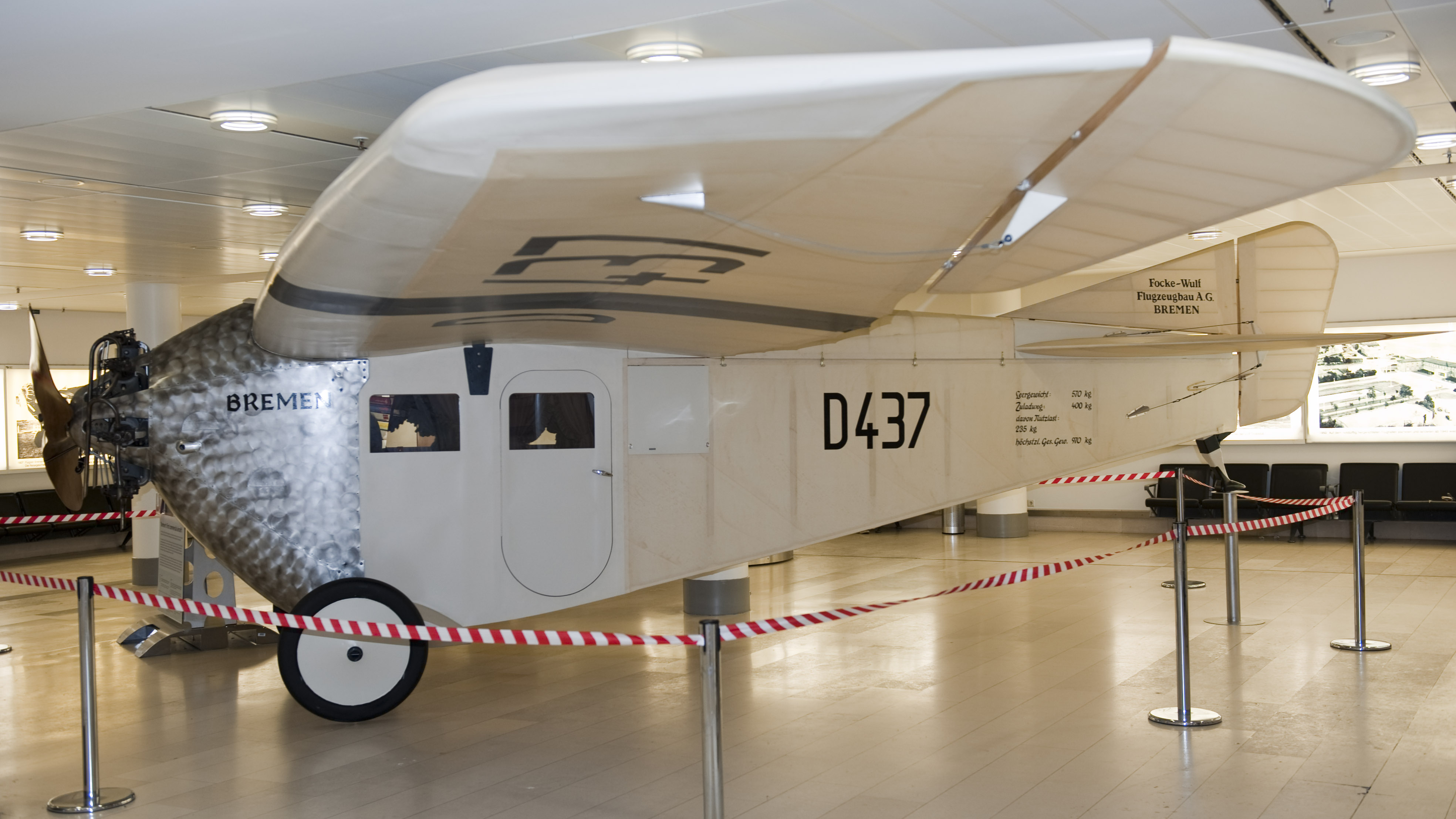

General information
- Type: Light passenger transport
- Manufacturer: Focke-Wulf Flugzeugbau AG
- Designer: Heinrich Focke; Georg Wulf

History
- Manufactured: 20+
- First flight: 23 June 1924

The Focke-Wulf A.16 was a German three/four passenger light transport monoplane designed by Heinrich Focke and Georg Wulf and was the first design built by the newly formed Focke-Wulf company.

== Development ==
With the success of their earlier designs, Focke and Wulf formed the Focke-Wulf company in 1924 and their first design was an all-wood three/four passenger airliner or light transport, the A.16, first flown by Georg Wulf on 23 June 1924. At least 20 aircraft were built; according to Airbus Industrie, Bremen, 23 were built. Airbus has built another one in the last ten years, though not airworthy, which is on display at Bremen Airport.

The A.16 was a high-wing cantilever monoplane of conventional configuration. The wing used a thick airfoil. The pilot sat in an open cockpit above the wing while the passengers were carried in the enclosed fuselage below. The tailskid undercarriage featured large wheels mounted on each side of the fuselage.

== Variants ==
A.16a
Variant powered by a 100 hp (75 kW) Mercedes D.I engine.
A.16b
Variant powered by an 85 hp (63 kW) Junkers L1a engine.
A.16c
Variant powered by a 100 hp (75 kW) Siemens-Halske Sh 12 engine.
A.16d
Variant powered by a 120 hp (89 kW) Mercedes D.II or D.IIa engine.

== Specifications (A.16c) ==
Data from The Illustrated Encyclopedia of Aircraft (Part Work 1982-1985), 1985, Orbis Publishing, Page 1835

General characteristics

- Crew: one
- Capacity: three–four
- Length: 8.5 m (27 ft 10.75 in)
- Wingspan: 13.90 m (45 ft 7.25 in)
- Height: 2.30 m (7 ft 6.5 in)
- Wing area: 27.1 m^{2} (291 sq ft)
- Empty weight: 570 kg (1,256 lb)
- Gross weight: 970 kg (2,138 lb)
- Powerplant: 1 × Siemens-Halske Sh 11 7-cylinder radial piston engine , 56 kW (75 hp)

Performance

- Maximum speed: 135 km/h (84 mph, 73 kn)
- Range: 550 km (342 mi, 297 nmi)
- Service ceiling: 2,500 m (8,200 ft)
