= Focke-Wulf A 17 Möwe =

Propeller airliner

A 17 Möwe
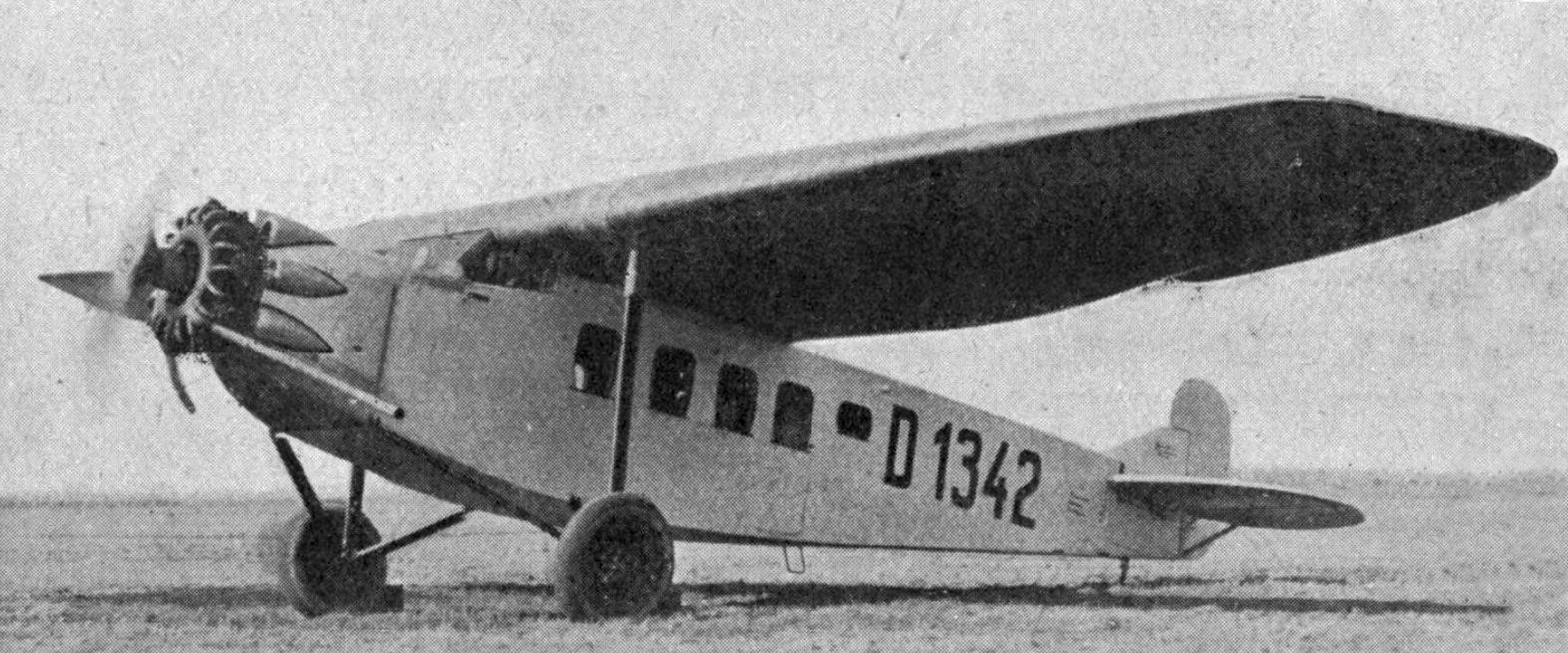

General information
- Type: Airliner
- Manufacturer: Focke-Wulf
- Primary user: Deutsche Luft Hansa
- Number built: 20

History
- First flight: 1927

The Focke-Wulf A 17 Möwe (German: "Gull") was an airliner designed and produced by the German aircraft manufacturer Focke-Wulf. It was the company's first large commercial aircraft.

It was developed in the late 1920s with the goal of producing a competitive civil aircraft that possessed a minimal production cost and a high load-carrying capability. The resulting aircraft was a conventional high-wing cantilever monoplane with a fixed tailwheel undercarriage. It provided fully enclosed seating for up to eight passengers in relatively luxurious conditions for the era as well as a fully enclosed cockpit for the two pilots. The exterior of the steel tube airframe was streamlined and was covered with fabric, except for the wings, which were plywood instead.

The A 17 performed its maiden flight in 1927, and entered revenue service several months thereafter. It was only ever produced in limited quantities, the primary customer of the type being the German airline Deutsche Luft Hansa. Several aircraft were also used for experimental purposes and as trials aircraft, such as for the Junkers Jumo 5 diesel engine. Operation of all A 17s was discontinued during the latter part of the 1930s.

== Development ==
The project that would produce the A 17 was a novel undertaking for the German aircraft manufacturer Focke-Wulf, being the company's first large commercial aircraft. Nevertheless, the design team held to several established principles for the project, specifically the pursuit of low manufacturing costs and a comparatively generous load-carrying capacity. The resulting aircraft would be economic and available for purchase by 1926 at a competitively low price tag. The efficient model that this combination delivered was thought to have made the A 17 an attractive prospect to potential operators.

The A 17 Möwe was a high-wing cantilever monoplane. It was powered by a single nose-mounted engine. It could easily be removed for maintenance or replacement purposes by simply undoing four bolts that secured the engine bearer to the four primary longerons. Safety measures including a firewall and fire extinguisher that could be remotely operated from the cockpit.

The exterior of the aircraft was streamlined, yielding both aerodynamic efficiency and a pleasing aesthetic. Extensive use of steel tube framework was used in the structure of the airframe while the exterior of the fuselage was covered with fabric. The wing, however, was covered with plywood. The leading edge of the wing contained a series of rubber cables that provided shock absorption to the undercarriage, the twin pairs of steel-tubing struts of the undercarriage having been braced by vertical struts that were connected to the wing.

It had a relatively spacious cockpit that was designed to accommodate a pair of pilots. Access to the cockpit was via a door in the forward wall of the passenger cabin. The cockpit was enclosed by a windshield; the pilots had favourable visibility, both forward and laterally. Dual flight controls were fitted as standard, although the principal pilot had the ability to disconnect them if so desired. Both the elevator and ailerons were operated via hand wheels while the rudder was controlled by a rudder bar. The stabilizer could be trimmed mid-flight to account for any centre-of-gravity changes via a hand wheel on the left hand wall of the cockpit. Typical instrumentation for the era was present. The cockpit also had a compressed-air starter that was used to ignite the engine.

The passenger cabin, which was elegantly furnished for the time, was located aft of the cockpit. Entry was relatively easy from ground level. In a typical configuration, the cabin would contain eight comfortable chairs. The walls of the cabin featured relatively large windows for lighting purposes; these windows could be let down and provide passengers with an unobstructed view. Beneath the passenger cabin was a baggage hold; forward of this hold and underneath the cockpit was a room intended for storing air mail.

== Operational history ==
The test flight programme was performed at Adlershof. The majority of aircraft flew with the national airline Deutsche Luft Hansa; it operated the type through to sometime in 1936.

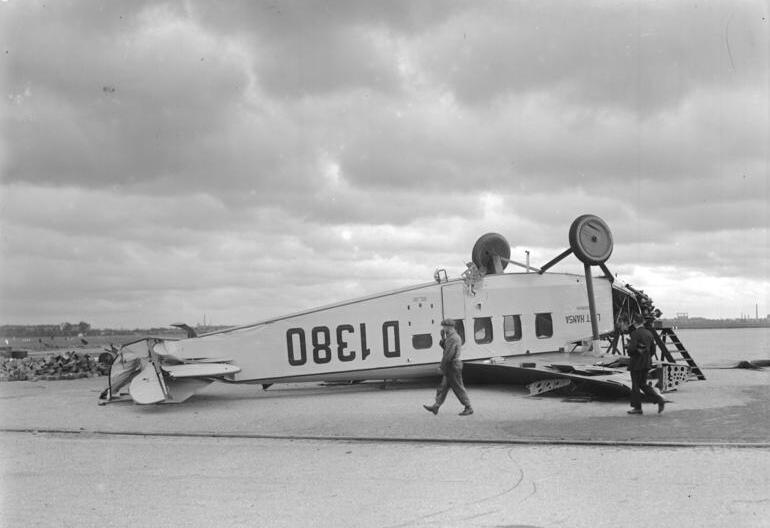
Focke-Wulf A 17 at Berlin-Tempelhof after sustaining storm damage in July 1928

In its later life, individual aircraft were often used for experimental and flight test purposes. In the early 1930s, two A 17s were used for testing the Junkers Jumo 5 diesel engine. In 1929, an example was built with a BMW VI engine and fitted out for aerial photography and survey work and designated A 21; the cabin of this aircraft was equipped with a darkroom. Later the same year, the BMW engine was used on a further five airliners for Luft Hansa, these being designated A 29.

== Variants ==
- A 17 - Eight-passenger airliner powered by 420 hp (310 kW) Gnome et Rhône 9Aa Jupiter. One prototype and 11 production aircraft.
  - A 17a - Conversion of A 17 with 480 hp (360 kW) geared Siemens Jupiter VI engine.
  - A 17b - Conversion with Siemens Sh 20u engine. One converted.
  - A 17c - Conversion with 520 hp (390 kW) Junkers Jumo 5C diesel engine. One converted.
- A 21 Photomöwe - Photographic fitted with BMW VI engine (two built)
- A 26 - Converted A 17 used as an experimental aircraft by Deutsche Versuchsanstalt für Luftfahrt (DVL).
- A 29 - production version of A 17 with BMW VI engine. Five built.

== Specifications (A 17a) ==
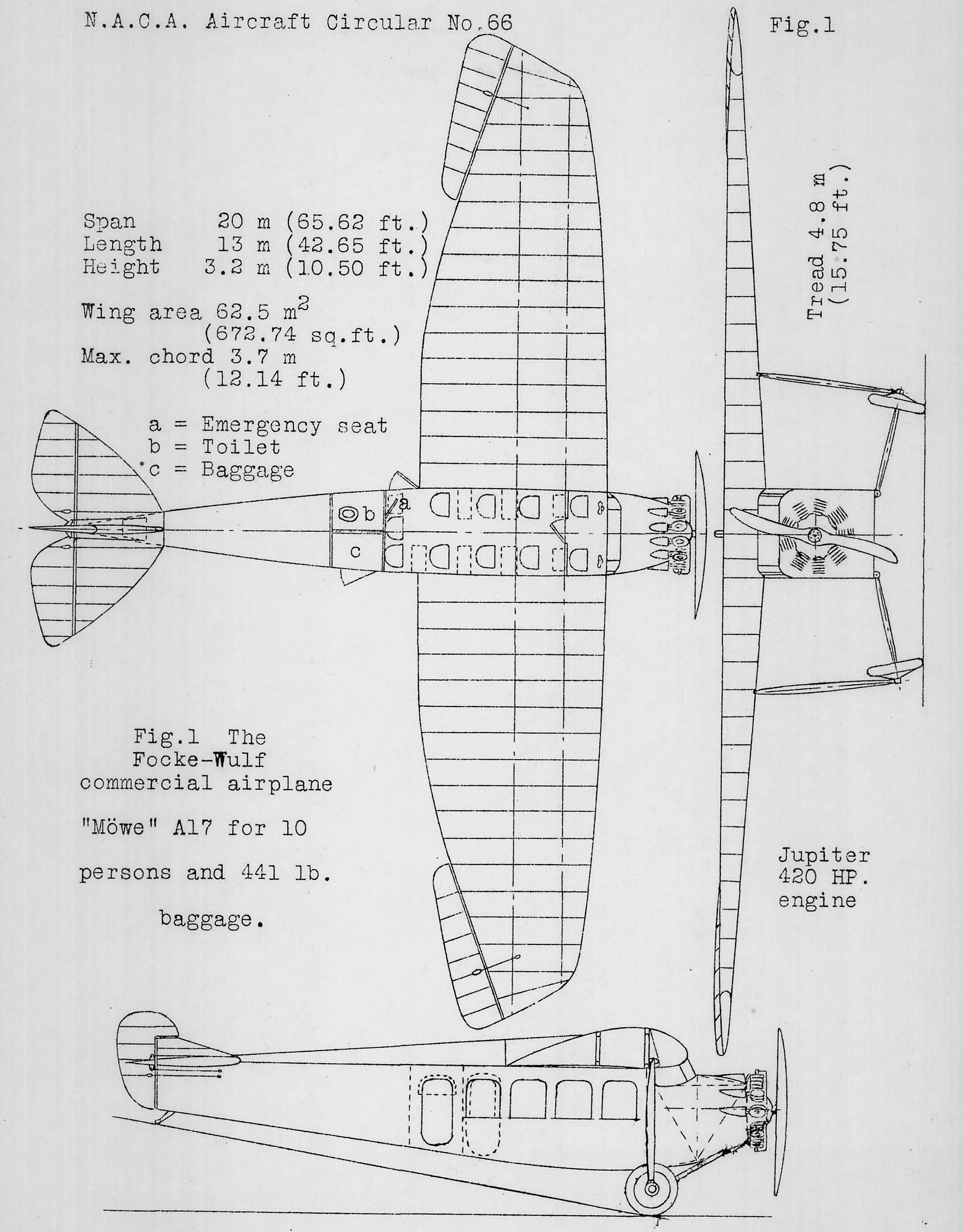
Focke-Wulf A 17 3-view drawing from NACA Aircraft Circular No.66

Data from European Transport Aircraft since 1910, National Advisory Committee for Aeronautics

General characteristics

- Crew: two
- Capacity: eight passengers
- Length: 14.63 m (48 ft 0 in) (tail up)
- Wingspan: 20.00 m (65 ft 7 in)
- Wing area: 62.5 m^{2} (673 sq ft)
- Empty weight: 2,450 kg (5,401 lb)
- Gross weight: 4,000 kg (8,818 lb)
- Powerplant: 1 × Siemens Jupiter VI , 360 kW (480 hp)

Performance

- Maximum speed: 201 km/h (125 mph, 109 kn)
- Cruise speed: 167 km/h (104 mph, 90 kn)
- Range: 800 km (500 mi, 430 nmi)
- Service ceiling: 4,500 m (14,800 ft)

== See also ==
Aircraft of comparable role, configuration, and era

- Fokker F.XIV
- Kalinin K-5
- Latécoère 28
- Messerschmitt M 18
- Nieuport-Delage NiD 540
- Stout 2-AT Pullman
