= Georg Wulf =

Georg Wulf (1895-1927) was a German aviation pioneer and aircraft manufacturer.

== Biography ==
Wulf was born 17 May 1895 in Bremen. He was the son of a customs agent. He attended the high school on Dechanat Street.

Around 1910, Henrich Focke, with the help of his brother Wilhelm Focke, built a simple canard airplane of steel tubes and bamboo. It was powered by an eight-horsepower engine. Their attempts to fly on the Bremen paradeground failed, but they awoke an interest of the 15 year old Wulf.

Wulf was so enthusiastic about flying that he quit before he graduated from high school and instead made airplanes. He offered to work with Focke, which Focke accepted. Starting in 1911, Wulf and Focke designed aircraft and built them with the simplest means. In 1912 they completed a flyable monoplane, which Wulf flew.

The treaty ending World War I prohibited aircraft with engines from being built in Germany, until 1923. But Wulf and the Focke brothers secretly continued to build their aircraft in the basement of the Focke family house. After 1921 Wulf flew the aircraft they built. In 1923 Wulf also worked as a flight instructor. Also in 1923, the "'Bremen Aircraft Construction Company (Bremer Flugzeugbau-Gesellschaft) was founded by Focke and Wulf, which was renamed Focke-Wulf- Aircraft Construction Inc. (Focke-Wulf-Flugzeugbau AG) a year later. Wulf was the managing director, the technical director of operations, and a pilot.

As a preliminary study, they had built a light monoplane, which first flew in November 1921. This was followed by the known under the name Seagull and duck commercial aircraft.

== Death ==
On September 29 1927, Wulf died while testing a prototype of the F 19a Ente aircraft.

Wulf is buried in Bremen in the Osterholzer cemetery (field E), near the bridge to the North Chapel.

=== Honors ===
- In the district of Bremen-Neustadt the Georg-Wulf-Straße was named after him in 1955 near Bremen Airport.
- The "Georg-Wulf-Straße" in Berlin-Schönefeld bears his name.

== Bibliography ==
- Monika Porsch: "Bremer Straßenlexikon", complete edition. Schünemann, Bremen 2003, ISBN 3-7961-1850-X.
- Herbert Schwarzwälder: The Great Bremen Lexicon . Edition Temmen, Bremen 2003, ISBN 3-86108-693-X.
