= Aircraft cabin =

Aircraft's section in which passengers travel

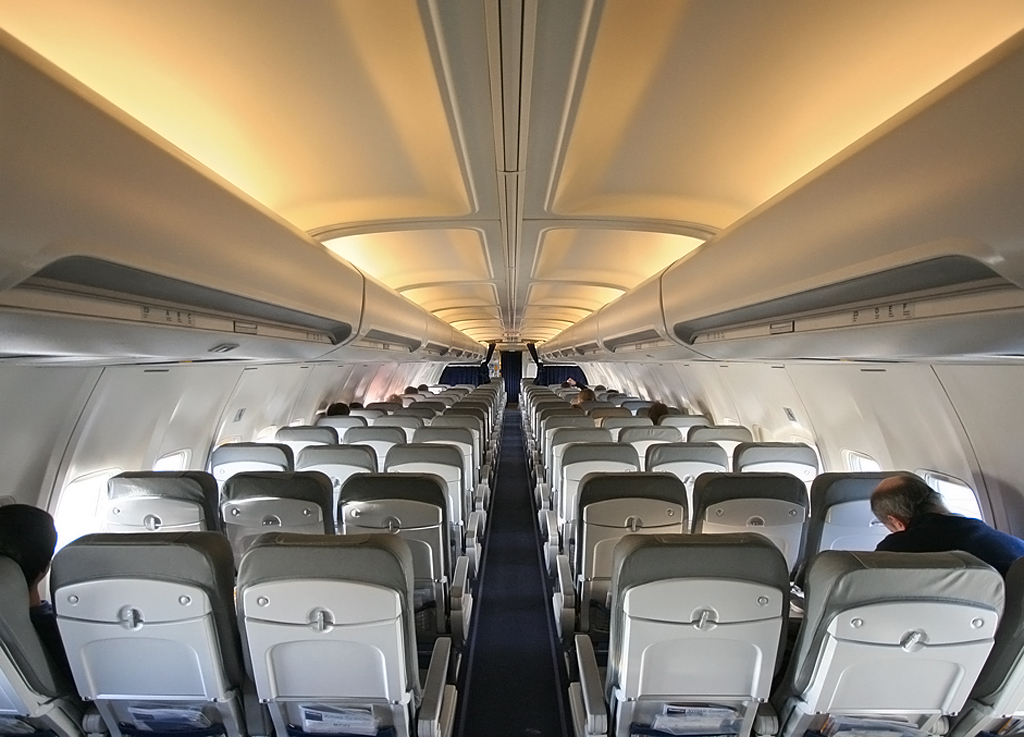
Cabin of a Boeing 737 (Economy class) with typical seating arrangement

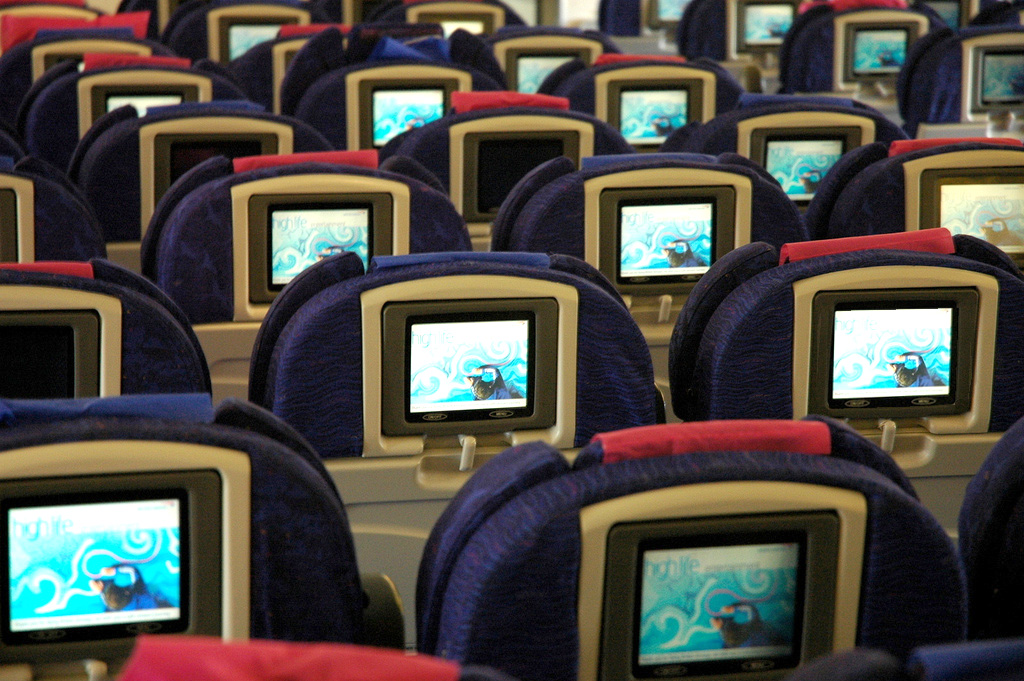
The British Airways World Traveller Cabin

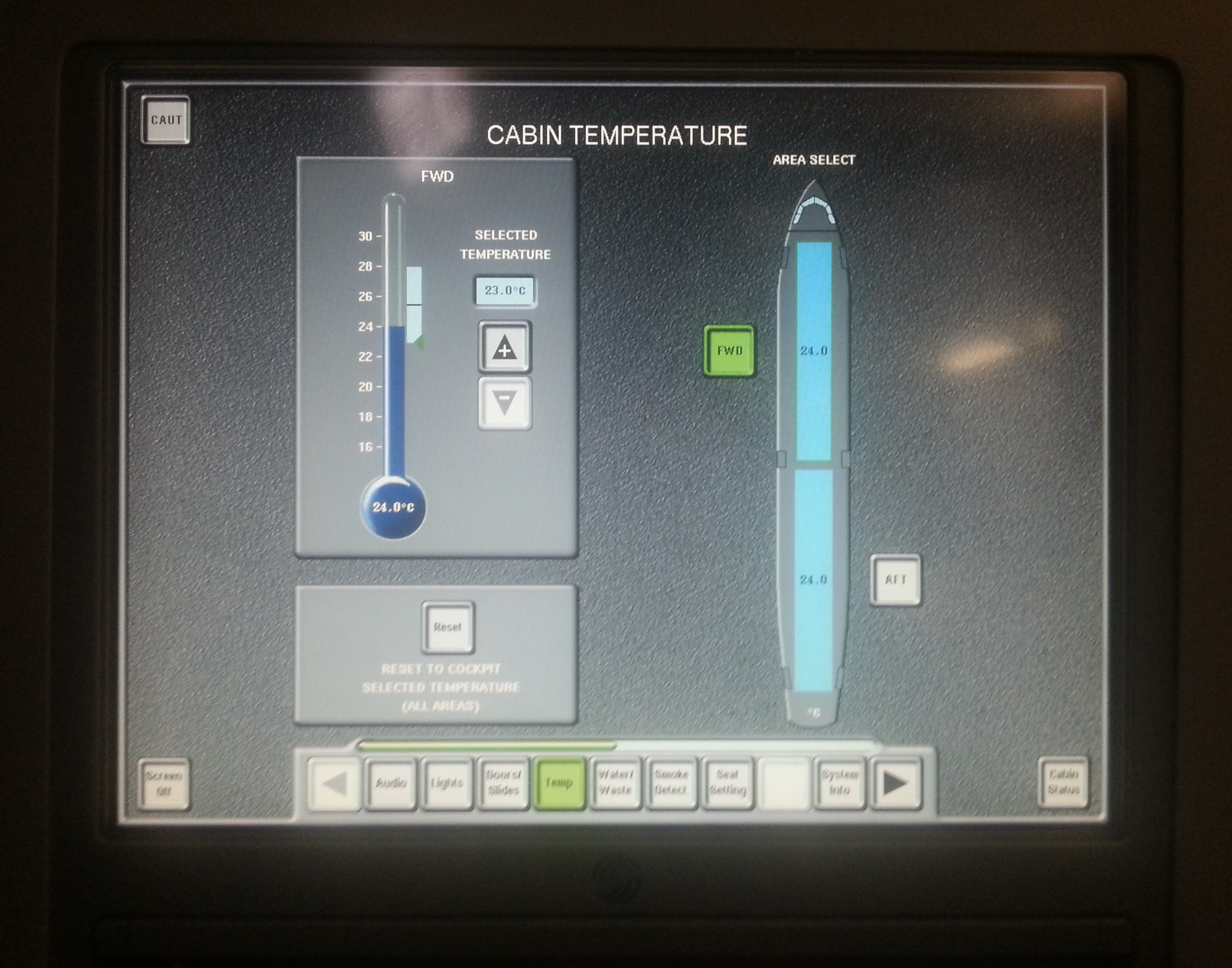
Aircraft cabin control system on board an Airbus A319

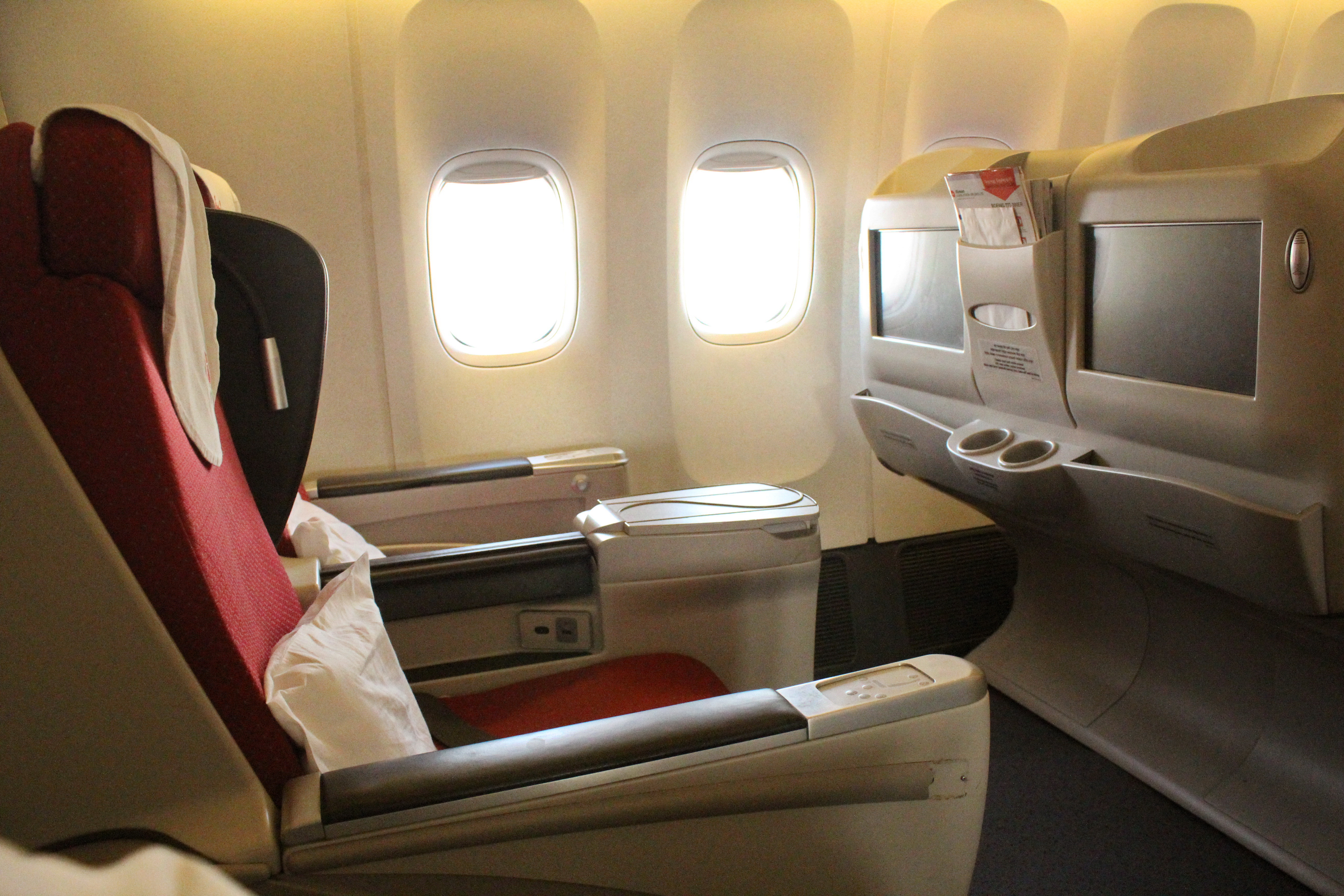
"Executive Class" cabin of Boeing 777-300ER operated by Biman

An aircraft cabin is the section of an aircraft in which passengers travel. Most modern commercial aircraft are pressurized, as cruising altitudes are high enough such that the surrounding atmosphere is too thin for passengers and crew to breathe.

In commercial air travel, particularly in airliners, cabins may be divided into several parts. These can include travel class sections in medium and large aircraft, areas for flight attendants, the galley, and storage for in-flight service. Seats are mostly arranged in rows and aisles. The higher the travel class, the more space is provided. Cabins of the different travel classes are often divided by curtains, sometimes called class dividers. Passengers are not usually allowed to visit higher travel class cabins in commercial flights.

Some aircraft cabins contain passenger entertainment systems. Short and medium haul cabins tend to have no or shared screens whereas long and ultra-long haul flights often contain personal screens.

== Evolution ==
Business class is almost replacing first class: 70% of 777s had first-class cabins before 2008 while 22% of new 777s and 787s had one in 2017. Full-flat seats in business-class rose from 65% of 777 deliveries in 2008 to nearly 100% of the 777s and 787s delivered in 2017, excepted for low-cost carriers having 10% premium cabin on their widebodies. First-class seats were halved over the past 5–10 years, typically from eight to four. To differentiate from business class, high-end first class move to full-height enclosures like Singapore Airlines, Emirates, and Etihad. Business class became the equivalent of what first class was a few years ago.

In 2017, 80% of the 777s and 787s delivered had a separate premium economy with one or two fewer seats across than regular economy class. In economy class, 2 in (5 cm) slimmer seats with composite frames and thinner upholstery can add legroom or allow more seating. While ground or more often satellite internet connection is available at lower cost due to competition, only 25–30% of carriers outside U.S. offer inflight connectivity. LED lighting can support different scenarios like boarding, food service, shopping, branding or chronobiology through simulated sunset or sunrise. First- and business-class are refurbished every 5–7 years compared to 6–10 years for economy.

Market ($ million)
Cabin upgrades	2016	2026
Interior modifications	2600	4600
Avionics/systems	765	1365
painting	539	862
AD/service bulletins	302	410
cabin connectivity	190	323

A 337 seats cabin (36 business, 301 economy) in a 787-10 for Singapore Airlines costs $17.5 million each. Emirates invested over $15 million each to refurbish its 777-200LR in a new two-class configuration in 55 days initially then 35 days.

=== Mezzanine seating ===
In the mid-2000s, Formation Design Group proposed using the taller wide-body cabins to layer the bed and seat arrangements for higher density. Revealed at Aircraft Interiors Expo 2012, Factorydesign devised a double-deck system of pods for 30% more density, between premium economy and business class. In 2015, Airbus filed a patent for a double-deck business class cabin, to monetize the vertical space.

== Cabin pressurization ==
Cabin pressurization is the active pumping of compressed air into the cabin of an aircraft in order to ensure the safety and comfort of the occupants. It becomes necessary whenever the aircraft reaches a certain altitude, since the natural atmospheric pressure would be too low to supply sufficient oxygen to the passengers. Without pressurization, one could suffer from altitude sickness including hypoxia.

If a pressurized aircraft suffers a pressurization failure above 10,000 feet (3,000 meters), then it could be deemed an emergency. Should this situation occur, the aircraft should begin an emergency descent, and oxygen masks should be activated for all occupants. Aboard the majority of passenger aircraft, the passengers' oxygen masks are activated automatically if the cabin pressure falls below the atmospheric pressure equivalent of 14,000 feet (4,300 meters).

== Travel class ==
=== First class ===
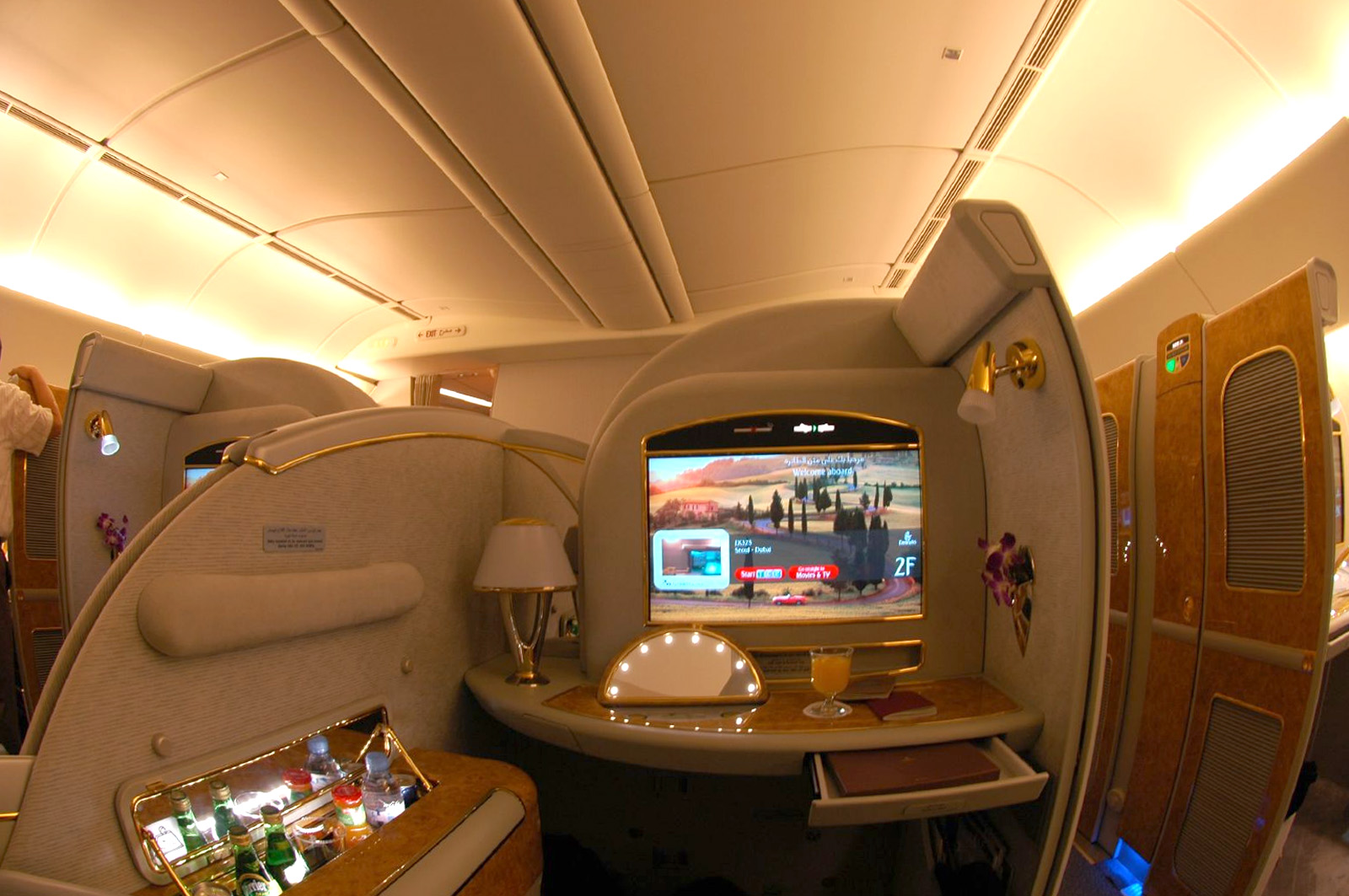
Emirates 777-200LR First Class Suite

The first class section of an airplane is the class with the best service, and it is typically the highest priced. The services offered are superior to those in business class, and they are available on only a small number of long flights. First class is characterized by having a larger amount of space between seats (including those that can be converted into beds), a personal TV set, high quality food and drink, personalized service, privacy, and providing travelers with complimentary items (ex. pajamas, shoes and toiletries). Passengers in this class have a separate check-in, access to the airline's first-class lounge, preferred boarding, or private transportation between the terminal and the plane. Due to its high cost, there are few airlines that offer this service.

=== Business class ===
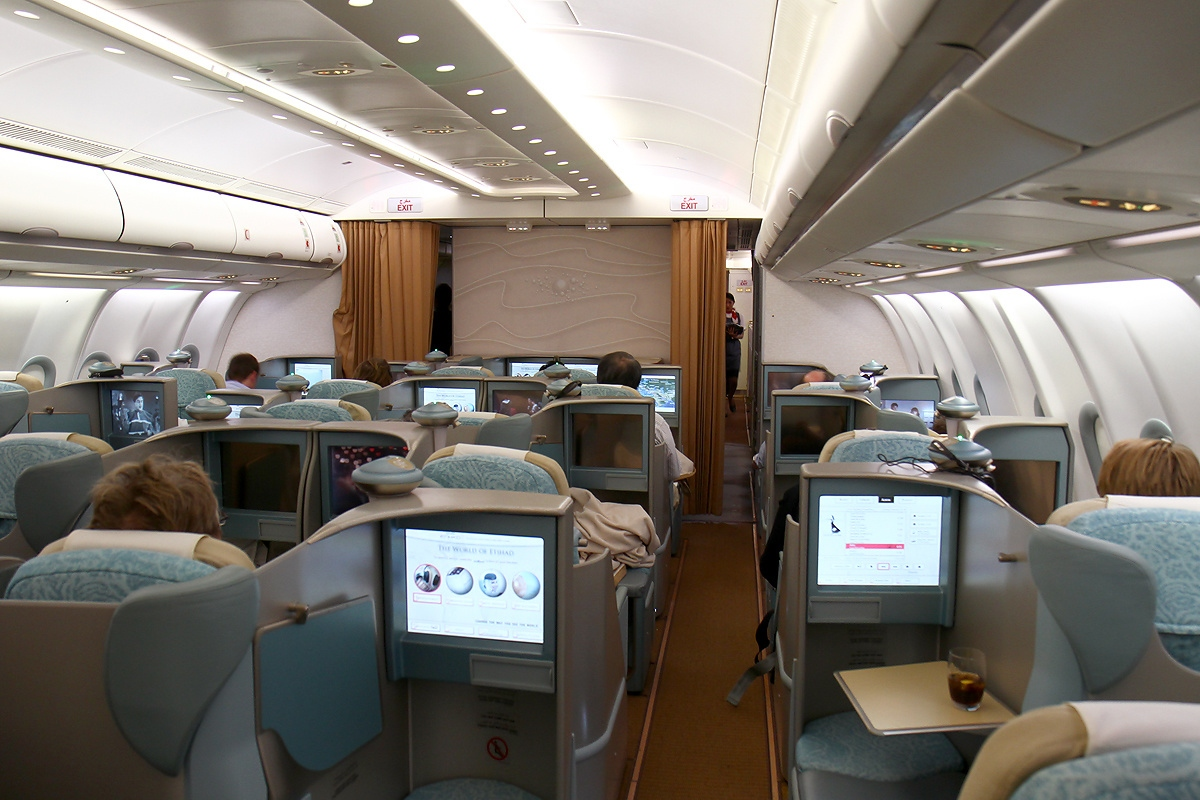
Etihad Airways' Business Class Cabin

Business class is more expensive, but it also offers more amenities to travelers than the classes below it. These may include better food, wider entertainment options, more comfortable seats with more room to recline and more legroom, among others.

=== Premium economy class ===
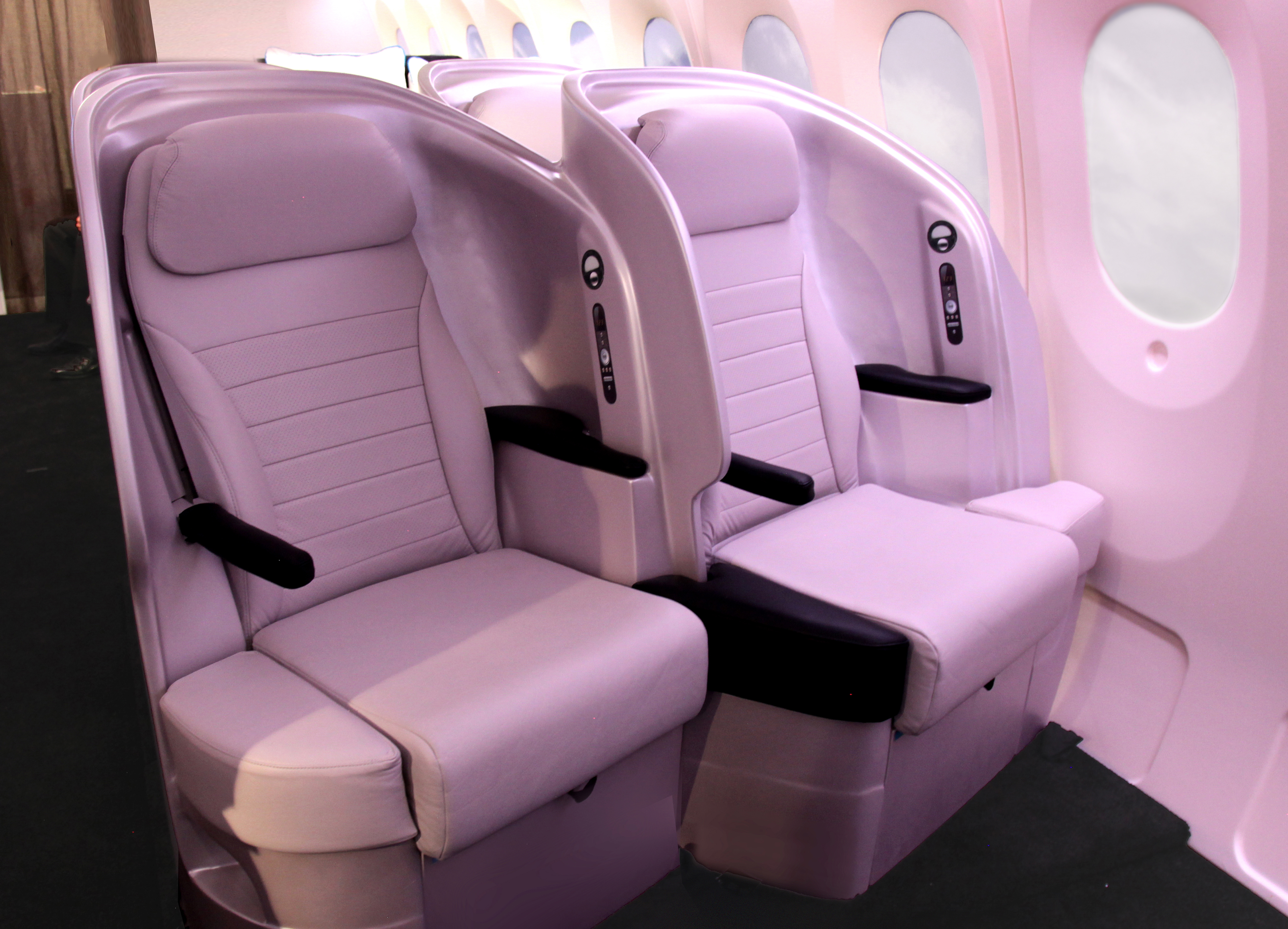
Premium Economy Spaceseats on Air New Zealand

Premium economy class is a travel class offered by some airlines in order to provide a better flying experience to the economy traveler, but for much less money than business class. It is often limited to a few extras such as more legroom, as well as complimentary food and drinks. On board Air Canada, Premium Economy comes with wider seats (3 inches on the Boeing 777-300) (2 inches on the Boeing 787), more recline (3 inches more than economy), a fold-down foot rest, an amenity kit, premium food and drinks on long-haul international flights, and much more legroom.

=== Economy class ===
Economy class is the airline travel class with the lowest ticket price, as the level of comfort is lower than that of the other classes. This class is primarily characterized by the short distance between each seat, and a smaller variety of food and entertainment.

== VIP configuration ==
VIP configuration of an aircraft has enclosed separated sections for use by select passenger(s) for use as an office space, meeting area and notably sleeping quarters from seated passengers.

The most notable is Air Force One, with a private sleeping area, office space and conference rooms for the president of the United States.

== See also ==
- Gaspers
- Shirt-sleeve environment
- Uncontrolled decompression
- Wide-body aircraft interiors
