= 1937 in aviation =

This is a list of aviation-related events from 1937:

== Events ==
- Over Tushino airfield near Moscow, Soviet aircraft fly in precise formations spelling "LENIN", "STALIN," and "USSR."
- Cuba establishes a naval aviation arm.
- Kawasaki Heavy Industries moves its airframe manufacturing business into a new subsidiary, the Kawasaki Aircraft Engineering Company Ltd.

=== January ===
- January 12 – Adventurer and filmmaker Martin Johnson, of Martin and Osa Johnson fame, is killed along with four others in the crash of Western Air Express Flight 7 in mountainous terrain near Saugus, California.
- January 19 – Howard Hughes sets a new record by flying from Los Angeles to New York City in 7 hours, 28 minutes and 25 seconds.

=== February ===
- Manchukuo officially establishes the Manchukuo Imperial Air Force. In fact, it had existed unofficially since 1932.
- Hans von Ohain begins ground-testing a turbojet engine.
- February 3 – In the Spanish Civil War, a Nationalist (rebel) attack on Málaga begins, supported by an Italian "legionary" air force of about 100 aircraft.
- February 18 – Nationalist ace Joaquín García Morato plays a major role in an air-to-air engagement in which a Nationalist force of Fiat CR.32 fighters defeats a Republican (loyalist) one of Polikarpov I-15s, shooting down eight I-15s. The battle gives the Nationalists temporary air superiority during the Battle of Jarama and demonstrates that the CR.32s could defeat the I-15s – which previously had dominated the CR.32s over Spain – if handled courageously and imaginatively.
- February 19 – Flying in heavy rain, the Airlines of Australia Stinson Model A City of Brisbane (registration VH-UHH) crashes in the McPherson Range in Australia′s Lamington National Park. Both pilots and two of the five passengers die in the crash, and another passenger dies in a fall over a waterfall after he goes for help. The Australian author Bernard O'Reilly becomes a national hero in Australia when he hikes into the wilderness on February 28 to look for the plane and discovers the airliner's wreckage and the two surviving passengers on March 1.
- February 22–26 – The "International Circuit of the Oases" event at Almaza Airport in Egypt. 41 competitors take part in two races – a 1303-mile (2097 km) handicap race, and a speed race. Competing aircraft arrived from Austria, Belgium, Czechoslovakia, Egypt, France, Germany, Great Britain, Italy, Poland, Romania.

=== March ===
- The French aircraft manufacturer Dewoitine is nationalized, becoming Société nationale des constructions aéronautiques du Midi (SNCA du Midi, or SNCAM).
- March 5 – Imperial Airways opens a new flying boat base at Hythe, Hampshire, England.
- March 8 – A Nationalist offensive begins against Guadalajara, Spain, with support by Italian forces, including 50 fighters and 12 reconnaissance planes.
- March 16
  - At the Avignon-Pujaut Military Training Center at Avignon, France, French aviator and parachutist Edith Clark is killed when the new model of French Air Force parachute she is using fails to open on her third jump of the day and 200th of her career. She falls to her death from an altitude of 500 meters (1,640 feet).
  - Led by 2nd Bombardment Group commander Lieutenant Colonel Robert Olds, four Y1B-17 Flying Fortress bombers make a flight in which they take off from Langley Field, Virginia, and fly over 20 cities — including Augusta, Maine; Cleveland, Ohio; Pittsburgh, Pennsylvania; and Richmond, Virginia — before landing at Langley Field after an 11-hour flight.
- March 17 – Amelia Earhart flies a Lockheed Electra from Oakland, California, to Wheeler Field, Territory of Hawaii, on the first leg of an attempted circumnavigation of the world, making the flight in 15 hours 47 minutes.
- March 17–29 – The Pan American Airways Sikorsky S-42B Samoan Clipper makes the first aerial survey flight to link the continental United States, the Territory of Hawaii, and New Zealand, piloted by the airline's chief pilot, Edwin Musick. After an overnight flight on March 17–18 from Alameda, California, to Honolulu, where it pauses for engine repairs until March 23, the plane continues the flight with stops at Kingman Reef and American Samoa before arriving on March 29 at Auckland, where 30,000 people greet it and its crew.
- March 18 – The Bossi-Bonomi Pedaliante achieves the first sustained 1-km (0.621-mile) human-powered flight, with a catapult launch.
- March 20 – As Earhart tries to leave Hawaii for the second leg of her around-the-world flight, her Electra is severely damaged in an aborted takeoff from Luke Field on Ford Island in Pearl Harbor, bringing her circumnavigation attempt to an end.
- March 22
  - Spanish Nationalist leader Francisco Franco orders his National Aviation (Aviación Nacional) force to begin a bombing campaign against the Basques in northern Spain.
  - The 71-year-old English aviator and ornithologist Mary Russell, Duchess of Bedford, dies in the crash of her de Havilland DH.60GIII Moth Major into the North Sea off Great Yarmouth, England. Her body is never recovered.
- March 25 – The Transcontinental and Western Air Douglas DC-2 NC13730 crashes nose first into a gully near Clifton, Pennsylvania, due to atmospheric icing during a flight from Camden Central Airport in Camden County, New Jersey, to Allegheny County Airport outside Pittsburgh, Pennsylvania, killing all 13 people on board. Doris Hammons, the first TWA flight attendant – known at the time as an "air hostess" – killed in an airplane crash, is among the dead.
- March 28 – Taking off in thick fog from Archerfield, Queensland, Australia, for an early-morning mail and newspaper flight, the Airlines of Australia Stinson Model A Lismore (registration VH-UGG) crashes into trees, lands inverted, and explodes, killing its two-man crew.
- March 31 – A Spanish Nationalist ground offensive begins against the Basques, supported by 80 German aircraft based at Vitoria-Gasteiz and 70 Spanish Nationalist and Italian aircraft based elsewhere in northern Spain. Opposing them are 20 to 30 Basque aircraft. On the first day, German Junkers Ju 52s conduct the first terror bombing and strafing of an undefended town in Europe, killing 248 people in Durango.
- March 31-April 4 – Supporting Nationalist forces, 40 to 50 aircraft per day bomb Ochandiano, Spain.

=== April ===
- Flying a Breda Ba.88 Lince, Breda chief test pilot Furio Niclot sets two speed-over-distance world records, averaging 517 km/h (321.25 mph) over a 100 km (62.1 mile) distance and 475 km/h (295.15 mph) over a 1000 km (621 mile) circuit.
- The Martin M-130 flying boat Hawaii Clipper completes Pan American World Airways' 100th transpacific flight without a single passenger fatality. It is considered a remarkable safety record at the time.
- American Export Airlines is founded.
- April 6–9 – Masaaki Iinuma (pilot) and Kenji Tsukagoshi (flight mechanic and navigator) fly the Mitsubishi Ki-15 J-BAAI Kamikaze 15,366 km (9,542 statute miles) from Tachikawa, Japan, to Croydon Airport in London in a record 94 hours 17 minutes 56 seconds, of which 51 hours 17 minutes 23 seconds is spent in the air at an average speed of 162 km/h (101.2 mph). It is the first Japanese-built aircraft to fly to Europe.
- April 11 – Trans-Canada Airlines – the future Air Canada – is established. It will begin flight operations on September 1.
- April 12 – Sir Frank Whittle ground-tests the first jet engine designed to power an aircraft at the British Thomson-Houston factory in Rugby, England.
- April 13 – Frank Hawks flies the Hawks Miller HM-1 Time Flies about 1,100 miles (1,771 km) from Hartford, Connecticut, to Miami, Florida in 4 hours 55 minutes. After lunch, he flies the plane from Miami to Newark, New Jersey, in 4 hours 21 minutes. The aircraft is damaged on landing at Newark and Hawks opts not to rebuild it.
- April 20 – A new Nationalist advance begins in Vizcaya province in northern Spain, supported by a preliminary aerial bombardment.
- April 26 – Four Heinkel He 111 and 23 Junkers Ju 52 bombers of the German Condor Legion attack Guernica, Spain, in the first example of "carpet bombing" to demoralize a civilian population. Over three hours, the bombers drop 45,000 kg (99,207 lbs) of bombs, destroying 70% of the city and killing at least 1,000, and perhaps as many as a third (over 1,600 people) of its inhabitants. Messerschmitt Bf 109 and Heinkel He 51 fighters also strafe the town to kill any inhabitants they see. The town burns for three days. The damage shocks Spanish Nationalist military leaders, and the Condor Legion engages in no further area bombing during the Spanish Civil War.
- April 27 – Henrich Focke and Gerd Achgelis found the Focke-Achgelis company to design and manufacture helicopters at Hoykenkamp, Germany.

=== May ===
- In the Spanish Civil War, the Republicans have the technological and numerical superiority in the air, with about 450 aircraft, including 150 Soviet and 50 other fighters and 60 Soviet and 40 other bombers; they have lost about 150 aircraft since the war began in July 1936. The Nationalists have a little less than 400 aircraft, with about 150 flown by Spanish pilots, about 100 in the German Condor Legion, and about 120 in the Italian "legionary air force."
- May 6 – The Hindenburg disaster occurs when the German dirigible Hindenburg catches fire and is destroyed at the end of a transatlantic flight while attempting to dock with a mooring mast at Naval Air Station Lakehurst in Lakehurst, New Jersey. Of the 97 people on board, 35 are killed, as is one member of the ground crew.
- May 8 – Lieutenant Colonel Mario Pezzi of Italy sets a new world altitude record of 15,655 meters (51,362 feet) in a Caproni Ca.161.
- May 8–14 – Dick Merrill and his copilot Jack Lambie make the Hearst Publishing-sponsored "Anglo-American Goodwill Coronation Flight" – history's first transatlantic commercial round-trip flight – in the Lockheed Model 10E Electra Daily Express. Departing New York City on May 8 carrying photographs of the Hindenburg disaster to London so that Hearst newspapers can be the first in the United Kingdom to publish them, they return on May 14 with photographs of the May 10 coronation of King George VI so that Hearst newspapers can be the first to publish photographs of the coronation in the United States. Merrill will win the 1937 Harmon Trophy for the flight, and footage from the flight will be used to make the 1937 movie Atlantic Flight, in which Merrill and Lambie star.
- May 10 – With its engine turned off, a Focke-Wulf Fw 61 helicopter makes the first landing for an Fw 61 using autorotation.
- May 22 – The Spanish Republican Air Force sends fighters on a risky flight across Nationalist-controlled territory to Republican bases in northern Spain to support the Basque defense against Nationalist forces there; seven of them arrive safely. Over the next several weeks, 50 more Republican aircraft – Polikarpov I-15 and I-16 fighters and Polikarpov R-5 light bombers – will make the trip, with 45 arriving safely.
- May 24 – A Spanish Republican air raid against Palma de Mallorca, Mallorca, hits the Italian armed merchant cruiser Barletta – a unit of the non-intervention patrol around Spain.– killing six of her crew.
- May 26 – Spanish Republican air raids by Soviet pilots narrowly miss the German patrol ship Albatross at Palma and damage the German "pocket battleship" Deutschland off Ibiza, killing 31 and wounding 66 aboard Deutschland.

=== June ===
- The Latécoère 521 flying boat Lieutenant de Vaisseau Paris makes a nonstop flight from France to Natal, Brazil, then returns to France via the North Atlantic Ocean.
- June 1 – Transcontinental and Western Air introduces sleeper berths for airline passengers in the United States.
- June 3 – The Spanish Nationalist commander General Emilio Mola dies when his plane crashes on the hill of Alcocero de Mola, near Burgos.
- June 11 – An aerial bombardment by German aircraft of the Condor Legion and Italian aircraft precedes a renewed Nationalist offensive against the Basque defensive perimeter around Bilbao, Spain.
- June 12 – About 70 German and Italian aircraft attack Basque defenses around Bilbao over the course of several hours.
- June 14 – German aircraft of the Condor Legion strafe refugees from Bilbao as they flee along the road to Santander.
- June 16 – Pan Am and Imperial Airways begin regular passenger flights by flying boat between Port Washington, New York, and Bermuda.
- June 18–20 – Transpolar flight of Chkalov, Baydukov and Belyakov: Soviet aviators Valery Chkalov, G. F. Baidukov, and A. V. Belyakov from Moscow in the Soviet Union to Vancouver, Washington, in the United States via the North Pole in a Tupolev ANT-25.
- June 25 – Flying a Focke-Wulf Fw 61, Ewald Rohlfs sets two new helicopter world records, an altitude record of 2,439 meters (8,002 feet) and an endurance record of 1 hour 20 minutes 49 seconds.
- June 26 – Flying a Focke-Wulf Fw 61, Ewald Rohlfs sets three new helicopter world records: a straight-line distance record of 16.4 kilometers (10.2 miles), a closed-circuit distance record of 80.604 kilometers (50.055 miles), and a straight-line speed record of 122.553 km/h (76.105 mph) over a 20-kilometer (12.4-mile) course.
- June 27 – The British Airline Pilots' Association is founded.
- June 30 – During a 2¼-hour flight in the Bristol Type 138A, Royal Air Force Flight Lieutenant M. J. Adam sets a Fédération Aéronautique Internationale-homologated world altitude record of 16,440 meters (53,937 feet). The cockpit canopy cracks, but he is saved by his pressure suit.

=== July ===
- In Chicago, Illinois, United Air Lines hires Ella Gertrude McMullen as the first airline dietitian.
- July 1 – Varney Speed Lines renames itself Continental Air Lines (later changed to Continental Airlines).
- July 3 – Amelia Earhart and navigator Fred Noonan disappear over the Pacific Ocean on a flight from Lae, New Guinea, to Howland Island, and are never seen again.
- July 3–6 – Pan American World Airways and Imperial Airways flying boats conduct joint survey flights over the Atlantic Ocean in preparation for the commencement of regular services.
- July 6 – A Spanish Republican offensive against Brunete begins, supported by 300 aircraft; the Republicans will use Polikarpov I-15 fighters at night for the first time during the battle, opposing night-bombing German Heinkel He 111 bombers. The Nationalists redeploy German aircraft of the Condor Legion from north to central Spain to support Nationalist ground forces around Brunete.
- July 7
  - The Marco Polo Bridge Incident begins the Second Sino-Japanese War.
  - Curtiss receives the largest order placed with an airplane manufacturing company since 1918 when the United States Army Air Corps orders 210 P-36 Hawks
- July 8 – Varney Speed Lines is renamed Continental Air Lines, which later will be changed to Continental Airlines.
- July 11
  - The Imperial Japanese Army and Imperial Japanese Navy agree that if a full-scale war breaks out with China, the army will have the responsibility for operations in northern China and the navy in central and southern China.
  - German Messerschmitt Bf 109 fighters appear over the battlefield around Brunete, Spain, proving themselves much more effective than Republican Polikarpov I-15 fighters, although outnumbered by the I-15s.
- July 12–14 – Soviet aviators Mikhail Gromov, Andrey Yumashev, and Sergey Danilin establish a new unrefueled flight distance record of 10,148 kilometers (6,302 miles), flying from Moscow in the Soviet Union to San Jacinto, California, in the United States via the North Pole in a Tupolev ANT-25, covering the distance in 62 hours 17 minutes.
- July 18 – Supporting Nationalist forces, German fighters of the Condor Legion begin to dominate the air over the Battle of Brunete, shooting down 21 Republican aircraft during the day. The Nationalists will hold the advantage in the air over central Spain for the rest of the Spanish Civil War.
- July 21 – Arbitrating the Royal Navy's request that control of British naval aircraft be transferred to it from the Royal Air Force for the first time since the dissolution of the Royal Naval Air Service in 1918, Sir Thomas Inskip recommends to the British Cabinet that the Royal Navy have full control of its aircraft. His decision, which becomes known as the "Inskip Award," will take nearly two years to implement.
- July 25 – The Battle of Brunete ends. During the 20-day-long battle, the Republicans have lost about 100 aircraft, while the Nationalists have lost 23. The appearance of the German Messerschmitt Bf 109 fighter and Heinkel He 111 bomber and the Italian Savoia-Marchetti SM.79 bomber in numbers during the battle signals the end of Republican air superiority in the Spanish Civil War.

=== August ===
- August 6
  - In response to a request by Spanish Nationalist leader Francisco Franco for the Italian armed forces to attack ships in the Mediterranean Sea bringing aid to the Republicans, Italian aircraft based on Mallorca bomb a British, a French, and an Italian merchant ship near Algiers.
  - Pan American Airways receives the Collier Trophy for "establishment of the transpacific airline and the successful execution of extended overwater navigation and the regular operations thereof." Chief Executive Officer Juan Trippe accepts the trophy on behalf of the company from President Franklin D. Roosevelt.
- August 7 – Italian aircraft from Mallorca bomb a Greek ship in the Mediterranean Sea.
- August 12
  - Mallorca-based Italian aircraft sink a Danish cargo vessel in the Mediterranean Sea.
  - Soviet 6-men crew under captaincy of Sigizmund Levanevsky in Bolkhovitinov DB-A aircraft starts its long distance transpolar flight from Moscow to Fairbanks, Alaska.
- August 13 - the radio communication with the Levanevsky's crew breaks off after the aircraft encountered adverse weather conditions and suffered failure of its end right engine; all subsequent search operations failed
- August 14
  - On the second day of the Battle of Shanghai, Nationalist Chinese aircraft attack Imperial Japanese Navy ships anchored in the Huangpu River during the Second Sino-Japanese War.
  - Vice Admiral Kiyoshi Hasegawa orders Imperial Japanese Navy aircraft carriers to begin strikes against the coast of China, beginning several months of such operations.
  - A Nationalist offensive in northern Spain against Basque forces defending Santander, begins, supported by 70 German – including the latest models, being evaluated in combat for the first time – 80 Italian, and 70 Spanish Nationalist aircraft. Republican forces opposing them have only 33 fighters – only 18 of them modern Soviet aircraft – and 11 reconnaissance planes. The Nationalist aerial bombardment will overwhelm the defenders of Santander, which will fall to the Nationalists on August 26.
- August 14–15 – Imperial Japanese Navy Mitsubishi G3M bombers based at Taihoku on Formosa and Ōmura on Kyūshū conduct over-ocean raids on Nationalist Chinese bases 400 to 500 miles (644 to 805 km) inland, demonstrating an operational range that astonishes both foreign observers and those of the Imperial Japanese Army. It is the first transoceanic bombing raid in history.
- August 15 – Deutsche Luft Hansa begins seaplane services between the Azores and New York with the assistance of seaplane tenders stationed along the route.
- August 24 – The Republicans launch an offensive against Nationalist in forces in Aragon, supported by about 200 aircraft; the opposing Nationalists have only 15 Heinkels. The Nationalists redeploy 20 Fiat CR.32 fighters commanded by the ace Joaquín García Morato, 20 Savoia-Marchetti SM.79 bombers, and 20 cargo aircraft from northern Spain to the area to bolster the defense.
- August 26 – Mallorca-based Italian aircraft bomb a British merchant ship off Barcelona, Spain.

=== September ===
- The Mitsubishi A5M (Allied reporting name "Claude") fighter enters service, allowing the Imperial Japanese Navy to gain air superiority in the Second Sino-Japanese War. The Japanese soon gain control of the skies over Shanghai.
- A French military leader tells the British that "a veritable forest of guns" over the Maginot Line will prevent the German Luftwaffe from intervening in a land war between France and Germany.
- September 1
  - Supported by 250 aircraft, Spanish Nationalist forces begin an offensive against Republicans in Asturias. The absence of the Condor Legion, which is deployed in Aragon, is felt; Nationalist progress is slow for the first six weeks.
  - Trans-Canada Airlines – the forerunner of Air Canada – begins flight operations. Its first flight is from Vancouver, British Columbia, Canada, to Seattle, Washington, in the United States.
- September 17 – At a conference at Nyon, Switzerland, to address Italian attacks on merchant ships in the Mediterranean Sea attended by Bulgaria, Egypt, France, Germany, Greece, Romania, the Soviet Union, and Turkey, delegates agree that a British and French naval patrol in the Mediterranean west of Malta previously authorized to sink submarines suspected of attacking merchant ships also will be authorized to attack aircraft suspected of engaging in anti-shipping strikes. The agreement is in response to Italian attacks on merchant ships by aircraft based at Mallorca.
- September 19–22 – Imperial Japanese Navy Mitsubishi A5M ("Claude") fighters conduct a successful campaign to eliminate Chinese air resistance over Nanking.

=== October ===
- Imperial Japanese Navy bomber operations against Nanking resume, and continue through the autumn.
- The French assure General John Vereker, the British Chief of the General Staff, that they plan to reinforce their antiaircraft artillery in the Maginot Line to counter Germany's superior aircraft such that Germany "would require an unrealizable supremacy of machines to get over the antiaircraft defenses."
- The French Farman F.223.1 Laurent Guerrero (registration F-APUZ) sets a record for aircraft in its class by flying 1,000 km (621 miles) with a 10,000-kg (22,046-pound) payload.
- October 15 – The Condor Legion is redeployed to assist the Spanish Nationalist offensive in Asturias, which immediately speeds up greatly. German pilots led by Adolf Galland experiment with the "carpet bombing" of Asturian positions, in which the Germans fly in close formation very low, approach the enemy positions from the rear, and release their bombs simultaneously.
- October 20 – The Spanish Republican Navy submarine C-6 is scuttled at Gijón, Spain, after suffering damage in a Nationalist air attack.
- October 21 – Nationalist aircraft sink the Basque Auxiliary Navy destroyer Ciscar at Gijón.
- October 25 – Flying a Focke-Wulf Fw 61, Luftwaffe test pilot Hanna Reitsch sets a new helicopter straight-line distance world record with a 108.974-kilometer (67.673-mile) flight in Germany from Bremen to Berlin.

=== November ===
- To disrupt the Soviet Union's efforts to supply China during the Second Sino-Japanese War, Imperial Japanese Navy bombers begin strikes on Lanzhou. Navy and Imperial Japanese Army bomber strikes on Lanzhou will occur for the next several years.
- November 5 – The German Ministry of Aviation authorizes the Heinkel firm's P.1041 design as the winner of the "Bomber A" strategic bomber competition for the Luftwaffe, issuing the airframe type number 8-177 to it. It simultaneously requires the new design to be capable of medium-angle dive bombing attacks – which Reichsmarschall Hermann Göring, the commander-in-chief of the Luftwaffe, would not rescind until September 1942.
- November 12 – The twice-postponed Vuelo Panamericano Pro Faro A Colon (Pan American Flight for the Columbus Lighthouse; also styled Por el Faro de Colón), departs from Ciudad Trujillo in the Dominican Republic a month behind schedule, bound on its first leg for San Juan Puerto Rico, in three Cuban Stinson Reliant aircraft (named Niña, Pinta, and Santa María) and one Curtiss-Wright CW-19 (named Colón) of the Dominican Army's aviation arm. The flight is a planned 21,000-mile (34,000 km), 52-city, 26-country goodwill tour of the Americas to drum up support and funding for a proposed lighthouse in the Dominican Republic honoring Christopher Columbus.
- November 16 – A Sabena Junkers Ju 52 en route from Cologne to London via Brussels crashes near Ostend, Belgium, killing all 11 people on board. Among the dead are the Grand Duke and eight-months pregnant Grand Duchess of Hesse and their two small sons.
- November 20 – The French Farman F.223.1 Laurent Guerrero (registration F-APUZ) sets out from Istres, France, for Santiago, Chile, where it arrives 2 days 10 hours 41 minutes later.
- November 22 – Heinkel He 119 V4, the fourth prototype of the German Heinkel He 119, makes a world record flight for an aircraft of its class, recording an air speed of 505 km/h (314 mph) with a payload of 1,000 kg (2,205 lb) over a distance of 1,000 km (621 mi).
- November 23 – During the Great Purge, Soviet Air Force commander-in-chief Comandarm Yakov Alksnis is arrested.

=== December ===
- Flying a Breda Ba.88 Lince, Breda chief test pilot Furio Niclot sets two speed-over-distance world records, averaging 554 km/h (344.24 mph) over a 100-km (62.1-mile) distance and 524 km/h (325.6 mph) over a 1000-km (621-mile) circuit.
- Major air battles take place between Imperial Japanese Navy and Nationalist Chinese aircraft over Nanchang on December 9 and December 22, during which the Japanese claim the destruction of 29 Chinese aircraft in the air and 25 on the ground.
- December 9 – During combat over Nanchang, an Imperial Japanese Navy Mitsubishi A5M ("Claude") fighter loses a third of its right wing when it is rammed by a Nationalist Chinese Curtiss Hawk, but flies 200 miles (320 km) back to base without further mishap.
- December 12 – The Panay Incident occurs, when Imperial Japanese Navy Yokosuka B4Y (Allied reporting name "Jean") bombers and Nakajima A4N fighters sink the U.S. Navy gunboat USS Panay (PR-5) and three nearby Standard Oil tankers on the Yangtze River near Nanking.
- December 15 – A Spanish Republican offensive in the area of Teruel, Spain, begins. The ensuing Battle of Teruel will last until February 22, 1938, and involve 120 fighters, 80 bombers, and 100 other aircraft on the Republican side and 150 fighters, 100 bombers, and 110 other aircraft on the Nationalist side.
- December 23 – Piloted by Edwin Musick, the Pan American Airways Sikorsky S-42B flying boat Samoan Clipper departs Honolulu, inaugurating the first scheduled air mail and air cargo service between the United States and New Zealand, with stops at Kingman Reef and Pago Pago, American Samoa.
- December 29
  - A Spanish Nationalist counteroffensive against Republican forces during the Battle of Teruel begins with the support of German aircraft of the Condor Legion. The Condor Legion has had to redeploy in order to support the counteroffensive, and its personnel are becoming weary of the constant changes of front required by Nationalist military operations.
  - Tragedy strikes the Vuelo Panamericano Pro Faro A Colon (Pan American Flight for the Columbus Lighthouse; also styled Por el Faro de Colón) — a flight of three Cuban Stinson Reliant aircraft (named Niña, Pinta, and Santa María) and one Curtiss-Wright CW-19 (named Colón) of the Dominican Army's aviation arm which had departed Ciudad Trujillo in the Dominican Republic on November 11 on a planned 21,000-mile (34,000 km), 52-city, 26-country goodwill tour of the Americas intended to drum up support and funding for a proposed lighthouse in the Dominican Republic honoring Christopher Columbus — when all three Cuban planes collide with one another in strong winds about 12 miles (19 km) from Cali, Colombia, soon after taking off from Cali to fly to Panama. The crashes kill all seven Cuban participants in the flight — six aviators and a Havana journalist — leaving the Dominican plane and its two-man crew, who arrive safely in Panama, as the flight's only survivors. Before the crashes, the four planes since departing Ciudad Trujillo had made stops at San Juan, Puerto Rico; Caracas, Venezuela; Port of Spain, Trinidad, Paramaribo, Surinam; Belém, Fortaleza, Natal, Recife, Bahia, and Rio de Janeiro, Brazil; Montevideo, Uruguay; Buenos Aires, Argentina; Santiago, Chile; La Paz, Bolivia; Lima, Peru; and Bogotá and Cali, Colombia. The Government of Mexico quickly promises three planes to the flight so that it can continue its itinerary with four planes as originally intended, but the remainder of the flight is cancelled and the Domninican plane eventually returns to the Dominican Republic.
- December 30 – The French Latécoère 521 flying boat Lieutenant de Vaisseau Paris sets a world record by carrying a payload of 18,000 kg (39,682 pounds) to 2,000 meters (6,562 feet) over Biscarosse, France.

== First flights ==
- Arado Ar 95
- Arado Ar 195
- Bellanca 14-7 Cruisair
- Bellanca 28-90
- Bellanca 28-92
- Beriev MBR-7
- Levasseur PL.107
- Mitsubishi B5M (Allied reporting name "Mabel")
- Piaggio P.50-I
- Polikarpov I-153
- Polikarpov VIT-1
- Savoia-Marchetti SM.75
- Early 1937 – Gwinn Aircar
- Summer 1937 – Arado Ar 196
- Late 1937 – Henschel Hs 127

=== January ===
- Nakajima B5N (Allied reporting name "Kate")
- January 13 – Fairey Fulmar
- January 15 – Beech Model 18

=== February ===
- February 9 – Blackburn Skua
- February 26 – Fiat G.50 Freccia
- February 28 – Mitsubishi Ki-30 (Allied reporting name "Ann")

=== March ===
- Kawasaki Ki-32 (Allied reporting name "Mary")
- March 3 – Luton Minor
- March 4 – Junkers EF 61
- March 10 – Hawker Henley
- March 20 – Miles M.14 Magister

=== April ===
- April 10 – Junkers Ju 88 V2 D-AREN
- April 11 – Junkers Ju 89
- April 20 – Curtiss XP-37

=== May ===
- Arado Ar 196
- Focke-Wulf Fw 187
- Miles M.9 Kestrel
- May 7 – Lockheed XC-35
- May 12 – Fairchild F-46
- May 20 – de Havilland Albatross
- May 25 – Gasuden Koken

=== June ===
- Aichi E11A
- June 11 – Kawanishi E11K
- June 12 – Farman F.223.1 F-APUZ Laurent Guerrero, prototype of the Farman F.223
- June 18 – de Havilland Don
- June 18 – Vought V-143
- June 19 – Airspeed Oxford
- June 22 – de Havilland Moth Minor

=== July ===
- Heinkel He 119
- July 3 – Dornier Do 24
- July 15 – Hamburger Flugzeugbau Ha 138, unsuccessful early prototype of the Blohm & Voss BV 138
- July 18 – Potez 661
- July 25 – Amiot 370
- July 27
  - Focke-Wulf Fw 200 prototype D-AERE
  - Short Mayo Flying-boat / seaplane composite
- July 29 – Lockheed Model 14 Super Electra

=== August ===
- Nakajima Ki-19
- August 11 – Boulton Paul Defiant prototype K8310
- August 24 – Fairchild 45-80
- August 25 – Sukhoi ANT-51, prototype of the Sukhoi BB-1, redesignated the Sukhoi Su-2 in 1942
- August 28 – Junkers Ju 90

=== September ===
- September 1 – Bell YFM-1 Airacuda
- September 2 – Grumman XF4F-2, prototype of the F4F Wildcat
- September 4 – Miles M.13 Hobby G-AFAW
- September 13 – Junkers Ju 88 V3 D-ASAZ
- September 30 – Blohm & Voss Ha 140

=== October ===
- ERCO 310, prototype of the ERCO Ercoupe
- October 12 – Hawker Hurricane production model with Rolls-Royce Merlin G engine
- October 15 – Boeing XB-15
- October 16
  - Fokker T.V
  - Short S.25 K 4774, prototype of the Short Sunderland
- October 23 – Focke-Wulf Fw 62

=== November ===
- November 27 – Martin 156

=== December ===
- Bellanca Cruisair
- Martin 162A Tadpole Clipper, piloted three-eighths scale flying mode of the Martin PBM Mariner
- December 2 – Brewster XF2A-1 (company designation B-139), prototype of the Brewster F2A Buffalo
- December 6 – Amiot 340.01, prototype of the Amiot 340
- December 17
  - Consolidated PB2Y Coronado
  - Luscombe 8
- December 24 – Macchi C.200
- December 27 – Farman NC.470

== Entered service ==
- Aeronca K
- Focke-Wulf Fw 58 with the German Luftwaffe
- Henschel Hs 126 with the German Luftwaffe
- Early 1937 – Mitsubishi A5M (Allied reporting name "Claude") with the Imperial Japanese Navy
- Spring 1937 – Farman F.222 with the French Air Force
- Late 1937 – Mitsubishi B5M (Allied reporting name "Mabel") with the Imperial Japanese Navy

=== January ===
- January 13 – Handley Page H.P.54 Harrow with the Royal Air Force's No. 214 Squadron

=== February ===
- Gloster Gladiator with No. 3 and No. 72 Squadrons, Royal Air Force (RAF)

=== March ===
- Bristol Blenheim with No. 114 Squadron, Royal Air Force
- March 4 – B-17 Flying Fortress with the United States Army Air Corps 2nd Bombardment Group
- March 9 – Armstrong Whitworth Whitley with No. 10 Squadron, Royal Air Force

=== April ===
- Vickers Wellesley
- Junkers Ju 87 with German Luftwaffe's I. Group, Sturzkampfgeschwader 162
- April 16 – Supermarine Stranraer

=== May ===
- Mitsubishi Ki-15 (Allied reporting name "Babs") with Imperial Japanese Army Air Force
- May 20 – Fairey Battle with No. 63 Squadron, Royal Air Force

=== June ===
- Aichi E11A (Allied reporting name "Laura")

=== August ===
- Nakajima Ki-19
- August 13 – Sikorsky XPBS-1

=== October ===
- Miles Magister
- Douglas TBD Devastator with United States Navy Torpedo Squadron (VT-3) aboard USS Saratoga (CV-3)

=== November ===
- Airspeed Oxford
- Dornier Do 24 with the Royal Netherlands Navy

=== December ===
- Hawker Hurricane with No. 111 Squadron, Royal Air Force at Northolt as the RAF's first monoplane fighter
- SB2U Vindicator with U.S. Navy Bombing Squadron 3 (VB-3) aboard USS Saratoga (CV-3)

== Retirements ==
- Curtiss P-6 Hawk by the United States Army Air Corps
- de Havilland M′pala, last variant of the Airco DH.9 in service, by the South African Air Force.

=== May ===
- Hall PH-1 by the United States Navy from squadron service; last served with Patrol Squadron 8 (VP-8); some aircraft remained in service as trainers

=== August ===
- Ford RR-5 by the United States Marine Corps, last Ford Trimotor in service with the U.S. Marine Corps.
