= Galeão 8 FG Guanabara =

Guanabara

General information
- Type: Experimental aircraft
- National origin: Brazil
- Manufacturer: Fokker do Brasil S.A. CTA (Centro Aerotécnico da Aeronáutica); IPD (Instituto de Pesquisas e Desenvolvimento)
- Number built: 1

History
- First flight: 1965

The Galeão 8 FG Guanabara, was a Brazilian low-wing, single-engined experimental airplane intend to be an executive aircraft to the Brazilian Air Force.

== Design and development ==
The Guanabara was based on the Fokker S.12 training aircraft, then manufactured at Fokker's factory in Brazil. It was proposed by technicians from the Ministry of Aeronautics. The main differences were the little retractable landing gear, newly designed canopy cabin, and additional fuel tanks at the wingtips.

The prototype was ready in April 1965, and flight testing began shortly thereafter. It proved to be very interesting, but problems included the limited passenger capacity and the complicated forward-proof contraction mechanism. This problem made engine maintenance more complicated. The prototype was abandoned, and sent to São José dos Campos, and stored at Department of Aerospace Science and Technology for a few months.

Later the same year, it was modified by Brazilian Air Force engineers, and new tests were performed, in which it was successful. However, it was again abandoned and scrapped.

== Specifications ==
Data from Taylor 1965, p. 13, Pereira 1997, p. 172

General characteristics

- Crew: 1
- Capacity: 4
- Length: 8.18 m (26 ft 10 in)
- Wingspan: 10.74 m (35 ft 3 in)
- Height: 3.11 m (10 ft 2 in)
- Wing area: 18.50 m^{2} (199.1 sq ft)
- Aspect ratio: 6:55
- Airfoil: NACA 2417 at root, NACA 2412 at tip
- Empty weight: 970 kg (2,138 lb)
- Gross weight: 900 kg (1,984 lb)
- Max takeoff weight: 1.510 kg (3 lb)
- Fuel capacity: 272.5 L (72.0 US gal; 59.9 imp gal)
- Powerplant: 1 × Lycoming O-540A1A six-cylinder horizontally-opposed air-cooled
- Propellers: 2-bladed Hartzell-8443-7 variable-pitch

Performance

- Maximum speed: 374 km/h (232 mph, 202 kn)
- Cruise speed: 267 km/h (166 mph, 144 kn)
- Never exceed speed: 337 km/h (209 mph, 182 kn)
- Wing loading: 81.6 kg/m^{2} (16.7 lb/sq ft)

== See also ==
- Neiva Regente
- Neiva Universal
- Weber W-151

Aircraft of comparable role, configuration, and era

- Niess 2-100
- IABSA Aerobatic 65-02
