= Weber W-141 =

W-141

General information
- Type: Utility aircraft
- Manufacturer: OMAREAL (Officina de Manutenção e Recuperação de Aviões, Ltda.)
- Designer: Willibald Weber
- Status: Cancelled project
- Number built: 3

History
- First flight: 1957

The Weber W-141 was a utility aircraft designed in Brazil in 1950. It was the second project developed by Weber, and made its maiden flight in 1957. It was the first all-metal, single-engine aircraft assembled nationally. During its initial tests it accumulated more than 40 flight hours in Botucatu. The prototype was sent to São José dos Campos, for certification at CTA and then to be serially manufactured. During the tests, the unfamiliar pilot had difficulties in flight and when landing he went over the runway limit, totally destroying the aircraft, the pilot was not injured.

Because of this accident the plane was not certified for serial production, and the project was abandoned. The other models were used by the Brazilian Air Force for testing.

== See also ==
- Muniz Casmuniz 52
- Weber W-151
- CTA Convertiplano

Aircraft of comparable role, configuration, and era

- Niess 2-100
- IABSA Premier 64-01
