= Focke-Achgelis Fa 325 =

German WWI transport aircraft

Fa 325

General information
- Type: Transport helicopter
- Manufacturer: Focke-Achgelis
- Designer: Heinrich Focke
- Status: paper project only
- Number built: 0

History
- First flight: 1942
- Developed from: Focke-Achgelis Fa 223

The Focke-Achgelis Fa 325 Krabbe was a proposed rotary wing transport designed in Nazi Germany by Focke-Achgelis in 1942.

== Design and development ==
Heinrich Focke began designing the Fa 325 for the Kriegsmarine, which was interested in a torpedo-armed helicopter. The design had four rotors, and was, effectively, two Focke-Achgelis Fa 223 Draches attached to each other, powered by two Bramo 301R-3 radial engines (BMW development of the Bramo 323 Fafnir engine for helicopter use). Empty weight was calculated at 9,250 kg (20,390 lb), and maximum take-off weight at 12,268 kg (27,046 lb). The Kriegsmarine leadership withdrew from the Fa 325 project in 1943, and Focke ceased further development.

== See also ==
- Focke-Achgelis Fa 223
- Focke-Achgelis Fa 330
- Focke-Achgelis Fa 269
