= Baumgartl PB-60 =

PB-60
- Baumgartl PB-60

General information
- Type: Experimental single-seat rotor kite
- National origin: Brazil
- Manufacturer: Fábrica do Galeão
- Designer: Paul Baumgärtl

History
- First flight: 1948

The Baumgärtl PB-60 was a 1940s experimental single-seat rotor kite designed and built by Austrian designer Paul Baumgartl for the Brazilian Air Ministry. The PB-60 was unpowered and had to be towed to become airborne and fly. It had a fixed tricycle landing gear with a simple unpowered two-blade rotor.

== Specifications ==
Data from The Illustrated Encyclopedia of Aircraft

General characteristics

- Crew: 1
- Empty weight: 45 kg (99 lb)
- Main rotor diameter: 6.10 m (20 ft 0 in)

== See also ==
Related lists

- Baumgartl PB-63
- Baumgartl PB-64
- I.P.D BF-1 Beija-Flor
- List of rotorcraft
