= Borgward Kolibri =

1950s German utility helicpoter

BFK-1 Kolibri
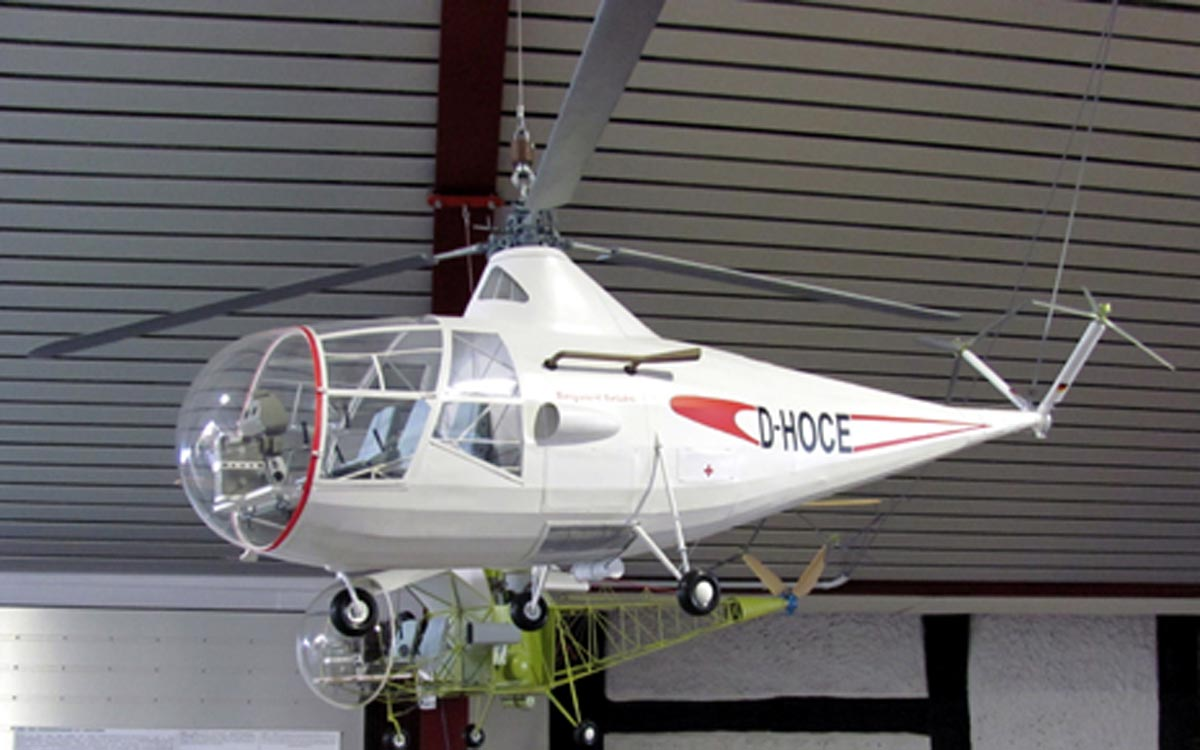
- Model of the Borgward-Focke BFK-1 Kolibri at the Bückeburg Helicopter Museum

General information
- Type: Utility helicopter
- National origin: German
- Manufacturer: Borgward

History
- First flight: 8 July 1958

The Borgward-Focke BFK-1 Kolibri, (Hummingbird) was a German three-seated utility helicopter built by Borgward, designed by Professor Heinrich Focke, the co-founder of Focke-Wulf, and was the first German helicopter after World War II. The helicopter first flew on 8 July 1958 in Bremen, piloted by Flugkapitän Ewald Rohlfs, who, on 26 June 1936, made the world's first flight of a helicopter, the Focke-Wulf Fw 61

== Design and development ==
Two prototypes were built; they had steel tubing fuselages, covered with metal and fabric and v-tails with tail rotors at their tips. The plywood covered main rotors had three blades with steel tubing spars. The helicopter had a six-cylinder air-cooled Lycoming Engines VO-435-A1B engine, producing 260 hp. The fuel tank was capable of holding 180L. The helicopter could be used for spraying in agriculture, and could carry up to 300 lbs. Development ended after the two prototypes, as Borgward went bankrupt shortly after in 1961.

== Specifications ==
Data from Jane's All the World's Aircraft 1960-61

General characteristics

- Crew: 1
- Capacity: 2 passengers
- Length: 8.3 m (27 ft 3 in) fuselage
- Height: 3.05 m (10 ft 0 in)
- Empty weight: 800 kg (1,764 lb)
- Max takeoff weight: 1,200 kg (2,646 lb)
- Fuel capacity: 180 L (47.6 US gal; 39.6 imp gal)
- Powerplant: 1 × Lycoming VO-435-A1B air-cooled six-cylinder, 190 kW (260 hp)
- Main rotor diameter: 9.4 m (30 ft 10 in)
- Main rotor area: 4.3 m^{2} (46 sq ft)

Performance

- Maximum speed: 160 km/h (99 mph, 86 kn)
- Cruise speed: 140 km/h (87 mph, 76 kn)
- Range: 320 km (200 mi, 170 nmi)
- Endurance: 3 hours
- Service ceiling: 4,500 m (14,800 ft) (absolute)
- Hover ceiling OGE: 600 m (2,000 ft)
- Rate of climb: 4 m/s (790 ft/min) (inclined) at sea level

1 m/s (3.3 ft/s) (vertical) at sea level
