= Baumgartl PB-64 =

PB-64

General information
- Type: Single-seat lightweight helicopter
- National origin: Brazil
- Manufacturer: Fábrica do Galeão
- Designer: Paul Baumgärtl

History
- First flight: 1950s

The Baumgärtl PB-64 was a 1950s single-seat helicopter designed and built by the Austrian-designer Paul Baumgärtl for the Brazilian Air Ministry. The PB-64 had an unusual rotor drive with two lightweight pulse jets mounted on the rotor, although not on the tips of the blades which was more normal. The engines were mounted at each end of a bar, at right-angles to the main rotor which also acted as a stabilizer bar. The main structure was a simple keel with a tricycle landing gear and an open seat for the pilot and a rudder on a simple tail boom.

== Specifications ==
Data from The Illustrated Encyclopedia of Aircraft

General characteristics

- Crew: 1
- Length: 4.60 m (15 ft 1 in)
- Height: 2.30 m (7 ft 7 in)
- Empty weight: 110 kg (243 lb)
- Gross weight: 227 kg (500 lb)
- Powerplant: 2 × ITA pulse-jets, 0.13 kN (30 lbf) thrust (13.60 kg thrust) each
- Main rotor diameter: 6.40 m (21 ft 0 in)

Performance

- Maximum speed: 130 km/h (81 mph, 70 kn)

== See also ==
Related lists

- Baumgartl PB-60
- Baumgartl PB-63
- I.P.D BF-1 Beija-Flor
- List of rotorcraft
