= Baumgartl PB-63 =

PB-63

General information
- Type: Single-seat lightweight helicopter
- National origin: Brazil
- Manufacturer: Fábrica do Galeão
- Designer: Paul Baumgärtl
- Number built: 1

History
- First flight: 1950s

The Baumgärtl PB-63 was a 1950s single-seat helicopter designed and built by the Austrian-designer Paul Baumgärtl for the Brazilian Air Ministry. The PB-63 was of a conventional pod and boom design with an open steel-tube construction and it had a single main rotor and a tail-mounted anti-torque rotor. It had a tricycle landing gear with the pilot in an open sided cabin at the front. The PB-63 was powered by an 85 hp (63 kW) Continental C85-12 flat-four piston engine.

== Specifications ==
Data from The Illustrated Encyclopedia of Aircraft

General characteristics

- Crew: 1
- Empty weight: 238 kg (525 lb)
- Gross weight: 360 kg (794 lb)
- Powerplant: 1 × Continental C85-12 flat-four piston engine , 63 kW (85 hp)
- Main rotor diameter: 6.00 m (19 ft 8 in)

Performance

- Maximum speed: 114 km/h (71 mph, 62 kn)
- Service ceiling: 2,285 m (7,500 ft)

== See also ==
Related lists

- Baumgartl PB-60
- Baumgartl PB-64
- I.P.D BF-1 Beija-Flor
- List of rotorcraft
