= Focke's wind tunnel =

Wind tunnel as a museum in Bremen, Germany

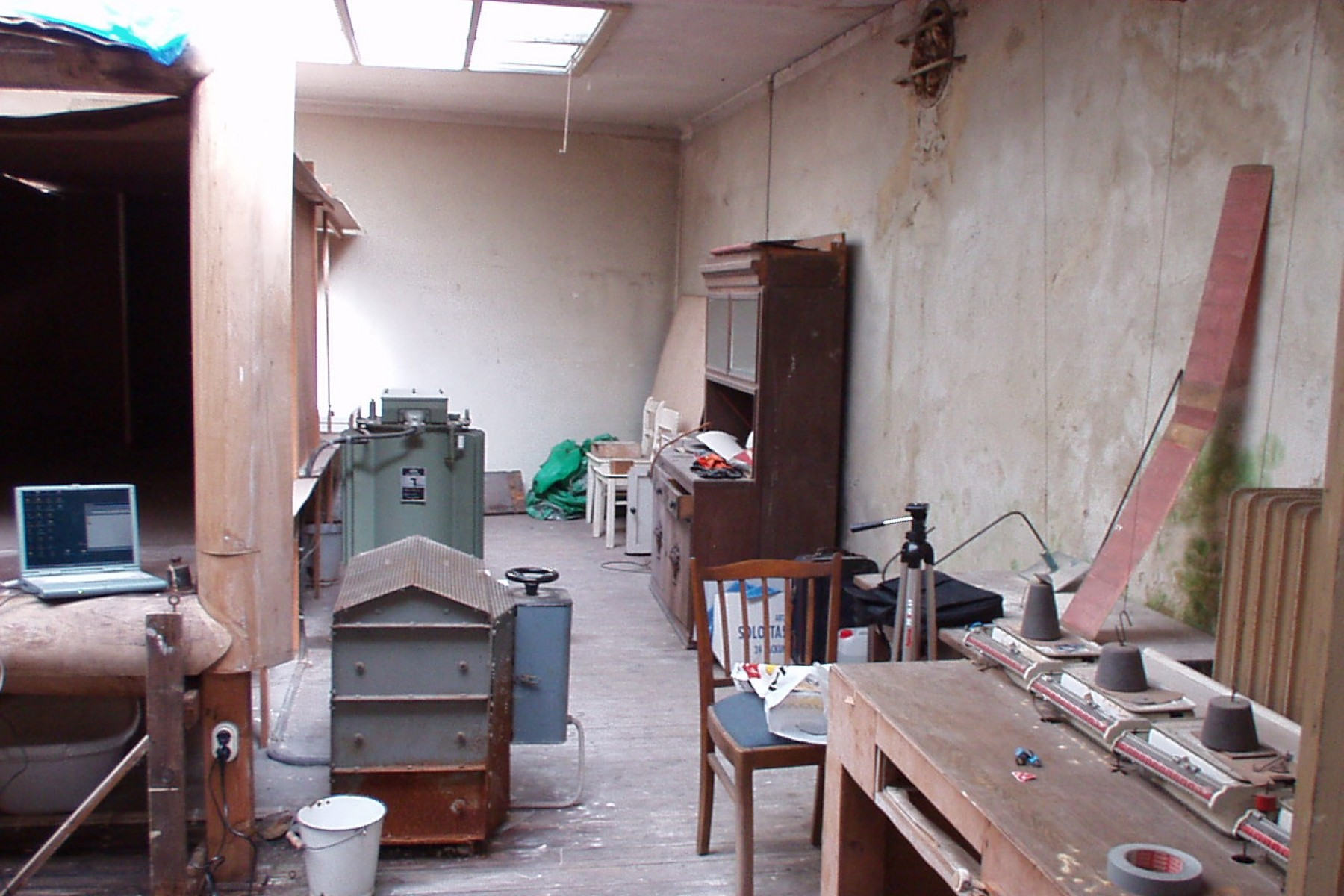
- Location: Germany
- Coordinates: 53°04′50″N 8°48′58″E
- Location of Focke's wind tunnel

Focke's wind tunnel is a fully operational wind tunnel in the former private laboratory of the aviation pioneer Henrich Focke (1890–1979), co-founder of Focke-Wulf and designer of the first fully controllable helicopter, the Focke-Wulf Fw 61. Henrich Focke built the laboratory in 1960 at the age of 70 in the city of Bremen. Until shortly before his death, in 1979, Focke continued aerodynamic studies in slow flight characteristics and the stability problem of helicopters. The rediscovery of his aerodynamic laboratory, together with its wind tunnel was regarded as a sensation for science and technology. Since 2004, the technical monument Focke Flight Laboratory is protected by law.

== Discovery ==
The lab was discovered in 1997 by former graduate student Kai Steffen, whom after having read the memoirs of Henrich Focke contacted the Focke family and located the laboratory in a backyard shed near the main station of Bremen. The laboratory had not been accessed for about 20 years.

The wind tunnel is a closed recirculating wind tunnel for subsonic speed range. It produces wind speeds up to 16 m per second and when discovered was still fully functional. The simplicity of the instrumentation is demonstrated by the use of kitchen scales to measure the forces acting in the wind tunnel, stove pipes and curtains controlling the airflow and reducing swirl. Everything in the lab was still in place as the 85-year-old Henrich Focke had left it, but the building was not in good condition.

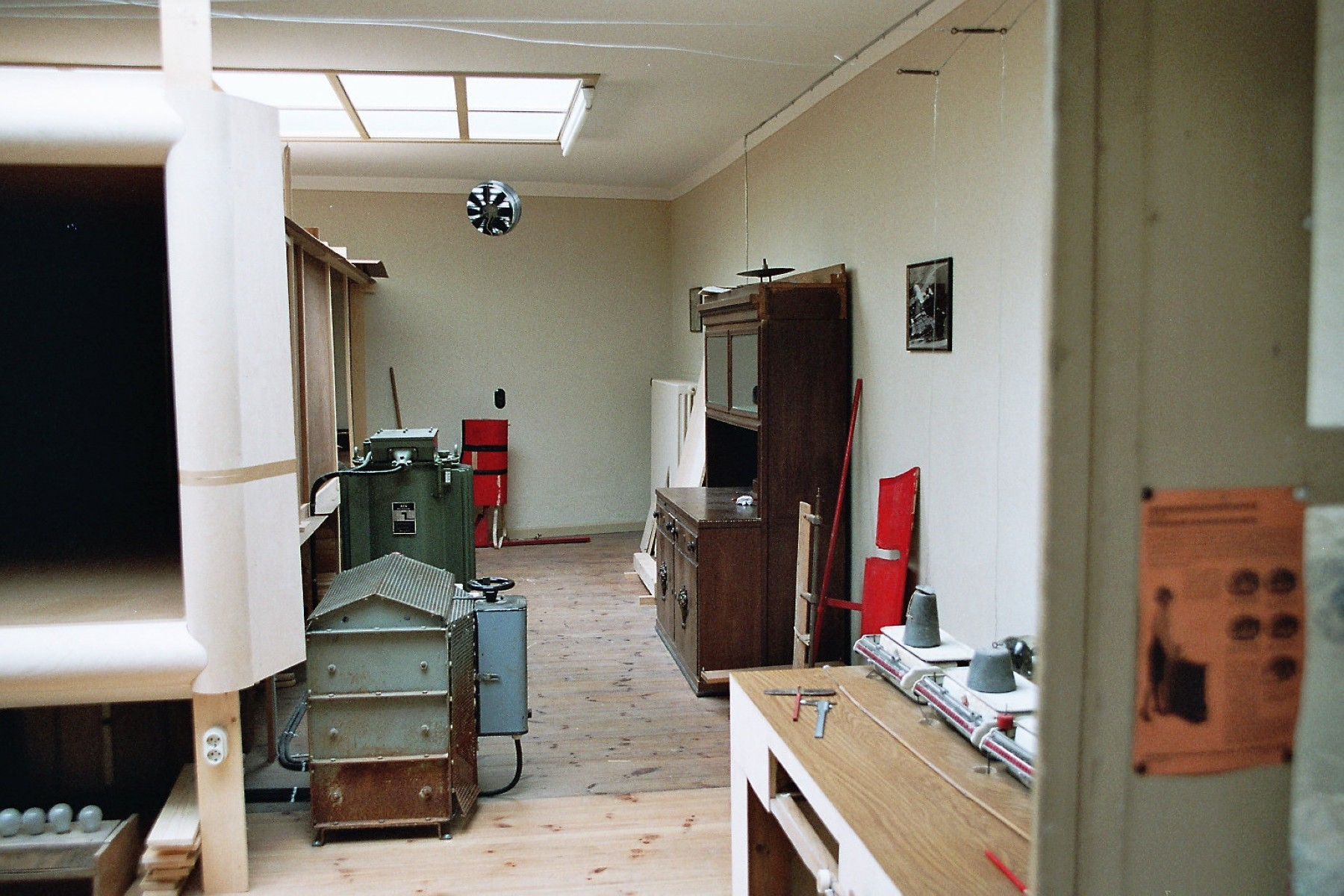
Museum and laboratory in the year 2006

== Museum ==
After renovation of the building and the restoration of the wind tunnel, the laboratory is now kept as Henrich Focke used it until 1975. Scientific experiments are still carried out by schools and universities.

The museum was opened in 2005, but the aerodynamic laboratory was not fully repaired until the Autumn of 2008. In addition, modern measurement technology, using a personal computer and electronic pressure cells, was installed.
