= CTA Convertiplano =

Convertiplano
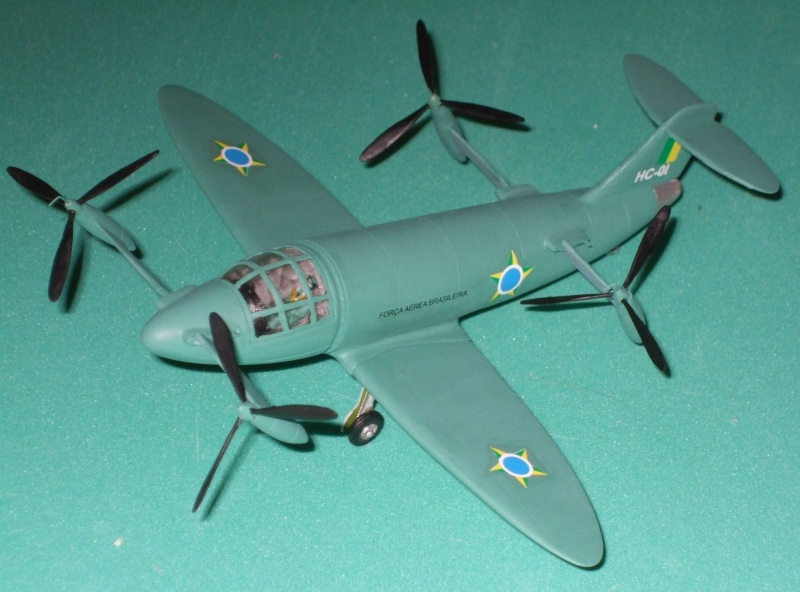

General information
- Type: VTOL aircraft project
- Manufacturer: Brazilian Air Force
- Designer: Henrich Focke
- Number built: 1

The Convertiplano is a cancelled Brazilian convertiplane project. It is based on the earlier Focke-Achgelis Fa 269.

Henrich Focke revived the design in the early 1950s on behalf of Brazil's Centro Técnico Aeroespacial (CTA), at the time the air force's technical center, who had contracted him to develop a convertiplane. The Convertiplano was built using the fuselage and wings of a Supermarine Spitfire Mk.XIV, serial RM874, acquired by the Brazilian Air Attaché's office in Brazil. Britain refused to supply the Armstrong Siddeley Double Mamba engine originally selected and the design was altered to accept a mid-mounted 2,200 horsepower (1,600 kW) Wright R-3350 Duplex-Cyclone radial engine, as used in the Lockheed Constellation, instead. This required a redesign of the transmission due to the increased weight and vibration.

Some 40 workers and US$8 million were devoted to the project.

The aircraft never entered service.

== Specifications (Convertiplano) ==
Dimensions:

- Wingspan: 37 feet 6 inches (11.43 m)
- Length: 35 feet 3 inches (10.74 m)
- Height: 15 feet 0 inches (4.57 m)
- Weight: Unknown

Performance Data:

- Top Speed: 310 mph (500 km/h)
- Range: 943 miles (1,517 kilometers) estimated

Thrust:

- HC-I Armstrong Siddeley Double Mamba ASMD.4 gas-turbine, 3,875 lbs (1,759 kgp)
- HC-Ib Wright R-3350-DA3 Turbo Compound 18-cylinder radial, 3,250 hp (2,424 kW)
- HC-II General Electric G.E. T-58 gas-turbines x 4, 3,000 lbs (1,360 kgp)

Crew: 2 for HC-I and HC-Ib, with accommodation for 6 passengers in HC-II

Armament: None.

== Notes ==
- "Focke Convertiplane". Flight, 1955, p.214

A Contrução Aeronáutica no Brasil 1910/1975 (Aeronautic Construction in Brazil 1910–1975), by Roberto Pereira de Andrade, Editora Brasiliense, 1976

Origem, Institucionalização e Desenvolvimento das Atividades Espaciais Brasileiras (1940-1980) (Origin, Institutionalization and Development of Brazilian Space Activities (1940-1980)), by Paulo Augusto Sobral Escada, Universidade Estadual de Campinas Instituto de Filosofia e Ciências Humanas, 2005.

Comando-Geral de Tecnologia Aeroespacial, CTA: Ciência e Tecnologia para a Defesa Nacional (Aerospace Technology General Command, CTA: Science and Technology for National Defense), by Brig Eng Venâncio Alvarenga Gomes Subdiretor de Empreendimentos, 62^{o} Forumde Debates Projeto Brasil, 2008.

"Uma Breve História das Atividades do Prof. Focke no Brasil" (A Brief History of Prof. Focke's Activities in Brazil) by Joseph Kovacs, ABCM Engenharia Associação Brasileira de Engenharia e Ciências Mecânicas, Volume 09 . Número 2. Abril . Setembro . 2003.

"Aeronautics in Brazil," by Walter Bartels, AIAB Aerospace Industries Association of Brazil, 2006.

"Professor Focke, Helicóptero e Convertiplano," (Professor Focke: Helicopter and Convertiplane) Gênios Desperdiçados do Brasil, Outubro de 2008.

"Condições Gerais para Incorporação de Tecnologia à Economia Brasileira," (Terms for Merger of Technology in the Brazilian Economy) by José Monir Nasser, 3a. Conferência Nacional de Ciência, Tecnologia e Inovação – CT&I para o Desenvolvimento, Seminário Temático Preparatório, Brasília, 22 de Março de 2005.

"Centro Técnico da Aeronáutica (Hoje: Comando-Geral de Tecnologia Aerospacial – CTA)," (Aeronautical Technical Center (Today: Aerospace Technology General Command - CTA)) by Mauro Gandra, Problemas Nacionais, Conferências Pronunciadas nas Reuniões Semanais do Conselho Técnico da Confederação Nacional do Comércio de Bens, Serviços e Turismo, 653, Vol. 55, Agosto 2009.

"Cronologia do Desenvolvimento Científico, Tecnológico e Industrial Brasilerio 1938-2003,"(Chronology of Scientific, Technological and Industry in Brazil 1938–2003) Homenagem do Ministério Desenvolvimento, Indústria e Comércio Exterior e do Serviço Brasileiro de Apoio às Micro e Pequenas Empresas Pelos 65 anos de Confederação Nacional da Indústria, Luiz Fernando Furlan, Ministro de Estado do Desenvolvimento Indústria e Comércio Exterior, 2005.

Luftwaffe Confidential: Fundamentals of Modern Aeronautical Design, by Claudio Lamas de Farias and Daniel Uhr, Eqip Werbung & Verlag GmbH, 2012
