= Focke-Achgelis Fa 225 =

Experimental German WWII rotary-wing glider

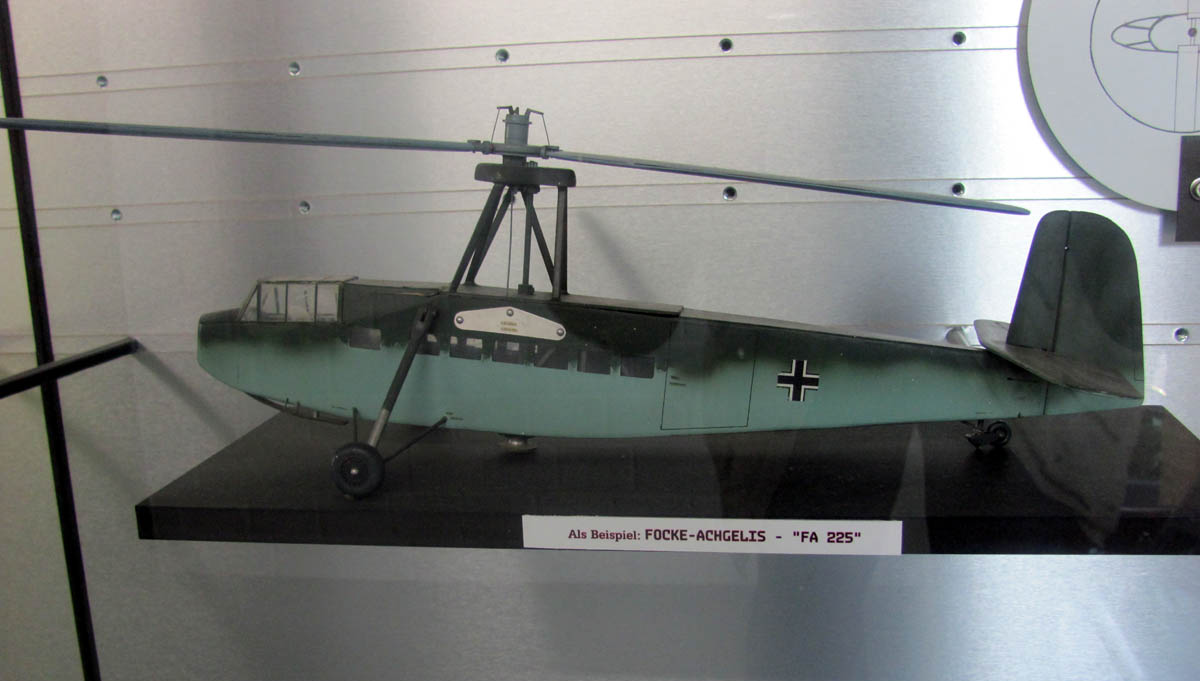
- A Picture of the Fa 225

General information
- Type: Assault glider
- Manufacturer: Focke-Achgelis
- Number built: 1

History
- First flight: 1942
- Developed from: DFS 230

The Focke-Achgelis Fa 225 was an experimental single-seat rotary wing glider built in Nazi Germany by Focke-Achgelis in 1942. Only a single example was constructed.

== Design and development ==
In the first half of the Second World War, the DFS 230B assault glider was used primarily to land troops and supplies, but was found of limited capability as it needed a relatively large landing area. The Fa 225 was conceived to marry the rotor of the Focke-Achgelis Fa 223 with the fuselage of the DFS 230B, allowing the glider to land in 18 m or less. The rotor was mounted on a framework of struts above the centre of gravity and strengthened long stroke undercarriage units were fitted either side and at the tail.

Towed behind a Junkers Ju 52/3m, Carl Bode piloted the Fa 225 on its first flight in 1943. Construction of the aircraft only took seven weeks, but series production was not proceeded with due to the relatively slow aero-towing speed and changes in operational doctrine.

== Specifications ==
Data from

General characteristics

- Crew: 1
- Capacity: several paratroopers
- Length: 11.24 m (36 ft 11 in) fuselage only
- Max takeoff weight: 2,000 kg (4,409 lb)
- Main rotor diameter: 12 m (39 ft 4 in)
- Main rotor area: 113.1 m^{2} (1,217 sq ft)

Performance

- Maximum speed: 190 km/h (120 mph, 100 kn) during towing by Ju 52/3m

== See also ==
- Focke-Achgelis Fa 223
- Focke-Achgelis Fa 330
- Focke-Achgelis Fa 269

== Bibliography ==
- Green, William (2010). Aircraft of the Third Reich. Vol. 1 (1st ed.). London: Aerospace Publishing Limited. ISBN 978-1-900732-06-2.
- Kay, Antony L.; J. Richard Smith (2002). German Aircraft of the Second World War: Including Helicopters and Missiles. Annapolis, MD: Naval Institute Press. ISBN 978-1557500106.
- Lepage, Jean-Denis G. G. (2009). Aircraft of the Luftwaffe, 1935-1945: An Illustrated Guide. Jefferson, NC: McFarland Books. ISBN 978-0786439379.
