= Focke-Achgelis Fa 284 =

Abandoned Nazi German helicopter project

Fa 284

General information
- Type: Heavy transport helicopter
- National origin: Nazi Germany
- Manufacturer: Focke-Achgelis
- Primary user: Luftwaffe
- Number built: 0

The Focke-Achgelis Fa 284 was a project to develop a large transport helicopter, designed in 1943 by Focke-Achgelis for use by the Luftwaffe. The helicopter was powered by two BMW 801 radial engines, driving transversely-mounted rotors, and was equipped with a large, detachable cargo pod for carrying loads.

The Fa 284 project was abandoned in late 1943, being replaced by a design for an enlarged version of the Fa 223 featuring a four-rotor arrangement; this project was also abandoned.

== Specifications ==
Data from Lepage 2009

General characteristics

- Capacity: 3,000 kilograms (6,600 lb) cargo in detachable pod
- Length: 18.6 m (61 ft 0 in)
- Wingspan: 37.3 m (122 ft 5 in)
- Powerplant: 2 × BMW 801 radial piston engine, 1,200 kW (1,600 hp) each
- Main rotor diameter: 2 × 16 m (52 ft 6 in)

Performance

- Cruise speed: 230 km/h (140 mph, 120 kn)

== See also ==
- Fairchild XC-120 Packplane

Aircraft of comparable role, configuration, and era

- Platt-LePage XR-1
