= Focke-Achgelis =

Defunct German helicopter manufacturer

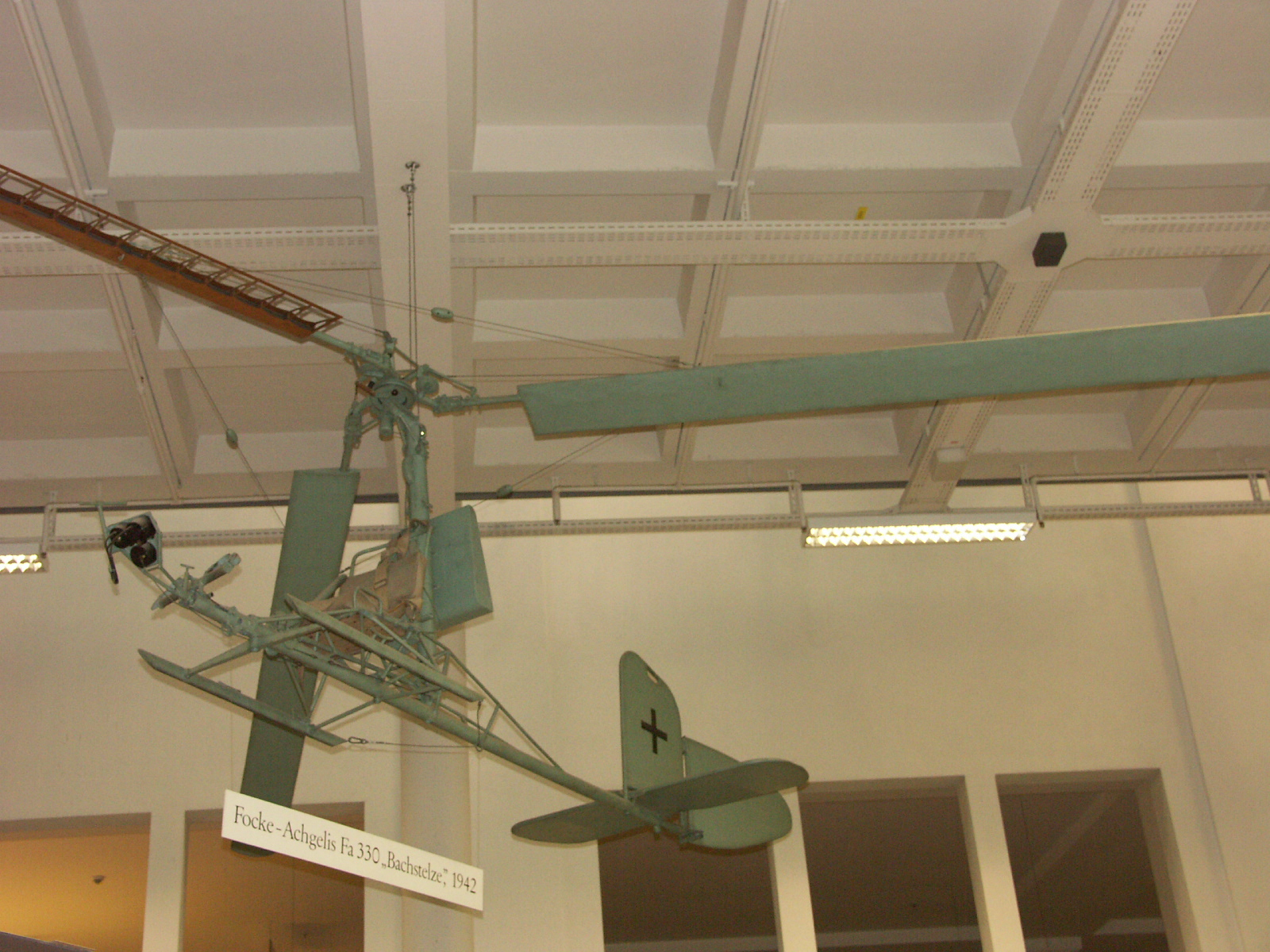
1943 Focke-Achgelis Fa 330

Focke-Achgelis & Co. G.m.b.H. was a German helicopter company founded in 1937 by Henrich Focke and Gerd Achgelis.

== History ==
Henrich Focke was ousted in 1936 from the Focke-Wulf company, which he had cofounded in 1924, due to shareholder pressure. There is reason to believe that Focke's removal was to allow Focke-Wulf's manufacturing capacity to be used to produce Bf 109 aircraft. The company was taken over by AEG, but soon after this the Air Ministry, which had been impressed by the Focke-Wulf Fw 61 helicopter, suggested that Focke establish a new company dedicated to helicopter development, and issued him with a requirement for an improved design, capable of carrying a 700 kg (1,500 lb) payload.

Focke established the Focke-Achgelis company at Hoykenkamp, Germany, on 27 April 1937, in partnership with pilot Gerd Achgelis, and began development work at Delmenhorst later that year.

== Designs ==
- Focke-Achgelis Fa 223 Drache (Dragon), transport helicopter (20 produced)
- Focke-Achgelis Fa 225 rotary wing glider (prototype), 1942
- Focke-Achgelis Fa 266 Hornisse (Hornet), helicopter (prototype)
- Focke-Achgelis Fa 269, VTOL aircraft (project only)
- Focke-Achgelis Fa 284, large transport helicopter (project only)
- Focke-Achgelis Fa 325 Krabbe (crab), heavy transport multicopter (project only)
- Focke-Achgelis Fa 330 Bachstelze (Wagtail), rotor kite, 1942
- Focke-Achgelis Fa 336 scout helicopter (prototype), 1944

== See also ==
- List of RLM aircraft designations

== Bibliography ==
- Coates, Steve; with Carbonel, Jean-Christophe (2002). Helicopters of the Third Reich. Hersham, UK: Classic Publications. ISBN 1-903223-24-5.
