= Niess 1-80 =

Brazilian trainer aircraft

General information
- Type: Trainer aircraft
- Manufacturer: Fábrica do Galeão
- Designer: Marc Niess
- Number built: 70

History
- Introduction date: 1952
- First flight: 1950
- Developed into: Niess 2-100

The Niess 1-80, also known as Galeão 5 FG, was a military and civilian trainer aircraft built in Brazil during the 1950s. It was originally developed by Marc Niess as a prototype based on the CAP-4 Paulistinha, which he worked while employed at Companhia Aeronáutica Paulista.

== Development ==
In early 1952, the Brazilian Air Force decided to use Fábrica do Galeão to build a light trainer for the Brazilian air clubs, and chose the 1-80(in Portuguese: Um-Oitenta) prototype airplane by designer Marc Niess. The tests for aeronautical certification began at Campo de Marte, where the plane was approved soon after. The engineers decided to make some modifications to the original design of the plane, structural changes in the wings that become made of plywood, and the fuel capacity was increased.

After the modifications, the now called Galeão 5 FG, were more robust and had greater range, although they were inferior in aerobatic practices. It proved to be a very difficult aircraft to control, and was not recommended for basic pilot instruction. Even so, a couple of units were donated to Brazilian flying clubs, and a few others went to Paraguay and Uruguay.

== Operators ==
Brazil

- Brazilian Navy

== Specifications (Galeão 5 FG) ==
Data from Enciclopédia de Aviões Brasileiros

General characteristics

- Crew: Two, pilot and instructor
- Length: 6.45 m (21 ft 2 in)
- Wingspan: 9.60 m (31 ft 6 in)
- Height: 2 m (6 ft 7 in)
- Wing area: 14.5 m^{2} (156 sq ft)
- Empty weight: 358 kg (789 lb)
- Gross weight: 622 kg (1,371 lb)
- Fuel capacity: 80 L (21 US gal; 18 imp gal)
- Powerplant: 1 × Continental C85-8 , 63 kW (85 hp)
- Propellers: 2-bladed

Performance

- Maximum speed: 180 km/h (110 mph, 97 kn)
- Cruise speed: 150 km/h (93 mph, 81 kn)
- Range: 500 km (310 mi, 270 nmi)
