= Gerd Achgelis =

German aviator (1908 – 1991)

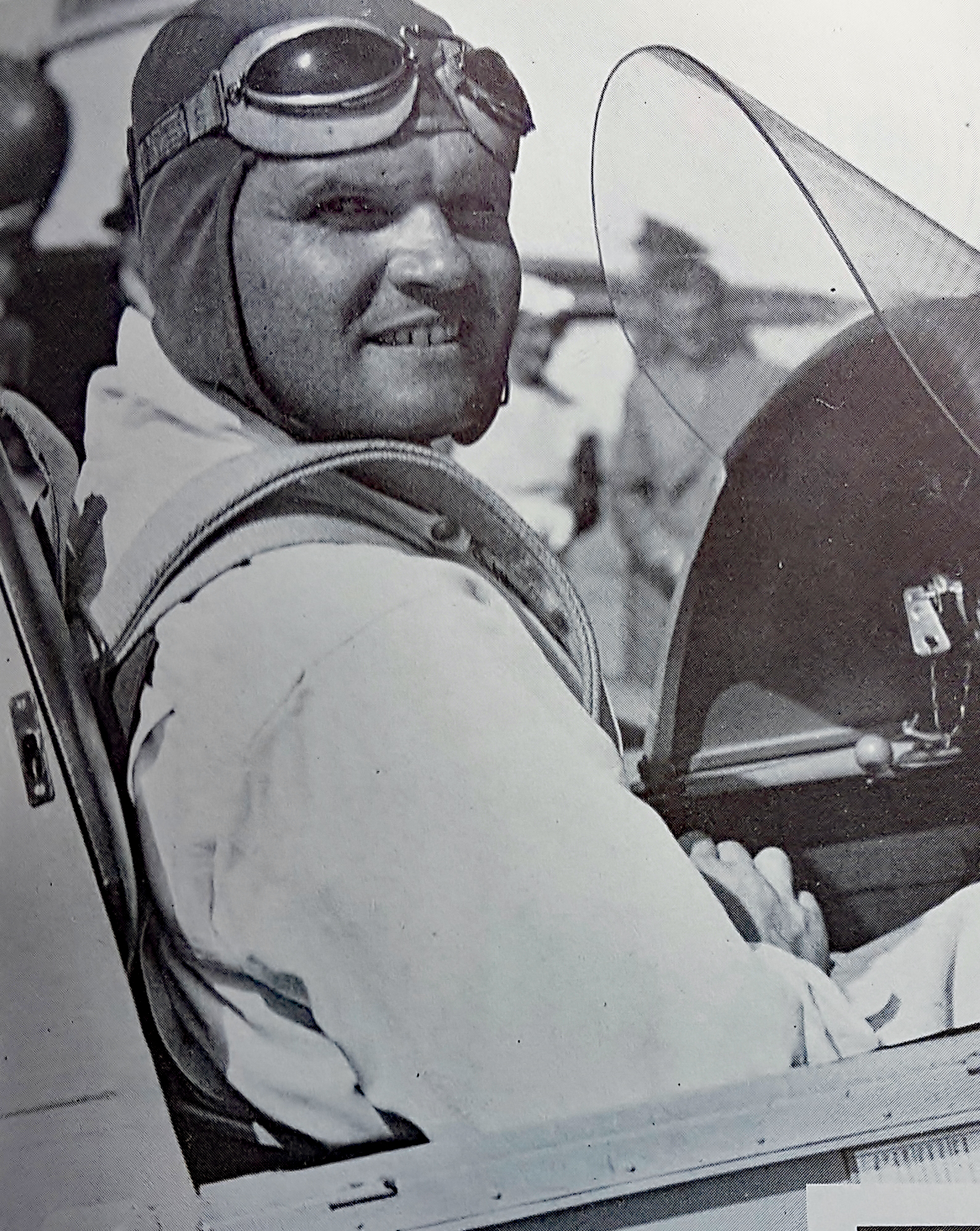
- Born: 16 July 1908; Golzwarden, Grand Duchy of Oldenburg
- Died: 18 May 1991 (aged 82); Hude, Lower Saxony
- Occupations: Stunt pilot, test pilot
- Awards: Légion d'honneur (1975)

Gerd Achgelis (16 July 1908 – 18 May 1991) was a German aviator, test pilot, and pioneer in the development of helicopters.

== Biography ==
Achgelis was born in Golzwarden in Oldenburg, and after an apprenticeship as an electrician, began working as a stunt pilot in 1928. In 1930 he flew inverted for an hour over London, and in 1931 he was the German aerobatic champion. Flying a Fw 44 Stieglitz, Achgelis was placed third in the 1934 World Aerobatic Championships in Paris, (fellow German Gerhard Fieseler placing first) and was 5th at the 1936 event in Berlin.

From April 1932, he also worked as a flying instructor at the Technikum Weimar, and in 1933 became chief test pilot for the Focke-Wulf company in Bremen. On 26 June 1936 he flew the Focke-Wulf Fw 61, considered the first practical helicopter, on its maiden flight. On 27 April 1937, together with Henrich Focke, he founded the company Focke-Achgelis to develop and manufacture helicopters at Hoykenkamp.

In 1933 Hermann Göring proposed that Achgelis take a post as an instructor at the Deutsche Verkehrsfliegerschule ("German Air Transport School"), to establish and train an aerobatic team. Achgelis turned down the offer, and he also refused Göring's request to take the position of Generalluftzeugmeister ("Luftwaffe Director-General of Equipment") after the death of Ernst Udet in November 1941. He worked as a test pilot at an aircraft factory in Graudenz until the end of World War II.

After the war, Achgelis retired to his family farm, and from 1952 had commercial interests in Hude. However he remained connected to flying. In 1961, he was one of the founders of the airfield Flugplatz Oldenburg-Hatten at Hatten, and in 1975, he received the légion d'honneur from France for his achievements in aviation. He also donated the Kavalier der Lüfte trophy, which is presented annually every November.

Achgelis died at his home in Hude in 1991.
