= I.P.D BF-1 Beija-Flor =

Two-seat light helicopter

BF-1 Beija-Flôr

General information
- Type: Light helicopter
- National origin: Brazil
- Manufacturer: IPD
- Designer: Henrich Focke
- Number built: 3

History
- First flight: 1 January 1959

The I.P.D BF-1 Beija-Flôr (English: Humming Bird) was a two-seat light helicopter designed by Henrich Focke.

== Design and development ==
The BF-1 was built by the aircraft department of the Brazilian Research and Development Institute Instituto de Pesquisa e Desenvolvimento (IPD) (formerly the CTA - Centro Técnico Aeroespacial), using a design of Henrich Focke. It was a conventional three-bladed single rotor helicopter, powered by a 225 hp (168 kW) Continental E225 piston engine, mounted in the nose. The tail unit included a small vertical dorsal fin with a horizontal stabilizer on the starboard side. Two inter-meshing tail rotors, each inclined at 45°, provided pitch and yaw control.

== Operational history ==
Three prototypes were built, the first flying on 1 January 1959, but the type did not enter production.

== Specifications ==
Data from Illustrated Encyclopedia of Aircraft, Jane's all the World's Aircraft 1959–60

General characteristics

- Crew: 1
- Capacity: 1 passenger
- Length: 8.43 m (27 ft 8 in)
- Height: 3.15 m (10 ft 4 in)
- Empty weight: 700 kg (1,543 lb)
- Gross weight: 950 kg (2,094 lb)
- Powerplant: 1 × Continental E225 6-cyl air-cooled horizontally-opposed piston engine, 168 kW (225 hp)
- Main rotor diameter: 9 m (29 ft 6 in)
- Main rotor area: 63.625 m^{2} (684.85 sq ft) with 2 inter-meshing tail rotors each inclined at 45°

Performance

- Maximum speed: 150 km/h (93 mph, 81 kn) at sea level
- Cruise speed: 130 km/h (81 mph, 70 kn) for maximum range; 140 km/h (87 mph; 76 kn)
- Range: 270 km (170 mi, 150 nmi) at 130 km/h (81 mph; 70 kn)
- Endurance: 3 hours maximum
- Service ceiling: 3,750 m (12,300 ft) maximum
- Service ceiling: 3,500 m (11,500 ft)
- Hover ceiling in ground effect: 2,700 m (8,900 ft)
- Hover ceiling out of ground effect: 1,400 m (4,600 ft)
- Rate of climb: 6.2 m/s (1,220 ft/min)

== See also ==
Aircraft of comparable role, configuration, and era

- Cessna CH-1
- Baumgärtl PB-64

Related lists

- List of rotorcraft
