= Focke-Achgelis Fa 223 Drache =

1940 helicopter series by Focke-Achgelis

Fa 223 Drache
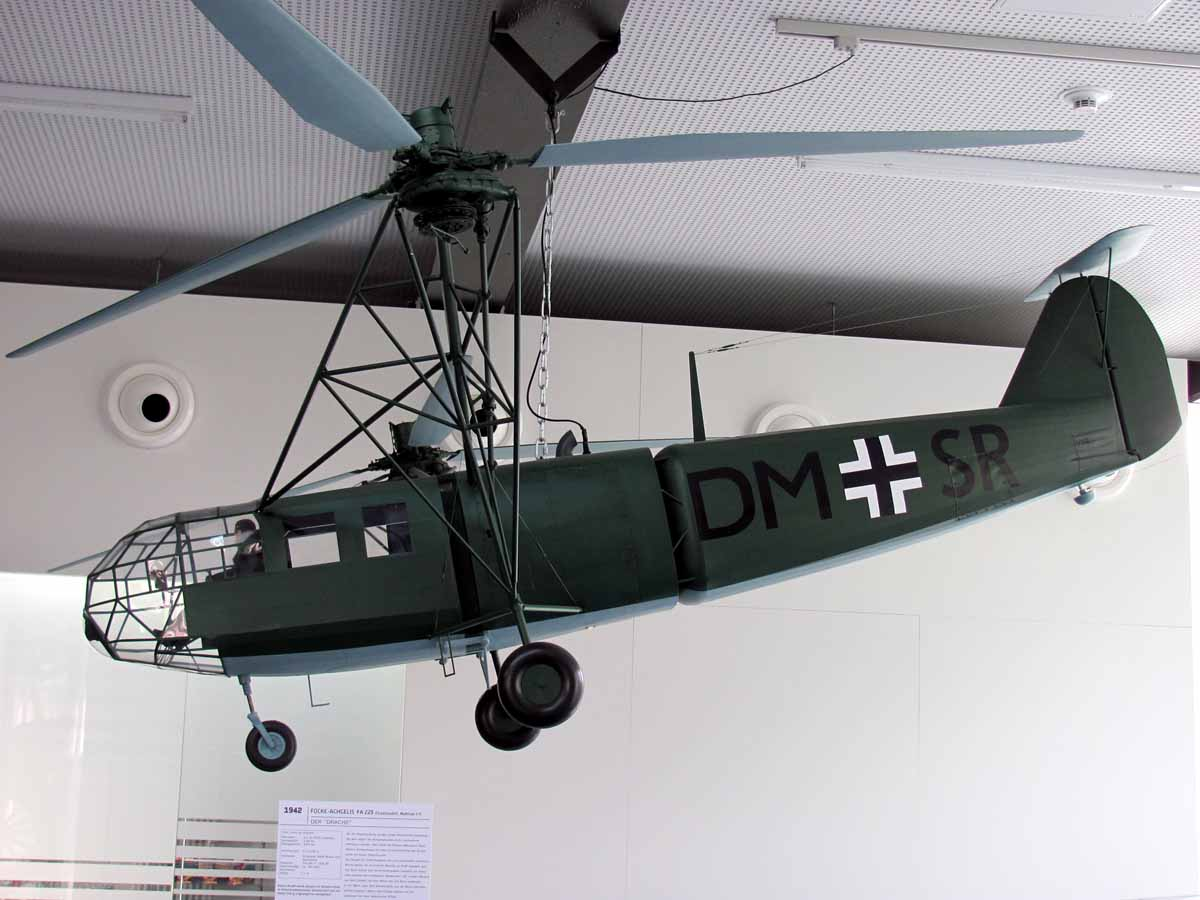
- A model of a Fa 223 at the Hubschraubermuseum Bückeburg (Bückeburg Helicopter Museum)

General information
- Type: Helicopter
- Manufacturer: Focke-Achgelis
- Primary users: Luftwaffe Czechoslovak Air Force; French Air Force
- Number built: 20

History
- Introduction date: 1941
- First flight: 3 August 1940

The Focke-Achgelis Fa 223 Drache (English: Dragon) was a helicopter developed by Germany during World War II. A single 750-kilowatt (1,010 hp) Bramo 323 radial engine powered two three-bladed 11.9-metre (39 ft) rotors mounted on twin booms on either side of the 12.2-metre-long (40 ft) cylindrical fuselage. Although the Fa 223 is noted for being the first helicopter to attain production status, production of the helicopter was hampered by Allied bombing of the factory, and only 20 were built.

The Fa 223 could cruise at 175 kilometres per hour (109 mph) with a top speed of 182 km/h (113 mph), and climb to an altitude of 7,100 m (23,300 ft). The Drache could transport cargo loads of over 1,000 kg (2,200 lb) at cruising speeds of 121 km/h (75 mph) and altitudes approaching 2,440 m (8,010 ft).

== Design and development ==
Henrich Focke had been removed by the Nazi regime from the company he had co-founded in 1936. Though the ostensible reason was that he was "politically unreliable", the RLM decision to phase Focke-Wulf into the production program of the almost-ready Messerschmitt Bf 109 necessitated an influx of capital to fund the immediate expansion of the company's production capabilities. Focke-Wulf was reorganized into a limited company (G.m.b.H.) in June 1936.

After Focke-Wulf formally signed a contract to produce the Bf 109C in November 1937, the American company International Telephone & Telegraph (ITT), through its German subsidiary C. Lorenz, bought a 28 percent share of Focke-Wulf in 1938, making it the controlling interest.

However, the Air Ministry was so impressed by the Focke-Wulf Fw 61 helicopter that it suggested Focke establish a new company dedicated to helicopter development and issued him with a requirement for an improved design capable of carrying a 700 kg (1,500 lb) payload. Focke established the Focke-Achgelis company at Hoykenkamp on 27 April 1937 in partnership with pilot Gerd Achgelis, and began development work at Delmenhorst in 1938.

They first produced an enlarged, six-occupant version of the Fw 61, designated Fa 226 Hornisse (Hornet), while contracting out development of the engine, transmission, and rotor hub to BMW's Berlin works. The Fa 226 was the world's first transport helicopter and was ordered by Lufthansa in 1938.

The Fa 226 attracted the attention of the Air Ministry, who redesignated it Fa 223 in 1939 before the first prototype flew. The Navy was also interested in the Hornisse and briefly considered it as a replacement for their Schnellboote.

In September 1939 the first prototype, the V1, left the Delmenhorst factory. Now nicknamed Drache ("Dragon") it had a twin-rotor layout similar to the Fw 61, but had a fully enclosed cabin and load bay, with the single Bramo engine mounted in the middle of the tubular-steel body.

Initial hovering tests showed problems and the V1 was not to fly until 1940. The engine initially specified, a BMW Bramo 323D proved too fragile when run at high speed for any length of time, and was replaced with a more robust 1,000 hp Bramo 323Q3 in the later prototypes to improve reliability and lifting capability. The biggest problem, however, was the severe vibration caused by unbalanced driveshafts when the rotors moved out of phase, and this could only be fixed by greater attention to detail on the part of BMW.

=== First flight ===
The V1's first untethered flight was on 3 August 1940, after over 100 hours of ground and tethered testing. In October, it was flown to the test centre at Rechlin to be demonstrated, and while there set a top speed of 182 km/h (113 mph), a climb rate of 528 m (1,732 ft) per minute, and a maximum altitude of 7,100 m (23,300 ft), performance far greater than had been demonstrated by any other helicopter in the world.

Despite this, the Drache was nowhere near ready for military service, and Focke-Achgelis were told to accelerate their development programme. An initial production order for 100 machines was promised. Following the helicopter's demonstration at Rechlin, the Ministry issued specifications for five variants:

On 5 February 1941, the V1 was lost in an accident following engine failure at an altitude too low for an auto-rotative landing. The second prototype (V2) was completed shortly after, featuring a fully glazed cockpit and a machine gun operated by the observer. It was, however, soon destroyed in an Allied air raid.

=== V3 prototype ===
By the time the V3 prototype appeared the Air Ministry had abandoned the idea of different variants and settled on a single multipurpose aircraft, to be designated Fa 223E, which could combine all the roles; the V3 reflected this new thinking and set the design features for all the models that followed and it incorporated dual controls and an electric winch.

Like its predecessors, the V3's body consisted of welded steel tubing covered with treated fabric to save weight and make repairs easier. Its interior was divided into four sections: the cockpit, where pilot and observer sat side by side, with the pilot on the left; the load compartment; the engine compartment; and the tail section. The engine and gearbox were centrally mounted and held in place by a series of tensioned steel cables, with the gearbox in front of the engine. Two steel tube outriggers extended out from the sides of the fuselage to carry the twin rotors, of three-bladed configuration and wooden construction with a steel spar, which were mounted 12.5 m (41 ft 0 in) apart, far enough that they did not overlap.

In 1943, an enlarged, four-rotored version of the Fa 223 was considered, but not developed beyond the construction of a centre fuselage section.

== Operational history ==
=== Production ===
Serial production of the Fa 223 began at the Focke-Achgelis factory in Delmenhorst in 1942. The site was struck in June that year by an Allied air raid and destroyed along with the two surviving prototypes and the first seven pre-production machines undergoing final assembly.

Attempts were made to restore production but were abandoned in 1943, and a new plant was set up at Laupheim, near Ulm. The first Drache to emerge from the new factory, the V11, was flown by pilot Karl Bode for a series of information films made for the Air Ministry to demonstrate the Fa 223's abilities. Loads which included a complete Fieseler Storch aircraft and the fuselage of a Bf 109 were shown being lowered with great precision on to vehicles using the Drache's winch and special quick-release electrical cargo hook.

In early 1944, a Dornier Do 217 crashed high up on the Vehner moor in Lower Saxony, between Osnabrück and Oldenburg, and it was decided to send the V11 to recover the wreckage. However, the V11 ended up crashing nearby before it could attempt to lift the Do 217's remains. It was then decided to attempt to recover both using the V14. Flown by Bode and Luftwaffe helicopter pilot Helmut Gerstenhauer, the operation was begun on 11 May 1944. A small team of Focke-Achgelis men and a Luftwaffe recovery company had already dismantled the V11, and the V14 made 10 flights carrying loads beneath it in a cargo net and setting them down where they could be loaded onto road vehicles. All the major parts of the V11 and the Do 217 were retrieved, and much useful experience was gained.

Following this, the Air Ministry decided to evaluate the helicopter's potential as a transport in mountainous regions, and the V16 was assigned to the Mountain Warfare School at Mittenwald, near Innsbruck, with the V14 as a backup. The objective of the tests was to see how the Drache would perform as a general-purpose all-weather transport, and numerous landings were made at altitudes of over 1,600 m (5,200 ft) above sea level, plus experimental transportation of artillery guns to mountain troops. When the trials ended in October 1944, a total of 83 flights had been made, with a total flying time of 20 hours.

Only seven machines had been constructed at Laupheim before an air raid halted production in July 1944, and wiped out the factory. At the time of the raid, the V18 prototype was ready for delivery, 13 Drachen were in assembly, and there were enough components for a further 19. Following the raid the Air Ministry decided that it was useless to pursue the project any further and following the mountain trials Focke was assigned to Messerschmitt's staff.

Only weeks later, Focke received new orders, this time to return to the Focke-Achgelis company and to move the entire operation to Berlin Tempelhof Airport where flight testing was to be resumed, and a production line established to produce 400 helicopters per month.

The V12, after completing a long cross-country flight from Germany, was flown to Mont Blanc to perform a rescue of 17 people trapped on the mountain. A mechanical link failure resulted in a rotor disintegrating, and, although the machine touched down on its wheels, it was hurled against an embankment and the crew was killed.

=== Danzig flight ===
The company had managed to keep hold of two of the five surviving Drachen and managed to produce a new example at Tempelhof in February 1945. Almost immediately it was ordered on a "special order from the Führer" to fly to Danzig on 25 February. Flown by Gerstenhauer and two copilots, the Drache took off from Tempelhof the next day. It first headed southwest in the direction of Würzburg. Gerstenhauer lost his bearings in the bad weather and had to land at Crailsheim. Once the weather improved, they set off again and landed at Würzburg to refuel, reaching Meiningen, where it stopped overnight. The next day it set off northeast and flew to Werder, a distance of 315 km (196 mi). On the third day the Drache continued towards Stettin-Altdamm, but the bad weather again forced them to land, this time at Prenzlau. They attempted to resume the flight the next day, but the weather remained bad and they had to stop at Stolp, west of Danzig, for the night.

By 5 March the war situation had become very bad, and Gerstenhauer decided they had to leave Stolp before the Soviets arrived. They took off and flew directly to Danzig right over the advancing Soviet army, reaching Danzig only to find that the city was already falling. They landed outside the city to wait for further orders, which when they came directed them to return to Werder. They did this via a lengthy flight along the Baltic coast via Garz, not reaching Werder until 11 March. The twelve days of actual flight had seen Gerstenhaur and his crew cover a distance of 1,675 km (1,041 mi) with a flight time of 16 hours 25 minutes.

=== TS/40 ===
In January 1945, the Air Ministry assigned the other three Drachen to Transportstaffel 40 (TS/40) at Mühldorf, Bavaria, the Luftwaffe's only operational helicopter squadron, equipped with at least five Flettner Fl 282s as well as the Drachen. TS/40 relocated to various sites before ending up at Ainring in Germany, where one of the Drachen was destroyed by its pilot to prevent it being captured and the other two were seized by US forces.

=== Cross-Channel flight ===
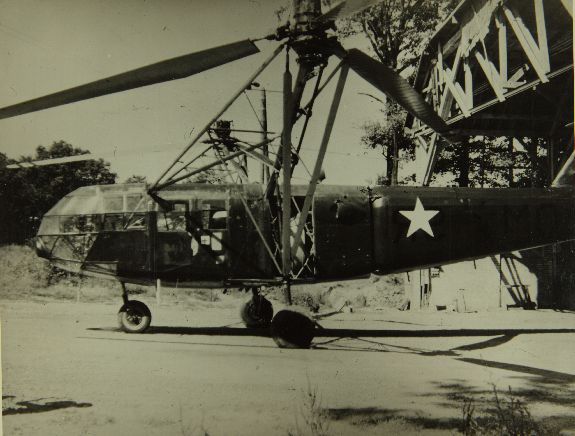
Captured Fa 223

The US intended to ferry captured aircraft back to the US aboard a ship, but only had room for one of the captured Drachen. The RAF objected to plans to destroy the other, the V14, so Gerstenhauer, with two observers, flew it across the English Channel from Cherbourg to RAF Beaulieu on 6 September 1945, the first crossing of the Channel by a helicopter. The V14 later made two test flights at RAF Beaulieu before being destroyed on 3 October in a crash where the helicopter dropped 18 metres to the ground. Every 25 hours, the steel housing securing the engine should have been tightened using a special tool, but that tool was never brought to England. Despite Gerstenhauer's warnings, the tests had continued to be made, leading to the driveshaft failure and the crash.

=== Postwar production ===
In France, the Sud-Est company constructed the SE.3000 as a development of the Fa 223, assisted by Focke. Designed for transport purposes, it had accommodation for four passengers and was powered by a 720 hp (540 kW) Bramo "Fafnir" engine. Three were built, the first flown on 23 October 1948.

Two Fa 223s were completed by the Československé Závody Letecké (formerly Avia) factory in Czechoslovakia in 1945–1946 from salvaged components, and designated VR-1. The first flight occurred on 12 March 1948.

== Variants ==
Fa 223A
for anti-submarine warfare, to carry 2 × 250 kg (550 lb) bombs or depth charges
Fa 223B
for reconnaissance missions; fitted with an auxiliary drop tank
Fa 223C
for search and rescue duties, fitted with a steel winch cable
Fa 223D
freight variant, for resupplying mountain troops
Fa 223E
dual-control trainer
Fa 223Z
A hybrid Fa 223 was proposed by Focke with two bodies joined inline to form a four-rotor heavy lift helicopter. An unfinished central joining section was found by Allied troops at Ochsenhausen.
Fa 266 Hornisse
proposed passenger version
SE.3000
postwar French production
VR-1
postwar Czechoslovak production

== Operators ==
World War II
Germany

- Luftwaffe
  - Transportstaffel 40

Post-war
Czechoslovakia

- Czechoslovak Air Force received 2 built post war, designated VR-1.

France

- French Air Force received 1 built post war, designated SE-3000.

== Specifications (Fa 223E) ==
Data from Air International and Defense Media Network

General characteristics

- Crew: 2
- Capacity: 4 passengers
- Length: 12.25 m (40 ft 2 in) fuselage length
- Wingspan: 24.50 m (80 ft 5 in) span over rotors
- Height: 4.36 m (14 ft 4 in)
- Empty weight: 3,180 kg (7,011 lb)
- Gross weight: 3,860 kg (8,510 lb)
- Max takeoff weight: 4,315 kg (9,513 lb)
- Fuel capacity: 490 L (108 Imp gal) internal + 300 L (66 Imp gal) external tank
- Powerplant: 1 × BMW Bramo 323D-2 nine-cylinder radial, 750 kW (1,000 hp) at take-off
- Main rotor diameter: 2 × 12.00 m (39 ft 4 in)
- Main rotor area: 226.00 m^{2} (2,432.6 sq ft)

Performance

- Maximum speed: 176 km/h (109 mph, 95 kn) at 2,000 m (6,600 ft)
- Cruise speed: 134 km/h (83 mph, 72 kn) at 2,000 m (6,600 ft)
- Range: 437 km (272 mi, 236 nmi) internal fuel
- Ferry range: 700 km (430 mi, 380 nmi) with auxiliary fuel
- Endurance: 2 hr 20 min
- Service ceiling: 4,875 m (16,000 ft) service ceiling
- Rate of climb: 4.1 m/s (800 ft/min) (vertical rate of climb), 5.6 m/s (1,100 ft/min) with forward speed

Armament

- Guns: 1 × MG 15 machine gun manually aimed from the nose.
- Bombs: 2× 250 kg (550 lb) bombs or 2x depth charges

== See also ==
Related development

- Focke-Wulf Fw 61

Aircraft of comparable role, configuration, and era

- Bratukhin Omega
- Flettner Fl 282
- Platt-LePage XR-1
- Sikorsky R-4

Related lists

- List of rotorcraft used in World War II
- Transverse rotors

== Bibliography ==
- Coates, Steve and Carbonel, Jean-Christophe. Helicopters of the Third Reich. Crowborough, UK: Classic Publications Ltd., 2002. ISBN 1-903223-24-5.
- "Fa 223...Henrich Focke's Singular Kite", Part One. Air International, May 1984, Vol. 26 No. 5. Bromley, UK:Pilot Press. pp. 245–247, 259–262. ISSN 0306-5634.
- "Fa 223...Henrich Focke's Singular Kite", Part Two. Air International, June 1984, Vol. 26 No. 6. Bromley, UK:Pilot Press. pp. 291–296. ISSN 0306-5634.
- Kay, Antony L.; J. Richard Smith (2002). German Aircraft of the Second World War: Including Helicopters and Missiles. Annapolis, MD: Naval Institute Press. ISBN 978-1557500106.
- Munson, Kenneth (1978). German Aircraft Of World War 2 in colour. Poole, Dorsett, UK: Blandford Press. ISBN 0-7137-0860-3.
- Nowarra, Heinz J. German Helicopters, 1928-1945. Atglen, Pennsylvania: Schiffer Publishing, 1990. ISBN 0-88740-289-5.
- Polmar, Norman; Kennedy, Floyd D. (1981). Military Helicopters of the World: Military Rotary-wing Aircraft Since 1917. Naval Institute Press. ISBN 0-87021-383-0..
- Sampson, Anthony (1973). The Sovereign State of ITT. Stein and Day. ISBN 0-8128-1537-8.
- Smith, J. Richard. Focke-Wulf, an Aircraft Album. London: Ian Allan, 1973. ISBN 0-7110-0425-0.
- Smith, J. Richard and Kay, Anthony. German Aircraft of the Second World War. London: Putnam & Company 1972 (3rd edition 1978). ISBN 0-370-00024-2.
- Witkowski, Ryszard. Rotorcraft of the Third Reich. Redbourn, UK: Mushroom Model Publications, 2007. ISBN 978-83-89450-43-2.
