= IABSA Aerobatic 65-02 =

Premier 65-02

General information
- Type: Utility aircraft
- National origin: Brazil
- Manufacturer: Indústria Aeronáutica Brasileira
- Designer: Vicente Martin Llopis
- Number built: 1

History
- First flight: 1965

The IABSA Aerobatic 65-02 was a Brazilian single-engine, multirole aircraft and touring braced high-wing designed and built by Indústria Aeronáutica Brasileira (IABSA), powered by a 75 hp (56 kW) piston engine. Although well rated, it never went into production.

== Specifications ==
Data from Taylor 1965, p. 12

General characteristics

- Crew: 2
- Length: 4.67 m (15 ft 4 in)
- Wingspan: 5.30 m (17 ft 5 in)
- Powerplant: 1 × Continental A65 air-cooled four-cylinder horizontally-opposed, 56 kW (75 hp)
- Propellers: 2 fixed-pitch metal propeller-bladed

Performance

- Range: 600 km (370 mi, 320 nmi)
- Service ceiling: 4,000 m (13,000 ft)
