= Niess 2-100 =

General information
- Type: Sports aircraft
- Designer: Marc Niess
- Number built: 2

History
- Introduction date: 1952
- First flight: 1952

The Niess 2-100, was a civilian two-seat high-wing sport aircraft built in Brazil during 1952.

== Design and development ==
It was developed and manufactured by Marc Niess, a Brazilian aeronautical engineer, while the certification tests for the Niess 1-80 were still underway. With a similar fuselage to its predecessor, it was distinguished by its tricycle landing gear and its negative-glare wings with forward-facing tips, which gave it advantages over stall. After some tests at the Parque Aeronáutico de São Paulo, some stability problems were noted, which were solved by increasing the rudder's vertical surface.

== Operational history ==
The first prototype was sent to the Department of Aerospace Science and Technology in São José dos Campos, where it underwent further tests with pilots from the Brazilian Air Force, where it was approved. The National Civil Aviation Agency of Brazil bought two airplanes, including the prototype. The first (PT-GLI) was deactivated after flying for five years.

Some years later, the second (PP-ZPE) was returned to Marc Niess, who took it to São Paulo, where it was stored until it was destroyed in an accident that occurred in the building it was in.

== Specifications ==
Data from Construção Aeronáutica no Brasil 1910-1976

General characteristics

- Crew: Two, pilot and instructor
- Length: 6.54 m (21 ft 5 in)
- Wingspan: 9.64 m (31 ft 8 in)
- Height: 2 m (6 ft 7 in)
- Empty weight: 380 kg (838 lb)
- Gross weight: 672 kg (1,482 lb)
- Fuel capacity: 100 L (26 US gal; 22 imp gal)
- Powerplant: 1 × Lycoming O-235 air-cooled, 75 kW (100 hp)
- Propellers: 2-bladed

Performance

- Maximum speed: 185 km/h (115 mph, 100 kn)
- Cruise speed: 170 km/h (110 mph, 92 kn)
