= Henrich Focke =

German aviation pioneer

Henrich Focke (8 October 1890 – 25 February 1979) was a German aviation pioneer from Bremen and also a co-founder of the Focke-Wulf company. He is best known as the inventor of the Fw 61, the first successful, practical, and fully controllable helicopter, first flown in 1936. He has been called "father of the helicopter".

== Biography ==
=== Early life ===
Henrich Focke was born in Bremen on 8 October 1890, Focke studied at Leibniz University Hannover, where he became friends with Georg Wulf in 1911. In 1914, he and Wulf both reported for military service and Focke was deferred due to heart problems, but was eventually drafted into an infantry regiment. After serving on the Eastern front, he was transferred to the Imperial German Army Air Service.

Focke graduated in 1920 as Dipl-Ing with distinction. His first job was with the Francke Company of Bremen as a designer of water-gas systems.

=== Focke-Wulf and Focke-Achgelis ===
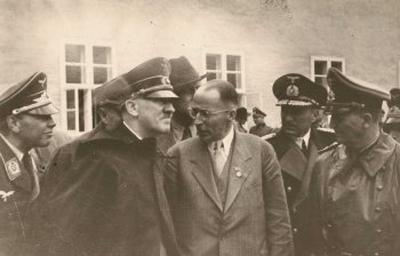
Henrich Focke with Adolf Hitler

In 1923, with Wulf and Dr. Werner Naumann, Focke co-founded Focke-Wulf-Flugzeugbau GmbH. In 1927 Wulf died while test flying the Focke-Wulf F 19 canard monoplane.

In 1930 Focke was offered a chair at the Danzig Institute of Technology, an honour which he declined. In 1931 the city of Bremen awarded him the title of Professor. The same year, Focke-Wulf was merged with the Albatros Flugzeugwerke company.

Focke-Wulf constructed Juan de la Cierva's C.19 and C.30 autogyros under license from 1933, and Focke was inspired by it to design the world's first practical helicopter, the Focke-Wulf Fw 61, which first flew on 26 June 1936 by Ewald Rohlfs. In 1938, Hanna Reitsch piloted the Fw 61 inside the Deutschlandhalle.

In 1936 Focke was ousted from the Focke-Wulf company by shareholder pressure. Though the ostensible reason was that he was considered "politically unreliable" by the Nazi regime, there is reason to believe it was so that Focke-Wulf's manufacturing capacity could be used to produce Bf 109 aircraft. The company was taken over by AEG, but soon after this the Air Ministry, which had been impressed by the Fw 61 helicopter, suggested that Focke establish a new company dedicated to helicopter development and issued him with a requirement for an improved design capable of carrying a 700 kg (1,500 lb) payload.

Focke established the Focke-Achgelis company on 27 April 1937 in partnership with pilot Gerd Achgelis, and began development work at Delmenhorst in 1938. The new company built the experimental Fa 225 using the fuselage of a DFS 230 glider and a rotor from a Fa 223. Another project was the Fa 330 kite with rotor, capable of being deployed by a submarine at a moments notice and then used as a towed spotter. It was stored in a watertight container on the deck of the U-boat and was used during the war. A powered version of the kite would have been the Fa 336 which was in the design phase when the war ended and built in France postwar for testing.

Focke subsequently manufactured the heavy-lift transport helicopter Fa 223, and designed the Fa 224, Fa 266, Fa 269, Fa 283, Fa 284, and the Fa 336 during World War II. Only a few of the large Fa 223 Drache ("Dragon") helicopters actually were produced, but even the prototype set a new helicopter speed record of 182 kilometres per hour (113 mph) and climb record of 8.8 metres per second (1,730 ft/min) in 1940. Subsequent war models were primarily used as mountain troop transport, rescue, and crashed aircraft recovery. The helicopter had provision for a nose-mounted machine gun, and could carry one or two bombs, but the Drache was never used for combat.

Towards the end of Nazi Germany Focke started design work on the Focke Rochen, also known as Schnellflugzeug.

=== Postwar ===
On 1 September 1945, Focke signed a contract with the French company SNCASE and assisted in development of their SE-3000 passenger helicopter, which was based on the Focke-Achgelis Fa 223 "Drache" and which first flew in 1948.

In 1950, he worked as a designer with the North German Automobile Company (Nordwestdeutscher Fahrzeugbau) of Wilhelmshaven.

In 1952, Focke and other members of his former design team were employed by Brazil's Centro Técnico Aeroespacial (CTA), at the time the air force's technical center, to develop a Convertiplane, the "Convertiplano", which drew heavily on Focke's wartime work on the Fa 269. Also recruited was Bussmann, a transmission specialist formerly of BMW. The Convertiplano was built using the fuselage and wings of a Supermarine Spitfire Mk 15, which was believed to be one delivered to Argentina as a sales example. Britain refused to supply the Armstrong Siddeley Double Mamba engine originally selected and the design was altered to accept a mid-mounted 2200 hp Wright engine instead as used in the Lockheed Constellation, which necessitated a redesign of the transmission due to the increase in weight and vibration. Some 40 workers and US$8 million were devoted to the project, and more than 300 takeoffs were achieved.

While working at the CTA Focke also developed the BF-1 Beija-Flor (hummingbird) two-seater light helicopter from 1954, which made its first flight at Sao Jose dos Campos on 22 January 1959. The BF-1 was similar in design to the Cessna CH-1, with a 225 hp Continental E225 engine in the nose and the rotor mast running vertically between the front seats. An open structure tubular steel tail boom carried a pair of tail surfaces and a small tail rotor. The BF-2 was developed from this and first flew on 1 January 1959, and performed an extended flight-testing campaign until it was damaged in an accident. It is thought that further work on the Beija Flor was then abandoned.

Focke returned permanently to Germany in 1956 and began developing a three-seater helicopter named the "Kolibri" ("hummingbird") at the Borgward company in Bremen, with its first flight taking place in 1958. While working at Borgward Focke set up a wind tunnel in a disused hangar in central Bremen; this wind tunnel was rediscovered in 1997 and is today the centerpiece of a museum devoted to him.

After Borgward collapsed in 1961, Focke became a consulting engineer with Vereinigte Flugtechnische Werke of Bremen and Deutsche Forschungsanstalt für Luft-und Raumfahrt. Focke was awarded the Ludwig-Prandtl-Ring from the Deutsche Gesellschaft für Luft- und Raumfahrt (German Society for Aeronautics and Astronautics) for "outstanding contribution in the field of aerospace engineering" in 1961. Focke died in Bremen on 25 February 1979.

In 1993, Focke was inducted into the International Air & Space Hall of Fame at the San Diego Air & Space Museum.

== See also ==
Focke's wind tunnel
