= Fábrica do Galeão =

Airplane manufacturer in the Brazil

Fábrica de Aviões do Galeão
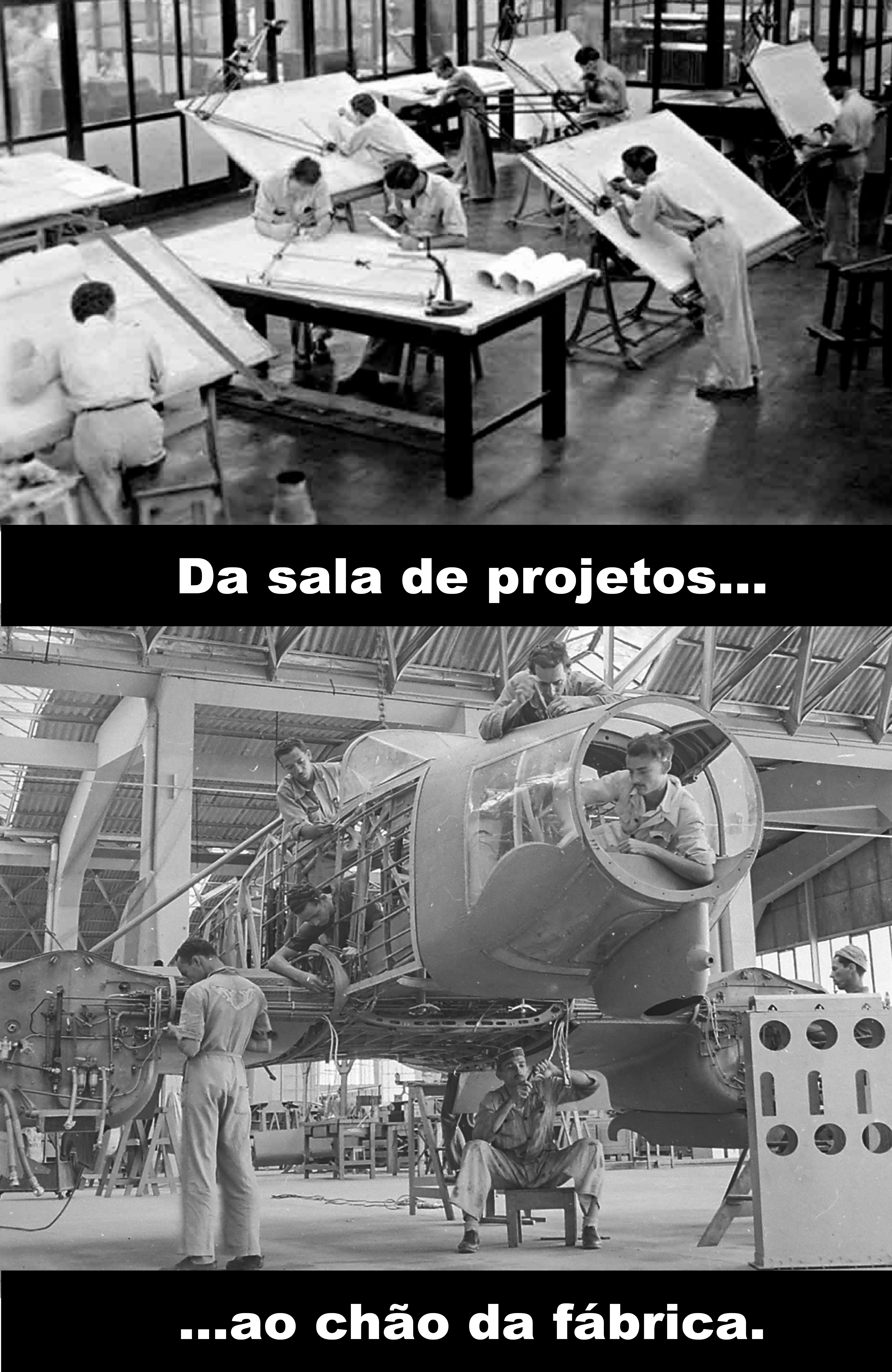
- Type: Join-stock
- Industry: Aerospace
- Founded: 1938; 88 years ago
- Founder: Brazilian Government
- Defunct: 1965; 61 years ago
- Fate: Bankruptcy
- Headquarters: Rio de Janeiro, Brazil
- Products: Aircraft
- Parent: Fokker Indústria Aeronáutica (1950-1959)

Fábrica do Galeão was a Brazilian aircraft manufacturer established in Rio de Janeiro at Galeão Air Force Base.

== History ==
In 1938, the Brazilian Navy set up a workshop at Ilha do Governador to repair and maintain its aircraft. In the same year was signed an agreement for production of aircraft from Focke-Wulf under license. With the outbreak of the World War II, plans to manufacture other German models were halted. In order not to have to stop the activities, an US-American manufacturer was chosen, Fairchild Aircraft.

In 1950, and now under the command of the Brazilian Air Force, the Austrian aeronautical engineer Paul Baumgärtl collaborated on several projects for the Galeão, such as the PB-63 helicopter. At the same time, the factory decided to look for a basic trainer for training new pilots, and the choice fell on the Niess 1-80.

In 1952, Fokker Indústria Aeronáutica S/A was created, a partnership between the federal government and Fokker to manufacture basic trainers for the aeronautics, they used the Galeão facilities until the late 1950s, when it closed for lack of investments.

The company was disbanded in 1962, and the facility was used only to repair and perform aircraft maintenance, until it closed in October 1965.

== Aircraft ==
Summary of aircraft built by Galeão
Model name	First flight	Number built	Type
Galeão 1 FG	1938	40	Two-seat biplane
Galeão 2 FG	1939	26	Monoplane bomber
Galeão 3 FG	1940	220	Military trainer aircraft
Galeão 4 FG	1952	1	Single-seat helicopter
Galeão 5 FG	1952	68	Two-seat trainer aircraft
Galeão 6 FG	1953	100	Two seat trainer aircraft
Galeão 7 FG	1958	15	Two-seat trainer aircraft
Galeão 8 FG	1964	1	Two-seat trainer aircraft
