= Weber W-151 =

General information
- Type: Light aircraft
- Manufacturer: Companhia Nacional de Aviões
- Designer: Willibald Weber
- Number built: 1

History
- Introduction date: 1964
- First flight: 1962

The Weber W-151 was a light aircraft built by the Brazilian manufacturer Campanhia Nacional de Aviões.

== Development ==
Willibald Weber began work on the W-151 in 1962, which flew for the first time in November 1962. The original plan was to build three prototypes. Although the aircraft was superior compared to the Cessna aircraft, series production was not started for cost reasons.

The W-151 was a strutted shoulder-wing aircraft with conventional tailplane and non-retractable nose wheel landing gear. The aircraft was powered by a Continental IO-520C with 210 kW and was made entirely of metal. The enclosed cabin for up to six people could be entered through a door on the left side.

== Specifications ==
Data from Enciclopédia de Aviões Brasileiros

General characteristics

- Crew: One
- Capacity: Four-Five
- Length: 8.40 m (27 ft 7 in)
- Wingspan: 11 m (36 ft 1 in)
- Height: 3.30 m (10 ft 10 in)
- Gross weight: 1,500 kg (3,307 lb)
- Powerplant: 1 × Continental IO-520C boxer engine, 210 kW (280 hp)
- Propellers: 3-bladed

Performance

- Maximum speed: 354 km/h (220 mph, 191 kn)
- Cruise speed: 245 km/h (152 mph, 132 kn)
- Range: 2,100 km (1,300 mi, 1,100 nmi)
