= Hoykenkamp =

- Village of Ganderkesee
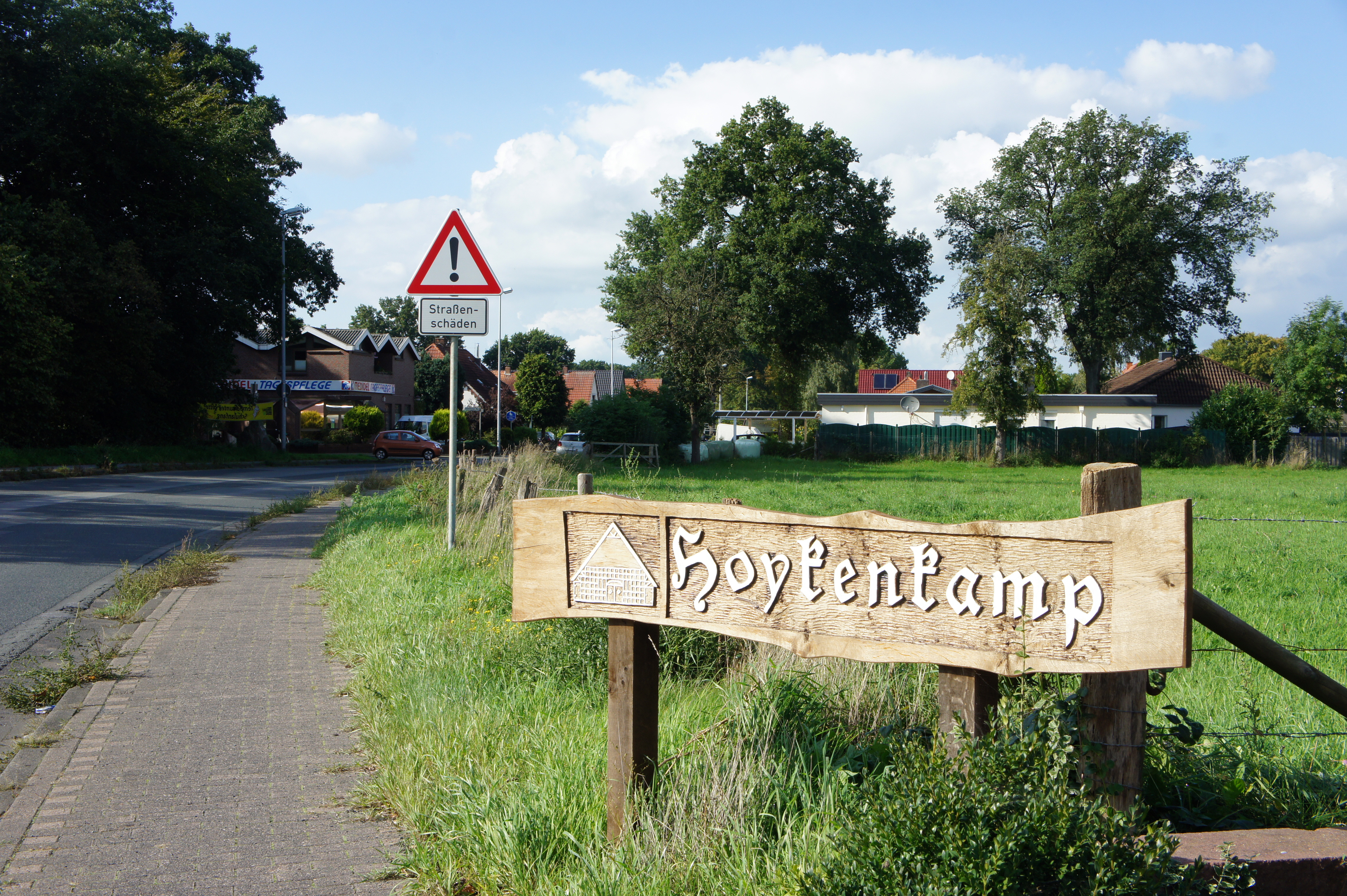
- Interactive map of Hoykenkamp
- Location within Germany Location within Lower Saxony
- Coordinates: 53°04′N 8°36′E
- Country: Germany
- State: Lower Saxony
- District: Oldenburg
- Municipality: Ganderkesee
- Time zone: UTC+01:00 (CET)
  - Summer (DST): UTC+02:00 (CEST)

Hoykenkamp is a small village in Lower Saxony, Germany, north west of Delmenhorst. Hoykenkamp is part of the municipality of Ganderkesee and belongs to the district of Oldenburg.

== History ==
Hoykenkamp's main claim to fame is to be the place where, starting in 1937, German helicopters were constructed and built by Focke Achgelis. During World War II it became a target of allied air raids and during the nights of June 28 and June 29, 1942 was bombed by British bombers. The construction facilities were subsequently re-built. In 1944 the management of Weser Flugzeugbau GmbH transferred from Berlin to Hoykenkamp, taking over offices from Focke Achgelis.

As part of the Focke Achgelis and Weser Flugzeugbau GmbH wartime activities, a number of specialists but also forced laborers were relocated to Hoykenkamp and barracks were placed on the local sports grounds.

To facilitate access to Hoykenkamp from Bremen, Hoykenkamp got its own railway station on the Bremen to Oldenburg and Bremen to Nordenham lines.
