= Focke-Wulf Fw 61 =

First practical, functional helicopter, first flown in 1936

Fw 61
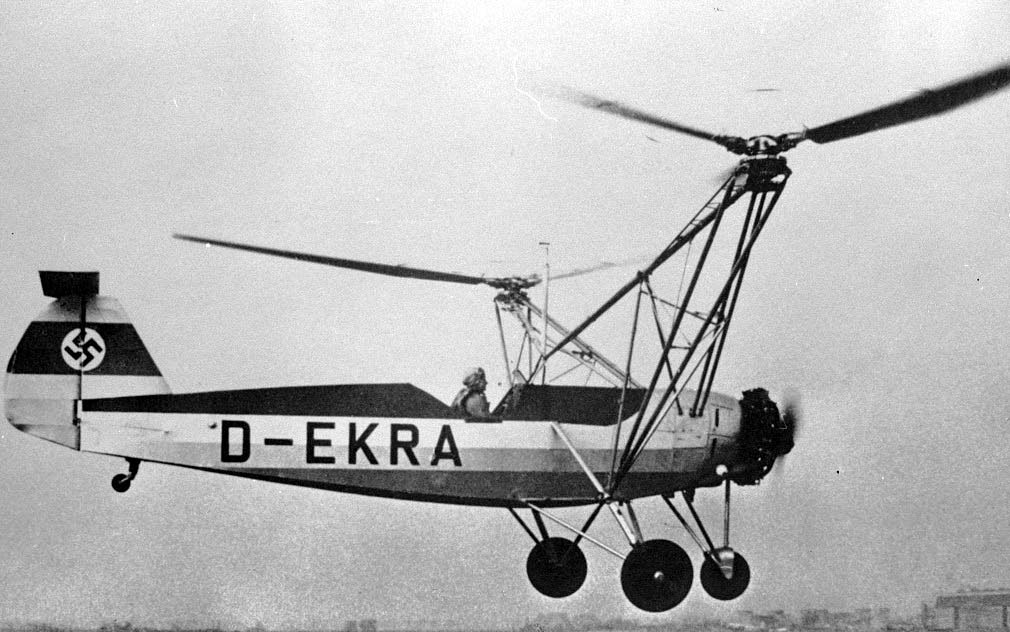
- Fw 61, which Hanna Reitsch flew

General information
- Type: Helicopter
- Manufacturer: Focke-Wulf; Focke-Achgelis
- Primary user: Nazi Germany
- Number built: 2

History
- Introduction date: 1936
- First flight: 26 June 1936

The Focke-Wulf Fw 61 was the first successful, practical, and fully controllable helicopter, first flown in 1936. It was also known as the Fa 61, as Focke began a new company—Focke-Achgelis—in 1937.

== Design and development ==
Professor Henrich Focke, through his development of the Fw 186, and through the efforts of producing the C.19 and C.30 autogyros under licence, came to the conclusion that the limitations of autogyros could be eliminated only by an aircraft with a powered rotor, the helicopter. He and engineer Gerd Achgelis started the design for this helicopter in 1932. A free-flying model, built in 1934 and propelled by a small two-stroke engine, brought the promise of success. Today, the model can be seen in the Deutsches Museum in Munich.

On 9 February 1935, Focke received an order for the building of a prototype, which was designated the Fw 61; Focke referred to it as the F 61. Roluf Lucht of the technical office of the RLM extended the order for a second aircraft on 19 December 1935. The airframe was based on that of a well-tried training aircraft, the Focke-Wulf Fw 44 Stieglitz.

Using rotor technology licensed from the Cierva Autogiro Company, a single radial engine drove twin rotors, set on tubular steel outriggers to the left and right of the fuselage. Each main rotor consisted of three articulated and tapered blades, driven by the engine through gears and shafts. Longitudinal and directional control was achieved using cyclic pitch and asymmetric rotor lift. The counter-rotation of the two rotors solved the problem of torque-reaction as also shown by Louis Bréguet. The small horizontal-axis propeller directly driven by the engine was purely to provide the necessary airflow to cool the engine during low-speed or hovering flight and provided negligible forward thrust.

Only two aircraft were produced. The first prototype, the V 1 D-EBVU, had its first free flight on 26 June 1936 with Ewald Rohlfs at the controls. By early 1937, the second prototype, V 2 D-EKRA, was completed and flown for its first flight. On 10 May 1937, it accomplished its first autorotation landing with the engine turned off.

Focke-Achgelis began work on a two-seat sports version of the Fw 61, the Fa 224, which would have used an Argus As 10C engine and had greater performance. However, the Fa 224 never left the drawing board at the outbreak of World War II.

== Operational history ==
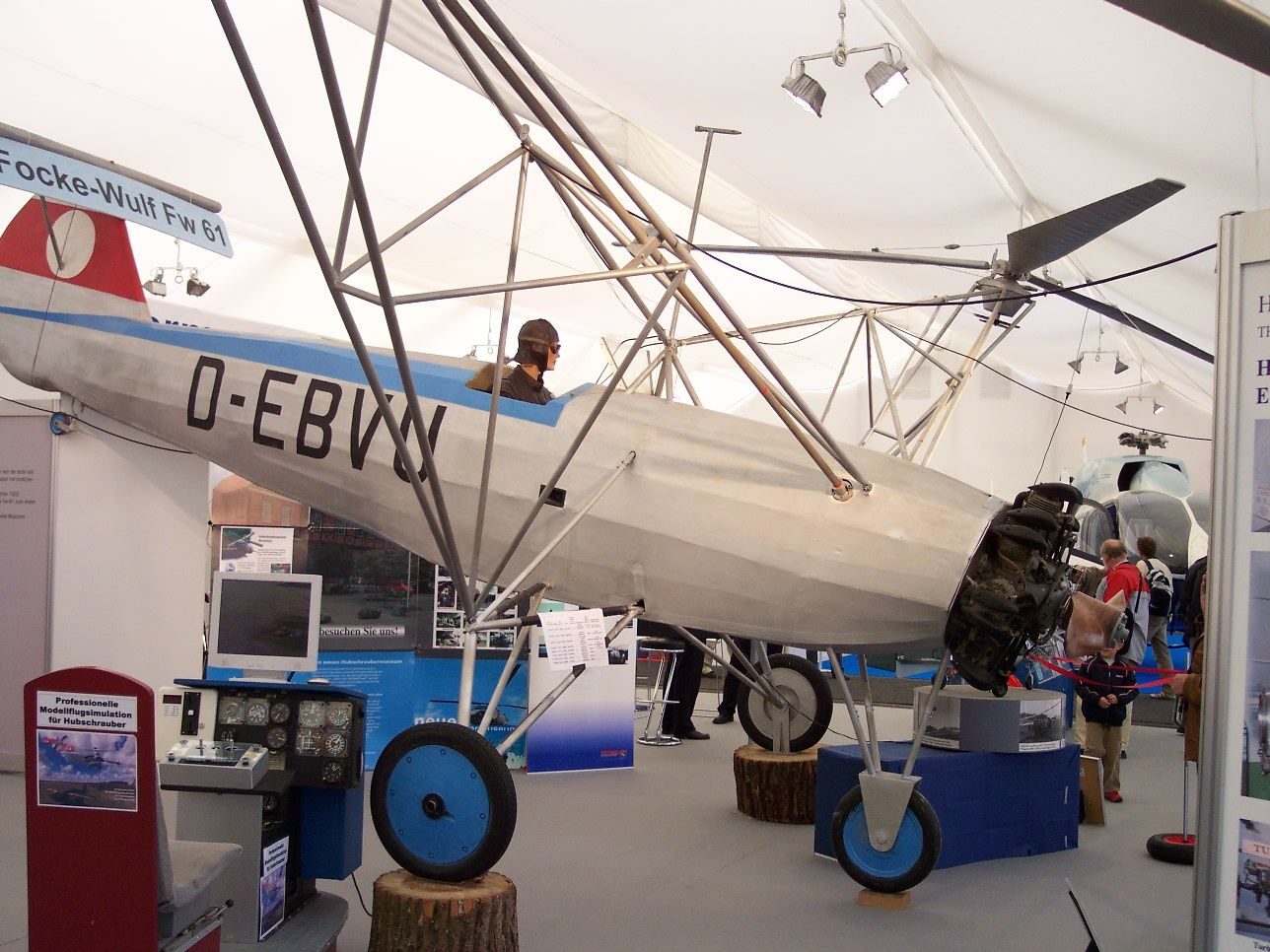
A replica of Fw 61, ILA 2006 at the Hubschraubermuseum in Bückeburg

In February 1938, the Fw 61 was demonstrated by Hanna Reitsch indoors at the Deutschlandhalle sports stadium in Berlin, Germany. It subsequently set several records for altitude, speed and flight duration culminating, in June 1938, with an altitude record of 3,427 m (11,243 ft), breaking the unofficial 605 m (1,985 ft) altitude record of the TsAGI 1-EA single lift-rotor helicopter from the Soviet Union set on 14 August 1932, and a straight-line flight record of 230 km (143 mi).

Neither of these machines appear to have survived World War II, although a replica is on display at the Hubschraubermuseum in Bückeburg, Germany.

== Specifications (Fw 61) ==
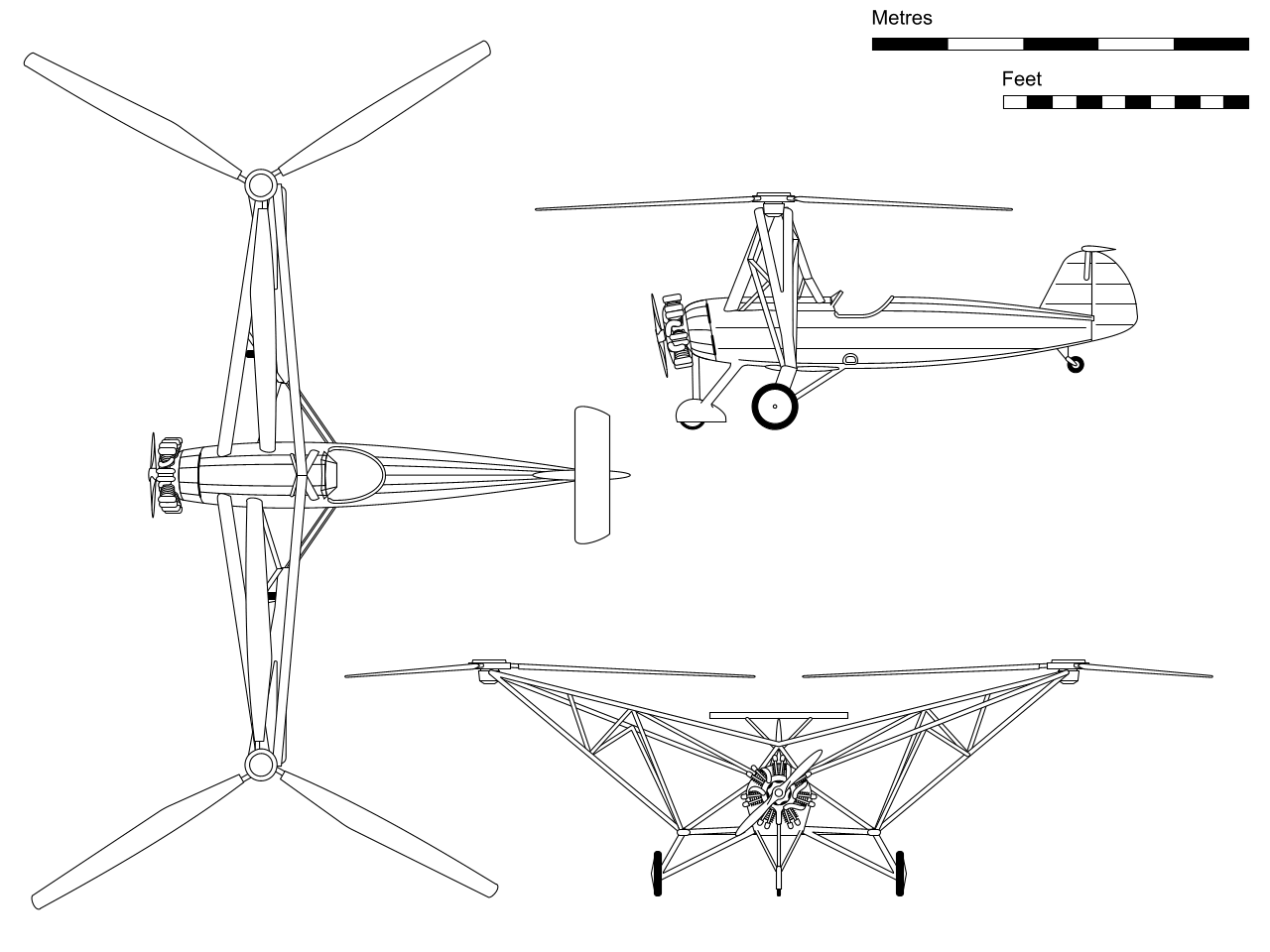
Orthographic projection of the Fw 61 V2

Data from Aircraft of the Third Reich

General characteristics

- Crew: one
- Length: 7.3 m (23 ft 11 in) fuselage only
- Height: 2.65 m (8 ft 8 in)
- Empty weight: 800 kg (1,764 lb)
- Max takeoff weight: 950 kg (2,094 lb)
- Powerplant: 1 × Bramo Sh.14A 7-cyl. air-cooled radial piston engine, 119 kW (160 hp)
- Main rotor diameter: 2 × 7 m (23 ft 0 in)
- Main rotor area: 76.97 m^{2} (828.5 sq ft)

Performance

- Maximum speed: 113 km/h (70 mph, 61 kn) at sea level
- Cruise speed: 90 km/h (56 mph, 49 kn)
- Range: 230 km (140 mi, 120 nmi)
- Service ceiling: 3,427 m (11,243 ft)
- Rate of climb: 3.50 m/s (689 ft/min)

== See also ==
Related development

- Focke-Achgelis Fa 223

Aircraft of comparable role, configuration, and era

- Flettner Fl 265
- Flettner Fl 282
- Gyroplane Laboratoire
- Sikorsky R-4
