= Ewald Rohlfs =

German test pilot (1911–1984)

Ewald Rohlfs (1911 Bremen, Germany – 1984) was a test pilot.

In June 1936 Rohlfs made the first flight of a helicopter, the Focke-Wulf Fw 61. One year later he took the helicopter to an altitude of 1,130 feet (344 m) and then idled the engine, using its spinning rotors to descend safely to the ground.
