= Illustrated Encyclopedia of Aircraft =

1980s British weekly aviation encyclopedia

- The Illustrated Encyclopedia of Aircraft, part 203
- Frequency: Weekly
- Publisher: Orbis Publishing
- Founded: 1981
- Final issue: 1985
- Country: United Kingdom

The Illustrated Encyclopedia of Aircraft was a weekly partwork magazine by Aerospace Publishing (an imprint of Orbis Publishing). It was published in the United Kingdom (and sold in other countries too) during the early 1980s. The magazine was intended to eventually make up a multi-volume encyclopedia dedicated to aviation. First issued in 1981, the partwork consisted of 216 issues, each of twenty pages (plus the covers), making up eighteen volumes (4280 pages). The first two issues were sold together for the price of one, subsequent issues were sold on their own.

Empty binders for each volume (of twelve issues) were also sold. These binders were dark blue in colour and contained the imprint of a Panavia Tornado on the front. They held the issues using a metal strip that was threaded through the staples of each issue to hold them in place. Each issue consisted of four separate sections.

The final two parts (215 and 216), issued in 1985, contained the index for the encyclopedia. A table of contents was also included with these final issues that was intended to be inserted into the start of volume 1.

== History of Aviation ==
The first few pages of each issue (usually four or five) were mostly dedicated to the history of aviation and also covered commercial aviation and current (as in the early 1980s) air power ("Air Power Today").

The "History of Aviation" began in issue 1 with a seven part series on the airpower of the Vietnam War. Most of the "History of Aviation" was taken up with warfare especially World War II starting with the Blitzkrieg in issue eight and ending with defeat of Japan in issue 156. The coverage of World War 2 also included surveys of different combat roles and aircraft types.

World War I was also covered in the History of Aviation as was the Korean War, Spanish Civil War, post-World War II colonial conflicts and the Arab-Israeli Wars. In later issues the Cold War was covered in depth.

"Air Power Today" covered the then current (1980s) military situation with surveys of different types of military aircraft and combat roles and regional surveys of airpower around the world.

The history of "Commercial Aviation" was also covered in a multi-part series starting with the earliest commercial air flights and ending with general aviation and microlights near the very end of the Encyclopedia's run.

== The World's Greatest Aircraft ==
The second section of the issue was "The World's Greatest Aircraft" and was an in depth look at a major aircraft type, including a history and description of the aircraft, a cutaway drawing, a list of variants and a three-way view in colour on the centre pages. The North American Mustang was featured in issue one, with the North American XB-70 the final aircraft featured in issue 214.

== A-Z of Aircraft ==
The third section of the magazine was the "A-Z of Aircraft" which had the aim of listing and describing every aircraft ever built (at the time of publication) in alphabetical order. The A-Z began in great depth with every aircraft given its own entry however, in later issues the A-Z stopped featuring more obscure aircraft types and collected the aircraft of smaller and less well known aircraft manufacturers into a single entry.

This can be illustrated by the first and last entries in the A-Z. The first aircraft to be featured was the AAMSA A9B-M Quail (on page 14) but the last (on page 3120) was in a collected entry on Zmaj aircraft. However, based on the Zmaj entry then the last aircraft in the A-Z was the Zmaj Nebojsa.

When the A-Z was completed this section was replaced by the "Chronology of Aviation" from 1903 to 1984 and finally a history of RAF squadrons.

== Back pages ==
The final section (although it was part of the cover which was to be removed when the issue was placed in a binder) was a feature on either an air force or airline. The back cover either featured an advert for the binders or a full page photo of an aircraft. Sometimes the airforce/airline feature was omitted in favour of an order form for binders or back issues or even sometimes an advert.
