= Focke-Achgelis Fa 269 =

1940s German tiltrotor aircraft project

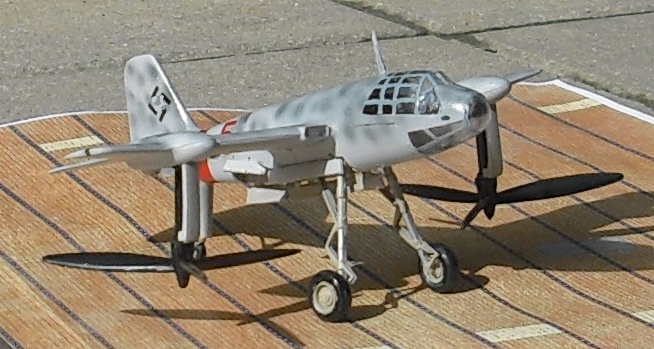
- model shown

General information
- Type: VTOL aircraft project
- Manufacturer: Focke-Achgelis
- Designer: Heinrich Focke
- Primary user: none
- Number built: 0

History
- First flight: none

The Focke-Achgelis Fa 269 was a tiltrotor VTOL aircraft project designed by Henrich Focke.

== Development ==
Conceived as a single-seat fighter, the Fa 269 project resulted from a design study order issued by the Reich Air Ministry to Focke-Achgelis in 1941. The order called for a local defence fighter which would combine the VTOL capabilities of a helicopter with the speed and economy of a conventional fixed-wing aircraft.

A large amount of wind tunnel testing was undertaken, along with work on gearboxes, drives and power-pivoting mechanisms, and a full-scale mock-up of the aircraft was built to demonstrate the VTOL concept, but much of this was destroyed by Allied bombing raids and all work was shelved in 1944, when Focke-Achgelis estimated that there was little likelihood of a practical prototype being available before 1947.

== Design ==
A mid-wing monoplane, the Fa 269 was to have been powered by a single BMW 801 air-cooled radial engine buried in the fuselage behind the cockpit, which was to have driven transverse drive shafts in the leading edges of the fixed wing, the shafts turning three-bladed rotors via synchronised gearboxes. The plane of rotation of the rotors would have been capable of being swivelled through 80° using angled extension shafts.

It was proposed that the Fa 269 would adopt a high angle of attack when at rest using extremely long undercarriage units. For vertical take-off, the rotors would be lowered till their plane of rotation was parallel with the ground. For translation to conventional flight following take-off, the extension shafts were to pivot to the rear, the rotors then behaving as pusher propellers.

== Specifications (Fa 269) ==
Data from Air International, January 1975

General characteristics

- Crew: 1
- Length: 8.93 m (29 ft 3 in)
- Wingspan: 10 m (32 ft 9 in)
- Powerplant: 1 × BMW 801 14-cylinder radial piston

Performance

- Maximum speed: 570 km/h (354 mph, 308 kn)

Armament

- 2 x 30mm MK 108 cannon
