= Auster J family =

Utility aircraft family by Auster

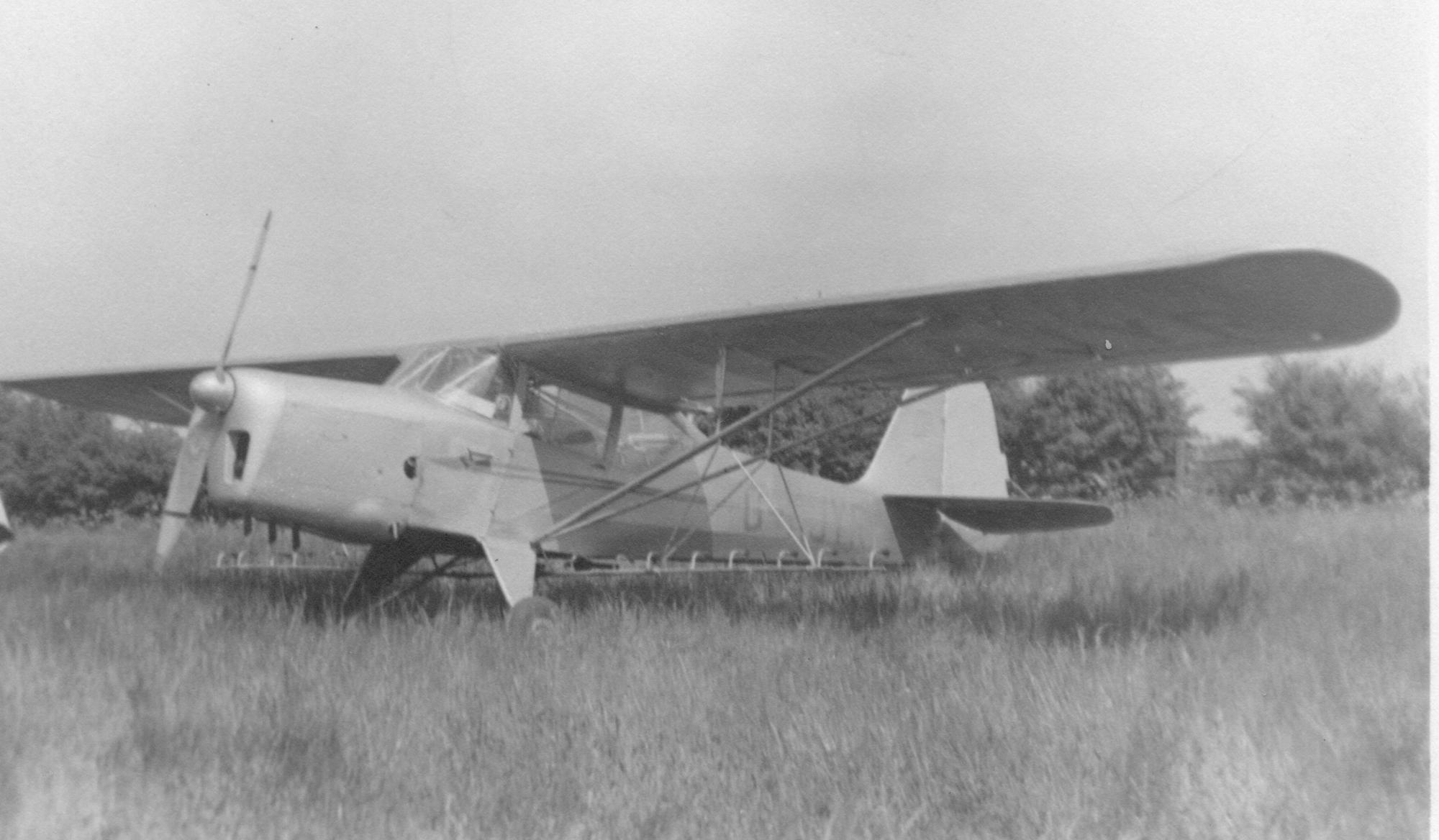
- J/1B Aiglet fitted with under-wing crop-spraying bars at Rearsby airfield, Leicestershire, in June 1951.

General information
- Type: Light civil aircraft
- National origin: United Kingdom
- Manufacturer: Auster
- Primary user: agricultural contractors and private owners
- Number built: (J/1 86) (J/5 10) (J/5 Aiglet Trainer 77) (J/5 Autocar 180) (J/5 Adventurer 59) (J/4 27) (J/3 Atom 1) ( J/2 Arrow 44) (J/1U Workmaster 10) (J/1 Autocrat 420) (Avis 2)

History
- First flight: 1945 (J/2 Arrow)
- Retired: several still airworthy in Australia and the U.K.
- Developed from: Taylorcraft Auster

The Auster J series was a family of British light civil utility aircraft developed in the 1940s and 50s by Auster at Rearsby, Leicestershire.

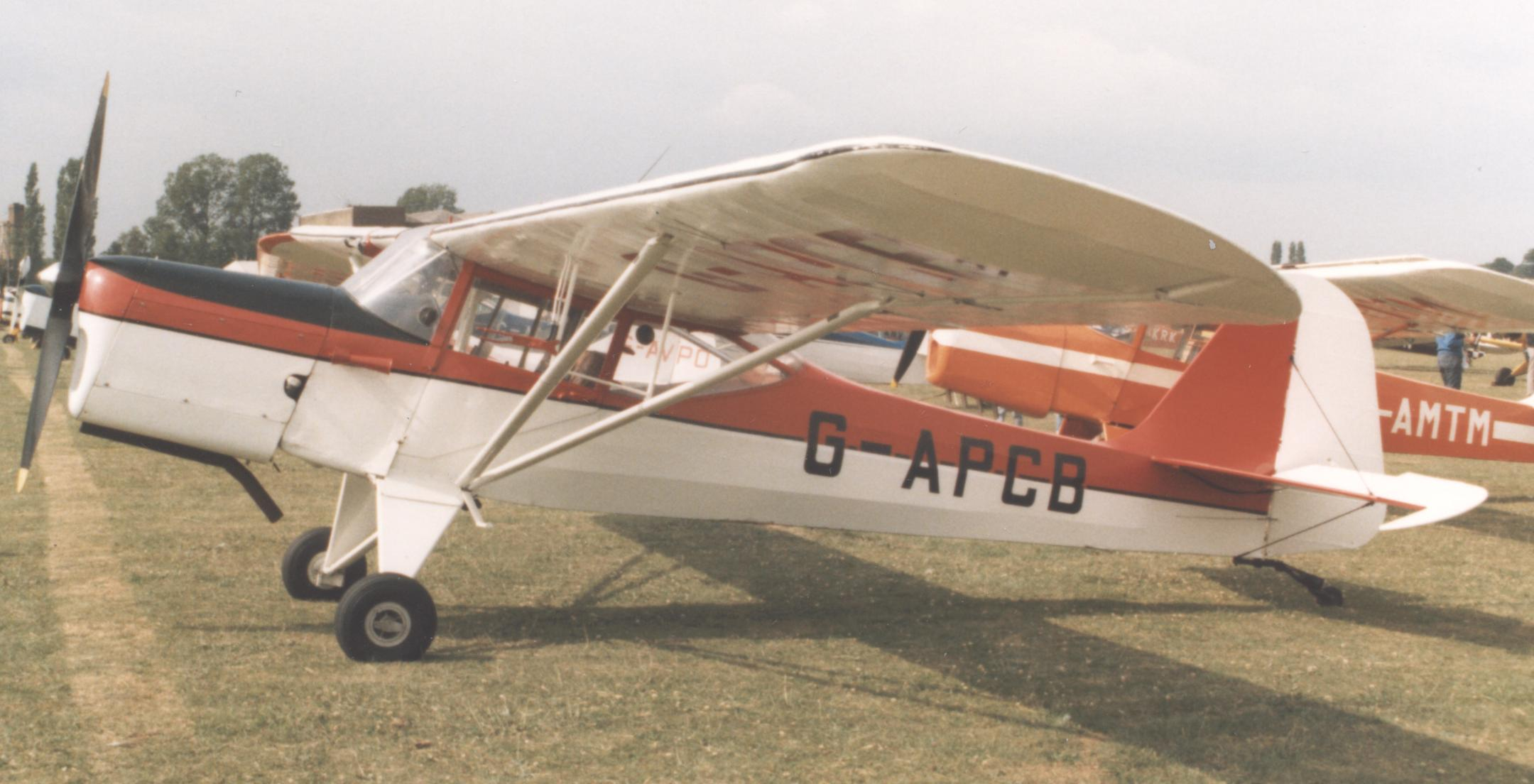
Auster J/5Q Alpine at PFA Rally at Cranfield airfield, Bedfordshire, in July 1989

== History ==
As the end of the Second World War approached the designers at Taylorcraft decided to develop a tourer version of the robust and reliable Model J AOP. V observation aircraft series. An Auster 5, registered G-AGOH, was modified to take a 100 hp (75 kW) Blackburn Cirrus II engine for trials. At the same time a prototype aircraft G-AFWN was built designated the Taylorcraft Auster V Series J/1 Autocrat. Postwar models derived from the Model J commenced with the J/1 Autocrat - (note the use of J/1, not J-1).

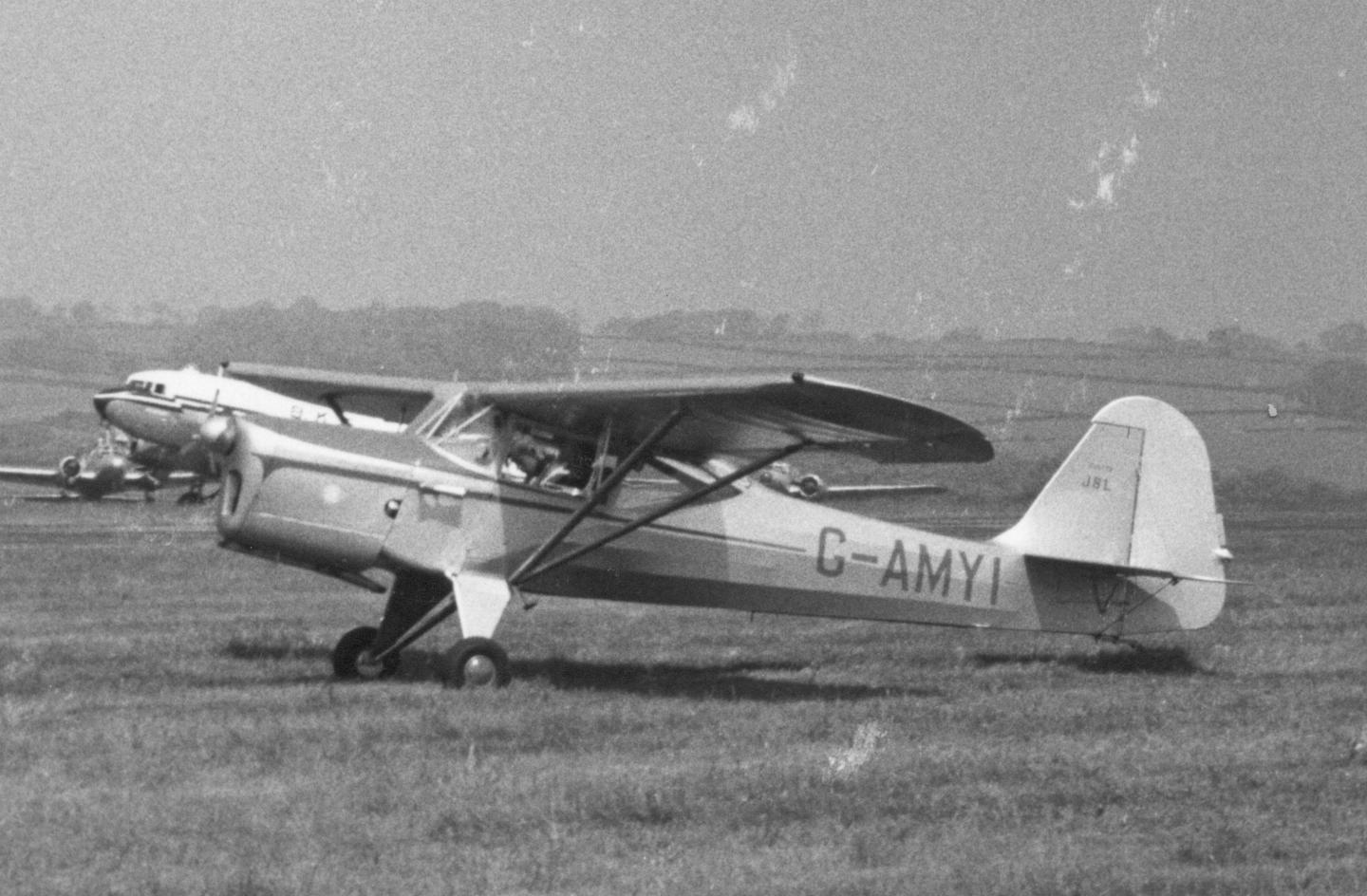
The sole J/8L Aiglet Trainer had an enlarged fin and rudder. Leeds (Yeadon) Airport May 1955

== Development ==
The first production aircraft, registered G-AGTO, was delivered in December 1945. One of the more spectacular feats of the type was the first visit of a civilian aircraft to an aircraft carrier, HMS Illustrious in the English Channel in October 1946.

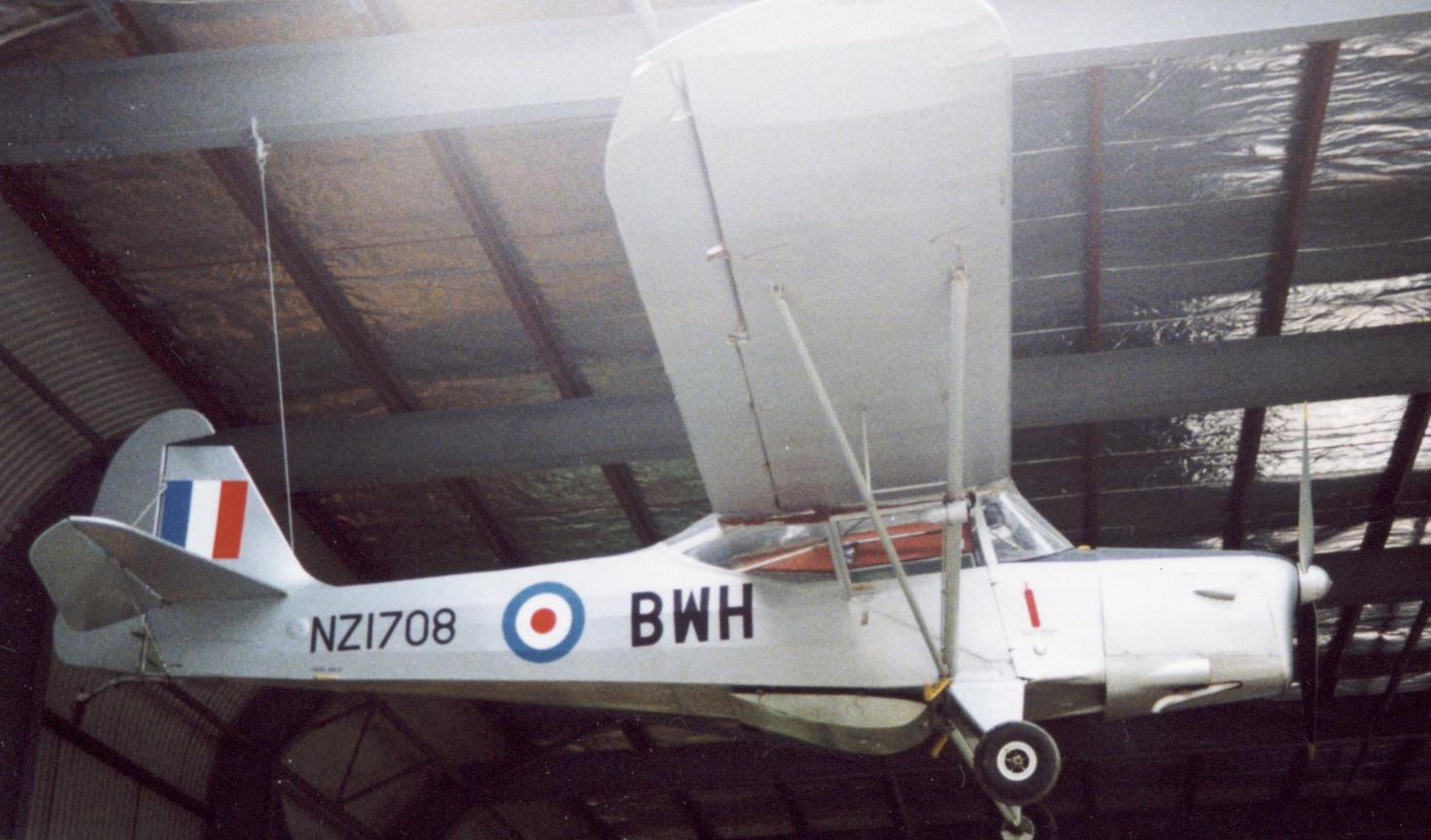
J/1B Aiglet ZK-BWH exhibited at MOTAT Auckland New Zealand in February 1992 wearing RNZAF style markings

The Autocrat became one of the most successful post-war British light aircraft, with more than 400 built before the last Rearsby-built J/1s were delivered in 1952. A large number of variants were built and the aircraft became the basis for a family of light aircraft.

The Autocrat of 1946 had achieved considerable sales success but orders died away in the late 1940s. Few sales were achieved in the important Australian market as the Autocrat's 100 h.p. engine was not powerful enough for the harsher summer conditions experienced there.

In 1950, Auster utilised an uncompleted Autocrat airframe and wing structure to produce the J/1B Aiglet. This incorporated a larger fin and rudder to compensate for the installation of a 130 h.p. de Havilland Gipsy Major engine which had been modified by the fitment of double scavenge pumps to match the cooling system.

The prototype J/1N Alpha first flew in 1950 and was followed by several other conversions of Autocrat airframes, but construction soon switched to the use of new airframes. Most sales were made in Australia and New Zealand. The majority of aircraft were exported engineless to Kingsford Smith Aviation Services in Sydney where they were completed and tested before delivery. Many J/1s were converted to J/1N Alpha standard with a higher fin and fitted with a 130 h.p. Gipsy Major engine, as used in the J/1B Aiglet.

The J/5 Adventurer three-seat high-wing monoplane was developed from the J/1 Autocrat, with extra power provided by the installation of the 130 h.p. Gipsy Major engine, to enable more flexible operations in the hotter climate of Australia and New Zealand, where most examples were sold. The J/5 series had a sloping engine bulkhead to enable a starter to be fitted, but with the disadvantage that only a ten-gallon fuel tank could be accommodated between the bulkhead and the instrument panel whereas the standard J/1, J/2 and J/4 had a 15-gallon tank. Unlike the similarly powered J/1B Aiglet and J/1N Alpha, the Adventurer retained the smaller tail surfaces of the Autocrat, the new engine being set back sufficiently far for the original fin area to remain sufficient.

The prototype Adventurer was converted to the new standard from a J/1 Autocrat c/n 2093 and first flew on 15 November 1947. This was followed by a further 58 production examples delivered between 1948 and 1952.

The company recognised a need for a four-seat touring aircraft to complement the three-seat J/1 Autocrat, developing the J/5 Autocar featuring wing-root fuel tanks and an enlarged cabin. The prototype Autocar G-AJYK, a model J/5B, first flew in August 1949 and was exhibited at the 1949 Farnborough Air Show in September. A demand for a more powerful version for the tropics produced the J/5G Autocar powered by a 155 hp (116 kW) Blackburn Cirrus Major engine, first flown in 1951. This was followed by the J/5P Autocar, powered by a Gipsy Major 10 engine.

The need for rugged inexpensive trainer aircraft throughout the Commonwealth spurred Auster to develop the Aiglet Trainer, which, despite its name, had nothing to do with the J/1B Aiglet, being an aerobatic development of the J/5 Autocar, with new (shorter) 32 ft wingspan and stressed for aerobatics, the prototype flying for the first time on 2 June 1951. The J/5F Aiglet Trainer was powered by a Gipsy Major 1 engine, and the J/5L Aiglet Trainer had a Gipsy Major 10 engine. Most Aiglet Trainers were bought by private pilots and flying clubs, but 15 went to the Pakistan Air Force, 14 to the Iran Civil Aviation Club and two to the Lebanese Air Force.

The final development of the Auster J series was the J/1Y, which was subsequently re-designated and produced as the Auster D.5.

== Auster J/1U Workmaster ==
Following the experience of developing the J/1B Aiglet agricultural aircraft, and at the request of the Crop Culture company on the Isle of Wight, Auster developed a more powerful successor the J/1U Workmaster. Using the basic Autocrat fuselage, it was strengthened and had dorsal fin fillets added, low-pressure tyres and a 180 hp (134 kW) Lycoming O-360-A engine.

Of traditional high-wing layout, it carries 90 gallons of spray fluid in a tank beside the pilot, an extra seat being provided for a passenger. The Lycoming engine driving a McCauley v.p. propeller giving it ample power; with slotted ailerons, balanced tail controls and oversize tyres providing good handling during operations in restricted spaces and rough surfaces.

The aircraft were fitted with Micronair rotary atomizers for crop spraying and a 100-imperial-gallon (455-litre) chemical tank in the fuselage, with an emergency dump valve allowing the tank to be emptied in 5 seconds. The Workmasters were mainly operated in West Africa, three returned to the UK later and are currently (2018) on the U.K. civil aircraft register.

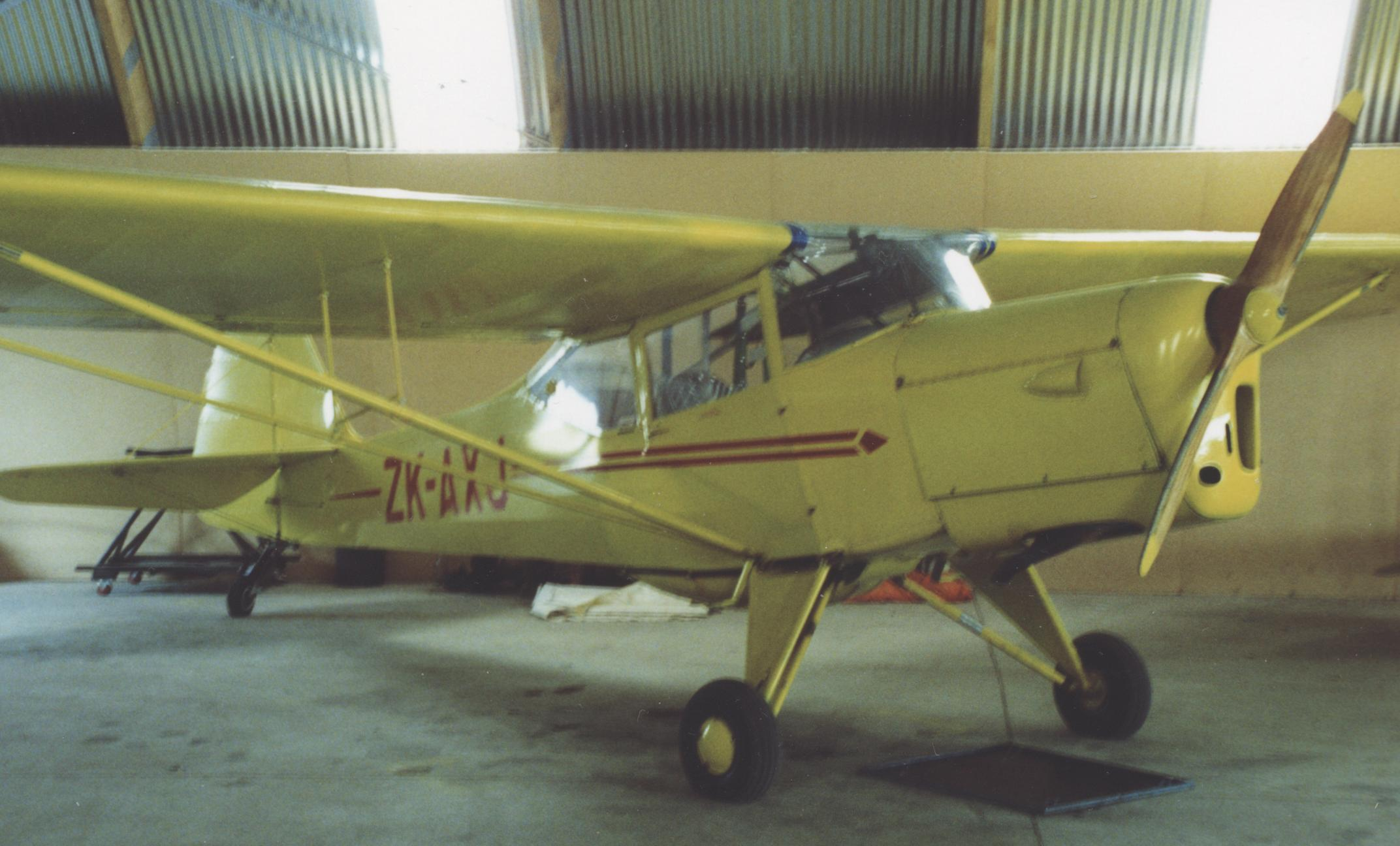
J/5 Adventurer at Ardmore Airport, Auckland, New Zealand in February 1992

== Auster J/5 Q & R Alpine ==
The J/5R Alpine was a hybrid aircraft, with six aircraft assembled using J/5 Aiglet Trainer fuselages fitted with the J/1 Autocrat wings, powered by a de Havilland Gipsy Major 10 engine. A lower powered version was built as the J/5Q Alpine, powered by a de Havilland Gipsy Major 1 engine, of which four were built.

== Auster Avis ==
The Auster Avis featured a redesigned fuselage incorporating four doors and a circular cross-section towards the tail, new undercarriage, and new wing flaps. It was planned in two versions, the Mk 1 for civil use, and the Mk 2 for military and air ambulance duties. However, only two prototypes were built, and Auster abandoned the project in favour of the J/5 Autocar.

== Auster Two-seaters ==
=== Auster J/2 Arrow ===
The Arrow was designed as a successor to the pre-war Taylorcraft Plus C monoplane. A development aircraft, a side-by-side two-seater, first flew in 1946 powered by Lycoming O-145-B3 flat four air-cooled engined. Import restrictions on the sale of American engines resulted in the nearly all of the 44 aircraft built being exported, mainly to Australia.

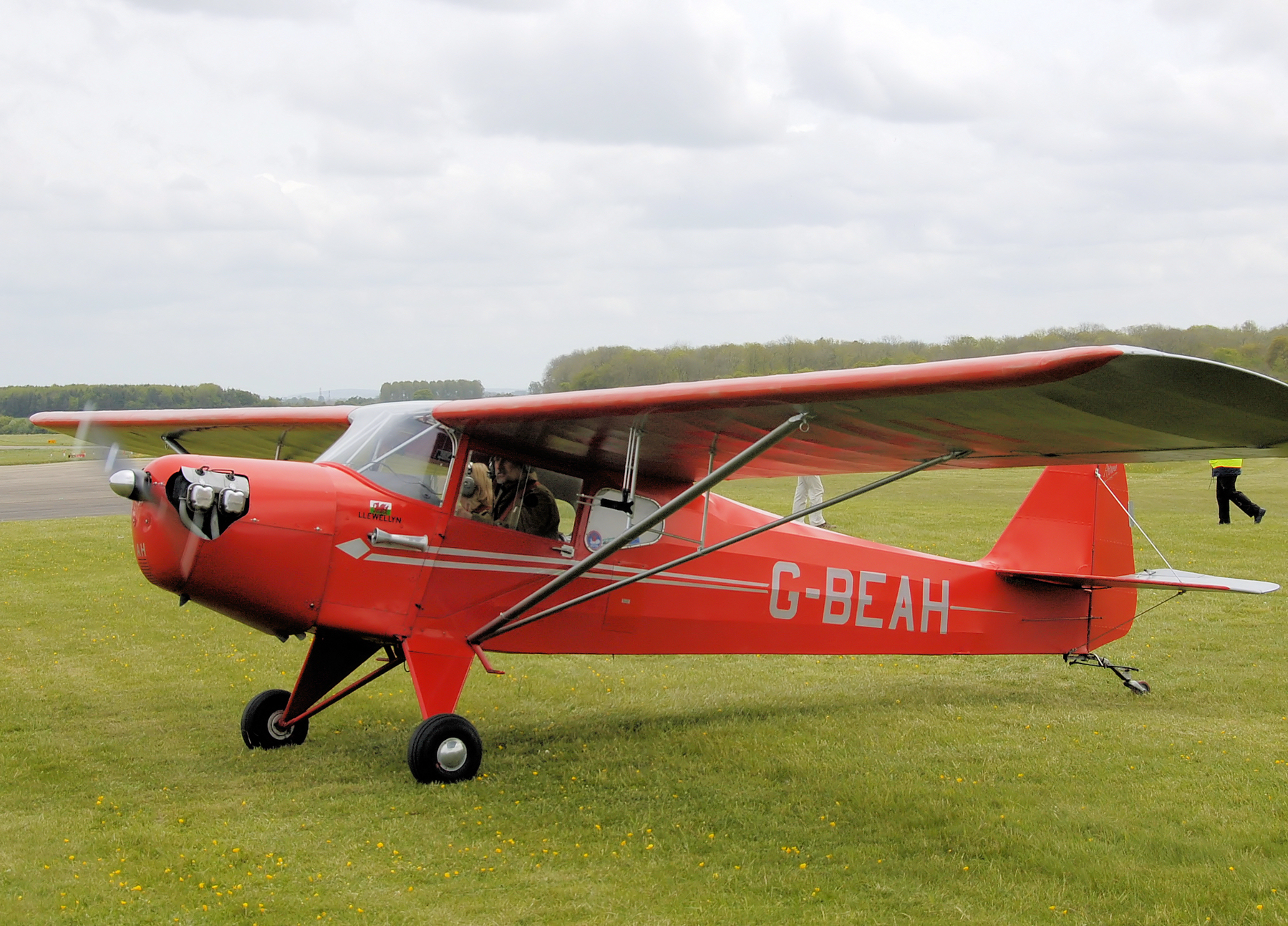
A J/2 Arrow

=== Auster J/3 Atom ===
The Atom was an attempt to create a lower-powered version of the J/2 Arrow. A modified Arrow was flown with a 65 hp Continental A65-12 engine and designated the J/3 Atom. Only the prototype, registered G-AHSY, (c/n 2250) was built as the aircraft was not developed further. Another example G-AJIJ (c/n 2401) was not completed.

The sole J/3 was dismantled at Rearsby in 1950 and was rebuilt to J/4 standard with a new registration G-AJYX and c/n 2941. It crashed near Melton Mowbray on 22 April 1951 after a pilotless take-off from Rearsby. The Continental A65 engine had been replaced by a 95 hp Blackburn Cirrus Minor II.

=== Auster J/4 ===
Sales in the UK of the American engined J/2 Arrow were limited by import restrictions on the engines, so Auster re-engined the aircraft with a 90 hp Blackburn Cirrus Minor I. The first aircraft flew towards the end of 1946. The two-seat aircraft proved less popular than the company's three-seat J/1 Autocrat and only 27 aircraft were built, a number of which were exported to Australia, where they were known as the Auster J/4 Archer.

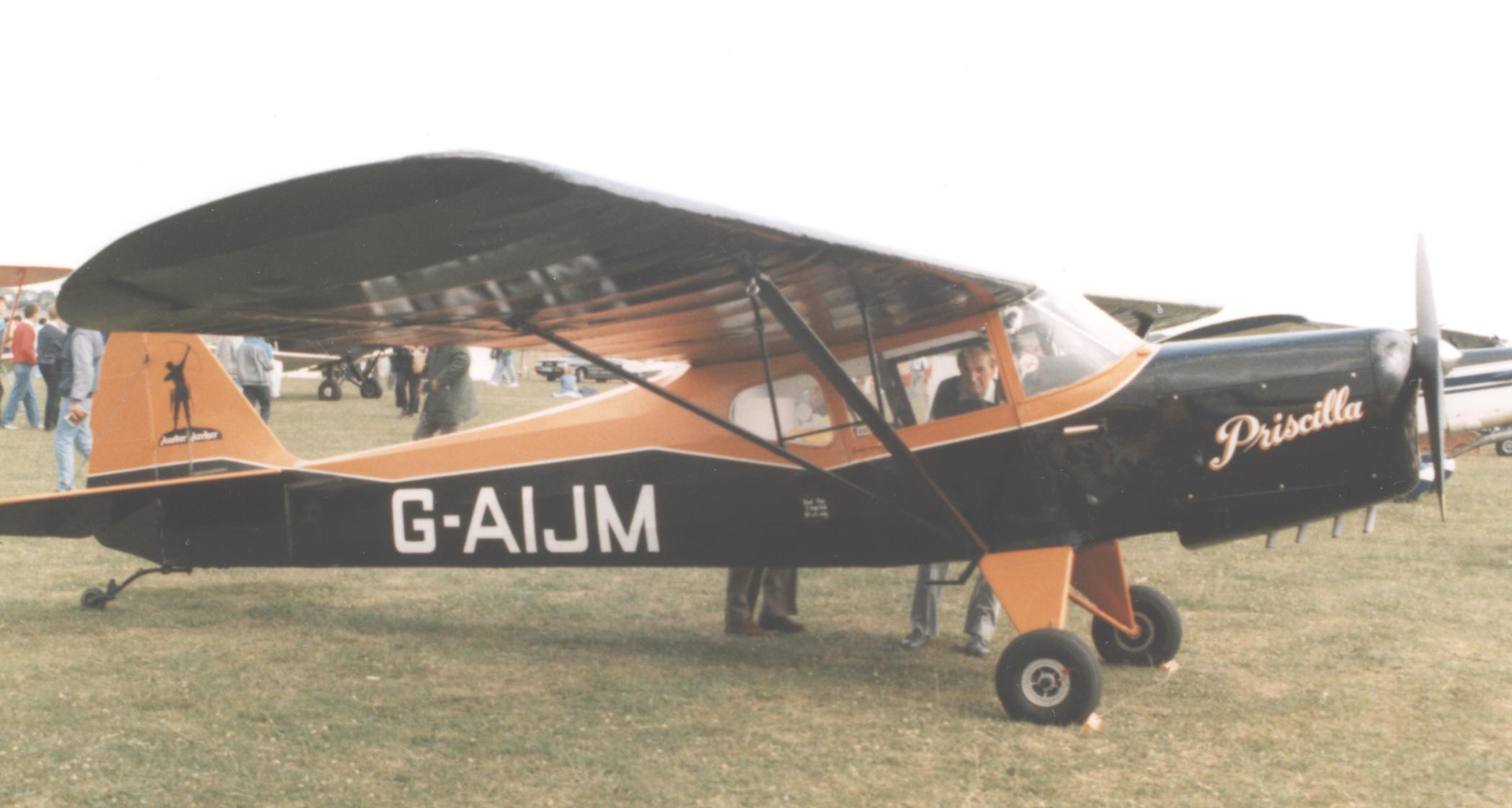
Auster J/4 at PFA Rally held at Cranfield, Bedfordshire, in July 1989

On 30 August 1955 an Australian aircraft VH-AET managed to take-off from Bankstown Airport Sydney without a pilot. It was followed out to sea by Royal Australian Navy Hawker Sea Furys and shot down.

== Operational history ==
The Autocar has been primarily operated by private pilot owners but some were used by small charter firms in the UK and elsewhere as taxi and photographic aircraft. Pest Control Ltd took delivery of five J/5G Autocars in 1952 for crop spraying operations in Sudan.

The Aiglet was particularly suited to use by agricultural spraying and dusting contractors. The spray bars were installed using supports on the Aiglet's fuselage undersurfaces and the wing struts. Most sales were to Australia and New Zealand but seven were supplied to Aerial Spraying Contractors Ltd of Boston, Lincolnshire. These were flown out to Sudan in autumn 1950 and within a month had rid 17,000 acres of farmland of locusts and other insect pests.

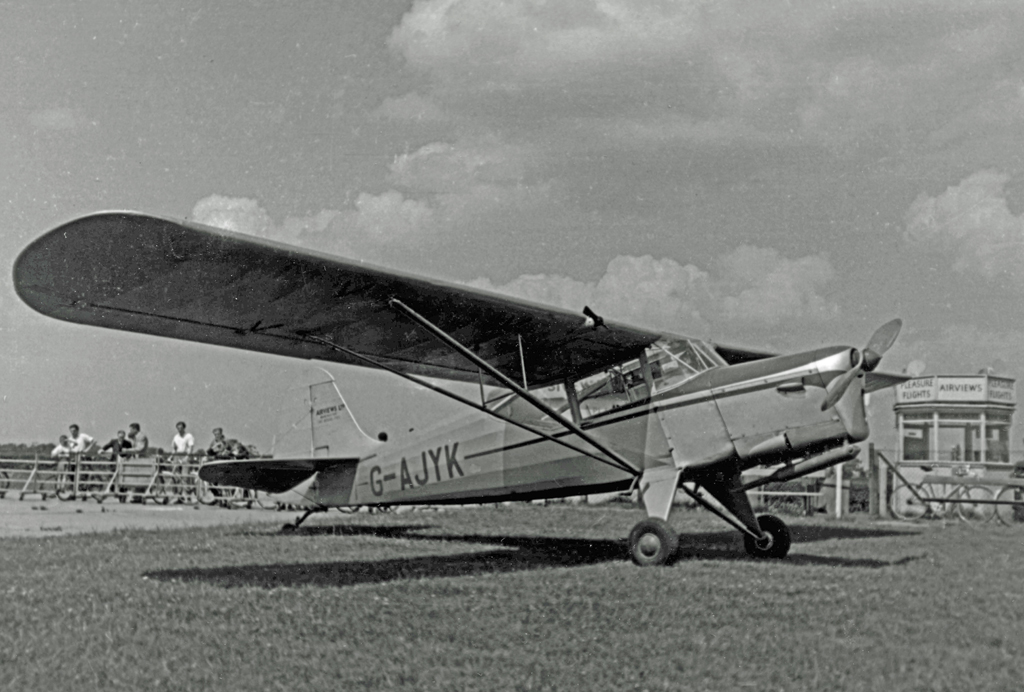
The prototype J/5B Autocar of Airviews Ltd at Manchester Airport in 1950

The agricultural task required operation at very low heights in conditions of extreme heat and inevitably resulted in the loss of many Aiglets in accidents. After withdrawal from crop-spraying use during the late 1950s and early 1960s, the survivors were purchased by aerial photo contractors, aero clubs and private owners. Many of these aircraft were fitted with an extra fuel tank beneath the fuselage, as shown in the adjacent photograph.

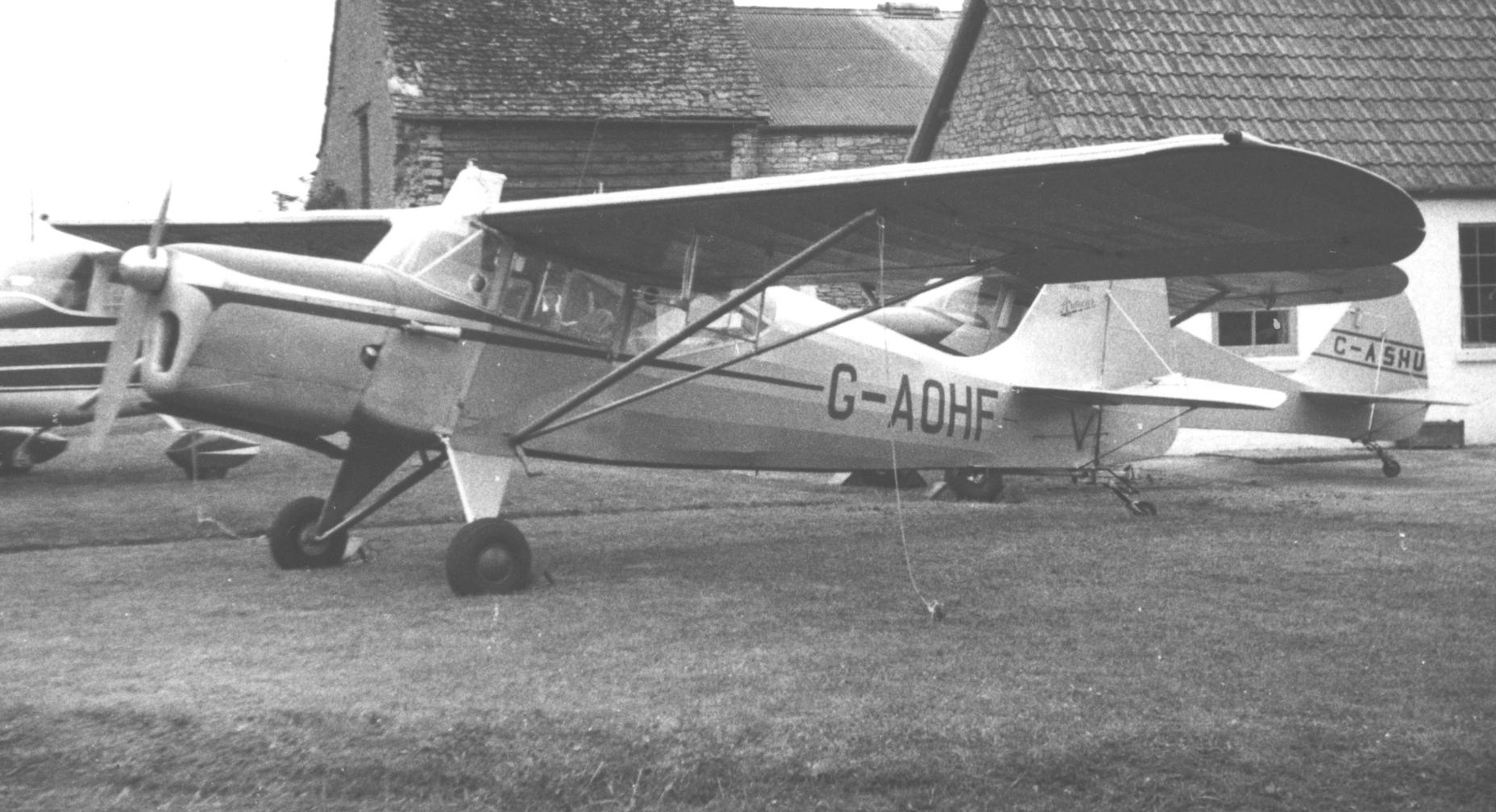
J/5P Autocar at Kidlington Airport, Oxford in 1966

In 2009, several Aiglets remain in airworthy condition in Australia and New Zealand and three were active in the United Kingdom.

Most Adventurers were sold to private pilot owners in Australia and New Zealand. Eleven Adventurers were still in service in Australia in 2009 and one in New Zealand (see image). Six Adventurers were sold to the Royal New Zealand Air Force (RNZAF) and four to the Royal Rhodesian Air Force (RRAF). Five examples were completed for agricultural use as the J/5A Cropduster and served in Africa and Pakistan.

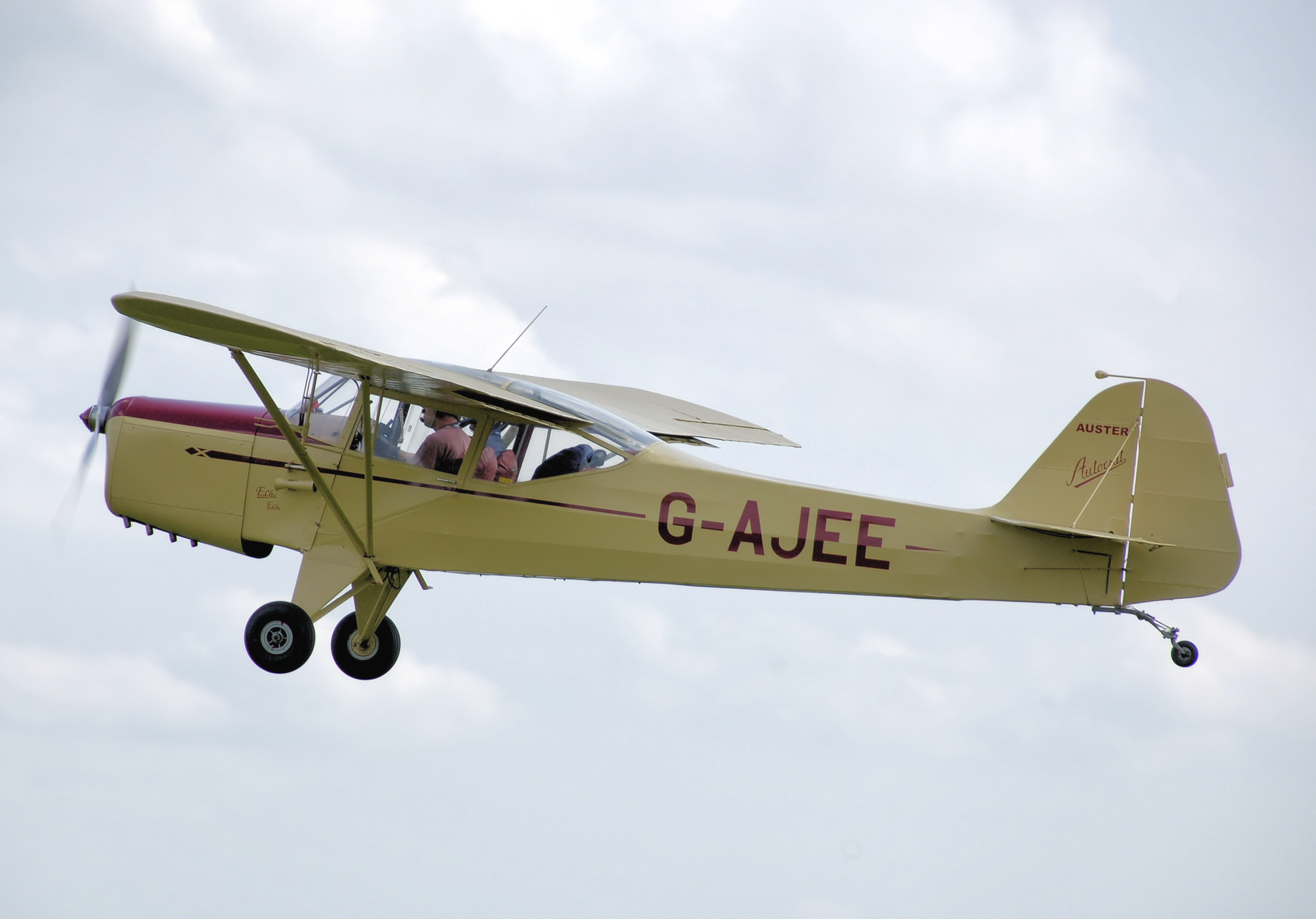
J/1 Autocrat G-AJEE

=== Civil operators ===
Israel

- Israeli Air Force (J/1)

Jordan

- Royal Jordanian Air Force (J/1), (J/5 Aiglet Trainer)

Rhodesia

- Rhodesian Air Force - one aircraft only (J/1)

Southern Rhodesia

- Southern Rhodesian Air Force - one aircraft only (J/1) - five aircraft (J/5 Aiglet Trainer)

Lebanon

- Lebanese Air Force - two aircraft (J/5 aiglet Trainer)

Pakistan

- Pakistan Air Force - 15 aircraft (J/5 aiglet Trainer)

Australia

- Royal Australian Navy (J/5 Autocar)
  - 723 Squadron RAN
  - 724 Squadron RAN
  - 725 Squadron RAN

New Zealand

- Royal New Zealand Air Force (J/5 Autocar), (J/5 Adventurer)
  - No. 3 Squadron RNZAF
  - No. 6 Squadron RNZAF
  - No. 42 Squadron RNZAF
  - Air Reconnaissance Flight

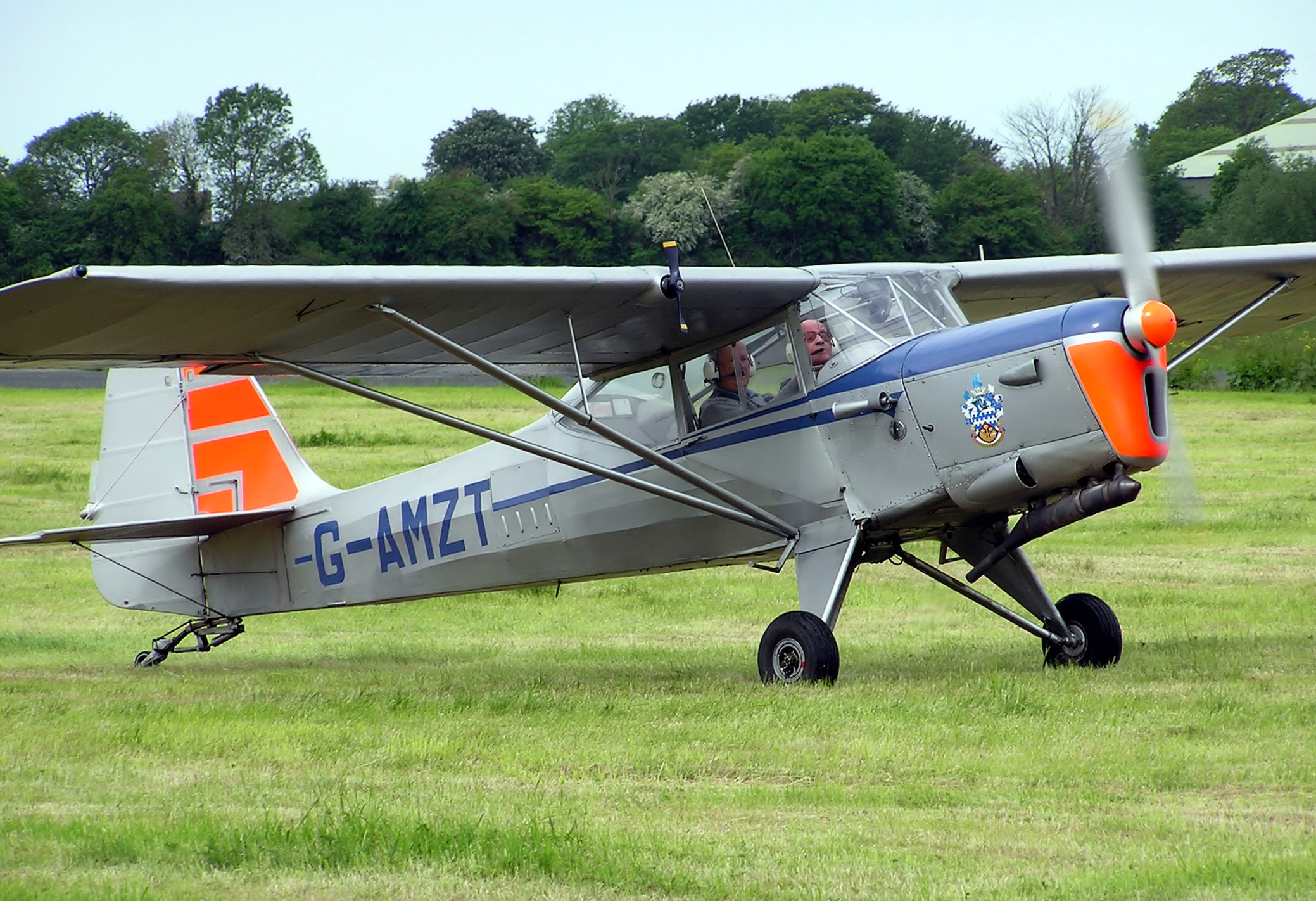
Auster J/5F Aiglet Trainer

== Civil operators (J/5 Autocar) ==
United Kingdom

- Airviews Ltd (J/5 Autocar)
- Anglian Air Charter (J/5 Autocar)
- Bees Flight (J/5 Autocar)
- Bristol Aero Engines (J/5 Autocar)
- Ferranti (J/5 Autocar)
- Gloster Aircraft (J/5 Autocar)
- Hunting Aerosurveys (J/5 Autocar)
- Pest Control Ltd (J/5 Autocar)
- Southend Flying School (J/5 Autocar)

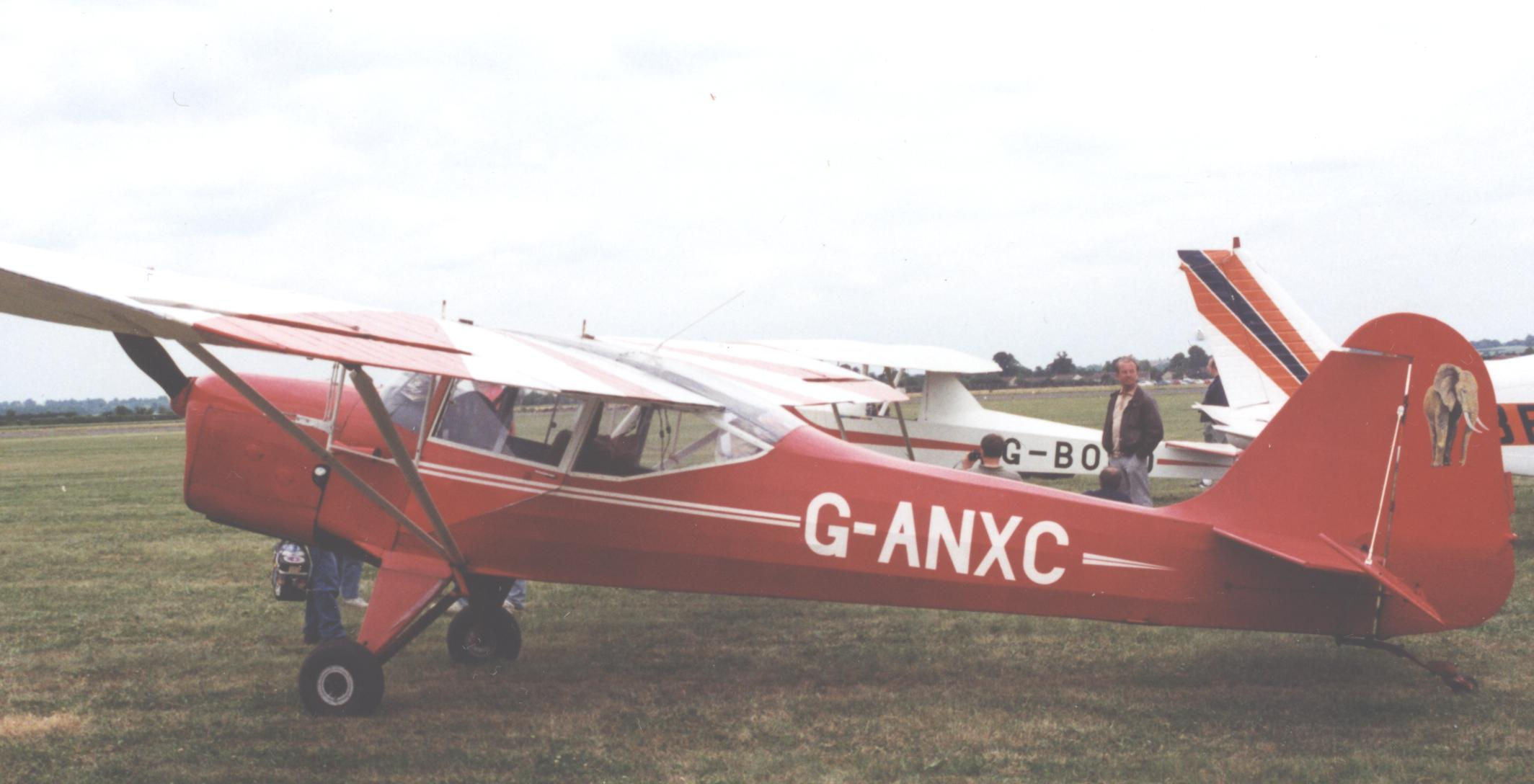
Auster J/5R Alpine at Wellesbourne Mountford Airfield in June 1996

== Variants ==
Auster J/1 Autocrat
Production version with Blackburn Cirrus Major engine. Several later fitted with engines up to the 150 h.p. Lycoming O-320-A1A.
Auster J/1A Autocrat
additional (fourth-seat) for joyriding.
Auster J/1N Alpha
powered by a de Havilland Gipsy Major I engine and with enlarged tail surfaces.
Auster J/1S Autocrat
powered by a 145 h.p. de Havilland Gipsy Major 10 Mk 2-2 engine.
Auster J/1U Workmaster
An agricultural workhorse using a strengthened Autocrat airframe with dorsal fin fillets added, low pressure tyres and a 180 hp (134 kW) Lycoming engine. Spray equipment was suspended from the fuselage and wings, fed by a 90 gal tank; 10 built.
Auster J/1Y
Developed from the J/1U for a Portuguese contract, powered by a 160 hp (119 kW) Avco Lycoming O-320 engine, subsequently re-designated and produced as the Auster D.5.
Auster J/2 Arrow
A two-seater development powered by a Lycoming O-145-B3 engine.
Auster J/3 Atom
Intended as a lightweight, low-powered version of the J/2, the sole J/3, powered by a 65 hp Continental A65-12, was not a success and further work was abandoned.
Auster J/4
Sales of the American engined J/2 were limited by import restrictions on the engine in the English market so Auster re-engined the two seater with a 90 hp Blackburn Cirrus Minor I to stimulate home sales.
Auster J/4 Archer
The name for the J/4s sold in Australia.
Auster J/5
Civil version, also operated by the RNZAF and RRAF (54 aircraft)
Auster J/5A
Agricultural version with spray bars, spray tank etc. (5 aircraft)
Auster J/5B Autocar
production version, 82 built.
Auster J/5E Autocar
prototype export version with a Blackburn Cirrus Major 3 engine.
Auster J/5F Aiglet Trainer
Production version, 92 built.
Auster J/5G Autocar
export version with a Blackburn Cirrus Major 3 engine, 94 built.
Auster J/5GL
One Auster J/5G fitted with a Lycoming piston engine.
Auster J/5H Autocar
with Blackburn Cirrus Major 2 engine, one rebuilt from J/5B
Auster J/5K Aiglet Trainer
Blackburn Cirrus Major 3 engine, one built.
Auster J/5L Aiglet Trainer
de Havilland Gipsy Major 1 engine. 27 built.
Auster J/5P Autocar
version with a de Havilland Gipsy Major 1 engine, 24 built.
Auster J/5Q Alpine
Lower powered version of the J/5R with a de Havilland Gipsy Major 1 engine, 4 built.
Auster J/5R Alpine
production version with de Havilland Gipsy Major 10 engine, 6 built.
Auster J/5T Autocar
development aircraft with 185 hp (138 kW) Continental E-185-10 piston engine, one built (G-25-4, c/n 3421).
Auster J/5V Autocar
development aircraft with 160 hp (119 kW) Avco Lycoming O-320 engine, one built.
Auster J/8L Aiglet Trainer
J/5K re-engined with a de Havilland Gipsy Major 1 engine.

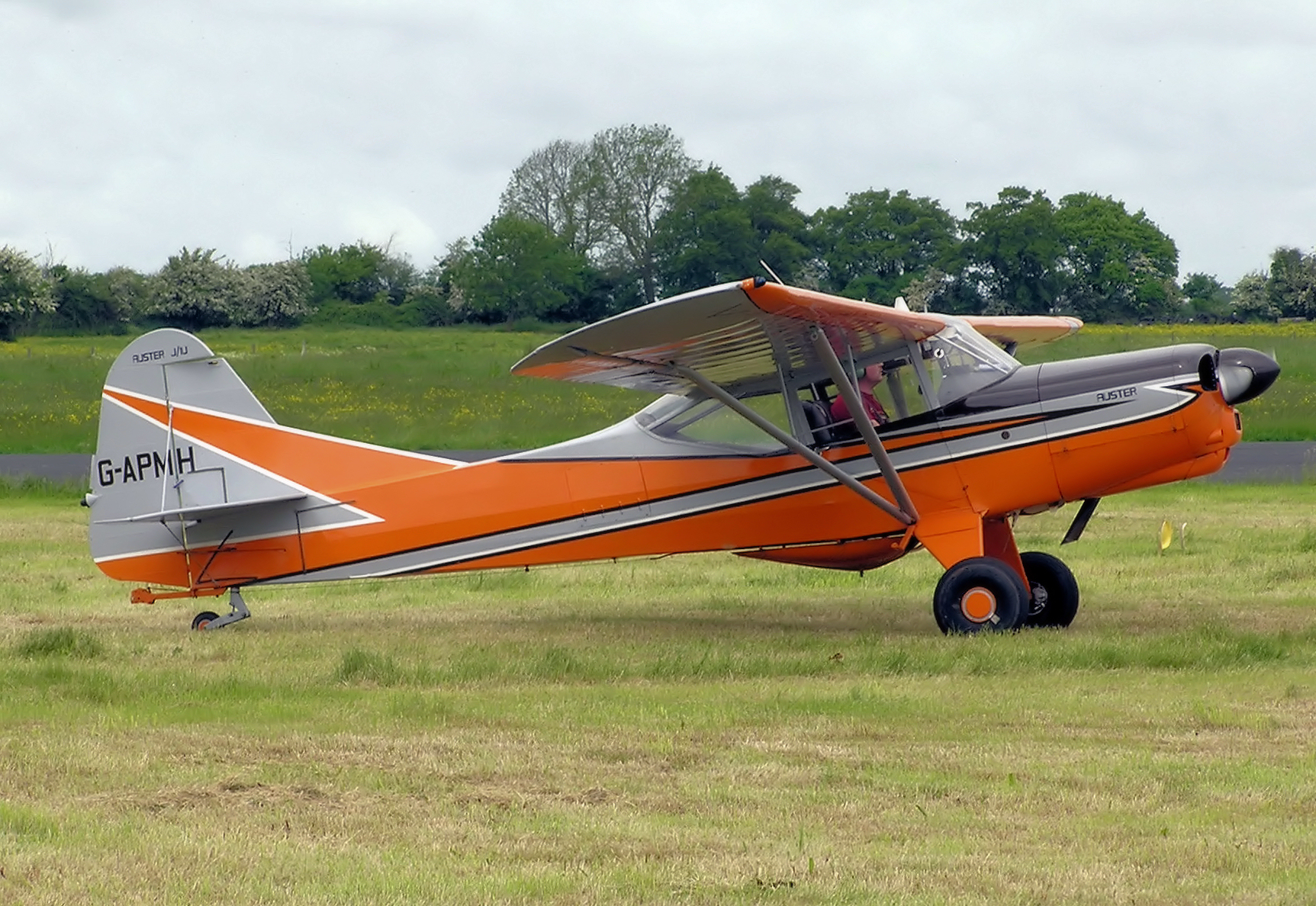
J/1U Workmaster, built 1958

== Specifications (J/1B) ==
Data from Jackson, 1973, p. 70)

General characteristics

- Crew: 1
- Capacity: agricultural materials or two passengers
- Length: 23 ft 8 in (7.21 m)
- Wingspan: 36 ft 0 in (10.97 m)
- Height: 6 ft 6 in (1.98 m)
- Wing area: 185 sq ft (17.19 m^{2})
- Empty weight: 1,223 lb (555 kg)
- Gross weight: 2,000 lb (907 kg)
- Powerplant: 1 × de Havilland Gipsy Major 1 4-cylinder inverted air-cooled in-line , 130 hp (97 kW)

Performance

- Maximum speed: 126 mph (203 km/h, 109 kn)
- Cruise speed: 105 mph (169 km/h, 91 kn)
- Range: 220 mi (354 km, 190 nmi)
- Service ceiling: 18,000 ft (5,486 m)

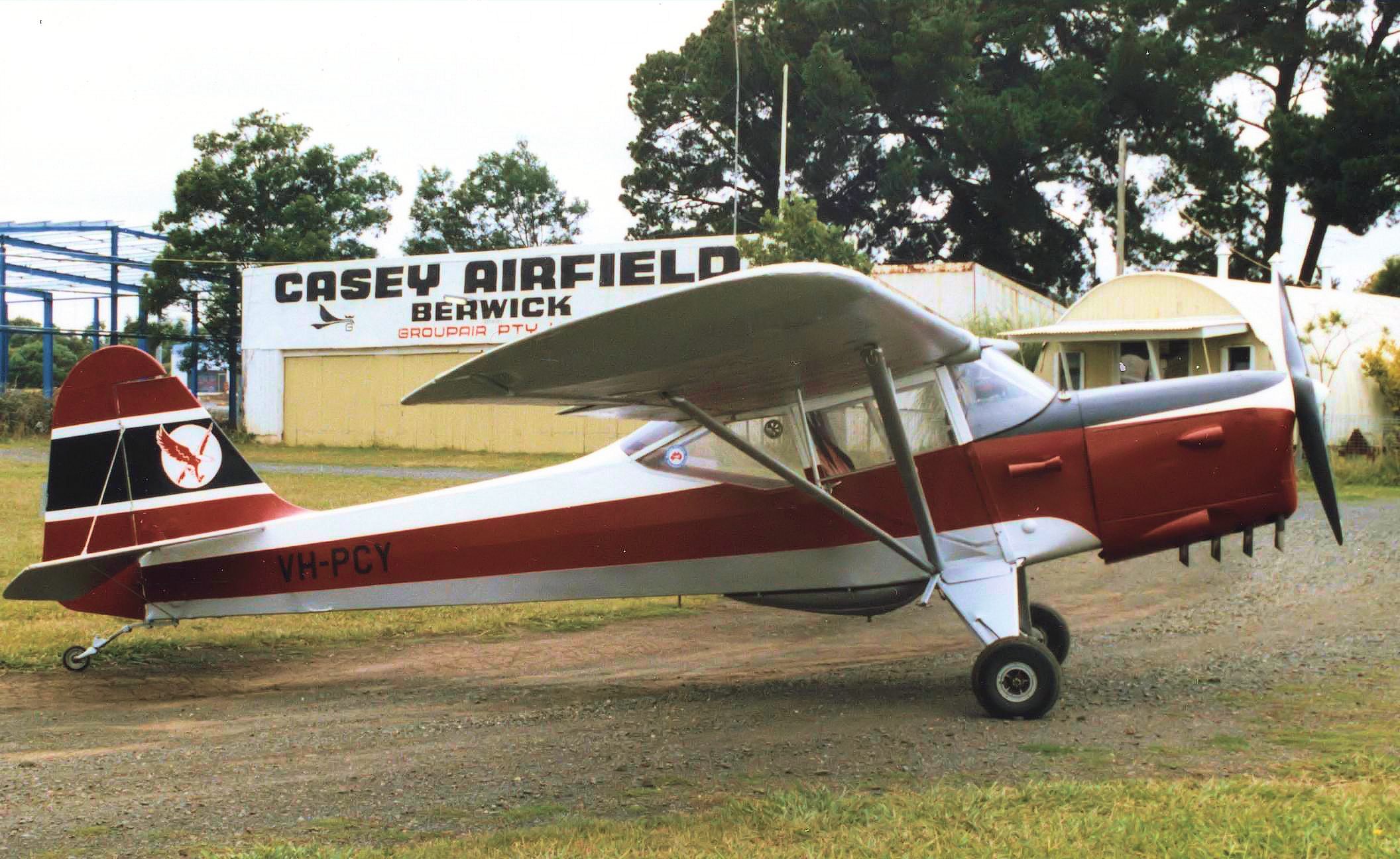
Auster J/1N Alpha in British Eagle colours at Casey Airfield, Berwick, Victoria, Australia in 1988
