= Auster D.4 =

D.4
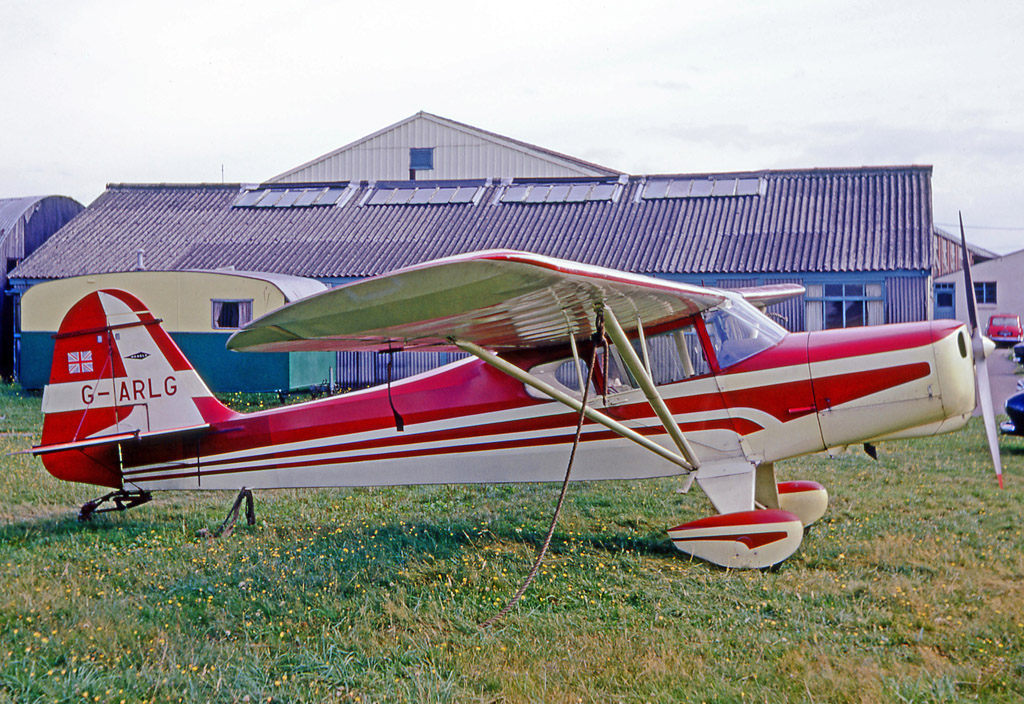
- The sixth UK built Auster D4 outside the Rearsby factory in August 1967

General information
- Type: Utility aircraft
- Manufacturer: Auster, OGMA
- Status: one example still active in UK in 2018
- Primary user: Portuguese Government
- Number built: 15

History
- Introduction date: 1960
- First flight: 12 February 1960
- Developed from: Auster Arrow

The Auster D.4 was a two-seat British light aircraft, a development of the Auster Arrow with a horizontally opposed Lycoming engine, which originated from a Portuguese Air Force requirement for a liaison/training aircraft. Six were built by Auster Aircraft at their Rearsby, Leicestershire, factory, of which five went to Portugal, and nine more were built under licence in Portugal by the Oficinas Gerais de Material Aeronáutico OGMA from sets of components built by Auster and shipped from Rearsby. The original contract was for 25 sets of components but this was reduced in favour of the same number of additional Auster D5/160 sets.

== Operational history ==
Most D4 aircraft were operated in Portugal by government sponsored groups. One example is still active (2018) owned by a UK-based private pilot owner.

== Operators ==
Portugal

- Portuguese Air Force

== Specifications ==
Data from British Civil Aircraft since 1919: Volume I.

General characteristics

- Crew: 1
- Capacity: 2 passengers
- Length: 23 ft 4 1/2 in (7.125 m)
- Wingspan: 36 ft 0 in (10.97 m)
- Height: 7 ft 11 in (2.41 m)
- Wing area: 185 sq ft (17.2 m^{2})
- Empty weight: 1,232 lb (559 kg)
- Gross weight: 1,900 lb (862 kg)
- Powerplant: 1 × Lycoming O-235 air-cooled flat-four engine, 108 hp (81 kW)

Performance

- Maximum speed: 110 mph (180 km/h, 96 kn)
- Cruise speed: 92 mph (148 km/h, 80 kn)
- Range: 500 mi (800 km, 430 nmi)
- Service ceiling: 13,200 ft (4,000 m)
- Rate of climb: 620 ft/min (3.1 m/s)
