= Auster Workmaster =

Agricultural monoplane

J/1U Workmaster
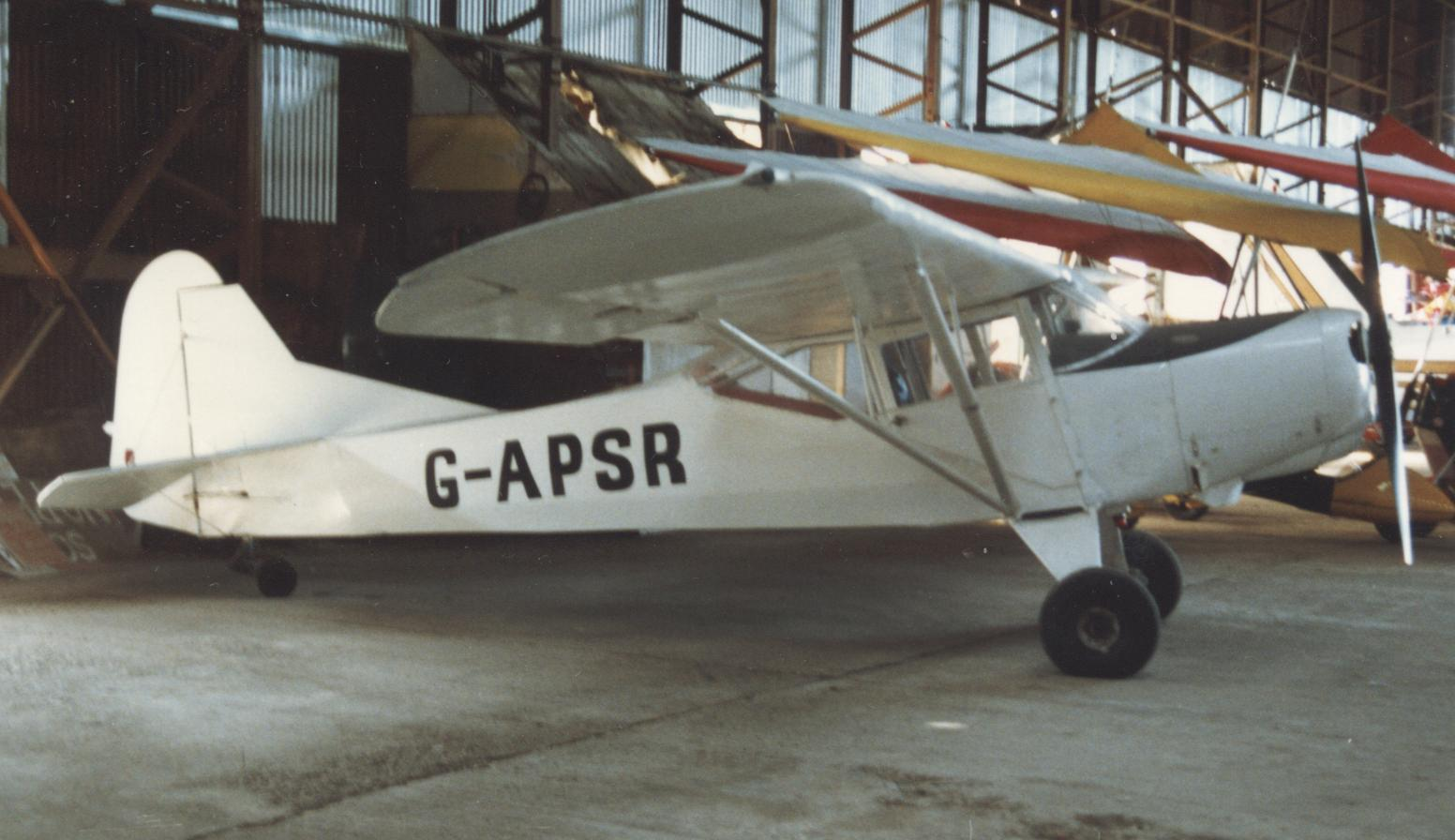
- J/1U Workmaster at Shobdon airfield, Herefordshire, in April 1987

General information
- Type: Agricultural aircraft
- Manufacturer: Auster Aircraft Limited
- Primary user: Crop Culture (Overseas) Limited
- Number built: 10

History
- Introduction date: 1958
- First flight: 1958
- Developed from: Auster Autocrat

The Auster J/1U Workmaster is a late 1950s British single-engined single-seat high-wing agricultural monoplane built by Auster Aircraft Limited at Rearsby, Leicestershire. Of traditional high-wing layout, it carries 90 gallons of spray fluid in a tank beside the pilot, an extra seat being provided for a passenger. The Lycoming 0-360-A engine of 180 h.p. driving a McCauley v.p. propeller giving it ample power; and slotted ailerons and balanced tail controls providing good handling. Oversize tyres were fitted. Take-off run at 2,550 lb gross weight and cruising speed at 65 per cent power are respectively 180 yd and 88 miles per hour (142 km/h). Britten-Norman spray gear was provided by Crop Culture, and this company ordered nine Workmasters.

== History ==
Following the experience of developing the J/1B Aiglet agricultural aircraft, Auster developed a more powerful successor the J/1U Workmaster. Using the basic Autocrat fuselage it was strengthened and had dorsal fin fillets added, low pressure tyres and a 180 hp (134 kW) Avco Lycoming engine.

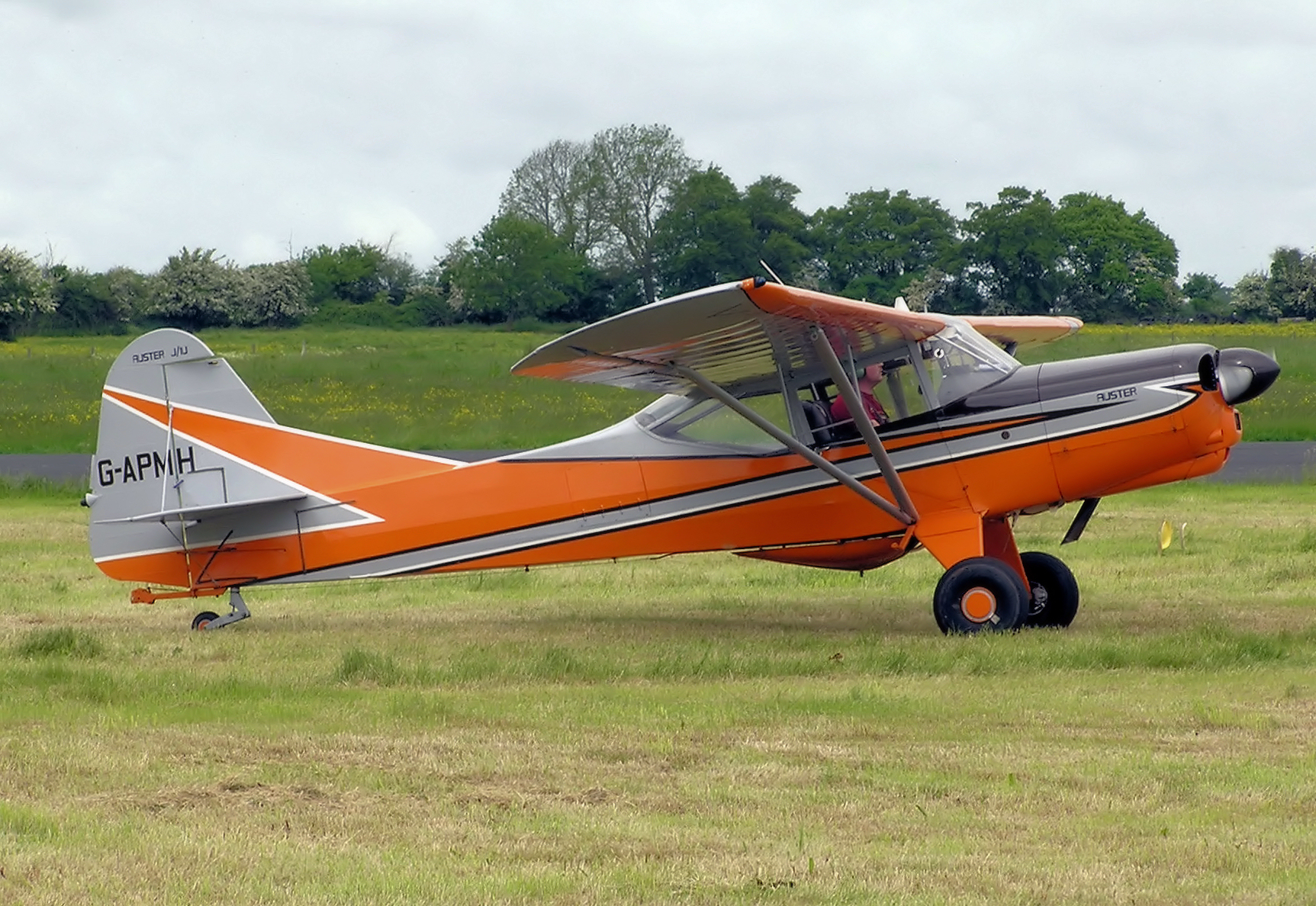
J/1U Workmaster, built 1958

The aircraft were fitted with Britten-Norman rotary atomizers for crop spraying and a 100 imperial gallon (455 litre) chemical tank in the fuselage. An emergency dump valve allowed the tank to be emptied in 5 seconds. The Workmasters were mainly operated in West Africa, three later returning and are currently (2009) on the U.K. civil aircraft register.

== Specifications (J/1U) ==
Data from Jane's all the World's Aircraft 1959-60

General characteristics

- Crew: 1
- Capacity: 1 passenger, with spray tank of 100 imp gal (120 US gal; 450 L) capacity
- Length: 23 ft 5 in (7.14 m)
- Wingspan: 36 ft (11 m)
- Height: 6 ft 2 in (1.88 m)
- Wing area: 185 sq ft (17.2 m^{2})
- Aspect ratio: 7
- Airfoil: NACA23012
- Gross weight: 2,350 lb (1,066 kg) typical with 50 imp gal (60 US gal; 230 L) of spray liquid
- Max takeoff weight: 2,650 lb (1,202 kg)
- Fuel capacity: Fuel: 32 imp gal (38 US gal; 150 L) ; Oil: 1.75 imp gal (2.10 US gal; 8.0 L)
- Powerplant: 1 × Lycoming O-360-A 4-cylinder air-cooled horizontally-opposed piston engine, 180 hp (130 kW)
- Propellers: 2-bladed McCauley variable-pitch propeller

Performance

- Maximum speed: 109 mph (175 km/h, 95 kn) at 2,350 lb (1,070 kg) at 1,000 ft (300 m)
- Cruise speed: 93 mph (150 km/h, 81 kn) at 2,350 lb (1,070 kg) at 1,000 ft (300 m)
- Stall speed: 34 mph (55 km/h, 30 kn) at 2,350 lb (1,070 kg) (flaps down)
- Recommended spraying speed: 60–80 mph (52–70 kn; 97–129 km/h)
- Rate of climb: 710 ft/min (3.6 m/s) at 2,350 lb (1,070 kg) with flaps
- Take-off run: 495 ft (151 m) in zero wind
- Take off-run to 50 ft (15 m): 1,980 ft (600 m) in zero wind
