= Auster Atlantic =

1950s British light aircraft prototype

C6 Atlantic

General information
- Type: Four-seat cabin monoplane
- National origin: United Kingdom
- Manufacturer: Auster Aircraft Limited
- Number built: 1

History
- First flight: 1957
- Developed from: Auster J/5T

The Auster C6 Atlantic was a British four-seat cabin monoplane designed and built by Auster Aircraft Limited. Development of the type was abandoned after initial flight tests.

== Design and development ==
The C6 Atlantic was designed as a high-wing monoplane, four-seat executive tourer, powered by a 185 hp (138 kW) Continental E-185-10 piston engine and based on the Auster J/5T with a tricycle landing gear and other modern items such as control wheels. One aircraft was built which, as a fitted out fuselage registered G-APHT, was statically displayed at the 1957 SBAC Show at Farnborough. Subsequently a pair of Autocrat wings were fitted and early flight tests were encouraging. However, these flights were curtailed by a nose leg collapse due to an inferior nosewheel strut which had been fitted only for the static display and not replaced with the correct item before the first flight.

Although the airframe was repaired and modified, the directors considered the future of the Atlantic at length. An estimate was prepared of the projected development costs and this totalled in excess of £100,000, so that the break-even point required the sale of 300 aircraft. Since maximum sales were envisaged as probably 100 at the most, and with no outside financial help, development was reluctantly abandoned. The sole aircraft was stored until being brought out of storage in 1960 for comparison with the proposed Auster D.8; since production of the C.6 would have required the manufacture of new jigs, the D.8 was pursued instead, ultimately becoming the Beagle Airedale.

== Specifications ==
Data from

General characteristics

- Crew: 1
- Capacity: 3
- Length: 23 ft 10 in (7.27 m)
- Wingspan: 36 ft 0 in (10.98 m)
- Gross weight: 2,700 lb (1,225 kg)
- Powerplant: 1 × Continental E-185-10 , 185 hp (138 kW)

Performance

- Cruise speed: 127 mph (204 km/h, 110 kn)
