= Auster Aircraft =

British aircraft manufacturer (1938–1960)

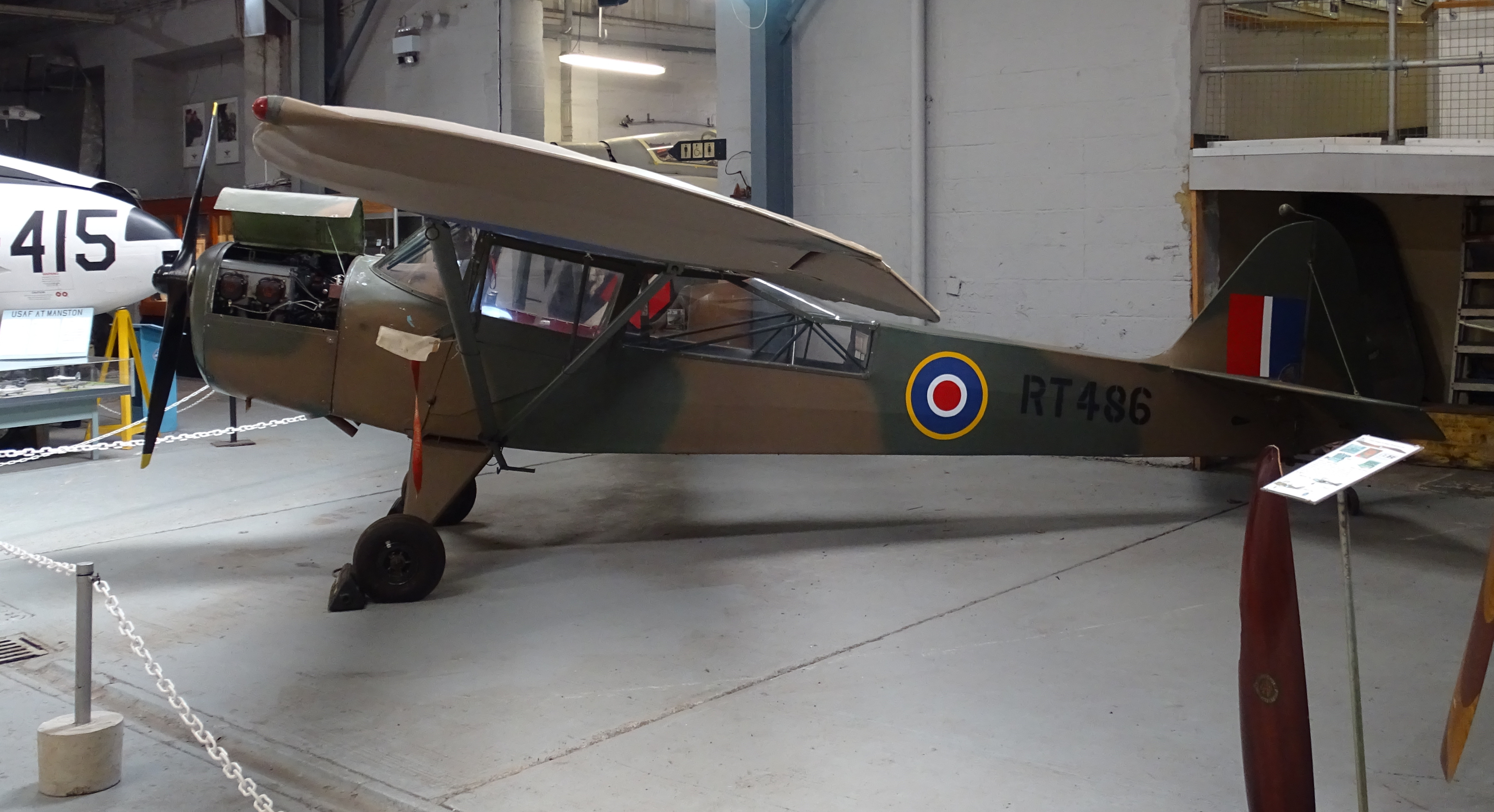
- Industry: Aerospace
- Founded: 1938 (as Taylorcraft Aeroplanes (England) Limited)
- Defunct: 1960
- Fate: Merged with Beagle Aircraft.
- Headquarters: Rearsby, Leicestershire, UK

Auster Aircraft Limited was a British aircraft manufacturer from 1938 to 1961.

== History ==
The company began in 1938 at the Britannia Works, Thurmaston near Leicester, England, as Taylorcraft Aeroplanes (England) Limited, making light observation aircraft designed by the Taylorcraft Aircraft Corporation of America. 1,604 high-wing Taylorcraft Auster monoplanes were built during World War II for the armed forces of the UK and Canada, primarily for the role of air observation post (AOP).

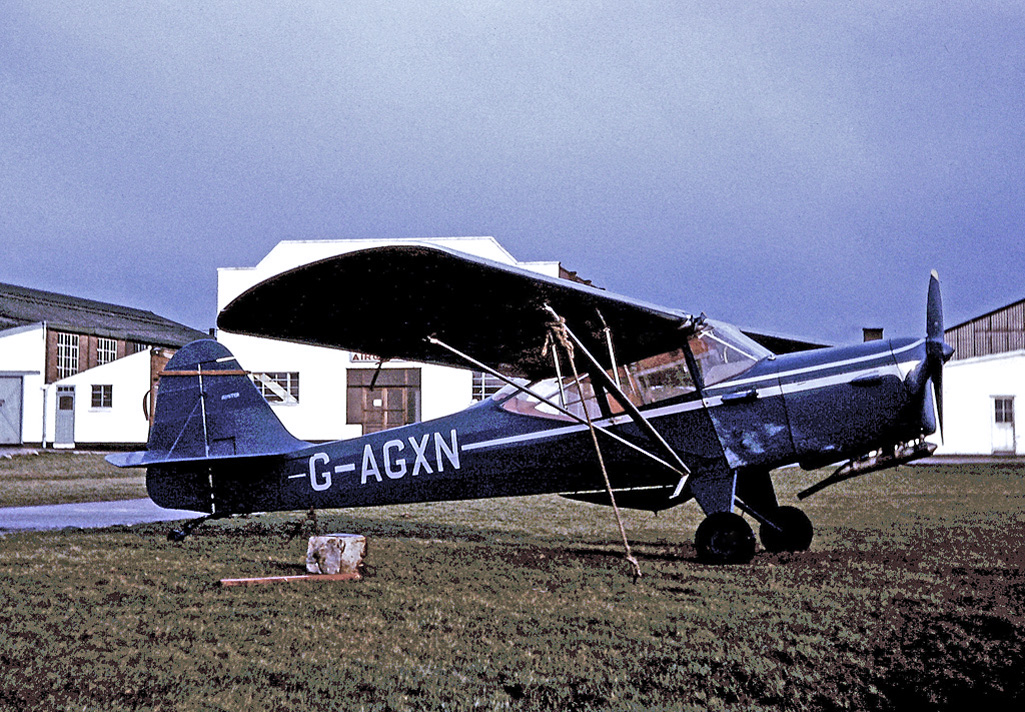
Auster Alpha parked in front of Auster's original assembly facilities at Rearsby in 1966

During the war the head office and drawing office were at a big old house on the outskirts of Thurmaston called "The Woodlands". The fuselages and wings were manufactured at Syston under the works manager by the name of Sharp. Sheet metalwork was done at the old 'en tout cas' works at Thurmaston. Final assembly, fitting out and testing took place at Rearsby aerodrome. The name changed to Auster (after the Roman name for the south wind) on 7 March 1946, when production shifted to Rearsby aerodrome, all in Leicestershire. All designs were evolved from the early Taylorcraft with a sprung skid or tailwheel beneath the fin (except for a low-wing aircraft called the "Agricola" designed for aerial farming work; only nine of these were completed). When the company was merged into Beagle Aircraft in June, 1961, the high-wing design was developed still further as the Terrier and, with a nosewheel, the Airedale.

The Auster name was dropped in 1962 after Beagle Aircraft was created.

== Aircraft ==
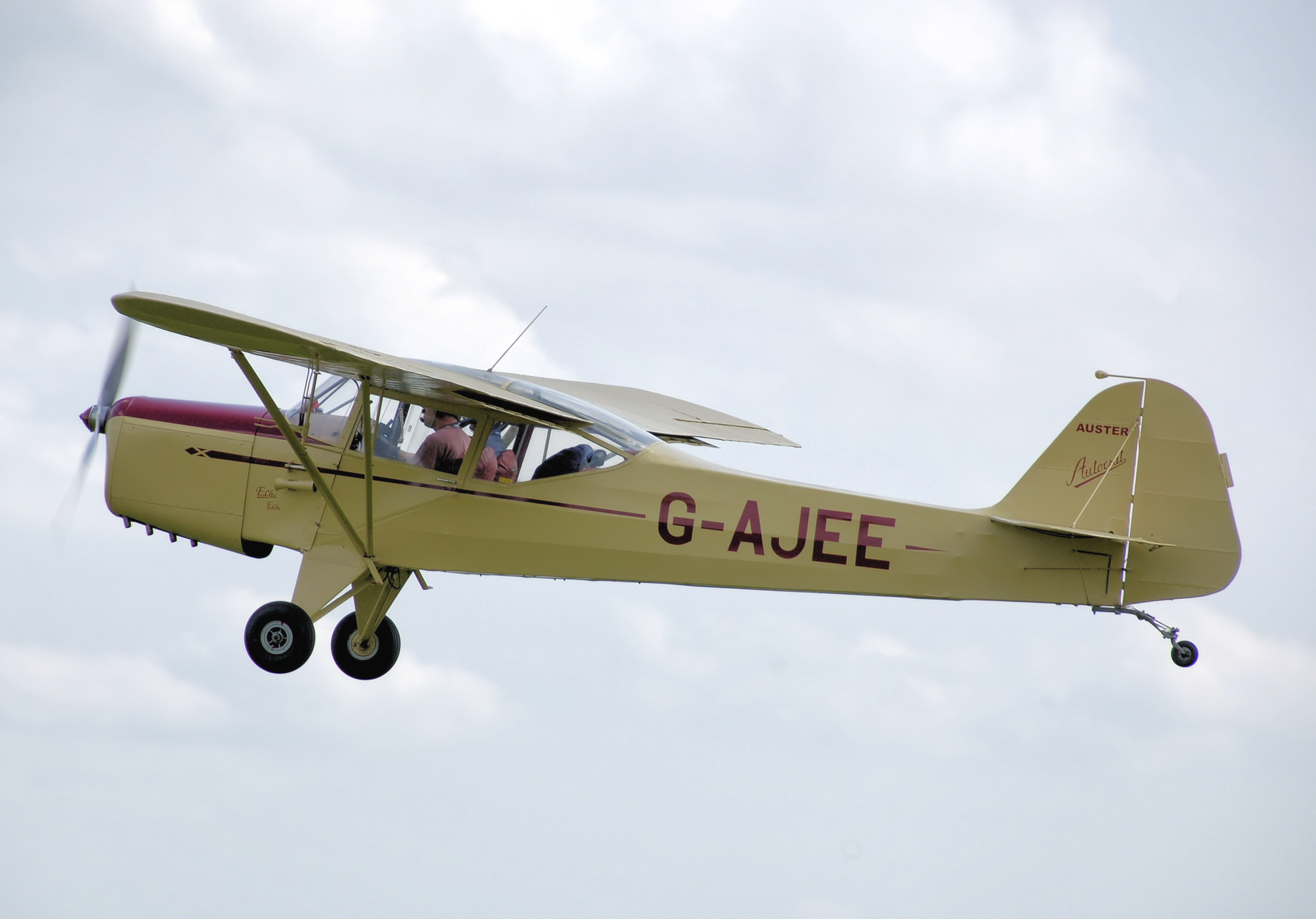
Auster Autocrat 5J1, built 1946

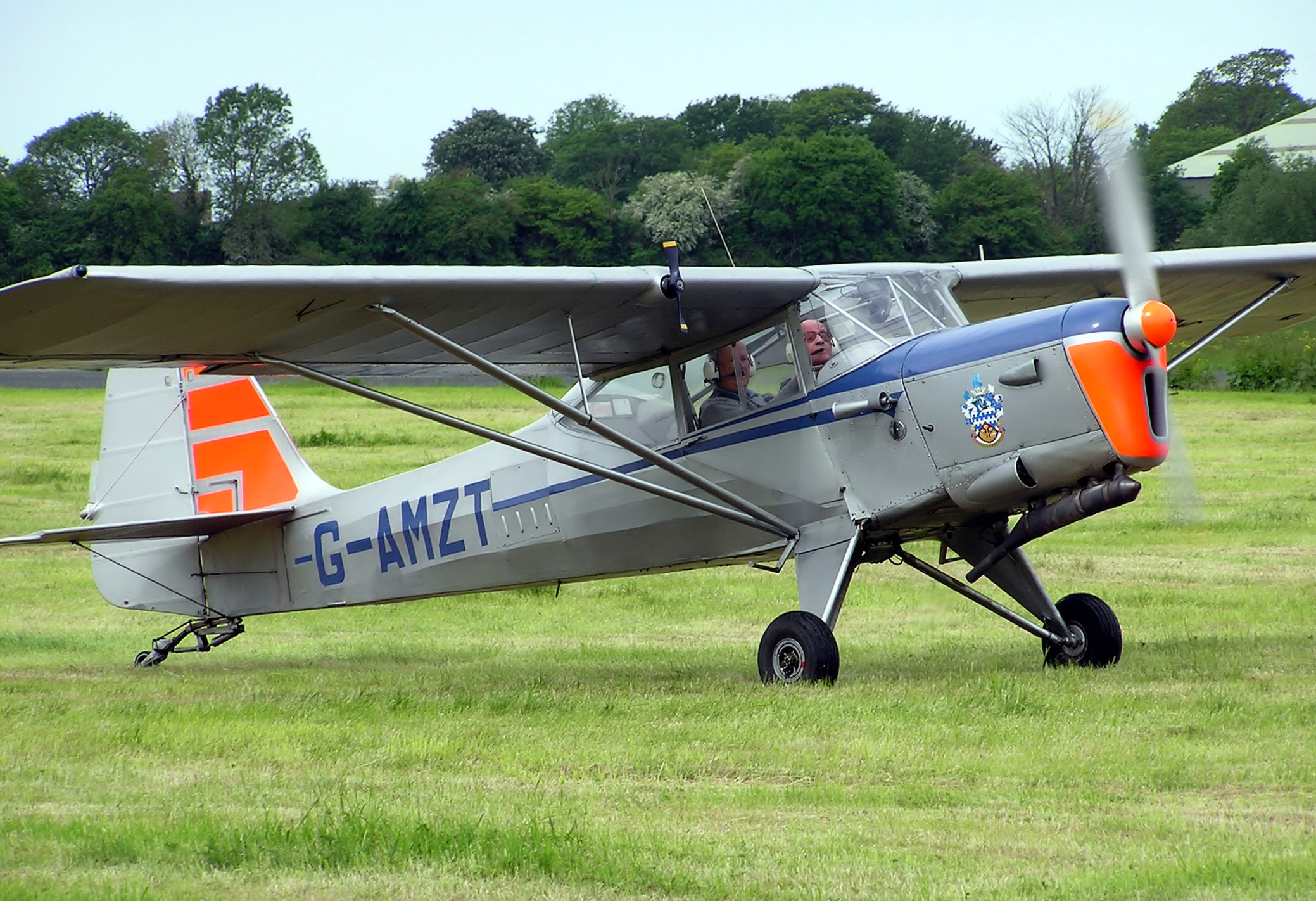
Auster J/5F Aiglet Trainer of 1953

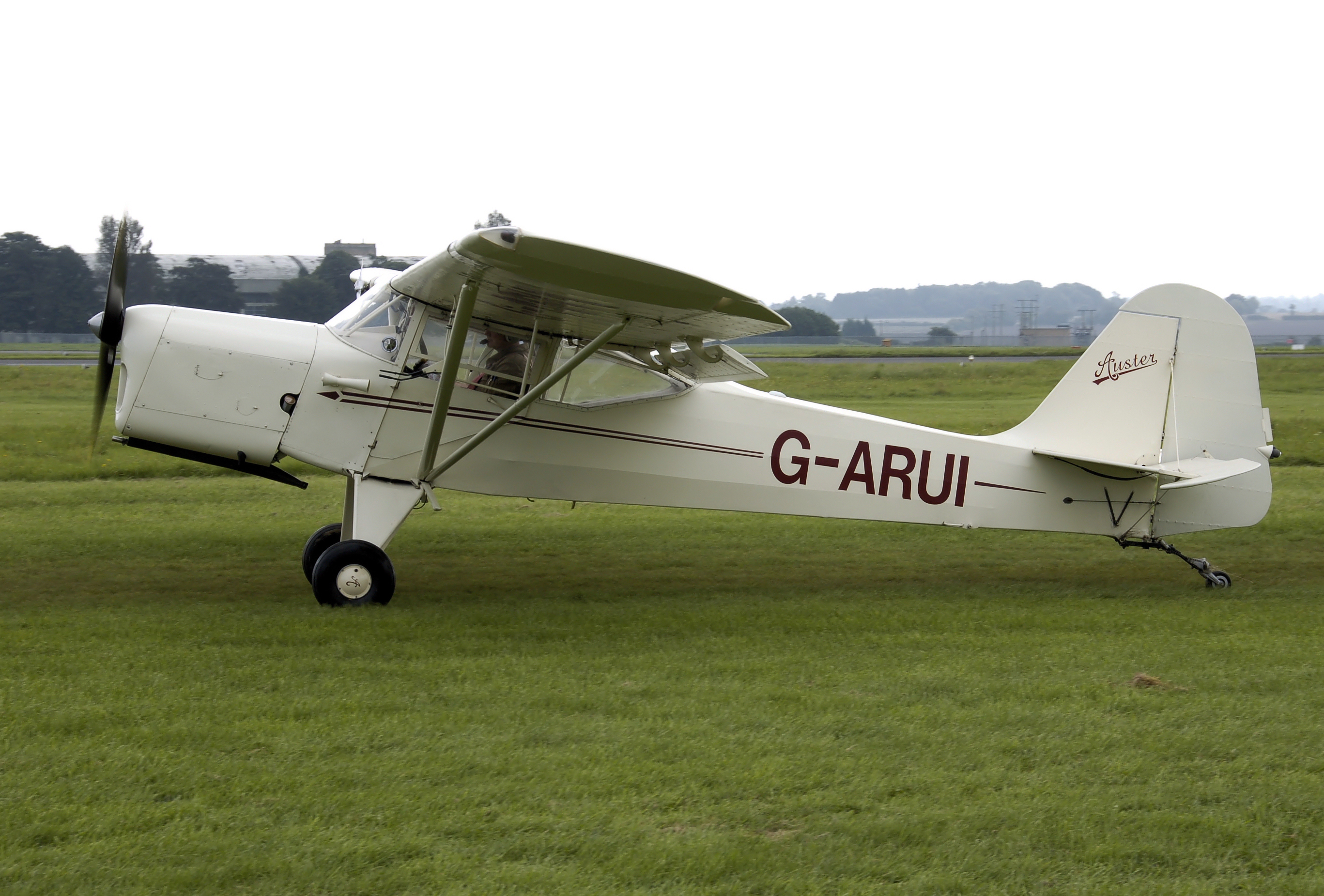
Beagle A.61 Terrier of 1962

- Taylorcraft Plus C – licence-built Taylorcraft B
- Taylorcraft Plus D – re-engined Plus C.
- Model D/1 – Auster I – military version of Plus C with enlarged windows.
- Model E – Auster III – re-engined Auster I with split flaps Gipsy Major 1 engine
- Model F – Auster II – re-engined Auster I Lycoming 0-290-3 engine
- Model G – Auster IV – Modified fuselage with extended rear cabin glazing and Lycoming 0-290-3 engine
- Model H – Experimental tandem two-seat training glider converted from Taylorcraft B.
- Model J – Auster V – As Auster IV with blind-flying instruments and Vacuum System Lycoming 0-290-3/1 engine
- Auster J family
  - Mk 5 – Civil conversion of Auster V with Lycoming 0-290-3(C) engines
  - Mk 5 Alpha – new-build Auster Mk5 aircraft with Lycoming 0-290-3(C) engines
  - Mk5-150 – Conversion of Civil Auster V with Lycoming 0-320 engine
  - J/1 Autocrat – three-seat high-winged monoplane light aircraft (fitted with Blackburn Cirrus Minor II engine)
  - Auster J/1A Autocrat – four-seat version of Autocrat
  - Auster J/1B Aiglet – re-engined agricultural version of Autocrat ([De Havilland Gipsy Major1] engine)
  - Auster J/1N – Conversion of Auster J/1 Autocrat from Cirrus MinorII engine to Gipsy Major1 engine.
  - Auster J/1N Alpha – NEW built Auster J/1N aircraft (De Havilland Gipsy Major1 engine)
  - Auster J/1S Autocrat – Conversion to De-Havilland Gipsy Major10 Mk2 engine.
  - J/1U Workmaster – agricultural version of the Alpha Lycoming 0-360 engine
  - Auster J/1Y – Conversion of Auster J/1 Series to Lycoming 0-320 Engine Predecessor of Auster D5/160 Auster D5
- J/2 Arrow
- J/3 Atom – low-powered version of Arrow with Continental engine
- J/4 – Arrow with Blackburn Cirrus Minor I engine Predecessor of Auster D4/108
- J/5 Adventurer – three-seat high-wing monoplane light aircraft
  - Auster J/5 Adventurer
  - Auster J/5A Adventurer
- J/5 Autocar
  - Auster J/5B Autocar – four-seat high-winged monoplane light aircraft
  - Auster J/5E Autocar
  - Auster J/5G Autocar
  - Auster J/5P Autocar
  - Auster J/5T Autocar – one only built
  - Auster J/5V Autocar
- J/5 Aiglet Trainer – aerobatic version 32 ft wingspan
  - Auster J/5F Aiglet Trainer
  - Auster J/5K Aiglet Trainer
  - Auster J/5L Aiglet Trainer
  - Auster J/8L Aiglet Trainer
- J/5 Alpine – improved Aiglet Trainer with 36 ft wingspan
  - Auster J/5R Alpine
  - Auster J/5Q Alpine
- Model K – Auster AOP6 – post-war military Air Observation aircraft.
  - Auster 6A Tugmaster – glider towing conversion of the Auster 6
  - Auster 6B / Beagle Terrier – civil conversion of the Auster 6
- Model L – proposed two or three seat low-wing monoplane based on the Model G airframe with a Lycoming O-290-3 engine, not built.

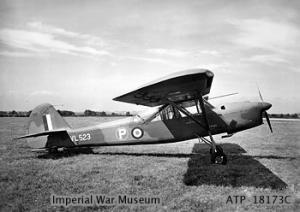
The Auster A.2/45 second prototype, VL523, of 1949

- Model M – Auster A.2/45 – 2 or 3-seat high-wing AOP aircraft, prototype only.
- Model N – Auster A.2/45 – re-engined Model M, prototype only.
- Model P – Auster Avis – four-seater based on J/1 with slimmer fuselage, two built.
- Model Q – Auster T7 – two-seat trainer version of AOP6.
- Model S – AOP aircraft based on AOP6 with enlarged tail, prototype only.
- Model A3 – two-seat light aircraft project with a Blackburn Cirrus Minor engine, not built.
- Model A4 – two-seat development project of current (1948) designs with a Blackburn Cirrus Minor 2 engine, not built.
- Model A5 – four-seat army co-operation project with a De Havilland Gipsy Major 10 engine, two version planned a conventional landing gear for air ambulance work and a tricycle landing gear version for communications and reconnaissance work, not built.
- Model A6 – variant of the A4 with a Cirrus Minor engine driving a geared ducted fan, not built.
- Model A7 – light twin project, not built.
- Model A8 – three-seat AOP project with a Bombardier engine, not built.
- Model A9 – Project to meet a Royal Air Force requirement for a two-seat training aircraft, the Percival Provost was selected and the A9 was not built.
- Model B1 – mid-wing AOP project, not built.
- Model B3 – radio-controlled target drone.
- Model B4 – Auster B4 – four-seat high-winged ambulance aircraft
- Model B5 – Auster AOP9 – 1950s military air observation aircraft
- Model B6 – parasol-wing agricultural project with bubble canopy, not built.
- Model B8 – Auster B8 Agricola – low-winged agricultural aircraft
- Model B9 – ramjet helicopter project, not built
- Model C4 – Auster Antarctic – modified Auster T7 for Antarctic support.
- Model C6 – Auster Atlantic – four-seat high-wing touring monoplane with tricycle undercarriage, one built.
- Model D4 – Auster D4 – two-seat development of the Auster Arrow.
- Model D5 – Auster D5 – re-engined version of Auster Alpha with modified tail, developed as the Beagle Husky
- Model D6 – Auster D6 – four-seat development of Auster Autocar
- Model D8 – original designation of Beagle Airedale.
- Model E3 – AOP9 with modified engine as the AOP11.

== See also ==
- Aerospace industry in the United Kingdom

Related development

- Taylorcraft B

Aircraft of comparable role, configuration, and era

- Aeronca Champion
- Aeronca L-3
- Fieseler Fi 156 Storch
- Levente II
- Piper J-3 Cub
