= Auster Adventurer =

1940s British light aircraft

Auster J/5 Adventurer
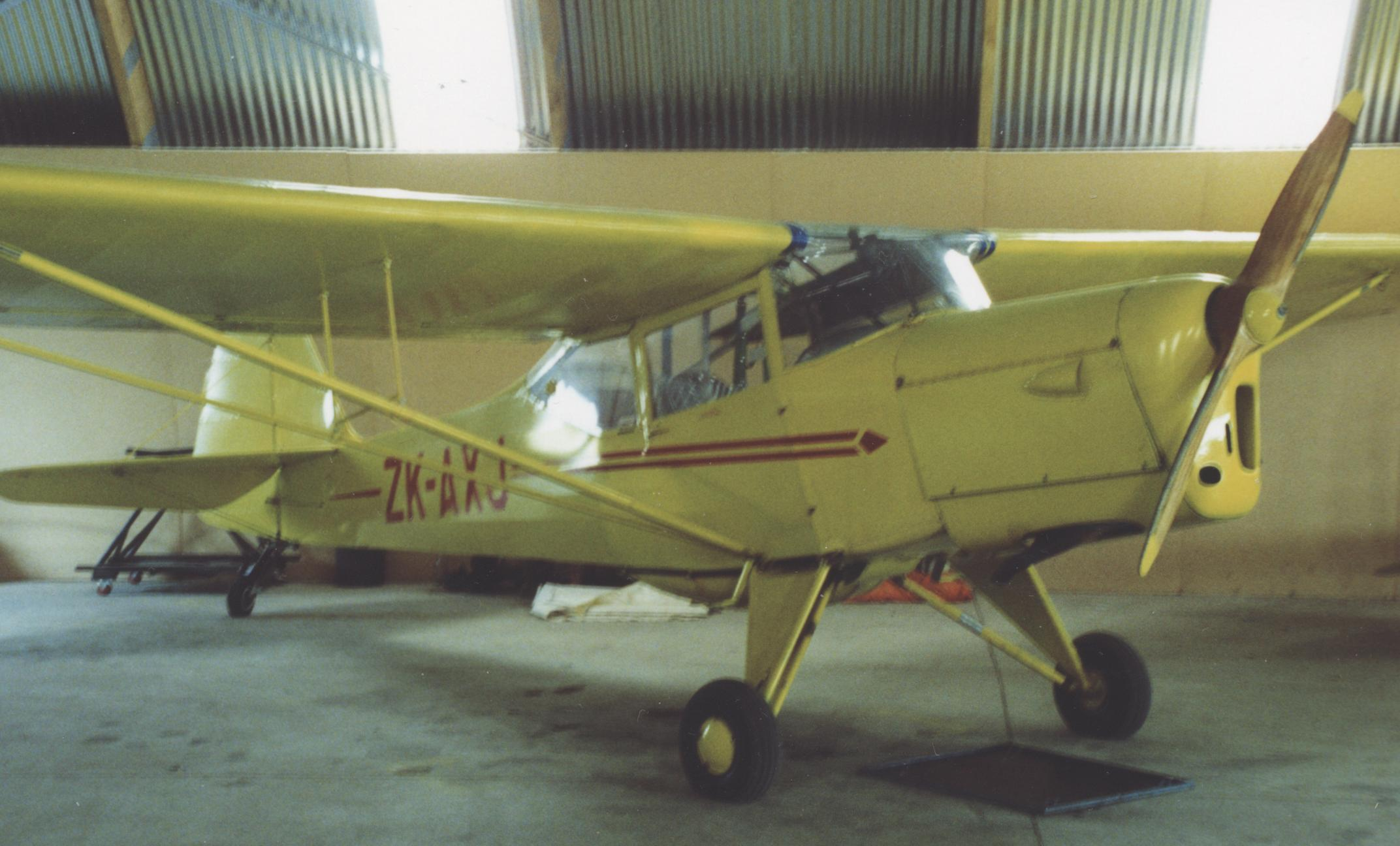
- J/5 Adventurer at Ardmore airfield, Auckland, New Zealand in February 1992

General information
- Type: private owner aircraft
- National origin: United Kingdom
- Manufacturer: Auster Aircraft Ltd
- Status: several still in operation
- Primary user: private owner pilots and agricultural contractors
- Number built: 59

History
- Introduction date: 1948
- First flight: 15 November 1947
- Developed from: J/1 Autocrat

The Auster J/5 Adventurer is a British-built three-seat light high-wing monoplane of the late 1940s.

== Development ==
The Adventurer three-seat high-wing monoplane was developed from the J/1 Autocrat with extra power provided by the installation of the 130 h.p. Gipsy Major engine, to enable more flexible operations in the hotter climate of Australia and New Zealand, where most examples were sold. Unlike the similarly powered J/1 Aiglet and J/1N Alpha, the Adventurer retained the smaller tail surfaces of the Autocrat, the new engine being set back sufficiently far for the original fin area to remain sufficient.

The prototype Adventurer was converted to the new standard from a J/1 Autocrat c/n 2093 and first flew on 15 November 1947. This was followed by a further 58 production examples delivered between 1948 and 1952.

== Operational history ==
Most J/5s were sold to private pilot owners in Australia and New Zealand where they were given the name Adventurer. Eleven Adventurers were still in service in Australia in 2009 and one in New Zealand (see image). Six Adventurers were sold to the Royal New Zealand Air Force (RNZAF) and four to the Royal Rhodesian Air Force (RRAF). Five examples were completed for agricultural use as the J/5A Cropduster and served in Africa and Pakistan.

== Variants ==
J/5
civil version, also operated by the RNZAF and RRAF (54 aircraft)
J/5A
agricultural version with spray bars, spray tank etc. (5 aircraft)

== Operators ==
New Zealand

- Royal New Zealand Air Force operated six J/5 Aiglets.

Southern Rhodesia

- Southern Rhodesian Air Force operated four.

== Specifications (J/5) ==
Data from Green, 1965, p. 138

General characteristics

- Crew: one
- Capacity: two passengers
- Length: 23 ft 6 in (7.16 m)
- Wingspan: 36 ft 0 in (10.97 m)
- Height: 6 ft 6 in (1.98 m)
- Wing area: 185 sq ft (17.19 m^{2})
- Empty weight: 1,205 lb (547 kg)
- Gross weight: 2,000 lb (907 kg)
- Powerplant: 1 × de Havilland Gipsy Major I , 130 hp (97 kW)

Performance

- Maximum speed: 125 mph (201 km/h, 109 kn)
- Cruise speed: 106 mph (171 km/h, 92 kn)
- Range: 200 mi (322 km, 170 nmi)
- Rate of climb: 750 ft/min (3.81 m/s)
