= Auster J/4 =

1940s British monoplane

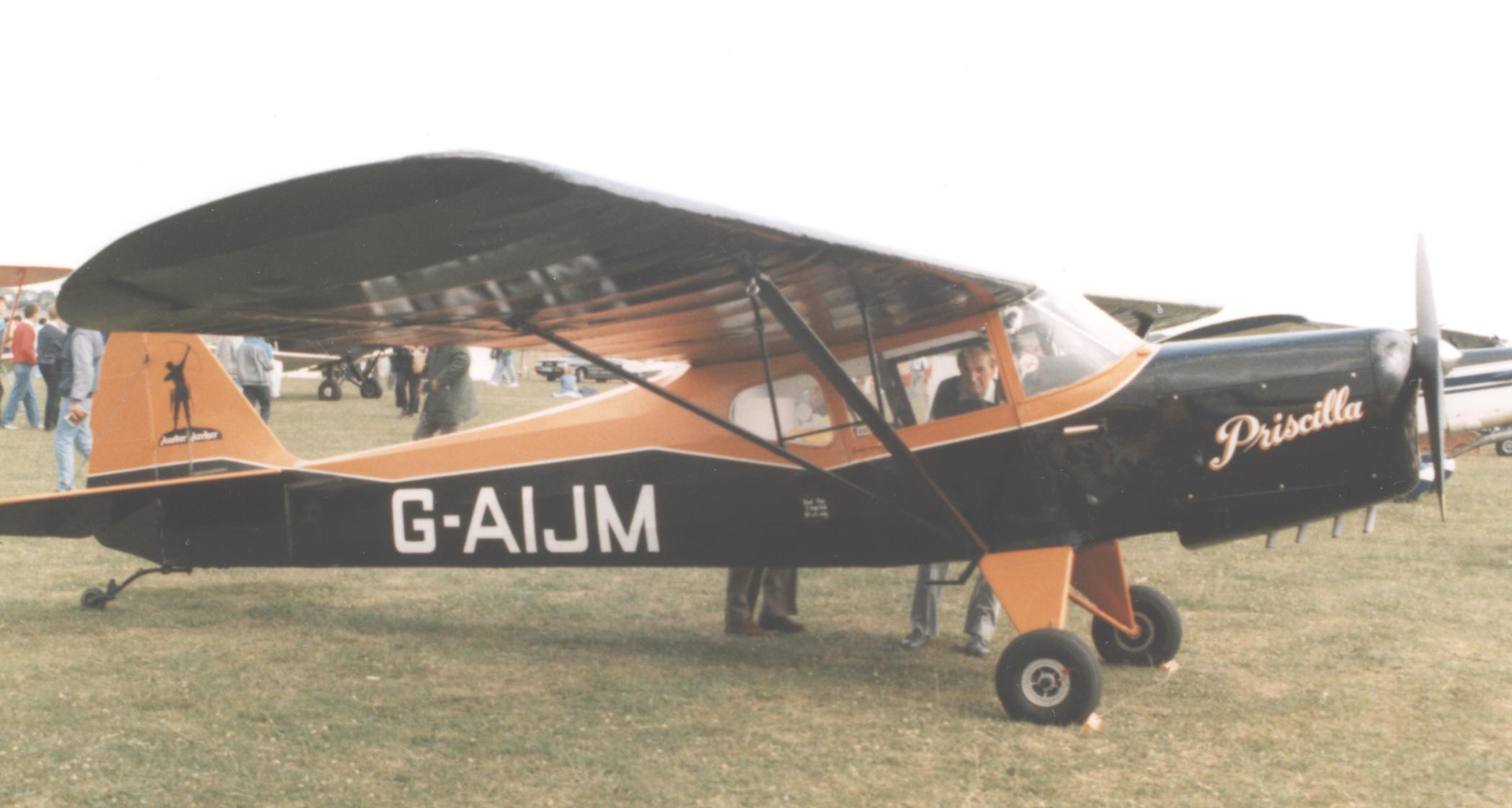
- Auster J/4 at PFA Rally held at Cranfield, Bedfordshire, in July 1989

General information
- Type: Touring aircraft
- Manufacturer: Auster Aircraft Limited
- Number built: 27

History
- First flight: 1946
- Developed from: Auster J/2 Arrow

The Auster J/4 was a 1940s British single-engined two-seat high-wing touring monoplane built by Auster Aircraft Limited at Rearsby, Leicestershire.

== History ==
Sales in the United Kingdom of the American-engined Auster J/2 Arrow were limited by import restrictions on the engines, so Auster re-engined the aircraft with a British engine, the 90 hp Blackburn Cirrus Minor I. The first aircraft flew towards the end of 1946. The two-seat aircraft proved less popular than the companies three-seat Auster J/1 Autocrat and only 27 aircraft were built. A number of aircraft were exported to Australia and these were known as the Archer in that country.

Two J4 airframes (G-AIPH & G-AIJT) were modified with Continental O-200 engines in the late 1960s by the Rolls-Royce employees “Merlin Flying Club”. G-AIJT remains airworthy.

On 30 August 1955 an Australian aircraft VH-AET managed to take-off from Bankstown Airport Sydney without a pilot. It was followed out to sea by Royal Australian Navy Hawker Sea Furies and shot down.

== Specifications (J/4) ==
Data from Jane's all the World's Aircraft 1949-50, The Incomplete Guide to Airfoil Usage, British Civil Aircraft since 1919 Volume I

General characteristics

- Crew: 2
- Length: 22 ft 6 in (6.86 m)
- Wingspan: 36 ft 1 in (11.0 m)
- Height: 6 ft 6 in (1.98 m) tail down, propeller horizontal
- Wing area: 185 sq ft (17.2 m^{2})
- Aspect ratio: 6.857
- Airfoil: NACA 23012
- Empty weight: 955 lb (433 kg)
- Gross weight: 1,600 lb (726 kg)
- Fuel capacity: Fuel:15 imp gal (18 US gal; 68 L) in fuselage fuel tank, with 13.75 imp gal (16.51 US gal; 62.5 L) under-fuselage auxiliary tank; Oil:2 imp gal (2.4 US gal; 9.1 L) aft of engine.
- Powerplant: 1 × Blackburn Cirrus Minor I 4-cylinder inverted air-cooled in-line piston engine, 90 hp (67 kW) maximum at 2,600rpm
- Propellers: 2-bladed Weybridge wooden fixed pitch propeller

Performance

- Maximum speed: 108 mph (174 km/h, 94 kn)
- Cruise speed: 92 mph (148 km/h, 80 kn) at 2,300 rpm
- Stall speed: 37 mph (60 km/h, 32 kn)
- Range: 317 mi (510 km, 275 nmi) in still air
- Service ceiling: 12,500 ft (3,800 m)
- Rate of climb: 746 ft/min (3.79 m/s)
- Wing loading: 8.65 lb/sq ft (42.2 kg/m^{2})
- Fuel consumption: 0.3234 lb/mi (0.0912 kg/km)
- Power/mass: 17.1 lb/hp (10.4 kg/kW)
- Take-off run: 150 yd (140 m) in 5 mph (4.3 kn; 8.0 km/h) wind
- Landing run: 80 yd (73 m) in 5 mph (4.3 kn; 8.0 km/h) wind

== See also ==
Related lists

- List of civil aircraft
