= Auster Atom =

1940s British light aircraft

J/3 Atom

General information
- Type: Touring aircraft
- Manufacturer: Auster Aircraft Limited
- Number built: 1

History
- First flight: 1946
- Developed from: J/2 Arrow

The Auster J/3 Atom was a 1940s British single-engined two-seat high-wing touring monoplane built by Auster Aircraft Limited at Rearsby, Leicestershire.

== History ==
The Atom was an attempt to create a lower-powered version of the J-2 Arrow. A modified Arrow was flown with a 65 hp Continental A65-12 engine and designated the J/3 Atom. Only the prototype, registered G-AHSY, (c/n 2250) was built as the aircraft was not developed further. Another example G-AJIJ (c/n 2401) was not completed.

The sole J/3 was dismantled at Rearsby in 1950 and was rebuilt to J/4 standard with a new registration G-AJYX and c/n 2941. It crashed near Melton Mowbray on 22 April 1951 after a pilotless take-off from Rearsby. The Continental A65 engine had been replaced by a 95 hp Blackburn Cirrus Minor II. This aircraft has since been deregistered by the CAA.

== Specifications (J-3) ==
General characteristics

- Crew: 1
- Capacity: up to two passengers
- Length: 25 ft 3 in (7.70 m)
- Wingspan: 36 ft (11 m)
- Height: 6 ft 6 in (1.98 m)
- Wing area: 185 sq ft (17.2 m^{2})
- Max takeoff weight: 1,601 lb (726 kg)
- Powerplant: 1 × Continental A65 4-cyl. horizontally opposed air-cooled piston engine at 2350 rpm

Performance
