= Auster J/1B Aiglet =

British light aircraft

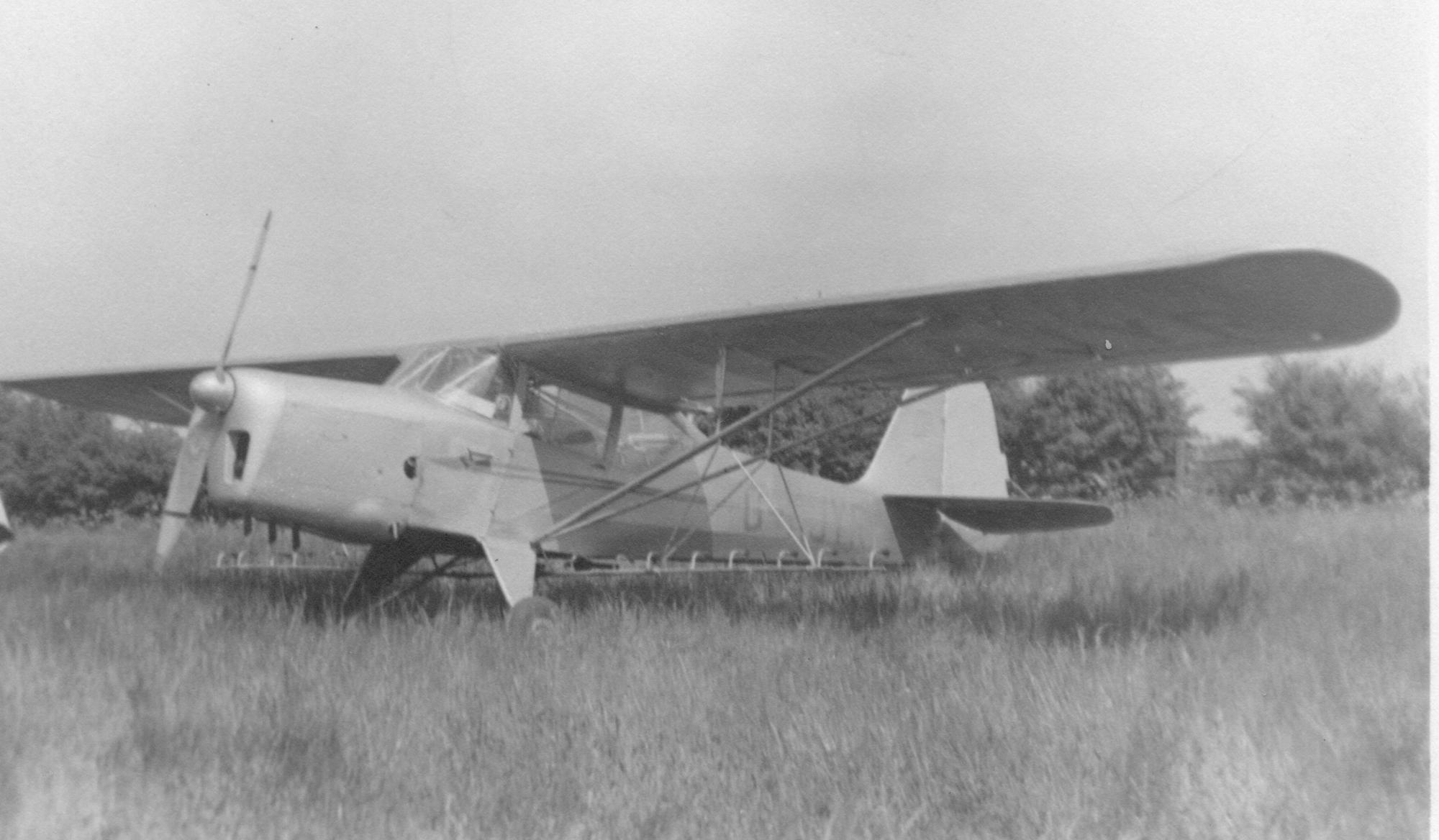
- J/1B Aiglet fitted with under-wing crop-spraying bars at Rearsby airfield, Leicestershire, in June 1951.

General information
- Type: light civil aircraft
- National origin: United Kingdom
- Manufacturer: Auster Aircraft
- Primary user: agricultural contractors and private owners
- Number built: 86

History
- First flight: 1950
- Retired: several still airworthy in Australia, New Zealand and the U.K.
- Developed from: Auster J/1 Autocrat

The Auster J/1B Aiglet is a British light civil utility aircraft developed in the 1950s.

== Development ==
The Auster J/1 Autocrat of 1946 had achieved considerable sales success but orders died away in the late 1940s. Few sales were achieved in the important Australian market as the Autocrat's 100 h.p. engine was not powerful enough for the harsher summer conditions experienced there.

In 1950, Auster Aircraft utilised an uncompleted Autocrat airframe and wing structure and incorporated a larger fin and rudder to compensate for the installation of a 130 h.p. de Havilland Gipsy Major engine which had been modified by the fitment of double scavenge pumps to match the cooling system.

The prototype first flew in 1950 and was followed by several other conversions of Autocrat airframes, but construction soon switched to the use of new airframes. Most sales were made in Australia and New Zealand. The majority of aircraft were exported engineless to Kingsford Smith Aviation Services in Sydney where they were completed and tested before delivery.

== Operational history ==
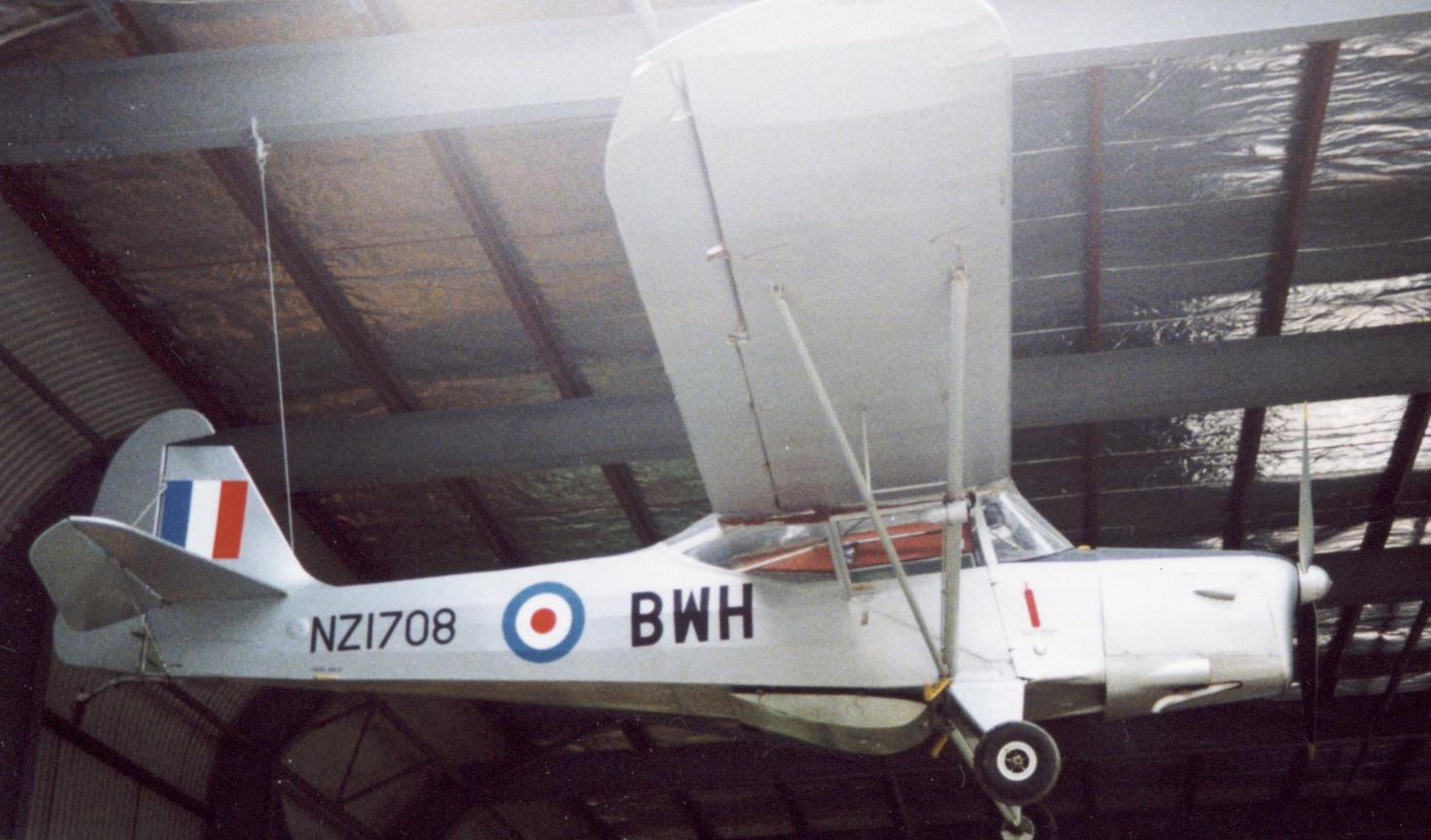
J/1B Aiglet exhibited at MOTAT Auckland New Zealand in February 1992 wearing RNZAF style markings

The Aiglet was particularly suited to use by agricultural spraying and dusting contractors. The spray bars were installed using supports on the Aiglet's fuselage undersurfaces and the wing struts. Most sales were to Australia and New Zealand but seven were supplied to Aerial Spraying Contractors Ltd of Boston, Lincolnshire. These were flown out to Sudan in autumn 1950 and within a month had rid 17,000 acres (69 km^{2}) of farmland of locusts and other insect pests.

The agricultural task required operation at very low heights in conditions of extreme heat and inevitably resulted in the loss of many Aiglets in accidents. After withdrawal from crop-spraying use during the late 1950s and early 1960s, the survivors were purchased by aerial photo contractors, aero clubs and private owners. Many of these aircraft were fitted with an extra fuel tank beneath the fuselage, as shown in the adjacent photograph.

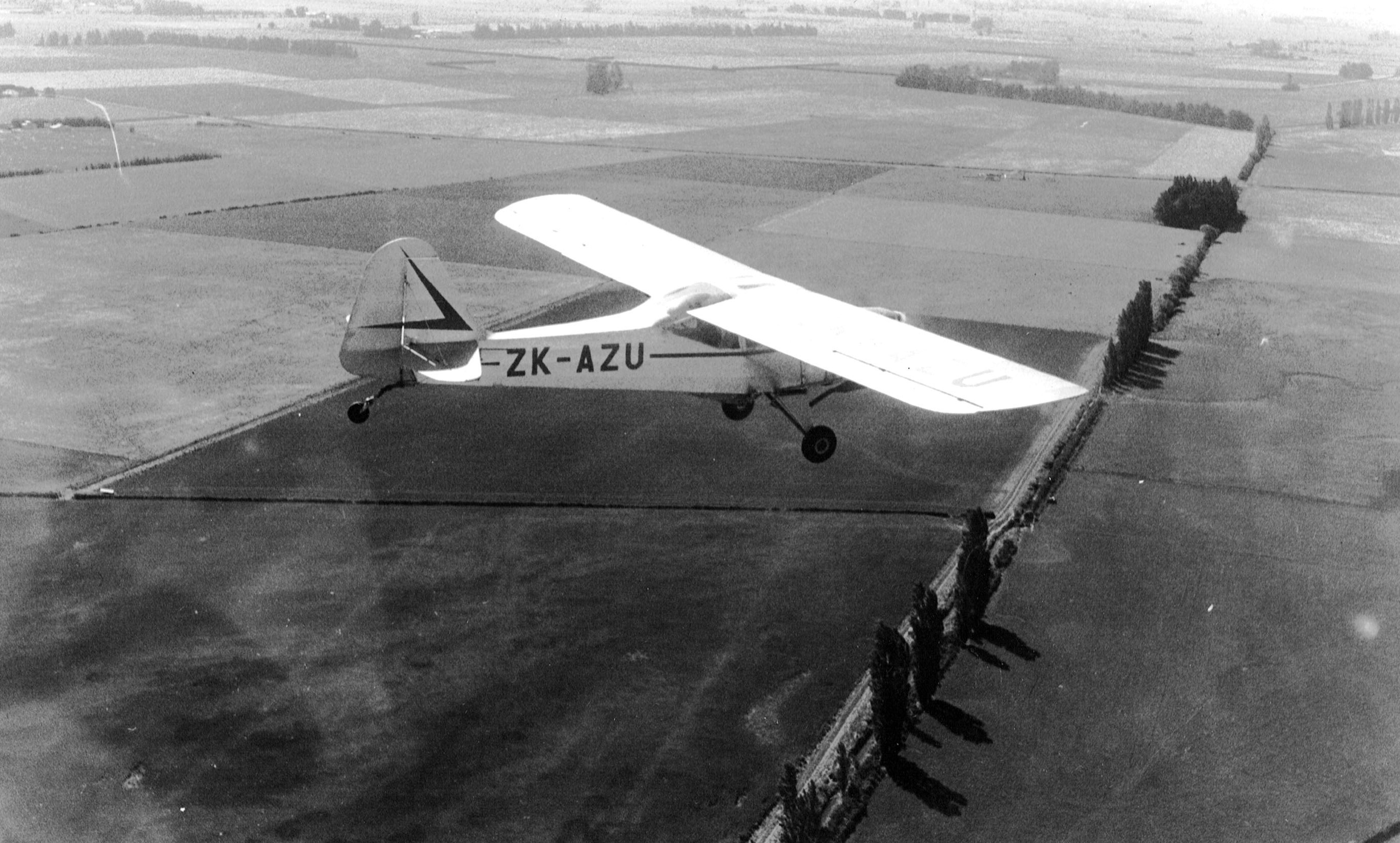
Auster J1B

In 2009, several Aiglets remain in airworthy condition in Australia and New Zealand and three were active in the United Kingdom.

== Specifications (J/1B) ==
Data from

General characteristics

- Crew: 1
- Capacity: agricultural materials or two passengers
- Length: 23 ft 8 in (7.21 m)
- Wingspan: 36 ft 0 in (10.97 m)
- Height: 6 ft 6 in (1.98 m)
- Wing area: 185 sq ft (17.2 m^{2})
- Powerplant: 1 × de Havilland Gipsy Major 1 four-cylinder inverted air-cooled in-line, 130 hp (97 kW)

Performance

- Maximum speed: 126 mph (203 km/h, 109 kn)
- Cruise speed: 105 mph (169 km/h, 91 kn)
- Range: 220 mi (350 km, 190 nmi)
- Service ceiling: 18,000 ft (5,500 m)
- Rate of climb: 900 ft/min (4.6 m/s)
