= Auster Arrow =

1940s British light aircraft

J/2 Arrow
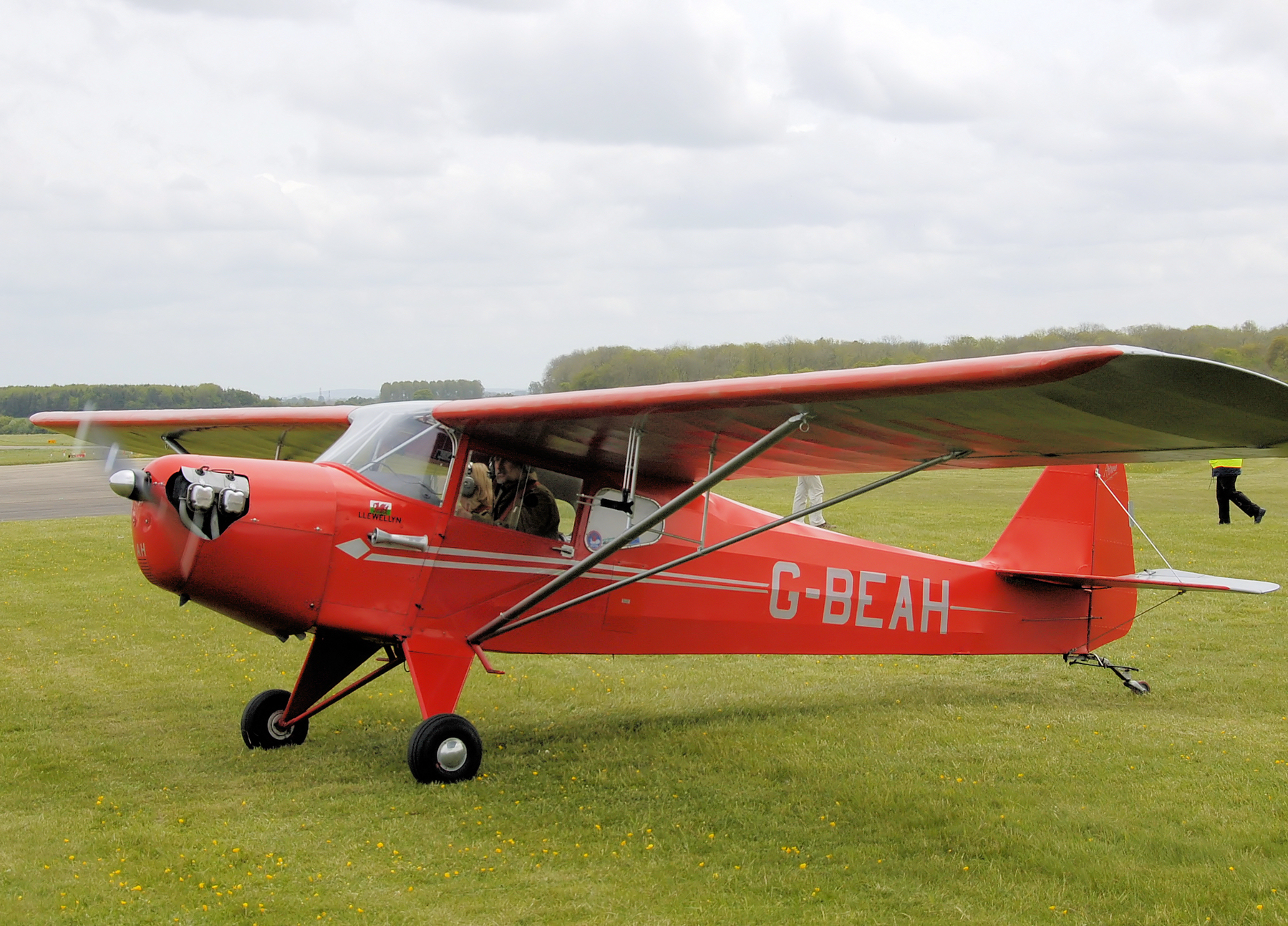

General information
- Type: Touring aircraft
- Manufacturer: Auster Aircraft Limited
- Status: Two airworthy in UK in 2009
- Primary user: Private pilot owners
- Number built: 44

History
- Introduction date: 1945
- First flight: 1945
- Variants: Auster Atom; Auster J-4

The Auster J/2 Arrow is a 1940s British single-engined two-seat high-wing touring monoplane built by Auster Aircraft Limited at Rearsby, Leicestershire, England.

== History ==
The Arrow was designed as a successor to the pre-war Taylorcraft Plus C monoplane. A development aircraft, a side-by-side two-seater first flew in 1946 powered by a Lycoming O-145-B3 flat four air-cooled engine.

Import restrictions on the sale in the United Kingdom (UK) of American-built engines resulted in most of the 44 aircraft completed being exported, mainly to Australia. In later life, examples were re-imported to the UK, where several examples remained active in 2011.

== Specifications (J/2) ==
Data from Jane's All the World's Aircraft 1951–52

General characteristics

- Crew: 1
- Capacity: 1 passenger
- Length: 22 ft 9 in (6.93 m)
- Wingspan: 36 ft 0 in (10.97 m)
- Height: 6 ft 6 in (1.98 m) (tail down, propeller horizontal)
- Wing area: 185 sq ft (17.2 m^{2})
- Empty weight: 872 lb (396 kg)
- Gross weight: 1,450 lb (658 kg)
- Powerplant: 1 × Continental C75-12 air-cooled flat-four, 75 hp (56 kW)

Performance

- Maximum speed: 98 mph (158 km/h, 85 kn)
- Cruise speed: 87 mph (140 km/h, 76 kn)
- Stall speed: 35 mph (56 km/h, 30 kn)
- Range: 320 mi (510 km, 280 nmi)
- Service ceiling: 10,000 ft (3,000 m)
- Rate of climb: 430 ft/min (2.2 m/s)

== See also ==
Aircraft of comparable role, configuration, and era

- Aeronca Champion
- Fleet Canuck
- Piper J-3
- Taylorcraft L-2

Related lists

- List of civil aircraft
