= Beagle Husky =

Type of aircraft

Auster D.5 series
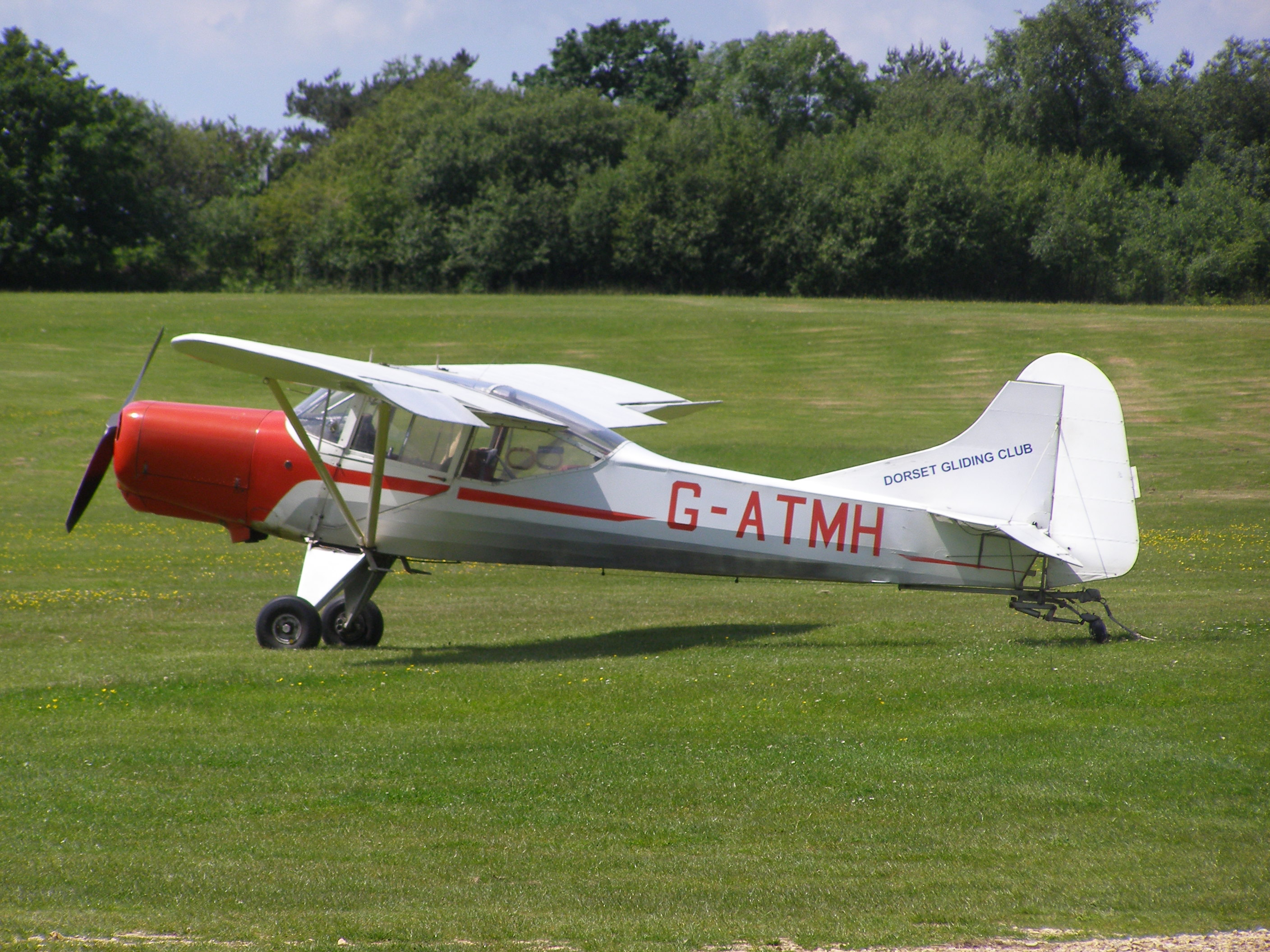

General information
- Type: Utility aircraft
- Manufacturer: Auster, Beagle Aircraft, OGMA
- Number built: 179

History
- First flight: 10 January 1960
- Developed from: Auster Alpha

The Beagle Husky (originally, the Auster D.5 and initially designated the Auster J/1Y) was a three-seat British light aircraft built in the 1960s which originated from a Portuguese Air Force requirement for a liaison/training aircraft, a development of the Auster Alpha. It first flew as an Auster design in January 1960, but that company was taken over by Beagle Aircraft in September that year. It was initially available with a 160 hp Lycoming O-320 engine as the Auster D5/160.

Twenty-two D5/160 were built for Portugal by Auster Aircraft at their Rearsby, Leicestershire, factory, in addition to a single D5/180 (the first such aircraft, with a 180 hp Lycoming O-360 engine). 141 sets of components for D5/160s were built by Auster and shipped to Portugal from Rearsby for assembly by the Oficinas Gerais de Material Aeronautico OGMA under licence, and 5 modification kits to bring a D5/160 to D5/180 standard were also sent. The exact number of aircraft completed by OGMA is a point of contention but it is probable that 138 D.5 aircraft were completed with one kit becoming a test airframe and two kits remaining as a source of spares. The Portuguese Air Museum preserves two; one in flying condition.

A further three Auster D5/160 were sold to the Congo. Subsequently, Beagle developed the D5/160 as the "Beagle D5/180 Husky" with a 180 hp Lycoming O-360 engine, the first being G-ASBV first flown in 1962. Only 15 Husky aircraft were made before production was discontinued in 1967. Because each aircraft was custom-built to individual specifications, and there was no standard design of a Beagle Husky, production proved uneconomical. It was estimated that the cost of each Husky was £6,045, which was £1,747 more than the UK market price.

The last Husky, OE-DEW (c/n 3691), was the last of approximately 3868 aeroplanes in the Auster line to be produced by Auster/Beagle; this aircraft is now back in the UK, registered G-AXBF and is still airworthy (2018). Later a few more airframes of a variety of Auster models were completed from spare fuselages or converted privately.

The designation "A.113" was only a design number and was not used in promotional material or in aircraft registrations with the Civil Aviation Authority where the term 'D5/180' was preferred. Additionally, the name Husky was only given to this version and not to the D5/160.

== Operators ==
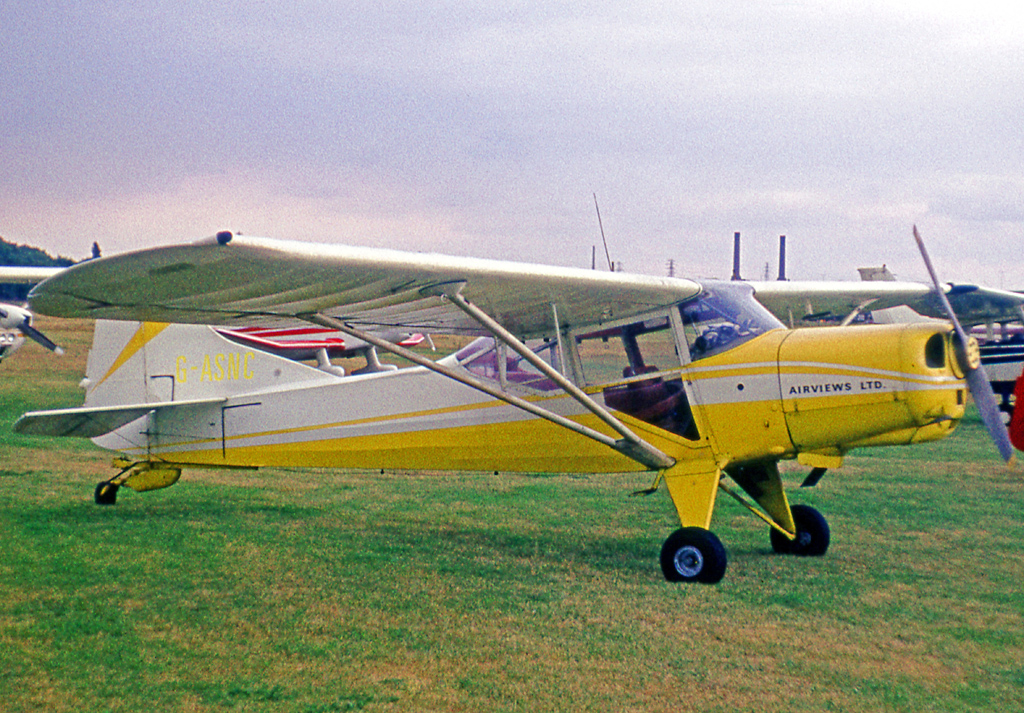
Husky of Airviews Ltd, Manchester, in 1971, fitted for banner towing and photography

Burma

- Burma Air Force

Portugal

- Portuguese Air Force

Thailand

- Royal Thai Police
  - Thai Border Patrol Police - One aircraft only.

United Kingdom

- Royal Air Force – One Beagle Husky (XW635) was won by Sir Billy Butlin in a raffle and presented to the RAF's Air Training Corps in 1969. It flew with No. 5 Air Experience Flight, flying air cadets from Cambridge Airport until it was retired in 1989 and sold to a civilian user.

== Specifications (D.5/160) ==
Data from British Civil Aircraft since 1919: Volume I

General characteristics

- Crew: 1
- Capacity: 2 passengers
- Length: 23 ft 4 1/2 in (7.125 m)
- Wingspan: 36 ft 0 in (10.97 m)
- Height: 7 ft 11 in (2.41 m)
- Wing area: 185 sq ft (17.2 m^{2})
- Empty weight: 1,450 lb (658 kg)
- Gross weight: 2,450 lb (1,111 kg)
- Powerplant: 1 × Lycoming O-320-A2A air-cooled flat-four engine, 160 hp (120 kW)

Performance

- Maximum speed: 125 mph (201 km/h, 109 kn)
- Cruise speed: 108 mph (174 km/h, 94 kn)
- Range: 460 mi (740 km, 400 nmi)
- Service ceiling: 12,800 ft (3,900 m)
- Rate of climb: 640 ft/min (3.3 m/s)

== See also ==
Related development

- Auster Alpha
