= List of aircraft (An–Az) =

This is a list of aircraft in alphabetical order beginning with the letters 'An' through 'Az'.

== An–Az ==
=== Anahuac ===
(Fabrica de Aviones Anahuac)

- HELLOTauro

=== Anatra ===
(Artur Antonovich Anatra)

- Anatra Anade
- Anatra Anamon
- Anatra Anasal
- Anatra Anakle
- Anatra Anadva
- Anatra D
- Anatra DE
- Anatra DS
- Anatra DSS
- Anatra Voisin-Ivanov (V.I.)
- Anatra Anadva-Salmson

=== ANBO ===
(Karo Aviacijos Tiekimo Skyrius - Military Aviation Supply Department) (ANBO - Antanas Nori Būti Ore – "Antanas wants to be airborne")

- ANBO I
- ANBO II
- ANBO III
- ANBO IV
- ANBO 41
- ANBO V
- ANBO 51
- ANBO VI
- ANBO VII
- ANBO VIII

=== Andermat ===
(Andermat Aeroplane Co)

- Andermat War Aeroplane

=== Anderson ===
(Anderson Aircraft Mfg Co)

- Welch Biplane

=== Anderson ===
(Louis "Andy" Anderson)

- Anderson #1
- Anderson #2
- Anderson #3
- Anderson Scampy
- Anderson Baby A

=== Anderson ===
(Andrew A. Anderson)

- Anderson Z

=== Anderson ===
(Maynard B Anderson)

- Anderson Honey Bee
- Anderson R-1 Rotorplane

=== Anderson ===
((Alvin E) Anderson Propeller Co)

- Anderson Special

=== Anderson ===
(Anderson Aircraft Corporation / Earl Anderson, Delray Beach, FL)

- Anderson EA-1 Kingfisher

=== Anderson Greenwood ===
((Ben M) Anderson, (Marvin H) Greenwood & Co)

- Anderson Greenwood AG-14
- Anderson Greenwood 51

=== Anderson-Gewert ===
(Charles Lee Anderson & E R Gewert, Reno, NV)

- Anderson-Gewert Racing Model

=== Andiz ===
(Andiz Aircraft Corp)

- Andiz 2-60
- Andiz C-2

=== Andreae ===
(F O Andreae)

- Andreae 1909 Multiplane

=== Andreasson ===
(Bjorn Andreasson, San Diego, CA)

- Andreasson BA-4
- Andreasson BA-6
- Andreasson BA-7
- Andreasson BA-11

=== Andrews ===
(Edward F Andrews)

- Andrews 1910 Biplane

=== Andrews ===
(C.G. Andrews, New Zealand)

- Andrews A1
- Andrews A2

=== Andrews-Acre ===
- Andrews-Acre monoplane

=== Andrews & Nicholson ===
(Henry G Andrews & Ray E Nicholson)

- Andrews & Nicholson T-1

=== ANEC ===
(Air Navigation and Engineering Company)

- ANEC I
- ANEC II
- ANEC III
- ANEC IV

=== Anequim ===
(Anequim Project Team)

- Anequim Project Team Anequim

=== ANF Les Mureaux ===
(Atelier du Nord de la France Les Mureaux / Ateliers Les Mureaux)

- Les Mureaux 3
- Les Mureaux 4
- ANF Les Mureaux 110
- ANF Les Mureaux 111
- ANF Les Mureaux 112
- ANF Les Mureaux 113
- ANF Les Mureaux 114
- ANF Les Mureaux 115
- ANF Les Mureaux 117
- ANF Les Mureaux 119
- ANF Les Mureaux 120
- ANF Les Mureaux 121
- ANF Les Mureaux 130 A2
- ANF Les Mureaux 131 A2
- ANF Les Mureaux 140
- ANF Les Mureaux 160
- ANF Les Mureaux 170
- ANF Les Mureaux 180
- ANF Les Mureaux 190
- ANF Les Mureaux 200
- A.N.F. 'Express Les Mureaux'
- A.N.F. Les Mureaux 'Express-Marin'

=== Anglin ===
(Jesse Anglin)

- Anglin J6 Karatoo
- Anglin J6B Australian Karatoo
- Anglin J6C Australian Karatoo

=== Angus ===
(Arthur Leighton Angus)

- Angus Aquila

=== Ann Arbor ===
(Ann Arbor Air Service)

- Brundage R-3

=== Ansaldo ===
(Ansaldo Aeronautica, 336 Corso Francia, Turin, Italy)

- Ansaldo A.1 Balilla
- Ansaldo A.115
- Ansaldo A.120
- Ansaldo A.300
- Ansaldo AC.1
- Ansaldo AC.2
- Ansaldo AC.3
- Ansaldo AC.4
- Ansaldo ISVA
- Ansaldo SVA.1
- Ansaldo SVA.2
- Ansaldo SVA.3
- Ansaldo SVA.4
- Ansaldo SVA.5
- Ansaldo SVA.6
- Ansaldo SVA.8
- Ansaldo SVA.9
- Ansaldo SVA.10

=== Antares Aircraft ===
(Antares Aircraft, Ukraine)

- Antares MA-32
- Antares A-10R503 SOLO
- Antares MA-32 R503
- Antares MA-32 R582 G
- Antares MA-33
- Antares MA-33M R582
- Antares MA-33M R912
- Antares MA-34 R912 Ranger
- Antares MA-34R912S Beaver
- Antares MA-34 Open Country
- Antares MA-34 R582XB Crop Duster

=== Antilles ===
- Antilles Goose

=== Antique Aero ===
(Antique Aero, Asbury Park, NJ)

- Antique Aero Replica Albatros D.V
- Antique Aero Replica Albatros D.Va
- Antique Aero Replica Fokker D.VII
- Antique Aero Replica Fokker Dr.I
- Antique Aero Replica Fokker E.III
- Antique Aero Replica Nieuport 28
- Antique Aero Replica Sopwith 1½ Strutter
- Antique Aero Replica Sopwith Camel
- Antique Aero Replica Sopwith Pup

=== Antoinette ===
(Léon Levavasseur)

- Antoinette I
- Antoinette II
- Antoinette III
- Antoinette IV
- Antoinette V
- Antoinette VI
- Antoinette VII
- Antoinette VIII
- Antoinette Latham (Antoinette IV with extended wings and a melange of IV and V undercarriage parts.)
- Antoinette military monoplane
- Antoinette Gastambide Mengin

=== Antonov ===
- Antonov 181
- Antonov '400'
- Antonov E-153 flying testbed for aircraft 'M'
- Antonov 'AE' proposed liaison aircraft
- Antonov 'B' experimental air trailer (tow glider); also known as 'VP'
- Antonov 'E' projected sport aircraft
- Antonov 'K' high-altitude weather reconnaissance aircraft based on An-2; precursor of An-6
- Antonov LEM-2 experimental glider-plane
- Antonov 'M' Masha, projected jet fighter
- Antonov 'N' planned passenger version of An-8; cancelled in favor of the An-10
- Antonov OKA-38 Soviet copy of Fi 156
- Antonov SKh-1 initial designation of An-2
- Antonov SKV Partizanskii, projected STOL military transport
- Antonov T-2M Maverick ultralight aircraft
- Antonov 'U' turboprop airliner; precursor of An-10
- Antonov 'VT-22' large turboprop transport, precursor of An-22
- Antonov 'Yu' planned large double-deck turboprop transport
- Antonov-Beriev Be-20 planned small trijet airliner; lost to the Yakovlev Yak-40
- Antonov An-2 multipurpose utility single-engine biplane
- Antonov An-3 (I) redesigned An-2A to intercept US reconnaissance balloons overflying the USSR
- Antonov An-3 (II) projected turboprop version of An-2 with new fuselage and an An-2M tail
- Antonov An-3 (III) turboprop conversion of An-2
- Antonov An-4 An-2 with floats
- Antonov An-6 Meteo, high-altitude weather reconnaissance aircraft based on An-2
- Antonov An-8 medium military transport
- Antonov An-10 Ukraina, medium turboprop airliner
- Antonov An-12 turboprop military transport developed from the An-10
- Antonov An-13 jet-powered version of A-13 glider
- Antonov An-14 Pchelka, light twin-engine transport
- Antonov An-16 projected stretched version of An-10
- Antonov An-18 military transport
- Antonov An-20 trainer
- Antonov An-20 projected large turboprop transport; cancelled in favor of VT-22
- Antonov An-22 Antei, large military turboprop transport
- Antonov An-24 twin turboprop regional airliner
- Antonov An-25 anti-balloon aircraft
- Antonov An-26 projected airliner
- Antonov An-26 Nastia, turboprop transport derived from the An-24
- Antonov An-28 twin turboprop light transport developed from the An-14
- Antonov An-30 Nastia, aerial cartography version of An-24
- Antonov An-32 projected VTOL military transport
- Antonov An-32 military transport; up-engined An-26 for hot and high conditions
- Antonov An-36 projected VTOL military transport
- Antonov An-38 projected VTOL military transport
- Antonov An-38 twin turboprop light transport; stretched An-28
- Antonov An-40 planned derivative of the An-12D with four AI-30 engines and four RD-36-35 booster/brake engines with thrust reversers; lost to the Ilyushin Il-76
- Antonov An-42 version of An-40 with boundary layer control
- Antonov An-44 projected cargo aircraft developed from the An-24
- Antonov An-46 projected military transport
- Antonov An-49 projected aircraft for transporting orbital spacecraft
- Antonov An-50 projected jetliner developed from the An-24V
- Antonov An-51 light piston-engine civil utility aircraft
- Antonov An-52 light twin-engine piston aircraft
- Antonov An-60 projected STOL military transport; forerunner to the An-72/An-74
- Antonov An-64 projected military transport
- Antonov An-70 large propfan military transport
- Antonov An-71 prototype naval AWACS development of An-72
- Antonov An-72 Cheburashka, STOL transport aircraft
- Antonov An-74 Cheburashka, upgraded An-72
- Antonov An-75 proposed carrier-based derivative of An-71
- Antonov An-80 projected airliner version of An-72/An-74
- Antonov An-89 projected reconnaissance aircraft
- Antonov An-90 projected airliner
- Antonov An-91 twin-engine cabin monoplane development of Cessna 310
- Antonov An-102 light agricultural aircraft project
- Antonov An-104 light agricultural aircraft project
- Antonov An-112 projected military transport
- Antonov An-112KC projected refueling tanker based on the An-70
- Antonov An-122 proposed development of An-22 with turbojet engines, a T-tail and swept wings
- Antonov An-122 proposed military transport
- Antonov An-124 Ruslan, strategic airlifter
- Antonov An-125 heavy transport aircraft project
- Antonov An-126 heavy transport aircraft project
- Antonov An-126P projected airliner
- Antonov An-128 projected light transport aircraft based on the An-28 and An-38
- Antonov An-132 airliner project
- Antonov An-132 airliner project
- Antonov An-132 light transport aircraft based on An-32
- Antonov An-140 short-range turboprop airliner; intended as an An-24 replacement
- Antonov An-142 projected AWACS aircraft based on An-124
- Antonov An-142 projected cargo freighter version of An-140
- Antonov An-144 projected AWACS aircraft based on An-170
- Antonov An-148 twin-engine regional jet developed from the An-74
- Antonov An-158 stretched version of An-148
- Antonov An-168 business jet version of An-148; now known as An-148-300
- Antonov An-170 proposed enlarged version of An-70
- Antonov An-171 proposed maritime patrol version of An-170
- Antonov An-172 projected anti-submarine aircraft
- Antonov An-174 enlarged An-74 with engines below wings
- Antonov An-178 medium military transport based on the An-158
- Antonov An-180 projected medium propfan airliner
- Antonov An-188 proposed medium military transport based on the An-70; basically a westernized An-70 with turbojet engines
- Antonov An-218 projected propfan- or turbofan-powered airliner
- Antonov An-222 projected military transport
- Antonov An-224 original proposal of An-225 with rear cargo door
- Antonov An-225 Mriya; strategic airlifter derived from the An-124
- Antonov An-274 projected cargo freighter
- Antonov An-325 planned enlarged, eight-engine version of An-225 for launching spacecraft
- Antonov An-418 projected airliner version of the An-124

=== Anzani ===
(Alexandre Anzani)

- Anzani 1909 Monoplane (aka "de Mas Monoplane" after a probable sponsor)

=== Apco Aviation ===
(Caesarea, Israel)

- Apco Activa
- Apco Air Xtreme
- Apco Allegra
- Apco Bagheera
- Apco Enigma
- Apco Extra
- Apco Fiesta
- Apco Force
- Apco Fun
- Apco Futura
- Apco Game
- Apco HiLite
- Apco Karma
- Apco Keara
- Apco Lift
- Apco NRG
- Apco Play
- Apco Presta
- Apco Prima
- Apco Salsa
- Apco Santana
- Apco Sierra
- Apco Simba
- Apco Speedstar
- Apco Starlite
- Apco System K
- Apco Tetra
- Apco Tigra
- Apco Thrust
- Apco Twister
- Apco Vista
- Apco Zefira

=== APEV ===
(Association pour la Promotion des Echelles Volantes, (English: Association for the Promotion of Flying Ladders), Peynier, France)

- APEV Bipochel
- APEV Cubchel
- APEV Demoichelle
- APEV Pouchel
- APEV Pouchel II
- APEV Pouchel Light
- APEV Pouchel Classic
- APEV Pouchelec
- APEV Scoutchel

=== Apex ===
(Apex Aviation, Czech Republic)

- Apex Eco 6
- Apex Dolphin 3
- Apex Cross 5

=== Apex ===
(Apex Aircraft)

- Apex Robin
- Apex CAP-10
- Apex CAP-232
- Apex Alpha 2000

=== Apollo Ultralight Aircraft ===
(Apollo Ultralight Aircraft / Halley Ltd., Eger, Hungary)

- Apollo C15D Toples
- Apollo Classic
- Apollo Delta Jet
- Apollo Delta Jet 2
- Apollo Fox
- Apollo Gyro AG1
- Apollo Jet Star
- Apollo Monsoon
- Apollo Racer GT

=== Applebay ===
- Applebay Chiricahua
- Applebay Mescalero
- Applebay Zia
- Applebay Zuni
- Applebay Zuni II

=== Applegate ===
((Ray) Applegate Amphibians, Lock Haven, PA)

- Applegate Amphibian

=== Applegate-Weyant ===
(Applegate & Weyant, Tecumseh MI, Elkhart, IN)

- Applegate-Weyant Dart GC

=== Aquaflight ===
(Aquaflight Inc, 1601 Harrison Ave, Wilmington, DE)

- Aquaflight Aqua I
- Aquaflight Aqua II
- Aquaflight W-6
- Aquaflight W-6A

=== Aquila ===
(Aquila Aviation by Excellence)

- Aquila A 210
- Aquila A 211

=== Aquilair ===
(Theize, France)

- Aquilair Kid
- Aquilair Swing
- Aquilair Chariot Biplace
- Aquilair Chariot Monoplace

=== Arado ===
(Arado Flugzeugwerke GmbH) (For WWII projects with no RLM designation see: List of German aircraft projects, 1939–1945)

- Arado Ar 64
- Arado Ar 65
- Arado Ar 66
- Arado Ar 67
- Arado Ar 68
- Arado Ar 69
- Arado Ar 75
- Arado Ar 76
- Arado Ar 77
- Arado Ar 79
- Arado Ar 80
- Arado Ar 81
- Arado Ar 95
- Arado Ar 96
- Arado Ar 195
- Arado Ar 196
- Arado Ar 197
- Arado Ar 198
- Arado Ar 199
- Arado Ar 231
- Arado Ar 232
- Arado Ar 233 was a twin-engine, high-wing, ten-passenger touring and communications seaplane not built
- Arado Ar 234 Blitz
- Arado Ar 234 B-2
- Arado Ar 239 Project
- Arado Ar 240
- Arado Ar 296
- Arado Ar 334 Project
- Arado Ar 340 was a twin-engine, twin-boom medium bomber project
- Arado Ar 396
- Arado Ar 430
- Arado Ar 432
- Arado Ar 440
- Arado Ar 532 was a projected development of Ar 432
- Arado Ar 632 was a projected development of Ar 432 four engines transport aircraft
- Arado L I
- Arado L II
- Arado S I
- Arado S III
- Arado SC I
- Arado SC II
- Arado SD I
- Arado SD II
- Arado SD III
- Arado SSD I
- Arado V I
- Arado W 2

=== ARAF ===
- ARAF Cammandre 1

=== Arco ===
(Arco Aircraft Co (founders: J T & Richard Arwine))

- Arco 1930 Sportplane

=== Arctic Aircraft ===
(Arctic Aviation / Arctic Aircraft Co (fdr: Bill Diehl))

- Arctic Aircraft Arctic Tern

=== ARDC ===
(Aeronautical Research and Development Corporation)

- ARDC RP-440 Omega

=== Arey ===
(Krasnoyarsk, Russia)

- Arey Tatush
- Arey Telezhka

=== Argonaut ===
(Argonaut Aircraft Inc)

- Argonaut H.20 Pirate
- Argonaut H.24 Pirate

=== Argus ===
(Argus Motoren GmbH)

- Argus As 292 - see DFS Mo 12

=== Ariel ===
(Stearman-Jensen Aircraft Co / Stearman Aviation Incorporated / Ariel Aircraft Inc (Glenn A Stearman, Pres))

- Ariel A
- Ariel B

=== Arion ===
- Arion Lightning

=== Arizona Airways ===
(Arizona Airways Inc)

- Arizona Airways Whitewing

=== Arkansas ===
- Arkansas CX-3

=== Arkhangelsky ===
- Arkhangelsky Ar-2
- Arkhangelsky SBB

=== Arlais ===
- Arlais AC.210

=== Armada ===
((Bert) Acosta Aviation, Trenton, NJ)

- Armada A

=== Armel ===
(M C Armel, 243 E Daugherty St, Athens, GA)

- Armel White Dove Commercial

=== Armella-Senemaud ===
(Armella & Senemaud)

- Armella-Senemaud AS.10 Mistral

=== Armitage ===
(George Armitage, Providence, RI)

- Armitage 1910 Monoplane
- Armitage S-8

=== Armstrong Siddeley ===
- Siddeley-Deasy Sinaia (1921) - Bomber (1 built)

=== Armstrong Whitworth ===
Sir W. G. Armstrong Whitworth & Company (1912–1920)
After merger with Siddeley-Deasy, Sir W. G. Armstrong Whitworth Aircraft Company (1920–1927)
Armstrong Whitworth Aircraft (1927–1963)

- Armstrong Whitworth Ajax
- Armstrong Whitworth Albemarle
- Armstrong Whitworth Apollo
- Armstrong Whitworth Ara
- Armstrong Whitworth Argosy
- Armstrong Whitworth Aries
- Armstrong Whitworth F.M.4 Armadillo
- Armstrong Whitworth Atalanta
- Armstrong Whitworth Atlas
- Armstrong Whitworth AW.16
- Armstrong Whitworth AW.52
- Armstrong Whitworth AW.52G
- Armstrong Whitworth AW.171
- Armstrong Whitworth AW.660 Argosy
- Armstrong Whitworth AW.681
- Armstrong Whitworth Awana
- Armstrong Whitworth Ensign
- Armstrong Whitworth F.K.1
- Armstrong Whitworth F.K.2
- Armstrong Whitworth F.K.3
- Armstrong Whitworth F.K.4
- Armstrong Whitworth F.K.5
- Armstrong Whitworth F.K.6
- Armstrong Whitworth F.K.7
- Armstrong Whitworth F.K.8
- Armstrong Whitworth F.K.9
- Armstrong Whitworth F.K.10
- Armstrong Whitworth F.K.12
- Armstrong Whitworth F.K.13
- Armstrong Whitworth Sea Hawk
- Armstrong Whitworth Scimitar
- Armstrong Whitworth Siskin
- Armstrong Whitworth Sissit
- Armstrong Whitworth Starling
- Armstrong Whitworth Whitley
- Armstrong Whitworth Wolf

=== Arnet Pereyra Inc ===
- Arnet Pereyra Buccaneer
- Arnet Pereyra Buccaneer II
- Arnet Pereyra Sabre II

=== Arnold ===
(Mike Arnold, Pinole CA.)

- Arnold AR-5
- Arnold AR-6 (Hoover AR-6)

=== Arnoud ===
- Arnoud 1911 Biplane

=== Arnoux ===
(René Arnoux / Société des Avions Simplex)

- Arnoux 1909 Biplane (No.1)
- Arnoux 1912 Monoplane (No.2)
- Arnoux Stabloplan 1912 (No.3)
- Arnoux Stablavion 1913 (No.4)
- Arnoux Stabloplan 1914 (No.5)
- Arnoux Simplex 10hp
- Arnoux Simplex 320hp
- Arnoux HD14 sans Queue 1923

=== Arocet ===
(Arocet Inc, Arlington, WA)

- Arocet AT-9
- Arocet AT-T Tactical Trainer

=== Arpin ===
- Arpin A-1

=== Arplast Helice ===
- Arplast Micro'B

=== Arrow ===
(Arrow Aircraft Ltd.)

- Arrow Active

=== Arrow ===
(Arrow Aircraft & Motors Corp)

- Arrow Five
- Arrow Sedan
- Arrow Model F
- Arrow Sport
- Arrow Sport Pursuit

=== Arrowhead ===
(Safety Aircraft Corp (B L Smith), Miami, FL)

- Safety Airplane B-2

=== Arrowplane ===
(Arrowplane Mfg Co)

- Arrowplane 1910 Biplane

=== Arsenal ===
(Arsenal de l'Aéronautique) (renamed as SFECMAS - Société Française d’étude Et de Construction de Matériels Aéronautiques Spéciaux in 1949) Source:

- Arsenal O.101
- Arsenal VB 10
- Arsenal VB 11
- Arsenal VB 12
- Arsenal VB 14
- Arsenal VG 10
- Arsenal VG 20
- Arsenal VG 30
- Arsenal VG 31
- Arsenal VG 32
- Arsenal VG 33
- Arsenal VG 34
- Arsenal VG 35
- Arsenal VG 36
- Arsenal VG 37
- Arsenal VG 38
- Arsenal VG 39
- Arsenal VG 40
- Arsenal VG 50
- Arsenal VG 60
- Arsenal VG 70
- Arsenal VG 80
- Arsenal VG 90
- Arsenal-Delanne 10
- Arsenal 1301
- Arsenal 2301

=== Arsenalul ===
(Arsenalul Aeronautic - Bucharest)

- Arsenalul Aeron
- Arsenalul Brandemburg
- Arsenalul Proto 1

=== Arts & Métiers ===
- Arts & Métiers AM-69

=== Artois ===
(Chantiers de l'Artois)

- d'Artois 'Aérotorpille'
- d'Artois 'Hydroaéroplane'

=== Artomov ===
(Mikhail Artomov)

- Artomov Simburg

=== Arup ===
(Arup Manufacturing Corporation (fdr: Cloyd L Snyder))

- Arup S-1
- Arup S-2
- Arup S-3
- Arup S-4

=== ARV ===
(Canada Air RV and later by AC Millennium Corp)

- ARV Griffin

=== ARV ===
(ARV, United Kingdom)

- ARV Super2

=== ASA (aircraft constructor) ===
- ASA-200

=== Asboth ===
(Oscar von Asboth)

- Asboth 1908 biplane
- Asboth AH-1
- Asboth AH-2
- Asboth AH-3
- Asboth AH-4

=== Ascanio ===
- Ascanio Helicopter

=== Ascension ===
- Ascension 1908 Aircraft

=== Ashley ===
(David Dexter Ashley)

- Ashley SP-5 Bob-O-Link

=== Svenska Aero/ASJA ===
(AktieBolaget Svenska Järnvägsverkstädernas Aeroplanavdelning)

- ASJA SA 11/J5 Jaktfalken
- ASJA SA 14/J6 Jaktfalken I/II
- ASJA F1
- ASJA L1 Viking
- ASJA L2
- ASJA L10
- ASJA L11
- ASJA L12 (SAAB J19)
- ASJA Viking II
- ASJA Sk10 Tigerschwalbe (Raab-Katzenstein RK-26 Tigerschwalbe)

=== Ask-Nyrop ===
(Oscar Ask and Hjalmar Nyrop)

- Ask-Nyrop Monoplane No.1 Gräshoppan (obviously greatly inspired by the Bleriot XI)

=== Askew ===
(Charles E Askew)

- Askew M-3

=== ASL ===
(Aeronautical Syndicate Ltd)

- ASL monoplane No.1
- ASL monoplane No.2
- ASL Valkyrie I (Type A)
- ASL Valkyrie II (Type C)
- ASL Valkyrie III (Type B)
- ASL Passenger Carrier (Type C)
- ASL Racer (Type B)
- ASL Viking

=== ASO ===
(Air Sud Ouest)

- ASO-1070 Griffon

=== Asso Aerei ===
(Giuseppe Vidor, Italy)

- Asso I
- Asso II
- Asso III
- Asso IV Whiskey
- Asso V Champion
- Asso V Jolly
- Asso V X-Ray
- Asso VI Junior
- Asso VI Evolution
- Asso VII
- Asso VIII Centauro
- Asso IX Warrior
- Asso X Jewel
- Asso XI Sprint
- Asso XIV Spitfire

=== Associated ===
- Associated 1929 Monoplane

=== Associated Air ===
(Woodland, WA)

- Associated Air Liberty 181

=== Ast ===
(Carl & Vincent Ast, Van Nuys, CA)

- Ast Special
- Ast Mercury Air

=== ASTA ===
(Aerospace Technologies of Australia Pty. Ltd.)

- ASTA Nomad

=== Asteria ===
- Asteria No. 3

=== Aston Martin ===
- Aston Martin Volante Vision Concept

=== Astoux-Védrines ===
(L.L. Astoux (designer) & Jules Charles Toussaint Védrines (pilot))

- Astoux-Védrines Triplane

=== Astra ===
(Astra of Arad, Romania) (aircraft production moved to IAR in 1925)

- Astra-Proto
- Astra-Şeşefski
- Proto-1
- Proto-2
- Proto-S.E.T.-2

=== Astra ===
(Société de Constructions Aéronautiques Astra)

- Astra-Wright Type A
- Astra-Wright Type 1910
- Astra-Wright BB
- Astra-Wright Type L
- Astra-Wright Type E
- Astra Type C
- Astra Type CM
- Astra Type CM Hydro
- Astra Triplane
- Astra-Kapferer tandem monoplane
- Astra 1916 bomber
- Astra-Paulhan flying boat

=== AstroFlight ===
- AstroFlight Sunrise

=== AT & T Company ===
- AT & T Company Aquaglide-5

=== ATA ===
- ATA Cruiser

=== Atlanta ===
- Atlanta Aircraft Corporation, aka Prudden-Whitehead (founders: George H. Prudden, Edward Whitehead)

See: Prudden

=== Atalante ===
- Atalante GB-10

=== ATEC v.o.s. ===
(Libice nad Cidlinou, Czech Republic)

- ATEC 122 Zephyr 2000
- ATEC 212 Solo
- ATEC 321 Faeta

=== ATE-International ===
- ATE Saphire

=== Ateliers Aeronautique de Boulogne ===
- Ateliers Aeronautique de Boulogne Ju 88

=== Ateliers Aeronautique de Colombes ===
- Ateliers Aeronautique de Colombes AAC.1

=== Ateliers Aéronautiques de Suresnes ===
- Ateliers Aeronautique de Suresnes AAS.01

=== Ateliers Fred Herrmann ===
- De Glymes DG X

=== Atelier Technique Aéronautique de Rickenbach ===
- ATAR-23

=== ATG ===
(Aviation Technology Group Inc, Englewood, CO)

- ATG Javelin

=== Atlanta ===
(Atlanta Aircraft Corp, (founders: George H Prudden, Edward Whitehead) Atlanta, GA)

- Atlanta PW-1
- Atlanta PW-2

=== Atlantic ===
(Atlantic Aircraft Co.)

- Atlantic Battleplane

=== Atlantic, Atlantic-Fokker ===
see Fokker

=== Atlantic Coast (aircraft constructor) ===
- Atlantic Coast F-5L

=== Atlas ===
- Atlas ACE
- Atlas Alpha XH-1
- Atlas Cheetah
- Atlas Kudu
- Atlas Impala
- Atlas Oryx
- Atlas XH-2

=== Atlas ===
(Atlas Aircraft Corp, Hemet, CA)

- Atlas Blitzfighter/Bushwacker
- Atlas H-10
- Ling Temco Vought/Atlas A100
- Ling Temco Vought/Atlas A201

=== ATOL ===
- ATOL 495
- ATOL 650

=== ATR ===
(Avion de Transport Régional)

- ATR-42
- ATR-52
- ATR-72

=== Atwood ===
(Harry N Atwood, Saugus, MA

- Atwood-Wright 1911 Biplane
- Atwood 1913 Biplane

=== Aubert Aviation ===
(Paul Aubert)

- Aubert PA-20 Cigale
- Aubert PA-201 Cigale
- Aubert PA-204 Cigale Major
- Aubert PA-205 Super Cigale
- Aubert PA-300 Grillon

=== Aubiet ===
(Marceau Aubiet)

- Aubiet 1922 man powered aeroplane

=== Audenis ===
(Charles Audenis and Jean Jacob)

- Audenis E.P.2
- Audenis C2

=== Auffm-Ordt ===
(Clément Auffm-Ordt)

- Auffm-Ordt monoplan 1908

=== Aura Aero ===
- Aura Aero Integral R

=== Aurebach ===
(R H Aurebach)

- Aurebach Wasp Special

=== AURI ===
(Angkatan Udara Republik Indonesia, Depot Penjelidikan, Pertjobaan dan Pembutan - Indonesian Air force research, development, and production depot)

see Indonesian Aerospace

=== Aurora ===
- Aurora Concept Plane

=== Aurore Sarl ===
(Sauvagnon, France)

- Aurore MB 02 Souricette
- Aurore MB 02-2 Mini Bulle
- Aurore MB 04 Souris Bulle

=== Ausmus ===
(Reinhardt Ausmus, Sandusky, OH)

- Ausmus 1912 Monoplane

=== Auster ===
- Auster A.2/45
- Auster AOP.3
- Auster AOP.6
- Auster AOP.8 (not built)
- Auster AOP.9
- Auster AOP.11
- Auster T.7
- Auster T.7 Antarctic
- Auster T.10
- Auster Adventurer
- Auster Agricola
- Auster Aiglet
- Auster Aiglet Trainer
- Auster Alpha
- Auster Alpine
- Auster Arrow
- Auster Atom
- Auster Autocar
- Auster Autocrat
- Auster Avis
- Auster Workmaster
- Taylorcraft Plus C - licence-built Taylorcraft B
- Taylorcraft Plus D - re-engined Plus C.
- Taylorcraft Auster Model D - Auster I - military version of Plus C with enlarged windows.
- Taylorcraft Auster Model E - Auster III - re-engined Auster I with split flaps.
- Taylorcraft Auster Model F - Auster II - re-engined Auster I.
- Taylorcraft Auster Model G - Auster IV - enlarged version of Auster III.
- Taylorcraft Auster Model H - Experimental tandem two-seat training glider converted from Taylorcraft B.
- Taylorcraft Auster Model J - Auster V - Auster IV with blind-flying instruments.
- Taylorcraft Auster I - military version of Plus C with enlarged windows.
- Taylorcraft Auster II - re-engined Auster I.
- Taylorcraft Auster III - re-engined Auster I with split flaps.
- Taylorcraft Auster IV - enlarged version of Auster III.
- Taylorcraft Auster V - Auster IV with blind-flying instruments.
- Auster J-1 Autocrat - Three-seat high-winged monoplane light aircraft (fitted with Blackburn Cirrus Minor II engine)
- Auster J-1A Autocrat - Four-seat version of Autocrat
- Auster J-1B Aiglet - Re-engined agricultural version of Autocraft (De Havilland Gipsy Major engine)
- Auster J-1N Alpha - Re-engined four-seat Autocrat (De Havilland Gipsy Major engine)
- Auster J-1S Autocrat
- Auster J-1U Workmaster - Agricultural version of the Alpha
- Auster J-2 Arrow
- Auster J-3 Atom - low-powered version of Arrow with Continental engine
- Auster J-4 - Arrow with Blackburn Cirrus Minor I engine
- Auster J-5 Autocar
- Auster J-5Q Alpine
- Auster J-5R Alpine
- Auster J-8L Aiglet Trainer
- Auster 6A Tugmaster - Glider towing conversion of the Auster 6
- Auster 6B / Beagle Terrier - civil conversion of the Auster 6
- Auster 9M
- Auster Model K - A.O.P.6
- Auster Model L Proposed low-wing monoplane, not built.
- Auster Model M - Auster A2/45 - 2 or 3-seat high-wing AOP aircraft, prototype only.
- Auster Model N - Auster A2/45 - Re-engined Model M, prototype only.
- Auster Model P - Auster Avis - four-seater based on J/1 with slimmer fuselage, two built.
- Auster Model Q - Auster T7 - two-seat trainer version of AOP6.
- Auster Model S - AOP aircraft based on AOP6 with enlarged tail, prototype only.
- Auster Model A.7 Light twin project, not built.
- Auster Model B.1 Mid-wing AOP project, not built.
- Auster Model B.3 - radio-controlled target drone.
- Auster Model B.4
- Auster Model B.5 - AOP.9
- Auster Model B.6 low-wing agricultural project, not built.
- Auster Model B.8 - Auster B.8 Agricola - Low-winged agricultural aircraft
- Auster Model B.9 Ramjet helicopter project, not built
- Auster Model C.4 - Auster Antarctic - Modified Auster T7 for Antarctic support.
- Auster Model C.6 - Auster Atlantic - four-seat high-wing touring monoplane with tricycle undercarriage, one built.
- Auster Model D.4
- Auster Model D.5
- Auster Model D.6
- Auster Model D.8 - Original designation of Beagle Airedale.
- Auster Model E.8 - AOP9 with modified engines as the AOP11.

=== Austin ===
(F C Austin, Lake Worth, FL)

- Austin 1935 Monoplane

=== Austin Motor Company ===
- Austin-Ball A.F.B.1
- Austin A.F.T.3 Osprey
- Austin Greyhound
- Austin Kestrel
- Austin Whippet

=== Australian Aircraft & Engineering Company ===
- Australian Aircraft & Engineering Company Commercial B1

=== Australian Aircraft Industries ===
- AAI AA-2 Mamba

=== Australian Aircraft Kits ===
(Australian Aircraft Kits Pty Ltd, Taree, New South Wales, Australia)

- Australian Aircraft Kits Bushman
- Australian Aircraft Kits Hornet Cub
- Australian Aircraft Kits Hornet STOL
- Australian Aircraft Kits Wasp

=== Australian Autogyro ===
- Australian Autogyro Skyhook

=== AIC ===
(Australian Industrial Corporation)

- AIC AA-2 Mamba

=== Australian Lightwing ===
(Howard Hughes Engineering, Ballina, New South Wales, Australia)

- Australian Lightwing GR 582
- Australian Lightwing GR 912
- Australian Lightwing Pocket Rocket
- Australian Lightwing PR BiPe
- Australian Lightwing PR Breeze
- Australian Lightwing SP-2000 Speed
- Australian Lightwing SP-4000 Speed
- Australian Lightwing SP-6000
- Australian Lightwing Sport 2000
- Australian Lightwing Tapis

=== Australian Ultralight Industries ===
- Australian Ultralight Industries Bunyip

=== Auto-Aero ===
- Auto-Aero Gobe R-26S

=== Autogiro ===
(Autogiro Company of America (patent-licensing division of Pitcairn Co), Willow Grove, PA)

- Autogiro Company of America AC-35

=== AutoGyro ===
(AutoGyro GmbH)

- AutoGyro MT-03
- AutoGyro MTOsport
- AutoGyro Calidus
- AutoGyro Cavalon
- AutoGyro eCavalon

=== Av8er Limited ===
(Woodford Halse, Northamptonshire, United Kingdom)

- Av8er Explorer
- Av8er Observer Light
- Av8er Orbiter

=== AV Leichtflugzeuge ===
- AV Vagabund

=== AV Leichtflugzeuge ===
(Haren, Germany)

- AV Leichtflugzeuge Vagabund

=== AVA ===
(Aerodynamische Versuchsanstalt, Göttingen)

- AVA AF 1
- AVA AF 2

=== Avalon ===
- Avalon Turbo Canso

=== Avama ===
(Avama s.r.o., Poprad, Slovakia)

- Avama Stylus

=== AvCraft ===
- AvCraft Aerospace)
- AvCraft-Dornier Do328jet

=== AVDI ===
(AViacijas DIvizions)

- AVDI

=== AVE ===
(Advanced Vehicle Engineers)

- AVE Mizar

=== Aveko ===
(Aveko s.r.o., Brno, Czech Republic)

- Aveko VL-3 Sprint

=== AVEX ===
(asociacion Argentina de constructores de AViones EXperimentales)

- AVEX Armar I Gorrion ( Yves Arambide & Norberto Marino)
- AVEX Ghinassi helicopter (Sesto Ghinassi)
- AVEX Yakstas racer (Adolfo Yakstas)

=== AVI ===
(AVI, Argentina)

- AVI HF2/185
- AVI 185
- AVI 205
- AVI 225

=== AVIA ===
(Ateliers vosgiens d'industrie aéronautique)

- AVIA X-A
- AVIA XI-A
- AVIA XV-A
- AVIA XX-A
- AVIA 22A
- AVIA 30E
- AVIA 32E
- AVIA 40P
- AVIA 41P
- AVIA 50MP
- AVIA 60MP
- AVIA 151A
- AVIA 152A

=== Avia ===
(Avia-Zavody Jirího Dimitrova, Czechoslovakia)

- Avia 14
- Avia 36
- Avia 51
- Avia 57
- Avia 156
- Avia 236
- Avia B-33
- Avia B-34
  - Avia B-234
  - Avia B-334
  - Avia B-434
  - Avia B-534
  - Avia B-634
- Avia B-35
  - Avia B-135
- Avia B.71
- Avia B-122
  - Avia Ba-122
  - Avia Bs-122
  - Avia Ba-222
  - Avia Ba-322
  - Avia Ba-422
- Avia B-158
- Avia BH-1
- Avia BH-2
- Avia BH-3
- Avia BH-4
- Avia BH-5
- Avia BH-6
- Avia BH-7
- Avia BH-7A
- Avia BH-7B
- Avia BH-8
- Avia BH-9
- Avia BH-10
- Avia BH-11
- Avia BH-12
- Avia BH-16
- Avia BH-17
- Avia BH-19
- Avia BH-20
- Avia BH-21
- Avia BH-21J
- Avia BH-22
- Avia BH-23
- Avia BH-25
- Avia BH-26
- Avia BH-27
- Avia BH-28
- Avia BH-29
- Avia BH-33
- Avia C.2b
- Avia F.IX
- Avia F.39
- Avia F.139
- Avia S-92
- Avia S-99
- Avia S-199
- Avia BH-11B Antilopa (Antelope)

=== AVIA ===
(Azionaria Vercallese Industrie Aeronautiche)

- AVIA FL.3
- AVIA LM.51
- AVIA LM.02

=== Avia ===
(Avia Scientific-Production Association JSC -Nauchno-Proizodstvennoe Obedinenie Avia Ltd.)

- Avia Accord-201

=== Aviacor ===
(Aviacor Aviation Depot JSC - Aviakor Aviatsionnoye Zavod OAO)

=== Aviad ===
(Aviad Francesco Di Martino)

- Aviad Zigolo MG12

=== Aviadesign ===
(Aviadesign Inc, Camarillo, CA)

- Aviadesign A-16 Sport Falcon

=== Aviafiber ===
- Aviafiber Canard 2FL

=== Aviaimpex ===
- Aviaimpex Angel

=== Aviakit ===
(Aviakit Flight Concept SARL)

- Aviakit Vega

=== Aviamilano ===
(Aviamilano Costruzione Aeronautiche)

- Aviamilano CPV1
- Aviamilano A-2
- Aviamilano A-3
- Aviamilano F.250
- Aviamilano F.260
- Aviamilano Falco
- Aviamilano Nibbio
- Aviamilano P.19 Scricciolo (Wren)

=== Aviaimpeks ===
- Aviaimpex Yanhol

=== Avian ===
(Avian Aircraft Ltd.)

- Avian 2/180 Gyroplane

=== Aviana ===
- Aviana 10

=== Aviasouz ===
(Kazan, Russia)

- Aviasouz Chemist
- Aviasouz Cruise

=== Aviastroitel ===
- Aviastroitel AC-4 Russia Россия АС-4
- Aviastroitel AC-5M
- Aviastroitel AC-6
- Aviastroitel AC-7
- Aviastroitel AC-7M
- Aviastroitel AC-8

=== Aviasud ===
- Aviasud Albatros
- Aviasud Mistral
- Aviasud Sirocco

=== Aviat ===
(Aviat Aircraft Inc,)

- Aviat 110 Special
- Aviat A-1A
- Aviat A-1B Husky
- Aviat Husky Pup
- Aviat Eagle II
- Aviat S-1
- Aviat S-2
- Aviat Husky

=== Aviata ===
- Aviata GM-1 Gniady

=== Aviate Products ===
(Booysens, South Africa)

- Aviate Raptor

=== Aviatik ===
(Automobil und Aviatik A.G. / Automobil und Aviatikwerke Leipzig-Helterblick)

- Aviatik B.I
- Aviatik B.II (Germany)
- Aviatik B.III
- Aviatik C.I
- Aviatik C.II
- Aviatik C.III
- Aviatik C.V
- Aviatik C.VI
- Aviatik C.VII
- Aviatik C.VIII
- Aviatik C.IX
- Aviatik D.I ( Halberstadt D.II(Av))
- Aviatik D.II
- Aviatik D.III
- Aviatik D.IV
- Aviatik D.V
- Aviatik D.VI
- Aviatik D.VII
- Aviatik G.I
- Aviatik Dr.I
- Aviatik R.III
- Aviatik A 2
- Aviatik F 37
- Aviatik P 1
- Aviatik P 13
- Aviatik P 14
- Aviatik P 15
- Aviatik Doppeldekker Type Militär (P 13)
- Aviatik floatplane
- Aviatik-Farman pusher biplane
- Aviatik-Hanriot monoplane

=== Aviatik (Austro-Hungarian) ===
(Österreichish-Ungarische Flugzeugfabrik Aviatik) Data from:Austro-Hungarian Army Aircraft of World War One

Note: As with other Austro-Hungarian manufacturers, The Austrian Aviatik company was allocated a number series for prototypes and experimental aircraft (series 30). Some of these were actually production aircraft with modifications but most were distinct aircraft or variants. Production Aviatik aircraft delivered to the LFT are disambiguated from German production by the (Ö) or (Berg) qualifier, after Österreich / Oberingenieur Julius von Berg, chief engineer from mid-1916.

- Aviatik 30.03
- Aviatik 30.04
- Aviatik 30.04
- Aviatik 30.06
- Aviatik 30.07 (Gr.I)
- Aviatik 30.08
- Aviatik 30.09
- Aviatik 30.10
- Aviatik 30.04
- Aviatik 30.04
- Aviatik 30.12
- Aviatik 30.13
- Aviatik 30.14 (1st)
- Aviatik 30.14 (2nd)
- Aviatik 30.15
- Aviatik 30.16
- Aviatik 30.17 (Gr.II)
- Aviatik 30.18 (Gr.III)
- Aviatik 30.19
- Aviatik 30.20
- Aviatik 30.21
- Aviatik 30.22
- Aviatik 30.23
- Aviatik 30.24
- Aviatik 30.25
- Aviatik 30.26
- Aviatik 30.27
- Aviatik 30.28
- Aviatik 30.29
- Aviatik 30.30
- Aviatik 30.31
- Aviatik 30.32
- Aviatik 30.33
- Aviatik 30.34
- Aviatik 30.35
- Aviatik 30.36
- Aviatik 30.37
- Aviatik 30.38
- Aviatik 30.39
- Aviatik 30.40
- Aviatik 30.41
- Aviatik 30.42
- Aviatik series 32 (B.II Austro-Hungarian)
- Aviatik series 32.7 (B.II Austro-Hungarian)
- Aviatik series 33 (B.III)
- Aviatik series 34 (B.II Austro-Hungarian)
- Aviatik series 35 (Knoller B.I(Av))
- Aviatik series 36 (Knoller C.II(Av))
- Aviatik series 37 (C.I)
- Aviatik series 38 (D.I)
- Aviatik series 39 (D.II)
- Aviatik series 131 (G.III)
- Aviatik series 132 (B.II)
- Aviatik series 136 (Knoller C.II(Av))
- Aviatik series 137 (C.I)
- Aviatik series 138 (D.I)
- Aviatik series 238 (D.I)
- Aviatik series 338 (D.I)
- Aviatik series 339 (D.II)
- Aviatik (Ö) B.II
- Aviatik (Ö) B.III
- Aviatik (Ö) C.I
- Aviatik (Berg) D.I
- Aviatik (Berg) D.II
- Aviatik (Berg) Dr.I
- Aviatik (Ö) G.III
- Aviatik (Ö) Gr.I

=== Aviatik Alliance ===
- Aviatik Alliance Aleks-251

=== Aviatika ===
(formerly MAI)

- Aviatika-MAI-890
- Aviatika-900 Akrobat
- Aviatika-92

=== Aviation Division ===
(AViacijas DIvizions - Latvia)

- AVDI

=== Aviation Industries of Iran ===
- AII AVA-101
- AII AVA-202
- AII AVA-303

=== Aviation Products ===
(Aviation Products, Ltd, Bitburg, Germany)

- Aviation Products Star Trike

=== Aviation Traders ===
- Aviation Traders Accountant
- Aviation Traders Carvair

=== Aviator ===
(Aviator (aircraft manufacturer) - Russia)

- Aviator Retro
- Aviator Shershen'

=== Avibras ===
(Sociedade Avibras Ltda / Avibras Indústria Aeroespacial)

- Avibras A-80 Falcao

=== AVIC ===
(Avicopter - Avic Helicopter Company)

- AVIC AC311
- AVIC AC313
- AVIC ARJ-21
- AVIC L-15
- AVIC CY-1 is it the missile?
- AVIC Lucky Bird
- AVIC Advanced Heavy Lifter

=== Avicar ===
(Kenneth Bailey, Dearborn, MI)

- Avicar BF-8

=== Avid Aircraft ===
(prev. Light Aero Inc, Caldwell, ID)

- Avid Flyer
- Avid Catalina
- Avid Champion
- Avid Bandit
- Avid MkIV
- Avid Amphibian
- Avid Explorer
- Avid Magnum
- Avid Speedwing

=== Aviméta ===
(Sociéte pour la construction d'avion métallique [issu du groupe Schneider])

- Aviméta 82
- Aviméta 88
- Aviméta 92
- Aviméta 92-230
- Aviméta 121
- Aviméta 132

=== Avimech ===
(Avimech International Aircraft, Inc.)

- Avimech DF-1 Dragonfly

=== Avioane Craiova ===
(Avioane Craiova S.A., Romania)

- Avioane Craiova IAR-93 Vultur
- IAR 95
- IAR 99

=== Avio Design ===
(Avio Design Ltd, Kazanlak, Bulgaria)

- Avio Delta Thruster
- Avio Design Swan I
- Avio Design Swan II

=== Aviones de Colombia ===
- Aviones de Colombia AC-05 Pijao

=== Avions Fairey ===
see also Tipsy

- Avions Fairey Belfair
- Avions Fairey Firefly
- Avions Fairey Fox
- Avions Fairey Junior
- Avions Fairey Tipsy Nipper
- Avions Fairey Tipsy M

=== Avions JDM ===
- JDM Roitelet

=== AvioTecnica ===
- AvioTecnica ES-101 Exec
- AvioTecnica ES-101 Raven

=== Aviotehas ===
(V. Post, R. Neudorf, Estonia)

- Aviotehas PN-3

=== Aviotöökoda ===
(Estonia)

- PON-1 - Post, Org & Neudorf
- PON-1A - Post, Org & Neudorf
- PON-2 - Post, Org & Neudorf
- PTO-4 - Post, Tooma & Org
- RTS-4

=== Avis ===
(Anderlik-Varga-Iskola-Sport)

- AVIS I
- AVIS II
- AVIS III
- AVIS IV

=== AvIS ===
(Avio Industrie Stabiensi)

- AvIS C.4

=== AVPRO ===
(AVPRO U.K. Ltd)

- AVPRO Marauder

=== Avro ===
- Avro 500
- Avro 501
- Avro 502
- Avro 503
- Avro 504
- Avro 508
- Avro 510
- Avro 511
- Avro 514
- Avro 519
- Avro 521
- Avro 523 Pike
- Avro 529
- Avro 530
- Avro 531 Spider
- Avro 533 Manchester
- Avro 534 Baby
- Avro 536
- Avro 538
- Avro 539
- Avro 546
- Avro 547
- Avro 548
- Avro 549 Aldershot
- Avro 551
- Avro 552
- Avro 555 Bison
- Avro 556
- Avro Ava
- Avro 558
- Avro 560
- Avro 561 Andover
- Avro 562 Avis
- Avro 563
- Avro 566 Avenger
- Avro 567 Avenger II
- Avro 571 Buffalo
- Avro 572 Buffalo II
- Avro 581 Avian
- Avro 594 Avian
- Avro 584 Avocet
- Avro 604 Antelope
- Avro 605 Avian
- Avro 608 Hawk
- Avro 581 Avian series
- Avro 618 Ten
- Avro 619 Five
- Avro 621 Tutor
- Avro 622
- Avro 624 Six
- Avro 625 Avian Monoplane
- Avro 626 Prefect
- Avro 627 Mailplane
- Avro 631 Cadet
- Avro 636
- Avro 637
- Avro 638 Club Cadet
- Avro 638 Club Cadet Special
- Avro 639 Cabin Cadet
- Avro 640 Cadet
- Avro 641 Commodore
- Avro 642 Eighteen
- Avro 643 Cadet
- Avro 646 Sea Tutor
- Avro 652A Anson
- Avro 654
- Avro 671 Rota
- Avro 707
- Avro 720
- Avro 730
- Avro 748
- Avro Manchester
- Avro Lancaster
- Avro York
- Avro Tudor
- Avro Lancastrian
- Avro Lincoln
- Avro Lincolnian
- Avro Shackleton
- Avro Vulcan
- Avro Athena
- Avro Ashton
- Avro Mercury
- Avro RJ

=== Avro Canada ===
- Avro Canada CF-100 Canuck
- Avro Canada C-102 Jetliner
- Avro Canada CF-103
- Avro Canada CF-105 Arrow
- Avro Canada VZ-9 AV Avrocar

=== Avro International Aerospace ===
(regional jet division of BAE Systems)

- RJ70
- RJ85
- RJ100

=== Avtek ===
(Avtek Corp, Camarillo, CA)

- Avtek 400A

=== Awuza ===
(Awuza HikoKenkyusho - Awuza Flight Research Studio)

- Awuza (ground taxi-ing) Trainer
- Awuza No.2 Seiho-go

=== AWWA ===
- AWWA Sky Whale

=== Ayaks ===
- Ayaks Concept

=== Aydlett ===
(Donald E Aydlett)

- Aydlett A-1

=== Ayres ===
(Fred Ayres)

- Ayres Let L 610
- Ayres LM200 Loadmaster
- Ayres Thrush
- Ayres Turbo-Thrush

=== Azcárate ===
(Juan F. Azcárate)

- Azcárate E
- Azcárate O-E-1

=== Azalea Aviation ===
(Adel, GA)

- Azalea Saberwing

=== Azionaria Vercelles ===
see:AVIA (Azionaria Vercellese Industrie Aeronautica)

=== Aztec Nomad ===
Heuwiwowie83737374udhdnsn
