= Knoller C.I =

C.I

General information
- Type: Reconnaissance aircraft
- National origin: Austria-Hungary
- Manufacturer: Knoller
- Primary user: KuKLFT
- Number built: 16

History
- First flight: 1916

The Knoller C.I was a reconnaissance aircraft built in Austria-Hungary during World War I for use by the Austro-Hungarian army. It was a conventional biplane design with staggered wings, and seated the pilot and observer in tandem in an open cockpit. The upper wing was swept back.

Production was undertaken at Phönix, but it was built only in small numbers before being supplanted by the Knoller C.II and not all of the examples built were actually flown, with most being placed in storage without engines.

== Variants ==
C.I(Ph) series 25
Production by Phönix Flugzeug-Werke AG, 72 ordered, but only 16 completed.

== Operators ==
Austria-Hungary

- Austro-Hungarian Imperial and Royal Aviation Troops

== Specifications (C.I(Ph)) ==
Data from Austro-Hungarian Army Aircraft of World War One, German & Austro-Hungarian aircraft manufacturers 1908–1918

General characteristics

- Crew: 2
- Length: 8.5 m (27 ft 11 in)
- Wingspan: 12.7 m (41 ft 8 in)
- Height: 3.3 m (10 ft 10 in)
- Wing area: 36 m^{2} (390 sq ft)
- Empty weight: 780 kg (1,720 lb)
- Gross weight: 1,217 kg (2,683 lb)
- Powerplant: 1 × Austro-Daimler 120hp 6-cyl 6-cylinder water-cooled in-line piston engine, 120 kW (160 hp)
- Propellers: 2-bladed fixed pitch propeller

Performance

- Maximum speed: 158–167 km/h (98–104 mph, 85–90 kn)
- Endurance: 3 hours
- Service ceiling: 3,000 m (9,800 ft)
- Time to altitude: 1,000 m (3,300 ft) in 4 minutes 45 seconds

2,000 m (6,600 ft) in 10 minutes 2 seconds
3,000 m (9,800 ft) in 17 minutes 5 seconds
