= Stylus (disambiguation) =

A stylus is a writing implement, or a small tool for some other form of marking or shaping.

Stylus may also refer to:

== Arts, entertainment, and media ==
=== Groups ===
- Stylus (band), Australian soul-pop group
- Stylus, an alias of Point4, a quartet formed in 2001, comprising Pete Day, Phil Dyson, Paul (Bronze) Newton, and Daniel Sherman

=== Periodicals ===
- Stylus Magazine, online music and film magazine launched in 2002
- The Stylus, would-be periodical owned and edited by Edgar Allan Poe
- The Stylus (Brockport), the student weekly newspaper of The college at Brockport, New York
- The Stylus of Boston College, Massachusetts

== Computing and technology ==
- Stylus (browser extension), user style manager
- Stylus (computing), small pen-shaped instrument used to input commands to a computer screen, mobile device or graphics tablet
- Stylus (stylesheet language), computer programming language
- Phonograph stylus, the very small diamond or sapphire tip of a phonograph or record player cartridge (the "needle") used to read gramophone records
- Stylus, Inc., a publisher of Amiga productivity software

== Brands and enterprises ==
- Avama Stylus, a Slovak ultralight aircraft
- Isuzu Stylus, a compact car built by Isuzu
- Stylus Music, an independent British record label from the 1980s
- Stylus Records, a label of Stereophonics

== See also ==
- Stylet (anatomy), an arthropod piercing mouthpart
