= Aviatik (Ö) C.I =

Austo-Hungarian reconnaissance aircraft

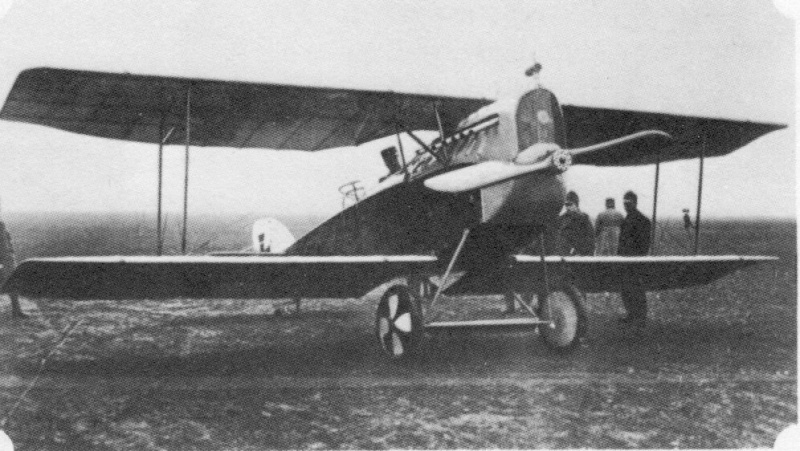

General information
- Type: Reconnaissance aircraft
- National origin: Austria-Hungary
- Manufacturer: Aviatik (Austro-Hungary)
- Number built: 255 ordered

History
- First flight: 1916

The Aviatik C.I, the prototypes of which were known as Aviatik 30.14, Aviatik 30.15 and Aviatik 30.16, was an Austro-Hungarian 2-seat reconnaissance aircraft produced from 1917.(Note: the (Ö) is not part of the designation, but used to disambiguate from the German-built Aviatik aircraft with the same designation.)

== Development ==
Despite the known performance issues with the contemporary production reconnaissance aircraft, (Knoller C.II(Av) among others), development of the C.I was delayed until authorisation was given to proceed on 26 September 1916, when three prototypes were ordered for evaluation. Flight trials of the prototypes were satisfactory and 96 production Aviatik C.I series 37 aircraft were ordered in March 1917.

A relatively conventional aircraft of its day, the C.I followed contemporary practice of a single tractor engine with two cockpits, front for pilot and rear for observer/gunner. Construction was primarily of wood with fabric covered wings and tail but plywood covered fuselage.

Powered by 137.95 kW (185 hp) Austro-Daimler 185hp engines the series 37 aircraft were eagerly awaited by front-line squadrons of the LFT, but disappointment quickly set in as the aircraft failed to meet performance specifications, particularly in rate of climb, and suffered from fragile airframe, not to mention sloppy workmanship. Other issues with photo-reconnaissance aircraft included vibration, causing blurred images, cramped rear cockpit and inability to carry larger cameras than 30 cm (11.8 in) focal length. Even more criticism was levelled on the stability and the cumbersome control wheel for roll control, making the C.I light on the controls and prone to oscillate at the slightest upset.

To alleviate some performance issues the C.I series 137 was developed, powered by a 149.14 kW (200 hp) Austro-Daimler 200hp, but availability of the engine was limited because it was given priority for fighter aircraft. In lieu of the 200 hp engine most 137 series aircraft were fitted with re-furbished 137.95 kW (185 hp) Austro-Daimler 185hp engines. Although generally appreciated by the squadron pilots the 137 series also suffered from the same fragile airframe and shoddy workmanship found in the series 37.

Some C.I aircraft were converted to single-seaters, losing 30 kg (66.14 lb) in weight, armed with two synchronised machine-guns in the fuselage, proving popular due to the increased performance.

== Operational history ==
The three prototypes were evaluated in late 1916 and early 1917, with production aircraft reaching the front in August 1917. Production C.Is were flown by many of the reconnaissance Fliks (Flieger Kompagnien) of the LFT (Luftfahrtruppen), including Fliks 17/D, 21/D, 24/F, and 48/D in the South Tyrol theatre and 2/D, 5/D, 12/Rb, 19/D, 22/D, 23/D, 32, 34/D, 46/P and 58/D on the Isonzo front. The Aviatik C.I was slowly replaced by more capable aircraft from the Spring of 1918.

== Variants ==
30.14
C.I prototype
30.15
C.I prototype
30.16
C.I prototype
30.25
C.I single-seat conversion.
C.I
(series 37 and 137) Production aircraft from Aviatik. Ninety-six were built, including 49 series 37, powered by Austro-Daimler 185hp engines and 40 series 137, Austro-Daimler 200hp engines delivered to front-line units.
C.I(Lo)
(series 114 and 214) Production by Lohner to a contract for 50 aircraft, 32x C.I(Lo) series 114, powered by Austro-Daimler 185hp engines and 18x C.I(Lo) series 214, powered by Austro-Daimler 200hp engines, originally 24 and 26 respectively.
C.I(MAG)
(series 91) Production by MAG, 24x series 91 aircraft.
C.I(WKF)
(series 83) Production aircraft from WKF, 40x series 83 aircraft.
C.I(Ll)
(series 47) Production aircraft built by Lloyd, 45x series 47 aircraft.

== Operators ==
Austria-Hungary

- Austro-Hungarian Imperial and Royal Aviation Troops

== Specifications (C.I series 37) ==
Data from Austro-Hungarian Army Aircraft of World War One

General characteristics

- Crew: 1
- Length: 6.86 m (22 ft 6 in)
- Upper wingspan: 8.4 m (27 ft 7 in)
- Lower wingspan: 8.25 m (27 ft 1 in)
- Height: 2.26 m (7 ft 5 in)
- Wing area: 24.8 m^{2} (267 sq ft)
- Empty weight: 653 kg (1,440 lb)
- Gross weight: 976 kg (2,152 lb)
- Powerplant: 1 × Austro-Daimler 6 water-cooled, straight six piston engine, 138 kW (185 hp)
- Propellers: 2-bladed fixed-pitch wooden propeller

Performance

- Maximum speed: 178 km/h (111 mph, 96 kn)
- Time to altitude: 1,000 m (3,280.8 ft) - 3 min 52 sec
- Wing loading: 39.0 kg/m^{2} (8.0 lb/sq ft)
- Power/mass: 0.14 kW/kg (0.08 hp/lb)

Armament

- Guns:

- 1 × 8 mm (0.315 in) Schwarzlose machine gun mounted over the centre section fixed to fire upwards at 15°
- 1 × manually aimed 8 mm (0.315 in) Schwarzlose machine gun on a turret ring in the rear cockpit.

== Bibliography ==
- Grosz, Peter Michael; Haddow, George & Schiemer, Peter (1993). Austro-Hungarian Army Aircraft of World War One. Mountain View, California: Flying Machines Press. ISBN 0-9637110-0-8.
