= Arnold AR-6 =

Aircraft Model

General information
- Type: Monoplane
- National origin: United States
- Designer: Mike Arnold
- Built by: David Hoover, Mike Arnold, Craig Catto, Robby Grove, Steve Hill
- Primary user: Private
- Number built: 1

History
- First flight: March 11, 2005
- Developed from: Arnold AR-5

The Arnold AR-6 is a single seat low wing monoplane racing aircraft.

== Development ==
Designed by Mike Arnold, who also created the fuselage plug. Mike is known for his original record-setting AR-5 and accompanying video series.

=== Design ===
The AR-6 is a one of a kind racing aircraft built primarily of composite materials, Including extensive use of carbon fiber. Powered by a Continental O-200 Engine, built to compete in the Formula One category at the Reno Air Races. It was designed to comply with the "Formula" Rules, which limit engine displacement, propeller type, wing area, minimum aircraft weight, and landing gear type. The Aircraft is also Eligible for International Air Racing.

== Racing career ==
"Endeavor" was originally built and raced by David Hoover, and first flew on March 11, 2005. The aircraft, piloted by Hoover, placed first in the Formula One Gold event in 2007.

The aircraft was later sold to Steve Senegal, who placed First in Gold 2008, 2010, 2012, 2014, and 2015.

While qualifying for the 2014 Reno Races, AR-6 "Endeavor" piloted by Senegal, set the IF1 record of 267.289 mph flying the 3.1875 mile oval track in 42.931 seconds. Prior to this, Senegal set the race heat record of 260.775mph on Wednesday, September 12, 2012.

=== Incidents ===
The aircraft was damaged in an air racing accident during the 2016 Reno Air Races. It was subsequently repaired.

== AR-6 Specifications ==
Data from Experimental Aircraft Association Inc., Airport-Data.com, Today's Pilot, March 2006

General characteristics

- Crew: 1
- Capacity: 2
- Wingspan: 24.3 ft (7.4 m)
- Wing area: 66.0 sq ft (6.13 m^{2})
- Aspect ratio: 8.95
- Empty weight: 600 lb (272 kg)
- Fuel capacity: 5.4 gal.
- Powerplant: 1 × O-200 Continental Reciprocating, 100 hp (75 kW) (100hp at 2,750rpm, Race: 4,400rpm)
- Propellers: 2-bladed carbon-fiber, 4.5 ft × 5.67 ft (1.37 m × 1.73 m) diameter

Performance

- Maximum speed: 310 mph (500 km/h, 270 kn) at 3,000 feet MSL
- Stall speed: 63 mph (102 km/h, 55 kn)
- g limits: +6/-4
- Wing loading: 13.0 lb/sq ft (63 kg/m^{2})
