= AVIC Lucky Bird =

Chinese ultralight trike

Lucky Bird

General information
- Type: Ultralight trike
- National origin: China
- Manufacturer: Aviation Industry Corporation of China
- Status: Under development (2013)

The AVIC Lucky Bird (Chinese: Jixiangniao) is a Chinese ultralight trike, under development by Aviation Industry Corporation of China. The aircraft is envisioned for the police, border patrol, traffic and pollution surveillance, reconnaissance, aerial photography, forest fire patrol and touring roles.

== Design and development ==
The aircraft has been noted as unusual due to its national origin and also being the project of a large state-run aviation company that also produces fighters and jet transport aircraft.

Very little technical data has been released about the Lucky Bird to date. It is known that it features a cable-braced hang glider-style high-wing, weight-shift controls, a two-seats-in-tandem open cockpit, tricycle landing gear with wheel pants and a single engine in pusher configuration. A three-seat version is also being developed.

The aircraft resembles most western-designed trikes. It is made from bolted-together aluminium tubing, with its double surface wing covered in Dacron sailcloth. Its wing is supported by a single tube-type kingpost and uses an "A" frame weight-shift control bar. The powerplant is an Austrian-made four cylinder, air and liquid-cooled, four-stroke, dual-ignition 80 hp (60 kW) Rotax 912 engine.

== Specifications (Lucky Bird) ==
Data from Bayerl

General characteristics

- Crew: one
- Capacity: one or two passengers
- Powerplant: 1 × Rotax 912UL four cylinder, liquid and air-cooled, four stroke aircraft engine, 60 kW (80 hp)
- Propellers: 3-bladed composite
