= Astra-Paulhan flying boat =

General information
- Type: Flying boat
- National origin: France
- Manufacturer: Société Astra des Constructions Aéronautiques
- Number built: 1

History
- First flight: 1919

The Astra-Paulhan flying boat was designed and built in the latter stages of WWI and was tested at the Marine Nationale seaplane base at Saint-Raphaël, Var in 1919. No information is available other than it was a biplane with twin fuselages between the wings and a central flying boat hull suspended from the lower wing, powered by two water-cooled engines in the noses of the fuselages.

== Specifications ==
Data from French aircraft of the First World War

- Powerplant: 2 × unknown water-cooled piston engines
- Propellers: 2-bladed fixed-pitch propellers
