= Anderson Z =

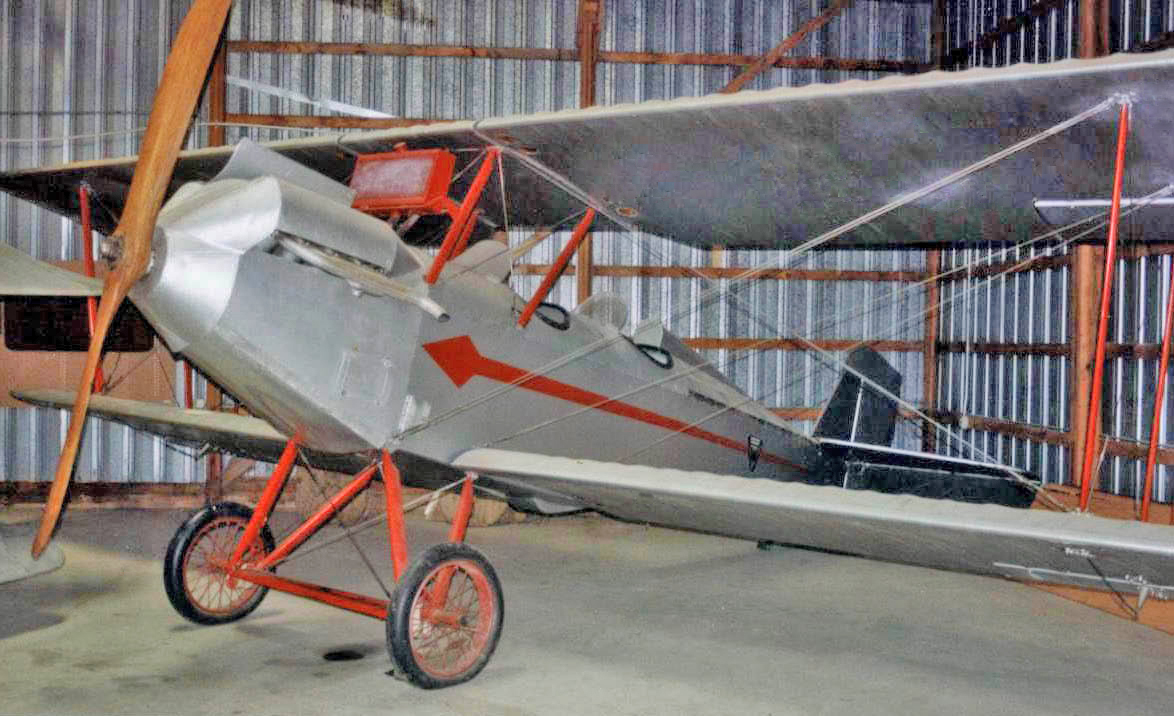
- The sole Anderson Z is preserved and on display at the Airpower Museum at Blakesburg, Iowa.

General information
- Type: Light biplane
- National origin: United States
- Manufacturer: Andrew A. Anderson
- Designer: Vernon Slorby
- Status: sole example is preserved
- Primary user: the builder
- Number built: 1

History
- Introduction date: 1932
- First flight: 1932

The Anderson Z is an early 1930s American-designed single-engine biplane.

== Development ==
The Model Z was designed and built by a self-taught "Flying Farmer", Andrew A. Anderson of Hawley, Minnesota and Rollag, Minnesota. It is of typical biplane layout, with the upper wing supported by cabane struts from the forward fuselage, and these also house the air-cooled radiator. The tailplane is high-set on the rear fuselage and the two seats are housed in separate open cockpits. The undercarriage is fixed and unsprung. The powerplant is a Curtiss OX-5 of 90 hp (67 kW).

== Operational history ==
The aircraft was flown by Anderson during the early 1930s, but was retired before World War II. It was discovered in a dismantled state in 1977 and was acquired by the Antique Airplane Association (AAA) who restored it for display. It is now (2009) owned by the Airpower Museum based at the Antique Airfield near Blakesburg, Iowa. It last taxied under its own power during the 1994 AAA fly-in.

== Specifications ==
Data from Aerofiles

General characteristics

- Crew: 1
- Capacity: 1 passenger
- Length: 22 ft 6 in (6.86 m)
- Wingspan: 30 ft 0 in (9.14 m)
- Powerplant: 1 × Curtiss OX-5 piston, 90 hp (67 kW)
- Propellers: 2-bladed
