= Astra 1916 bomber =

General information
- Type: Bomber
- National origin: France
- Manufacturer: Société de Constructions Aéronautiques Astra
- Number built: 1

The Astra 1916 bomber was a large 3-engined biplane, with two fuselages and a central nacelle. Power was supplied by three 220 hp (160 kW) Renault 12Eb water-cooled V-12 piston engines, two tractor engines in the noses of the fuselages and a pusher engine at the rear of the central nacelle. The flight crew of two sat in individual cockpits in the central nacelle and a gunner were housed in a cockpit, aft of the wings, in each fuselage. Designed for a 1916 concours puissant the performance of the aircraft was unsatisfactory and further development was abandoned.

== Specifications ==
Data from French aircraft of the First World War

General characteristics

- Crew: 4
- Length: 14.2 m (46 ft 7 in)
- Wingspan: 25.5 m (83 ft 8 in)
- Wing area: 140 m^{2} (1,500 sq ft)
- Empty weight: 2,300 kg (5,071 lb)
- Gross weight: 3,500 kg (7,716 lb)
- Powerplant: 3 × Renault 12Eb water-cooled V-12 piston engines, 160 kW (220 hp) each
- Propellers: 2-bladed tractor and pusher propellers

Performance

- Maximum speed: 125 km/h (78 mph, 67 kn)
- Service ceiling: 3,800 m (12,500 ft)
- Time to altitude: 2,000 m (6,600 ft) in 24 minutes

Armament

- Guns: 3 machine-guns in the forward cockpit of the central nacelle and one each in the gunners cockpits of the laft and right fuselages.
