= Aviatik (Berg) D.II =

General information
- Type: Fighter
- National origin: Austria-Hungary
- Manufacturer: Aviatik
- Primary user: Austro-Hungarian Imperial and Royal Aviation Troops
- Number built: 13

History
- First flight: summer 1917
- Developed from: Aviatik (Berg) D.I

The Aviatik (Berg) D.II, the prototypes of which were known as Aviatik 30.22 and Aviatik 30.38, was an Austro-Hungarian sesquiplane fighter aircraft prototype towards the end of the First World War.

== Development ==
The D.II's fuselage was virtually identical to that of the D.I. It was characterised, however, by its short-span, cantilever lower wing, which made it a sesquiplane. Through 1917, 19 D.IIs were built for front-line evaluation. The series 39 aircraft were powered by the 150 kW (200 hp) Austro-Daimler 6 engine and the series 339 aircraft by the more powerful 168 kW (225 hp) Austro-Daimler 6 engine driving a four-bladed Jaray propeller and armed with the usual paired 8 mm (0.315 in) Schwarzlose machine guns. A further prototype, (30.38), was produced by fitting a 150 kW (200 hp) Hiero engine in a D.II airframe.

== Operational history ==
The first three production aircraft were tested in November 1917, and seven were evaluated at the front later in that year, showing good promise. However, the decision was made that Aviatik should instead produce the Fokker D.VII, and any plans to continue production of the D.II were halted.

== Operators ==
=== Austria-Hungary ===
- Austro-Hungarian Imperial and Royal Aviation Troops

=== Kingdom of Yugoslavia ===
- Yugoslav Royal Air Force - Postwar

== Specifications (D.II series 39) ==
Data from Austro-Hungarian Army Aircraft of World War One

General characteristics

- Crew: 1
- Length: 6.98 m (22 ft 11 in)
- Upper wingspan: 7.5 m (24 ft 7 in)
- Lower wingspan: 5.2 m (17 ft 1 in)
- Height: 2.45 m (8 ft 0 in)
- Wing area: 19.5 m^{2} (210 sq ft)
- Gross weight: 845 kg (1,863 lb)
- Powerplant: 1 × Austro-Daimler 6 water-cooled, straight six piston engine, 150 kW (200 hp)

Performance

- Maximum speed: 217 km/h (135 mph, 117 kn)
- Time to altitude:

- 1,000 m (3,300 ft) - 3 minutes 5 seconds
- 2,000 m (6,600 ft) - 6 minutes 2 seconds
- 3,000 m (9,800 ft) - 10 minutes 55 seconds
- 4,000 m (13,000 ft) - 18 minutes 7 seconds

Armament

- Guns: 2 x 8 mm (0.315 in) Schwarzlose machine guns
