= Arey Tatush =

Russian paramotor

Tatush

General information
- Type: Paramotor
- National origin: Russia
- Manufacturer: Arey
- Status: Production completed

The Arey Tatush is a Russian paramotor that was designed and produced by Arey of Krasnoyarsk for powered paragliding. Now out of production, when it was available the aircraft was supplied complete and ready-to-fly.

== Design and development ==
The Tatush was designed to comply with the US FAR 103 Ultralight Vehicles rules as well as European regulations. It features a paraglider-style wing, single-place accommodation and a single engine in pusher configuration with a 124 cm (49 in) diameter two-bladed wooden propeller.

The base model T120M uses the inexpensive 16 hp (12 kW) Russian-made Arey A-170 in-house engine, although options include the 24 hp (18 kW) Hirth F33 and the 16 hp (12 kW) Solo 210 on upgraded models.

As is the case with all paramotors, take-off and landing is accomplished by foot. Inflight steering is accomplished via handles that actuate the canopy brakes, creating roll and yaw.

== Variants ==
Tatush T120M
Model with a Russian-made 16 hp (12 kW) Arey A-170 engine with a 2.5:1 ratio reduction drive and a 124 cm (49 in) diameter two-bladed wooden propeller. The fuel tank capacity is 5 litres (1.1 imp gal; 1.3 US gal) or optionally 8 litres (1.8 imp gal; 2.1 US gal).
Tatush T210S
Model with a 16 hp (12 kW) Solo 210 engine with a 2.5:1 ratio reduction drive and a 124 cm (49 in) diameter two-bladed wooden propeller. The fuel tank capacity is 11 litres (2.4 imp gal; 2.9 US gal).
Tatush T300
Model with a 24 hp (18 kW) Hirth F33 engine with a 1.9:1 ratio reduction drive and a 124 cm (49 in) diameter two-bladed wooden propeller. The fuel tank capacity is 8 litres (1.8 imp gal; 2.1 US gal).
Telezhka
A powered parachute design, in the form of a lightweight wheel set to be combined with the Tatush.

== Specifications (Tatush T120M) ==
Data from Bertrand

General characteristics

- Crew: one
- Empty weight: 27 kg (60 lb)
- Fuel capacity: 5 litres (1.1 imp gal; 1.3 US gal), optionally 8 litres (1.8 imp gal; 2.1 US gal)
- Powerplant: 1 × Arey A-170 single cylinder, two-stroke, air-cooled aircraft engine, with a 2.5:1 reduction drive, 12 kW (16 hp)
- Propellers: 2-bladed wooden, 1.24 m (4 ft 1 in) diameter
