= Australian Aircraft Kits Wasp =

General information
- Type: Ultralight aircraft
- National origin: Australia
- Manufacturer: Australian Aircraft Kits
- Status: In production

The Australian Aircraft Kits Wasp is an Australian ultralight aircraft, designed and produced by Australian Aircraft Kits. The aircraft is supplied as a kit for amateur construction.

== Design and development ==
Designed for flight training and personal use, the Wasp features a strut-braced shoulder-wing, a two-seats-in-side-by-side configuration enclosed cockpit, fixed tricycle landing gear and a single engine in tractor configuration.

The aircraft is made from aluminium all-metal construction. Its 8.9 m (29.2 ft) span wing is supported a single strut per side. The standard engine is the 100 hp (75 kW) Rotax 912ULS four-stroke powerplant.

Construction from the factory kit takes 300 hours.

== Specifications (Wasp) ==
Data from Bayerl

General characteristics

- Crew: one
- Capacity: one passenger
- Wingspan: 8.9 m (29 ft 2 in)
- Wing area: 12.1 m^{2} (130 sq ft)
- Empty weight: 320 kg (705 lb)
- Gross weight: 544 kg (1,199 lb)
- Fuel capacity: 100 litres (22 imp gal; 26 US gal)
- Powerplant: 1 × Rotax 912ULS four cylinder, liquid and air-cooled, four stroke aircraft engine, 75 kW (101 hp)

Performance

- Maximum speed: 180 km/h (110 mph, 97 kn)
- Cruise speed: 155 km/h (96 mph, 84 kn)
- Stall speed: 65 km/h (40 mph, 35 kn)
- Rate of climb: 5.5 m/s (1,080 ft/min)
- Wing loading: 44.95 kg/m^{2} (9.21 lb/sq ft)
