= Australian Aircraft Kits =

Australian aircraft manufacturer

Australian Aircraft Kits Pty Ltd
- Company type: Privately held company
- Industry: Aerospace
- Founded: 2003
- Headquarters: Taree, New South Wales, Australia
- Key people: Principal: Ole Hartmann
- Products: Kit aircraft
- Website: www.aircraftkits.com.au

Australian Aircraft Kits Pty Ltd is an Australian aircraft manufacturer based in Taree, New South Wales, that was established in 2003. The company principal is Ole Hartmann.

The company specializes in the design and manufacture of light aircraft in the form of kits for amateur construction and ready-to-fly aircraft in the light-sport aircraft category. The company also does aircraft repair work on homebuilt aircraft.

The company produces four aircraft, the high-wing two-seat Hornet STOL, Hornet Cub and Bushman, plus the shoulder-wing Wasp. The Hornet STOL was named Most Innovative Ultralight Design in 2004 at Narromine.

== Aircraft ==
Summary of aircraft built by Australian Aircraft Kits
Model name	First flight	Number built	Type
Australian Aircraft Kits Hornet STOL	2004		Two seat, side-by-side configuration, high-wing STOL aircraft
Australian Aircraft Kits Hornet Cub			Two seat, tandem high-wing STOL aircraft
Australian Aircraft Kits Bushman			Two seat, tandem, high-wing STOL aircraft
Australian Aircraft Kits Wasp			Two seat, side-by-side configuration, shoulder-wing aircraft
