= Avia B.122 =

B.122
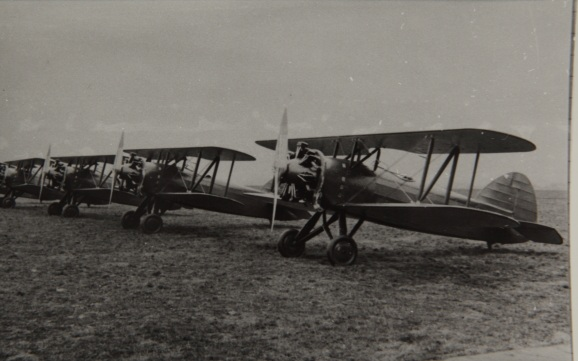
- Series of Ba.122s for Soviet Union

General information
- Type: aerobatic trainer aircraft
- Manufacturer: Avia
- Designer: František Novotný
- Primary users: Czechoslovak Air Force Slovak Air Force; Soviet Air Forces; Luftwaffe

History
- First flight: 1934

The Avia B.122 was a Czechoslovak single-seat biplane aerobatic aircraft, developed in the mid-1930s. It saw some service in the first years of World War II.

== History ==
In the spring of 1934, the Czechoslovak Army Command decided that some Czechoslovak Air Force pilots would participate in the international aerobatic competition Coupe Mondiale held at Vincennes, Paris, on 9–10 June. For this purpose, the Czechoslovak aircraft manufacturer Avia was given the task of designing and constructing an aircraft. The prototype, B.122, was presented after only six weeks.

The Czechoslovak pilots had only a few weeks to learn and master the aircraft as the competition was to be held in July 1934. Luckily, the design was quite successful and the Czechoslovak pilots managed to win the 4th (František Novák) and the 8th (Ján Ambruš) place in the competition.

Afterwards, the aircraft was modified, based on the pilots' inputs, and this resulted in the improved version, Ba.122. The Ba.122 was equipped with larger rudder and ailerons on both upper and lower wings. On the occasion of 1936 Summer Olympics in Berlin International Aerobatic Contest, "Internationaler Kunstflugwettbewerbs" was run by the German Aeroculub, "Aeroklub von Deutschland". Czechoslovak pilots won 2nd (Petr Široký), 3rd (František Novák) and 8th place (Ján Ambruš) with their Avias. In this contest new engine Avia RK-17 was introduced, with aircraft Ba.122.7 (OK-AWE), Ba.122.8 (OK-AWA). 1937 was also a successful year, as the Avias managed to win 1st and 3rd place at the International Aviation Meeting in Zurich in July/August 1937. Some of these aircraft were equipped with nine-cylinder Walter Pollux engines to fit into category of aeroplanes with engines above 20L. These successes led to export orders from the Soviet Union and Romania. The aircraft was later further developed into prototypes Ba.222, Ba.322 and Ba.422. The Czechoslovak Ministry of Defence ordered 45 Bs.122 trainers. However, the outbreak of World War II put an end to further development. Some Avias ended up in the German Luftwaffe when parts of Czechoslovakia were absorbed into Nazi Germany in 1939. Other aircraft were sold to the Slovak and Bulgarian air forces.

== Variants ==
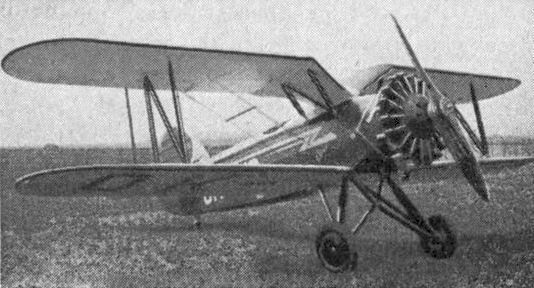
Avia B.422 photo from L'Aerophile May 1938

B.122
3 prototype machines with Walter Castor II engine, B-122.2 and .3 later modified to Ba.122 standard
Ba.122
improved variant with ailerons on both wings and enlarged rudder, mostly with Avia RK-17 engine
Ba.222
Ba.122 with NACA cowling and wheel pants
Ba.422
Ba.122 with upper gull wing to improve front visibility in inverted flight
Bš.122
Military trainer variant of the Ba.122, staggered wings, Walter Castor II engine
B.322
Bš-122 with enclosed cockpit and Townend cowling

== Production ==
- B/Ba.122: 60 machines, serials B.122.1-Ba.122.45, Ba.122.101-115 (series for Soviet Union)
- Bš.122: 45 machines
- Ba.222: one prototype
- Ba.322: one prototype
- Ba.422: 2 machines

== Operators ==
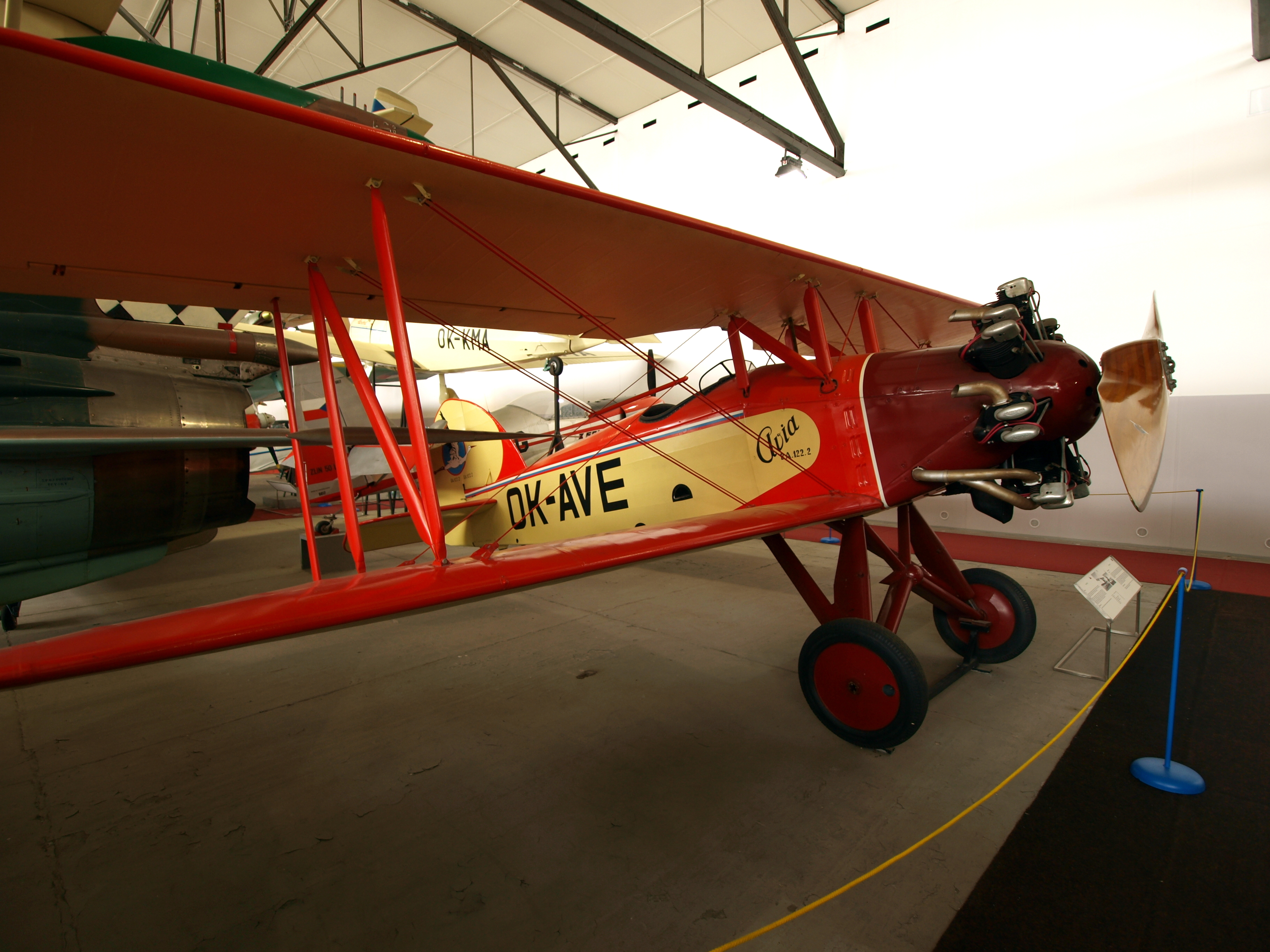
Avia Ba-122 (OK-AVE)

Bulgaria
Bulgarian Air Force – 12 Bs 122 aircraft taken over from the Czechoslovak Air Force, named ″Vosa″ (″Wasp″)
Czechoslovakia
Czechoslovak Air Force – 45 Bš.122 and 45 B/Ba.122 aircraft
Germany
Luftwaffe – 12 aircraft taken over from the Czechoslovak Air Force
Romania
Royal Romanian Air Force – one machine, Ba-122.40, YR-DPO
Slovakia
Slovak Air Force (1939–1945)
Soviet Union
Soviet Air Force – 15 Ba.122 aircraft

== Specifications (Ba.122) ==
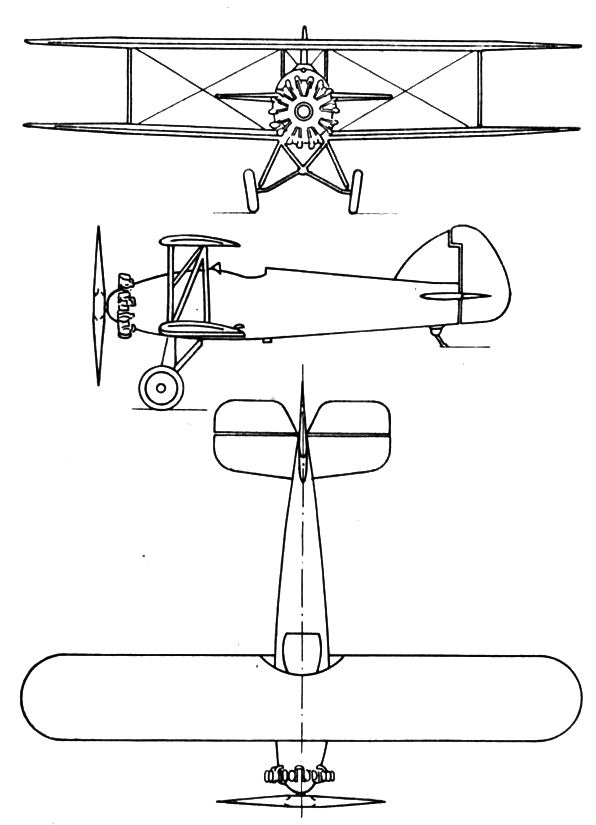
Avia B.122 3-view drawing L'Aerophile April 1937

Data from Němeček, Václav – Československá letadla

- Crew: 1
- Length: 6.80 m (22 ft 4 in)
- Wingspan: 8.85 m (29 ft 0 in)
- Height: 2.84 m (9 ft 4 in)
- Wing area: 22.55 m^{2} (242.7 sq ft)
- Airfoil: Clark Y
- Empty weight: 780 kg (1,720 lb)
- Gross weight: 1,080 kg (2,381 lb)
- Powerplant: 1 × Avia RK-17, 310 kW (420 hp)

Performance

- Maximum speed: 270 km/h (168 mph, 146 kn)
- Cruise speed: 230 km/h (143 mph, 124 kn)
- Range: 575 km (357 mi, 310 nmi)
- Service ceiling: 7,000 m (22,300 ft)
- g limits: +18,-12 ultimate
- Time to altitude: 6 min to 10,000ft
- Power/mass: 3,5 kg/kW, 5,66 lbs/hp

== See also ==
- List of Interwar military aircraft
