= Apex Eco 6 =

General information
- Type: Ultralight trike
- National origin: Czech Republic
- Manufacturer: To-Mi Aviation; Apex Aviation
- Status: Production completed

The Apex Eco 6 is the first of a family of Czech single and two seat flying wing ultralight trikes that were designed and produced by To-Mi Aviation and later by Apex Aviation. The aircraft were supplied as kits for amateur construction.

== Design and development ==
The single seat Eco 6 was designed to comply with the US FAR 103 Ultralight Vehicles rules, including the category's maximum empty weight of 254 lb (115 kg). It features a cable-braced hang glider-style high-wing, weight-shift controls, a single-seat, open cockpit, tricycle landing gear and a single engine in pusher configuration.

The aircraft is made from bolted-together aluminum tubing with steel brackets, with its single surface wing covered in Dacron sailcloth. Its 9.60 m (31.5 ft) span wing is supported by a single tube-type kingpost and uses an "A" frame control bar. A variety of single-surfaced wings can be used on the Eco 6, with wing areas ranging from 14.0 to 16.1 m^{2} (151 to 173 sq ft). The Eco 6 had a factory option of a Galaxy ballistic parachute. The standard engine supplied was the 30 kW (40 hp) Rotax 447.

Developed from the Eco 6 were two two-seat models, the Dolphin 3 and the Cross 5. The three aircraft line commenced production in the mid-1980s and was introduced into the United States in 1997, represented in the US by AKS of Portland, Oregon.

== Operational history ==
The Cross 5 model was supplied to the Czech Air Force.

== Variants ==
Eco 6
Single-seat model with a Rotax 447 engine of 30 kW (40 hp) or a Rotax 503 engine of 37 kW (50 hp). Acceptable power range is 34 to 48 kW (46 to 64 hp). Fifteen had been completed and flown by February 2000.
Dolphin 3
Two-seat tandem model with a useful load of 319 kg (703 lb), powered by a Rotax 503 engine of 37 kW (50 hp), a 48 kW (64 hp) Rotax 582 or SVS-1400 engine
Cross 5
Two-seat tandem model with a steel tube frame and a gross weight of 450 kg (992 lb). Can accept any engine under 75 kg (165 lb) in weight, including the 45 kW (60 hp) Zanzottera MZ 201. Fifteen had been completed and flown by February 2000. Construction time from the kit was reported as 100 hours.
Cross 5x
Version of the Cross 5 with higher and wider seats

== Specifications (Eco 6) ==
Data from Cliche and Kitplanes

General characteristics

- Crew: one
- Length: 1.98 m (6 ft 6 in)
- Wingspan: 9.60 m (31 ft 6 in)
- Height: 2.4 m (8 ft)
- Wing area: 15 m^{2} (160 sq ft) typical wing fitted
- Empty weight: 32 kg (70.5 lb) plus wing and engine
- Gross weight: 215 kg (475 lb)
- Fuel capacity: 17 litres (3.7 imp gal; 4.5 US gal)
- Powerplant: 1 × Rotax 503 twin cylinder, two-stroke aircraft engine, 37 kW (50 hp)

Performance

- Cruise speed: 56 km/h (35 mph, 30 kn)
- Range: 140 km (90 mi, 78 nmi)
- Rate of climb: 4.8 m/s (950 ft/min)
