= Australian Aircraft Kits Hornet STOL =

General information
- Type: Ultralight aircraft
- National origin: Australia
- Manufacturer: Australian Aircraft Kits
- Status: In production

History
- Introduction date: 2004

The Australian Aircraft Kits Hornet STOL is an Australian ultralight aircraft, designed and produced by Australian Aircraft Kits and introduced in 2004. The aircraft is supplied as a kit for amateur construction or as a complete ready-to-fly-aircraft.

== Design and development ==
Designed for STOL operations in the Australian outback and cattle mustering, the Hornet STOL features a strut-braced high-wing, a two-seats-in-side-by-side configuration enclosed cockpit, fixed conventional landing gear and a single engine in tractor configuration.

The aircraft is made from aluminium all-metal construction. Its 8.9 m (29.2 ft) span wing employs flaps and is supported by V-struts with jury struts. Standard engines available are the 100 hp (75 kW) Rotax 912ULS, 115 hp (86 kW) Rotax 914, but the 110 hp (82 kW) Rotec R2800 radial engine or the 150 hp (112 kW) Lycoming O-320 four-stroke powerplants can be fitted. Tundra tires are usually fitted for off-airport operations.

== Specifications (Hornet STOL) ==
Data from Bayerl

General characteristics

- Crew: one
- Capacity: one passenger
- Wingspan: 8.9 m (29 ft 2 in)
- Wing area: 11.9 m^{2} (128 sq ft)
- Empty weight: 330 kg (728 lb)
- Gross weight: 600 kg (1,323 lb)
- Fuel capacity: 80 litres (18 imp gal; 21 US gal)
- Powerplant: 1 × Rotax 912ULS four cylinder, liquid and air-cooled, four stroke aircraft engine, 75 kW (101 hp)

Performance

- Maximum speed: 180 km/h (110 mph, 97 kn)
- Cruise speed: 140 km/h (87 mph, 76 kn)
- Stall speed: 65 km/h (40 mph, 35 kn)
- Rate of climb: 5.6 m/s (1,100 ft/min)
- Wing loading: 50.42 kg/m^{2} (10.33 lb/sq ft)
