= JDM Roitelet =

1949 French homebuilt aircraft

Roitelet

General information
- Type: Sports aircraft
- Manufacturer: Homebuilt

History
- First flight: 3 January 1949

The JDM Roitelet (French: "Wren") was a single-seat light aircraft marketed in France by Avions JDM shortly after World War II. However, only a single example (the prototype, registration F-WFAC) is known to have been built. It was a low-wing, open cockpit monoplane with tailskid undercarriage.

== Specifications ==
General characteristics

- Crew: one pilot
- Length: 4.15 m (13 ft 7 in)
- Wingspan: 6.95 m (22 ft 10 in)
- Empty weight: 105 kg (230 lb)
- Gross weight: 210 kg (460 lb)
- Powerplant: 1 × Poinsard 25hp 2-cyl piston engine , 19 kW (25 hp)

Performance

- Maximum speed: 155 km/h (97 mph, 84 kn)
- Range: 340 km (210 mi, 180 nmi)

== Avions JDM ==
Avions JDM (from "Jean Dabos et Masclet") was a French aircraft manufacturer established in Neuilly-sur-Seine shortly after World War II to market the Roitelet for homebuilding. However, the aircraft did not sell.

== Bibliography ==
- aviafrance.com
- luftfahrt-archiv.de
- aviafrance.com
