= Astoux-Védrines Triplane =

General information
- Type: Triplane
- National origin: France
- Designer: L.L. Astoux
- Number built: 1

History
- First flight: ~ 1917/1918

The Astoux-Védrines Triplane was a triplane fighter prototype designed and built in France during World War I. Powered by a 130 hp (97 kW) Clerget 9B rotary engine, the triplane was destroyed during flight testing and further development was abandoned. Very little else is known, other than that the name came from the designer, L. L. Astoux and the pilot Jules Védrines. After initial flights by monsieur Verdrines another pilot, a monsieur Simon, was flying the aircraft when the aircraft was destroyed in a crash.

== Specifications ==
Data from French aircraft of the First World War

General characteristics

- Crew: 1
- Powerplant: 1 × Clerget 9B 9-cylinder air-cooled rotary piston engine, 97 kW (130 hp)
- Propellers: 2-bladed fixed-pitch propeller

Performance
