= Australian Aircraft Kits Bushman =

General information
- Type: Ultralight aircraft
- National origin: Australia
- Manufacturer: Australian Aircraft Kits
- Status: In production

The Australian Aircraft Kits Bushman is an Australian ultralight aircraft, designed and produced by Australian Aircraft Kits. The aircraft is supplied as a kit for amateur construction.

== Design and development ==
Designed for STOL operations in the Australian outback and cattle mustering, the Bushman features a strut-braced high-wing, a two-seats-in-tandem enclosed cockpit, fixed conventional landing gear and a single engine in tractor configuration.

The aircraft is made from aluminium all-metal construction. Its 9 m (29.5 ft) span wing employs flaps and is supported by V-struts with jury struts. The standard engine is the 115 hp (86 kW) Rotax 914 four-stroke powerplant. The landing gear is of a trailing idler-link design. Tundra tires are usually fitted for off-airport operations.

== Specifications (Bushman) ==
Data from Bayerl

General characteristics

- Crew: one
- Capacity: one passenger
- Wingspan: 9 m (29 ft 6 in)
- Empty weight: 310 kg (683 lb)
- Gross weight: 600 kg (1,323 lb)
- Powerplant: 1 × Rotax 914 four cylinder, liquid and air-cooled, turbocharged four stroke aircraft engine, 86 kW (115 hp)
- Propellers: 3-bladed composite
