= Australian Autogyro =

The Australian Autogyro Company was an Australian aircraft manufacturer founded by Ted Minty in Turramurra, New South Wales to market the Skyhook autogyro of his design. Aircraft were offered in kit form, or fully assembled.
