= Andrews A1 =

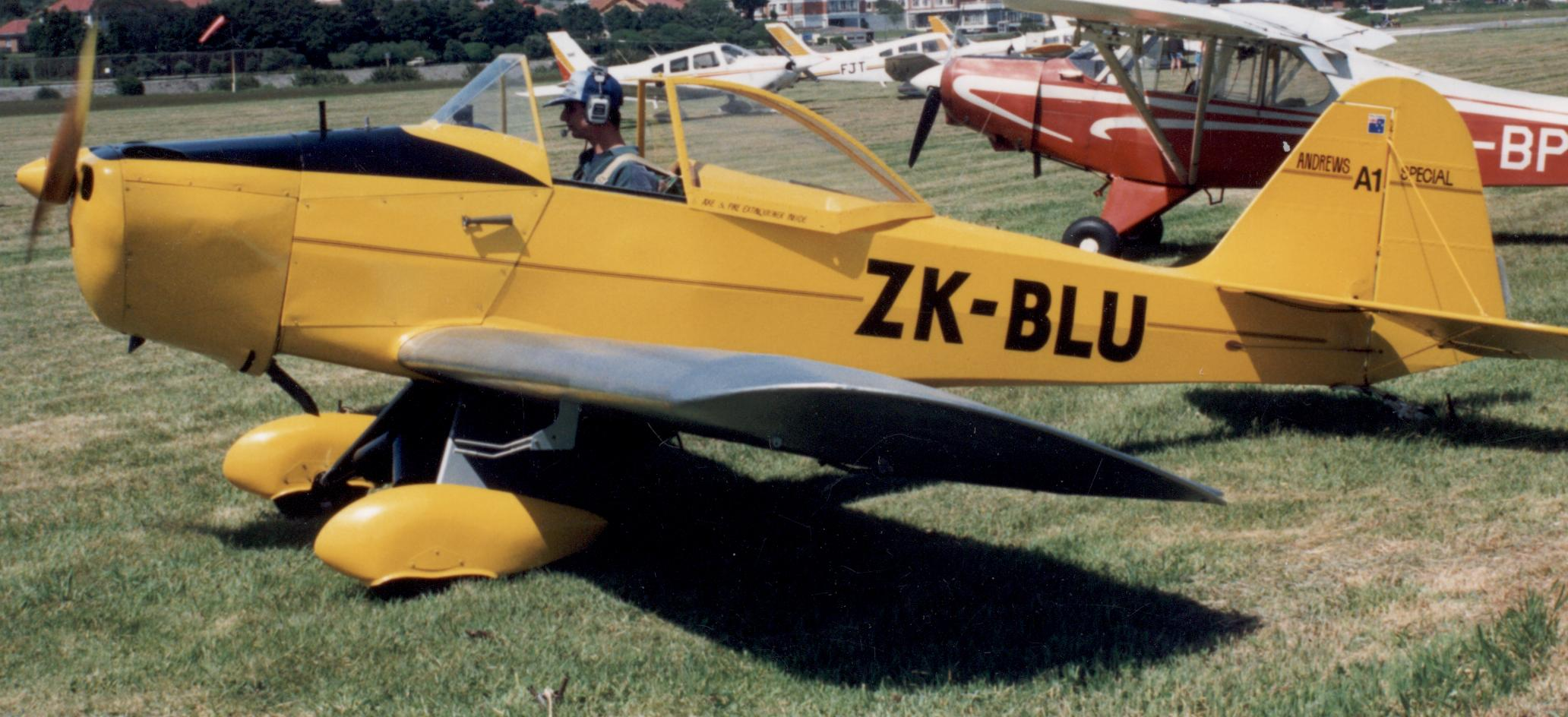
- The Andrews A1 in 1992

General information
- Type: scale flying test-bed
- National origin: New Zealand
- Designer: C.G. Andrews
- Number built: 1

History
- First flight: 1957
- Developed from: Andrews A2

The Andrews A1 is a 1950s New Zealand monoplane.

== Development ==
C.G. Andrews was an aeronautical engineer based in Wellington, New Zealand. The Andrews A1 was built as a half-scale flying test aircraft for a proposed agricultural aircraft, known as the A2, that Andrews designed for use in New Zealand's aerial topdressing industry.

The Andrews A1 is a conventional low-wing thick-section monoplane of plywood-covered spruce and steel construction with a bubble-type canopy, powered by a 65 hp (48 kW) Continental flat 4 air-cooled engine, and fitted with spatted tailwheel undercarriage.

== Operational history ==
The A1 was given the registration ZK-BLU in September 1955. It was completed and first flown in 1957, with the craft successfully completing flight testing. Andrews' proposed A2 design was not built, as the market that it had been intended for, at that time, was dominated by the American-designed, New Zealand-built Fletcher Fu24.

In 1973, Andrews restored the aircraft to flying condition. Since then, the Andrews A1 has been owned by a series of private owners.

== Specifications ==
Data from Aeropedia

General characteristics

- Crew: 1
- Length: 19 ft 0 in (5.8 m)
- Wingspan: 23 ft 11 in (7.3 m)
- Empty weight: 700 lb (317.5 kg)
- Gross weight: 899 lb (408 kg)
- Powerplant: 1 × Continental A65 4-cyl. air-cooled horizontally opposed piston engine, 65 hp (48 kW)

Performance

- Maximum speed: 79 kn (91 mph, 146 km/h)
- Cruise speed: 78 kn (89 mph, 144 km/h)
- Range: 235 nmi (270 mi, 435 km)
