= Armstrong Whitworth Sissit =

Sissit

General information
- Type: Scout
- National origin: United Kingdom
- Manufacturer: Armstrong Whitworth
- Designer: Frederick Koolhoven
- Status: Prototype
- Number built: 1

History
- First flight: 1914

The Armstrong Whitworth Sissit, also known as the Armstrong Whitworth F.K.1, was a prototype single-engined biplane fighter aircraft of the First World War. The first aircraft designed by Armstrong Whitworth, the Sissit was underpowered and only a single example was built.

== Development and design ==
In 1913, the British War Office asked the engineering company Sir W G Armstrong Whitworth & Co Ltd to manufacture aeroplanes and aircraft engines for the Army, and in response to that request, Armstrong Whitworth set up an aircraft department, hiring the Dutch designer Frederick Koolhoven, formerly chief engineer of British Deperdussin as chief designer.

Koolhoven's first design for Armstrong Whitworth was a small, single-seat, aircraft intended as a scout aircraft. A single-bay tractor biplane, the Sissit, or F.K.1 was fitted with balanced elevators and no fixed tailplane.

Although designed for an 80 hp (60 kW) Gnome 7 Lambda rotary engine, only a 50 hp (37 kW) Gnome 7 Omega could be obtained. Fitted with this engine, it was first flown by Koolhoven in September 1914, but proved to be underpowered, and was later modified with a fixed tailplane and enlarged ailerons. As greatly superior single seat scout aircraft such as the Sopwith Tabloid and Bristol Scout were already available, no further development of the Sissit took place.

== Specifications ==
Data from British Aeroplanes 1914-18

General characteristics

- Crew: 1
- Powerplant: 1 × Gnome 7 Omega 7-cylinder air-cooled rotary engine, 50 hp (37 kW)
- Propellers: 2-bladed fixed-pitch propeller

Performance

- Maximum speed: 75 mph (121 km/h, 65 kn)
- Stall speed: 30 mph (48 km/h, 26 kn)

Armament

- None

== See also ==
Aircraft of comparable role, configuration, and era

- Bristol Scout
- Martinsyde S.1
- Sopwith Tabloid
