= Aquaflight Aqua I =

Aqua I

General information
- Type: Civil utility aircraft
- Manufacturer: Aquaflight
- Designer: Meredith Wardle

History
- First flight: 1946

The Aquaflight Aqua I, also known as the W-6, was a 6-seat amphibious aircraft developed in the United States shortly after World War II.

== Variants ==
W-6
The initial prototype powered by 2 x 125 hp (93 kW) Lycoming O-290 4-cylinder horizontally opposed piston engines
Aqua I
Alternative designation of the W-6
W-6A
A second version powered by 2 x 125 hp (93 kW) Lycoming O-360 6-cylinder horizontally opposed piston engines
Aqua II
Alternative designation of the W-6A

== Specifications ==
Data from Jane's All the World's Aircraft 1948

General characteristics

- Crew: one pilot
- Capacity: 5 passengers
- Length: 29 ft 6 in (8.99 m)
- Wingspan: 36 ft 6 in (11.13 m)
- Height: 12 ft 0 in (3.66 m)
- Wing area: 215 sq ft (20.0 m^{2})
- Airfoil: NACA 23012-16
- Empty weight: 2,200 lb (998 kg)
- Gross weight: 3,600 lb (1,633 kg)
- Fuel capacity: 100 US gal (83 imp gal; 380 L)
- Powerplant: 2 × Lycoming O-290 four-cylinder piston engines , 125 hp (93 kW) each

Performance

- Cruise speed: 125 mph (201 km/h, 109 kn)
- Stall speed: 40 mph (64 km/h, 35 kn) (with flags, half load)
- Rate of climb: 1,250 ft/min (6.4 m/s)
