= Knoller =

Knoller is a surname. Notable people with the surname include:

- David Knoller, American producer, director, and writer
- Mark Knoller (1952–2025), American journalist
- Martin Knoller (1725–1804), Austrian-Italian painter
- Ohad Knoller (born 1976), Israeli actor
