= Arey (company) =

Russian security and surveillance equipment supplier

- Company type: Privately held company
- Industry: Aerospace
- Founded: circa 2002
- Headquarters: Krasnoyarsk, Russia
- Products: Paramotors, aircraft engines, surveillance and security equipment
- Website: www.arey.ru

Arey (Russian: "АРЭЙ") is a Russian security and surveillance equipment supplier based in Krasnoyarsk, Krasnoyarsk Krai. At one time was an aircraft manufacturer. In the mid-2000s the company specialized in the design and manufacture of paramotors in the form of ready-to-fly aircraft for the US FAR 103 Ultralight Vehicles rules and the European microlight category, as well as aircraft engines.

After ceasing production of aircraft, the company carried on as a supplier of security and surveillance equipment. The company seems to have been founded about 2002, but by 2015 the company website was non-functional and so it is not clear if the company is still in business or not.

The company designed and produced its own paramotor engine, the 16 hp (12 kW) Arey A-170 and then designed a paramotor to use the engine, the Arey Tatush T120M. The company also sold the Tatush with the Hirth F33 and Solo 210 engines as options.

A powered parachute design, the Arey Telezhka, was also developed in the form of a lightweight wheel set to be combined with the Tatush.

== Aircraft ==
Summary of aircraft built by Arey
Model name	First flight	Number built	Type
Arey Tatush	mid 2000s		Paramotor
Arey Telezhka	mid 2000s		Paramotor based on the Tatush
