= Aviatik (Berg) Dr.I =

WWI Austro-Hungarian fighter

Aviatik 30.24

General information
- Type: Fighter aircraft
- Manufacturer: Aviatik
- Designer: Julius von Berg
- Status: prototype only
- Primary user: Luftstreitkräfte
- Number built: 1+3 unfinished prototypes

History
- First flight: October 1917

The Aviatik 30.24 was a prototype Austro-Hungarian triplane fighter built by Aviatik in World War I.

== Design ==
In April 1917, through his employer, Julius von Berg offered the aviation arsenal (Fliegerarsenal, abbreviated Flars) to purchase aircraft for LFT:

- a double multipurpose triplane with the most powerful aircraft engine in Austria-Hungary at the time (the serially produced Austro-Daimler AD 6 engine [19th series], which developed 200 hp [147 kW]);
- Triplane fighter similar to the existing D.I biplane fighter

Flars refused a two-seater, but agreed to acquire a triplane fighter, which, if adopted, would have received the designation Aviatik Dr.I. On 17 September 1917 Julius von Berg presented to the aviation arsenal the final documentation of the aircraft, which received the type 30.24 internal designation (at Aviatik, the number 30 was the designation of prototypes, the second number after the dot signified a specific design in the corporate list).

The triplane 30.24 was a massive aircraft of solid wood construction (only ailerons and elevators and directions were made of steel pipes and web). The fuselage and tail assembly were almost completely taken from the proven design of the DI biplane fighter. The difference was the shortened gargrot behind the pilot's cabin (the biplane DI had the gargrot all the way to the keel).

Installed with a strong forward carrying out, the wings were single-spar with linen covering. The wing sizes were different: the upper one had a span of 7.23 m, the average was 7.13 m, and the lower one was 7.00 m. The ailerons with cable control were installed only on the upper wing. In contrast to the middle wing, the upper and lower wings were one-piece. The upper wing was connected to the fuselage by means of N-shaped central planes. The lower wing went under the fuselage and was attached to it with the help of four short racks. In order to provide at least some forward-and-down view, the root parts of the middle wing consoles had celluloid lining. Bearing surfaces were reinforced with two pairs of interplanar struts reinforced with a bracing system.

The front of the aircraft had a typical frontal radiator, behind which was a six-cylinder in-line water-cooled engine Austro-Daimler AD 6 (18th series). The engine developed power of 185 hp (136 kW) and rotated the four-bladed wooden screw Jaray, the blades of which were mounted with the letter X.

== Production of protototypes ==
In September 1917, Flugzeugfabrik Aviatik received a contract from Flars to build four prototypes of the 30.24. The first prototype carried the factory designation 30.24; the rest of the cars for which constructive changes were foreseen were not given signs. Julius von Berg was still working on these three cars, intending to apply the flight test experience to them and, in accordance with the requirements of the aviation arsenal, install the Austro-Daimler AD 6 engine (19th series).

The finished prototype 30.24 from the Flugzeugfabrik Aviatik plant, located in the Heiligenstadt district of Vienna, was transported in an onboard truck a few kilometers east off Aspernu to the airfield of an aviation arsenal, where its first flight took place in October 1917.

== Testing ==
The first tests of an unarmed prototype caused some disappointment. Although the aircraft was more maneuverable in the longitudinal plane and had a better rate of climb, its overall flight performance was not much superior to D.I.

In Aspern, the modified 30.24 reappeared in February 1918 and was raised to the sky on the 26th. However, the adjustment did not bring major improvements. One way or another, but the era of triplane is over. The aviation arsenal refused to launch the aircraft into mass production and transferred the only car to the Flek 8 division, from which it was transferred for experiments to the Flek 6 division located in Wiener Neustadt.

Several types of radiators, propellers were tested on the aircraft and the cockpit was modified to improve the front view of the pilot. These works were carried out in the interests of improving serial DI biplane fighters (these fighters were equipped with at least eight different types of radiators and propellers).

In September 1918, the Austro-Hungarian Air Force officially ("formally") transferred the 30.24 plane to the state balance and paid the company for its cost. Three unfinished prototypes were ordered to be dismantled, without waiting for the corresponding factory designations. So ended the career of von Berg triplane fighters. Interestingly, in April 1920, the prototype 30.24 appeared in the list of Austrian aircraft proposed by Czechoslovakia for purchase!

== Specifications (30.24) ==
Data from Austro-Hungarian Army Aircraft of World War One

General characteristics

- Crew: 1
- Length: 6.25 m (20 ft 6 in)
- Upper wingspan: 7.23 m (23 ft 9 in)
- Mid wingspan: 7.13 m (23 ft 5 in)
- Lower wingspan: 7 m (23 ft 0 in)
- Height: 2.75 m (9 ft 0 in)
- Wing area: 22.73 m^{2} (244.7 sq ft)
- Empty weight: 730 kg (1,609 lb)
- Gross weight: 900 kg (1,984 lb)
- Powerplant: 1 × Austro-Daimler 185hp 6-cylinder water-cooled in-line piston engine, 138 kW (185 hp)

later fitted with a 150 kW (200 hp) Austro-Daimler 200hp engine

- Propellers: 4-bladed fixed-pitch staggered blade wooden propeller

Performance

- Maximum speed: 174 km/h (108 mph, 94 kn)
- Time to altitude: 1,000 m (3,300 ft) in 2 minutes 40 seconds

Armament

- Guns: 2x fixed forward-firing 8 mm (0.315 in) Schwarzlose machine guns
