= Aviaimpex Yanhol =

Aviaimpex KT-112 Yanhol

General information
- Type: Three-seat light helicopter
- Manufacturer: Aviaimpex
- Status: Orders placed
- Number built: ~400

History
- Introduction date: August 31, 2001
- First flight: 2002
- Retired: 2010

The Aviaimpex KT-112 Yanhol (Ukrainian: Янгол, "Angel") is a light, three-seat helicopter produced by Aviaimpex in Ukraine. It was first presented to the media on August 31, 2001.

== Design and development ==
A three-seat prototype was first built in 2001, with its first flight planned for June 2002. The helicopter contains two 73.5 kW (98.6 hp) Rotax 912 ULS flat-four piston engines, pod-and-boom configuration, skid undercarriage, three-blade main rotor, and a two-blade tail rotor mounted on T-tail configuration. By May 2002, Aviaimpex had revealed plans for helicopter gunship and unmanned aerial vehicle versions. The Ukrainian Defence Ministry placed orders for 100 pilot training versions of this aircraft and the Ministry of the Interior ordered a number for patrol use. The Georgian government and the Moscow mayor's office also placed an order for this aircraft. A total of 400 "Angel"s were ordered in the two-seat configuration.

In 2010, the project ceased to exist. Part of the engineering team, in 2017 created its own company "Aviation Company Vector" where it continued to work on a completely updated twin-engine helicopter VM-4 "Jmil".

== Specifications ==
- Dimensions
  - Length: 7.45 m (24.4 ft)
  - Height: 2.475 m (8.12 ft)
- Weights
  - Empty: 524 kg (1,155 lb)
  - Maximum take-off: 870 kg (1,920 lb)
  - Maximum payload: 350 kg (770 lb)
- Main rotor
  - Diameter: 8.28 m (27.2 ft)
  - Blades: 3 m × 4.14 m (9.8 ft × 13.6 ft)
- Tail rotor
  - Diameter: 1.30 m (4 ft 3 in)
  - Blades: 2 cm × 65 cm (0.79 in × 25.59 in)
- Speeds
  - Maximum speed: 184 km/h (114 mph)
  - Maximum cruising speed: 165 km/h (103 mph)
- Maximum range: 340 km (210 mi)
