= Aviméta 92 =

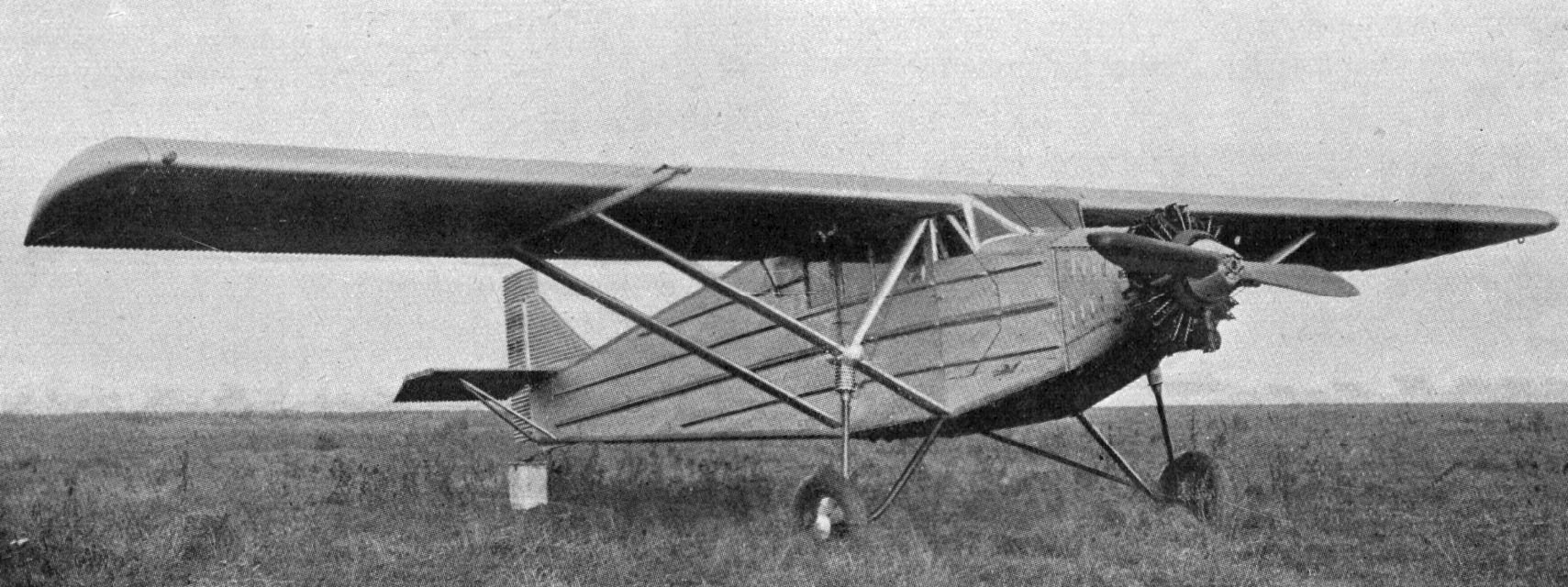

General information
- Type: Touring aircraft
- National origin: France
- Manufacturer: Aviméta (Société pour la Construction d'Avions Métallique)
- Number built: 2 or 3

History
- First flight: mid-December 1927

The Aviméta 92 was a French, all-metal, five seat monoplane built in the late 1920s. Three different engines were fitted, and one example flew the first non-stop Paris-Algiers flight in preparation for an abandoned trans-Atlantic attempt.

== Design and development ==
Aviméta, (Société pour la Construction d'Avions Métallique)‚ grew out of the Aeronautical Department of the Schneider-Creusot arms manufacturer. The Aviméta 92 was an all-metal aircraft, in accord with the company's principles.

Its high, rectangular plan wing had constant thickness and was mounted without dihedral. It was built around two spars and its riveted skin, made of Schneider-Creusot's patented aluminium-iron alloy Alférium, was corrugated in the line of flight for stiffness. Narrow chord ailerons filled the whole trailing edge. The wing was braced on each side with parallel pairs of streamlined struts from the lower fuselage to the wing spars at about mid-span.

The Aviméta 92 was powered by a variety of nose-mounted radial engines from Wright, Salmson and Lorraine-Dietrich, with powers in the range 89–149 kW (120–200 hp). The Bristol Titan was also considered. The engine had a pair of fuel tanks in the wings and an oil tank aft of the engine firewall. Behind it the fuselage cross-section was rectangular and completely clear internally back to the tail. It was based on four longerons interconnected by frames and covered with Alférium plates stiffened with longitudinal ribs. Seating was below the wing, with the enclosed cockpit set into the leading edge and a four-passenger cabin behind with two facing rows of side-by-side seats. There were passenger entry doors on both sides of the cabin and a separate, port-side door to the cockpit.

The empennage was conventional and angular, constructed in the same way as the wing. The horizontal tail was almost rectangular in plan and was mounted on top of the fuselage, supported by inverted V-struts from below. The fin was triangular and carried a deep, rectangular rudder which ran down to the keel, operating in a small elevator cut-out.

The Aviméta had conventional, fixed landing gear with a wide track. Each wheel was on a bent axle from the fuselage at the base of the forward wing strut, with a near-vertical leg fitted with a rubber shock absorber mounted on that same strut at a higher point which was reinforced with an inward-leaning strut to the upper fuselage and another rearwards to the base of the rear wing strut. The axles were stabilised with drag struts, again to the bottom of the rear wing strut. Aft, the tailskid was sprung steel.

== Operational history ==
The Aviméta 92 was flown for the first time near the beginning of December 1927, piloted by Moutonnier and powered by an uncowled nine-cylinder, 89 kW (120 hp) Salmson 9Ac radial. By mid-March 1928 one was flying with a 170 kW (230 hp) Lorraine 7M Mizar seven cylinder radial. This had a higher gross weight of 1,650 kg (3,640 lb) and a maximum speed of 200 km/h (120 mph; 110 kn). Its development continued at least into May.

The best known Aviméta 92 was powered by a 150 kW (200 hp) Wright R-790 Whirlwind nine-cylinder radial and was modified for a proposed long-distance flight, rumoured to be trans-Atlantic, to be flown by Détroyat. The alterations included an increased span with curved, tapered tips and extra fuel tanks able to hold up to 2,400 L (630 US gal; 530 imp gal). Tests on fuel consumption and reliability included flights in mid-April from Paris to Algeria (the first such non-stop journey) and back. Despite the preparations, no further long-distance flights by it were recorded in contemporary French journals.

At least 2 of these aircraft were purchased by Belgian nobleman and diplomat Eugène de Ligne to establish an air route between Belgium and the Congo. Both aircraft (registered as OO-AJY and OO-AJZ) were lost in early 1929 due to air crashes, the latter claiming the life of WWI fighter ace Edmond Thieffry and his co-pilot.

== Specifications (Salmson 120 hp) ==
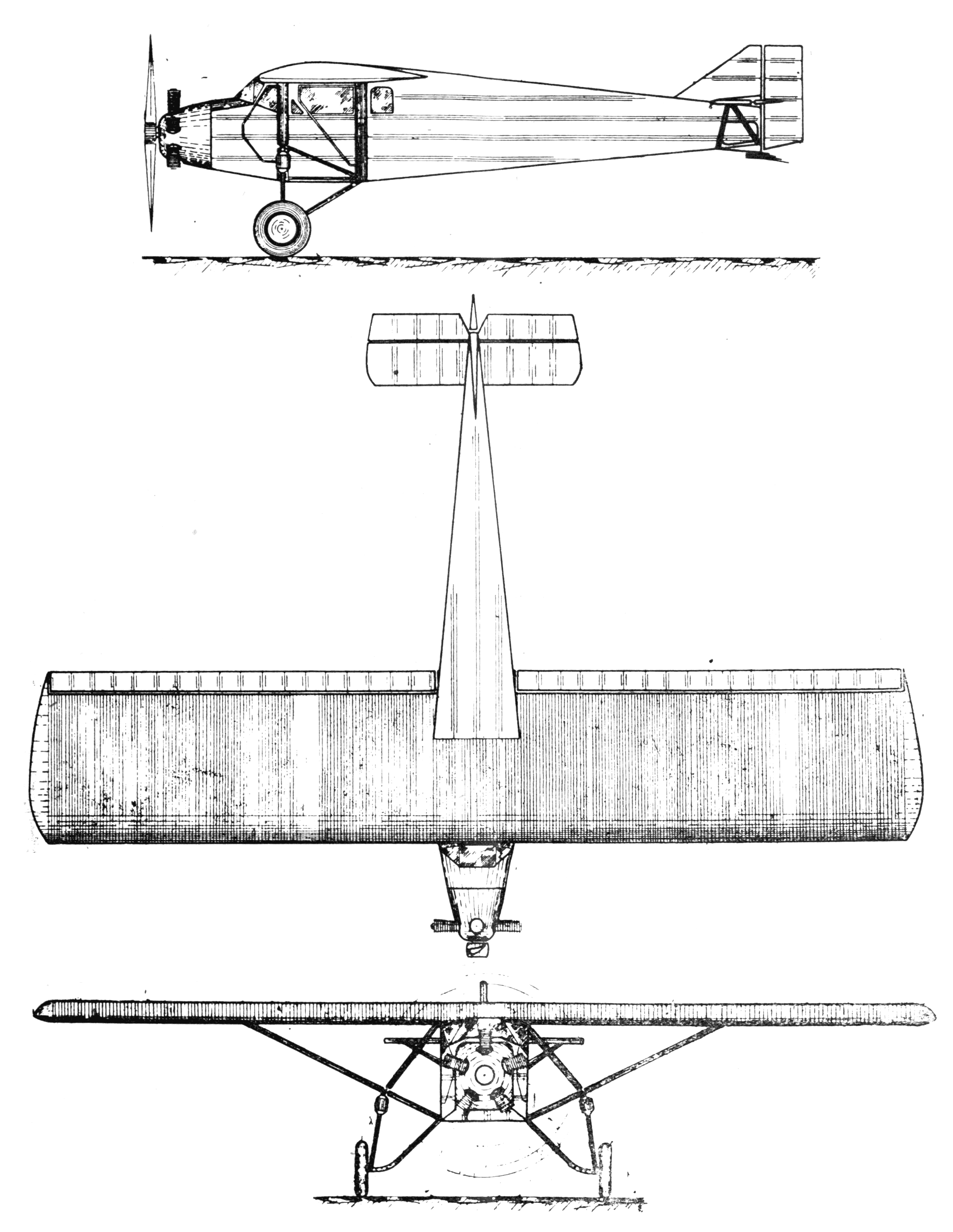
Aviméta 92 3-view drawing from L'Air January 1, 1928

Data from Les Ailes, January 1928

General characteristics

- Crew: one
- Capacity: four passengers
- Length: 9.30 m (30 ft 6 in)
- Wingspan: 12.60 m (41 ft 4 in)
- Height: 2.75 m (9 ft 0 in)
- Wing area: 29 m^{2} (310 sq ft)
- Empty weight: 785 kg (1,731 lb)
- Gross weight: 1,125 kg (2,480 lb)
- Fuel capacity: 150 L (33 imp gal; 40 US gal)
- Powerplant: 1 × Salmson 9Ac 9-cylinder radial engine, 89 kW (120 hp)
- Propellers: 2-bladed fixed pitch propeller

Performance

- Maximum speed: 160 km/h (99 mph, 86 kn)
- Endurance: 5 hr
- Service ceiling: 4,000 m (13,000 ft)
- Take-off speed: 55 km/h (34 mph)
