= Av8er =

British aircraft manufacturer

Av8er Limited
- Company type: Privately held company
- Industry: Aerospace, Information Technology
- Founded: 1996
- Founder: Paul Taylor
- Headquarters: Woodford Halse, Northamptonshire, United Kingdom
- Products: Paramotors, data centre servers and products
- Services: IT services
- Number of employees: 4
- Website: www.av8er.com

Av8er Limited (English: Aviator Limited) was a British aircraft manufacturer based in Woodford Halse, Northamptonshire and founded by Paul Taylor. The company specialized in the design and manufacture of paramotors in the form of ready-to-fly aircraft for the US FAR 103 Ultralight Vehicles and European rules.

The company was founded in 1996. The company continues as an information technology firm, supplying data centre services, related equipment and aerial photography services using UAVs, computer servers, media platforms, instructional videos and off-road vehicle engines and parts.

In the aircraft production years Av8er manufactured a range of paramotors noted for their lightness and attention to detail, in particular balancing and vibration isolating features. The models included the Explorer, Orbiter, Observer and Titan.

== Aircraft ==
Summary of aircraft built by Av8er Limited
Model name	First flight	Number built	Type
Av8er Explorer	mid-2000s		Paramotor
Av8er Observer Light	mid-2000s		Paramotor
Av8er Orbiter	mid-2000s		Paramotor
Av8er Titan	2006		Paramotor
