= Australian Autogyro Skyhook =

Skyhook

General information
- Type: Recreational autogyro
- Manufacturer: Australian Autogyro
- Designer: Ted Minty

History
- First flight: 1978

The Australian Autogyro Skyhook, originally flown as the Minty Skyhook, was a small, single seat autogyro marketed in kit form. Three versions were offered, with differing engines and cabin enclosures.

== Variants ==
- Mk I - open framework only, Rotax 503 engine
- Mk II - partially enclosed cabin, Volkswagen engine
- Mk III - fully enclosed cabin, Volkswagen engine

== Specifications (Mk III) ==
General characteristics

- Crew: one pilot
- Length: 3.00 m (10 ft 0 in)
- Height: 2.08 m (6 ft 10 in)
- Empty weight: 172 kg (380 lb)
- Gross weight: 300 kg (660 lb)
- Powerplant: 1 × Volkswagen air-cooled engine , 60 kW (80 hp)
- Main rotor diameter: 7.00 m (23 ft 0 in)
- Main rotor area: 38.5 m^{2} (414 sq ft)

Performance

- Maximum speed: 160 km/h (100 mph, 87 kn)
- Range: 225 km (140 mi, 120 nmi)
