= Audenis E.P.2 =

E.P.2

General information
- Type: Trainer
- National origin: France
- Designer: Charles Audenis
- Number built: 1

History
- First flight: 1916

The Audenis E.P.2, (sometimes known as the Audenis-Jacob E.P.2}, including Audenis' collaborator Jean Jacob), was a two-seat training biplane, designed and built in France during 1916. Powered by an 80 hp (60 kW) Le Rhône 9C 9-cylinder rotary engine, the E.P.2 had equal span single bay biplane wings and a fuselage in two parts, the forward part being fabric covered and the aft portion being of monocoque construction. The undercarriage was of conventional tailskid configuration with the duralumin mainwheel axle attached to the fuselage by V-struts. Dual controls were provided in the single open cockpit, with the student in the front seat and the instructor behind. Development of the E.P.2 did not continue after initial flight trials.

== Specifications (E.P.2) ==
Data from French aircraft of the First World War

General characteristics

- Crew: 2
- Length: 7.65 m (25 ft 1 in)
- Wingspan: 10.2 m (33 ft 6 in)
- Height: 2.8 m (9 ft 2 in)
- Wing area: 21 m^{2} (230 sq ft)
- Empty weight: 460 kg (1,014 lb)
- Gross weight: 714 kg (1,574 lb)
- Powerplant: 1 × Le Rhône 9C 9-cylinder air-cooled rotary piston engine, 60 kW (80 hp)
- Propellers: 2-bladed fixed-pitch propeller
