= Avama Stylus =

Slovak light-sport aircraft

Stylus

General information
- Type: Light-sport aircraft
- National origin: Slovakia
- Manufacturer: Avama
- Status: In production

History
- Manufactured: 2010-present
- Introduction date: 2010

The Avama Stylus is a Slovak light-sport aircraft, designed and produced by Avama of Poprad and introduced at AERO Friedrichshafen in 2010. The aircraft is supplied as a kit for amateur construction or as a complete ready-to-fly-aircraft.

== Design and development ==
The aircraft was designed to comply with the US light-sport aircraft rules as a joint venture with SK Model. It features a strut-braced high-wing a two-seats-in-side-by-side configuration enclosed cockpit, fixed tricycle landing gear or conventional landing gear and a single engine in tractor configuration.

The Stylus' fuselage is made from welded steel tubing, while the wing structure is aluminum. The fuselage and flying surfaces are covered in preformed plastic and doped aircraft fabric. Its 9.5 m (31.2 ft) span wing employs a dual spar design with V-struts and jury struts. The standard engine is the 80 hp (60 kW) Rotax 912UL or the 100 hp (75 kW) Rotax 912ULS four-stroke powerplant.

== Variants ==
Stylus X2
Tailwheel version
Stylus X3
Nose wheel version

== Specifications (Stylus X3) ==
Data from Bayerl and Avama

General characteristics

- Crew: one
- Capacity: one passenger
- Length: 6.02 m (19 ft 9 in)
- Wingspan: 9.5 m (31 ft 2 in)
- Height: 2.17 m (7 ft 1 in)
- Gross weight: 480 kg (1,058 lb)
- Fuel capacity: 76 litres (17 imp gal; 20 US gal)
- Powerplant: 1 × Rotax 912UL four cylinder, liquid and air-cooled, four stroke aircraft engine, 60 kW (80 hp)

Performance

- Maximum speed: 185 km/h (115 mph, 100 kn)
- Cruise speed: 160 km/h (99 mph, 86 kn)
- Stall speed: 62 km/h (39 mph, 33 kn)
- g limits: +4/-2
