= Arnold AR-5 =

Aircraft Model

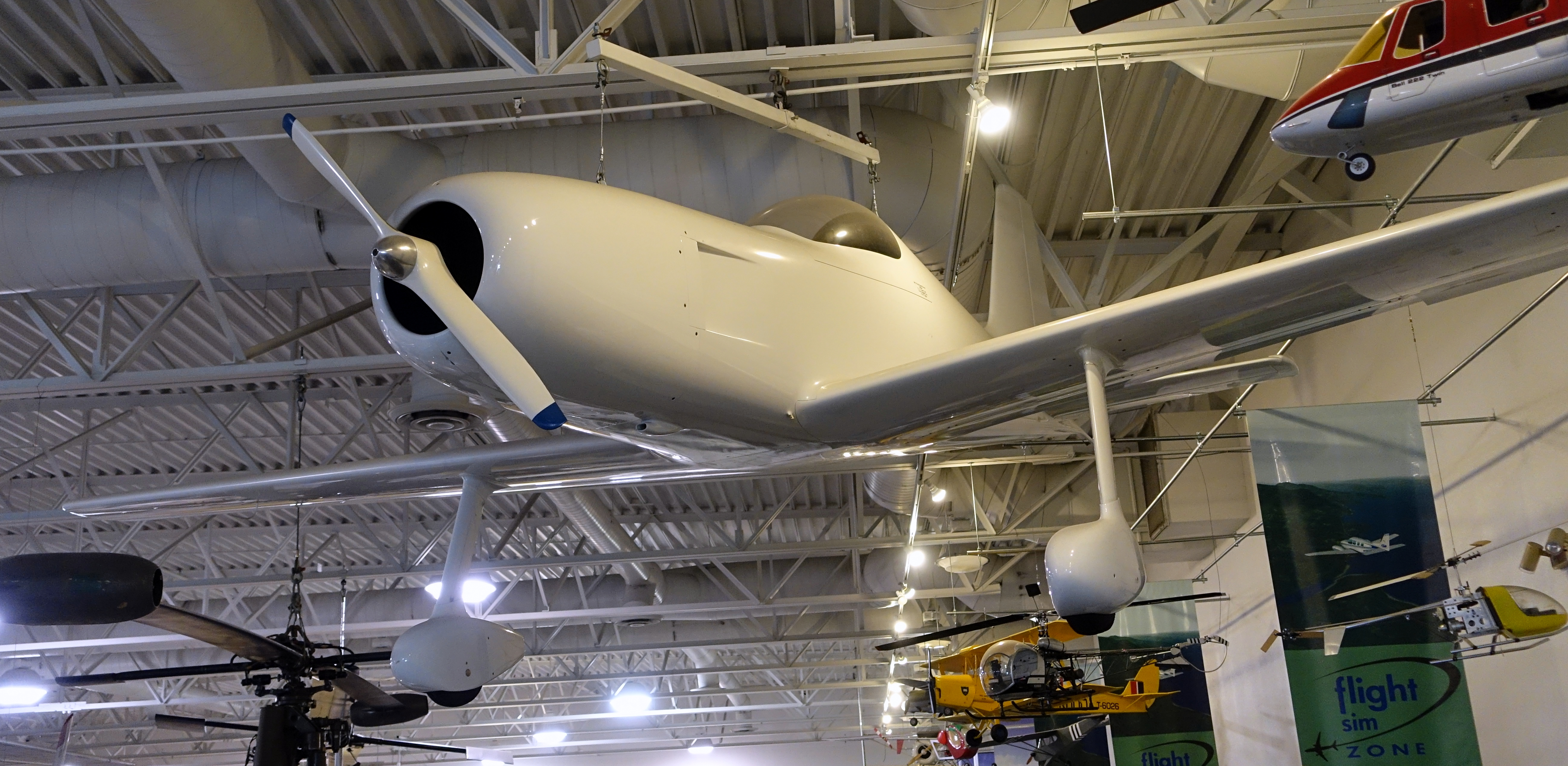
The plane in 2015

The Arnold AR-5 is an experimental single seat, low-wing sport monoplane with fixed conventional undercarriage, designed and built by Mike Arnold.

== Development and design ==
Originally conceived by Mike Arnold as a personal sport airplane with excellent performance and good handling qualities. The design outperformed initial performance estimates for its relatively low power output, exceeding 200mph with only 65hp. Constructed of fiberglass-epoxy matrix composite material utilizing the "moldless method" popularized by Burt Rutan. Careful attention to aerodynamic detail resulted in noteworthy laminar flow drag reduction, as documented by aerodynamicists Alex Strojnik and Bruce Carmichael.

== Legacy ==
In 1992, the AR-5 flown by Mike Arnold set the FAI C1a Class World Speed Record of 343,08 km/h over a 3.0km course. Mike wrote several articles about his design methodology for various magazines. The sole existing example resides at the Hiller Aviation Museum, San Carlos, CA.

== Specifications ==
General characteristics

- Wingspan: 21 ft (6.4 m)
- Wing area: 55.125 sq ft (5.1213 m^{2})
- Aspect ratio: 8
- Airfoil: Root: NACA 65/3-418 Tip: NACA 65/2-215
- Empty weight: 488 lb (221 kg)
- Fuel capacity: 12 Gal
- Powerplant: × Rotax 582 Inline, Liquid Cooled 2-Stroke., 65 hp (48 kW)

Performance

- Maximum speed: 213.18 mph (343.08 km/h, 185.25 kn)
- Cruise speed: 207 mph (333 km/h, 180 kn)
- Stall speed: 53 mph (85 km/h, 46 kn)
- Range: 500 mi (800 km, 430 nmi) 45 min reserve
- g limits: +6/-4g
