= Knoller C.II =

Austro-Hungarian reconnaissance aircraft

C.II
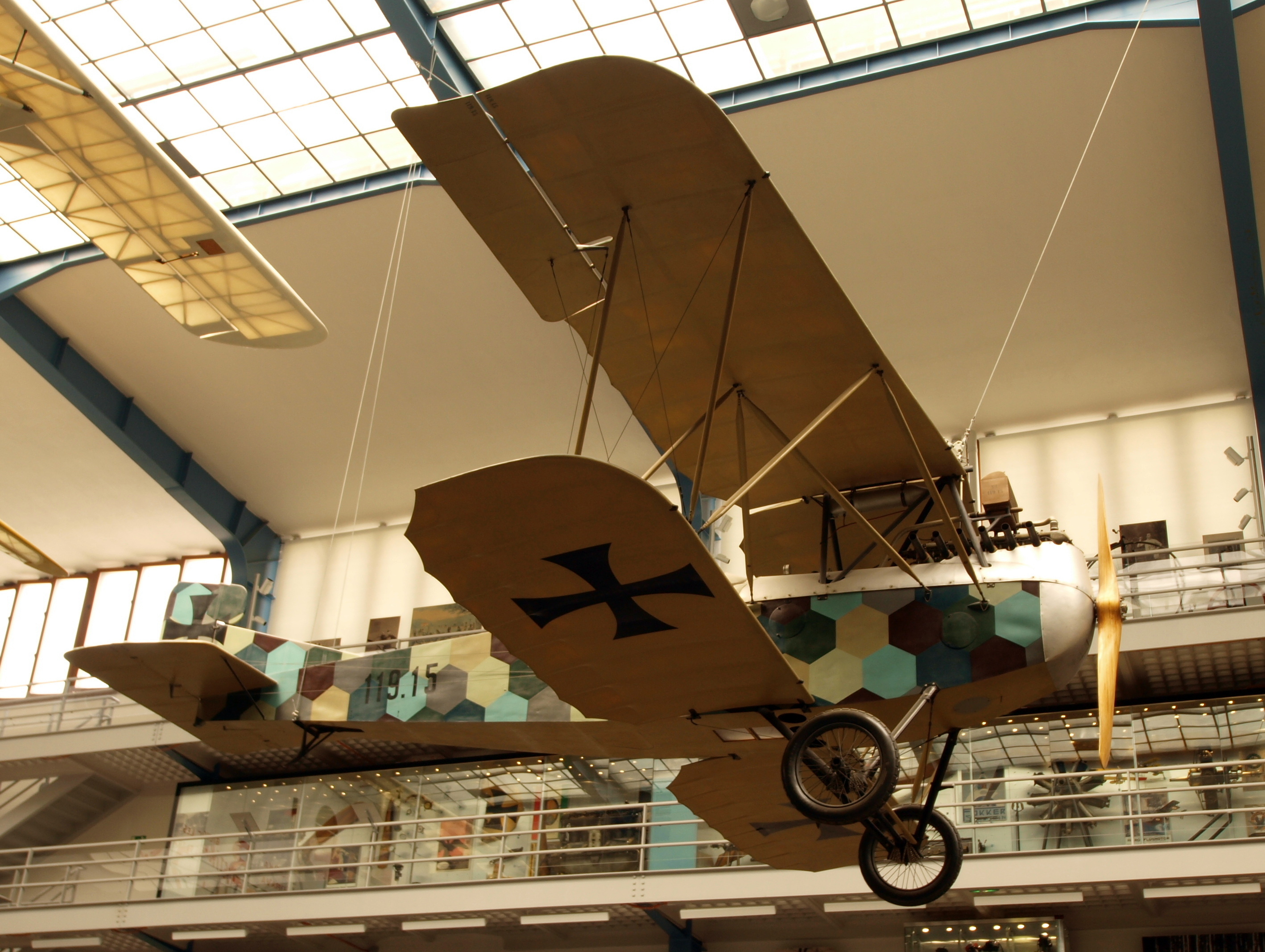

General information
- Type: Reconnaissance aircraft
- National origin: Austria-Hungary
- Manufacturer: Aviataik - Österreichish-Ungarische Flugzeugfabrik Aviatik, Lohner - Lohnerwerke GmbH and WKF - Wiener Karosserie und Flugzeugfabrik
- Designer: Richard Knoller
- Primary user: KuKLFT
- Number built: 120 (many were stored un-assembled)

History
- First flight: 1916

The Knoller C.II was a reconnaissance aircraft built in Austria-Hungary during World War I for use by the Austro-Hungarian army.

== Design and development ==
The C.II was a conventional biplane design with staggered wings, and seated the pilot and observer in tandem in an open cockpit. Like Knoller's preceding C.I design, the upper wing was swept back, but not as far as it had been on the earlier aircraft. The structure was wooden throughout, with the wings skinned in fabric and the fuselage in plywood. The interplane struts were made of steel and arranged in a warren truss configuration.

Initial production was undertaken in three batches of 24 aircraft, one each by Aviatik, Lohner, and WKF, with the first machine delivered to the Army in September 1916. On 10 February the following year, the wings of this aircraft collapsed in flight and its crew was killed in the ensuing crash, leading to production and further flying of the type to be suspended. A single example is preserved at the National Technical Museum in Prague.

== Operational history ==
Relatively few Knoller C.II aircraft were issued to front-line units, with almost unanimous criticism of the strength, build quality and flying characteristics. Although all the contracted aircraft were built, many were stored un-assembled, due to the advent of other types with superior performance and flying qualities.

== Variants ==
C.II(Av) series 36
Knoller C.II production, powered by 185 hp (138 kW) Austro-Daimler 185hp 6-cyl. engines, at Aviatik -Österreichish-Ungarische Flugzeugfabrik Aviatik - 24 built.
C.II(Av) series 136
Knoller C.II production, powered by 160 hp (120 kW) Austro-Daimler 160hp 6-cyl. engines, at Aviatik -Österreichish-Ungarische Flugzeugfabrik Aviatik - 24 contracted all stored un-assembled.
C.II(Lo) series 19
Knoller C.II production, powered by 185 hp (138 kW) Austro-Daimler 185hp 6-cyl. engines, at Lohner - Lohnerwerke GmbH, 16 built.
C.II(Lo) series 119
Knoller C.II production, powered by 160 hp (120 kW) Austro-Daimler 160hp 6-cyl. engines, at Lohner - Lohnerwerke GmbH, 32 built.
C.II(WKF) series 81
Knoller C.II production, powered by 160 hp (120 kW) Austro-Daimler 160hp 6-cyl. engines, at WKF - Wiener Karosserie und Flugzeugfabrik, 24 built.

== Operators ==
Austria-Hungary

- Austro-Hungarian Imperial and Royal Aviation Troops

Flik 66/D (81.01, 81.02 and 81.04)
Flik 67/D (81.03 and 81.05)
Flek 1, 5, 8, and 18 (series 81)
Airmail flight at Aspern (81.11 and 81.23 with 4 hour fuel tank)
Flik 70 (36.08, 36.10, 36.11, 36.14 and 36.20)
Flek 5 (series 36)
Flik 50
Flieger-Versuchsabteilung Stryj

Hungary

- Hungarian Air Force

Hungarian 5th Air Squadron (9x series 119)

== Specifications (C.II(Av) series 36) ==
Data from

General characteristics

- Crew: 2
- Length: 8.54 m (28 ft 0 in)
- Upper wingspan: 10.37 m (34 ft 0 in)
- Lower wingspan: 8.14 m (26 ft 8 in)
- Height: 3.02 m (9 ft 11 in)
- Wing area: 30 m^{2} (320 sq ft)
- Empty weight: 695 kg (1,532 lb)
- Gross weight: 975 kg (2,150 lb)
- Powerplant: 1 × Austro-Daimler 185hp 6-cyl. 6-cylinder water-cooled in-line piston engine, 138 kW (185 hp)

Performance

- Maximum speed: 160 km/h (99 mph, 86 kn)
- Time to altitude: 1,000 m (3,300 ft) in 4 minutes 24 seconds
