= Auster D.6 =

D.6
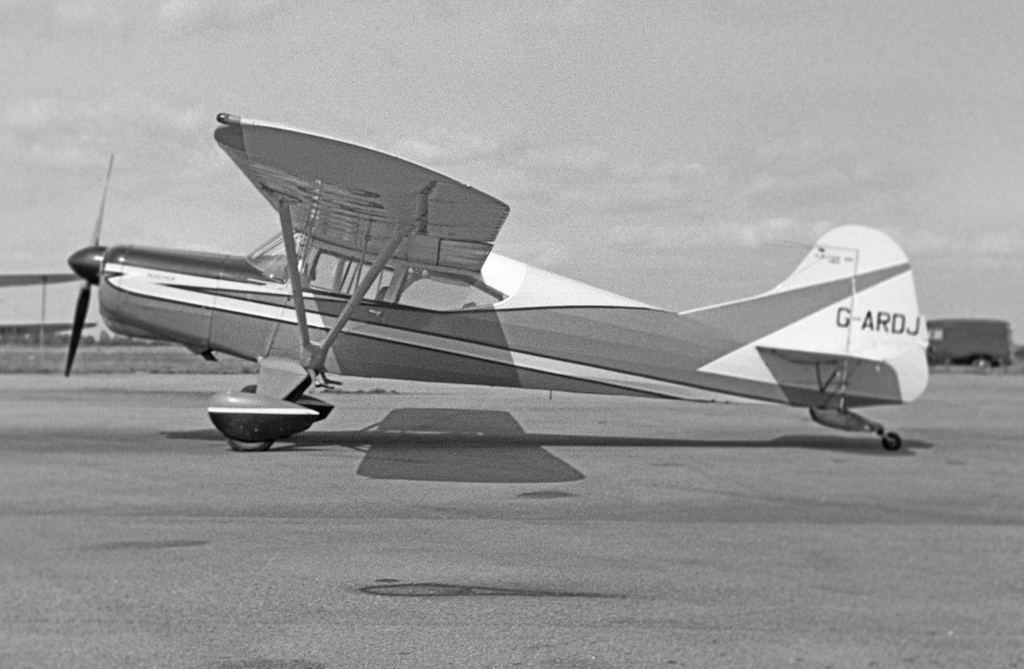

General information
- Type: Utility aircraft
- Manufacturer: Auster, Beagle Aircraft
- Number built: 4

History
- First flight: 9 May 1960
- Developed from: Auster Autocar
- Developed into: Beagle Airedale

The Auster D.6 was a four-seat British light aircraft, a development of the Auster Autocar with a horizontally opposed engine. It was available with a choice of two engines, a 160 hp Lycoming O-320 or 180 hp Lycoming O-360. When Auster was taken over by Beagle Aircraft in September 1960, development of the D.6 was dropped, while the D.4 and D.5 continued in limited production. Only four D.6 aircraft were completed, one D.6/160 (later converted to D.6/180 standard) and three as D.6/180. A fifth airframe was never completed and was later stored at Carr Farm, Newark (2003).

== Specifications (D.6/180) ==
General characteristics

- Crew: one pilot
- Capacity: 3 passengers
- Wingspan: 36 ft 0 in (10.97 m)
- Powerplant: 1 × Lycoming O-360 , 180 hp (134 kW)
