= Beagle B.218 =

B.218 / B.242

General information
- Type: Light transport monoplane
- National origin: United Kingdom
- Manufacturer: Beagle Aircraft Limited
- Status: Destroyed
- Number built: 1

History
- Manufactured: 1961-1962
- First flight: 19 August 1962

The Beagle B.218X (also known as the Beagle-Miles M.218) was a 1960s British four-seat twin-engined light transport monoplane built by Beagle Aircraft Limited at Shoreham Airport. The prototype was modified into the Beagle B.242X but neither variant entered production.

== Design and development ==
Before it became part of Beagle, F. G. Miles Ltd had looked at producing replacements for the (single-engined) Miles Messenger and (twin-engined) Gemini. Three low-wing monoplane designs were considered, the single-engined fixed landing gear Miles 114 in two and four-seat versions and the retractable landing gear twin-engined four-seat Miles 115. When Beagle was formed it was decided to build a prototype of the Miles 115 design designated the Beagle-Miles M.218X; it was also decided to build a prototype of the Miles 114 as the M.117 but in the end it was not built.

The M.218 was of plastic and metal construction; the wing spar box and the rear lower fuselage were made from aluminium alloy which formed a T-shaped load bearing structure which carried the metal tailplane and all the plastic components. It was powered by two 145 hp (108 kW) Rolls-Royce Continental O-300 piston engines and had a retractable tricycle landing gear. Construction started at the end of 1961 and it made its first flight at Shoreham on 19 August 1962. Registered G-ASCK it was displayed at the 1962 Farnborough Air Show priced at £9,800, it did create interest from customers although they had a preference for metal built aircraft rather than the plastic M.218.

The production aircraft were to be named Martlet but the company did not have the money to put it into production due to the overspend on the Beagle B.206. In May 1963, George Miles left Beagle and the M.218 designation was changed to B.218. The prototype was grounded in February 1964 for extensive modification. The majority of the glass fibre components were replaced in light alloy, which incorporated the original T-frame structure, with more powerful 195 hp (145 kW) IO-360 engines fitted. Now re-registered G-ASTX and designated as the Beagle B.242X, it flew again on 27 August 1964. The aircraft was issued with a certificate of airworthiness on 18 June 1965 but the company was focussed on the production of the twin-engined Beagle B.206 and the design of the single-engined Beagle Pup and could not afford to further develop the type or put it into production, although a second airframe was commenced. The prototype was withdrawn from use in 1966 and subsequently destroyed in a building fire in August 1969.

The Beagle M.218 was unsuccessful as it became a political football in the internal strife between the former Miles Aircraft directors and the Beagle board; although it was attractive to Beagle distributors, it was seen as a competitor to the Beagle 206. Over £300,000 was spent on the project for which Beagle had neither a cohesive plan nor the necessary resources to produce.

== Variants ==
Beagle B.218X
Prototype with O-300 engines, 1 built.
Beagle B.242X
M.218 rebuilt with extensive modifications and fitted with IO-360 engines.

== Specifications (B.218X) ==
Data from British Civil Aircraft since 1919 Volume 1.

General characteristics

- Crew: 1
- Capacity: 3 passengers
- Length: 25 ft 4 in (7.72 m)
- Wingspan: 37 ft 0 in (11.28 m)
- Height: 8 ft 6 in (2.59 m)
- Wing area: 170 sq ft (16 m^{2})
- Aspect ratio: 8.05:1
- Airfoil: NACA 23018 at root, NACA 2412 at tip
- Empty weight: 2,164 lb (982 kg)
- Gross weight: 3,200 lb (1,451 kg)
- Fuel capacity: 70 L (15 imp gal; 18 US gal)
- Powerplant: 2 × Rolls-Royce Continental O-300-C air-cooled flat-six, 145 hp (108 kW) each

Performance

- Maximum speed: 185 mph (298 km/h, 161 kn)
- Cruise speed: 160 mph (260 km/h, 140 kn)
- Range: 1,000 mi (1,600 km, 870 nmi) (max fuel)
- Service ceiling: 21,700 ft (6,600 m)
- Rate of climb: 1,370 ft/min (7.0 m/s)

== See also ==
Aircraft of comparable role, configuration, and era

- Beagle B.206
