= Beagle Airedale =

British light civil aircraft

A.109 Airedale
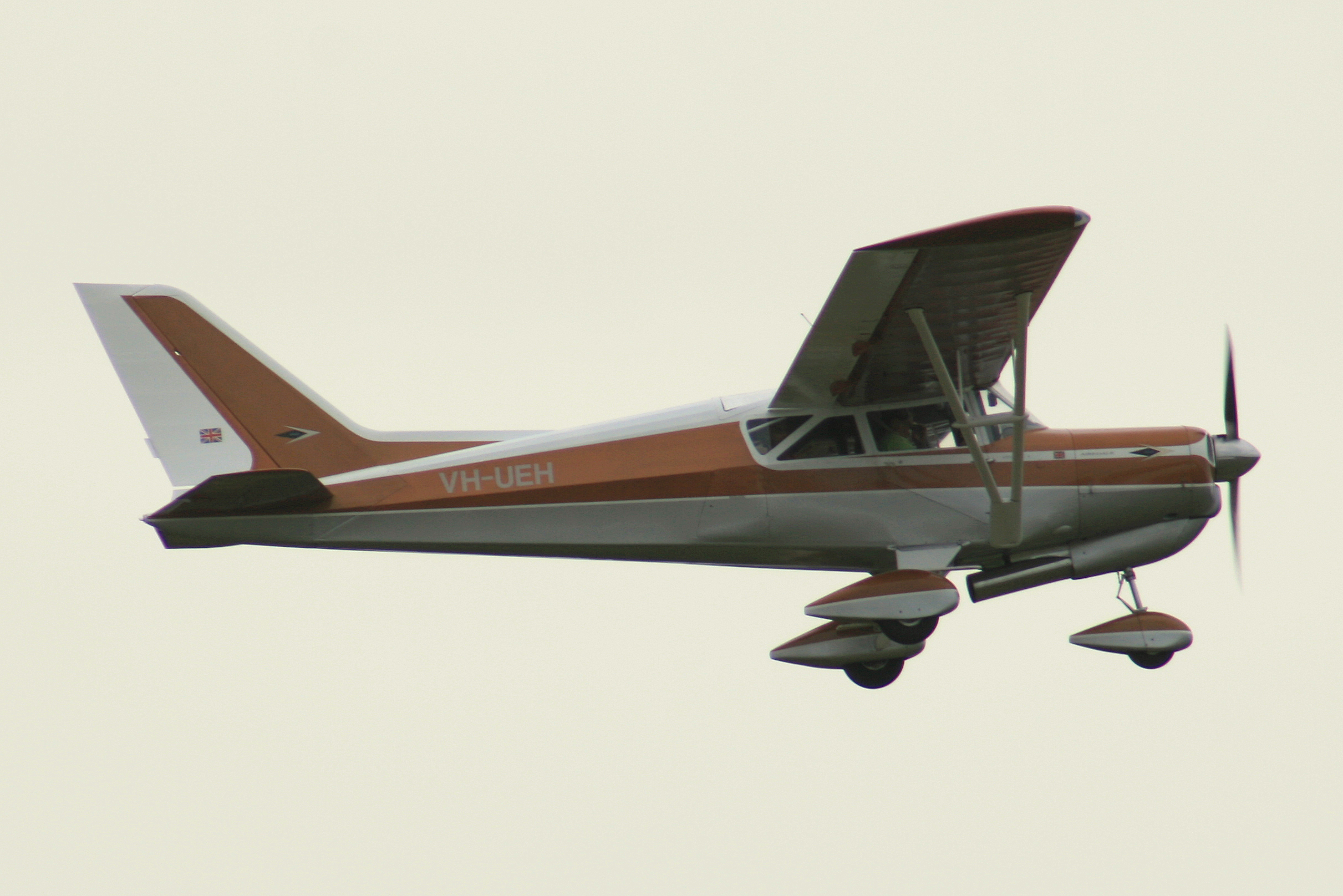
- Airedale just after take-off

General information
- Type: Civil utility aircraft
- National origin: United Kingdom
- Manufacturer: Auster; Beagle Aircraft
- Number built: 43

History
- First flight: 16 April 1961
- Developed from: Auster D.6

The Beagle A.109 Airedale is a British light civil aircraft developed in the 1960s.

== Design and development ==
The Airedale was a four-seat, high-wing braced monoplane with a fixed, tricycle undercarriage, mainly of steel tube construction and fabric covered. It was originally designed as the Auster D.8 which was a modified tricycle version of the Auster D.6. Although similar in many respects, the Airedale was not based on the earlier Auster C.6 Atlantic design, of which a single aircraft was built and flown in 1958 (registration G-APHT). The first three D.8 airframes were in construction when Beagle Aircraft bought the Rearsby-based Auster company in 1960. At this stage Beagle began introducing a series of major modifications to the D.8, which included moving the pilot's door aft and adding a second door on the right, widening the rear cabin, lengthening the rear fuselage and adding a swept fin, as well as many minor changes. Following the first flight of the 1st prototype G-ARKE, seven further development and pre-production aircraft were flown. As changes continued, these eight aircraft were repeatedly modified and rebuilt; these modifications continually added extra weight to the aircraft, and costs spiralled. Concerns about the weight, when it was suggested that "the increase in weight was resulting in a 2-seater aircraft", were ignored by the design team.

The performance of the Airedale, although faster than the D.6 on the same engine, was decidedly lacklustre, largely due to its comparatively high structural weight, and it was unable to compete in the market with its US competitors. This was largely because of the out-dated steel tube/fabric construction, compared to the more modern all-metal Piper Cherokee and Cessna 172 designs, but also the performance was worse and production quality was poor. Beagle had retained the older construction method as development of monocoque techniques would have extended the design period; the Airedale itself took about four and a half months from starting on the design drawings to first flight. However, the benefit of this was entirely lost by the subsequent protracted development period. Additionally the Airedale proved expensive to manufacture with the production man-hours remaining higher than anticipated and consequently a higher price than the American imports. It was also reported that dealers abroad only consented to buying a demonstrator Airedale as they wanted to be appointed as agents for the Beagle-Miles M.218 which they viewed as far more saleable.

A single Airedale, the first prototype (registration G-ARKE) was refitted (by Marshall's of Cambridge) with a 180 hp (134 kW) Continental GO-300-E engine so that it could be part of the SBAC Display at the 1961 Farnborough Airshow, as the standard Airedale was not eligible on account of its US-built Lycoming O-360 engine. This model was designated A.111. Ostensibly this engine was made by Rolls-Royce under their new licence agreement but the engine came from the USA. Whether this expenditure was justified by the publicity is debatable, and the performance was worse.

Production of the Airedale ceased in 1963 after production of only 43 aircraft, when it was calculated that the break-even figure could be as high as an unfeasible 675 aircraft. The Airedale took some 6,900 man-hours and £2,037 in labour charges to build, against a selling price below £5,000; at one stage in 1963, Beagle had 20 unsold Airedales. The Airedale and the Terrier were both built by Beagle as stop-gaps whilst more modern aircraft were designed, but both incurred significant losses, in the case of the Airedale almost £500,000. It appears that a decision in 1962 to continue production past the first 25 aircraft was only made due to the optimistic outlook and predictions of the Chairman, Peter Masefield.

== Specifications (A.109) ==
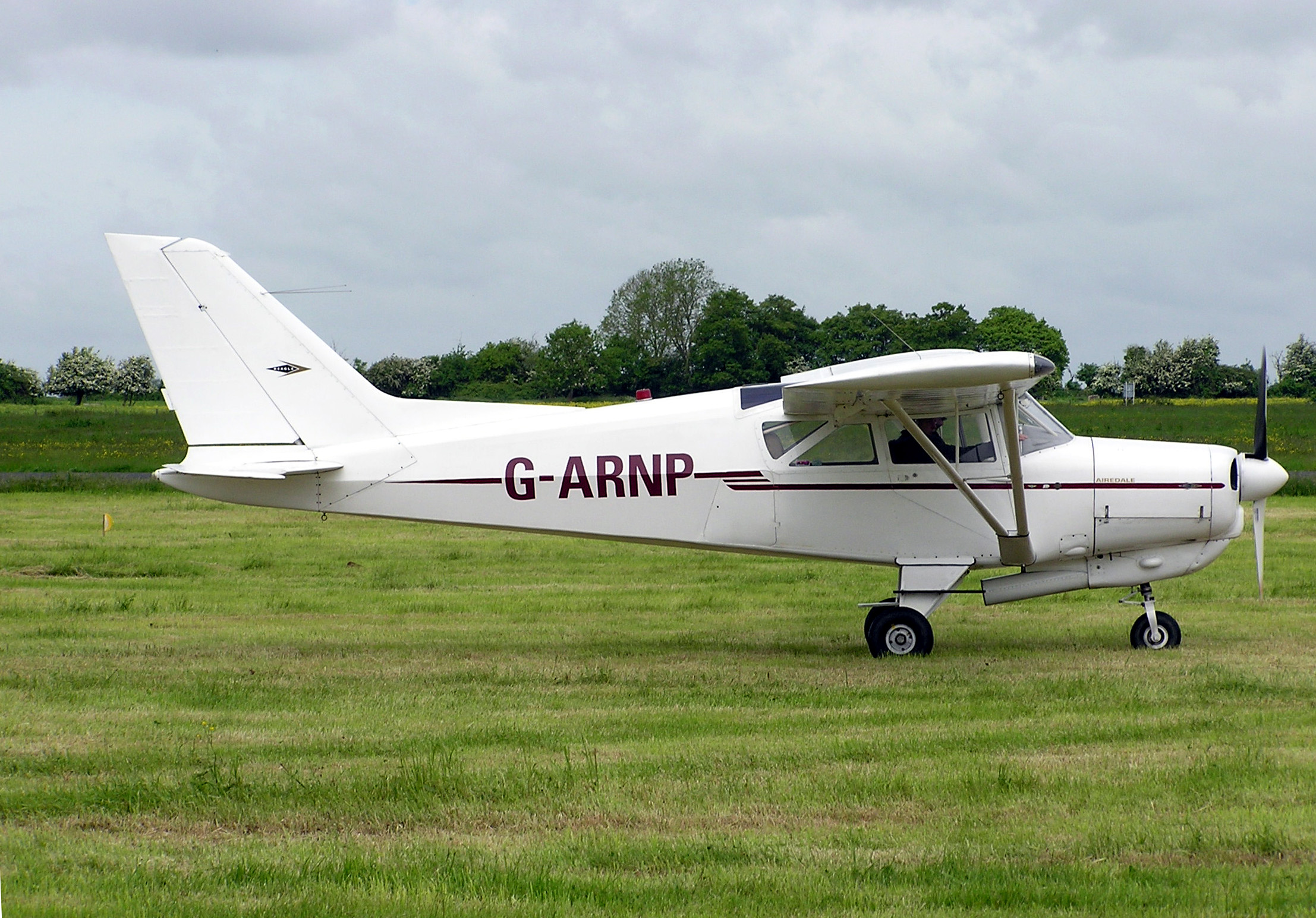
A British-registered Airedale

Data from British Civil Aircraft since 1919 Volume I

General characteristics

- Crew: 1
- Capacity: 3 passengers
- Length: 26 ft 4 in (8.03 m)
- Wingspan: 36 ft 4 in (11.07 m)
- Height: 10 ft 0 in (3.05 m)
- Wing area: 185 sq ft (17.2 m^{2})
- Aspect ratio: 6.9:1
- Airfoil: NACA 23012
- Empty weight: 1,630 lb (739 kg)
- Gross weight: 2,750 lb (1,247 kg)
- Fuel capacity: 50 imp gal (60 US gal; 230 L) maximum
- Powerplant: 1 × Lycoming O-360-A1A air-cooled, four-cylinder horizontally-opposed engine, 180 hp (130 kW)
- Propellers: 2-bladed McCauley 2D36C14/78KM/4 constant-speed propeller, 6 ft 2 in (1.88 m) diameter

Performance

- Maximum speed: 140 mph (230 km/h, 120 kn)
- Cruise speed: 133 mph (214 km/h, 116 kn)
- Stall speed: 52 mph (84 km/h, 45 kn) (flaps down)
- Range: 940 mi (1,510 km, 820 nmi)
- Service ceiling: 12,000 ft (3,700 m)
- Rate of climb: 650 ft/min (3.3 m/s)

== See also ==
Aircraft of comparable role, configuration, and era

- Cessna 172
- Cessna 175
- Piper Cherokee
