= Beagle B.206 =

1961 touring aircraft family by Beagle

Beagle B.206 / Basset
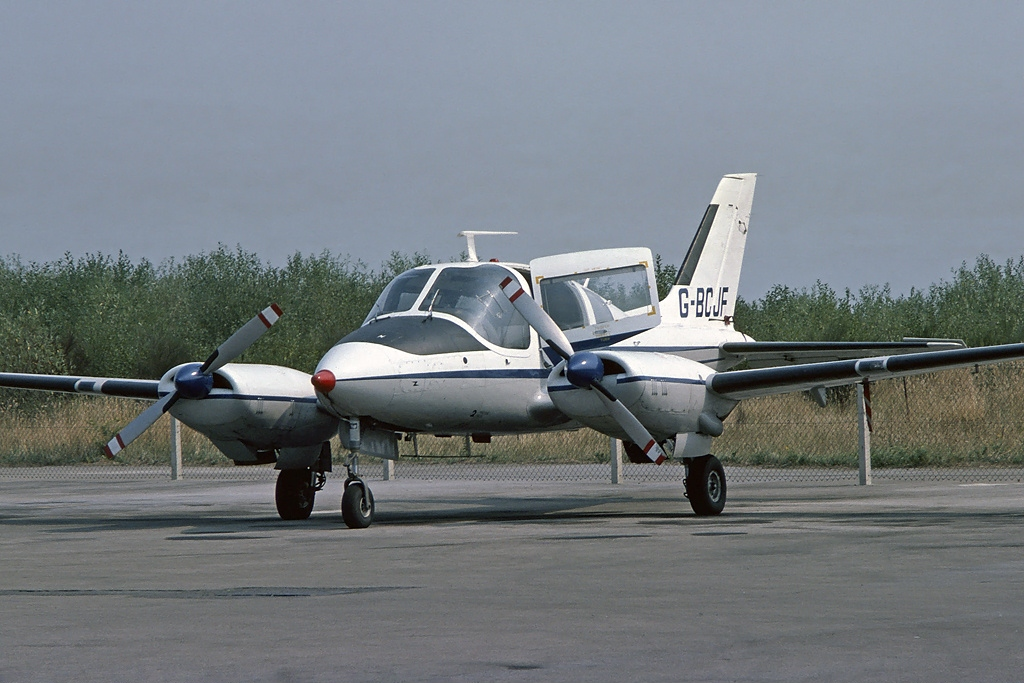

General information
- Type: Light transport
- National origin: United Kingdom
- Manufacturer: Beagle Aircraft Limited
- Primary user: Royal Air Force
- Number built: 79

History
- Manufactured: 1964–1969
- Introduction date: 1965
- First flight: 15 August 1961

The Beagle B.206 is a 1960s British seven-seat twin-piston engined liaison and communication aircraft built by Beagle Aircraft Limited at Shoreham Airport and Rearsby Aerodrome.

== Design and development ==
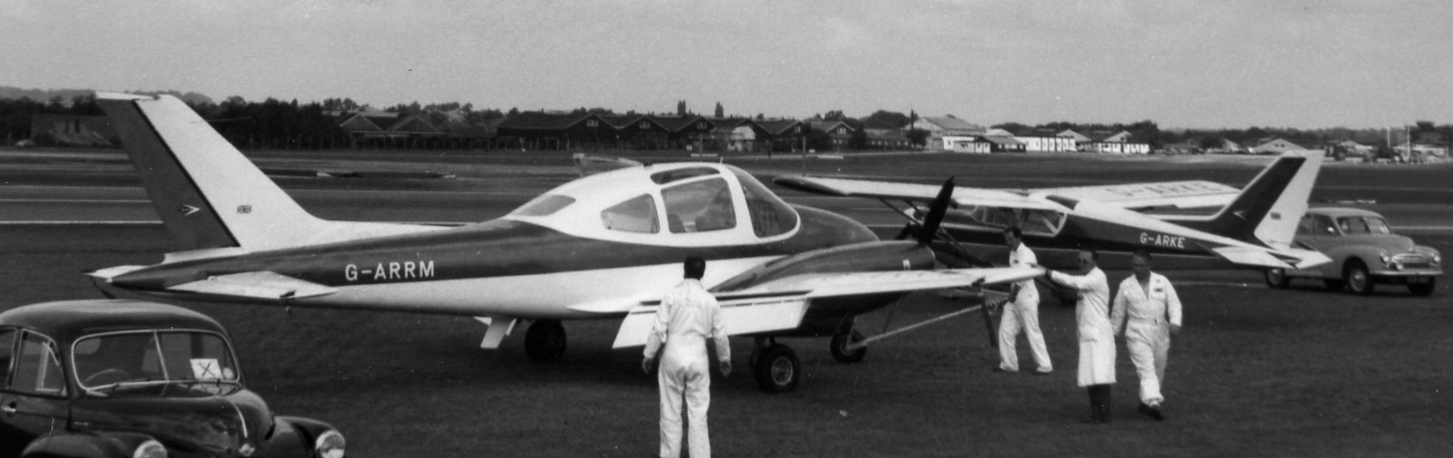
The Beagle B.206X prototype's public debut at the Farnborough Air Show in 1961

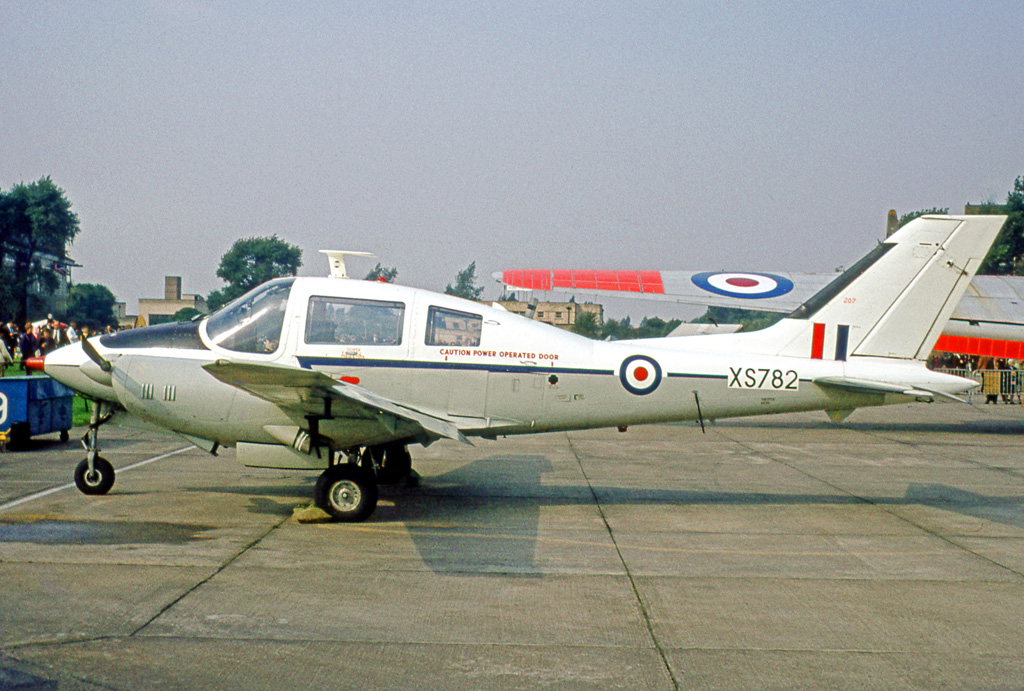
Basset CC.1 of the RAF Southern Communication Squadron at RAF Coltishall in 1969

The design of a twin-engined light transport began in 1960 as part of Bristol Aircraft at Filton termed the Bristol 220 but after the formation of BAC Peter Masefield, MD of Bristol Aircraft took the project to Beagle. The prototype registered G-ARRM (designated the B.206X) first flew from Shoreham Airport, West Sussex on 15 August 1961. The prototype aircraft was a five-seat all metal low-wing monoplane powered by two Continental flat-six engines. Owned since 1990 by Brooklands Museum then loaned to the Bristol Aero Collection before eventually being restored by a team of volunteers at Shoreham Airport, it was loaned to the Farnborough Air Sciences Trust Museum at Farnborough, Hampshire from 2011 until 2017. With the expiry of the loan agreement, it was dismantled and transported from FAST to Brooklands by road on 3 August 2017.

The second prototype (registered G-ARXM and designated B.206Y) was slightly larger with a larger-span wing and seating for seven. Two aircraft (designated B.206Z) were built for evaluation by the Ministry of Aviation at Boscombe Down and an order for twenty aircraft (designated B.206R) for the Royal Air Force followed. The RAF aircraft were designated Basset CC.1 and were built at Rearsby Aerodrome, Leicestershire.

Initial production was the Series 1 aircraft which were powered by 310 hp Rolls-Royce Continental GIO-470A engines, and the first aircraft (G-ASMK) first flew on 17 July 1964. This aircraft was then converted as the first Series 2 aircraft with 340 hp Continental GTSIO-520C turbocharged engines and first flew as such on 23 June 1965. The production Series 2 (initially known as the B.206S) was also fitted with a large freight door. The aircraft was soon in demand with air taxi companies and as a light transport for companies. Three aircraft were delivered to the Royal Flying Doctor Service in Australia.

A Series 3 was developed with a raised rear fuselage to carry 10-passengers but only two were flown as such, one modified from a Series 2 airframe (G-35-28 c/n B.074) was used as the "Aerodynamic Test Vehicle" and later re-converted back to a Series 2 as G-AXPV and the second (G-AWLN, c/n B.080) which was converted on the production line and ultimately sold in Brazil; a third airframe (B.037, which had been damaged in production) was converted as a mock-up only and never flown. When the company needed the room at Rearsby to build the Beagle Pup, production of the B.206 ended with the 79th aircraft, (c/n B.080). Four further fuselages and a number of fuselage sections had also been constructed but were never completed.

== Operational history ==
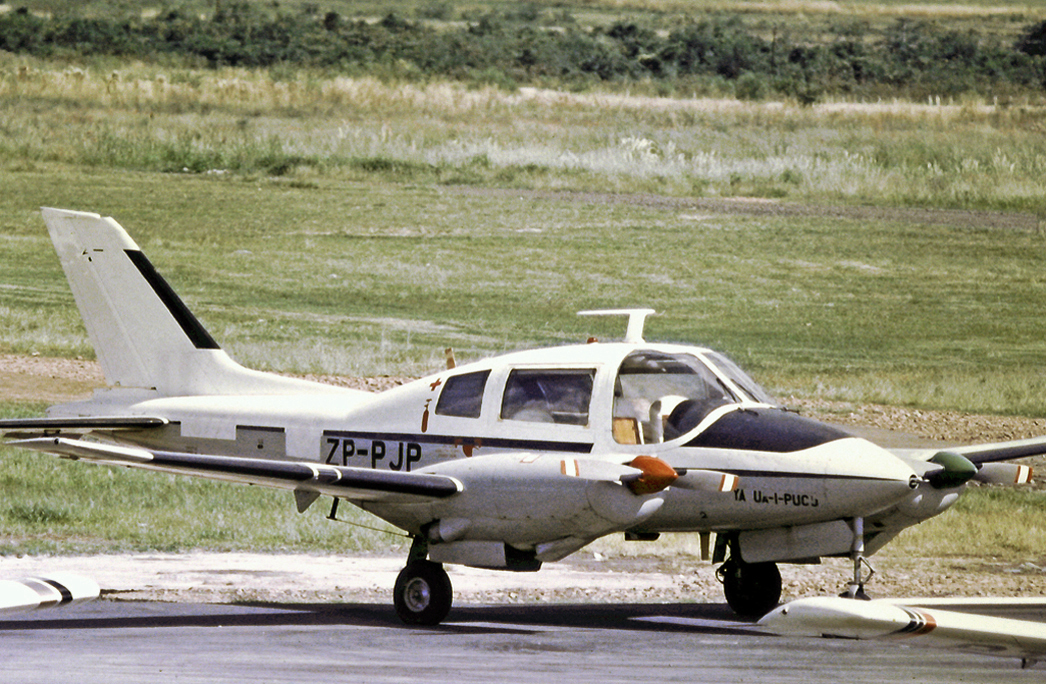
Ex RAF Basset CC.1 at Asuncion Paraguay in 1975

A competition was held at RAF Northolt in March 1963 between the B.206 and the de Havilland Devon for an aircraft to replace the Avro Anson, with the specification designed around the requirement to fly a five-man V-bomber crew, wearing full flying gear, and a ground crew member, from Britain to Malta. Beagle redesigned the aircraft to the larger B.206Y to meet this requirement, with the expectation of an initial order of at least 80 from the RAF. While the B.206 won the competition, only 20 aircraft, to be called the Beagle Basset, were ordered for the RAF. This reduced order placed the profitability of the B.206 in doubt, as Beagle had planned production on a run of at least 250 aircraft. The first delivery to RAF communications squadrons was made in June 1965. It was powered by two Rolls-Royce/Continental GIO-470 six cylinder horizontally opposed engines giving it a maximum speed of 220 mph and a range of 1,645 miles. Up to eight persons could be carried.

The Northolt aircraft were originally based at RAF Bovingdon near Watford, Hertfordshire with the Southern Communications Squadron until the 'SCS' moved to Northolt and became 207 Squadron on 4 February 1969. Another squadron, the Northern Communications Squadron, operated Bassets from RAF Topcliffe near Thirsk in North Yorkshire, moving to RAF Wyton in January 1969 when it became the Training Command Communications Squadron, becoming 26 Squadron in February that year. Most aircraft were removed from RAF service on 2 May 1974 and sold for civil use.

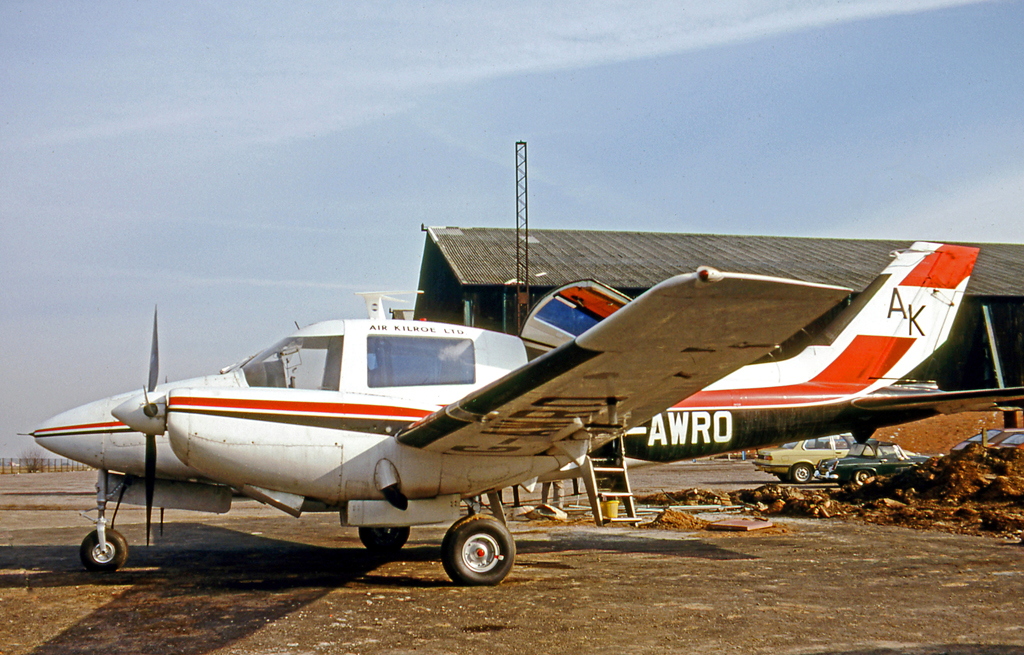
Beagle B.206 Series 2 operated by Air Kilroe on charter flights from Manchester Airport during the late 1970s.

The first civil-ordered aircraft (a Series 1 registered G-ASWJ) was delivered in May 1965 to Rolls-Royce Limited at Hucknall. In 1975, Rolls-Royce retired this aircraft and donated it to RAF Halton for use by apprentices as 8449M; it is now with the Midland Air Museum at Coventry

An unusual use was for one of the first aircraft registered G-ATHO which was bought by Maidenhead Organ Studios Limited for transporting electronic organs. Other examples were operated by UK-based air charter firms including Air Kilroe.

The type was sold to and operated by civilian firms and individuals in several countries including Australia, Brazil and the United States. Bassets were sold after RAF service to the United States and Paraguay.

== Variants ==
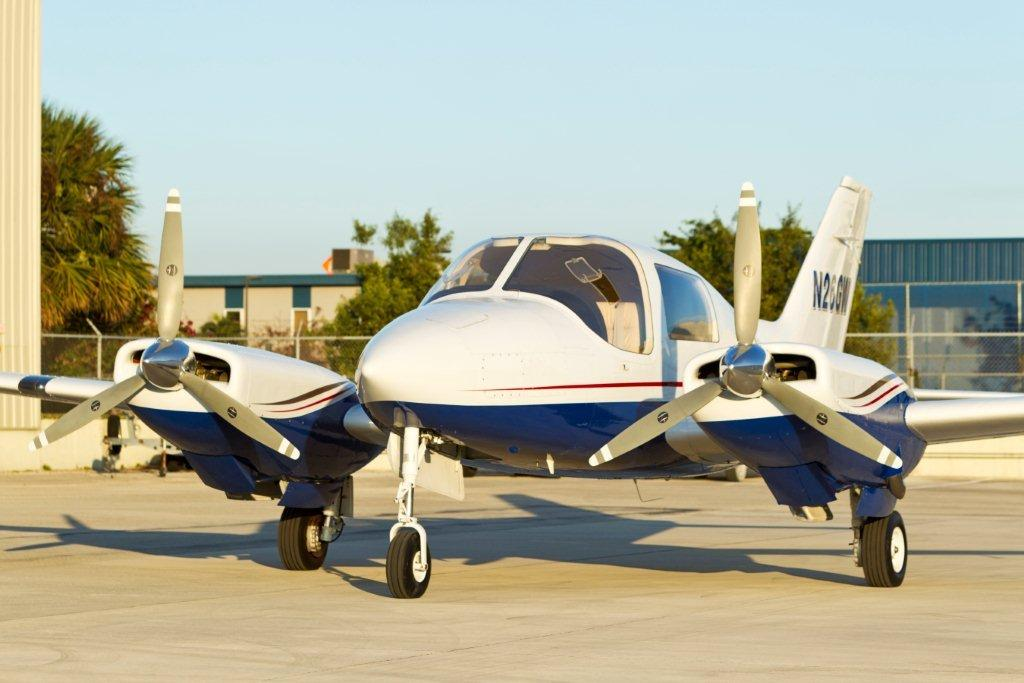
Beagle 206 Series 2 with Continental GTSIO-520-C engines

Beagle B.206X
Prototype, 1 built.
Beagle B.206Y
Larger prototype, 1 built.
Beagle B.206Z
Pre-production military version, 2 built.
Beagle B.206R (Basset CC.1)
Military version, 20 built.
Beagle B.206 Series 1 (B.206C)
Seven-seat civil production aircraft, 11 built.
Beagle B.206 Series 2 (B.206S)
Higher-performance civil production aircraft, 45 built.
Beagle B.206 Series 3
10-seat version, 2 converted from Series 2.

== Operators ==
=== Military operators ===
Syria

- Syrian Air Force – one aircraft equipped for survey work.

United Kingdom

- Royal Air Force
  - No. 26 Squadron RAF
  - No. 32 Squadron RAF
  - No. 207 Squadron RAF
  - Queen's Flight
  - Metropolitan Communication Squadron
  - Northern Communication Squadron
  - Southern Communication Squadron
  - Transport Command Communications Squadron
- Aeroplane and Armament Experimental Establishment
- Empire Test Pilot's School

=== Planned ===
South Africa

- South African Air Force ordered 18 aircraft for maritime use but the order was cancelled.

=== Civil operators ===
Australia

- Royal Flying Doctor Service

United Kingdom

- Maidenhead Organ Studios Limited

== Accidents and incidents ==
- 25 May 1964 G-ARXM The 2nd prototype (the sole B.206Y) crashed at Wisborough Green, Surrey, killing the sole occupant, after apparently attempting to perform a roll
- 6 Mar 1971. G-AVAL. Continued VFR flight into bad weather. Chouppes, near Poitiers, France.
- 5 July 1973 XS783 a Basset CC.1 of 26 Squadron was refuelled with the wrong fuel and crashed on takeoff from RAF Valley. Navigator killed and pilot seriously hurt.
- 2 May 1977 – Automotive engineer and General Motors Corporation executive Ed Cole was killed in a Beagle B.206 Series 2 registered N500KR, crashing while making a landing approach to Kalamazoo, Michigan, USA in bad weather.

== Specifications (B.206 Series 2) ==
Data from British Civil Aircraft since 1919: Volume I

General characteristics

- Crew: 1
- Capacity: 6 passengers
- Length: 33 ft 8 in (10.26 m)
- Wingspan: 45 ft 9 1/2 in (13.957 m)
- Height: 11 ft 4 in (3.45 m)
- Empty weight: 4,800 lb (2,177 kg)
- Max takeoff weight: 7,499 lb (3,401 kg)
- Powerplant: 2 × Rolls-Royce Continental GTSIO-520-C air-cooled flat-six engines, 340 hp (250 kW) each

Performance

- Maximum speed: 258 mph (415 km/h, 224 kn)
- Cruise speed: 218 mph (351 km/h, 189 kn)
- Range: 1,010 mi (1,620 km, 870 nmi) (max fuel)
- Service ceiling: 27,100 ft (8,300 m)
- Rate of climb: 1,340 ft/min (6.8 m/s)

== See also ==
Aircraft of comparable role, configuration, and era

- Aero Ae-45
- Beechcraft Baron
- Cessna 310
- Let L-200 Morava

Related lists

- List of aircraft of the Royal Air Force
