= Scottish Aviation Bulldog =

British training aircraft

Bulldog
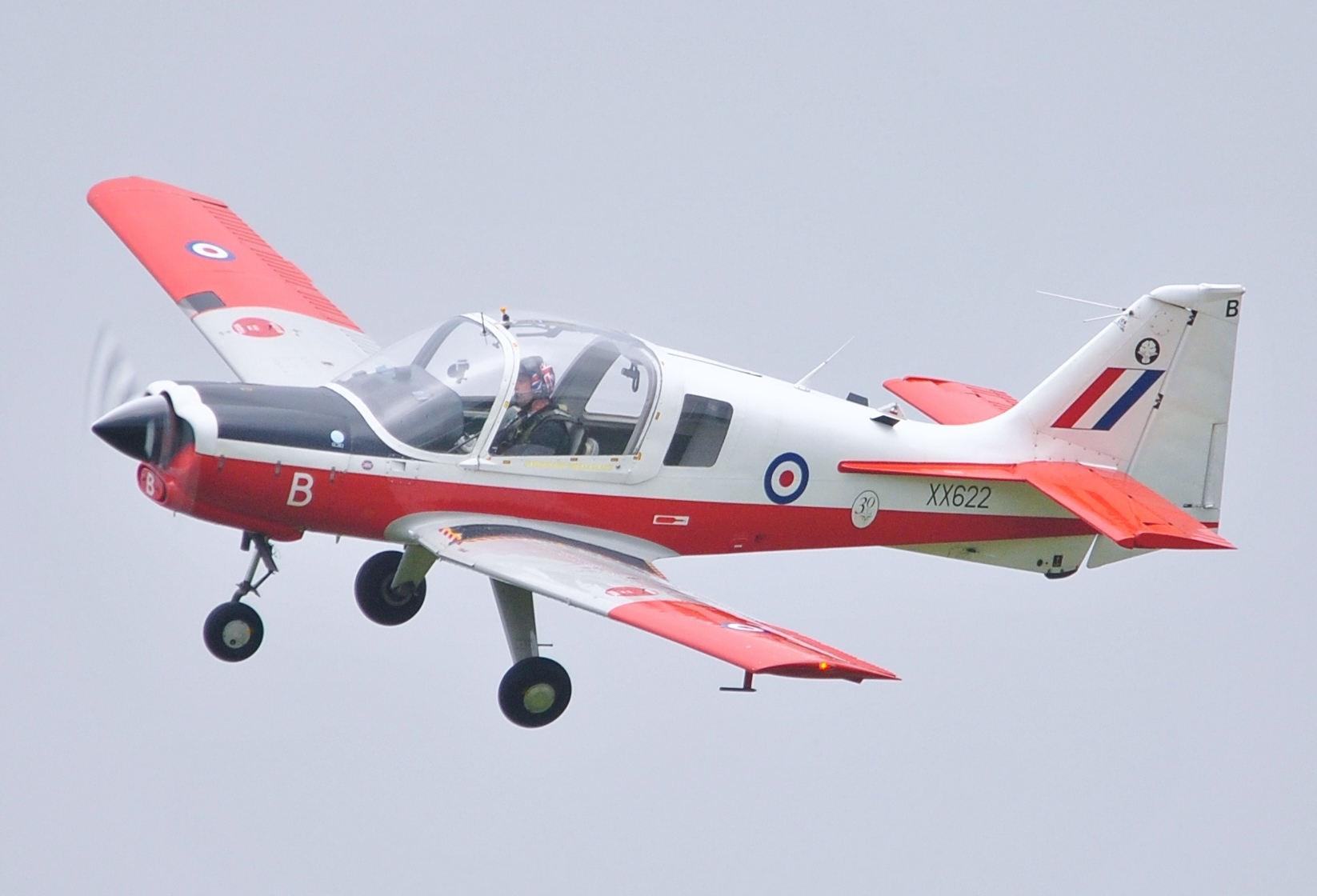
- Scottish Aviation Bulldog, arriving at Shoreham Airshow 2012

General information
- Type: Basic trainer with aerobatic capability
- Manufacturer: Beagle Aircraft/Scottish Aviation
- Status: Active
- Primary user: Royal Air Force
- Number built: 328

History
- Manufactured: 1969–1982
- Introduction date: 1971
- First flight: 19 May 1969
- Developed from: Beagle Pup

The Scottish Aviation Bulldog is a British two-seat side-by-side (with optional third seat) training aircraft designed by Beagle Aircraft as the B.125 Bulldog.

The prototype Bulldog flew on 19 May 1969 at Shoreham Airport. The first order for the type was for 78 from the Swedish Air Board. Before any production aircraft were built, Beagle Aircraft ceased trading and the production rights for the aircraft, with the Swedish order, were taken over by Scottish Aviation (Bulldog) Limited. All subsequent aircraft were built at Prestwick Airport by Scottish Aviation, and later by British Aerospace.

== Operational history ==
=== Sweden ===
The first 58 aircraft (known as the SK 61A and SK 61B) were delivered to the Swedish Air Force in 1971. Twenty more aircraft were delivered to the Swedish Army as FPL 61C in 1972, although these were transferred to the Air Force in 1989 as SK 61C. By 2001 all the Swedish aircraft had been withdrawn from military service. 26 were bought in 2004 by the Hungarian company AVIA-Rent.

=== United Kingdom ===
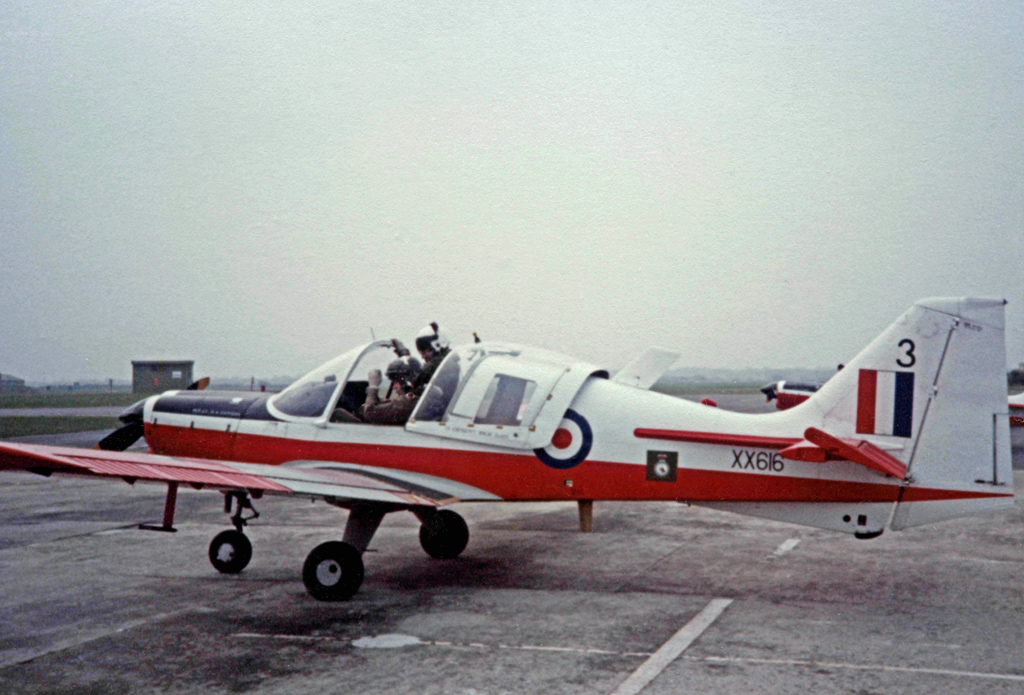
Manchester University Air Squadron Bulldog at RAF Woodvale in 1983

The largest customer was the Royal Air Force, which placed an order for 130 Bulldogs in 1972, entering service as the Bulldog T.1 in 1975. It was used by the Royal Air Force as a basic trainer, in particular as the standard aircraft of the University Air Squadrons and, later, Air Experience Flights, providing flying training. The aircraft was also used by the Royal Navy for Elementary Flying Training (EFT) at RAF Topcliffe.

The RAF sold off its remaining Bulldog trainers in 2001 as general aviation light aircraft for a low price. They were replaced by the Grob Tutor.

== Variants ==
The following Bulldog models were produced:

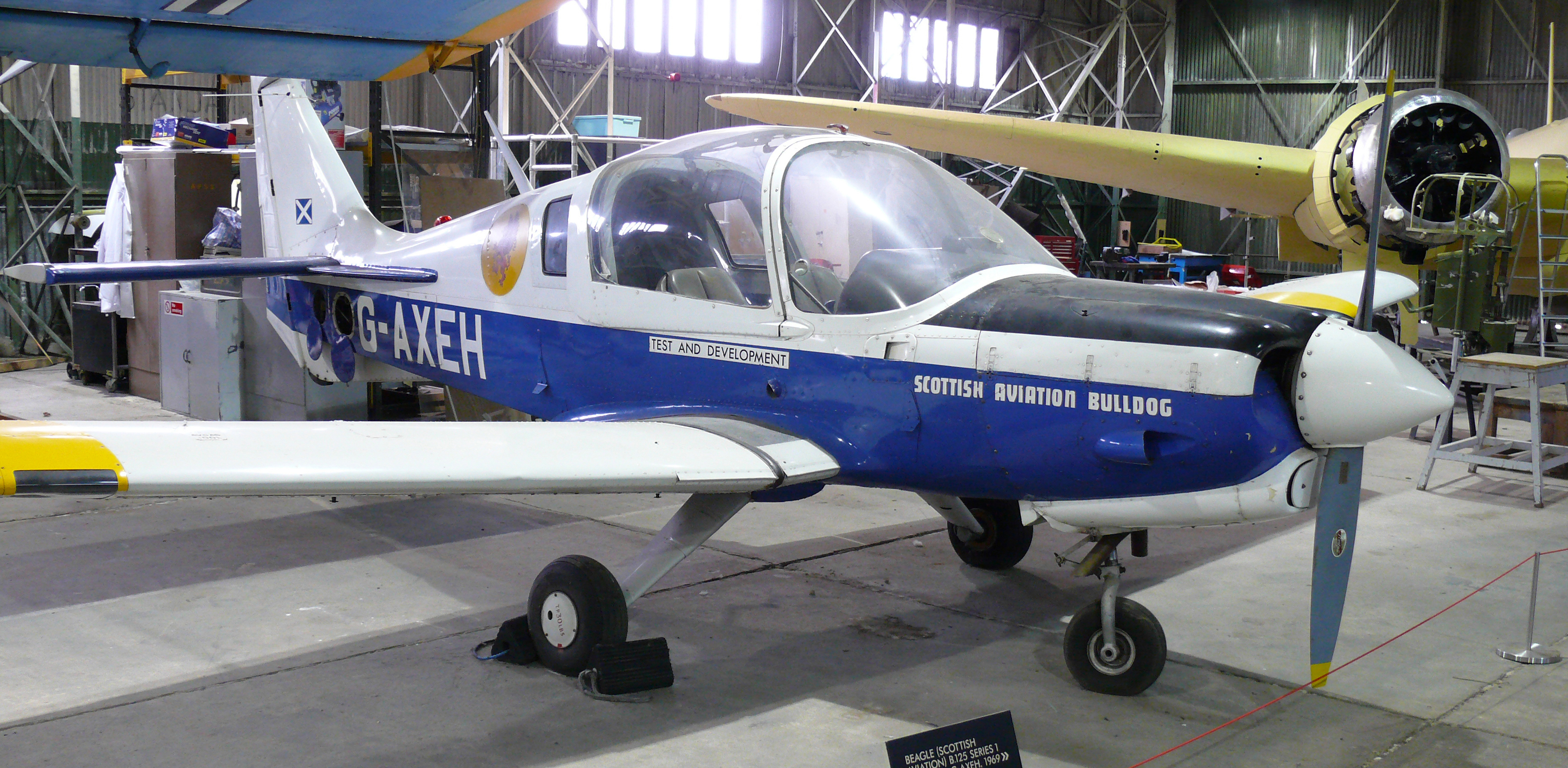
The prototype Bulldog G-AXEH in the National Museum of Flight

Bulldog Series 1
One prototype built by Beagle Aircraft (G-AXEH), one built by Scottish Aviation; now in the collection of the National Museum of Flight at East Fortune, East Lothian.
Bulldog Series 100

- Model 101: Export model for Sweden. Swedish military designation SK 61 (AF) or FPL 61 (Army). 78 built.
- Model 102: Export model for Malaysia. 15 built.
- Model 103: Export model for Kenya. Five built.
- Model 104: Refurbished second prototype (G-AXIG)
- Model 121: Primary trainer for the Royal Air Force. RAF designation Bulldog T.1. 130 built, five of which transferred (sold) to the Armed Forces of Malta in 2000.
- Model 122: Export model for Ghana. Six built.
- Model 122A: Export model for Ghana. Seven built.
- Model 123: Export model for Nigeria. 37 built.
- Model 124: Company demonstrator (G-ASAL). Used for weapons trials.
- Model 125: Export model for Jordan. 13 built.
- Model 125A: Export model for Royal Jordanian Air Force. Nine built.
- Model 126: Export model for Lebanon. Six built.
- Model 127: Export model for Kenya. Nine built.
- Model 128: Export model for Royal Hong Kong Auxiliary Air Force. Two built.
- Model 129: One aircraft for a civil customer in Venezuela (YV-375-CP).
- Model 1210 : Export model for Botswana. Six built. Light attack variant with underwing hard points

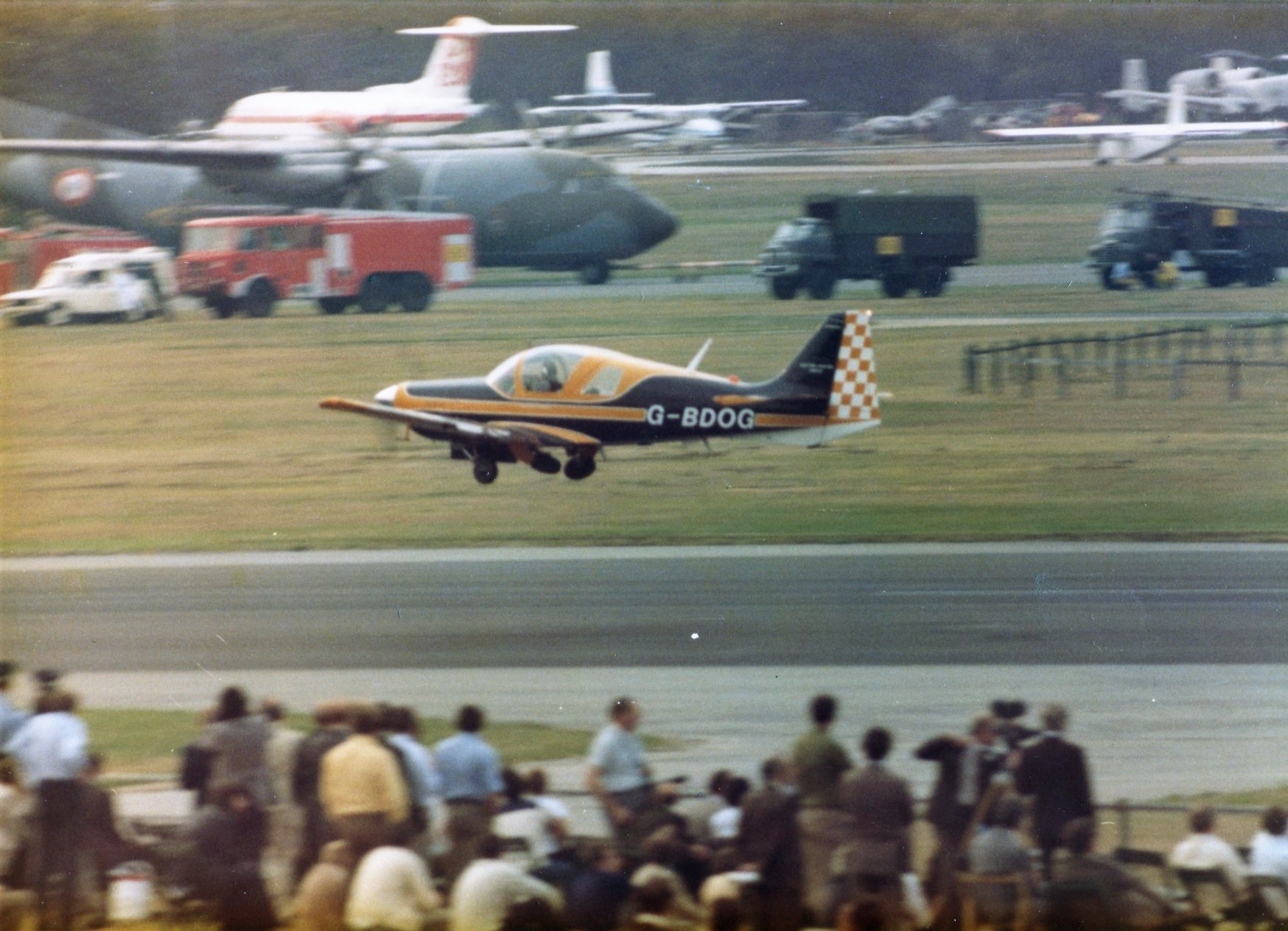
The Scottish Aviation BullFinch taking off at Farnborough International Airshow, 1978

Bulldog Series 200
Four-seat variant with retractable undercarriage. One prototype built (G-BDOG). Also known as the Bullfinch in civilian guise.

== Operators ==
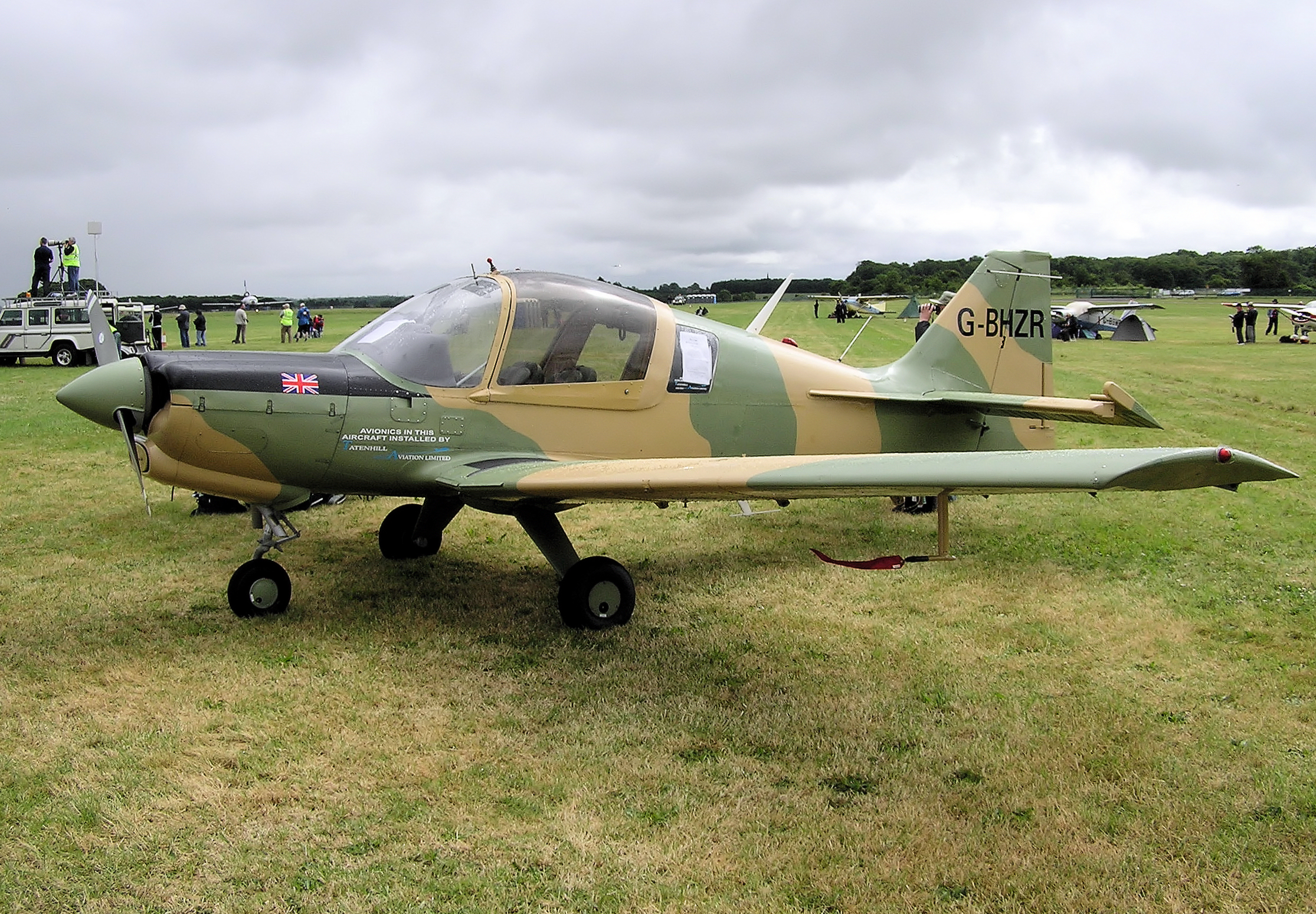
Privately owned Scottish Aviation Bulldog Series 120, formerly of the Botswana Air Force and in their colours, at an English air rally in 2005

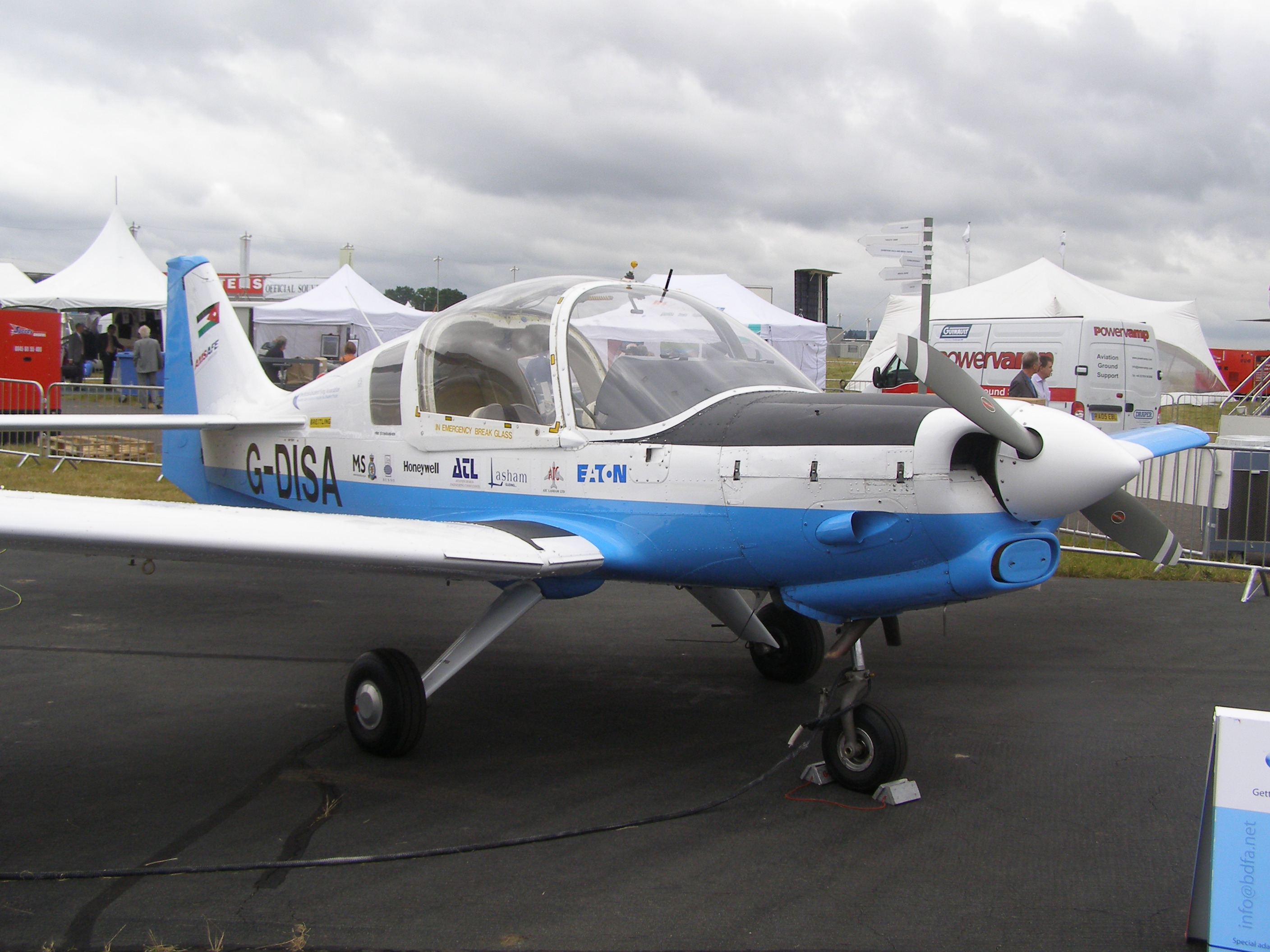
Former Royal Jordanian Air Force Bulldog now operated by the British Disabled Flying Association (now trading as Aerobility) on display at Farnborough Airshow 2008

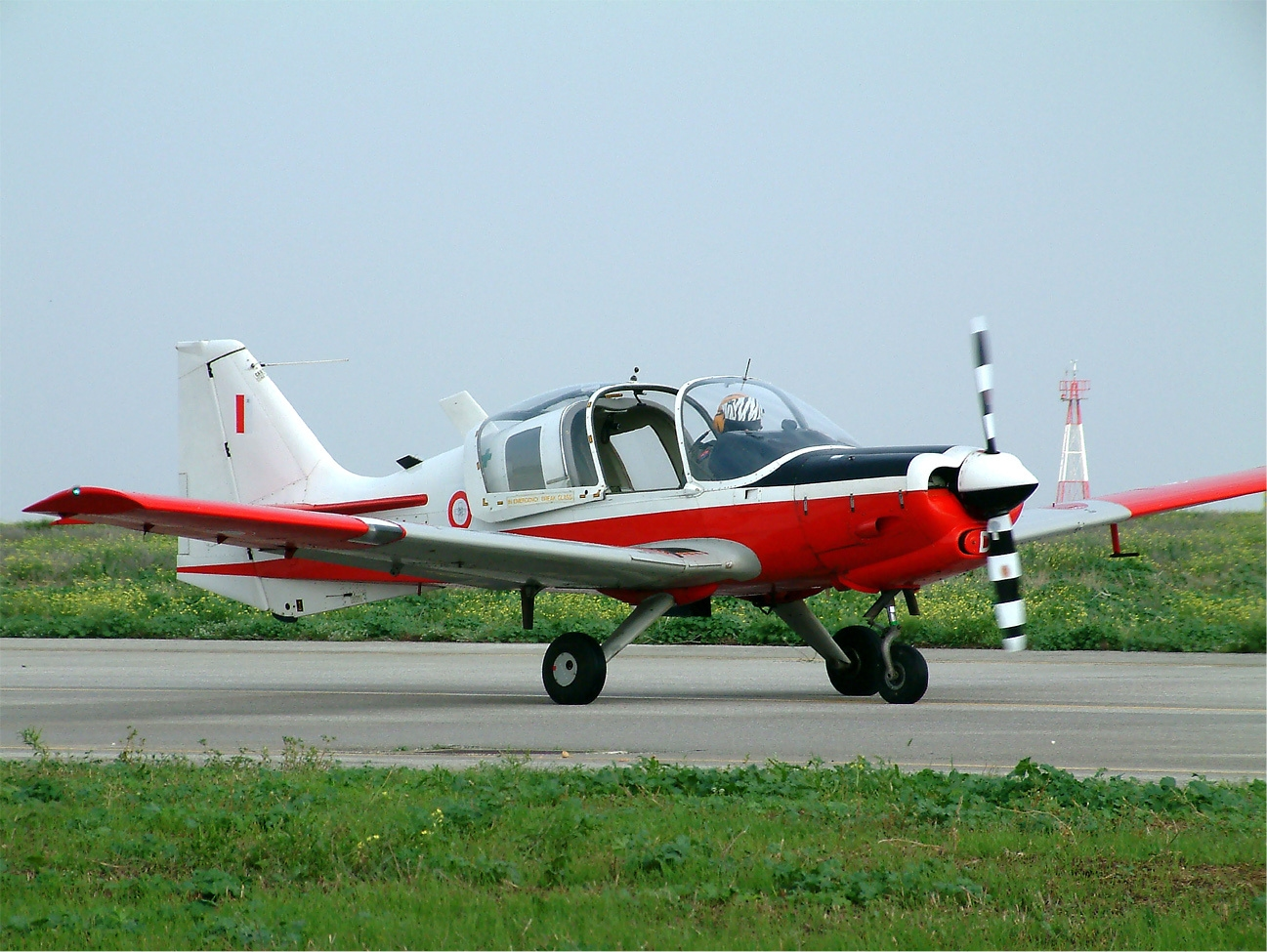
Bulldog of the Maltese Air Wing in 2003

=== Military operators ===
Lebanon

- Lebanese Air Force

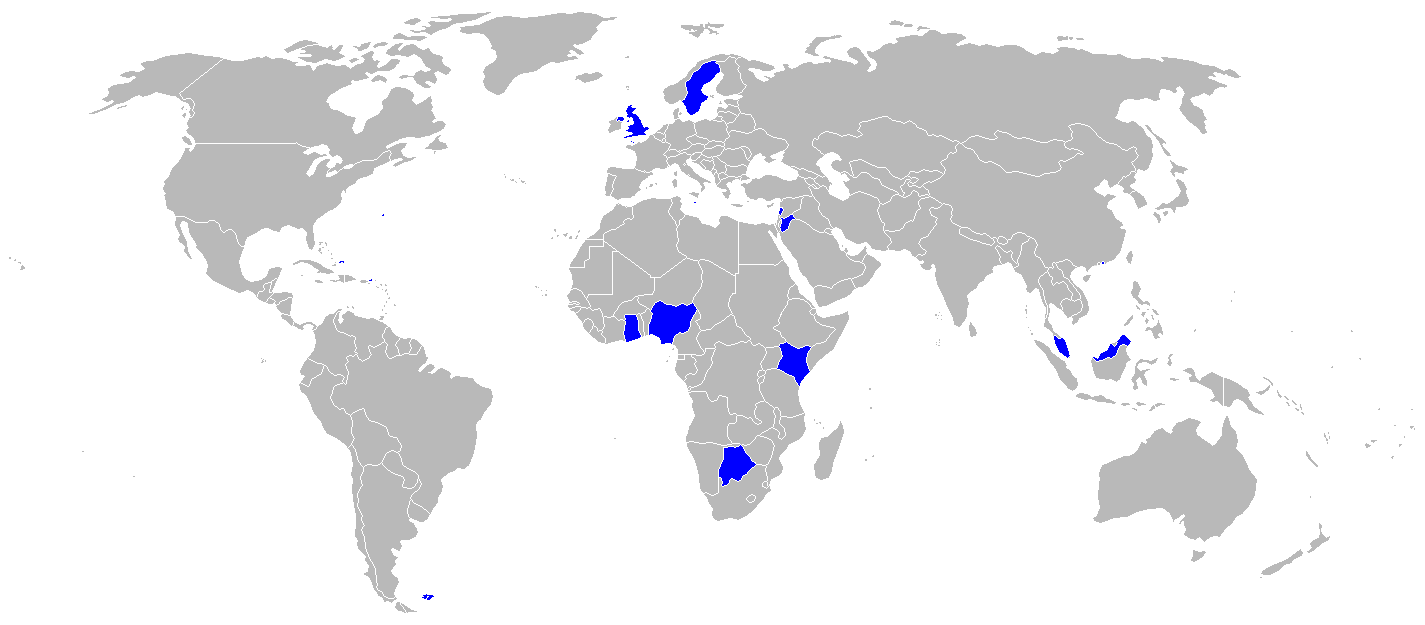
Operators of the Bulldog

=== Former military operators ===
Botswana

- Botswana Air Force

Ghana

- Ghana Air Force

Jordan

- Royal Jordanian Air Force

Kenya

- Kenya Air Force

Hong Kong

- Royal Hong Kong Auxiliary Air Force

Malaysia

- Royal Malaysian Air Force

Malta

- Maltese Air Wing

Nigeria

- Nigerian Air Force

Sweden

- Swedish Air Force
- Swedish Army

United Kingdom

- Royal Air Force

=== Former civil operators ===
Sweden

- Lund University

== Aircraft on display ==
United Kingdom

- Bulldog 104 G-AXIG at National Museum of Scotland, Edinburgh, Scotland.
- Bulldog 125 G-BDIN at South Yorkshire Aircraft Museum, Doncaster, England.
- Bulldog T.1 XX634 at Newark Air Museum, Nottinghamshire.
- Bulldog T.1 XX654 at Royal Air Force Museum Cosford, Shropshire.
- Bulldog T.1 XX669 at South Yorkshire Aircraft Museum.
- Bulldog T.1 XX520 at 172 (Haywards Heath) Squadron Air Training Corps (Haywards Heath TA Centre), Sussex
- Bulldog T.1 XX637 at Ulster Aviation Society, Maze Long Kesh, Lisburn, Northern Ireland (Current markings are a XX530 tribute)

Malta

- Bulldog T.1 XX696 at Malta Aviation Museum, Attard, Malta (Current markings are AS0021)

== Specifications (Bulldog Series 120) ==
Data from Bulldog Series 120 Owner's Manual

General characteristics

- Crew: 2, model 101 has 3
- Length: 23 ft 3.06 in (7.0881 m)
- Wingspan: 33 ft 1.85 in (10.1054 m)
- Height: 8 ft 11.5 in (2.731 m)
- Wing area: 129.4 sq ft (12.02 m^{2})
- Aspect ratio: 8.4
- Airfoil: NACA 63_{2}615
- Empty weight: 1,475 lb (669 kg)
- Max takeoff weight: 2,350 lb (1,066 kg)
- Powerplant: 1 × Lycoming IO-360-A1B6 4-cylinder air-cooled horizontally-opposed piston engine, 200 hp (150 kW)
- Propellers: 2-bladed Hartzell constant speed propeller

Performance

- Maximum speed: 130 kn (150 mph, 240 km/h)
- Stall speed: 54 kn (62 mph, 100 km/h)
- Never exceed speed: 185 kn (213 mph, 343 km/h)
- Range: 540 nmi (620 mi, 1,000 km)
- Service ceiling: 16,000 ft (4,900 m)
- g limits: +6g -3g, with no longer than 15 seconds sustained inverted flight.
- Rate of climb: 1,034 ft/min (5.25 m/s)
- Wing loading: 18.2 lb/sq ft (89 kg/m^{2})

Armament

- All armament is optional. The Bulldog was designed so that it could be fitted with four hard points. These armaments were tested on company demonstrator aircraft G-ASAL. They were never used in RAF service although some weapons training was done on the Bulldog trainers in Sweden. Although hardpoints are available, there is no provision for production weapons launch control systems in the Bulldog.

- Up to a 290 kg (640 lb) bomb load.
- .30 in (7.62mm) machine guns.

== See also ==
Aircraft of comparable role, configuration, and era

- Aermacchi SF.260
- Cessna T-41
- PAC CT/4 (Pacific Aerospace Limited)
- Saab 91 Safir
- Utva 75
- Valmet L-70 Vinka
- Grumman American AA-1
- Zlín Z 42

Related lists

- List of aircraft of the Royal Air Force
