= Beagle Pup =

1967 light aircraft family by Beagle

B.121 Pup
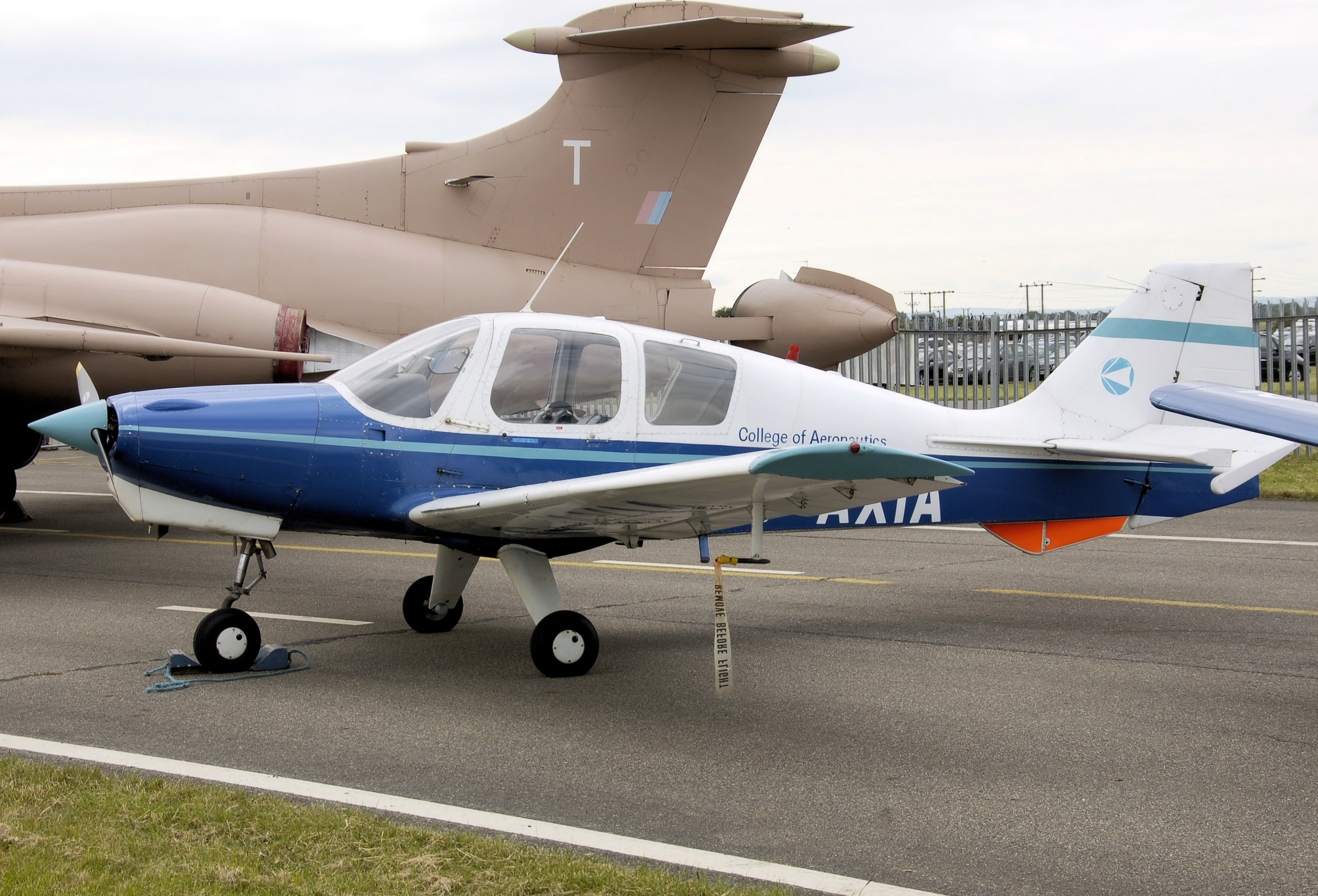

General information
- Type: General Aviation
- Manufacturer: Beagle Aircraft Limited
- Number built: 175

History
- Manufactured: 1967–1970
- Introduction date: 1968
- First flight: 8 April 1967
- Variant: Beagle Bulldog

The Beagle B.121 Pup is a 1960s British 2–4 seat single-engined training and touring aircraft built by Beagle Aircraft Limited at Shoreham Airport and Rearsby Aerodrome.

== Design ==
The Pup was designed as a single-engined all-metal two-seat aerobatic aircraft or a four-seat touring aircraft. The Pup was more spacious than its direct competitors and was more of a "pilot's aeroplane"; it was a more complex design to manufacture and was also corrosion proofed throughout (usually then only an option on US-built competitors). For these reasons it was correspondingly more expensive to build, yet was sold at a competitive price.

Beagle Aircraft Ltd chose to build the Pup following a market survey which demonstrated a global requirement for a modern, all-metal 2–4 seat training/touring aircraft to replace aging Tiger Moths and Pipers used by flying clubs. American manufacturers were already fulfilling this demand with aircraft such as the Cessna 150, 172 and the Piper Cherokee.

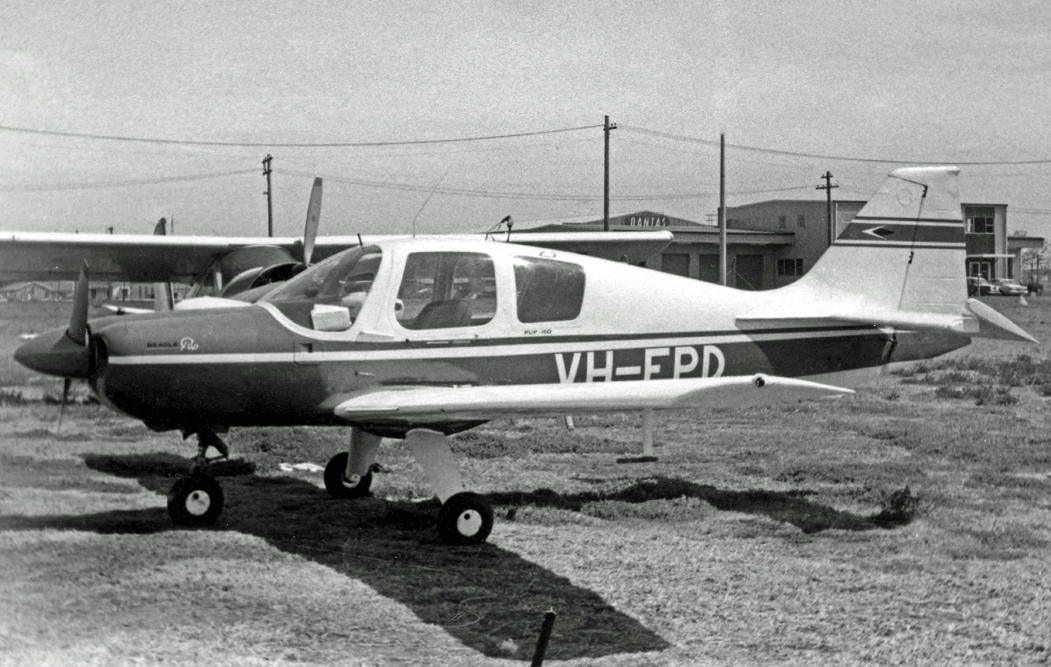
Pup Series 2 with a 150 h.p. engine at Sydney Airport in October 1970

== Development ==
The prototype Pup (a Series 1 G-AVDF) first flew from Shoreham Airport on 8 April 1967. The second prototype, the first more powerful Pup 150 (G-AVLM) with seating for an extra adult, was first flown on 4 October 1967, followed by the third prototype, another Series 2 (G-AVLN), on 17 January 1968. The Series 2 aircraft were fitted with an enlarged rudder which became standard on all production aircraft. G-AVLM was converted during 1968 to become the Series 3 prototype aircraft with a further enlarged rudder.

Because these aircraft types were identical from behind the engine firewall (as commonality reduces costs), the Series 1 was heavier than it needed to be. This penalized its performance which was described as less than "sporty". Another issue affecting the Pup was unreliability, due to both poor design and workmanship, and the shortage of spare parts. These problems included fuel leaks, cockpit door failures and brake and undercarriage issues.

However, the main issue as the Pup developed was the cost of production. Flight magazine, commenting on the uneconomic construction, said that the Pup "appears to be designed not for production but as a one-off special in which cost was no object". Beagle had planned to achieve a basic manhour figure of 780 hours per aircraft by the 250th aircraft, but they were well behind the learning curve to achieve this. It was estimated in November 1969 that the production cost per aircraft for the first 150 was £8,850, over double the selling price, and that break-even would be achieved after 4,000 aircraft.

== Production and sales ==
The first delivery (a Series 1) was to the Shoreham Flying School on 12 April 1968. The aircraft was popular and sold to flying clubs and private users worldwide. Deliveries were made to civilian operators in several countries including Australia, Iraq, Sweden and Switzerland. The Series 3 variant, a four-seater, was developed for the Iranian Civil Air Training Organisation.

By 1969 production had increased at Shoreham to one Pup a day; aircraft were flown to either Rearsby Aerodrome or Cambridge Airport for painting and finishing.

In December 1969 the government withdrew financial support for Beagle and the company was placed in receivership. Over 250 Pups were on order but Beagle production ceased with the 152nd aircraft. Some remaining nearly-completed aircraft were finished at a variety of locations, the last being HB-NBA (s/n B121-177), first registered 8 March 1977, making a total of 175 Pups completed. About 40 incomplete fuselages were sold as scrap.

== Restoring the G-AVDF prototype ==
The original Beagle Pup prototype (G-AVDF) flew over 200 hours of test and promotional flights between 1967 and 1968. At the end of 1968 it was modified and used as an engine testbed for the Beagle Bulldog, but when the Bulldog flew in May 1969, G-AVDF became surplus to requirements and was partially dismantled and put into storage.

In 1993, while looking for a restoration project, David Collings, Beagle Pup pilot and enthusiast, found G-AVDF at Brooklands, and bought the aircraft with the intention of restoring it to flight. The project was put on hold until 2015 when restoration work began, and finally in the summer of 2020, the original Beagle Pup prototype took to the skies again.

== Bulldog ==
It was always the intention of Beagle to make a military version of the Pup to replace the Chipmunk in particular. Earlier proposals for this were superseded following the interest of the Swedish Armed Forces in 1967 when they assessed the Pup 150. In consequence the design was improved significantly and evolved into the Beagle B.125 Bulldog with a 200 hp (150 kW) Lycoming engine. The first prototype made its first flight at Shoreham on 19 May 1969 and on 12 June 1969 the Swedes ordered 58 Bulldogs with an option on 45 more; this was followed by two further orders from Zambia (8) and Kenya (5). The Bulldog was also being assessed by the RAF, the RAAF and the Iraqi Air Force at the time when Beagle ceased operations.

Only one prototype aircraft was completed by Beagle (with another largely complete); in 1970 the design and production was taken over by Scottish Aviation together with the Swedish order.

== Variants ==
Pup Series 1 (Pup 100)
Powered by a 100 hp (75 kW) Rolls-Royce Continental O-200A engine
Pup Series 2 (Pup 150)
Powered by a 150 hp (110 kW) Lycoming O-320-A2B engine
Pup Series 3 (Pup 160)
Powered by a 160 hp (120 kW) Lycoming O-320-D2C engine
Bulldog
Military training version, powered by a 200 hp (150 kW) Lycoming AEIO-360-AIB6 engine, 2 prototypes only built by Beagle, the second of which first flew at Prestwick on 14 February 1971.

== Operators ==
=== Civil operators ===
Iran

- Iranian Civil Air Training Organisation

United Kingdom

- Derby Aero Club
- Shoreham Flying School
- Surrey and Kent Flying Club, Biggin Hill Aerodrome
- SkySport UK
- Southend Flying Club (G-AXJI)

== Specifications (Pup Series 2) ==
Data from Jane's All the World's Aircraft 1969–70

General characteristics

- Crew: 1
- Capacity: 2 passengers
- Length: 23 ft 2 in (7.06 m)
- Wingspan: 31 ft 0 in (9.45 m)
- Height: 7 ft 6 in (2.29 m)
- Wing area: 119.5 sq ft (11.10 m^{2})
- Aspect ratio: 8.04:1
- Empty weight: 1,090 lb (494 kg)
- Max takeoff weight: 1,925 lb (873 kg)
- Fuel capacity: 24 imp gal (29 US gal; 110 L)
- Powerplant: 1 × Lycoming O-320-A2B air-cooled flat-four, 150 hp (110 kW)
- Propellers: 2-bladed Sensenich M.74 DMS-0-60, 6 ft 2 in (1.88 m) diameter

Performance

- Maximum speed: 138 mph (222 km/h, 120 kn)
- Cruise speed: 115 mph (185 km/h, 100 kn) (econ cruise, 55% power)
- Stall speed: 56 mph (90 km/h, 49 kn) (flaps down)
- Never exceed speed: 195 mph (314 km/h, 169 kn)
- Range: 440 mi (710 km, 380 nmi)
- Service ceiling: 14,700 ft (4,500 m)
- Rate of climb: 800 ft/min (4.1 m/s)
- Wing loading: 16.1 lb/sq ft (79 kg/m^{2})
- Take-off run to 50 ft (15 m): 1,480 feet (450 m)
- Landing run (from 50 ft (15 m)): 1,410 ft (430 m)

== See also ==
- Piper PA-28 Cherokee
