= Beagle Aircraft =

British light aircraft manufacturer active 1960-1969

Beagle Aircraft Limited
- Industry: Aerospace, Engineering
- Founded: 1960 (as British Executive & General Aviation Limited)
- Defunct: 1969
- Fate: Placed into receivership, assets disposed.
- Headquarters: Shoreham, Sussex, UK
- Parent: Pressed Steel Company

Beagle Aircraft Limited was a British light aircraft manufacturer. The company produced the Airedale, Terrier, Beagle 206, Husky and the Pup. It had factories at Rearsby in Leicestershire and Shoreham in Sussex. The company was dissolved in 1969.

== History ==
The British Executive & General Aviation Limited (trading as BEAGLE) was formed in 1960 when Peter Masefield left his post as Managing Director of Bristol Aircraft when that company was merged with others to form British Aircraft Corporation. His intention was to set up a company to design and produce a range of light aircraft, and he persuaded the Pressed Steel Company to invest in this project. An aircraft design office was created at Shoreham to design the Beagle 206, which was intended to be the company's flagship product.

Beagle took over two separate aircraft manufacturers, Auster Aircraft Company of Rearsby, Leicestershire and F.G Miles Limited of Shoreham, Sussex, both of which also had design offices. Initially the arrangement with F.G Miles was a "technical association" as Fred Miles had no intention of selling out to Beagle but eventually George Miles was appointed Technical Director for the Beagle Group and F.G Miles was a director of Beagle-Miles, with a formal takeover being completed in February 1961.

Initially the three parts of the company operated independently, the Rearsby factory as Beagle-Auster Limited and the Shoreham factory as Beagle-Miles Limited. This did not last long and the three parts of the company were merged as Beagle Aircraft Limited in 1962.

The company lacked direction from the start, with poor strategic decisions made based on over-optimistic predictions while projects were delayed and costs spiralled. Masefield had a vision of producing large numbers, possibly between 400 and 1000 aircraft per year, of many different types of light aircraft. At the same time he was wildly optimistic about the ease of producing such numbers, seemingly ignoring the costs involved. The Miles brothers had the view that Masefield was "intent on creating an organisation out of all proportion to what it was trying to achieve". The decision to build the Airedale and Terrier as "interim" aircraft was a costly error; by March 1962 it had cost £511,000 to produce the first 25 Airedales, which sold with difficulty for a basic price of £5,500 each, with a predicted break-even figure of over 600 sales.

In 1962 a net loss of £2.1 million was recorded and Pressed Steel had already given thought to pulling out. In July 1963, George Miles resigned, saying "Manufacturing plans and policies have been wild and chaotic. The present situation ... is obviously hopelessly uneconomic." In 1965 the parent company Pressed Steel was acquired by the British Motor Corporation, who reviewed the involvement in light aircraft manufacturing and requested financial help from the British Government. The British government bought Beagle in December 1966 and provided the help needed. When the company needed more financial help in 1969, the Government put the company into receivership amidst much Parliamentary recrimination. The Receiver tried to revive and sell the company (now renamed Beagle Aircraft (1969) Limited), but failed and the company assets were disposed of by the liquidator.

== Aircraft ==
The Beagle 206 was a twin piston-engined design evolved from the Bristol 220 project which Peter Masefield had tried to persuade Bristol Aircraft to make. When he left Bristols he bought the design rights to form the foundation of Beagle as it was expected that up to 120 would be ordered by the RAF. However, the RAF specification changed continually as did the required number of aircraft and the ultimate order was only for 20 aircraft at the unit price that Beagle had given for 30 aircraft. Owing to the change in the RAF specification, the first Beagle 206 (designed by the Miles team in 82,500 man-hours) was then redesigned and "productionised" by the Beagle design office at Shoreham (in an additional 150,000 man-hours of design). The Beagle 206 was only made in small numbers from 1961 to 1969; this was to have been the company's flagship aircraft but sales were always difficult - 79 were flown and several were unsold at the time of liquidation.

The first aircraft made by Beagle were developed from Auster designs: the Airedale, Terrier and D5/180 Husky. The Airedale and Terrier were intended as stop-gap designs to keep production shops busy and to be sold whilst more modern designs were developed However, Beagle lost almost £500,000 on the Airedale, due to its old design, poor performance and high cost; the Terrier was also not profitable, due to the extensive number of man-hours in conversion and, again, the age of the design. The Beagle Husky was made in very small numbers and each was sold at a significant loss, while the Beagle Mark Eleven project was another expensive sideline. In 1968, the Auster assets (including all spares, jigs and partly completed airframes) were sold to Hants and Sussex Aviation in order to make room for the production of the Pup.

In 1967 the single-engined Beagle Pup made its first flight and was made and sold in greater numbers until the company's bankruptcy. The receiver sold a number of incomplete Pup aircraft which were then completed by other companies. At the time of the company's bankruptcy in 1969, the military Bulldog was being developed from the Pup by Beagle; Bulldog production was then completed by Scottish Aviation at their Prestwick factory following the demise of the Beagle Aircraft company. At the turn of the 21st Century, many Bulldogs were being sold by air forces to civilian operators, in much the same way that Austers were transferred from Army or RAF squadrons during the 1940s and 1950s.

- Beagle Husky - single-engined high-winged monoplane, a re-designated Auster D5/180
- Beagle A.61 Terrier – single-engined high-winged monoplane
- Beagle A.109 Airedale – single-engined high-winged monoplane
- Beagle Mark Eleven - re-engined Auster AOP.9 single-engined high-winged monoplane
- Beagle B.206 – twin-engined low-winged light transport aircraft
- Beagle B.206R Basset – military version of the B.206
- Beagle M.218 – twin-engined light transport aircraft
- Beagle B.121 Pup – single-engined low-winged light aircraft
- Beagle B.125 Bulldog – military version of the Pup, built by Scottish Aviation after the company was liquidated.

Beagle also collaborated with Ken Wallis in building five Wallis WA-116 autogyros at Shoreham in 1962 for evaluation by the British Army. This collaboration ended when the British Army chose the Westland Sioux for this role.

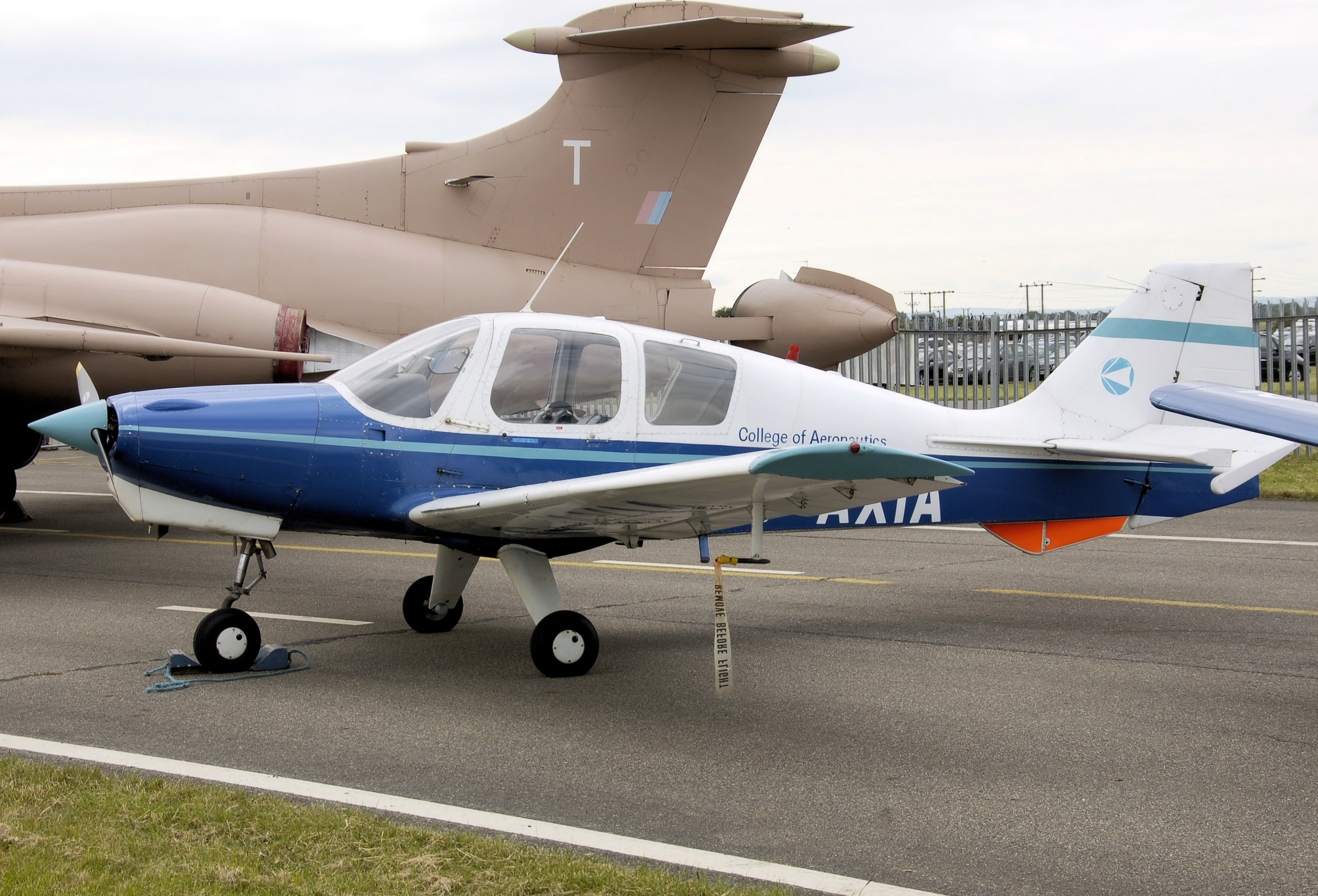
Beagle Pup, built 1969

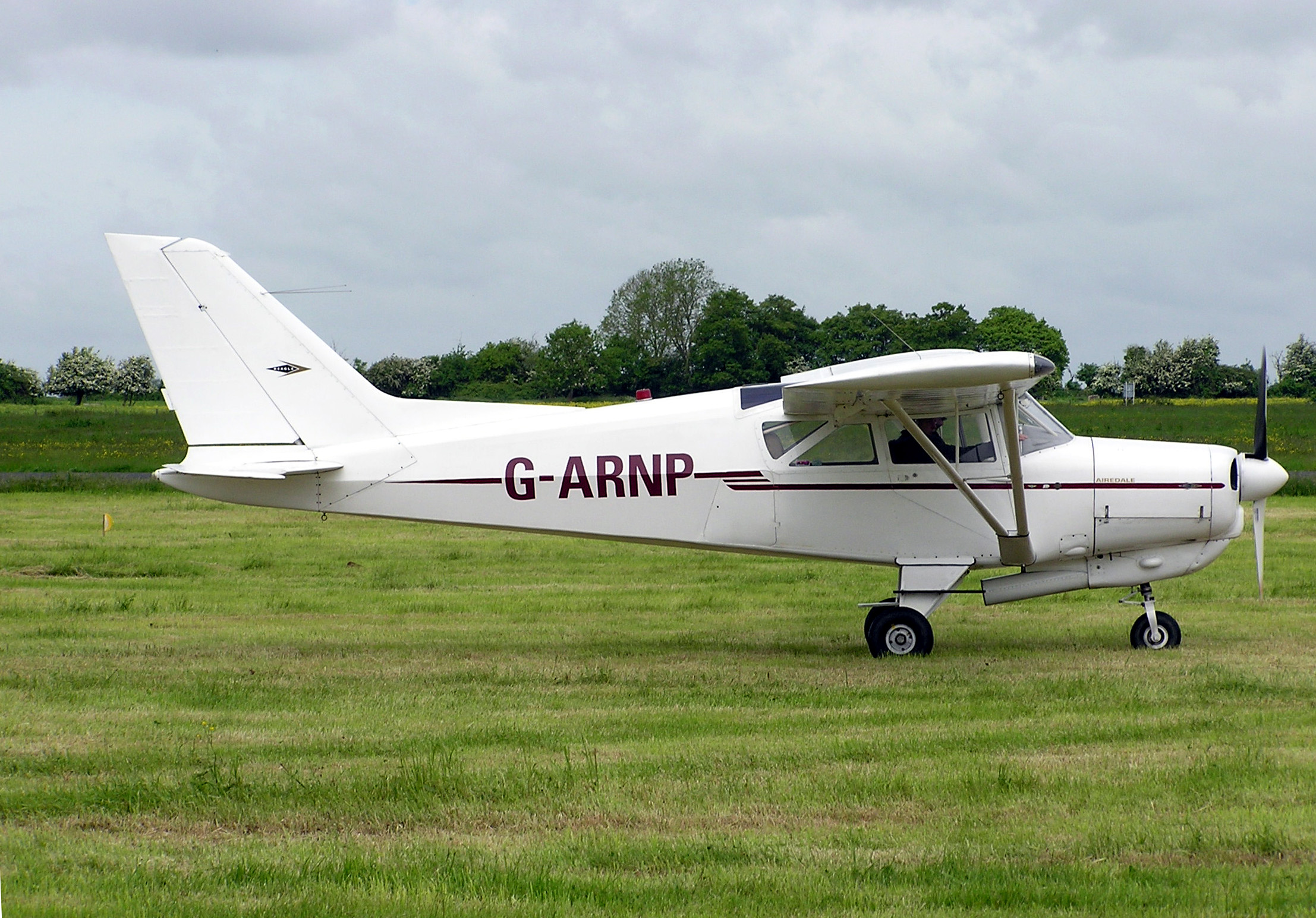
Beagle Airedale, built 1961

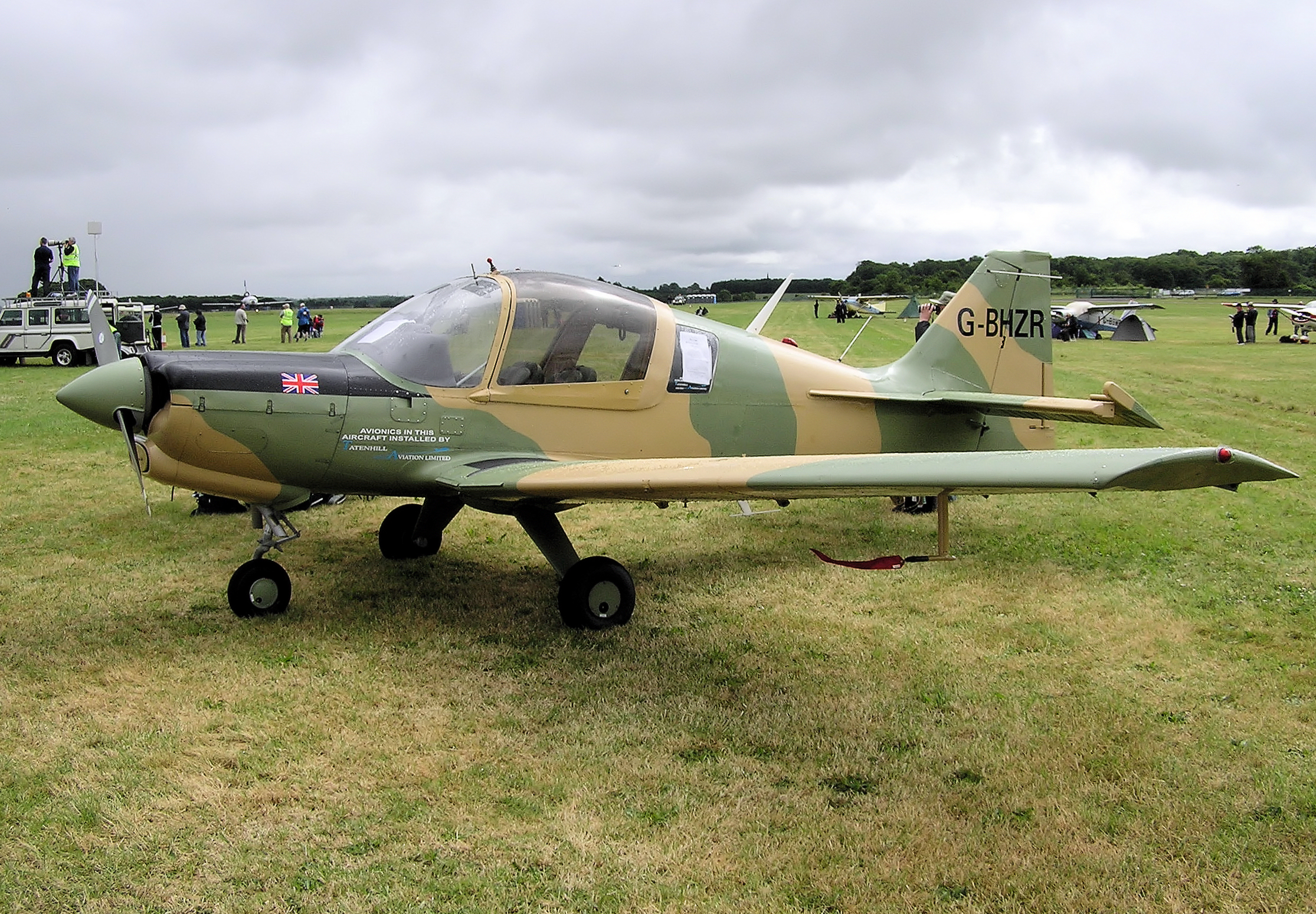
Scottish Aviation Bulldog, built 1980

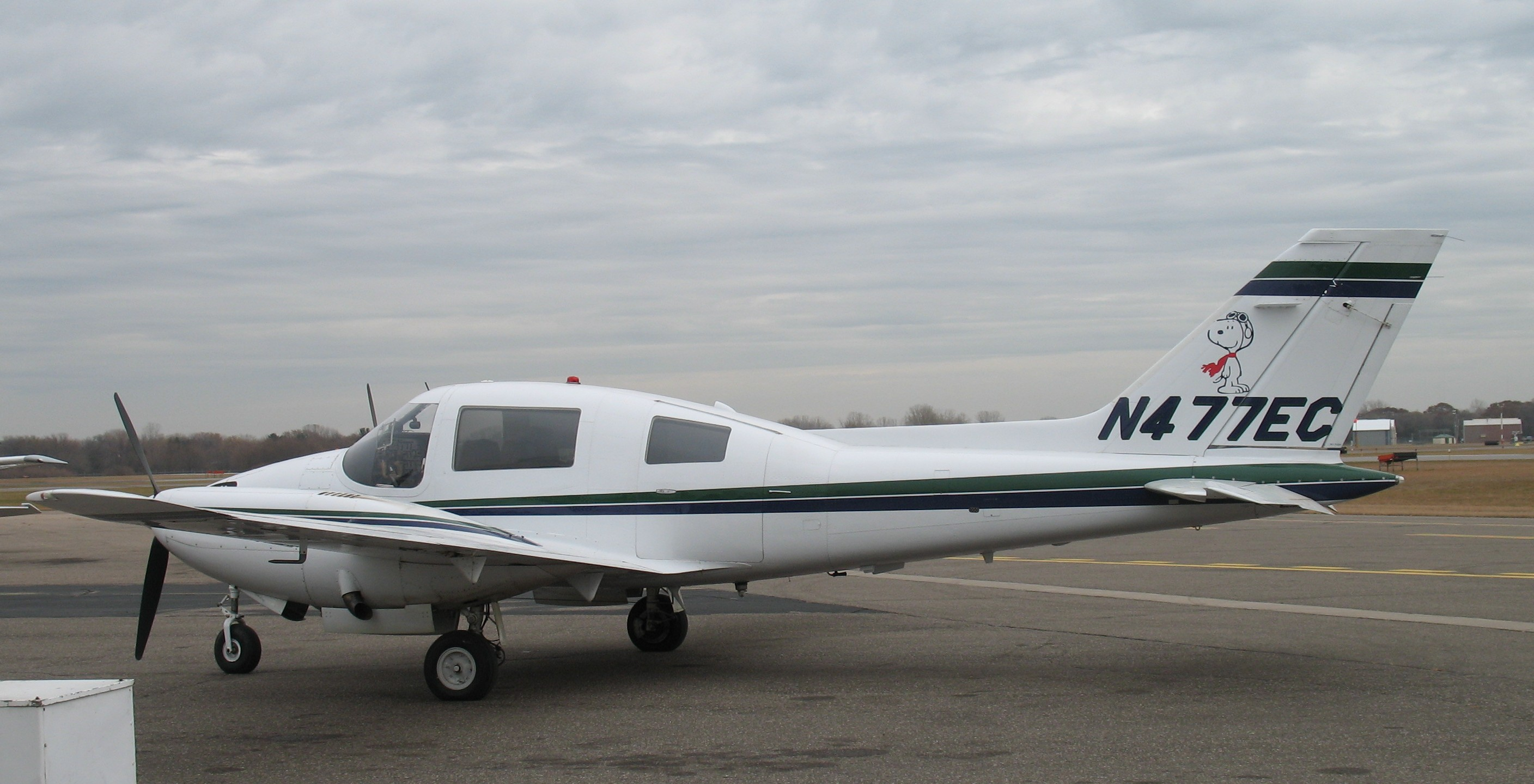
Beagle B.206, built 1969

== See also ==
- Aerospace industry in the United Kingdom
