= Rearsby =

Village in Leicestershire, England

Coordinates: 52°43′27.00″N 1°2′15.00″W

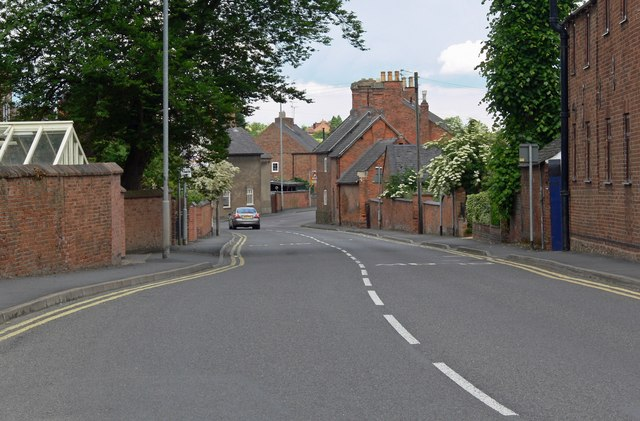

- Location within Leicestershire
- Population: 1,097
- District: Charnwood
- Shire county: Leicestershire
- Region: East Midlands
- Country: England
- Sovereign state: United Kingdom
- Post town: LEICESTER
- Postcode district: LE7
- Police: Leicestershire
- Fire: Leicestershire
- Ambulance: East Midlands
- UK Parliament: Melton and Syston

Rearsby is a village and civil parish in the Charnwood district of Leicestershire, England. It is known for its Seven Arch Bridge, and is also home to the Preachers Stone.

== Location ==
The parish has a population of about 1,000, being measured at 1,097 in the 2011 census. It is on the A607 road between Leicester and Melton Mowbray, and is just south of the River Wreake. Nearby places are East Goscote, Thrussington and Rotherby. In 2000, villagers got the approval of building a bypass for Rearsby, work started in August 2003 and by the following year the bypass was open allowing traffic to pass Rearsby without going through the village, the estimated cost of the bypass was £5.9 million. It is a village with a strong community spirit which has been shown through a long-standing publishing of the Rearsby Scene (the local village newspaper).

== Rearsby Aerodrome ==
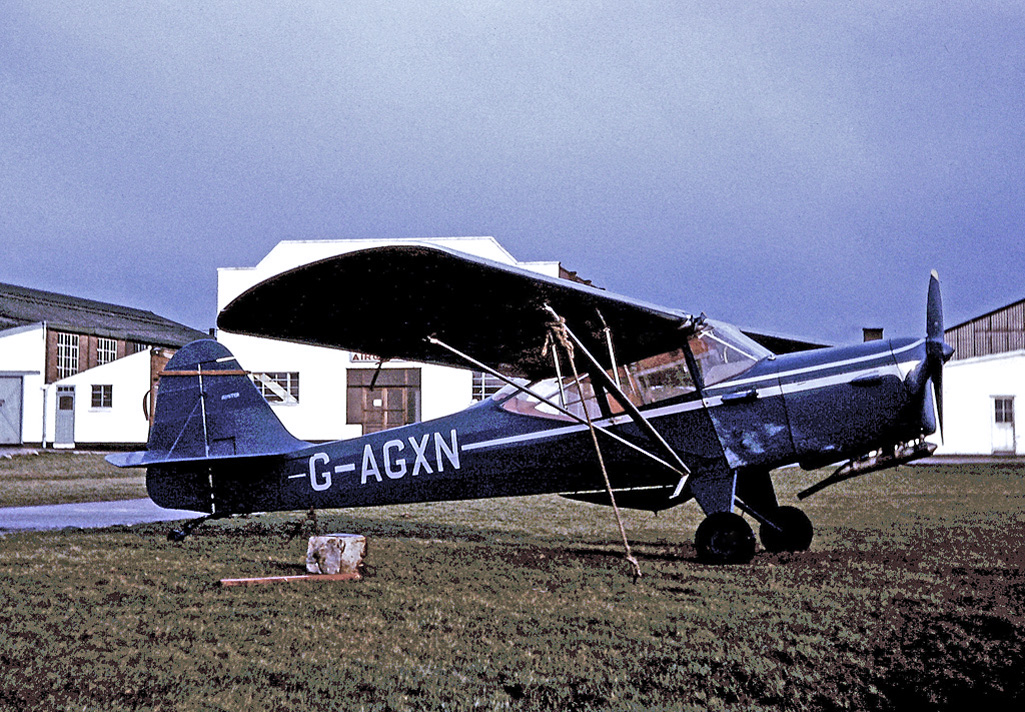
Auster Autocrat built at Rearsby in 1946, modified to J/1N Alpha and parked in front of the Auster Aircraft factory in 1966

The County Flying Club moved to Rearsby in 1938 and created an aerodrome on land owned by Sir William Lindsay Everard. Rearsby airfield soon became the home of the Taylorcraft aircraft factory, which began light aircraft manufacture in 1939. The basic aircraft design was modified to become the British Army A.O.P. (air observation post), the model being named the Auster. Following W.W.II, Taylorcraft Aeroplanes (England) Ltd changed its name to The Auster Aircraft Company Ltd. The aircraft was known as 'The All Steel Aeroplane". After initial success with the Autocrat and other models including the Aiglet and Autocar, post war civil aircraft sales slowed, particularly as there were many ex-military surplus aircraft available. In the early to mid-1960s Beagle Aircraft built the Beagle B.206 twin engined executive aircraft here.

== Post aircraft phase – Rearsby Automotive Limited ==
Post-war, the company began using its manufacturing skills to supply the re-emerging UK motor industry. Auster Commercial, as this arm of the business was known, changed its name to Rearsby Automotive Ltd in 1966. Auster was now part of Pressed Steel Company which in turn was a division of the British Motor Corporation. In 1968, Auster Aircraft/Rearsby Automotive became part of British Leyland. Aircraft manufacture ceased in 1969.

Rearsby Automotive expanded its sales quickly in order to occupy the whole site, before British Leyland sold off the former aircraft factory and airfield. The automotive business, under the name, Rearsby Components, won business with Ford, Chrysler UK and G.M., British Leyland's competitors. The business became highly profitable. Meanwhile, its parent company went from strife and crisis to crisis throughout the 1970s.

In 1981, British Leyland, as part of its consolidation process, announced to the Rearsby management, the plant was to close. The management team, led by Ivor Vaughan, believed in the future of the business and organised/created the first British Leyland management buy-out (MBO) in 1982, indeed one of the very early UK MBOs. Rearsby Automotive Ltd was resurrected. The business continued to expand winning business with Nissan, Honda, Toyota and VW, designing and developing all the products it supplied for its customer vehicles. This included supplying components in high volume to vehicle plants in Japan. The company also adopted lean manufacturing philosophies. Sales had grown to £29m in 1996. The original MBO team sold the business in 1996 to Adwest group but the business failed in 2003.

The site, now Rearsby Business Park, is still owned by the original MBO team. Following the failure of Adwest to nurture and grow the business and the closure in 2003, the MBO team spent over £2m renovating and improving the buildings and site with the principal aim of re-establishing employment back to Gaddesby Lane. As of 2017, some 200 are employed on site.

For further reading/information on Rearsby Automotive Ltd see:

www.rearsbyautomotive.co.uk

== Gallery ==
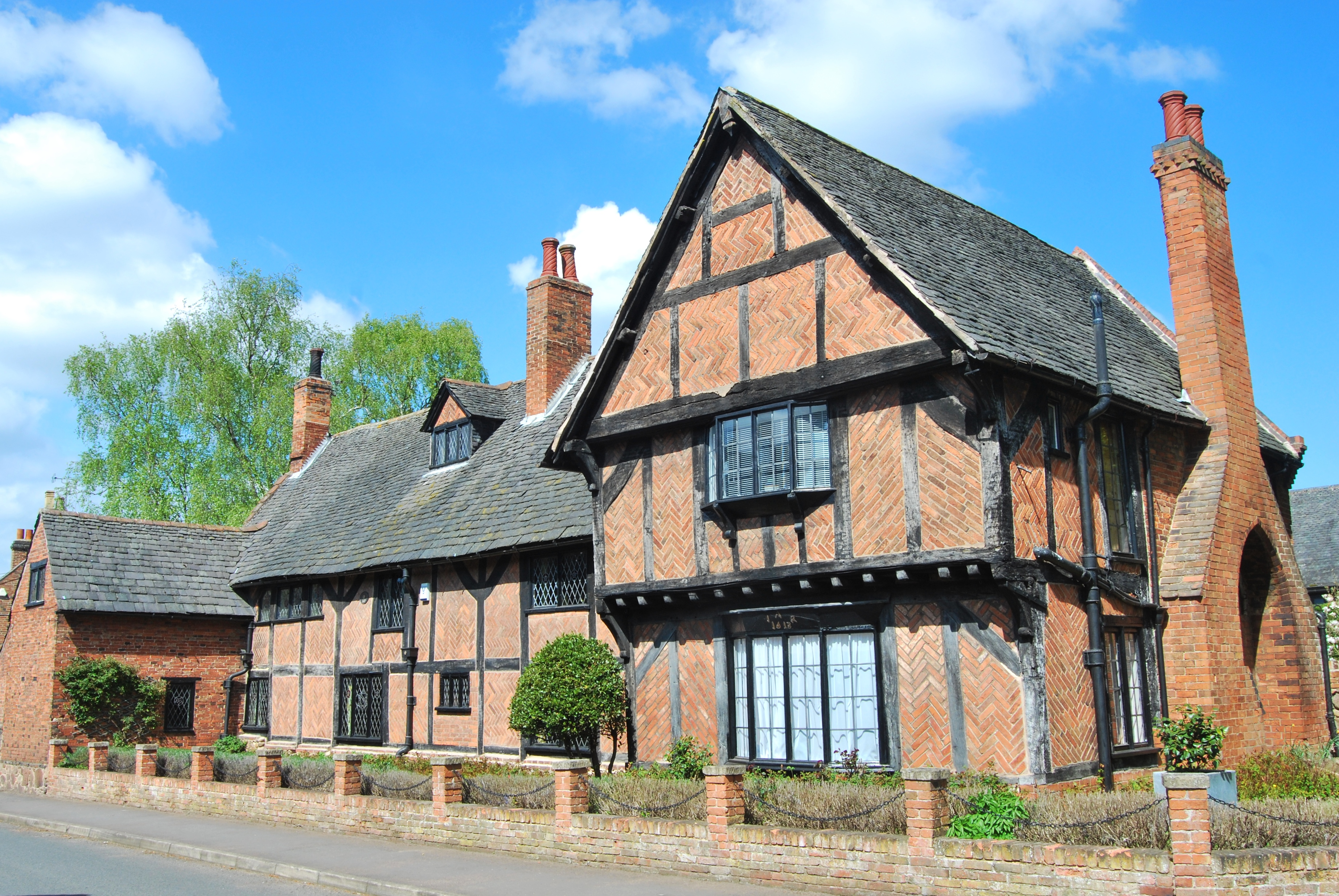
Rearsby, the Olde House

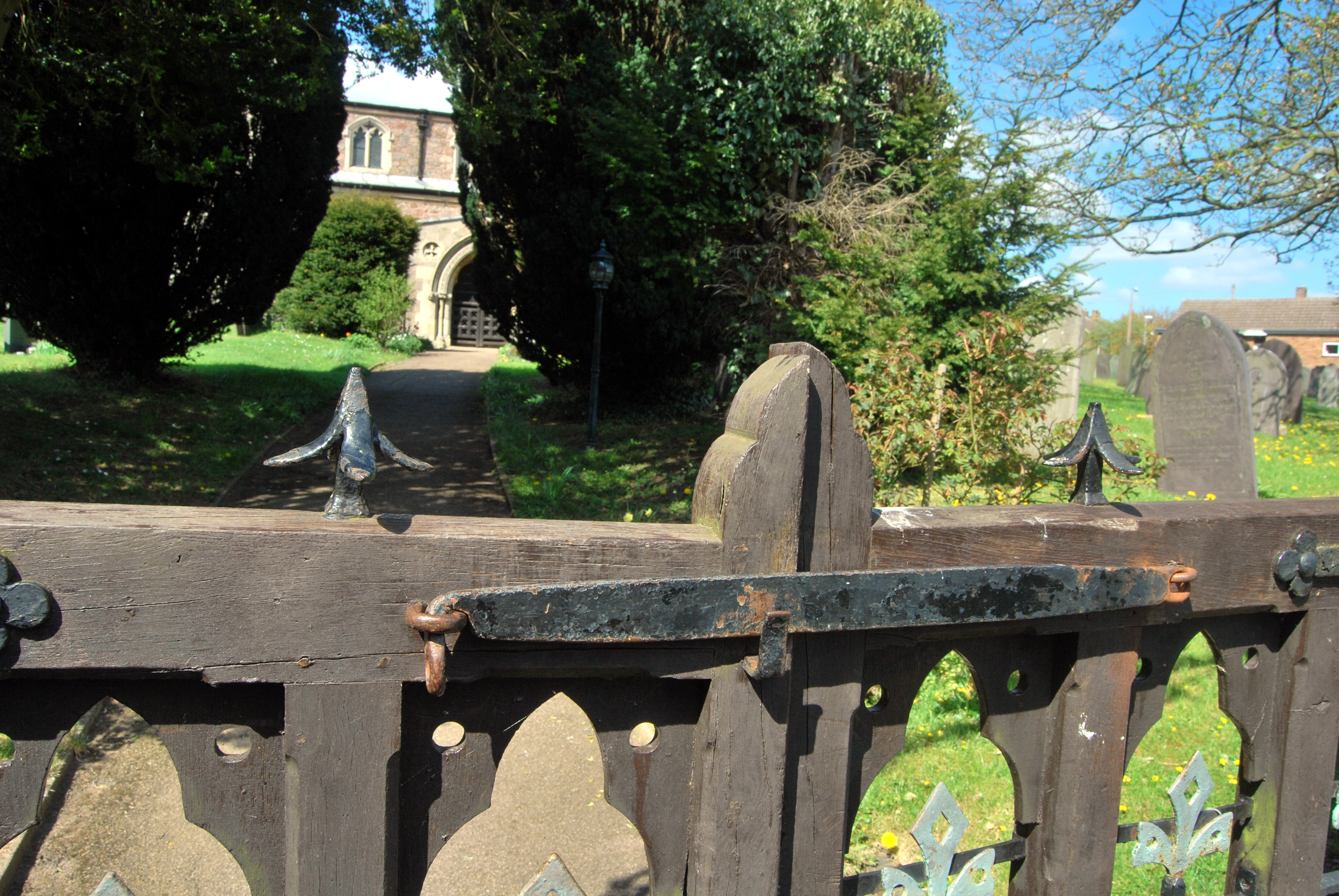
Old latch on Rearsby churchyard

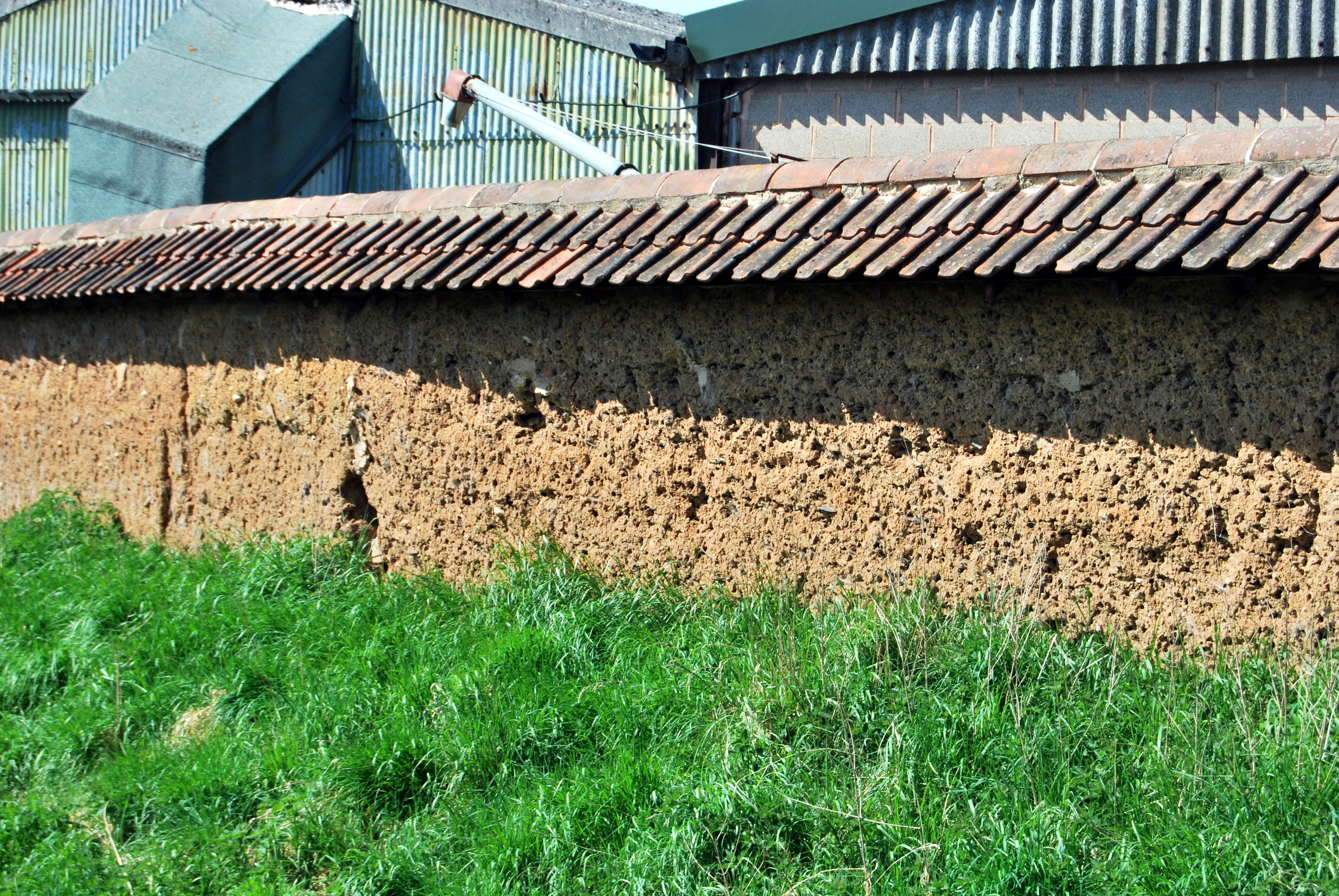
An old mud wall at Rearsby that is a habitat for solitary bees.

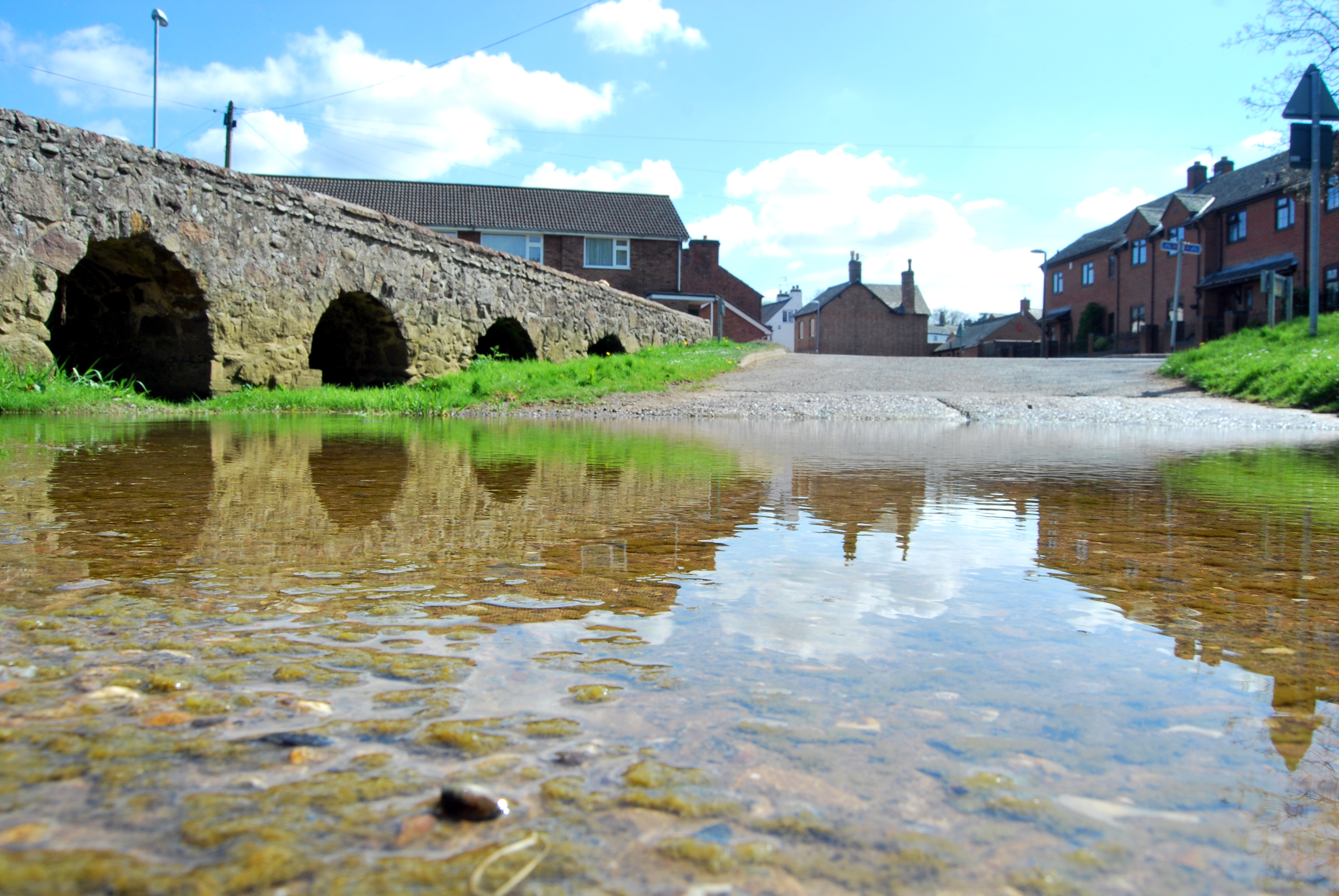
A ford and ancient bridge at Rearsby.

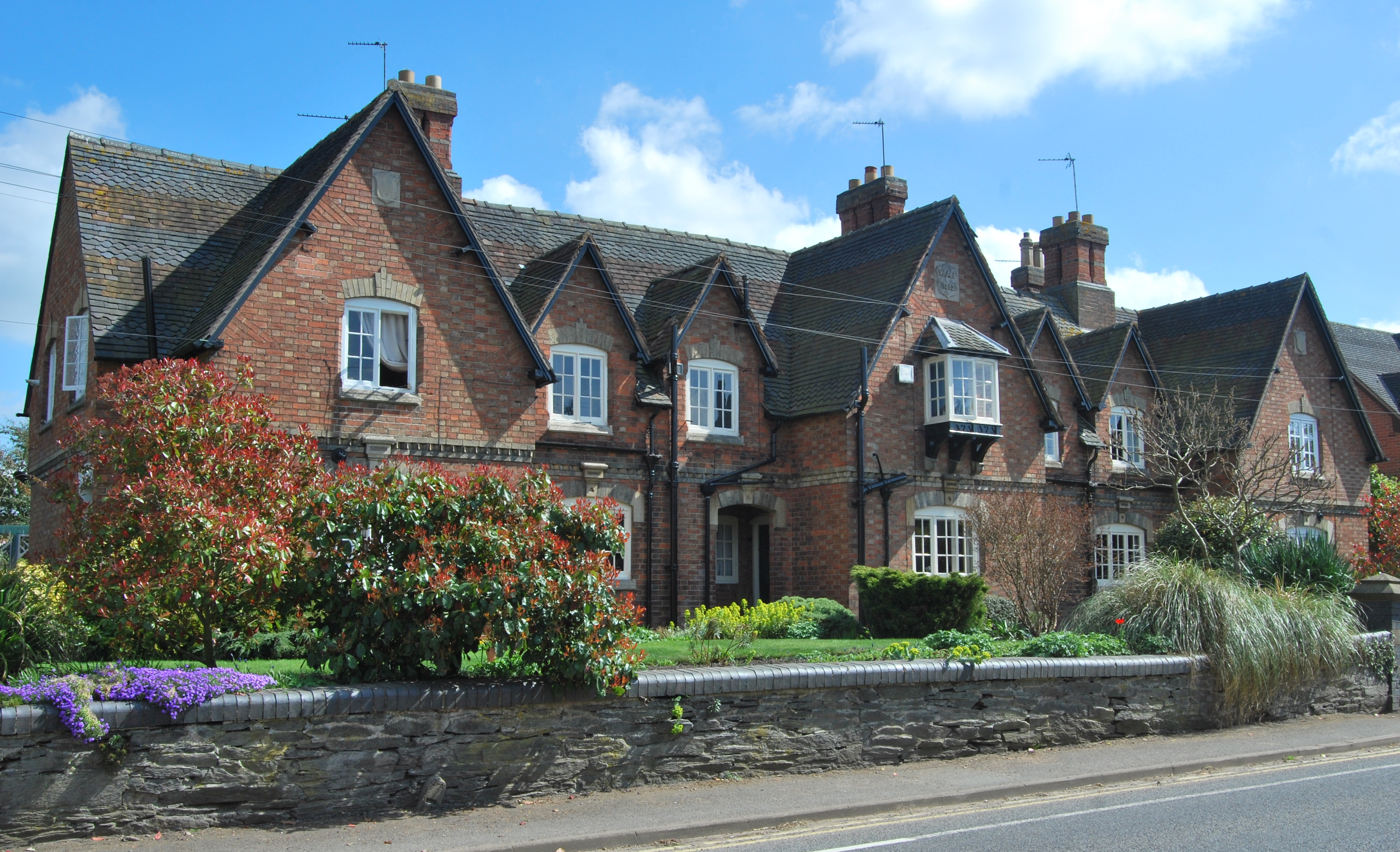
The Pochin Almeshouses at Rearsby

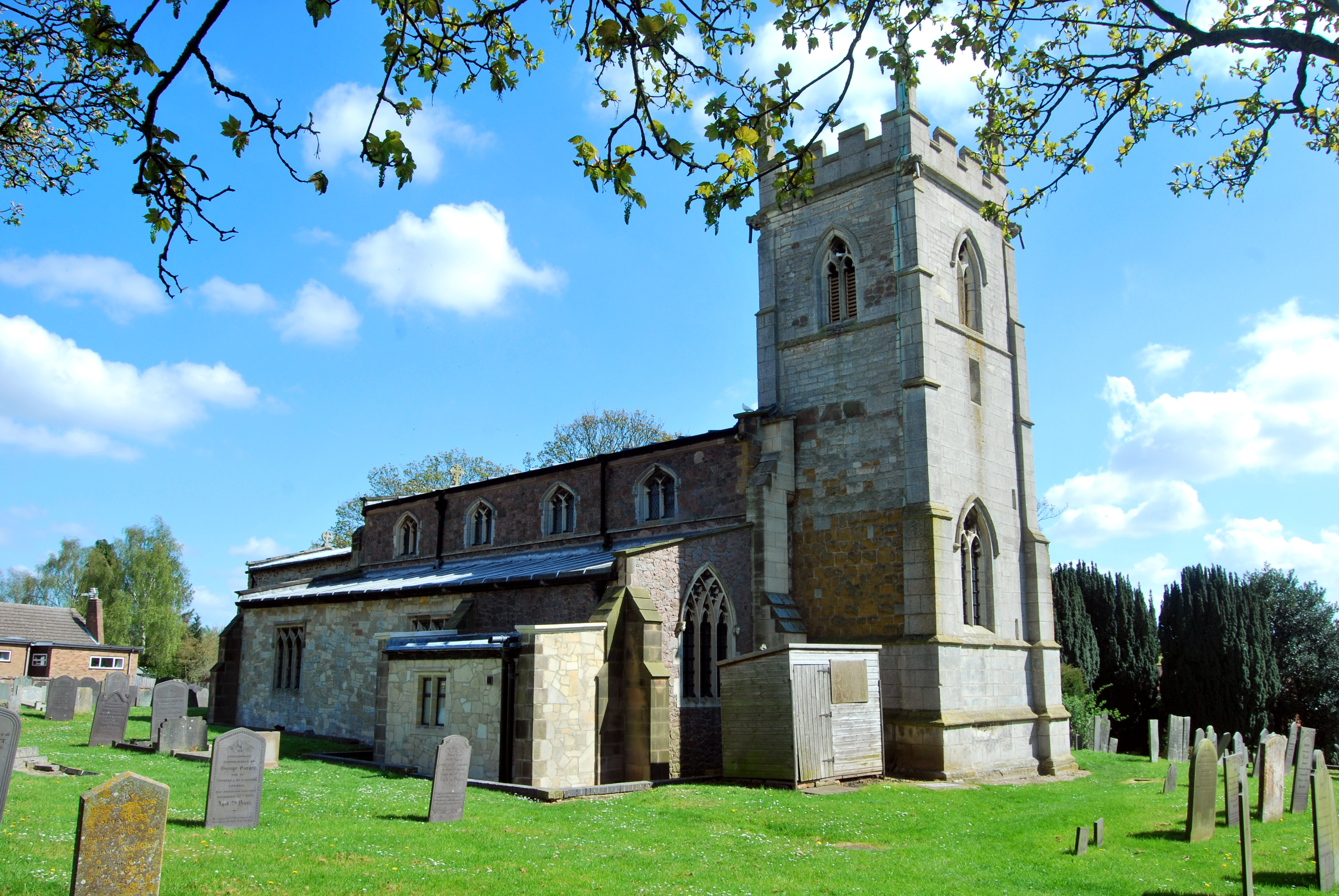
Rearsby St Michael and All Saints NW aspect

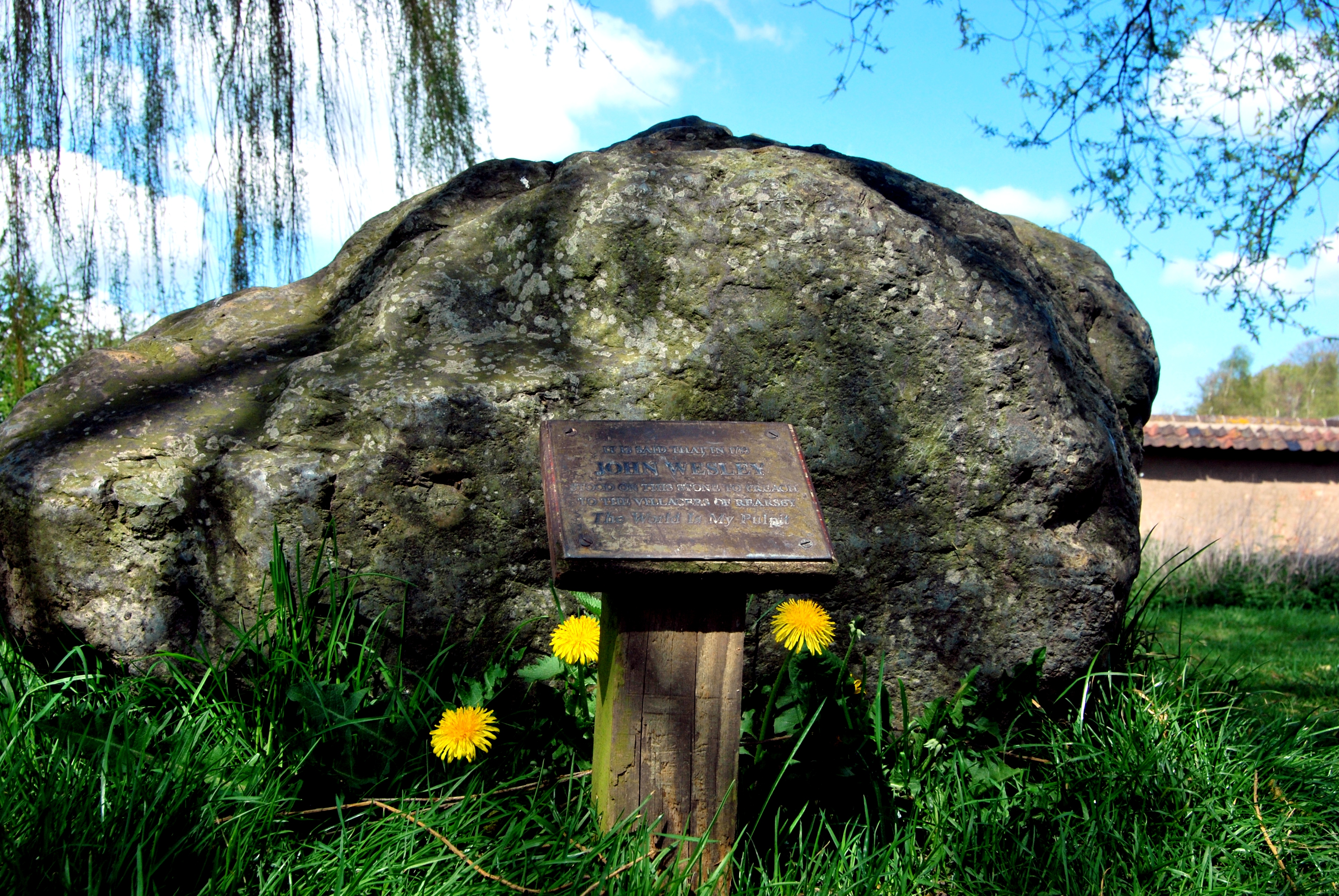
Rearsby Wesley preaching stone. Apparently Wesly preached a sermon here

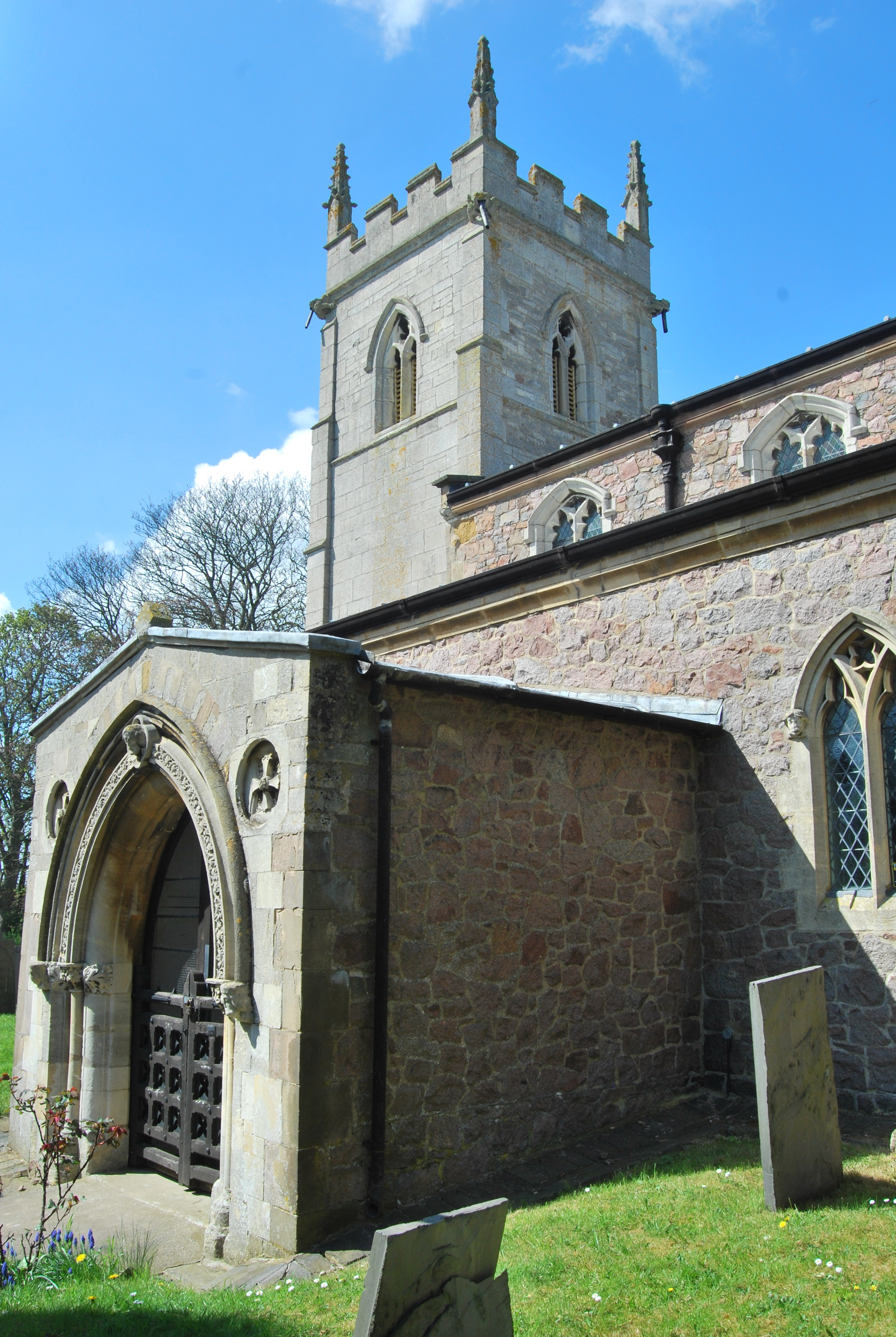
Rearsby St Michael and All Saints South Porch

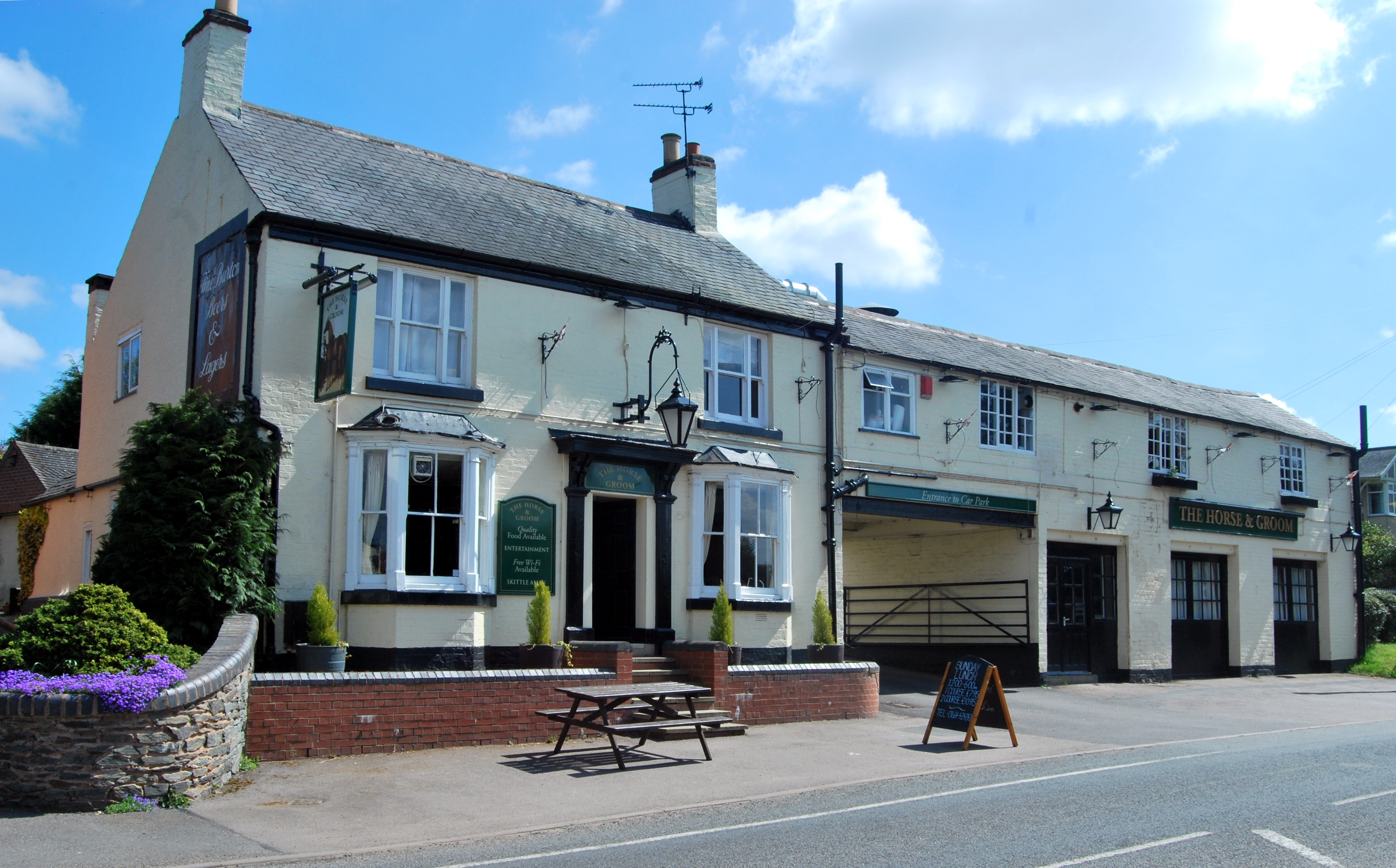
Rearsby The Horse and Groom pub.
