= Avia BH-4 =

Prototype fighter aircraft built in Czechoslovakia

BH-4
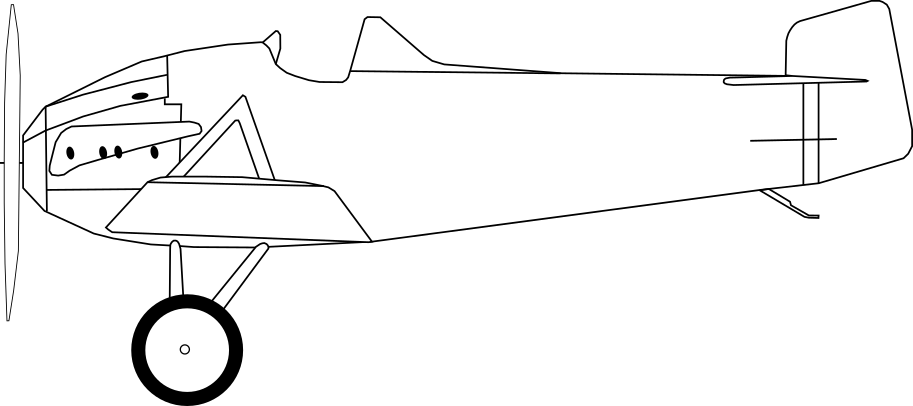

General information
- Type: Fighter
- Manufacturer: Avia
- Designer: Pavel Beneš and Miroslav Hajn
- Number built: 1

History
- First flight: 1922

The Avia BH-4 was a prototype fighter aircraft built in Czechoslovakia in 1922. It was a development of the BH-3 fitted with a Hispano-Suiza 8 engine in an attempt to improve the aircraft's performance. To accommodate the new powerplant, the forward fuselage was considerably redesigned, and the structure in general and undercarriage in particular were strengthened. Performance was found to be only marginally better than the BH-3, and development was quickly abandoned.

== Specifications ==
General characteristics

- Crew: one pilot
- Length: 6.47 m (21 ft 3 in)
- Wingspan: 10.25 m (33 ft 7 in)
- Height: 2.97 m (9 ft 9 in)
- Wing area: 15.8 m^{2} (170 sq ft)
- Empty weight: 724 kg (1,596 lb)
- Gross weight: 1,015 kg (2,238 lb)
- Powerplant: 1 × Hispano-Suiza 8Ba Vee-8 , 164 kW (220 hp)

Performance

- Maximum speed: 222 km/h (138 mph, 120 kn)
- Range: 510 km (320 mi, 280 nmi)
- Service ceiling: 6,700 m (22,000 ft)
- Rate of climb: 4.2 m/s (820 ft/min)

Armament

- 2 × fixed, forward-firing machine guns

== See also ==
Related development

- BH-3
