= Avia BH-19 =

BH-19
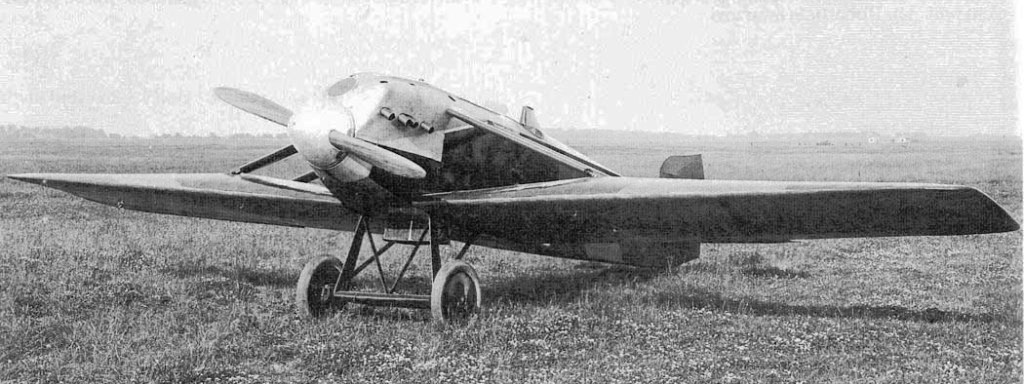

General information
- Type: Fighter
- Manufacturer: Avia
- Designer: Pavel Beneš and Miroslav Hajn
- Number built: 2

History
- First flight: 1924

The Avia BH-19 was a fighter aircraft built in Czechoslovakia in 1924. It was a low-wing braced monoplane derived from the Avia BH-3 and reflected its designers' ongoing belief that the monoplane configuration was the most suitable for a fighter aircraft. Initial trials revealed excellent performance, but also displayed control problems and aileron flutter. Nevertheless, the Czechoslovak Army was sufficiently impressed to inform Avia that it would order the BH-19 if the problems could be rectified. The first prototype was destroyed in a crash during speed trials, and the second prototype revealed no better handling than its predecessor. At this point, the Czechoslovak War Ministry stepped in and asked Avia to cease its attempts to develop a monoplane fighter.

== Specifications ==
General characteristics

- Crew: one pilot
- Length: 7.37 m (24 ft 2 in)
- Wingspan: 10.80 m (35 ft 5 in)
- Wing area: 18.3 m^{2} (197 sq ft)
- Empty weight: 792 kg (1,746 lb)
- Gross weight: 1,155 kg (2,546 lb)
- Powerplant: 1 × Skoda-built Hispano-Suiza 8Fb Vee-8 , 230 kW (310 hp)

Performance

- Maximum speed: 245 km/h (152 mph, 132 kn)
- Range: 520 km (320 mi, 280 nmi)
- Service ceiling: 8,000 m (26,200 ft)
- Rate of climb: 5.6 m/s (1,090 ft/min)

Armament

- 2 × fixed, forward-firing .303 Vickers machine guns

== See also ==
Related development

- BH-3
