= Avia BH-17 =

Czechoslovak fighter aircraft

BH-17
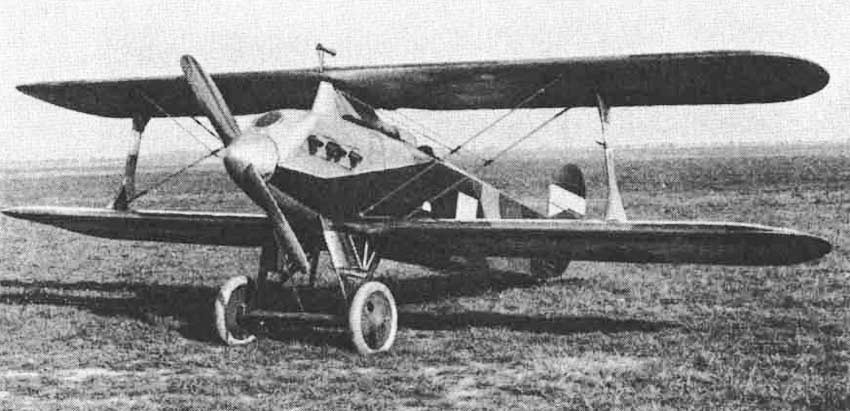

General information
- Type: Fighter
- Manufacturer: Avia
- Designer: Pavel Beneš and Miroslav Hajn
- Primary user: Czechoslovak Air Force
- Number built: 24

History
- First flight: 1924

The Avia BH-17 was a biplane fighter aircraft built in Czechoslovakia in 1924. It was a development of the BH-6 and BH-8, and work on the latter aircraft was cut short in favour of this one. Operational trials in 1924 revealed performance good enough for the Czechoslovak Air Force to place an order for 24 examples. In actual service, however, the BH-17 proved unreliable and was soon withdrawn.

== Specifications ==
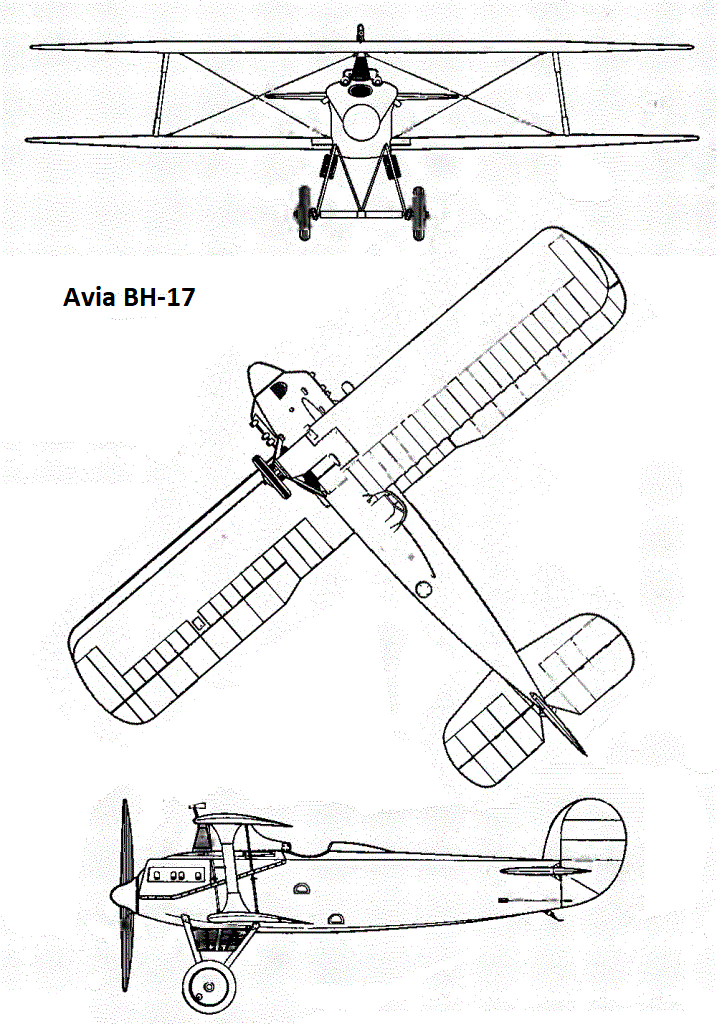
Avia BH-17 3-view drawing

General characteristics

- Crew: one pilot
- Length: 6.86 m (22 ft 6 in)
- Wingspan: 8.86 m (30 ft 0 in)
- Wing area: 21.3 m^{2} (229 sq ft)
- Empty weight: 762 kg (1,680 lb)
- Gross weight: 1,155 kg (2,546 lb)
- Powerplant: 1 × Skoda-built Hispano-Suiza 8Fb Vee-8 , 230 kW (310 hp)

Performance

- Maximum speed: 235 km/h (146 mph, 127 kn)
- Range: 500 km (310 mi, 270 nmi)
- Service ceiling: 8,000 m (26,000 ft)
- Rate of climb: 5.9 m/s (1,170 ft/min)

Armament

- 2 × fixed, forward-firing .303 Vickers machine guns

== See also ==
Related development

- BH-6
- BH-8
