= Avia BH-6 =

Prototype Czechoslovak fighter aircraft

BH-6
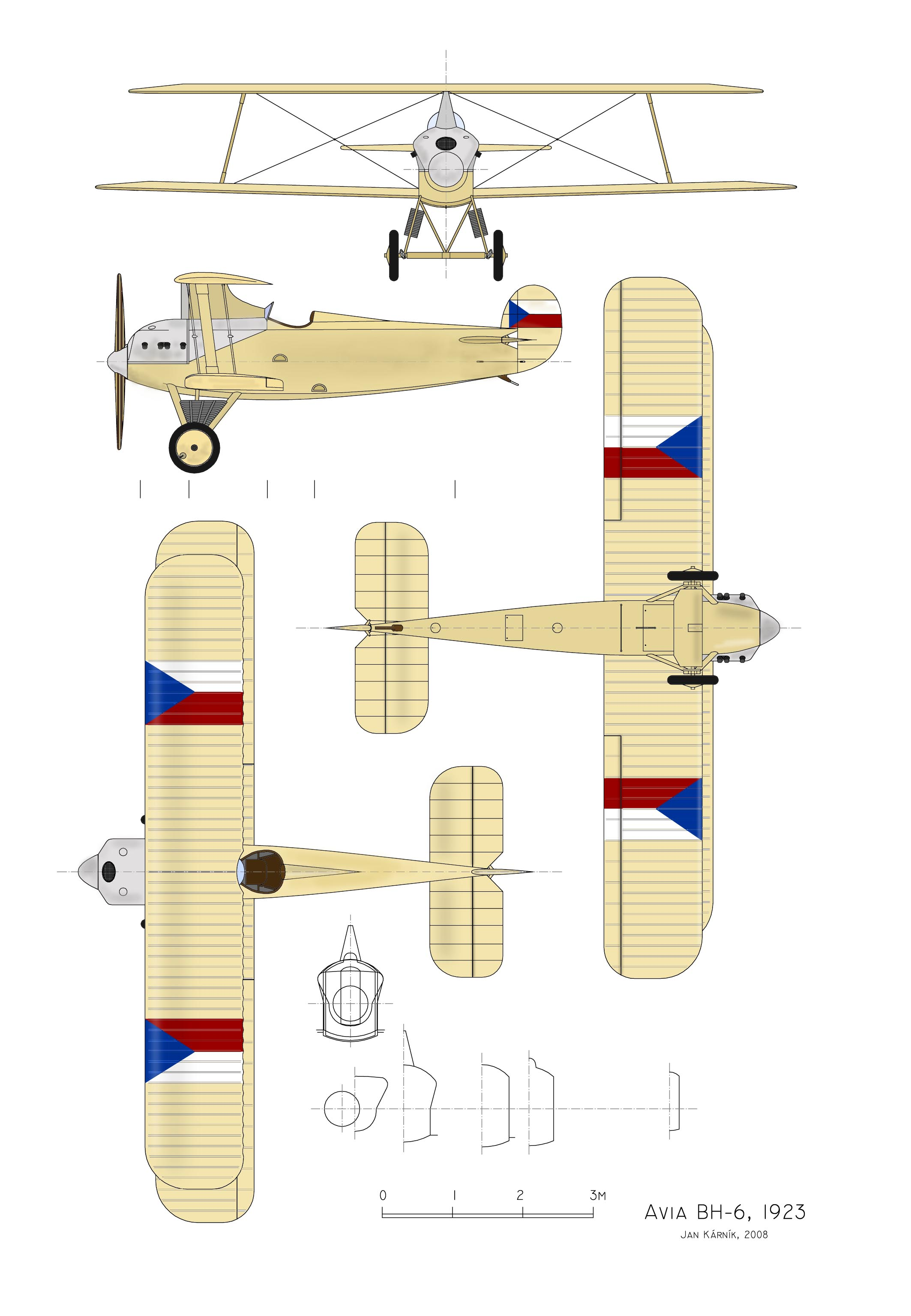

General information
- Type: Fighter
- Manufacturer: Avia
- Designer: Pavel Beneš and Miroslav Hajn
- Number built: 1

History
- First flight: 1923

The Avia BH-6 was a prototype fighter aircraft built in Czechoslovakia in 1923. It was a single-bay biplane of unusual configuration, developed in tandem with the BH-7, which shared its fuselage and tail design.

== Development ==
The BH-6 had wings of unequal span, but unusually, the top wing was the shorter of the two, and while it was braced to the bottom wing with a single I-strut on either side, these sloped inwards from bottom to top. Finally, the top wing was attached to the fuselage not by a set of cabane struts, but by a single large pylon.

The BH-6 crashed early in its test programme, and when the related BH-7 did also, both implementations of this design were abandoned.

== Specifications ==
General characteristics

- Crew: one pilot
- Length: 6.47 m (21 ft 3 in)
- Wingspan: 9.98 m (32 ft 9 in)
- Height: 2.88 m (9 ft 5 in)
- Wing area: 22.6 m^{2} (243 sq ft)
- Empty weight: 878 kg (1,936 lb)
- Gross weight: 1,180 kg (2,601 lb)
- Powerplant: 1 × Skoda licence-built Hispano-Suiza 8Fb , 224 kW (300 hp)

Performance

- Maximum speed: 220 km/h (137 mph, 119 kn)
- Endurance: 2 hours
- Service ceiling: 7,000 m (23,000 ft)

Armament

- 2 × fixed, forward-firing .303 Vickers machine guns

== See also ==
Related development

- BH-7
- BH-8
- BH-17
