= Avia BH-26 =

BH-26
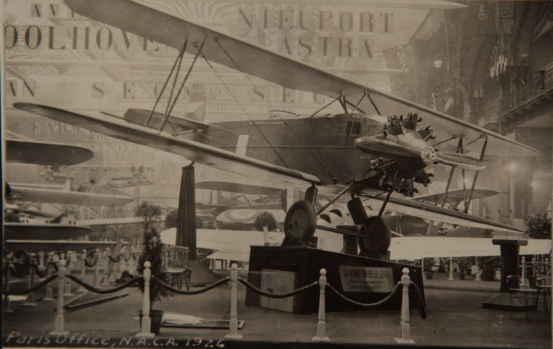

General information
- Type: Reconnaissance aircraft
- Manufacturer: Avia
- Designer: Pavel Beneš and Miroslav Hajn
- Number built: ca. 8

History
- First flight: 1927

The Avia BH-26 was a two-seat armed reconnaissance aircraft built in Czechoslovakia in 1927. It was a single-bay unstaggered biplane with equal-span wings and a fixed tailskid undercarriage. Both upper and lower wings featured long-span ailerons, which were dynamically balanced by a small auxiliary airfoil mounted to the upper surface of the lower ailerons. Its design was typical of this type of aircraft built during World War I and the years following; pilot and observer sat in tandem open cockpits with the observer armed with a machine gun on a ring mount. As with many other Avia designs, the BH-26 originally had no fixed fin, only a rudder, but this was changed in service.

== Specifications ==
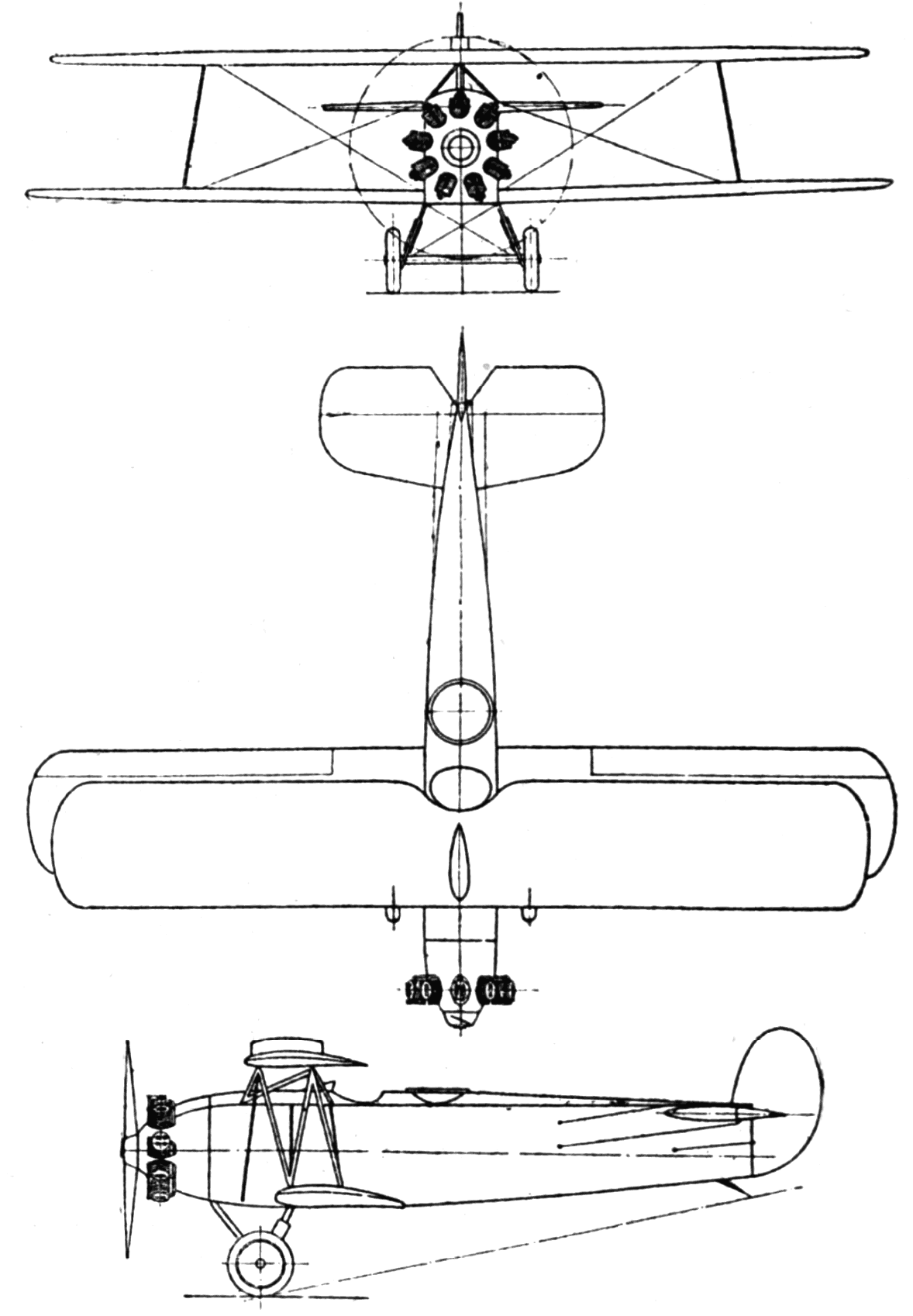
Avia BH-26 3-view drawing from L'Aéronautique January,1927

Data from Jane's all the World's Aircraft 1928

General characteristics

- Crew: 2 - pilot and observer
- Length: 8.93 m (29 ft 4 in)
- Wingspan: 10.8 m (35 ft 5 in)
- Height: 3.35 m (11 ft 0 in)
- Wing area: 31 m^{2} (330 sq ft)
- Empty weight: 1,080 kg (2,381 lb)
- Gross weight: 1,760 kg (3,880 lb)
- Fuel capacity: 380 kg (840 lb) fuel and oil
- Powerplant: 1 × Walter-built Bristol Jupiter 9-cylinder air-cooled radial piston engine, 340 kW (450 hp)
- Propellers: 2-bladed fixed-pitch propeller

Performance

- Maximum speed: 250 km/h (160 mph, 130 kn)
- Stall speed: 90 km/h (56 mph, 49 kn)
- Range: 530 km (330 mi, 290 nmi)
- Service ceiling: 7,500 m (24,600 ft)
- Rate of climb: 6.3 m/s (1,240 ft/min)
- Time to altitude: 5,000 m (16,000 ft) in 13 minutes 20 seconds; 6,000 m (20,000 ft) in 17 minutes 30 seconds; 7,000 m (23,000 ft) in 27 minutes
- Wing loading: 55.6 kg/m^{2} (11.4 lb/sq ft)
- Power/mass: 0.205 kW/kg (0.125 hp/lb)

Armament

- Guns: 2x fixed, forward-firing, synchronised 7.7 mm (0.303 in) Vickers machine-guns in the forward fuselage upper decking and 2x 7.7 mm (0.303 in) Lewis guns on a flexible mount in the rear cockpit.

== See also ==
Related development BH-28
