= Avia BH-2 =

BH-2

General information
- Type: Sportsplane
- Manufacturer: Avia
- Designer: Pavel Beneš and Miroslav Hajn
- Number built: 1

The Avia BH-2 was a single-seat sports plane built in Czechoslovakia in 1921. Originally intended to be powered by an Indian motorcycle engine, this was found to be unsuitable and a Bristol Cherub was fitted instead. It is uncertain today whether the aircraft ever actually flew in either configuration.

== Specifications ==
General characteristics

- Crew: one pilot
- Length: 5.34 m (17 ft 6 in)
- Wingspan: 7.00 m (23 ft 0 in)
- Empty weight: 100 kg (220 lb)
- Powerplant: 1 × Indian motorcycle engine , 13 kW (18 hp)
