= Avia BH-20 =

BH-20

General information
- Type: Civil trainer
- Manufacturer: Avia
- Designer: Pavel Beneš and Miroslav Hajn
- Number built: 1

History
- First flight: 1924

The Avia BH-20 was a civil trainer aircraft built in Czechoslovakia in 1924. It was a single-bay, unstaggered biplane of conventional configuration. The wings were braced with N-struts at around half-span. The pilot and instructor were seated in tandem, open cockpits.

== Specifications ==
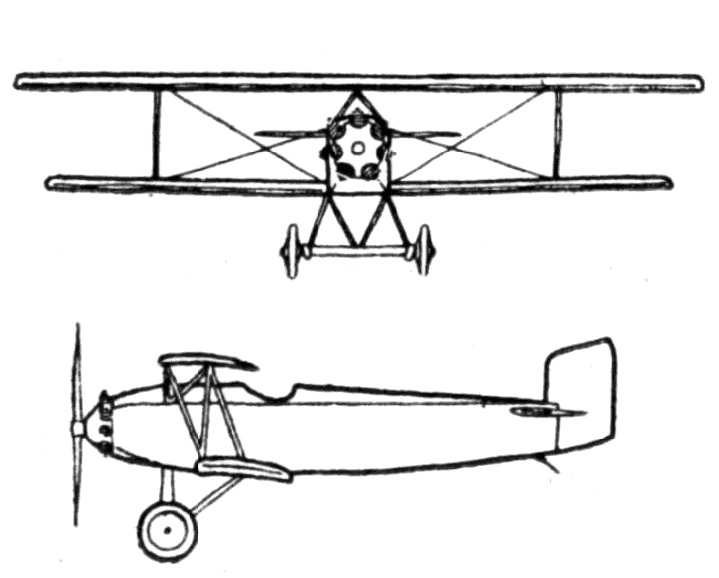
Avia BH-20 2-view drawing from L'Aéronautique July,1927

General characteristics

- Crew: two, pilot and instructor
- Length: 6.29 m (20 ft 8 in)
- Wingspan: 7.88 m (25 ft 10 in)
- Wing area: 16.1 m^{2} (173 sq ft)
- Empty weight: 345 kg (761 lb)
- Gross weight: 485 kg (1,069 lb)
- Powerplant: 1 × Walter NZ 60 radial , 45 kW (60 hp)

Performance

- Maximum speed: 160 km/h (100 mph, 87 kn)
- Service ceiling: 4,000 m (13,100 ft)
- Rate of climb: 3.1 m/s (610 ft/min)
