= Avia BH-8 =

Prototype Czechoslovak fighter aircraft

BH-8
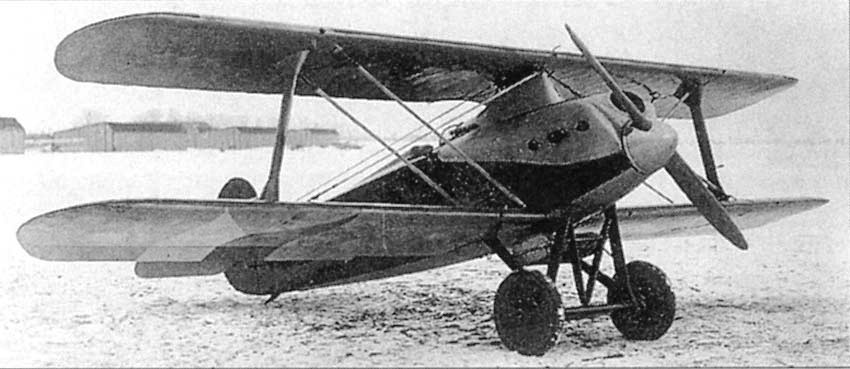

General information
- Type: Fighter
- Manufacturer: Avia
- Designer: Pavel Beneš and Miroslav Hajn
- Number built: 1

History
- First flight: 1923

The Avia BH-8 was a prototype fighter aircraft built in Czechoslovakia in 1923. It was an unequal-span biplane developed on the basis of the ill-fated BH-6 design, in an attempt to address that type's problems. It shared the BH-6's unusual wing cellule design.

When test-flown in late 1923, it did indeed display better flying characteristics than its predecessor, but was overtaken in development by another variation of the same design, the BH-17.

== Specifications ==
General characteristics

- Crew: one pilot
- Length: 6.49 m (21 ft 3 in)
- Wingspan: 9.48 m (31 ft 1 in)
- Height: 2.77 m (9 ft 1 in)
- Wing area: 22.1 m^{2} (238 sq ft)
- Empty weight: 843 kg (1,858 lb)
- Gross weight: 1,143 kg (2,520 lb)
- Powerplant: 1 × Skoda licence-built Hispano-Suiza 8Fb Vee-8 , 310 kW (231 hp)

Performance

- Maximum speed: 222 km/h (138 mph, 120 kn)
- Range: 450 km (280 mi, 240 nmi)
- Service ceiling: 8,000 m (26,200 ft)
- Rate of climb: 5.7 m/s (1,115 ft/min)

Armament

- 2 × fixed, forward-firing .303 Vickers machine guns

== See also ==
Related development

- BH-6
- BH-17
