= Avia BH-28 =

Military reconnaissance biplane aircraft

BH-28
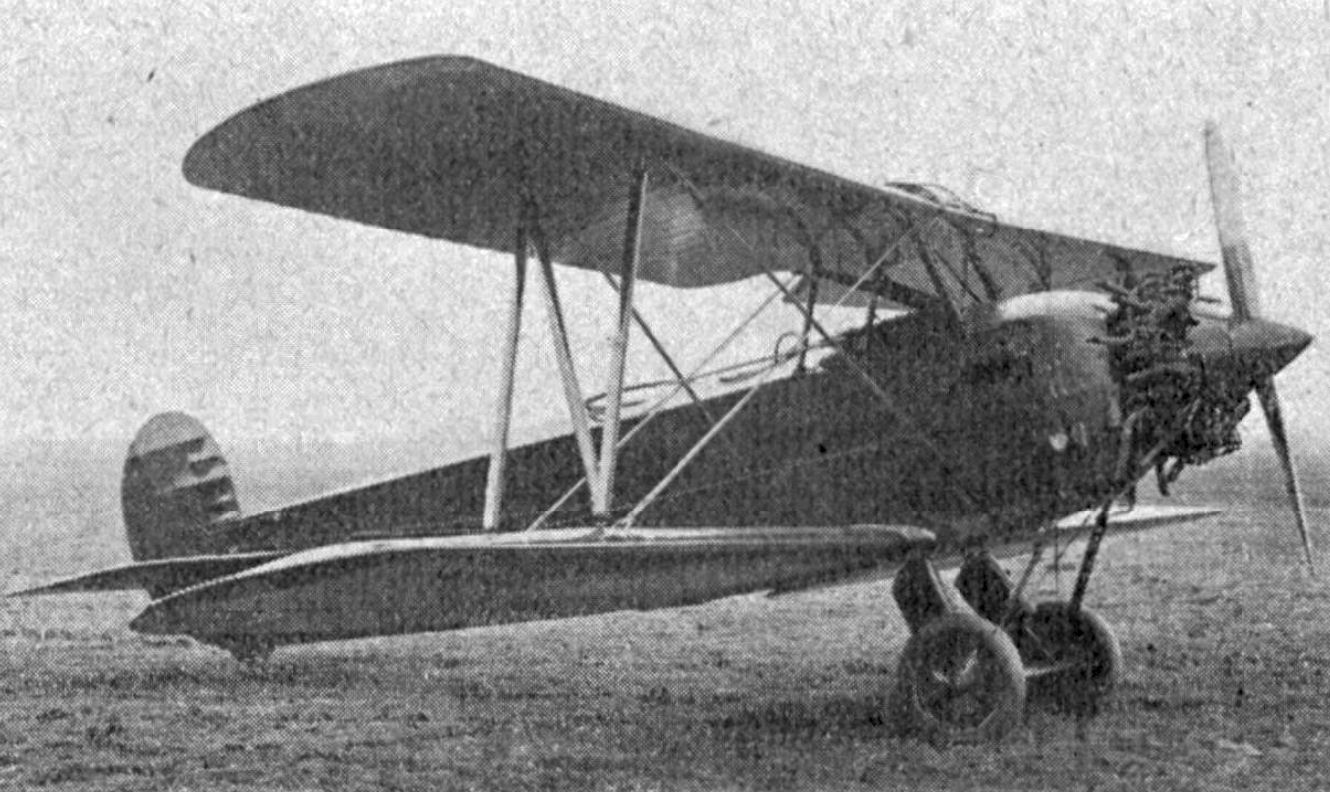

General information
- Type: Reconnaissance aircraft
- Manufacturer: Avia
- Designer: Pavel Beneš and Miroslav Hajn
- Number built: 1

History
- First flight: 1927

The Avia BH-28 was a military reconnaissance biplane aircraft developed in Czechoslovakia in 1927 to meet a requirement for such an aircraft by the government of Romania. Avia based the design on their BH-26, but replaced the engine with an Armstrong Siddeley Jaguar, as specified in the requirement. The completed aircraft was taken to Bucharest for demonstration, but no order ensued, and this prototype was the only example constructed.

== Specifications ==
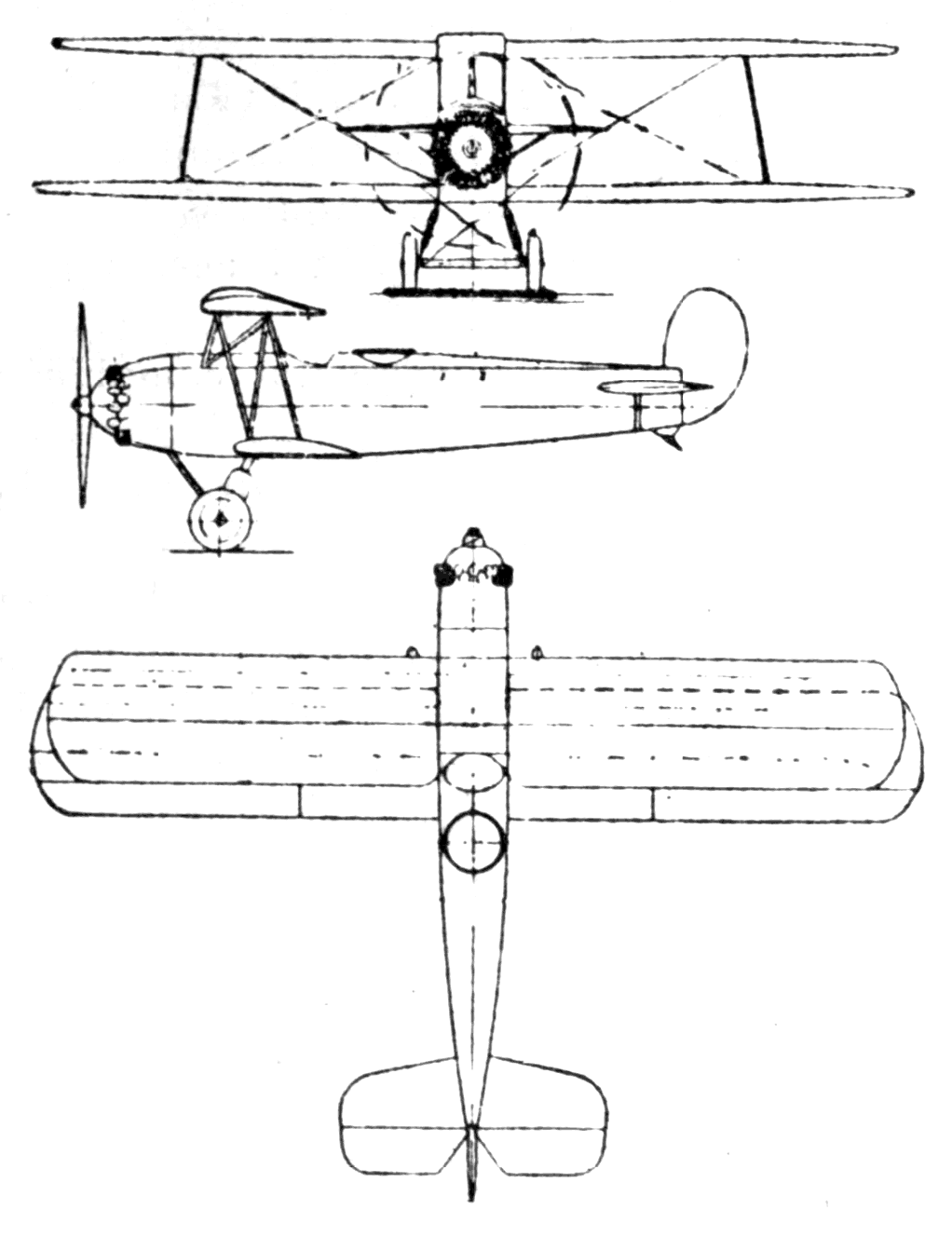
Avia BH-28 3-view drawing from Le Document aéronautique August,1927

General characteristics

- Crew: two, pilot and observer
- Length: 9.05 m (29 ft 8 in)
- Wingspan: 11.80 m (38 ft 8 in)
- Wing area: 36.5 m^{2} (393 sq ft)
- Empty weight: 1,150 kg (2,535 lb)
- Gross weight: 1,950 kg (4,299 lb)
- Powerplant: 1 × Armstrong Siddeley Jaguar radial , 287 kW (385 hp)

Performance

- Maximum speed: 230 km/h (143 mph, 124 kn)
- Range: 900 km (559 mi, 486 nmi)
- Service ceiling: 7,200 m (23,622 ft)
- Rate of climb: 3.3 m/s (660 ft/min)

Armament

- 2 × fixed, forward-firing 7.7 mm (0.303 in) machine guns
- 1 × flexible 7.7 mm (0.303 in) machine gun for the observer

== See also ==
Related development

- BH-26
