= Avia BH-25 =

BH-25
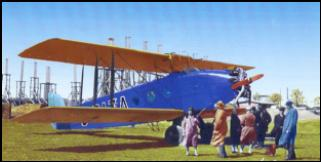
- BH-25J

General information
- Type: Airliner
- Manufacturer: Avia
- Designer: Pavel Beneš and Miroslav Hajn
- Primary users: Czechoslovak Airlines SNNA
- Number built: 12

History
- First flight: 1926
- Retired: 1936

The Avia BH-25 was a biplane airliner built in Czechoslovakia in 1926.

Typical of airliners of its time, it seated five passengers within its fuselage, whilst the pilots sat in an open cockpit above. Of conventional configuration, it was a single-bay bi-plane of equal span and unstaggered wings, with fixed tailskid landing gear. Originally designed for a Lorraine-Dietrich engine, this was changed to a Bristol Jupiter in service. After their withdrawal from airline use in 1936, some were used by the military for a while before finally becoming training targets.

== Variants ==
- BH-25L – with Lorraine Dietrich engine
- BH-25J – with Bristol Jupiter engine

== Operators ==
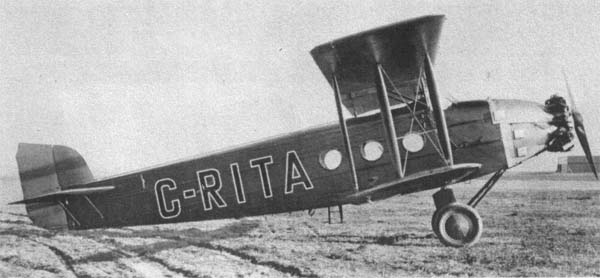
Avia BH-25 (C-RITA)

Czechoslovakia

- Czechoslovak Airlines – eight aircraft
- Československá letecká společnost (ČLS)

Romania

- Royal Romanian Air Force
- SNNA – four aircraft

== Specifications (BH-25J) ==
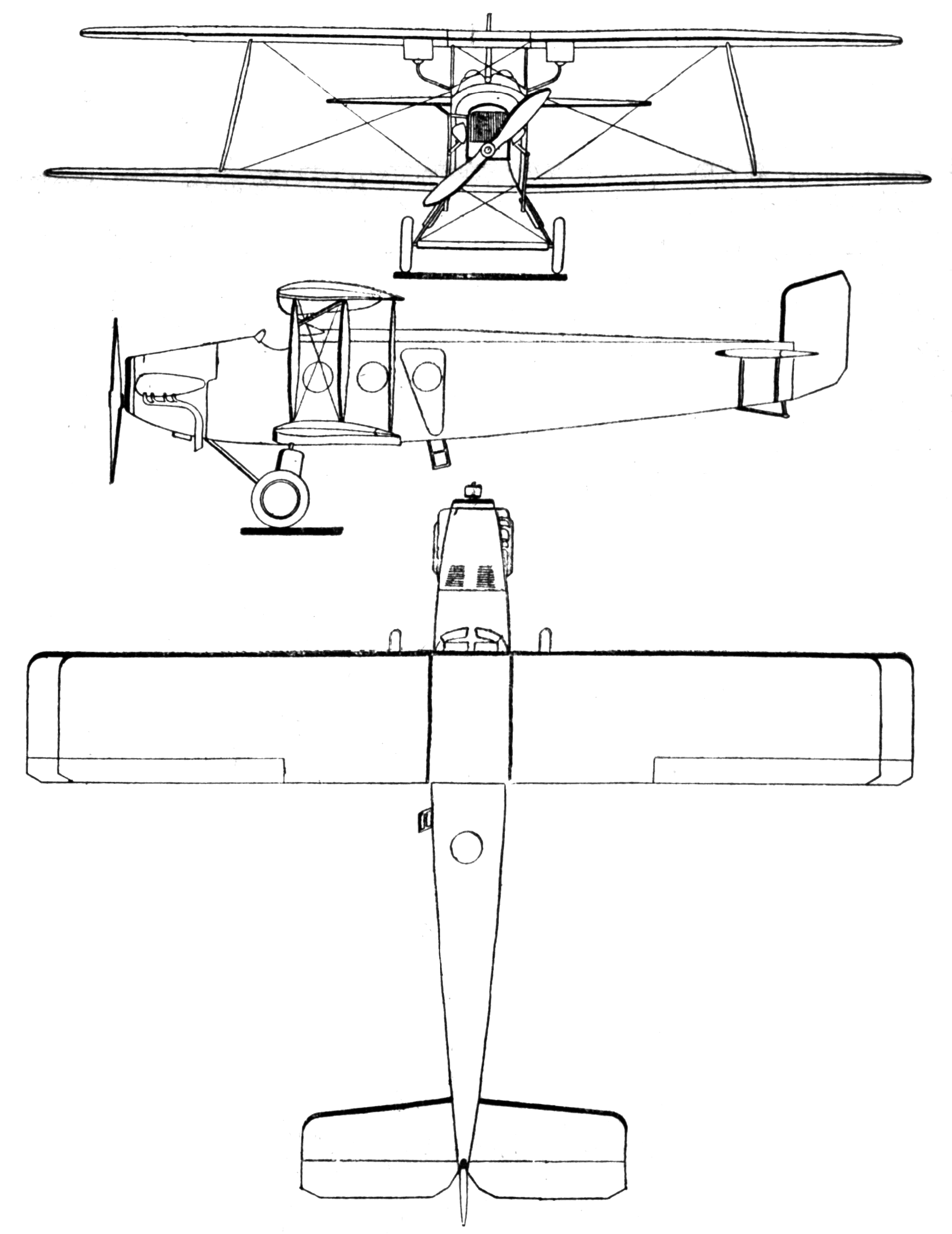
Avia BH-25L 3-view drawing from Les Ailes May 12, 1927

Data from Jane's all the World's Aircraft 1928

General characteristics

- Crew: 2
- Capacity: 5 pax / 500 kg (1,100 lb) payload
- Length: 12.82 m (42 ft 1 in)
- Wingspan: 15.3 m (50 ft 2 in)
- Height: 4.4 m (14 ft 5 in)
- Wing area: 62.5 m^{2} (673 sq ft)
- Empty weight: 1,820 kg (4,012 lb)
- Gross weight: 2,880 kg (6,349 lb)
- Fuel capacity: 400 kg (880 lb) fuel and oil
- Powerplant: 1 × Walter-built Bristol Jupiter 9-cylinder air-cooled radial piston engine, 340 kW (450 hp)
- Propellers: 2-bladed fixed-pitch propeller

Performance

- Maximum speed: 185 km/h (115 mph, 100 kn)
- Stall speed: 80 km/h (50 mph, 43 kn)
- Range: 700 km (430 mi, 380 nmi)
- Service ceiling: 4,100 m (13,500 ft)
- Rate of climb: 1.7 m/s (330 ft/min)
- Time to altitude: 2,000 m (6,600 ft) in 16 minutes; 3,000 m (9,800 ft) in 30 minutes
- Wing loading: 46 kg/m^{2} (9.4 lb/sq ft)
- Power/mass: 0.1095 kW/kg (0.0666 hp/lb)
