= Avia BH-16 =

BH-16
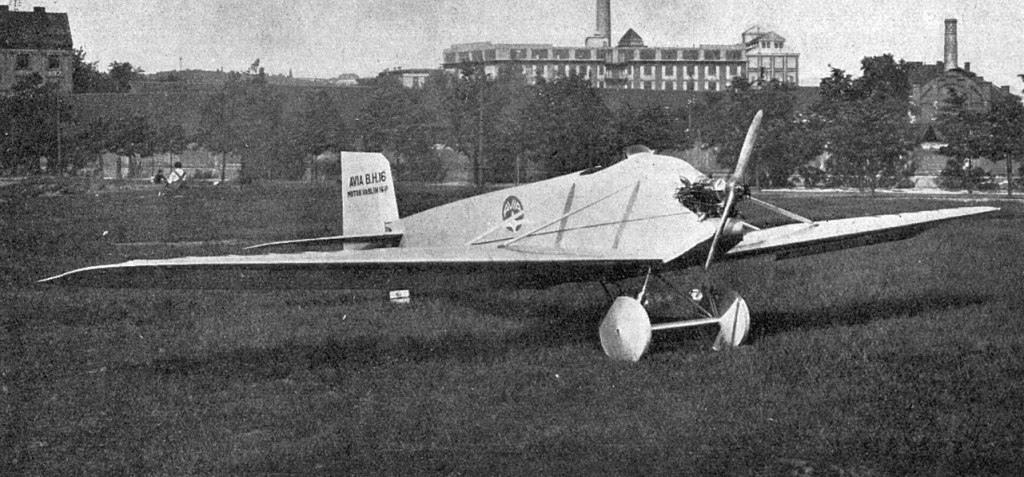

General information
- Type: Sports plane
- Manufacturer: Avia
- Designer: Pavel Beneš and Miroslav Hajn

History
- First flight: 1924

The Avia BH-16 was a single-seat very light sport aircraft built in Czechoslovakia in 1924. Like other early Avia designs, it was a low-wing braced monoplane of wooden construction. It could be powered by either a 12 kW (16 hp) four-cylinder Vaslin engine or a 19 kW (26 hp) inverted-V twin-Blackburne Tomtit.

== Specifications (Vaslin engine) ==
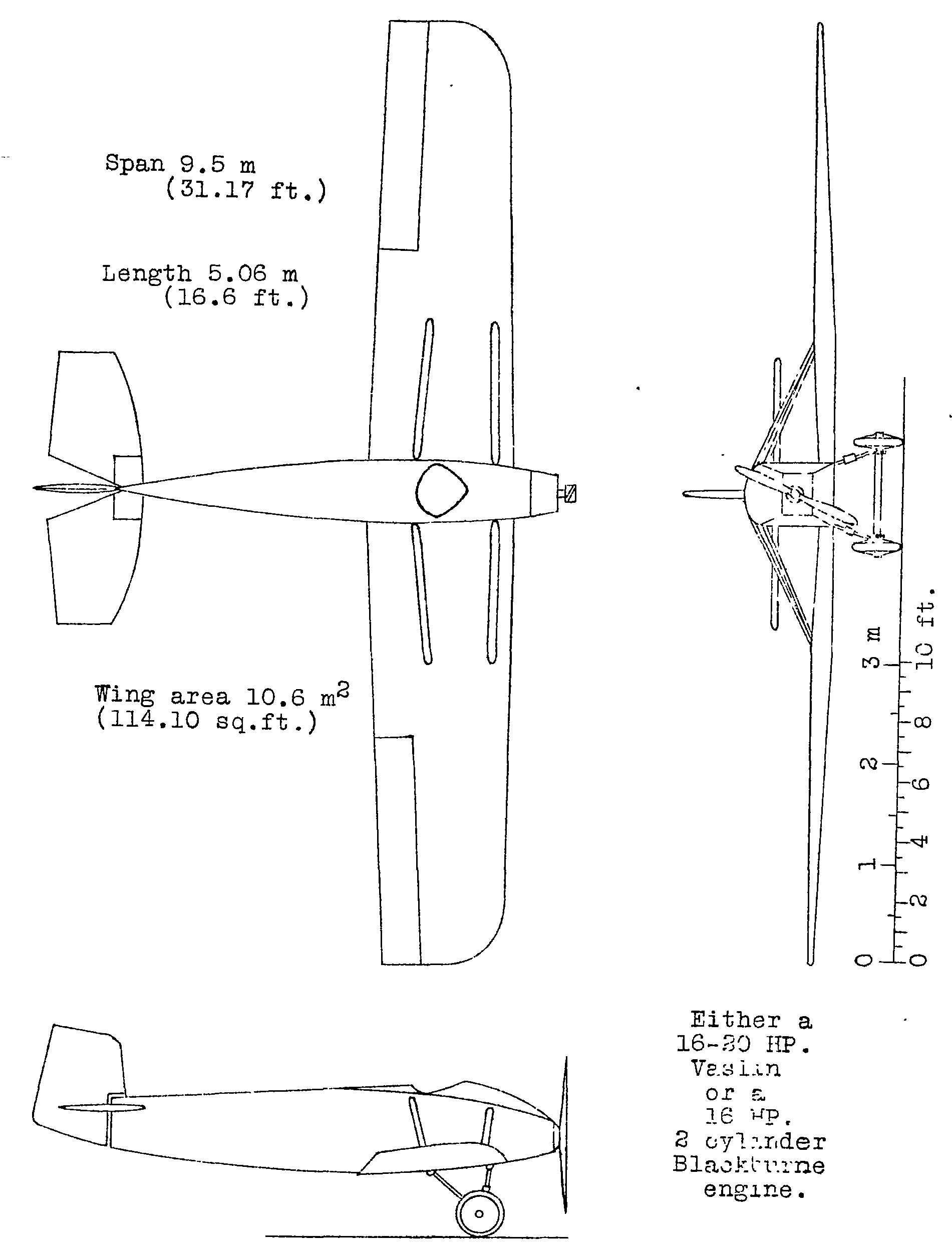
Avia BH-16 3-view drawing from NACA-TM-301

General characteristics

- Crew: one pilot
- Length: 5.13 m (16 ft 10 in)
- Wingspan: 9.50 m (31 ft 2 in)
- Wing area: 10.6 m^{2} (114 sq ft)
- Empty weight: 130 kg (287 lb)
- Gross weight: 238 kg (525 lb)
- Powerplant: 1 × 4-cylinder Vaslin , 12 kW (16 hp)

Performance

- Maximum speed: 116 km/h (72 mph, 63 kn)
- Range: 500 km (310 mi, 270 nmi)
- Service ceiling: 2,000 m (6,600 ft)
- Rate of climb: 1.0 m/s (200 ft/min)
