= Avia BH-27 =

Aircraft concept

BH-27

General information
- Type: Civil utility aircraft
- Manufacturer: Avia
- Designer: Pavel Beneš and Miroslav Hajn
- Status: cancelled

The Avia BH-27 was a high-wing utility monoplane aircraft concept, designed in Czechoslovakia in the late 1920s. It would have seated three passengers within an enclosed cabin, and would have been powered by an 82 kW (110 hp) Walter engine. Development was cancelled, however, before any prototype was built.

== Specifications ==
General characteristics

- Crew: one, pilot
- Capacity: three passengers
- Powerplant: 1 × Walter radial engine , 82 kW (110 hp)
