= Avia BH-3 =

Fighter plane

Avia BH-3 (B3)
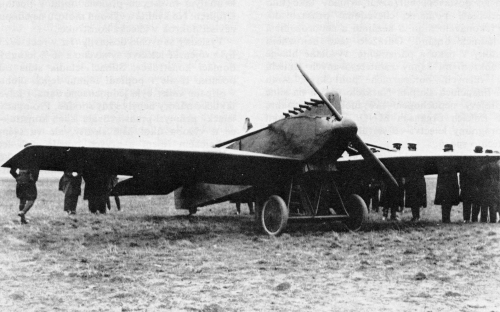
- Avia BH-3 racing version

General information
- Type: Fighter
- Manufacturer: Avia
- Designer: Pavel Beneš and Miroslav Hajn
- Primary user: Czechoslovak Air Force
- Number built: 14

History
- Introduction date: 1923
- First flight: 16 December 1921
- Retired: 1927

The Avia BH-3 was a fighter plane built in Czechoslovakia in 1921. Conceptually a descendant of the BH-1 sports plane, it was a braced, low-wing monoplane of conventional configuration and tailskid undercarriage. Following favourable trials in June 1921, ten examples were ordered by the Czechoslovak Air Force. These were delivered in 1923 under the military designation B.3. The type proved temperamental in service and was soon relegated to training duties, where it served until 1927.

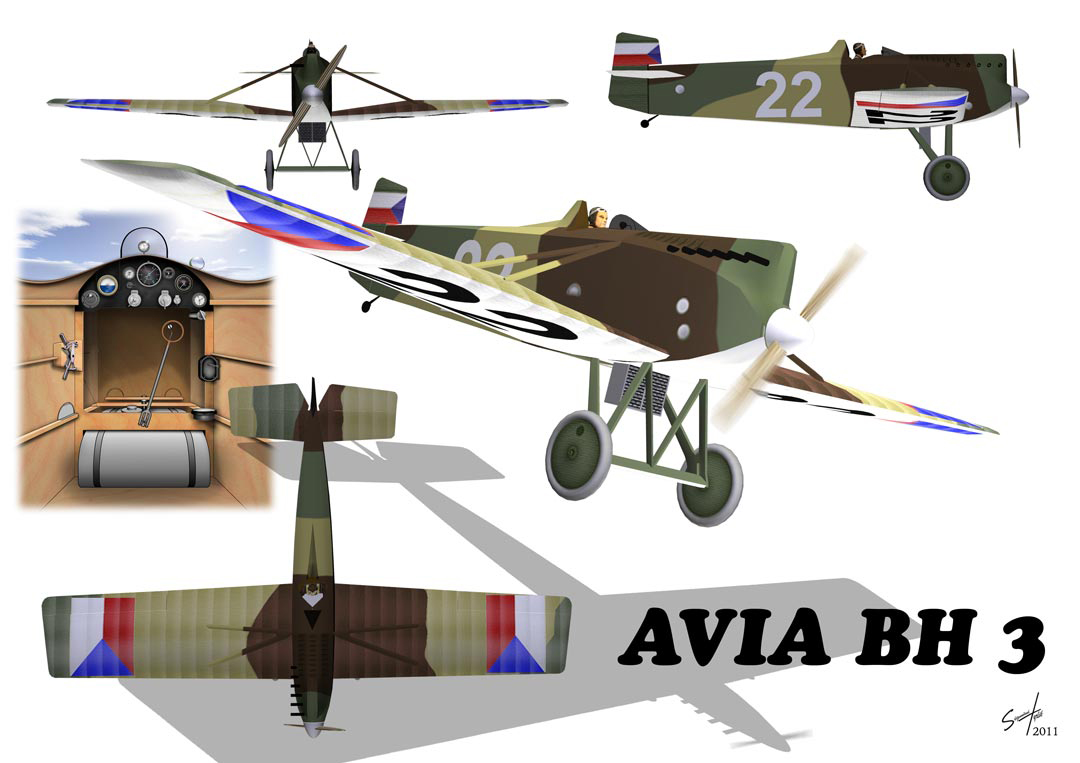
Avia BH-3 montage

== Units using this aircraft ==
- 1st Airborne Regiment, Czechoslovak Air Force

== Specifications ==
Data from Monografie: Avia BH-3

General characteristics

- Crew: one pilot
- Length: 6.98 m (22 ft 11 in)
- Wingspan: 10.24 m (33 ft 7 in)
- Height: 2.77 m (9 ft 1 in)
- Wing area: 15.76 m^{2} (169.6 sq ft)
- Empty weight: 736 kg (1,623 lb)
- Gross weight: 1,025 kg (2,260 lb)
- Powerplant: 1 × BMW IIIa inline , 136 kW (182 hp)

Performance

- Maximum speed: 225 km/h (140 mph, 121 kn) at sea level; 240 km/h (150 mph; 130 kn) at 4,000 m (13,000 ft)
- Range: 450 km (280 mi, 240 nmi)
- Service ceiling: 8,000 m (26,000 ft)
- Time to altitude: 1 min 50 s to 1,000 m (3,300 ft)

Armament

- 2 × fixed, forward-firing .303 Vickers machine guns

== See also ==
Related development

- BH-1

Related lists

- List of Interwar military aircraft
