= Avia D =

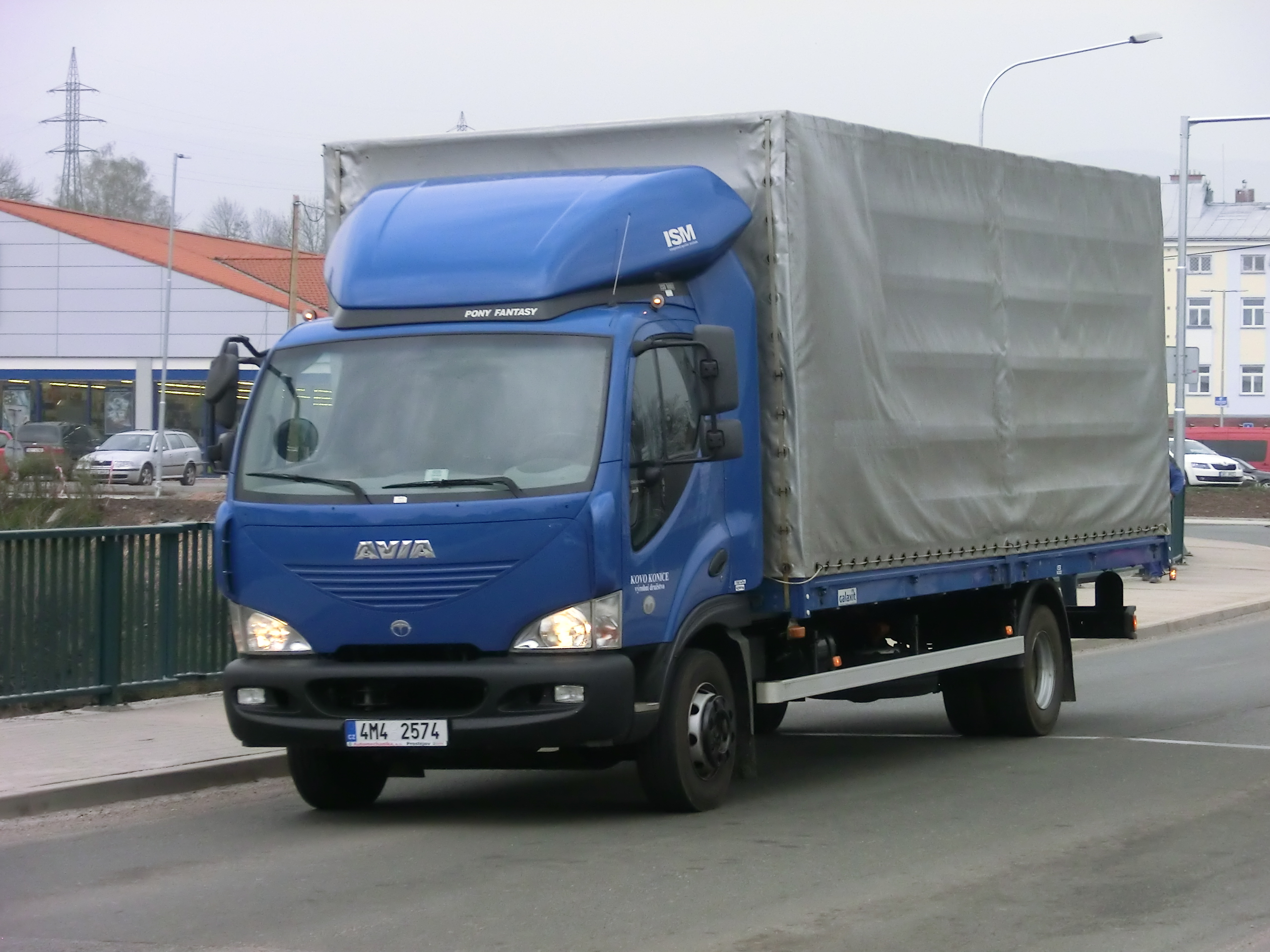

Overview
- Manufacturer: Avia
- Also called: Daewoo AD-100; Ashok Leyland Boss
- Production: 2000-present
- Assembly: Czech Republic

Body and chassis
- Class: Medium truck

Powertrain
- Engine: Diesel Cummins ISB4.5

Chronology
- Predecessor: Avia A-series

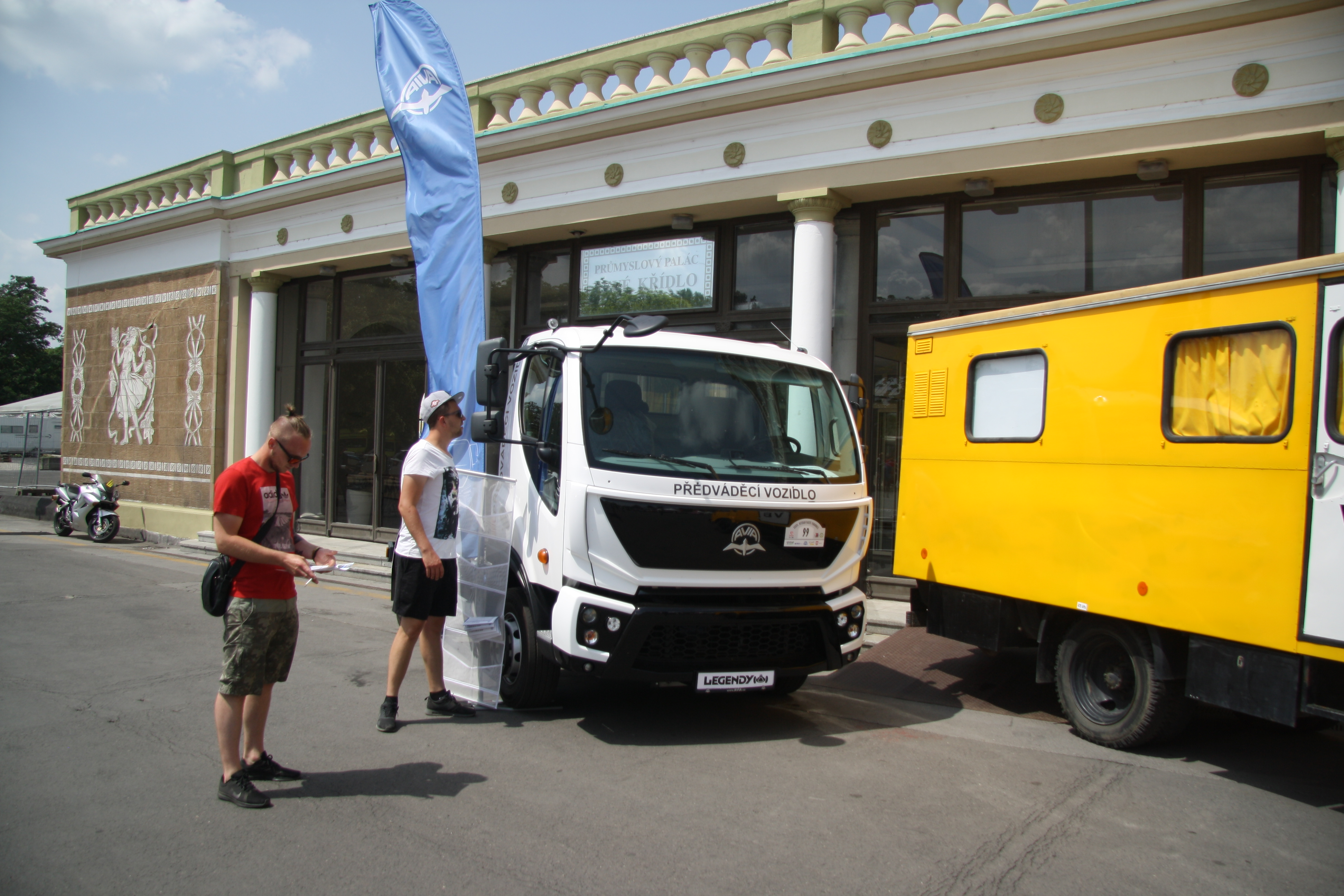
Avia D 90 Initia

Avia D is a medium truck model line made by the Czech company Avia in Prague's Letňany. Since 2000, they have replaced the Avia A 60/65/70/75/80 series. Modifications of the series were: Avia D 60/65/75/80/85/90/100/110/120 and Avia D 120 4x4. Trucks have complied with the Euro-5 standard. The Avia D 75 (without engine and gearbox) was supplied, for example, to the British company Smith's Electric Vehicles (SEV), which built all-electric trucks from them.

In the Czech Republic, production was terminated in 2013. Production was transferred to India, where it continued to be built under the name Ashok Leyland Boss. After the Avia was bought by the Czech company CSG, production in the Czech Republic recommenced in September 2017; this facelift variant was named Avia D Initia and meets the Euro-6 standard.

== Specifications ==
- motor: Cummins ISB4.5, 4-cylinder with direct fuel injection and turbocharger
- displacement: 4.5 L
- max. power : 117 kW (159 PS) - 152 kW (207 PS) @ 2500 rpm
- max. torque : 602 N⋅m (444 ft⋅lbf) - 760 N⋅m (561 ft⋅lbf) @ 1700 rpm
- top speed: 118 km/h
- dimensions: 5,800 x 2,200 x 2,390-2,520 mm
- total weight: 6,000-12,000 kg
- fuel tank capacity: 120-200 l
- transmission: ZF6S850, 6-speed, fully synchronized

== Facelift ==
The Czech company CSG purchased the Avia brand from the Indian owners in April 2016 and decided to renew the Avia D production in the Czech Republic. The production was moved from Letňany to Přelouč. In June 2017, a new facelifted Avia D (Euro5) was introduced at the Moscow fair. Production of the new Avia D Initia was launched in September 2017. These new trucks meet the Euro-6 emission standard and have Cummins ISB 4.5l four-cylinder engines (150, 180 and 210 PS). Initia presents a new vehicle mask, as well as the updated technology and equipment. The company wants to produce about 360-400 units annually.

Since 2019, the company has abandoned the lower models D75 and D90 Initia and only continues to produce D120 Initia 4x4 (134 or 152 kW).
