= Avia Motors =

Czech vehicle manufacturer

Avia Motors s.r.o.
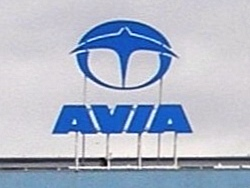
- Type: Private
- Industry: Automotive
- Founded: 1919
- Founders: Pavel Beneš; Miroslav Hajn
- Fate: Discontinued production in 2013
- Headquarters: Prague, Czechoslovakia
- Parent: Škoda Works (1928–1945); Czechoslovak Group
- Website: avia.cz

Avia Motors s.r.o. was a Czechoslovak automotive manufacturer (Saviem SG). Founded in 1919 as an aircraft maker, it diversified into trucks after 1945. As an aircraft maker it was notable for producing biplane fighter aircraft, especially the B-534. This Avia ceased aircraft production in 1963. The factory went bankrupt in 2013.

== History ==
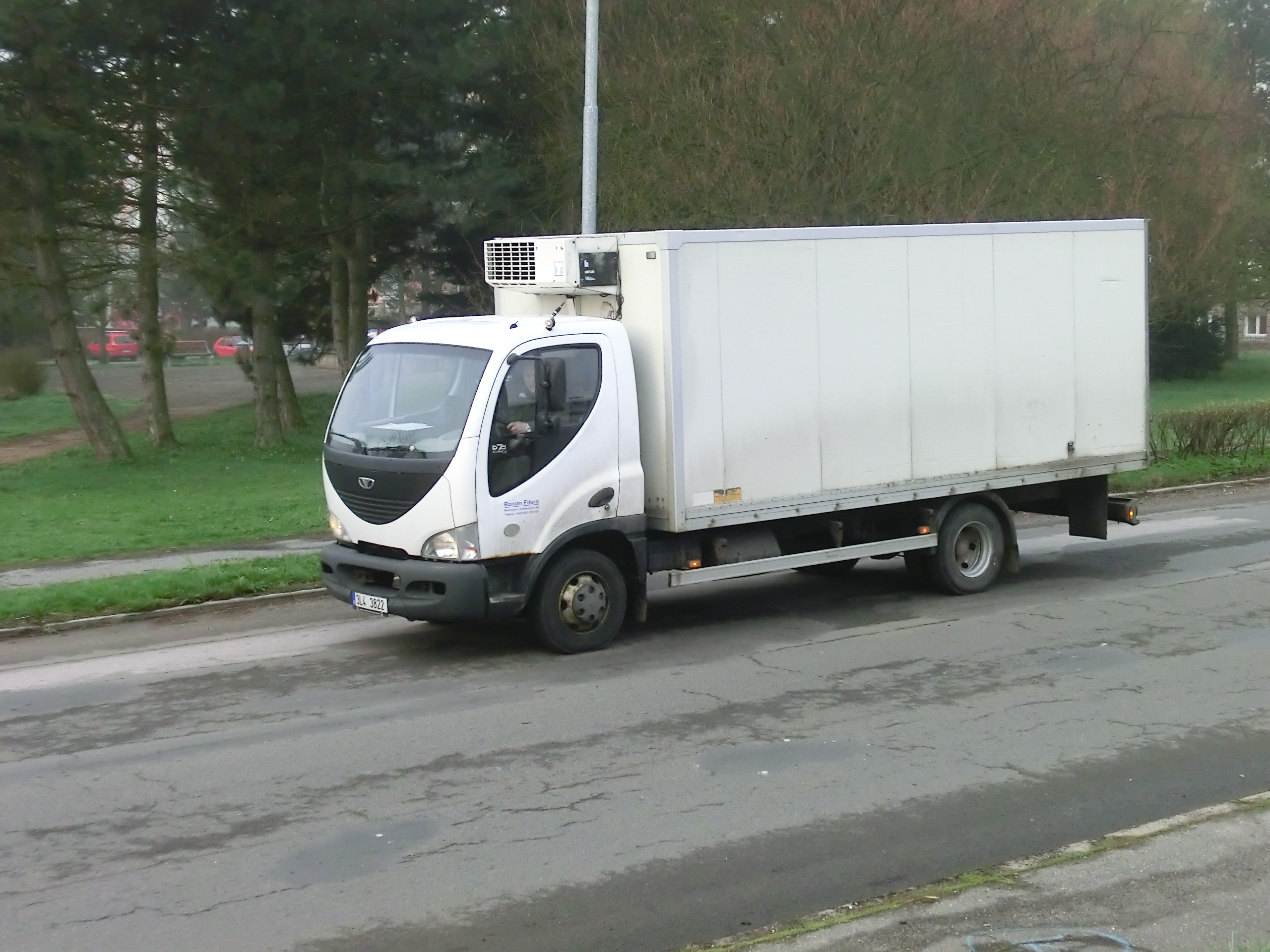
Avia-D75

The company was founded by Pavel Beneš, Miroslav Hajn, Jaroslav František Koch and Václav Malý in 1919 as the Avia Akciová společnost pro průmysl letecký (Avia Joint Stock Aircraft Industry Company) and became part of Škoda Works a.s. in 1928. During the 1930s, the factory became the biggest aircraft producer in Czechoslovakia and moved to Letňany near Prague, where production continues to this day. During the Nazi occupation Avia made aircraft for the German Luftwaffe. After the war the company was nationalized and became involved in the automotive industry. It made aircraft until 1963, then concentrated on truck production and continued to make aircraft engines (producing only propellers from 1988). The company was split in 1992 into propeller and truck sections, both using the Avia brand.

== Trucks ==
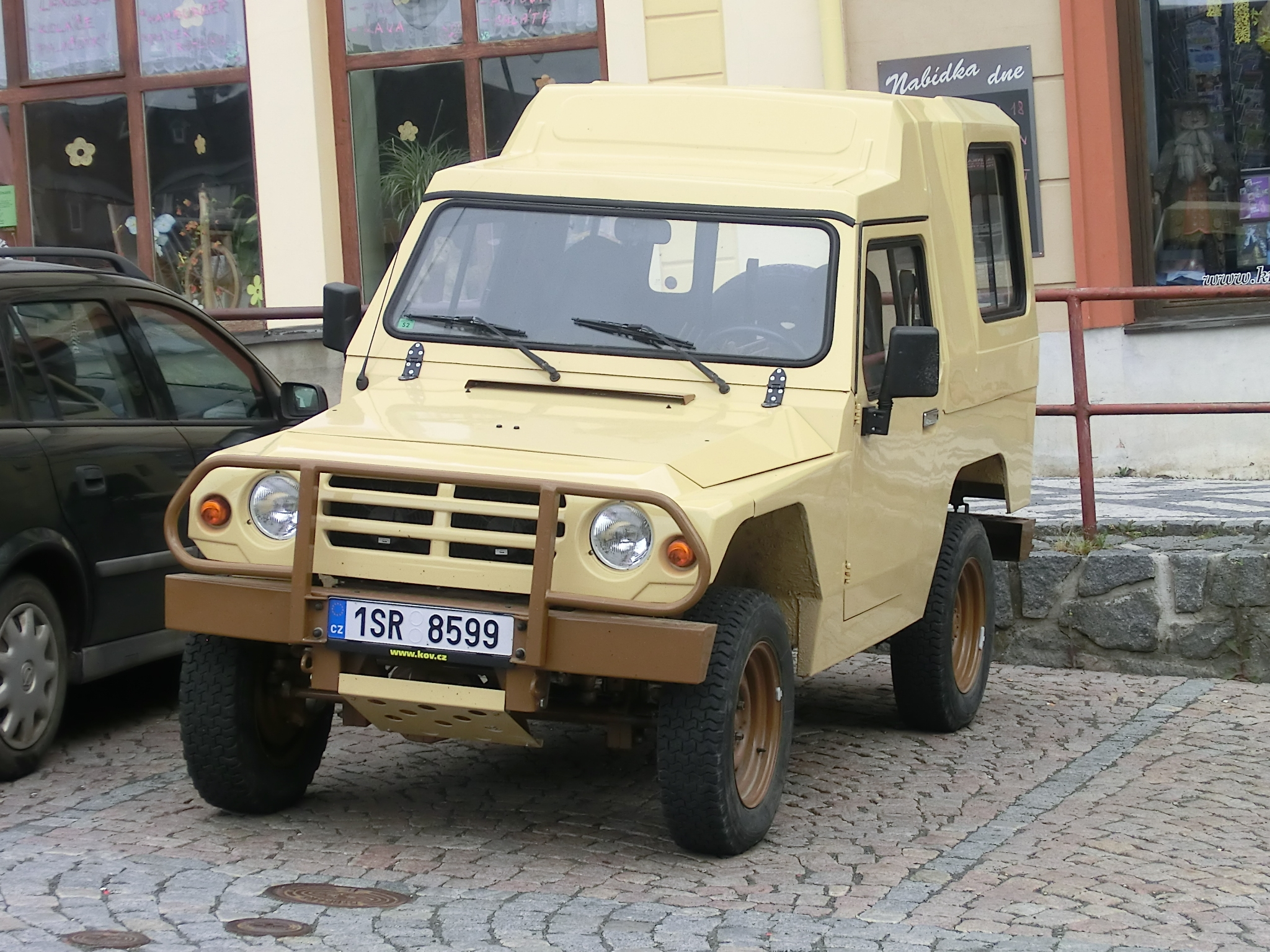
Avia A11 Trend 1 (a license built Auverland A3).

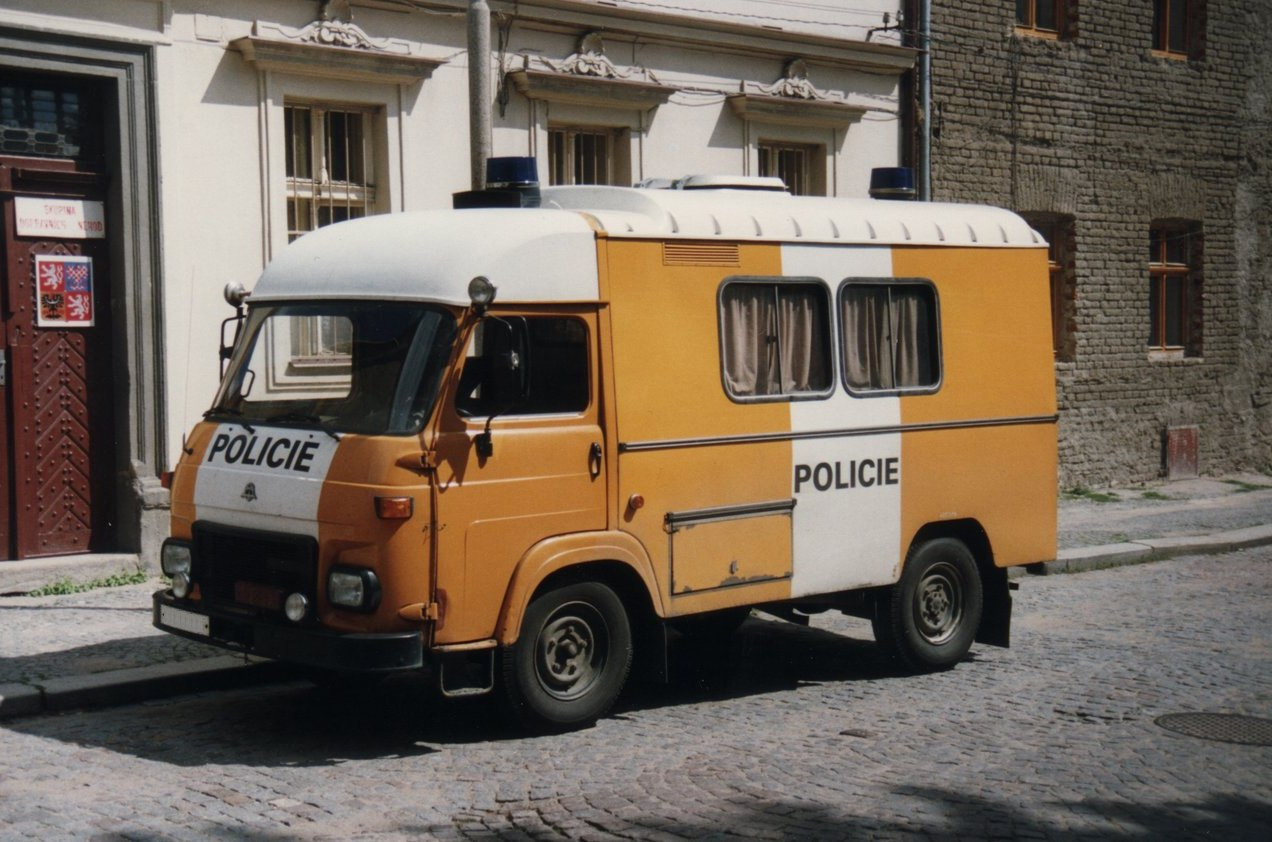
Avia A15 police van

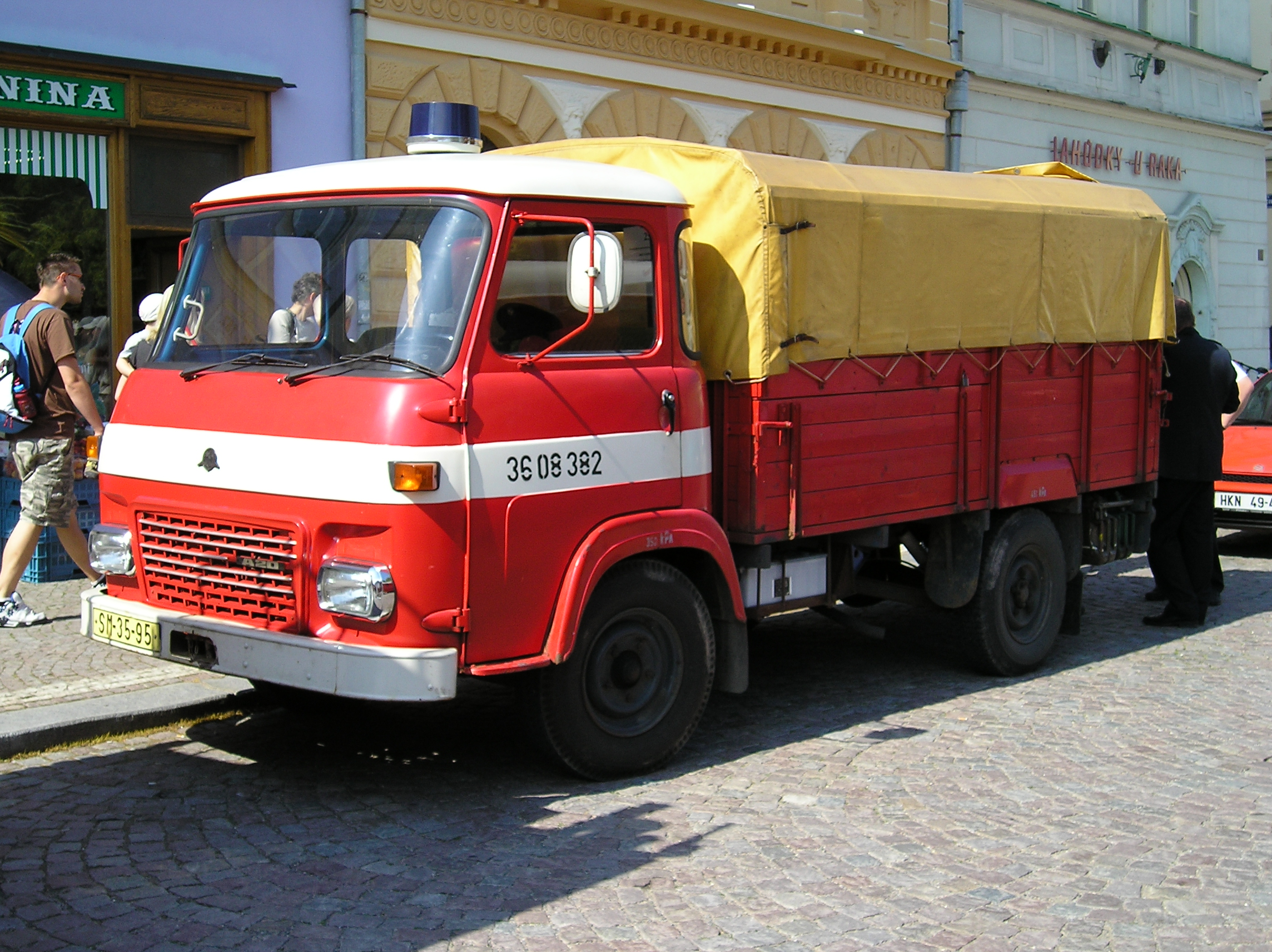
Avia A20 firetruck

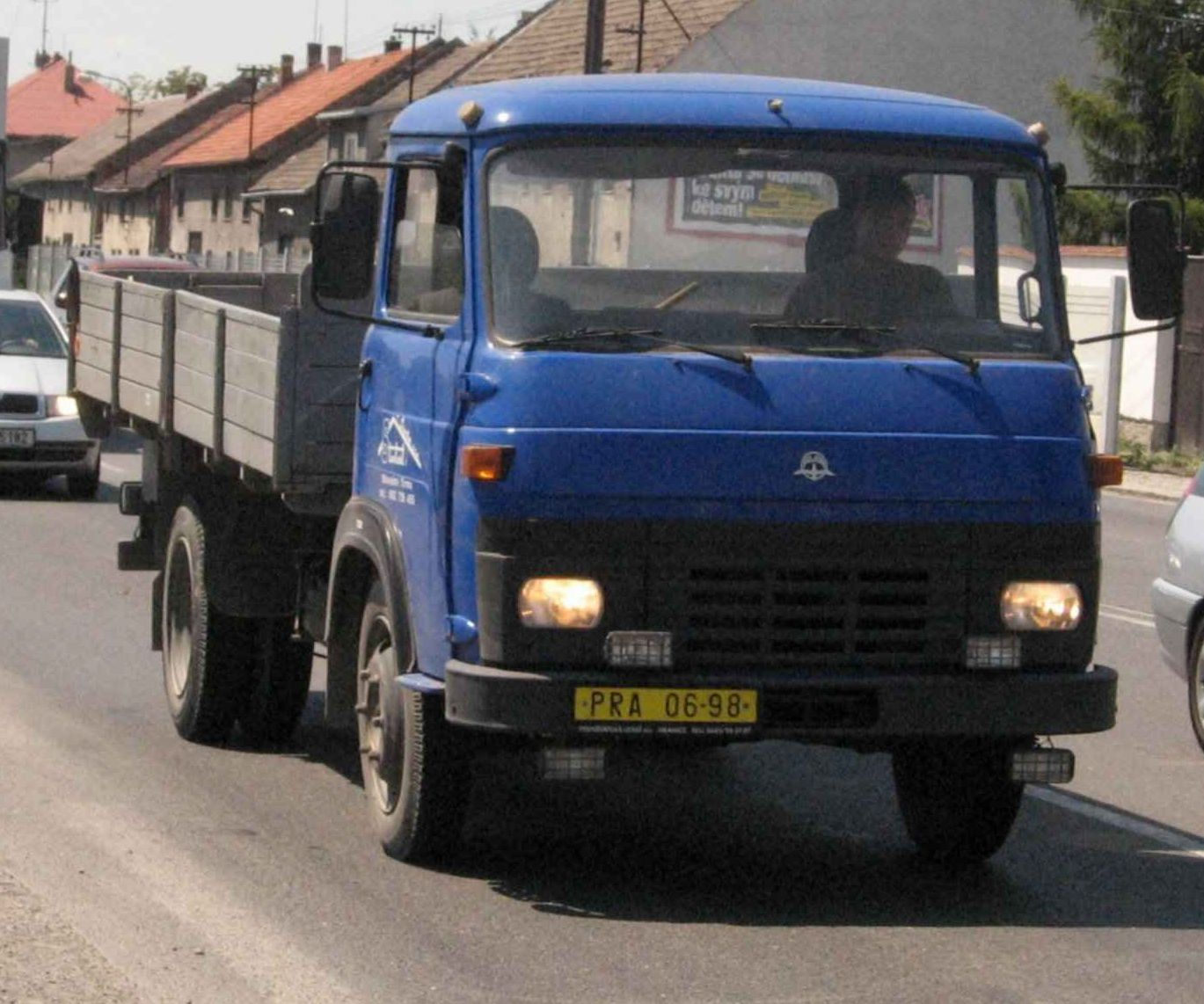
Avia A31 Turbo

=== Early years ===
Soon after the war, the manufacture of fuel injection pumps, jets and roller bearings for freight vehicle transport was implemented in Avia. The factory also provided repair of trucks. In the post-war reorganization of Czechoslovak industry it was later decided that Avia would be fully transformed into making new commercial vehicles. As early as 1946 a prototype of the Škoda R-706 vehicle was developed, and the first vehicle and bus series was built in 1947. These products were successfully exported to many countries

At first the enterprise concentrated on assembling T-805 vehicles. In 1961 it switched to making the Praga V3S/S5T medium duty truck. The legendary three-tone off-road V3S was maintained in Avia's manufacturing program until 1988. The vehicle was built not only as a platform car but with different types of bodies as well. It fully utilised its construction designed for extraordinarily heavy use in the army, on site, in forest as well as in any other operation demanding a high performance under the heaviest conditions. The modifications of the Praga S5T model also included a semitrailer truck, the S5T-TN model with a "trambus" cab. In 1963 Avia began making chassis units for the OT 64 (SKOT) armoured carrier. Praga and Tatra enterprises, and also some Polish makers took part in the manufacture.

=== The golden era of the company ===
In 1965 structural changes of demand concerning a small tonnage lorry appeared in both national and international markets. The Avia enterprise considered two ways ahead: developing its own new models and/or buying licences to build trucks designed by another company. The outcome was that Avia purchased licences from the French Renault-Saviem company to build two types of truck. Series production of the new trucks began in autumn 1968. The larger vehicle was the Renault-SG 4 Super Galion (later Avia A30), and the smaller was the SG 2 Super Goelette (later Avia A15).

The manufacture of the new models required new buildings as well as modernization of existing enterprises' premises. New buildings housing advanced equipment were built, and Avia became among the largest Czechoslovak vehicle manufacturers. Annual production reached 17,000 vehicles. Over the years the Avia models were continuously modernized. The displacement of the diesel engine increased from original 3.32 to 3.61 litres, and the new engines were fitted to nearly all Avia trucks. In 1983 the Avia A31 was developed from the Avia A30 model, and the Avia A15 (later A20) furgon was succeeded by the Avia A21 model. From 1974 to 1978 the A20, 30, and 40 models were modernized with smaller wheels, redesigned axles, new dashboard, enhanced cab interior, and other modernizations.

In 1986, the Avia National Concern, including affiliated operations in Brno, Ivančice and Žilina was incorporated in a so-called "Industry Economical Unit" together with Praga, BSS, Metaz and Kutná Hora enterprises. As per 1 July 1988, a new state enterprise, Avia Concern, comprising Avia, Praga, BSS, and Dačické Strojírny. Concern enterprises were established in accordance with the State Enterprise Act. Avia Letňany, as the parent factory, made engines and cabs and assembled all the chassis. Part of the chassis was fitted with a platform-type superstructure and also vehicles with a furgon-type body were made there. The Brno, Ivančice and Žilina factories built superstructures for assembly on the chassis. The Kutná Hora factory made all types of axles for Avia vehicles. The major output of the Praga Concern Enterprise included truck and bus gear units and a number of other parts for the automotive field. The Dačické strojírny Concern Enterprise produced parts for car manufacturers. The body assortment was still growing: box bodies, isothermic box bodies, bodies including a cooling unit, assembly platforms, container bodies, dumpers, towing trucks, and other different bodies were made. The Avia chassis was also a base for the small buses built in Bulgaria, Yugoslavia and Hungary.

In 1989 the concern was split into separate businesses. In the same year, Avia Letňany launched assembly of A21 FC furgons by use of pressed parts. In 1993 Avia launched the models A21T and A31T, equipped with turbo engines. At the same time, the engine power of these vehicles was increased to 65 kW, which met the Euro I Standard. Later an engine with the power increased up to 76 kW (or 85 kW) and intercooler meeting the Euro II Standard was developed. Enhancements also included a modified chassis, strengthened drive unit, power steering system, modified braking system, improved cab interior and enhanced technical parameters of the vehicle.

In 1992 Avia was turned into a stock company, and also Avia-Hamilton Standard, a new company with Avia's equity share making aircraft propellers, was founded. One year later propeller manufacture was moved from the Letňany factory to the new premises near Stará Boleslav. This definitively terminated the aircraft production in Letňany.

=== Daewoo subsidiary ===
66% of the Avia Company was privatized by Czech entities in two waves. To ensure the further development of the company, the government began to seek a foreign investor. The relevant discussions were led with several parties concerned. In the first line, it was Renault, the French car maker, with which Avia already had good long-term experience; followed by the German Mercedes-Benz company. However, the 1995 public tender was won by a consortium formed by Daewoo of South Korea and Steyr-Daimler-Puch of Austria. The consortium was incorporated in the Netherlands as Daewoo Steyr B.V. It bought 50.2% of Avia's shares, making it the majority owner of the company. A year later the company's trading was changed to Daewoo Avia, A.S. In the same year, the company became the exclusive importer and distributor of Daewoo vehicles for the Czech Republic.

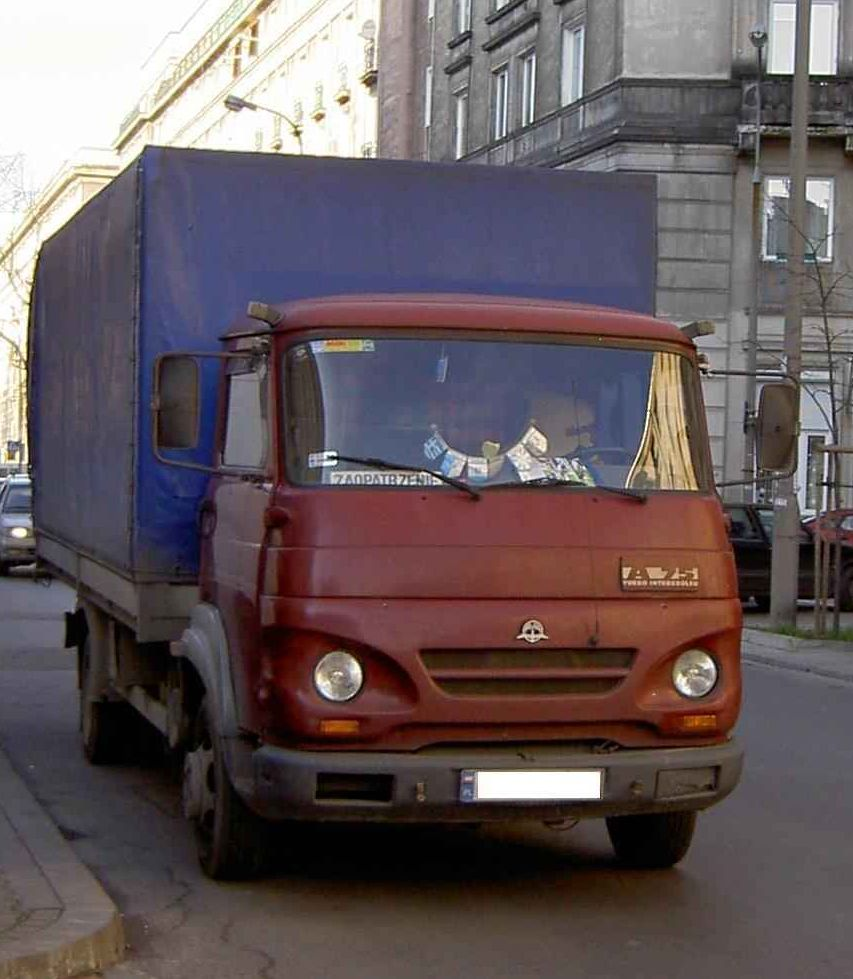
Avia A75

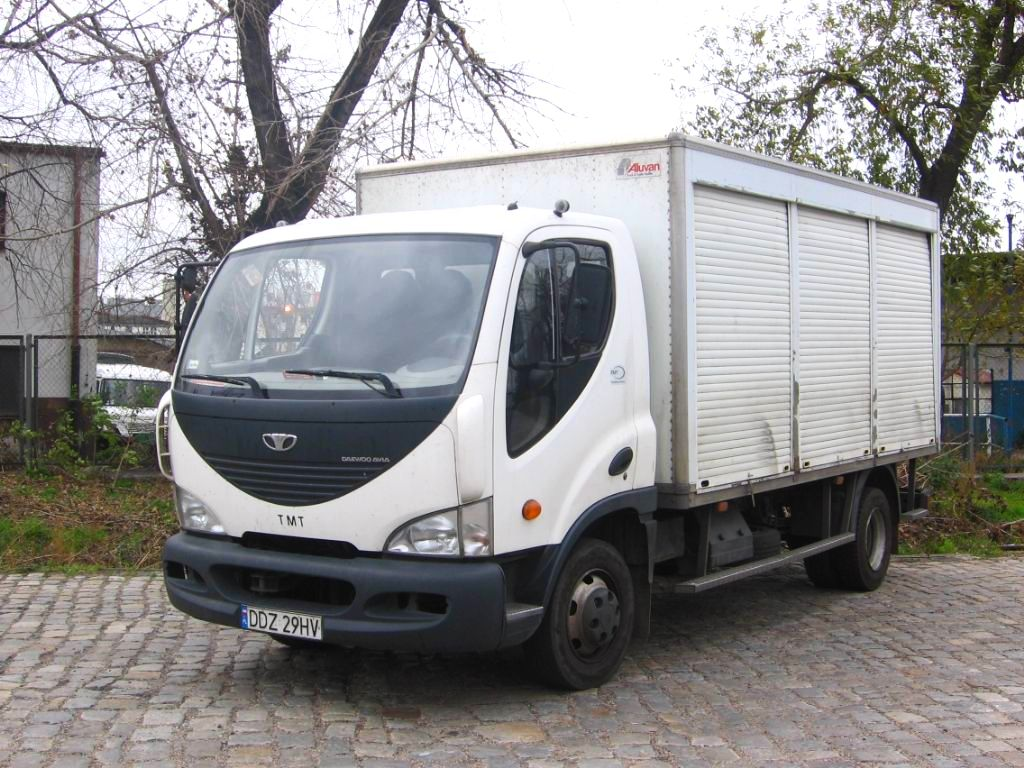
Avia D 90

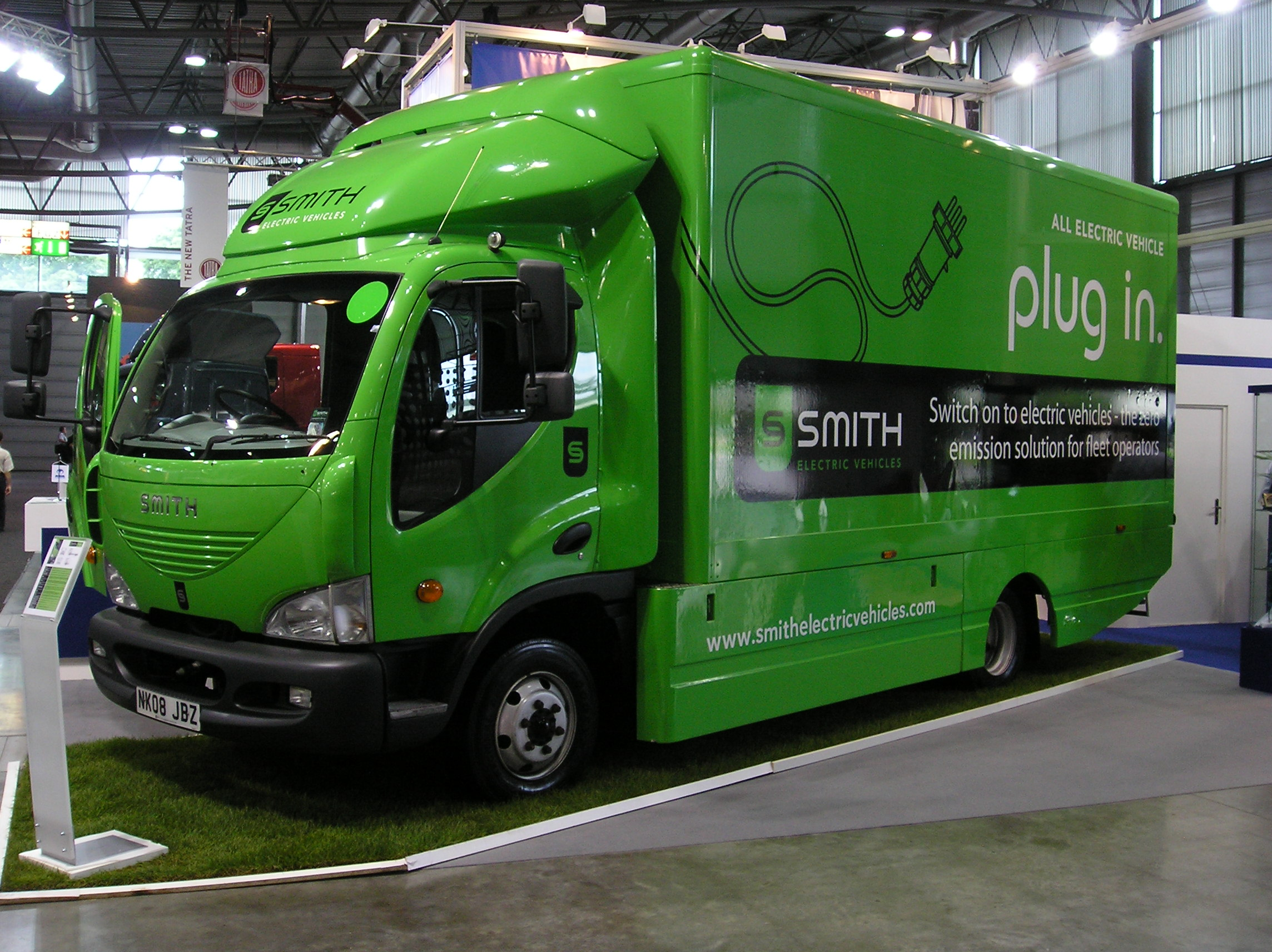
Smith's all-electric truck based on Avia chassis and cab

In 1997 the Avia A Series was modernized for the last time. Avia A 60/ 65/ 75/ 80 models were launched. The vehicles had a completely new chassis fitted with a riveted frame, fixed front axle, front disc brakes, smaller wheels 205/75 – 17.50" and Euro II engines with the power of 76 kW and/or 85 kW. The vehicles had a five-speed/six-speed gear-box. The cabs had a new interior, advanced design and they were tilt cabs in the first line. Generally, 250,000 Avia A Series vehicles, which can be seen in high numbers on our roads even today, left the assembly line of the Letňany car factory in the period between launching the production in 1968 up to its termination, which took place on 13 November 2000. From 1997 to 1999, the Letňany car factory was also assembling Lublin and Lublin II light commercial vehicles imported disassembled from the Daewoo Motor Poland company.

At the same time development of a completely new product continued. Daewoo Avia's new Korean management team set a demanding goal consisting of development and manufacturing of a completely new medium duty truck, which would cover the 6 to 9 tonnes gvw (gross vehicle weight) class and would be fully competitive in Western European markets and further afield in terms of design and operating costs. The vehicle cab, which was styled in Italy and provided maximum comfort both to driver and crew, was the most significant new component of the vehicle. The designers at Daewoo's engineering centre in Worthing, UK, led the development of the new cab and its interior, while Daewoo Avia specialist designers at the Letnany factory were responsible for the project co-ordination, and engine/chassis development. Total cost of the project was more than $160 million, split about 50–50 between R&D and manufacturing upgrades. The main manufacturing investments were the new Eisenmann water-based paint plant, including the e-coat plant which was installed to degrease, prepare and prime the cabs by full electro-cataphoretic full immersion process, and a new cab welding line.

The parent Korean Daewoo company went bankrupt in 1999, so the Prague factory was reconstituted in 2000 as an independent business. Much of the ongoing development work was funded by selling local real estate owned by the company including the company-owned workers' flats in Letňany.

A new vehicle, called the Avia D Series, was launched at the Brno truck show in June 2000. Along with its new cab, Daewoo Avia also launched its new D432-100 engine which met EEC R49-03 (Euro 3) without electronic control or EGR technology. Plans to enter Western European market also meant that the Cummins ISBe range of engines was installed as an option, as this engine made the vehicle more marketable. Initially available with the 150 hp Cummins ISBe 150 30 engine, made by Cummins Engine Company in Darlington, UK. This engine was also available as a derated 130 hp variant and in 2003 a 170 hp version was also launched. The Cummins engine, with its flat torque curve, demonstrated good fuel consumption and better performance on long journeys. From launch, the D Series was available with the ZF S5-42 five-speed gear-box and the six-speed cable-shift ZF S6-850 was launched as a compatible gearbox with the 170 hp Cummins. The D75 (7.5 t gvw) proved particularly popular in the UK and Ireland.

=== Ashok Leyland ownership ===
By 2004 continued losses at the factory meant a take-over was inevitable for its survival. A Czech-based investment company Odien started negotiations to buy the Daewoo Steyr B.V. 50.2% share holding—a process completed in early 2005. Odien carried out a complete physical and financial restructuring of the company which saw the truck business unit reduced from 120 buildings on an 88 hectares (220 acres) site to only four buildings on 4 hectares (9.9 acres). As part of the restructuring, production of the Daewoo Avia D432-100 engine was halted. Under Odien's ownership the Avia brand was reintroduced with a new logo, and development of the Euro IV compliant models and a new 12 t gvm model, the D120, were begun. After discussions with several overseas manufacturers, Odien sold the truck business unit to Ashok Leyland of India in October 2006.

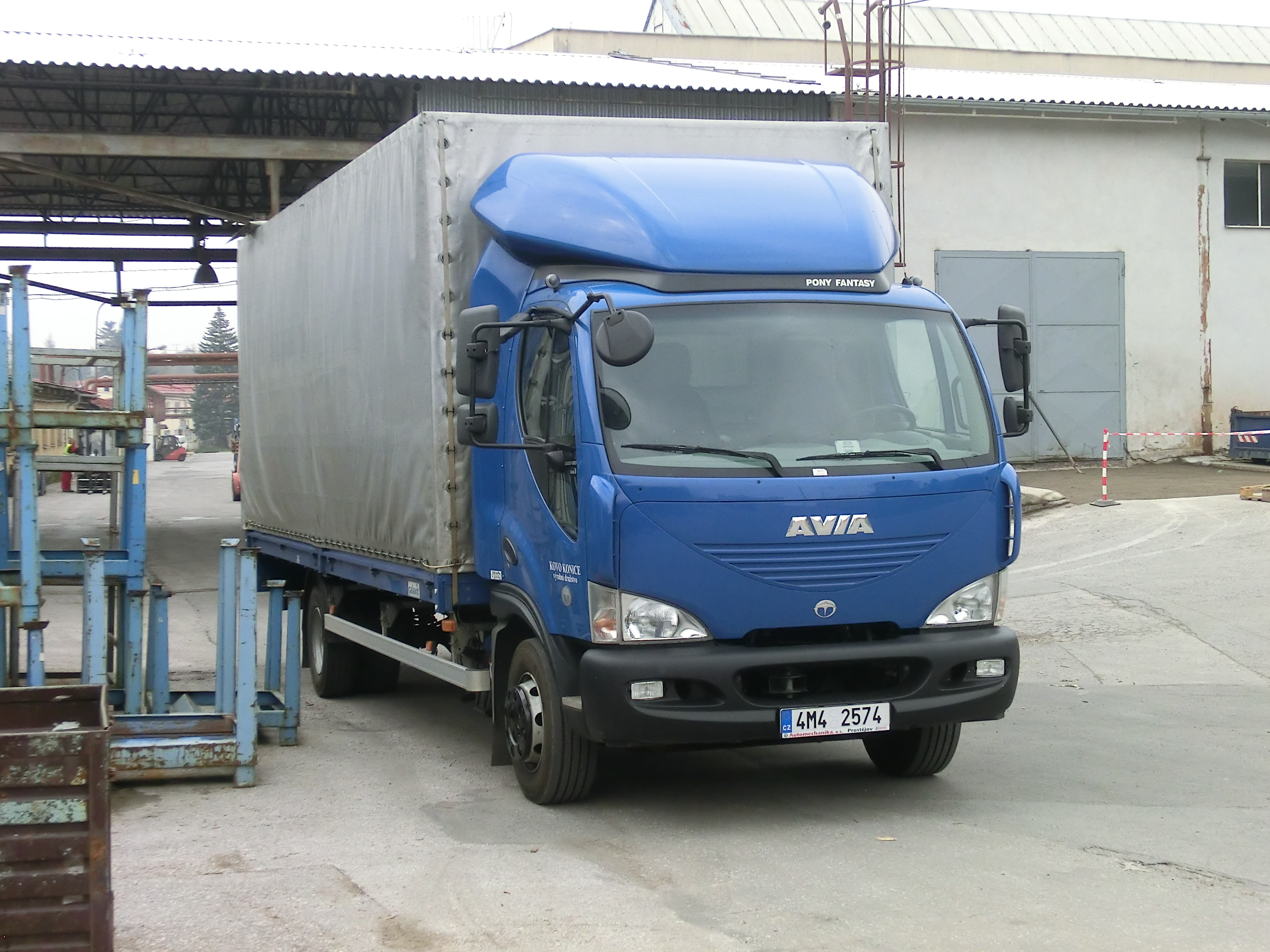
Avia D 120

Avia began a new era after the acquisition . A new company "Avia Ashok Leyland Motors SRO (AALM)" was formed. Sales in 2006 reached 650 units. Sales demand remained strong in the home market and in the UK, Spain, Hungary and Ireland. In 2006 in Ireland, Avia had a 16% market share of its segment. In 2006 the new 160 and 185 hp Cummins powered Euro IV models and the D120 were launched, the latter with gcw (gross combination weight) of up to 22000 kg for drawbar operation.

In 2007 collaboration with the Tanfield Group of the UK saw the introduction of an "electric Avia", with AALM providing chassis cabs less engines, gearboxes and other diesel truck components to Tanfield subsidiary Smith Electric Vehicles for the Smith Newton all-electric truck. This was a successful collaboration with the shipment of engineless trucks forming a large proportion of Avia's sales. Hundreds of Smith Electric trucks with chassis and cabs from Prague are now in use in the USA.

Euro V launch in 2009 saw a further increase in power outputs, with 185 and 207 hp variants of the four-cylinder Cummins ISBe Euro V available. The weight range continued to span from 6 to 12 tonnes gvw.

2010 and 2011 were period of success for the brand both domestically and in foreign markets. Ashok Leyland helped Avia not only overcome the crisis in 2008–09, but in joint projects opened up new markets. As a result, Avia has developed from a local truck manufacturer for Central and Eastern Europe to being a global brand. Avia was sold in Europe, the US, Middle East, Asia, Argentina and Russia. Smith's electric trucks were sold in the UK and USA, where the government was then promoting the purchase of electrified vehicles by financial subsidies.

Avia fares well in Russia with joint production of small buses in partnership with Volgabus. The Russian version, called "Rhytmix", was launched in October 2011. The prototype of eight-metre long bus in design for the European Union were planned to be unveiled later, but it did not happen.

In 2013 Ashok Leyand closed production in the Czech Republic and moved it to India. There it continued to produce vehicles based on Avia cabins, which were named Ashok Leyland Boss and Ashok Leyland Guru.

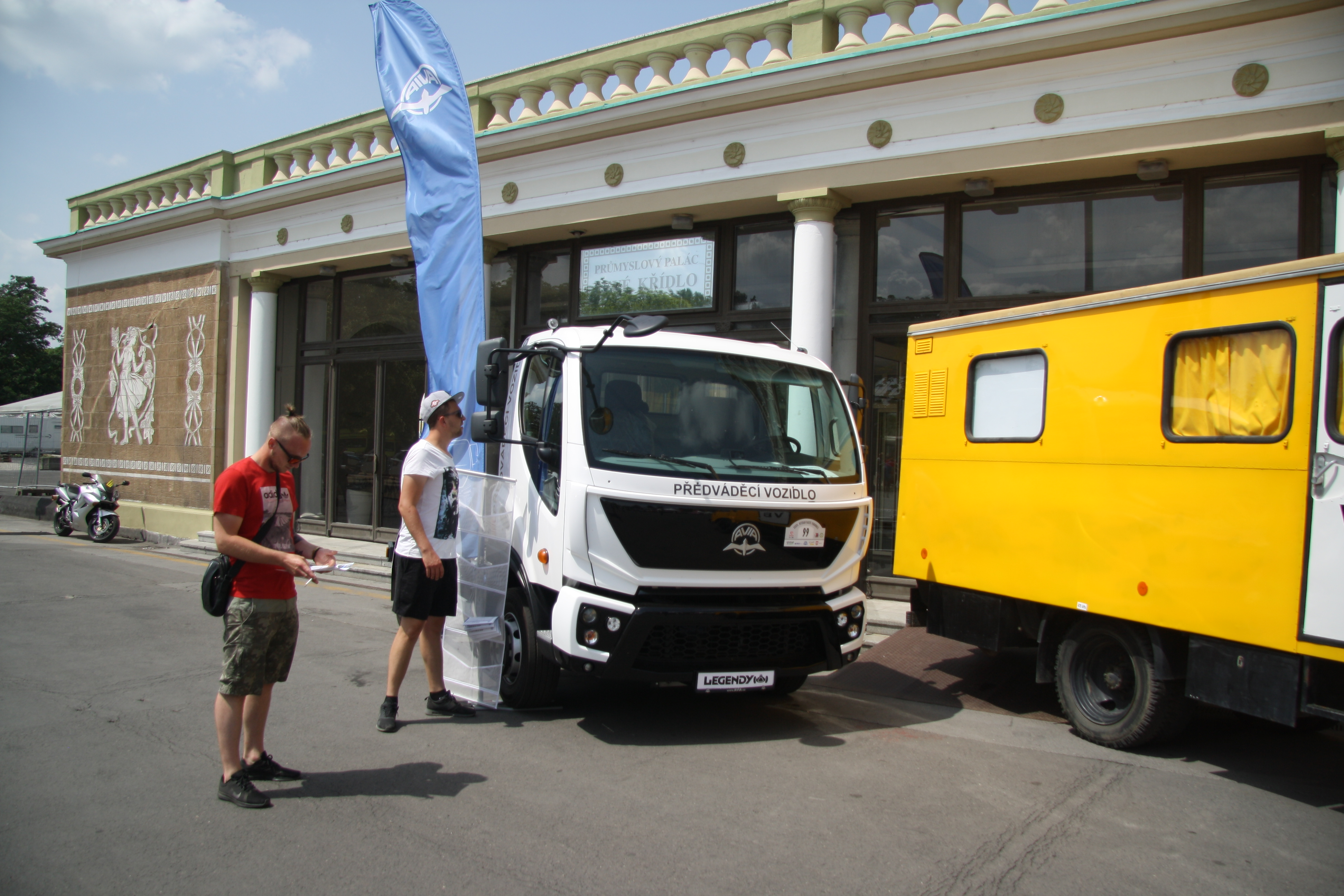
Avia D 90 Initia

=== Czechoslovak Group ownership ===
In April 2016 the Czechoslovak Group based in Ostrava bought Avia from Ashok Leyland. Avia will no longer be made in Letňany, but in the industrial zone in Přelouč.

Avia launched a new model line Avia D Initia in September 2017. The medium trucks meet emission class Euro VI and include four-cylinder motors Cummins ISB 4.5l (150, 180 and 210 hp). The company wants to make about 360–400 trucks a year.

== Race cars ==
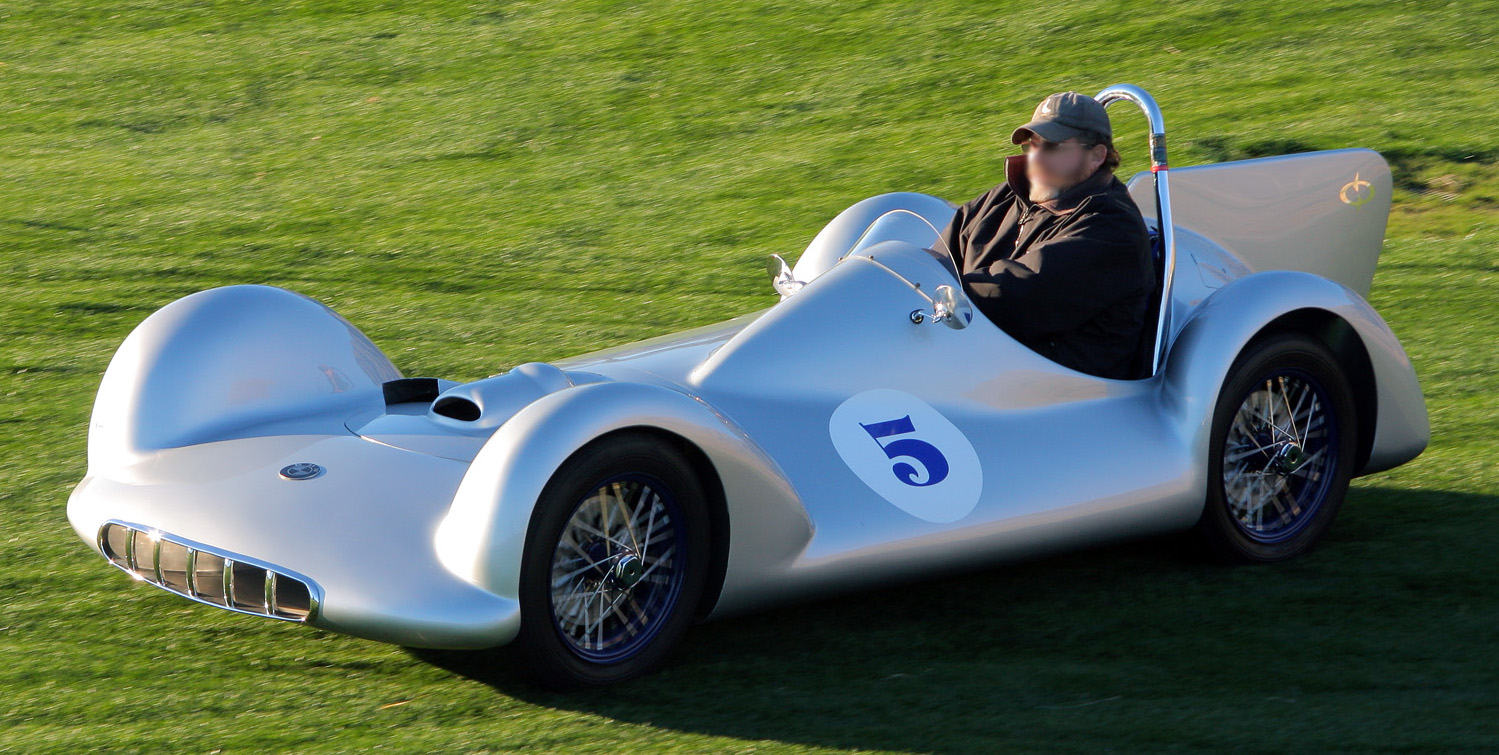
1956 Avia 750 MKIII

In 1956 and 1957, Avia made a small series of twelve (or fifteen) light cars, made entirely from aluminium sheet. The cars have a single centrally-placed driver's seat and steering column up front and two rear seats, a sliding cabin for access, and a rear-mounted two-cylinder engine with the same displacement as the 350cc Jawa motorcycle engine, but it was a completely different development. The engine produced 15 PS (11 kW). At least 3 examples of this car still survive, number 3, 6 and 10. The last one is reported as stolen and moved to Slovakia (Bardejov area, with new SK registration).

The monoposto streamliner Avia 750 MKIII is a different development with BMW 750cc 4 stroke engine. This car was built in Czechoslovakia in 1956, it excels in great aerodynamics and weighs only 400 kg. In the 1980s, the car appeared in a West German museum, in 1987, the car was sold and traveled to Los Angeles, a year later, it was sold at auction to New Zealand, then it was bought by a company in Redmond, Washington. In 2010, the car was bought by the Symbolic Motor Car Company from San Diego for $ 149,000.

== Aircraft ==
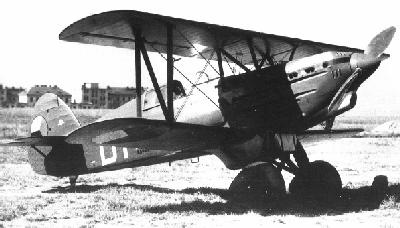
Avia B-534

Before the Second World War the company made civilian and military aircraft, including the Avia BH-1, Avia BH-21, Avia B-534 and Avia B-71 (Soviet licensed Tupolev SB).

In the Second World War, Avia was ordered to build Messerschmitt Bf 109G fighter aircraft. After the war Avia continued production as the Avia S-99, but it soon ran out of the correct Daimler-Benz DB 605 engines. It therefore substituted the Junkers Jumo 211 engine and propeller designed for the Heinkel He 111 bomber and redesignated the aircraft as the Avia S-199.

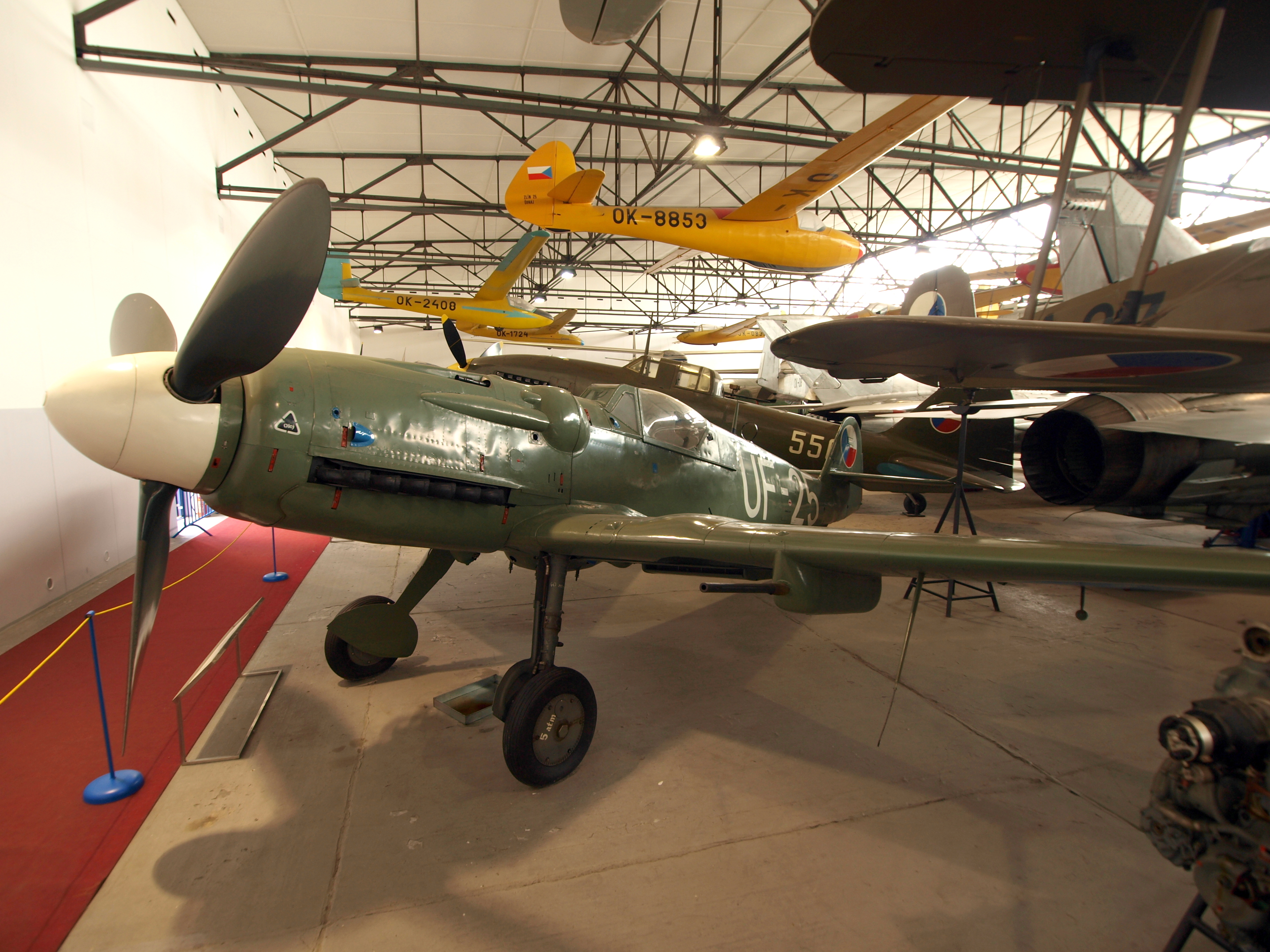
Avia S-199

The S-199 was the first fighter obtained by the Israeli Air Force for use during the War of Independence.

But the S-199 was a problematic aircraft, unpopular with its pilots. The Jumo engine was heavier and less responsive than the Daimler-Benz unit. The torque of the large paddle-bladed propeller made control difficult. This, combined with the 109's narrow-track undercarriage also made landings and take-offs more hazardous. Also the synchronization gear did not seem to work properly, leading a few Israeli aircraft to shoot off their own propellers.

Also during the war Germany built factories in Czechoslovakia to make the Messerschmitt Me 262 jet fighter. The factories survived the war intact, so after the war production continued as the Avia S-92.

The first S-92 was built at the Letňany Research Institute in 1945 with the airframe from Avia and the twin engines from the repair works in Malešice. Junkers developed the engines as the Jumo 004, and the Czechs redesignated them M-04). The S-92 first flew on 27 September 1946, with Avia's chief pilot Antonin Kraus in control. That same year on 10 December the CS-92 flew for the first time.

The first S-92 was delivered to the Czechoslovak Air Force on 6 February 1948. A total of 12 were made, nine S-92 and three CS-92, equipping the 5th Fighter Flight, until they were grounded for use as instructional airframes in 1951.

By the time Yugoslavia showed interest in buying the S-92, Avia was looking at closing down the production line to make way for newer upgraded aircraft. When Avia was granted a license to make the Mikoyan-Gurevich MiG-15 (they were originally slated to produce Yakovlev Yak-23, with no result, and the Czechoslovak Air Force S-101's were the original Yaks bought from the USSR) the S-92 production lines were dismantled.

Later Avia made the B-33, which is a licensed Ilyushin Il-10, and the Avia 14, which is a licensed Ilyushin Il-14 airliner able to carry 42 passengers. The Avia 14 became the largest aircraft ever made in Czechoslovakia.

Aircraft production ceased in 1960, and for several years only aircraft engines and propellers were manufactured for other Czechoslovak and foreign manufacturers.

=== List of aircraft ===
Model name	First flight	Number built	Type
Avia BH-1	1920	1	Single engine, two-seat sports plane
Avia BH-2		1	Single engine, single-seat sports plane
Avia BH-3	1921	14	Single engine monoplane fighter
Avia BH-4	1922	1	Prototype single engine monoplane fighter
Avia BH-5	1923	1	Single engine two-seat sports plane
Avia BH-6	1923	1	Prototype single engine biplane fighter
Avia BH-7	1923	2	Prototype single engine parasol fighter
Avia BH-8	1923	1	Prototype single engine biplane fighter
Avia BH-9	1923	11	Single engine, twin-seat sports plane
Avia BH-10	1924	~20	Single engine, single-seat sports plane
Avia BH-11	1923	~20	Single engine, two-seat sports plane
Avia BH-12	1924	1	Single engine monoplane sport airplane
Avia BH-14			12-passenger single engine airliner project
Avia BH-15			Two-seat reconnaissance aircraft project
Avia BH-16	1924		Single engine monoplane sport airplane
Avia BH-17	1924	24	Single engine biplane fighter
Avia BH-18			1924 twin engine, 32-passenger airliner project
Avia BH-19	1924	2	Single engine monoplane fighter
Avia BH-20	1924	1	Single engine monoplane trainer
Avia BH-21	1925	184	Single engine biplane fighter
Avia BH-22	1926	30	Single engine biplane trainer
Avia BH-23	1926	2	Single engine biplane night fighter
Avia BH-25	1926	12	Single engine biplane airliner
Avia BH-26	1927	~8	Single engine, two-seat armed reconnaissance biplane
Avia BH-27	N/A	0	Single engine monoplane utility airplane project
Avia BH-28	1927	1	Prototype single engine biplane reconnaissance airplane
Avia BH-29	1927	2	Single engine biplane trainer
Avia BH-30			Two-seat, single-engine trainer project
Avia BH-33	1927	~110	Single engine biplane fighter developed from the BH-21
Avia BH-35			1929 three engine mail/transport aircraft project
Avia BH-133		1	Prototype single-engine biplane fighter
Avia B-33	1951	1,200	Single engine ground attack airplane; Ilyushin Il-10 built under license
Avia B-34	1932	14	Single engine biplane fighter
Avia B-35	1938	3	Prototype single engine monoplane fighter; also known as Av-35
Avia B-36			1936 twin engine monoplane medium/heavy bomber project
Avia B-39			Bomber version of F.IX; also known as F.39
Avia B-40			10 passenger, three-engine, high-wing monoplane airliner project
Avia B-42			1932 two-seat high-wing reconnaissance/light bomber project
Avia B-46			Three engine monoplane bomber; Rohrbach Roterra built under license
Avia B-50			Three engine high-wing light transport project
Avia B-51	1933	3	Three engine, six passenger monoplane airliner
Avia B-56			Single engine monoplane transport project; led to the B-156
Avia B-57	1934	1	14 passenger, three engine, low-wing monoplane airliner prototype
Avia B-58	N/A	0	Twin engine medium bomber; led to the B-158
Avia B-63			Twin-engine monoplane heavy fighter, none built; Potez 630 built under license
Avia B-71			Twin engine monoplane bomber; Tupolev SB built under license
Avia B-109			Unbuilt export version of F.IX
Avia B-122	1934	3	Single-engine biplane aerobatic trainer
Avia B-134			B-34 with Walter Mistral 14 Kbs engine; only a project
Avia B-135	1938	12	Single engine monoplane fighter; also known as Av 135
Avia B-139			Unbuilt twin engine version of B-39
Avia B-156	1934	1	Single engine monoplane airliner; refined B-56
Avia B-157			Projected development of B-57
Avia B-158	1938	1	Twin engine monoplane light bomber; revised B.58
Avia B-228			Twin-engine jet bomber; Ilyushin Il-28 built under license
Avia B-234	N/A	1	B-34 with Avia Rr 29 engine; never flew
Avia B-334			B-34 with Armstrong Siddeley Panther engine; only a project
Avia B-434			B-34 with Hispano-Suiza Xbrs engine; only a project
Avia B-534	1933	568	Single engine biplane fighter
Avia B-634	1936	1	Prototype single engine biplane fighter
Avia Av-14	1956	203	Twin-engine monoplane airliner; Ilyushin Il-14 built under license
Avia Av-36	1946	2	Single piston monoplane utility airplane
Avia Av-37			Fighter project
Avia Av-38 Express			Twin boom, high-wing light transport project; two engines driving a single propeller
Avia Av-40			Tandem two-seat, low-wing fighter-trainer project
Avia Av-41 (I)			Fighter project
Avia Av-41 (II)			1946 twin-boom, high-wing light transport project; two tractor engines
Avia Av-42			Cantilever low-wing monoplane fighter project; intended to replace the S-199
Avia Av-43			Fighter project
Avia Av-45			Two-seat trainer project
Avia Av-46			Utility/observation light aircraft project
Avia Av-47			High-wing, twin-boom pusher utility/observation aircraft project
Avia Av-48			1949 single engine, twin-boom, high-wing light aircraft project
Avia Av-49			High-wing, twin-boom utility/observation light aircraft project
Avia Av-50			1949 twin-engine, low-wing, medium transport project
Avia Av-52			Alternate designation for the LE P-3.4
Avia Av-136			Development of Av-36 with Walter Minor 4-III engine
Avia Av-145			Two-seat trainer project
Avia Av-146			Single engine utility/observation light aircraft project
Avia Av-236			Development of Av-36 with more powerful engines (e.g M-446)
Avia F.VIIb/3m	1930	2	Three-engine monoplane airliner; Fokker F.VIIb/3m built under license
Avia F.IX	1932	12	Three-engine monoplane bomber; Fokker F.IX built under license
Avia F.IX D	1932	2	Airliner version of F.IX
Avia LE P-3.4			1949 twin-seat jet trainer project
Avia S-92	1946	12	Twin-engine jet fighter; Messerschmitt Me 262A built under license
Avia S-99		21	Single-engine monoplane fighter, license built Bf 109G-6
Avia S-199	1947	559	S-99 with a Junkers Jumo 211F engine
Avia VR-1	1948	2	Single-engine helicopter; Focke-Achgelis Fa 223 built under license
Avia XLE-10	1950	1	Prototype single engine monoplane trainer

== See also ==
- Tatra (company)
- Škoda Auto
- List of aircraft engines § Avia Motors

Related lists

- List of aircraft manufacturers
- List of aircraft engine manufacturers
- List of automobile manufacturers
