= Avia 57 =

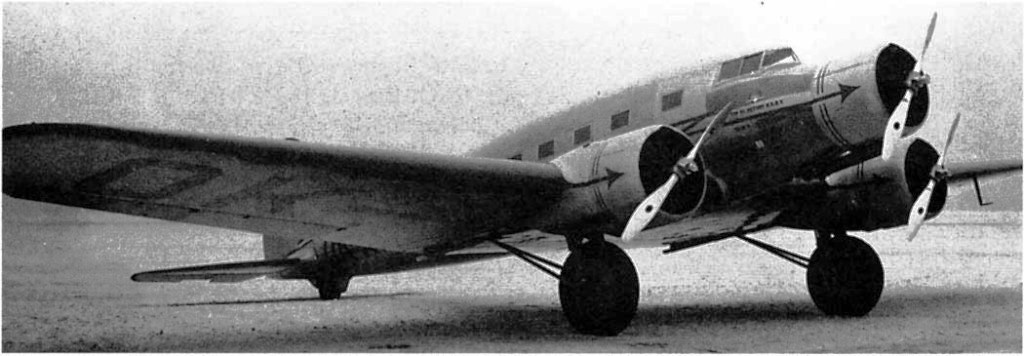

General information
- Type: 14-passenger commercial transport
- National origin: Czechoslovakia
- Manufacturer: Avia
- Designer: Robert Nebesář
- Number built: 1

History
- First flight: 16 January 1934

The Avia 57 was a 1930s Czechoslovak 14-passenger commercial transport, designed by Robert Nebesář and built by Avia. The type was not a success.

== Development ==
The Avia 57 was a three-engined low-wing monoplane that first flew in 1935. Powered by three Hispano-Suiza 9Vd radial engines, it had landing gear that retracted into the nacelles of the wing-mounted engines.

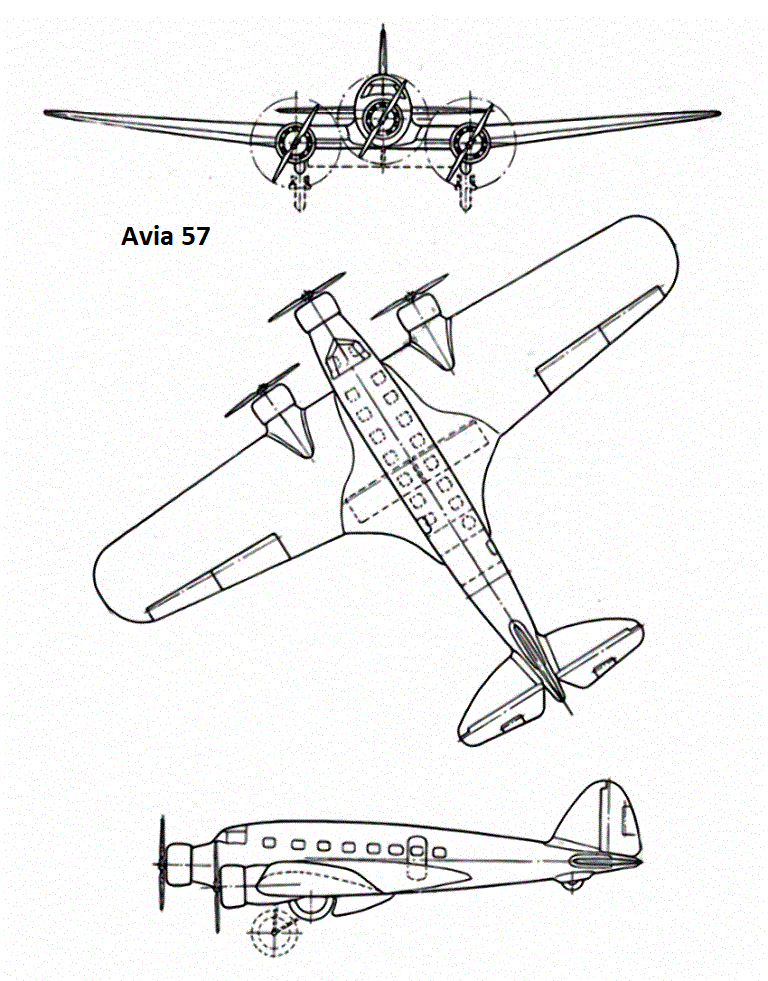
Orthographic line-drawing of the Avia 57

== Specifications ==
Data from

General characteristics

- Crew: two
- Capacity: 14
- Length: 15.90 m (52 ft 2 in)
- Wingspan: 22.50 m (73 ft 10 in)
- Wing area: 81.5 m^{2} (877 sq ft)
- Empty weight: 5,100 kg (11,244 lb)
- Gross weight: 8,600 kg (18,960 lb)
- Powerplant: 3 × Hispano-Suiza 9Vd radial piston engine, 429 kW (575 hp) each

Performance

- Maximum speed: 300 km/h (190 mph, 160 kn)
- Cruise speed: 270 km/h (170 mph, 150 kn)
- Range: 1,200 km (750 mi, 650 nmi)
- Service ceiling: 4,000 m (13,000 ft)
- Rate of climb: 5.5 m/s (1,080 ft/min)
