= Avia BH-7 =

Prototype Czechoslovak fighter aircraft

BH-7
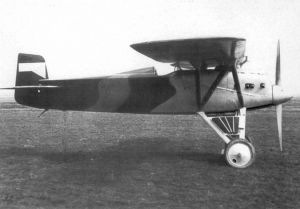

General information
- Type: Fighter
- Manufacturer: Avia
- Designer: Pavel Beneš and Miroslav Hajn
- Number built: 2

History
- First flight: 1923

The Avia BH-7 was a prototype fighter aircraft built in Czechoslovakia in 1923. It was a parasol-wing monoplane developed in tandem with, and as an alternative to the BH-6, which shared its fuselage and tail design. Like the BH-6, the BH-7 was involved in a number of serious crashes during its test programme, which led to its abandonment as a fighter. Undaunted, however, Avia used the design as the basis for a racing aircraft, shortening the wingspan by 1.4 m (4 ft 7 in), fairing the wing directly onto the top of the fuselage and dispensing with the cabane struts. This revised version was designated BH-7B and the fighter (retrospectively) as the BH-7A. When the design proved no more successful as a racer, it was finally put to rest.

== Specifications ==
General characteristics

- Crew: one pilot
- Length: 6.84 m (22 ft 5 in)
- Wingspan: 10.40 m (34 ft 1 in)
- Height: 2.83 m (9 ft 3 in)
- Wing area: 18.2 m^{2} (195 sq ft)
- Empty weight: 855 kg (1,885 lb)
- Gross weight: 1,150 kg (2,537 lb)
- Powerplant: 1 × Skoda licence-built Hispano-Suiza 8Fb Vee-8 , 310 kW (231 hp)

Performance

- Maximum speed: 240 km/h (149 mph, 129 kn)
- Range: 480 km (300 mi, 260 nmi)
- Service ceiling: 8,000 m (26,200 ft)
- Rate of climb: 6.7 m/s (1,312 ft/min)

Armament

- 2 × fixed, forward-firing .303 Vickers machine guns

== See also ==
Related development

- BH-6
