= Avia BH-1 =

Czechoslovak sports aircraft

BH-1
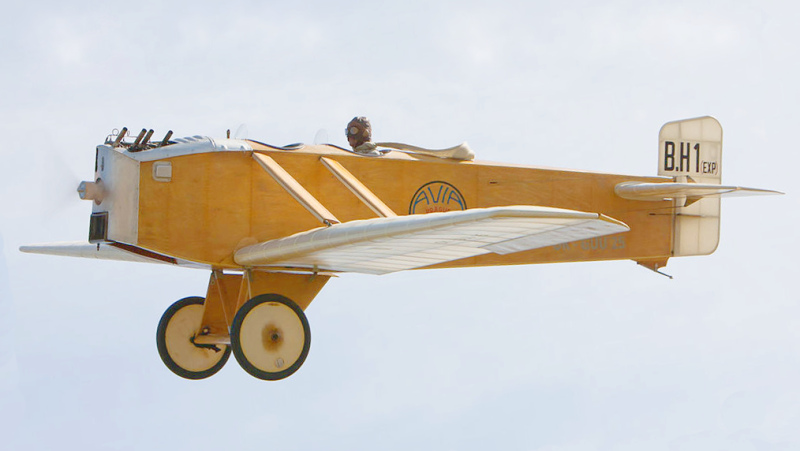
- An Avia BH-1 replica, OK-GUU25

General information
- Type: Sportsplane
- Manufacturer: Avia
- Designer: Pavel Beneš and Miroslav Hajn
- Number built: 1 + 1 airworthy replica

History
- First flight: 13 October 1920

The Avia BH-1 was a two-seat sports plane built in Czechoslovakia in 1920. It was the first product of the Avia company, and it was originally designated BH-1 exp. The BH-1 was a low-wing braced monoplane of wooden construction, with tailskid undercarriage. Power was provided by a Daimler engine, which proved inadequate to fly the aircraft with both seats occupied.

Soon after its first flight, it was exhibited at the inaugural International Aviation Exhibition in Prague. Its reception there was so enthusiastic that Czechoslovak president Tomáš Masaryk awarded Avia a 100,000 CSK development grant.

The BH-1 was subsequently rebuilt with a Gnome Omega rotary engine and was finally able to fly with two people aboard. It was known as the BH-1 bis in this configuration, and in 1921 won the Czechoslovak national cross-country rally with an average speed of 125 km/h (78 mph) over the 860 km (536 mi) course. The aircraft was damaged in a crash the following spring and was never repaired, having been surpassed by improved designs.

In 2004, Marcel Sezemský built a flying replica of the aircraft, powered by a Walter Mikron engine.

== Specifications (BH-1 exp) ==
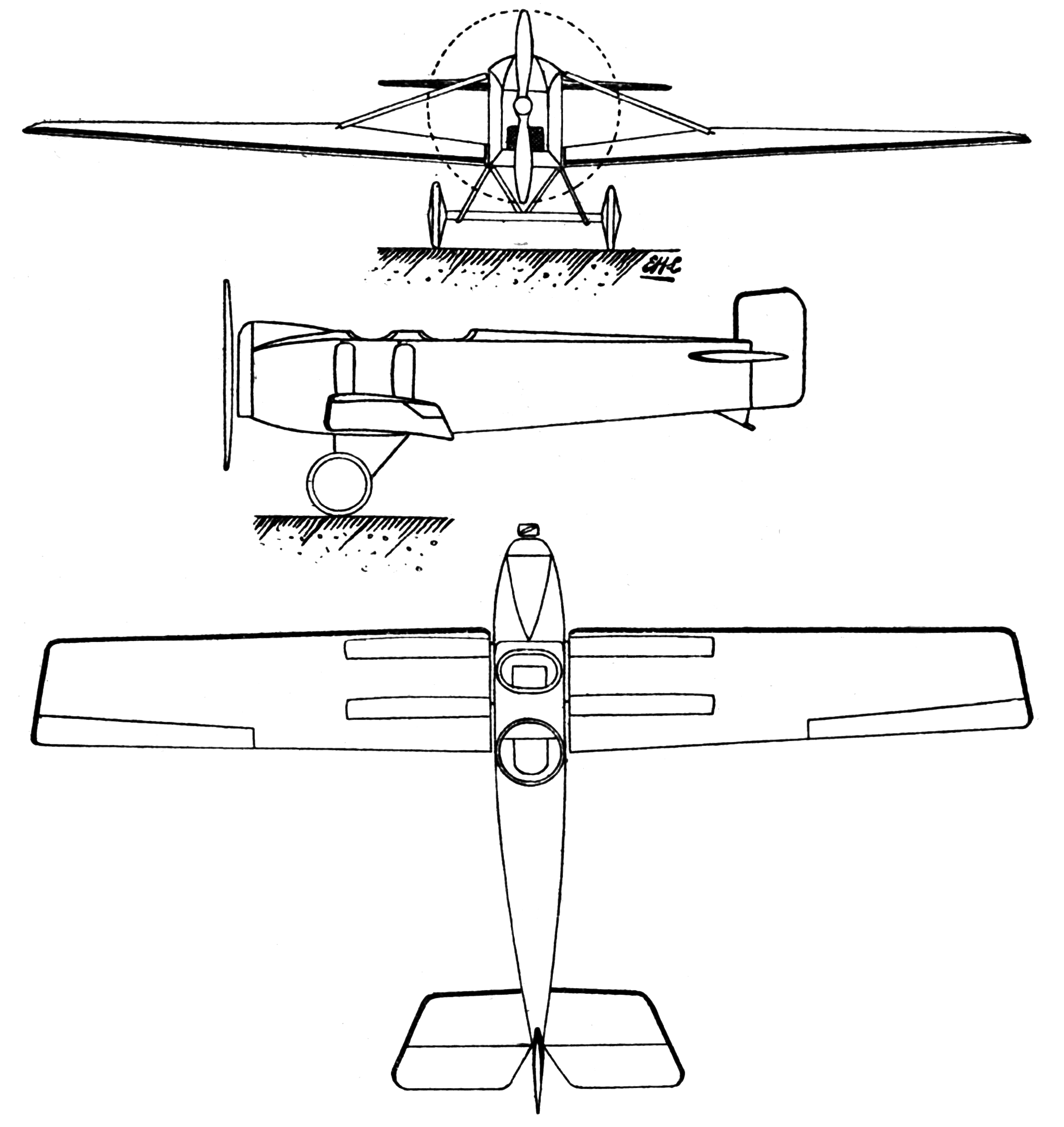
Avia BH-1 3-view drawing from Les Ailes October 13, 1921

General characteristics

- Crew: one pilot
- Capacity: one passenger intended
- Length: 5.7 m (18 ft 8 in)
- Wingspan: 10.08 m (33 ft 1 in)
- Wing area: 10.4 m^{2} (112 sq ft)
- Empty weight: 270 kg (595 lb)
- Gross weight: 490 kg (1,080 lb)
- Powerplant: 1 × Austro Daimler inline 4 engine, liquid cooled , 26–29 kW (35–40 hp)

Performance

- Maximum speed: 137 km/h (85 mph, 74 kn)
- Service ceiling: 3,500 m (11,483 ft)
