= Pavel Beneš =

Czech aircraft engineer (1894–1956)

Pavel Beneš (14 June 1894 in Prague – 31 May 1956 in Prague) was a chief designer at ČKD-Praga, one of the largest engineering companies in the former Czechoslovakia and today's Czech Republic.

Beneš was first a founder and chief designer at Avia, along with Miroslav Hajn, in 1919. The two began repairing planes in a workshop within the complex of an old sugar factory in Prague. One year later, they designed their first two-seater plane, the Avia BH-1. From 1923 to 1925, the two developed the BH-7, BH-9, and BH-11 monoplanes, launching the era of biplane fighters. The BH-11 won the Coppa d' Italia prize. Three years later, their BH-21 fighter was considered one of the world's best planes.

In 1930, Beneš and Hajn came to ČKD-Praga. The first aircraft they designed was the Praga E-39 in 1931.

In April 1935, he joined Jaroslav Mráz to form the Beneš-Mráz aircraft factory in Choceň.
