= Miroslav Hajn =

Czech aircraft engineer

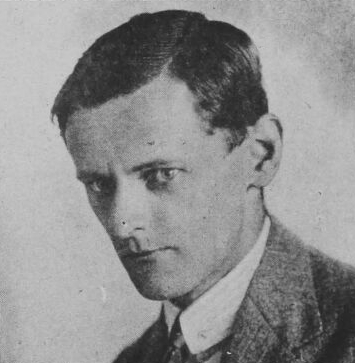
- Miroslav Hajn (konstruktér)
- Born: 21 September 1894; Žamberk
- Died: 6 September 1963 (aged 68); Prague
- Occupation: Aerospace engineer, inventor, university teacher
- Employer: Czech Technical University in Prague; ČKD-Praga

Miroslav Hajn (21 September 1894 in Žamberk, Austria-Hungary – 6 September 1963 in Prague, Czechoslovakia) was a chief designer at ČKD-Praga, one of the largest engineering companies in the former Czechoslovakia and today's Czech Republic.

Hajn was first a founder and chief designer at Avia, along with Pavel Beneš, in 1919. The two began repairing planes in a workshop within the complex of an old sugar factory in Prague. One year later, they designed their first two-seater plane, the Avia BH-1. From 1923 to 1925, the two developed the Avia BH-7, BH-9, and BH-11 monoplanes, launching the era of biplane fighters. The BH-11 won the Coppa d' Italia prize. Three years later, their Avia BH-21 fighter was considered one of the world's best planes.

In 1930, Hajn and Beneš came to ČKD-Praga. The first aircraft they designed was the Praga E-39 in 1931.
