= Rally Poland =

Motorsport event for rally cars

Rally Poland Rajd Polski
- Status: active
- Genre: motorsporting event
- Frequency: annual
- Country: Poland
- Inaugurated: 1921
- Website: rajdpolski.pl

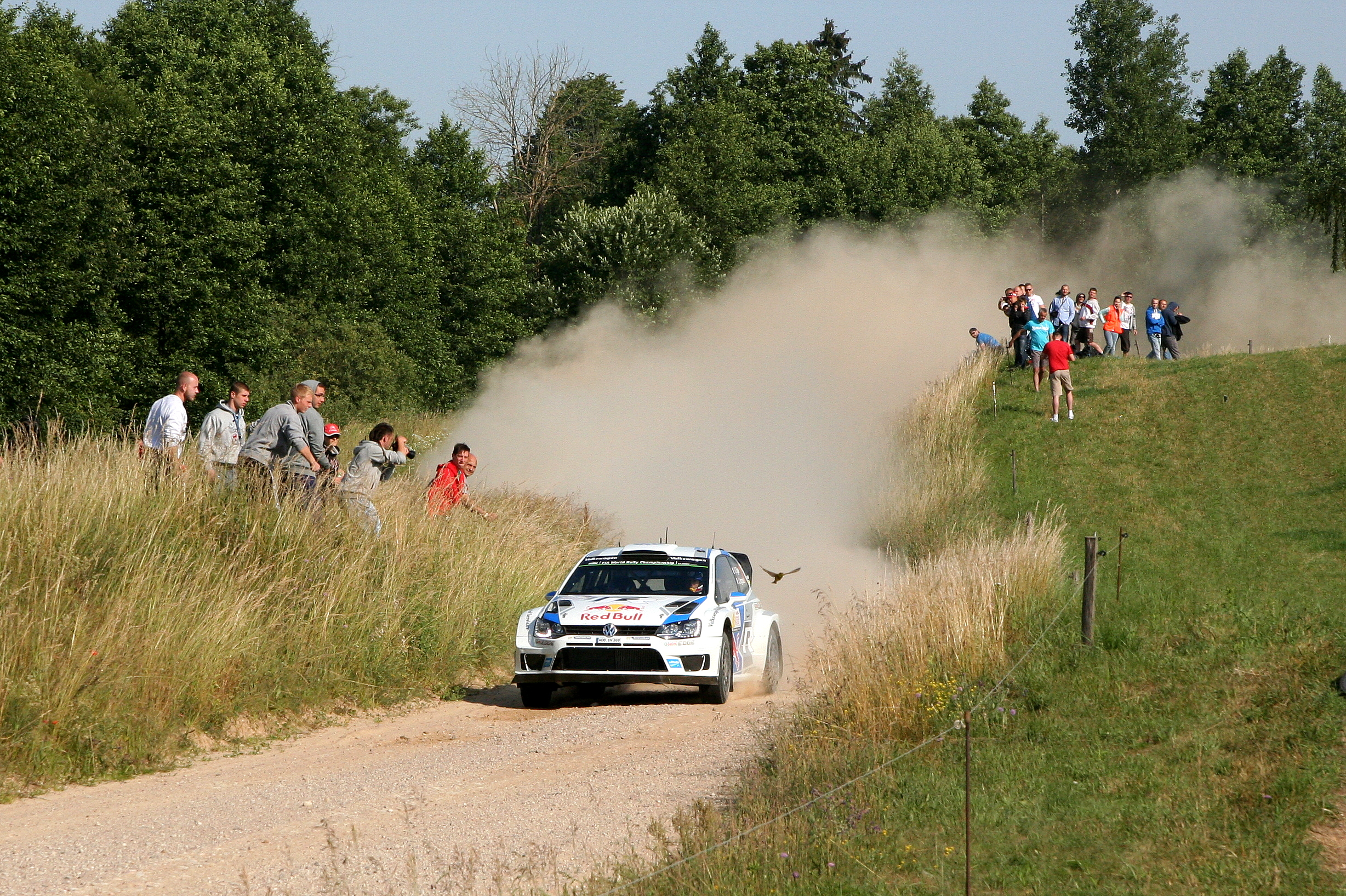
Rally Poland 2014 - Sébastien Ogier/Volkswagen Polo R WRC

The Rally of Poland (in Polish, Rajd Polski) is a motorsport event for rally cars that was first established in 1921. It is the second-oldest rally in the world that continues to this day, preceded only by the Monte Carlo Rally. The event became a permanent fixture of the European Rally Championship in 1960, except for a few editions held as part of the World Rally Championship.

In 1973, the Rally of Poland was one of the thirteen rounds of newly established World Rally Championship, but was removed from the 1974 calendar. After a move to Mikołajki in the Masurian Lake District in 2005, event organisers started lobbying for the event's inclusion as a round of the World Rally Championship. After being run as a candidate event in 2007 and 2008, Poland returned to the World Rally Championship in 2009, which was won by Mikko Hirvonen. However, the event was once again removed from the WRC after a single season, and was replaced by Rally Bulgaria.

During the 2012 season, the FIA put forward a tender for new events, and after a delay of one year, considered events in Brazil, China, India, Russia, South Africa and Poland for inclusion on the 2014 season calendar. The Rally of Poland was the successful candidate, and returned to the championship in 2014. The proposed route featured stages in nearby Lithuania, in a format similar to the Rally of Sweden, which crosses over the border into Norway. It was removed from the calendar after the 2017 season after the FIA repeatedly raised concerns about the event's safety.

== Rally winners ==
Year	Driver	Car	
1921	(Poland) Tadeusz Heyne	Dodge	
1922	(Austria) Hans Lorenz	Steyr	
1923	(Poland) Henryk Liefeld	Austro-Daimler	
1923	(Czechoslovakia) Jan Siroucek	Praga Grand	
1924	(Poland) Henryk Liefeld	Austro-Daimler	
1925	(Austria) Charles Betague	Austro-Daimler	
1927	(Poland) Stanisław Szwarcsztajn	Austro-Daimler	
1928	(Italy) Cipriano Illiano	Fiat 509	
1929	(Poland) Adam hr. Potocki	Austro-Daimler	g.D
1929	(Czechoslovakia) Josef Vermirovsky	Tatra	g.F
1929	(Czechoslovakia) Teodor Kredl	Praga Piccolo	g.G
1929	(Poland) Jan Ripper	Tatra	g.E
1929	(Czechoslovakia) Jaroslav Heusler	Praga Grand	g.C
1929	(Poland) Aachim baron Haebler	Maybach	g.B
1930	(Poland) Michał Bitny-Szlachta	Ford	g.A
1930	(Poland) Zygmunt Rahnenfeld	Fiat 525	g.B
1930	(Poland) Adam hr. Potocki	Austro-Daimler	g.C
1937	(Germany) Paul von Guillaeume	Adler Trumpf	g.II
1937	(Germany) Aleksander Mazurek	Chevrolet Master Sedan	g.V
1937	(Poland) Wojciech Kołaczkowski	DKW Meisterklasse	g.I
1938	(Poland) Jan Ripper	Fiat 1100 (1937)	g.I
1938	(Poland) Stanisław Szwarcsztajn	Lancia Aprilia	g.II
1938	(Germany) Hans Rauch	Mercedes-Benz 230	g.IV
1938	(Poland) Witold Rychter	Chevrolet Master Sedan	g.V
1938	(Poland) Jerzy Strenger	Citroën Légère	g.III
1939	(Poland) Tadeusz Marek	Chevrolet Master Sedan	g.IV
1939	(Poland) Stefan Grossman	Citroën	g.II
1939	(Poland) Stefan Pronaszko	Renault Primaquatre	g.III
1939	(Italy) Renato Ghisalba	Fiat 1100 (1937)	g.I
1947	(Poland) Marian Wierzba	Lancia Super Sport	g.III
1947	(Poland) Witold Rychter	Chevrolet Master Sedan	g.V
1947	(Poland) Zygmunt Andrzejewski	Willys	g.IV
1947	(Poland) Edward Loth	KdF	g.II
1947	(Poland) Alfred Pecko	DKW	g.I
1948	(Czechoslovakia) Ivan Hodac	Aero-Minor	g.I
1948	(Czechoslovakia) Vaclav Bobek	Škoda 1101	g.II
1948	(Poland) Julian Łączyński	Lancia	g.III
1948	(Czechoslovakia) A. Anton	BMW	g.IV
1948	(Czechoslovakia) Jiri Pohl	Jaguar	g.V
1948	(Poland) Józef Sucharda	Jaguar	g.VI
1954	(Poland) Alfons Zielkowski	DKW	750 T
1954	(Poland) Zbigniew Witkowski	Fiat 1100	1300 T
1954	(Poland) Edward Niziołek	Opel Olympia	1600 T
1954	(Poland) Zygmunt Skoczkowski	Tatraplan	2000 T
1954	(Poland) Stanisław Gustaw	FSO Warszawa M-20	2600 T
1954	(Poland) Bolesław Majkowski	1946 Ford V8	2600+T
1954	(Poland) Stanisław Rusiniak	BMW	1600 S
1954	(Poland) Franciszek Postawka	BMW 328	1600+
1955	(Poland) Edward Niziołek	Opel Olympia	g.VI
1955	(Poland) Bolesław Majkowski	Ford de Luxe	g.IX
1955	(Poland) Marian Repeta	FSO Warszawa M-20	g.VIII
1955	(Poland) Henryk Olszewski	Škoda	g.IV-V
1955	(Poland) Jerzy Zaczeniuk	Citroën	g.VII
1955	(Poland) Jacek Dzięciołowski	DKW	g.III
1955	(Poland) Grzegorz Timoszek	BMW 328	g.Sport
1956	(Poland) Marian Repeta	FSO Warszawa M-20	g.VIII
1956	(Poland) Jerzy Opiela	DKW	g.III
1956	(Poland) Edward Niziołek	Citroën BL 11	g.VII
1956	(Poland) Janusz Solarski	Škoda 1100	g.IV-V
1956	(Poland) Kazimierz Tarczyński	BMW	g.VI-S
1956	(Poland) Jan Jagielski	Opel Olympia	g.VI
1957	(Poland) Adam Wędrychowski	Zwickau P-70	g.III-T
1957	(Socialist Federal Republic of Yugoslavia) Mlado Vukovic	DKW	g.IV-T
1957	(Socialist Federal Republic of Yugoslavia) S. Vidmar	Porsche 356 1300 S	g.V-S
1957	(Poland) Walerian Waryszewski	BMW 328	g.VII-S
1957	(Poland) Mieczysław Sochacki	FSO Warszawa M-20	g.VIII-T
1957	(Poland) Marek Varisella	DKW F8	g.III-S
1957	(Poland) Bolesław Majkowski	Simca 8	g.V-T
1957	(Poland) Władysław Paszkowski	Opel Olympia	g.VII-T
1959	(East Germany) Kurt Rüdiger	Wartburg	g.IV
1959	(Poland) Krzysztof Komornicki	Simca Aronde	g.V
1959	(Poland) Henryk Ruciński	Ford Zephyr	g.VIII
1959	(Poland) Stanisław Wierzba	FSO Syrena	g.III
1959	(Poland) Andrzej Żymirski	Opel Olympia	g.VII
1960	(West Germany) Walter Schock	Mercedes-Benz 220SE	
1961	(West Germany) Eugen Böhringer	Mercedes-Benz 220SE	
1962	(West Germany) Eugen Böhringer	Mercedes-Benz 220SE	
1963	(West Germany) Dieter Glemser	Mercedes-Benz 220SE	
1964	(Poland) Sobiesław Zasada	Steyr-Puch 650TR	
1965	(Finland) Rauno Aaltonen	BMC Mini Cooper S	
1966	(United Kingdom) Tony Fall	BMC Mini Cooper	
1967	(Poland) Sobiesław Zasada	Porsche 912	
1968	(Poland) Krzysztof Komornicki	Renault R8 Gordini	
1969	(Poland) Sobiesław Zasada	Porsche 911S	
1970	(France) Jean-Claude Andruet	Alpine-Renault A110 1600	
1971	(Poland) Sobiesław Zasada	BMW 2002 tii	
1972	(Italy) Raffaele Pinto	Fiat 124 Spider Rally	
1973†	(West Germany) Achim Warmbold	Fiat 124 Abarth Rally	
1974	(Austria) Klaus Russling	Porsche 911 Carrera RS	
1975	(Italy) Maurizio Verini	Fiat 124 Abarth	
1976	(Poland) Andrzej Jaroszewicz	Lancia Stratos HF	
1977	(France) Bernard Darniche	Lancia Stratos HF	
1978	(Belgium) Gilbert Staepelaere	Ford Escort RS1800	
1979	(Spain) Antonio Zanini	Fiat 131 Abarth	
1980	(Spain) Antonio Zanini	Porsche 911	
1984	(Sweden) Ingvar Carlsson	Mazda RX-7	
1985	(Socialist Federal Republic of Yugoslavia) Branislav Kuzmic	Renault 5T	
1986	(Socialist Federal Republic of Yugoslavia) Branislav Kuzmic	Renault 5T	
1987	(Hungary) Attila Ferjancz	Audi Coupé Quattro	
1988	(Belgium) Marc Soulet	Ford Sierra RS Cosworth	
1989	(Belgium) Robert Droogmans	Ford Sierra RS Cosworth	
1990	(Belgium) Robert Droogmans	Lancia Delta Integrale	
1991	(Italy) Piero Liatti	Lancia Delta Integrale	
1992	(Germany) Erwin Weber	Mitsubishi Galant VR-4	
1993	(Belgium) Robert Droogmans	Ford Escort Cosworth	
1994	(Belgium) Patrick Snijers	Ford Escort Cosworth	
1995	(Italy) Enrico Bertone	Toyota Celica T 4WD	
1996	(Poland) Krzysztof Hołowczyc	Toyota Celica T 4WD	
1997	(Belgium) Patrick Snijers	Ford Escort Cosworth WRC	
1998	(Poland) Krzysztof Hołowczyc	Subaru Impreza WRC	
1999	(Poland) Robert Gryczyński	Toyota Corolla WRC	
2000	(Denmark) Henrik Lundgaard	Toyota Corolla WRC	
2001	(Poland) Leszek Kuzaj	Toyota Corolla WRC	
2002	(Poland) Janusz Kulig	Ford Focus RS WRC	
2003	(Portugal) Miguel Campos	Peugeot 206 WRC	
2004	(Italy) Luca Pedersoli	Peugeot 306 Maxi Kit Car	
2005	(Poland) Krzysztof Hołowczyc	Subaru Impreza N11	
2006	(Poland) Leszek Kuzaj	Subaru Impreza N12	
2007	(Sweden) Oscar Svedlund	Subaru Impreza N12	
2008	(Poland) Michał Bębenek	Mitsubishi Lancer Evo IX	
2009†	(Finland) Mikko Hirvonen	Ford Focus RS WRC 09	
2010	(Poland) Kajetan Kajetanowicz	Subaru Impreza STR09	
2011	(Poland) Kajetan Kajetanowicz	Subaru Impreza STR09	
2012	(Finland) Esapekka Lappi	Škoda Fabia S2000	
2013	(Poland) Kajetan Kajetanowicz	Ford Fiesta R5	
2014†	(France) Sebastien Ogier	Volkswagen Polo R WRC	
2015†	(France) Sebastien Ogier	Volkswagen Polo R WRC	
2016†	(Norway) Andreas Mikkelsen	Volkswagen Polo R WRC	
2017†	(Belgium) Thierry Neuville	Hyundai i20 Coupe WRC	
2018	(Russia) Nikolay Gryazin	Škoda Fabia R5	
2019	(Russia) Alexey Lukyanuk	Citroën C3 R5	
2021	(Russia) Alexey Lukyanuk	Citroën C3 Rally2	
2022	(Poland) Mikołaj Marczyk	Škoda Fabia Rally2 evo	
2023	(Latvia) Mārtiņš Sesks	Škoda Fabia RS Rally2	
2024†	(Finland) Kalle Rovanperä	Toyota GR Yaris Rally1	
2025	(Latvia) Mārtiņš Sesks	Škoda Fabia RS Rally2	

† — Rally was part of the World Rally Championship.

=== Multiple winners ===
Wins	Driver
4	(Poland) Sobiesław Zasada
3	(Belgium) Robert Droogmans (Poland) Bolesław Majkowski (Poland) Edward Niziołek (Poland) Kajetan Kajetanowicz (Poland) Krzysztof Hołowczyc
2	(Belgium) Patrick Snijers (France) Sebastien Ogier (Germany) Eugen Böhringer (Russia) Alexey Lukyanuk
2	(Poland) Witold Rychter (Poland) Stanisław Szwarcsztajn (Poland) Adam hr. Potocki (Poland) Edward Niziołek (Poland) Henryk Liefeld-Jan Ripper
2	(Spain) Antonio Zanini (Socialist Federal Republic of Yugoslavia) Branislav Kuzmic (Latvia) Mārtiņš Sesks

Wins	Manufacturers
12	(United States) Ford
9	(Italy) Fiat
8	(Czech Republic) Škoda
7	(Germany) DKW (Germany) BMW
6	(Austria) Austro-Daimler (Italy) Lancia (Japan) Subaru (France) Citroën (Japan) Toyota
5	(Germany) Porsche (Germany) Opel (Germany) Mercedes (Poland) FSO
4	(France) Renault (United States) Chevrolet
3	(Czechoslovakia) Tatra (Germany) Volkswagen (United Kingdom) BMC
2	(France) Peugeot (Japan) Mitsubishi

== Mikolajki Arena ==
Every year a Super Special Stage called Mikolajki Arena takes place. 2 crews start at the same time in head-to-head battle. The track record was set on 2024 by Tänak / Järveoja.

Stage	Crew	Car	Time
2024 SS1	Tänak / Järveoja	Hyundai i20 N Rally1	1:42.5
2024 SS8	Katsuta / Johnston	Toyota GR Yaris Rally1	1:43.4
2024 SS8	Rovanperä / Halttunen	Toyota GR Yaris Rally1	1:43.4
