= Praga Bohema =

Sports car

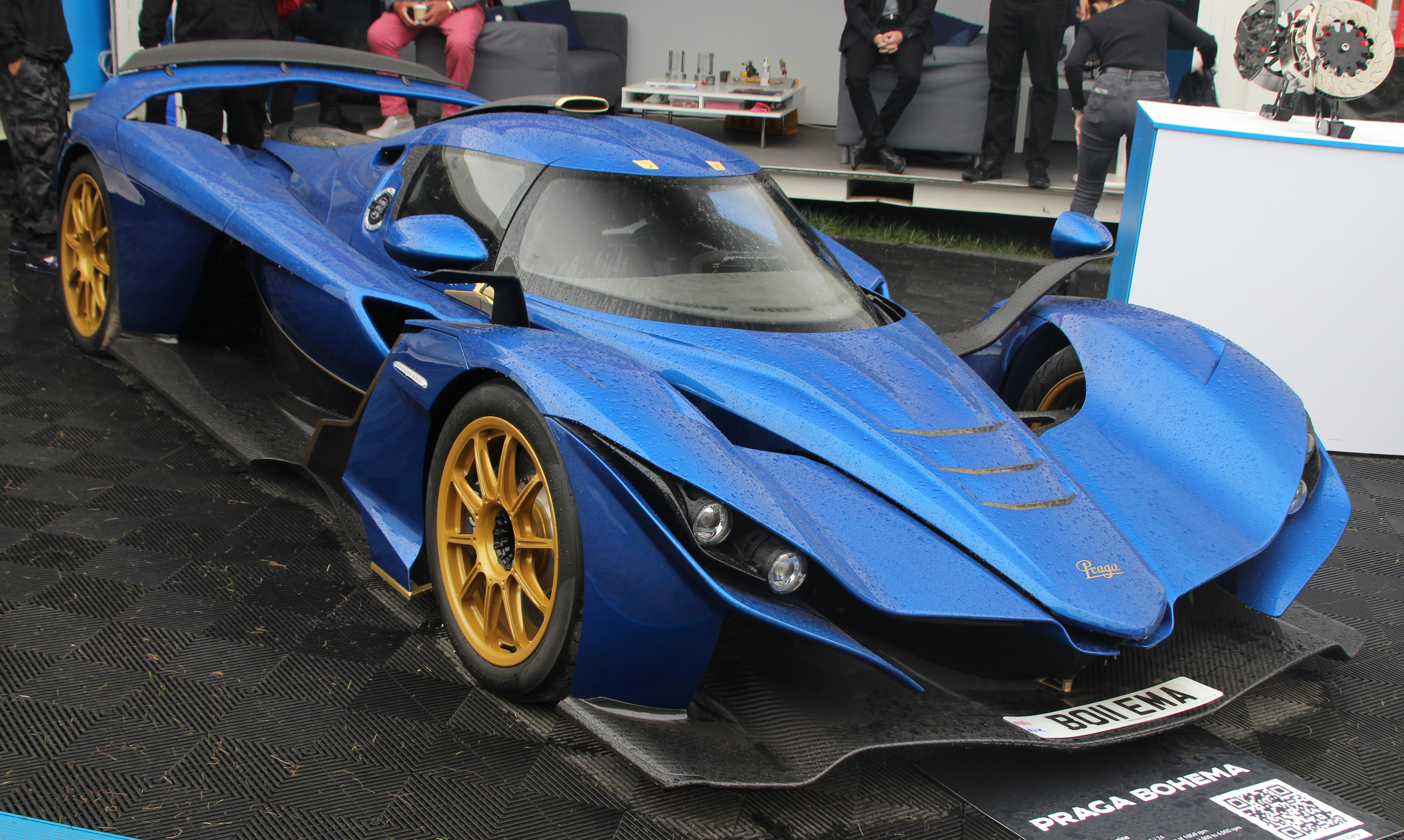

Overview
- Manufacturer: Praga
- Production: 2023–present (89 units to be produced)
- Model years: 2024–present
- Assembly: Slovakia; Orechová Potôň
- Designer: Juraj Mitro

Body and chassis
- Class: Sports car (S)
- Body style: 2-door coupé
- Layout: Rear mid-engine, rear-wheel-drive

Powertrain
- Engine: PL38DETT 3799 cc twin-turbocharged V6
- Transmission: Hewland 6-speed sequential manual transmission

Dimensions
- Wheelbase: 2,770 mm (108.9 in)
- Length: 4,510 mm (177.4 in)
- Width: 2,000 mm (78.9 in)
- Height: 1,060 mm (41.7 in)
- Kerb weight: 982 kg (2,165 lb)

The Praga Bohema is a limited-production sports car manufactured by Czech company Praga.

== Overview ==
The car was introduced in November 2022. Production began in the second half of 2023, when the first 10 cars were made. In the same year, the Czech brand opened a showroom in England. In the next four to five years, the company intended to produce around 20 cars. Production was intended to be 89 units to celebrate Praga's 89th anniversary since the Czech victory at the 1000 Miles of Czechoslovakia in 1933.

After delays and circumstances, the first unit was delivered to a Dutch buyer for €1.36 million plus taxes in December 2024.

=== Design ===
Although the Bohema is heavily oriented towards track performance, it maintains several features that somewhat preserve its usability as a road car, such as storage bins located at the rear wheel arches and Alcantara stitching in the interior. British firm Litchfield Motors made several modifications to the engine, which was originally featured in the Nissan GT-R. The VR38DETT's wet sump oil system has been replaced with a dry sump, the turbochargers have been replaced with Litchfield's own, bringing power and torque up to 710 PS (700 hp; 522 kW) at 6,800 rpm and 725 N⋅m (535 lb⋅ft) between 3,000 rpm and 6,000 rpm, and is paired to a titanium exhaust at the rear.

Power is sent through the rear wheels via a 6-speed Hewland sequential manual transmission, to tyres fitted with Pirelli Trofeo R (305/30 ZR19 102Y rear, 245/40 ZR18 97Y front). This arrangement allows for the interchangeability of road tyres with track-only Michelin slicks, which are the same size.

The mechanical grip is complemented by the radical exterior design that Praga claims will provide 900 kg (1,984 lb) of downforce at 250 km/h (155 mph). This is a similar ratio to the Bugatti Veyron. With such downforce, the car could theoretically drive upside down at this speed. Extensive use of carbon fibre throughout the car including its chassis gives it a kerb weight of just under 1,000 kg (2,205 lb).

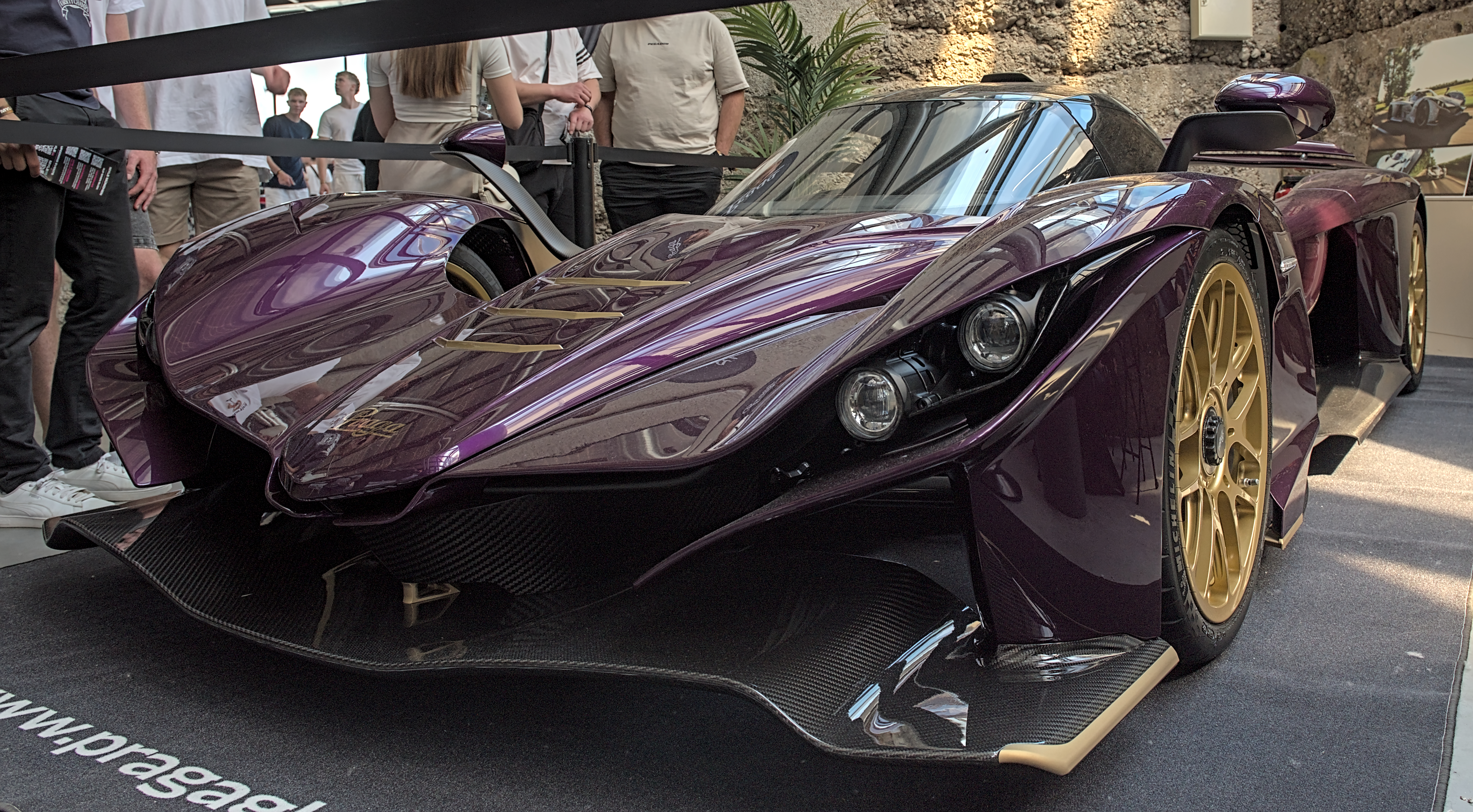
Praga Bohema

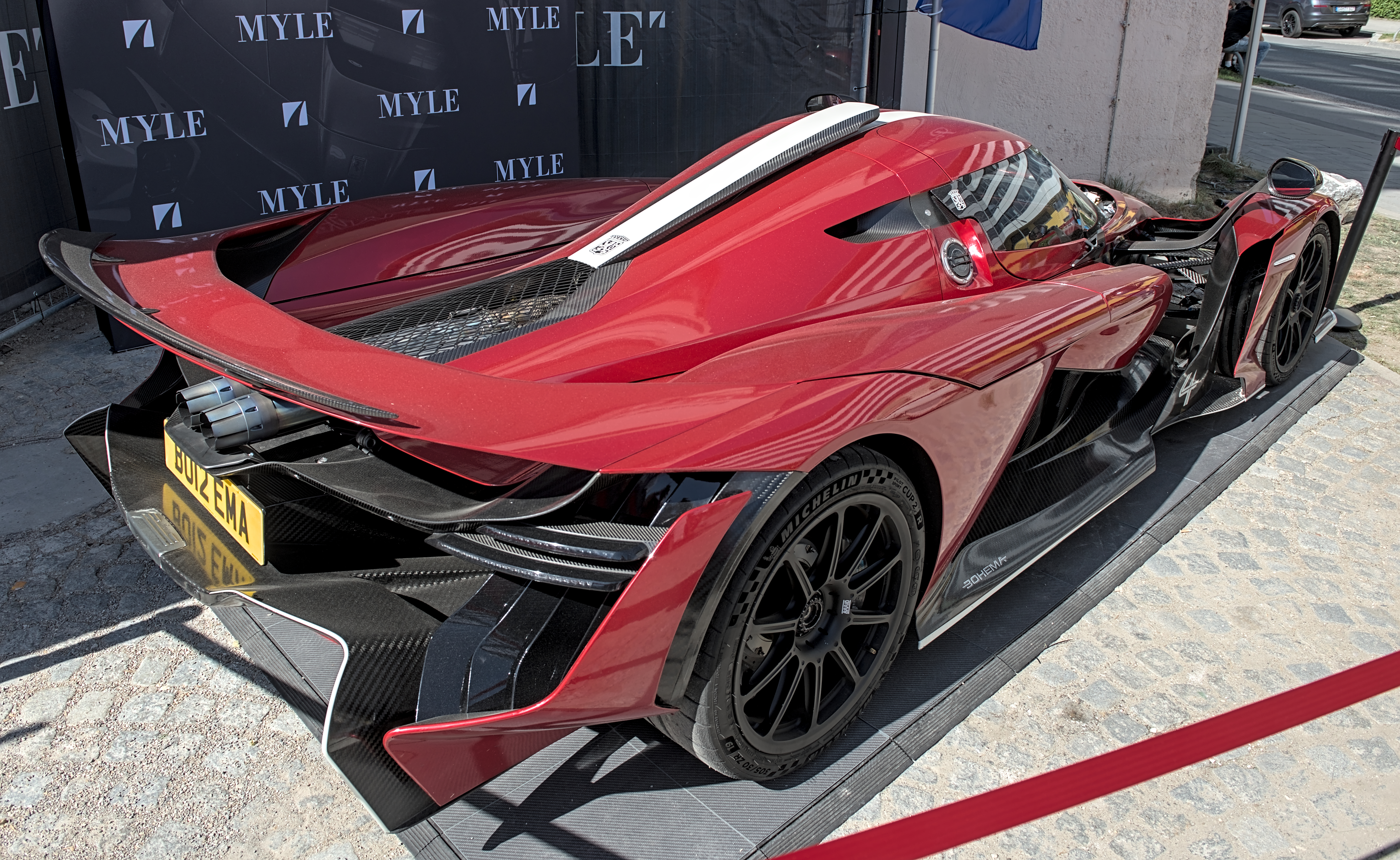
Rear view

== Specifications ==
Model	Engine	Displacement	Power	Torque	0–100 km/h (0–62 mph)	Top speed	Downforce
Litchfield Motors tuned Nissan VR38DETT	Twin-turbo V6, 24 valves	3,799 cc	700 hp (522 kW; 710 PS) at 6,800 rpm	725 N⋅m (535 lbf⋅ft) at 6,000 rpm	2.3 s	190 mph (305 km/h)	250 km/h: 900 kg
