= Praga Alfa =

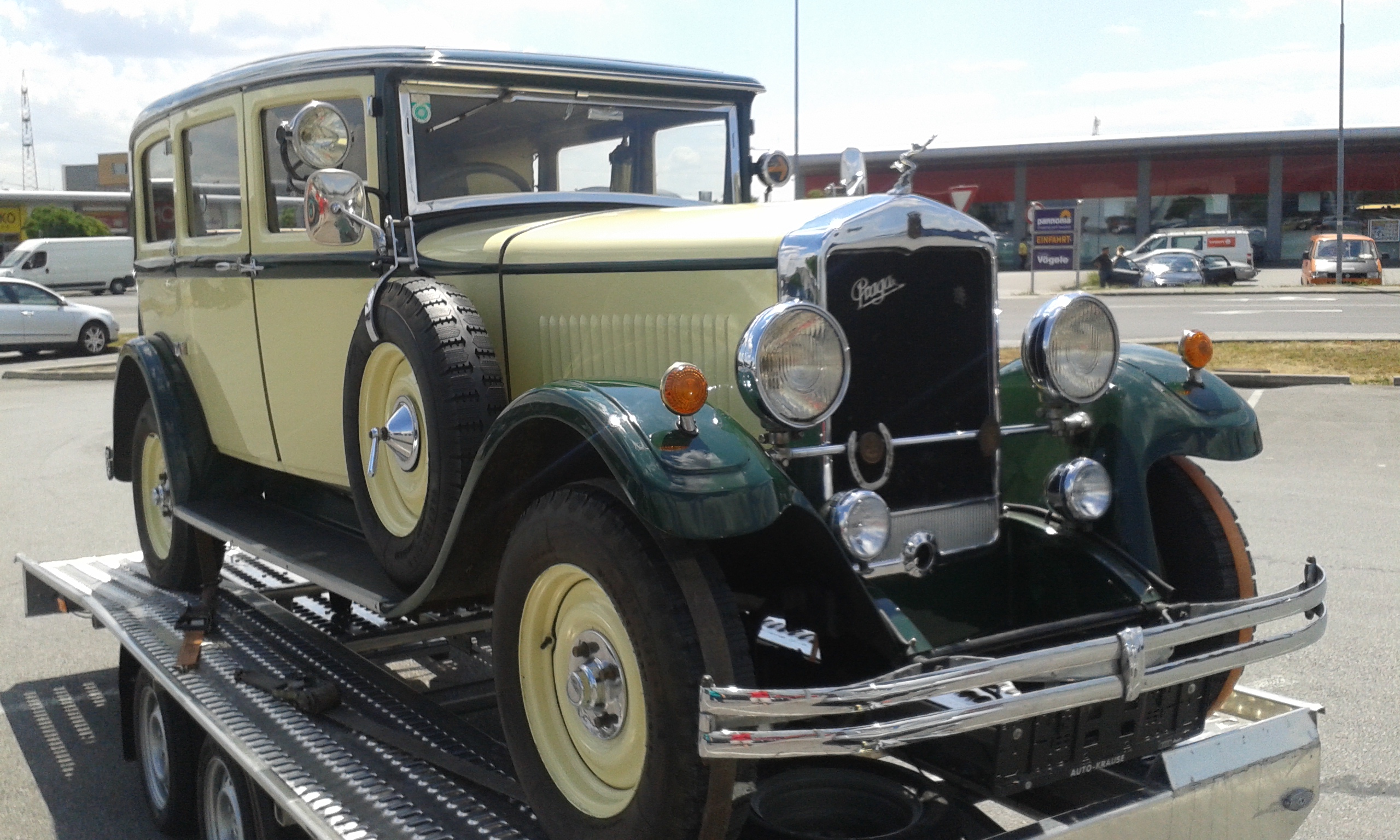
- Praga Alfa

Overview
- Manufacturer: Praga
- Production: 1913–1942

Body and chassis
- Body style: 4-door 6-seat limousine 4-door 4-seat phaeton 4-door 6-seat convertible 2-door 4-seater convertible 2 door 2-seat coupe

The Praga Alfa was the name used by Praga in Czechoslovakia for one of its principal car ranges. Production started in 1913 and finished in 1942.

== Overview ==
The Alfa was initially conceived as a cheaper and smaller complement to the Praga Grand and Mignon. The car was first produced in 1913 as a "people's car" for the mass market, combining affordability with reasonable levels of comfort and practicality. The design, developed under the leadership of Frantisek Kec, was traditional, combining a backbone frame with all-independent suspension and a side valve engine. Sales were successful, with all the vehicles produced in the first year sold within the year. Production was halted due to the mobilisation that led up to World War I but resumed in 1923. In September 1927, an Alfa with a larger 6 cylinder engine was introduced, followed by a completely new model in October 1937.

A total of 9257 vehicles were produced.

== Alfa 5/15HP ==
Praga Alfa 5/15HP
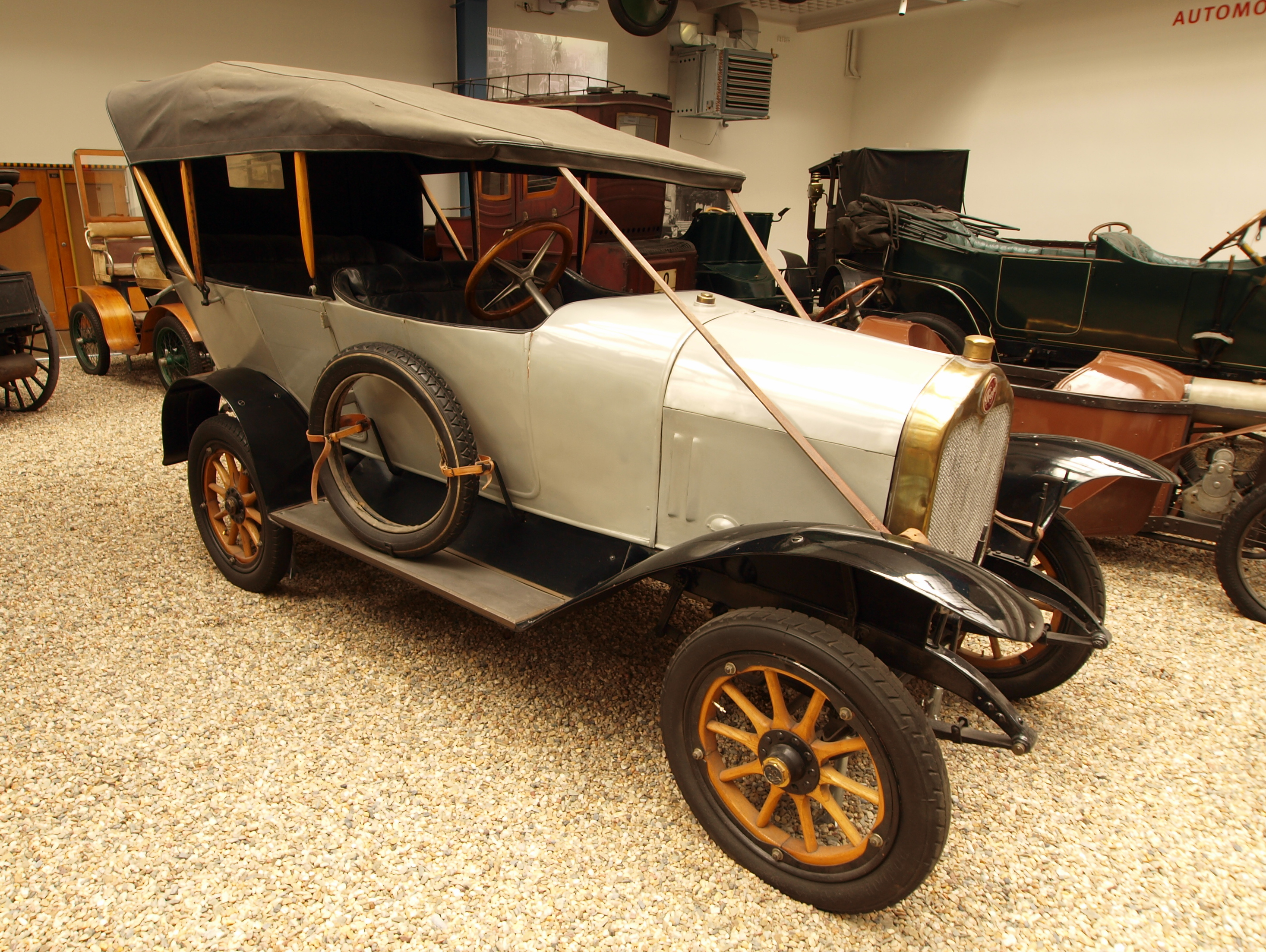
- 1913 Praga Alfa

Overview
- Also called: Praga Alfa
- Production: 1913
- Assembly: Prague, Czechoslovakia

Body and chassis
- Body style: 3-door phaeton
- Layout: FR layout

Powertrain
- Engine: 1,130 cc (69 in^{3}) I4
- Transmission: 4-speed manual

Dimensions
- Wheelbase: 2,650 mm (104 in)
- Length: 3,545 mm (139.6 in)
- Width: 1,400 mm (55 in)
- Curb weight: 750 kg (1,650 lb) (phaeton)

The first Alfa was launched in 1913. The design was traditional with a front-mounted engine driving the rear wheels through a four speed manual transmission. The wheelbase was 2,650 mm (104 in) and front and rear track were each 1,100 mm (43 in). Equipped with a 1,130 cc (69 in^{3}) inline-four engine, which weighed 758 kilograms (1,672 lb) and developed 11 kW (15 hp), the car was capable of a top speed of 56 km/h (35 mph). Fuel consumption was 10 L/100 km (23.5 mpg_{‑US}). The engine had a bore of 60 mm (2.4 in) and stroke 100 mm (3.9 in). Each cylinder had two side valves. A phaeton body was fitted with three doors and four seats, which was 3,545 mm (139.6 in) long and 1,400 mm (55 in) wide. The total weight of the vehicle was 750 kg (1,650 lb). Production lasted one year before mobilisation for the First World War halted activity on civilian cars.

After the war, Praga found itself in a new country, Czechoslovakia, and a new economic reality, with imports of critical components like tyres proving expensive. Although the company had survived the war, production focused on vehicles like plows and roadrollers rather than cars. Production of the Alfa resumed in 1923, with the design unchanged. The cost of a car at the factory gate was 50,000 CSK. The car was slightly improved in 1925, with the addition of brakes to the front wheels and a statuette of a runner holding a laurel wreath in outstretched arms mounted on a new nickel-plated radiator.

== Alfa 8/25HP ==
Praga Alfa 8/25HP
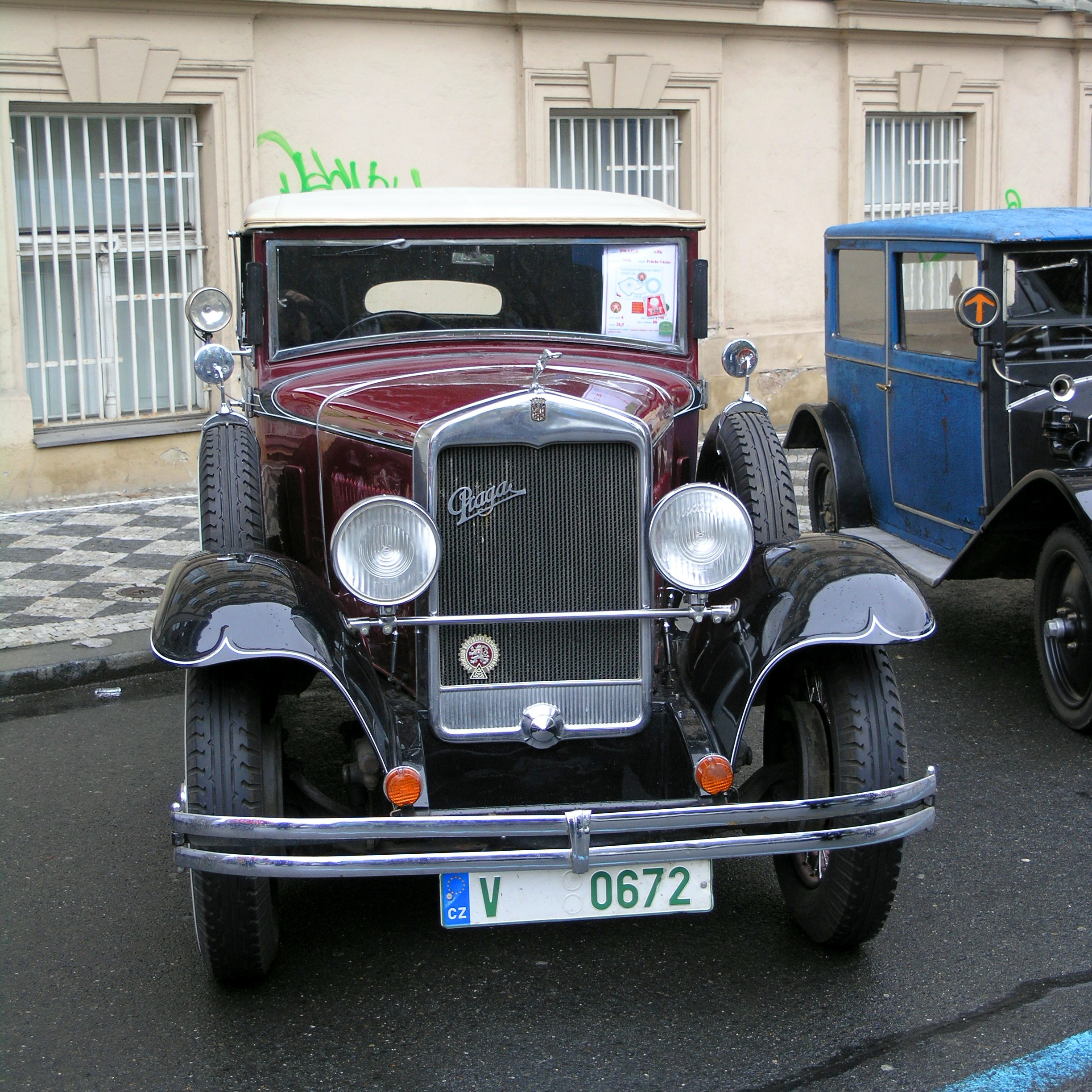
- 1931 Praga Alfa

Overview
- Also called: Praga Alfa 6
- Production: 1927-1937
- Assembly: Prague, Czechoslovakia

Body and chassis
- Body style: 4-door phaeton; 4 door sedan
- Layout: FR layout

Powertrain
- Engine: 1,496 cc (91.3 in^{3}) I6
- Transmission: 4-speed manual

Dimensions
- Wheelbase: 2,900 mm (110 in)
- Length: 4,100 mm (160 in)
- Width: 1,530 mm (60 in)
- Height: 1,700 mm (67 in) (sedan)
- Curb weight: 1,150 kg (2,540 lb) (phaeton); 1,250 kg (2,760 lb) (sedan)

1927 saw the first radical redesign of the Alfa. The new car was a "small six", a car for the popular market powered by a 6-cylinder engine. Introduced in September 1927, the Alfa 8/25HP was a more powerful development of the pre-war Alfa. The car introduced a 25 kW (34 hp) water-cooled 6-cylinder engine with a removable head incorporating Ricardo combustion units. It was the smallest 6-cylinder engine produced in Czechoslovakia at the time. It had rigid axles, drum brakes and a front-mounted 40 litres (11 US gal) fuel tank. Top speed was 80 km/h (50 mph) and fuel consumption was 11 L/100 km (26 mpg_{‑imp}). The wheelbase was extended to 2,900 mm (110 in) and a new four door phaeton body was introduced which was 4,100 mm (160 in) long and 1,530 mm (60 in) wide, and weighed 1,150 kg (2,540 lb). A closed sedan was added with six windows which was 1,700 mm (67 in) high and weighed 1,250 kg (2,760 lb). Cost of the car was 64,000 CSK. 2500 cars were produced between 1927 and 1929.

In 1929, an uprated version was introduced with a 1,795 cc (109.5 in^{3}) engine rated at 27 kW (36 hp). This was increased further to 28 kW (38 hp) in 1932. Top speed increased to 90 km/h (56 mph) and fuel consumption increased to 14 L/100 km (20 mpg_{‑imp})
