= Praga R1R =

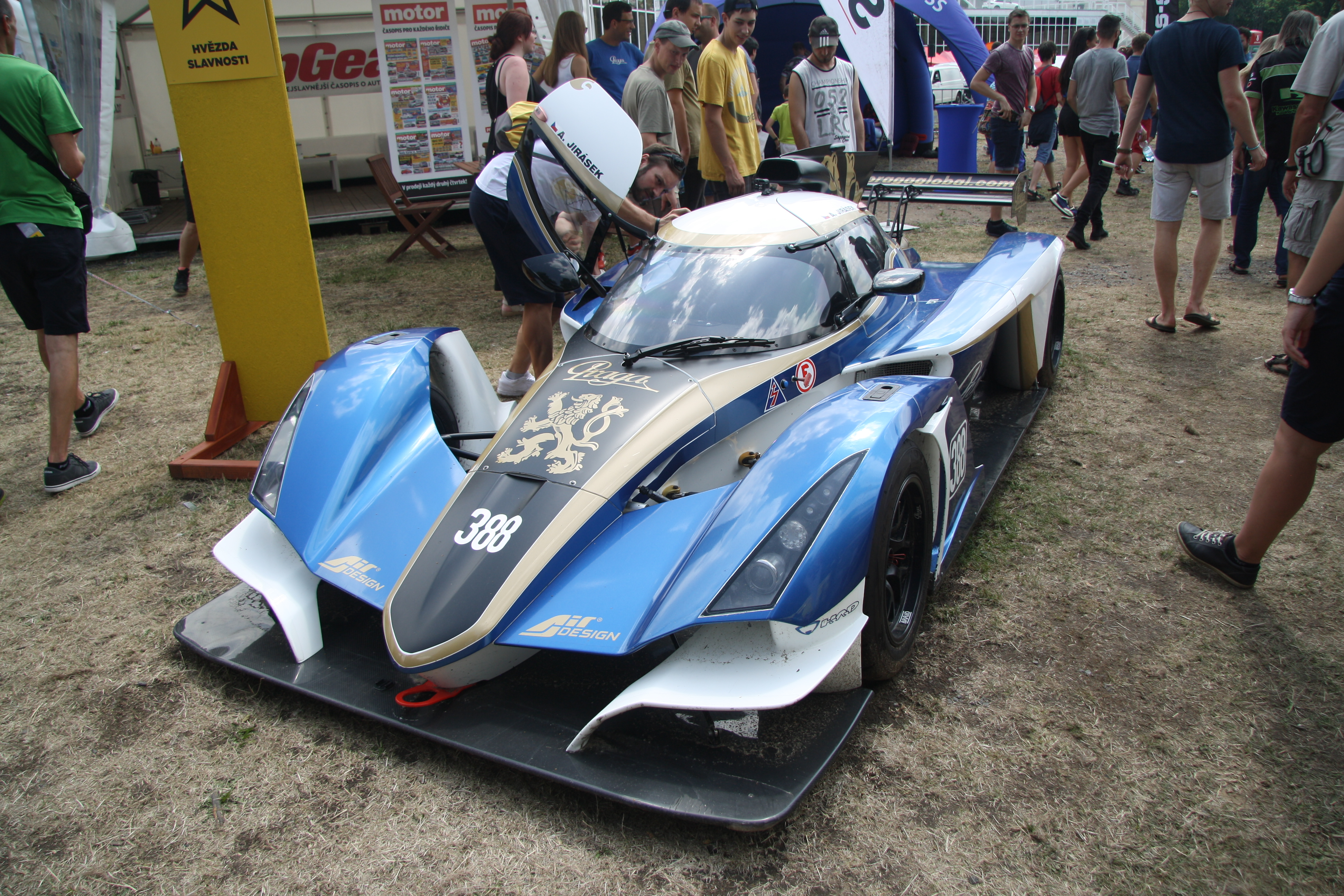

Overview
- Manufacturer: Praga
- Also called: Praga R1 Road Car
- Production: 2015–present
- Assembly: Orechová Potôň, Slovakia
- Designer: Juraj Mitro

Body and chassis
- Class: Sports car (S)
- Body style: 2-door coupe
- Layout: MR layout
- Platform: Praga R1
- Doors: Butterfly
- Related: Praga R1

Powertrain
- Engine: 2.0 L Renault F4R turbocharged Inline-4
- Transmission: 6-speed Hewland JFR sequential semi-automatic transaxle

Dimensions
- Wheelbase: 2,525 mm (99 in)
- Length: 4,124 mm (162 in)
- Width: 1,800 mm (71 in)
- Height: 965 mm (38 in)
- Curb weight: 670 kg (1,477 lb) (dry)

The Praga R1R is a mid-engined sports car produced by Praga. The R1R represents the first road car made by Praga in 68 years. Because of the 68-year long term hiatus, Praga decided to only make 68 units of the car.

The car is based on the Praga R1, a race car by Praga that races in the Dutch Supercar Challenge and Britcar sports car racing.

== Specifications ==
The car is powered by a Renault Sport-sourced 2.0-liter F4R turbocharged inline-four, which produces 330 to 390 hp (246 to 291 kW; 335 to 395 PS), the power being dependent on the customer's setup. The power is delivered to the rear wheels by a Hewland-built 6-speed semi-automatic transmission, and also making the R1R rear-wheel drive. The transmission also uses a centrifugal clutch.

The car has a tendency to backfire constantly when making up-shifts and downshifts.

The car has a 670 kg (1,477 lb) measurement in curb weight, making the car extremely lightweight, thanks to the use of carbon fiber. The body also features a subframe back at the rear for the engine.

The R1R also uses inboard suspension both front and rear, which also features inboard pushrod-operated Koni dampers.

The car is able to create more downforce than its own curb weight.

== Design ==
The overall design of the car is very similar to the R1 race car. Notable differences are that the headlights and tail lights form two bulbs instead of a longer straightened variant, the rear wing shape is smaller and is placed in a different position, and the top air tunnel is shaped differently. The R1R is 2 mm (0.079 in) smaller in wheelbase, and 20 mm (0.79 in) smaller in length than that the race car.

The interior is also similar to the R1. The seats have been changed to conform to road regulations and to give the driver (and passenger, if in a two-seat configuration) more comfort.

== Reception ==
Evo tested the R1R on August 15, 2016, with Jethro Bovingdon and gave the car a 4/5 rating. According to Evo, the 2.0-liter Renault Sport engine has big character, the R1R has massive downforce, and is very capable on the track. One downside they gave it, however, is that because of how the car is based on a race car and how it is similar to it, it doesn't make the car good for the road, and the seating positions, whether it is single-seat or two-seat, are difficult.

Jon Olsson, a professional freeskier and alpine ski racer, gave the car a 9/10 rating on his vlog with the R1R where he laps the car in Ascari Race Resort. In another vlog, where he drives the car 1,800 km (1,118 mi) from Monaco to Marbella, Spain, he mentioned the car was absolutely incredible, and is best driven if the driver is a person who loves the driving experience, and the drawback being that the car is not for everyone.
