= Praga Super Piccolo =

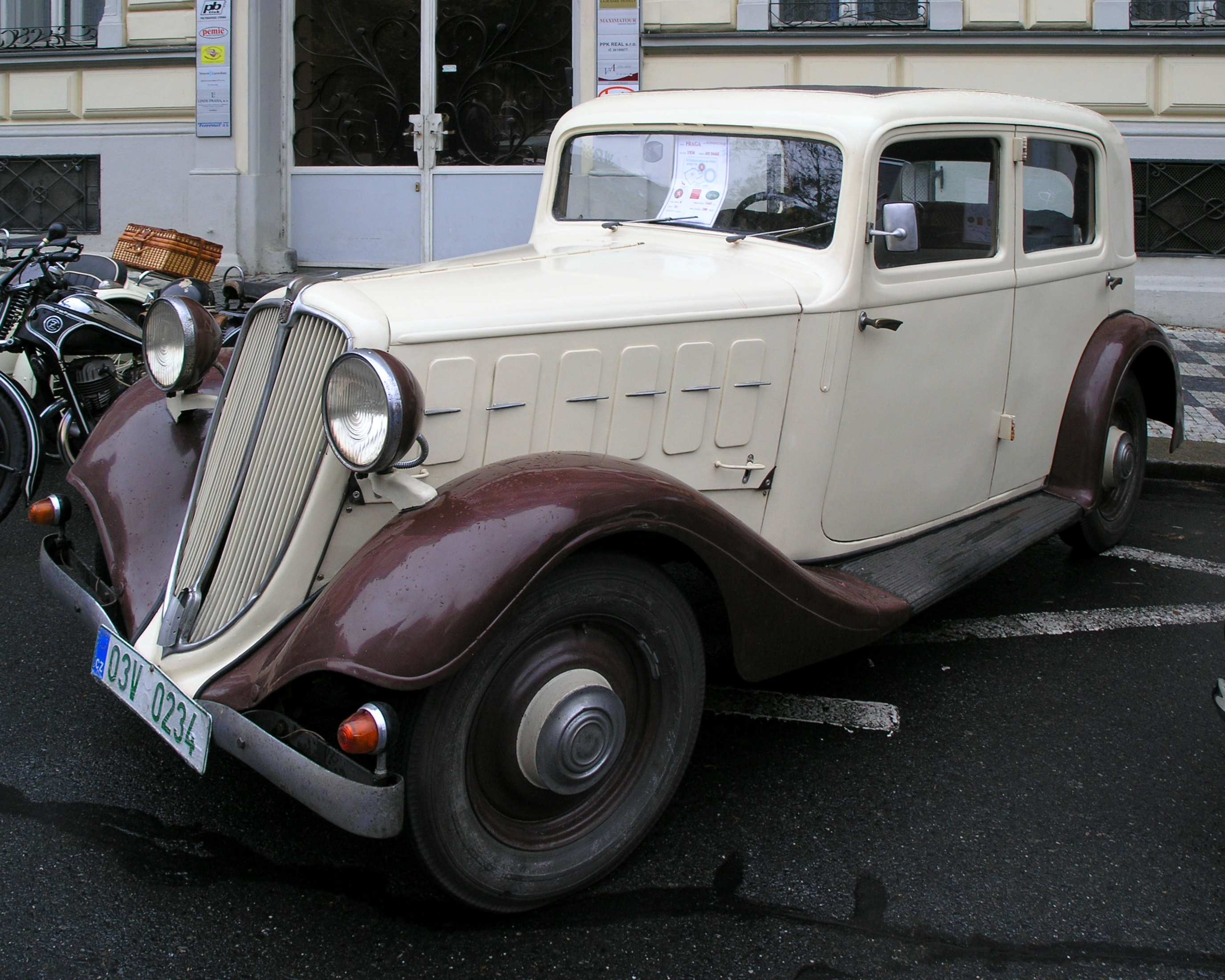
- 1934 Praga Super Piccolo

Overview
- Manufacturer: Praga
- Production: 1934 – 1936
- Assembly: Prague, Czechoslovakia

Body and chassis
- Body style: Sedan, roadster
- Layout: Front-engine, rear-wheel drive

Powertrain
- Engine: 1,660 cc (101 in^{3}) I4
- Transmission: 4 speed manual

Dimensions
- Wheelbase: 2,700 mm (106 in)
- Length: 4,450 mm (175 in) (sedan); 4,650 mm (183 in) (aerodynamic sedan)
- Width: 1,570 mm (62 in) (sedan); 1,750 mm (69 in) (aerodynamic sedan)
- Height: 1,600 mm (63 in) (sedan); 1,655 mm (65 in) (aerodynamic sedan)
- Curb weight: 1,000 kg (2,205 lb) (sedan); 1,280 kg (2,822 lb) (aerodynamic sedan)

Chronology
- Predecessor: Praga Piccolo
- Successor: Praga Lady

The Praga Super Piccolo is a car produced by Praga in Czechoslovakia between 1934 and 1936.

== Design ==
Launched at the 1934 Prague Motor Show, the Super Piccolo was designed as a mid-range replacement to the smaller Piccolo which would suit people who did not want the larger Alfa. Of conventional construction, with a rectangular frame chassis with X-shape stiffener, the car was initially produced as a four-door sedan only. This was joined by a small number of two-door Sidomka and Sodomkovy aerodynamic convertibles, but the biggest upheaval came at the 1935 Berlin Motor Show where Praga launched a distinctive aerodynamic sedan. The new model had a more curvilinear shape and covered front and rear wheels. The aerodynamic version was produced alongside the standard sedan.

Powered by a 26 kW (35 hp) 4 cylinder engine, the car could reach 100 km/h (62 mph) and return fuel economy between 11 and 13 L/100 km (21 and 18 mpg_{‑US}; 26 and 22 mpg_{‑imp}).

== Production ==
The vehicle was instantly popular and over 500 were sold in 1934. However, the price for the car was high. The standard car cost 46,500 CSK in 1935, while the aerodynamic sedan was even more expensive at 46,500 CSK. The standard price was reduced to 40,800 CSK in summer 1936 and production ceased before the end of the year.
