= Praga NDO =

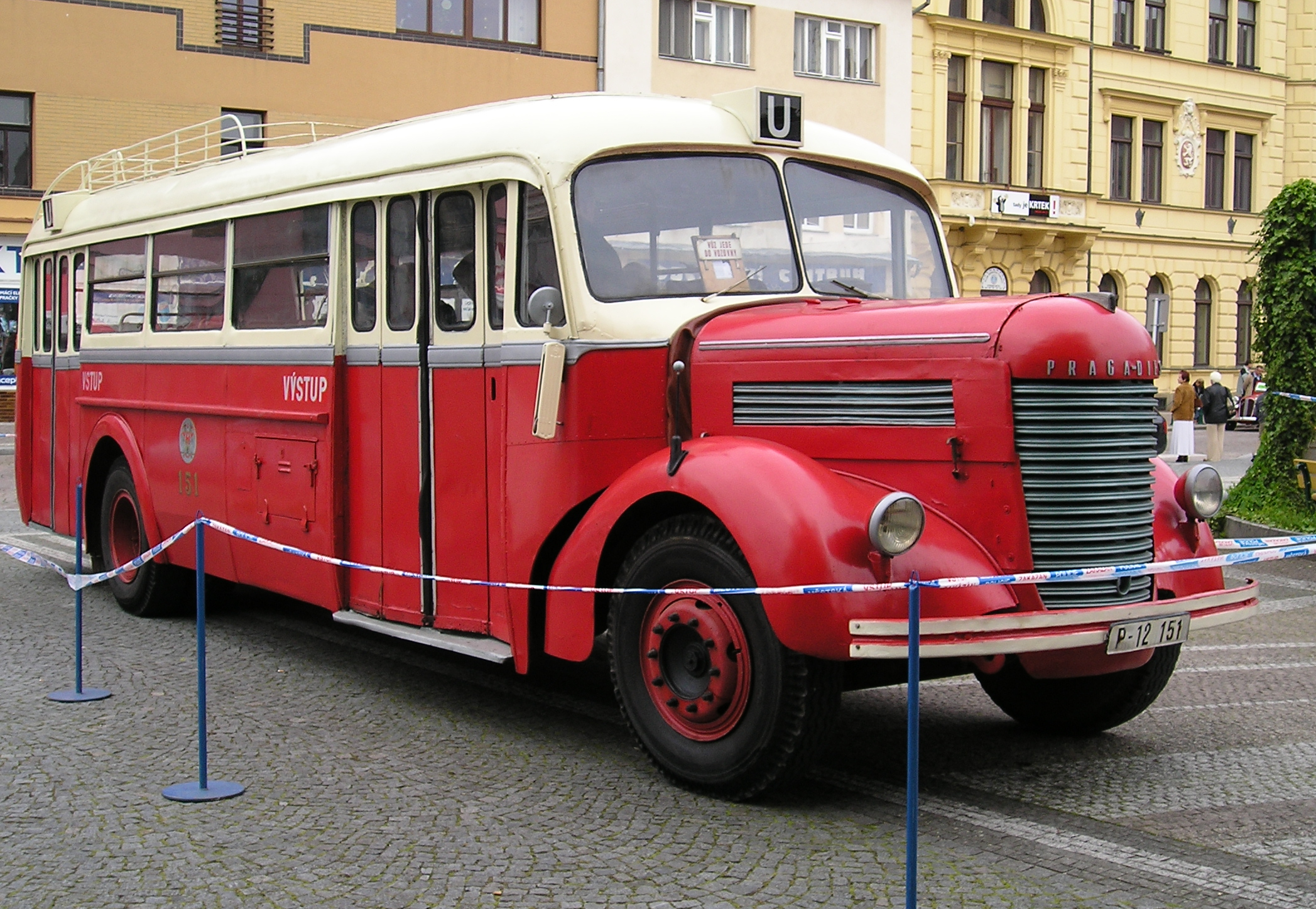
- Praga NDO, model 1947

Overview
- Manufacturer: Praga, Karosa
- Production: 1938–1948

Body and chassis
- Class: Bus
- Body style: Bonneted bus

Powertrain
- Engine: 80.9–91.9 kW (108.5–123.2 hp) gasoline engines
- Transmission: 5-speed

Dimensions
- Length: 9.86–10.6 m (388–417 in)
- Width: 2.3–2.5 m (91–98 in)
- Height: 2.8–2.95 m (110–116 in)
- Curb weight: 7,690–8,070 kg (16,954–17,791 lb)

Chronology
- Predecessor: Praga ND truck
- Successor: Škoda 706 RTO

The Praga NDO was a front-engined bonneted bus made by the Czech automaker Praga from 1938 to 1948.

== Development ==
The Praga NDO bus chassis was developed in the late 1930s in Czechoslovakia. The first buses manufactured by Praga in Brno were being used since 1938, but the German occupation of Czechoslovakia in March 1939 caused suspension of the production. A simultaneous switch to right-hand traffic in Czechoslovakia also forced the re-work of all existing buses. The production was resumed by Karosa in 1947, with the first bus appearing on route in Bratislava 3 December 1947. Other bus manufacturers in Czechoslovakia were shut down in 1948. By that time, the NDO bus chassis was thoroughly obsolete, but production of NDO bus continued due to urgent demand for mass transportation in the rebuilt Czech cities. After building 50 buses in 1947–1948, the NDO bus was replaced on production lines with the Škoda 706 RO bus, which was superseded in time by the Škoda 706 RTO.

== Construction ==
The construction of the NDO bus was based on the Praga ND truck, with the forward-located engine and its cowling unchanged. The bus body was mostly made of metal, only the roof was made of wood and canvas. The bus maximal speed was 55 km/h (34 mph). The maximal loaded weight of the bus was 13,600 kg (30,000 lb).

The long-haul layout featured a four seats per row, with central aisle and forward door. Driver had a separate door to the driving compartment. The capacity of long-haul NDO buses was 42 passengers. The short-haul layout featured wider aisle with seats arranged along the bus walls facing aisle. The folding door was located in the center of the bus body. The short-haul layout had the 65 passengers capacity, with 27 seats. Also, a short-hail version with the two doors was made. The front door was still operated from the driver's compartment, while the rear door was operated by the conductor.

== Usage ==
At least 50 NDO buses were used in Prague and 20 in Brno, some other buses were used in Bratislava. The buses were gradually retired from the municipal service in 1955-1958 being replaced by Škoda 706 RO, with at least one of the decommissioned buses were still on road in 1960s serving a club customers.
