= Praga (company) =

Czech manufacturing company

- Type: Společnost s ručením omezeným
- Industry: Manufacturing
- Founded: 1907
- Headquarters: Prague, Czech Republic
- Products: Cars, trucks, karts, planes
- Parent: PRAGA-Export s.r.o.
- Website: pragaglobal.com

Praga is a Czech manufacturing company based in Prague, Czech Republic. The company produced motorcycles, automobiles, trucks and airplanes. The Praga V3S 5-ton truck was used by the Czechoslovak Army for more than half a century. The current company produces karts, racing and road supersports and is involved in car racing. It produces up to 7,000 kart chassis every year, making it one of the most successful kart manufacturers in the world.

== History ==
=== Origins and early development ===
Praga originated in the Pražská továrna na automobily (“Prague Automobile Factory”), established in 1907 as a joint venture between the First Bohemian-Moravian Machine Works and the Ringhoffer works. Ringhoffer then withdrew from the business, and the factory became the automobile department of the First Bohemian-Moravian Machine Works. Its early vehicles were based on foreign designs, including cars manufactured under licence from Isotta Fraschini, Charron and Renault. The marque adopted the name Praga, the Latin name for Prague.

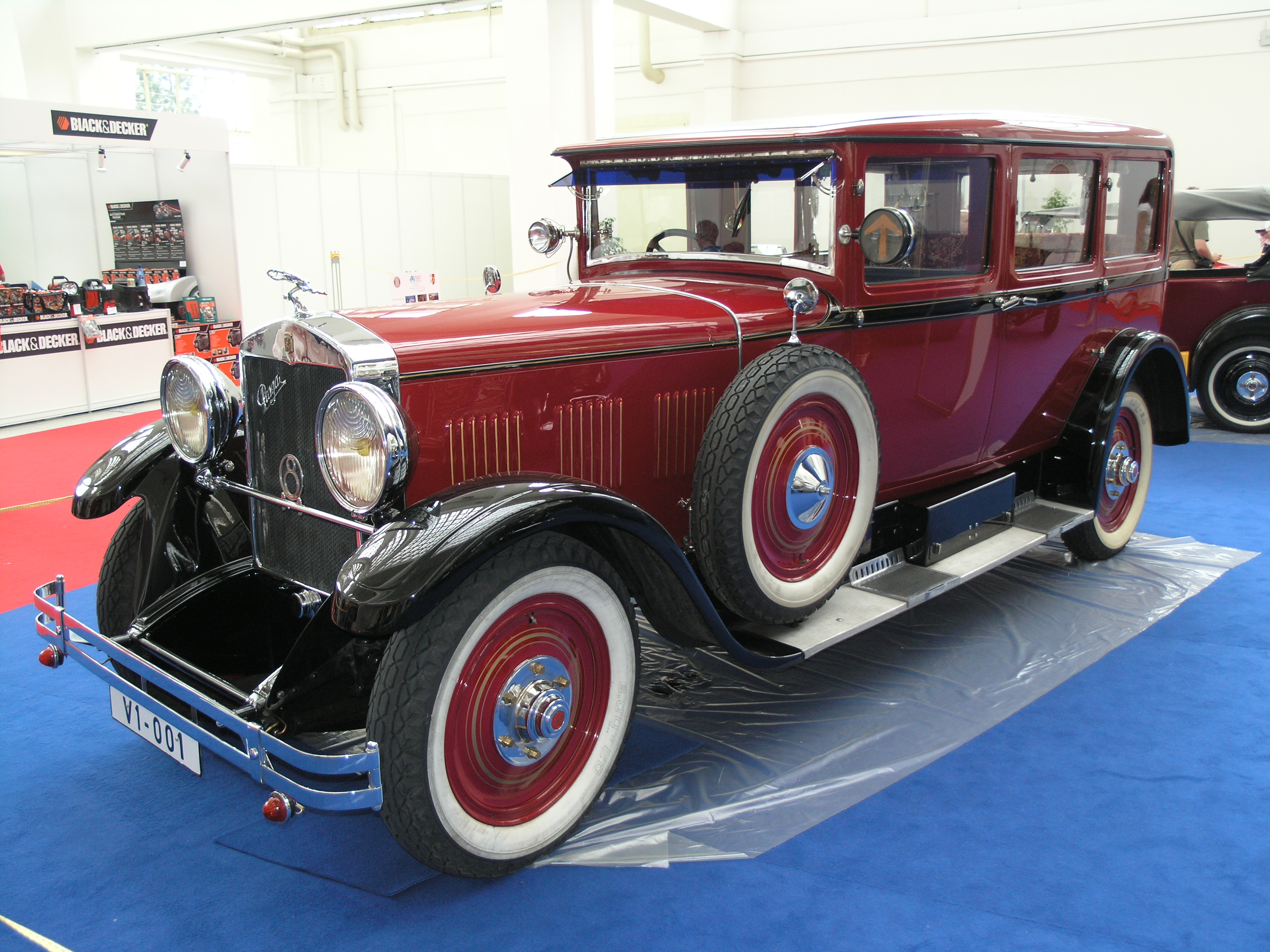
Praga Grand

František Kec became chief designer in 1911. That year, the army tested his Praga V truck, which led to first orders from the Austro-Hungarian military. Kec directed the development of passenger cars and commercial vehicles, becoming the factory’s director in 1919 and general director in 1927. His vision contributed to greater standardisation of components and the introduction of assembly lines. The factory also expanded into agricultural machinery, including motor ploughs.

=== Interwar expansion ===
The automobile department remained part of its parent engineering business. In 1921 the First Bohemian-Moravian Machine Works merged with Kolben’s electrical engineering company to form Českomoravská-Kolben. Then in 1927, Českomoravská-Kolben merged with Breitfeld-Daněk to form ČKD. Praga was its automobile division.

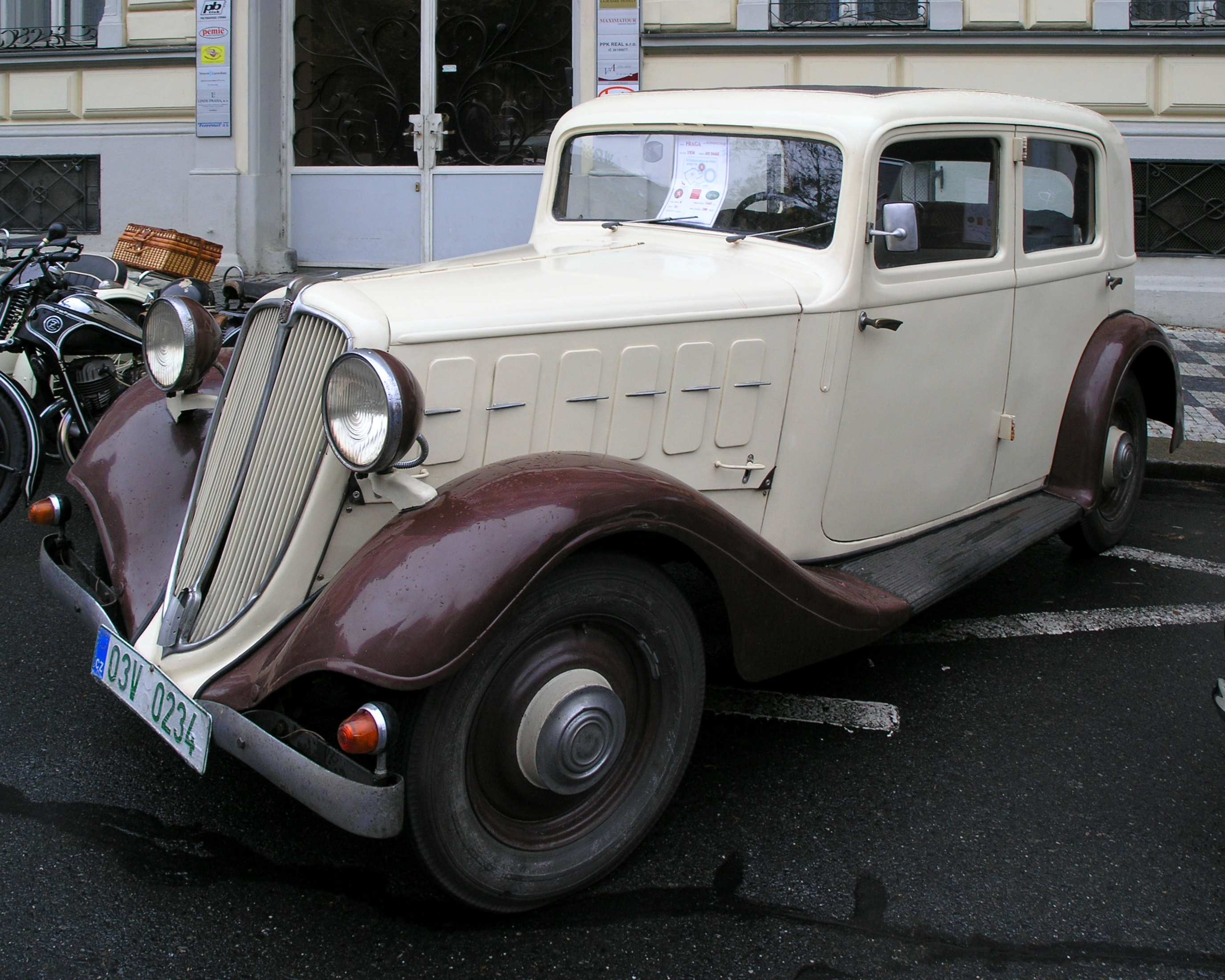
Praga Super Piccolo

Praga, Škoda and Tatra were Czechoslovakia’s three main car manufacturers between the world wars. Praga led domestic car sales in the late 1920s and early 1930s. Its small Piccolo went on sale in 1924, and in October 1931 the factory announced that it had built and sold 10,000 of them.

=== War and postwar reconstruction ===
An air raid on 25 March 1945 largely destroyed Praga’s factory in Libeň. After the war, automobile production was transferred to the former Junkers factory in nearby Vysočany, where manufacture of RN and RND trucks resumed in October 1945. The business was nationalised that month.

Praga assembled a few more Lady and Piccolo cars from parts left over from wartime production. The last passenger cars were built in 1947, after which the factory made commercial vehicles.

=== Trucks and transmissions ===
Production of the Praga V3S military truck began in 1953. The Czechoslovak armed forces used the six-wheel-drive truck for transport and as the basis for specialist vehicles. An armoured chassis derived from the V3S was used for the M53/59 self-propelled anti-aircraft gun, development of which began in 1957.

In 1964, truck assembly was transferred to Letňany, while the Vysočany factory specialised in transmissions. Praga supplied gearboxes to other vehicle manufacturers, including automatic transmissions used in Ikarus buses. Budapest transport operator BKV acquired several thousand Praga automatic transmissions from the early 1970s.

=== Restructuring after 1989 ===
==== The Praga holding group ====
Praga continued to manufacture gearboxes and spare parts for commercial vehicles after 1989. Its customers included Avia and Karosa, and it produced 7,200 gearboxes in 1996. The Praga UV 80 multipurpose truck entered production in 1992.

In 1997, Praga a.s. was the parent of a holding group with about 2,500 employees. Its subsidiaries included Praga Čáslav, Praga Louny, Praga Strašnice and Praga Hrádek nad Nisou. It had recently acquired Technometra Praha, a manufacturer of aircraft hydraulic equipment in Hostivař. Technometra later became Praga Hostivař. The holding’s parent company was declared bankrupt in September 1999.

Praga Čáslav manufactured commercial and municipal vehicles, including the Alfa, Golden and Grand models. Production declined during the early 2000s, and the company entered liquidation in January 2004.

==== Praga Hostivař ====
Praga Hostivař manufactured transmissions and aircraft hydraulic components. It also revived motorcycle manufacture with enduro models in the late 1990s. The last Praga motorcycles were assembled from leftover parts in 2004. Praga Hostivař continued to make gearboxes after motorcycle production ended.

The aircraft-component business continued through Praga Letecká Výroba, a new company established in May 2009. Praga Hostivař initially held an 80 per cent interest. Praga Letecká Výroba made pumps, valves and filters for aircraft hydraulic systems and carried out repairs. In 2011, it changed its name to Technometra Český Brod. Aero Vodochody bought the company in March 2024.

==== Praga-Export ====
In July 2006, Praga Hostivař established Praga-Export as a wholly owned subsidiary. Praga-Export became a partner of Iveco Defence Vehicles in the Czech Republic and Slovakia, providing vehicle sales, servicing and spare parts. Petr Ptáček became its direct sole owner in April 2008.

== Karting ==
Praga entered karting in 2011 through an investment in the Italian manufacturer Intrepid Kart International. Praga-branded chassis were subsequently manufactured by IPKarting at its factory in Salizzole, near Verona, alongside the Formula K, OK1 and RS Kart ranges.

Production continued under the Praga name, and its Monster EVO 3 chassis was selected for the Micro MAX and electric E10 categories at the 2026 Rotax MAX Challenge Grand Finals.

== Motorsport and road cars ==
=== Racing ===
Praga-Export bought a 50 per cent stake in the Slovak racing-car manufacturer Race4 in 2011. Race4 was renamed Praga Cars, and the two businesses worked together on the Praga racing car. The Praga R1 followed, entering the Supercar Challenge in 2013.

In Spain, Praga España worked with the Circuit Ricardo Tormo’s driver-development programme through the Fórmula de Campeones–Praga team. It raced Tatuus F4-T014 cars in the Spanish Formula 4 Championship. Kilian Meyer finished runner-up in 2019, while the team placed third in the team standings in 2020.

The R1 also raced in the Britcar Endurance Championship. Danny Harrison and Jem Hepworth won the overall title in 2020, driving a Praga R1T for VR Motorsport. Britcar introduced a separate Praga class in 2021, with seven R1s starting its first race at Silverstone in April. The Praga Cup UK began in 2022 as a one-make series for the R1.

=== Road cars ===
The company unveiled its next road car, the two-seat Bohema, in November 2022. Production started in January 2024. The first customer received their car in the Netherlands that December, with 89 cars planned in total.

== Products ==
=== Automobiles ===
- Praga Mignon (1911–1929)
- Praga Grand (1912–1932) - limousine
- Praga Alfa (1913–1942)
- Praga Baby (1934–1937)
- Praga Piccolo (1924–1941)
- Praga Super Piccolo (1934–1936)
- Praga Golden (1935–1938)
- Praga Lady (1935–1947)

All Praga automobile production stopped by 1947, but was restarted in 2011 when Praga constructed the R4S. It utilized a 3.2 liter V8 based on the Suzuki Hayabusa engine and produces 530 BHP, with a total weight of only 880 kilograms. A feature on the R4S are the markings for camber and toe, which eliminates the need of advanced tools, with a specific amount of "clicks" representing a certain degree of camber or toe.

- Praga R4S (2011) - racing car
- Praga R1 (2013–) - racing car
- Praga R1R (2016–2019) - sports car
- Praga Bohema (2023–) - sports car
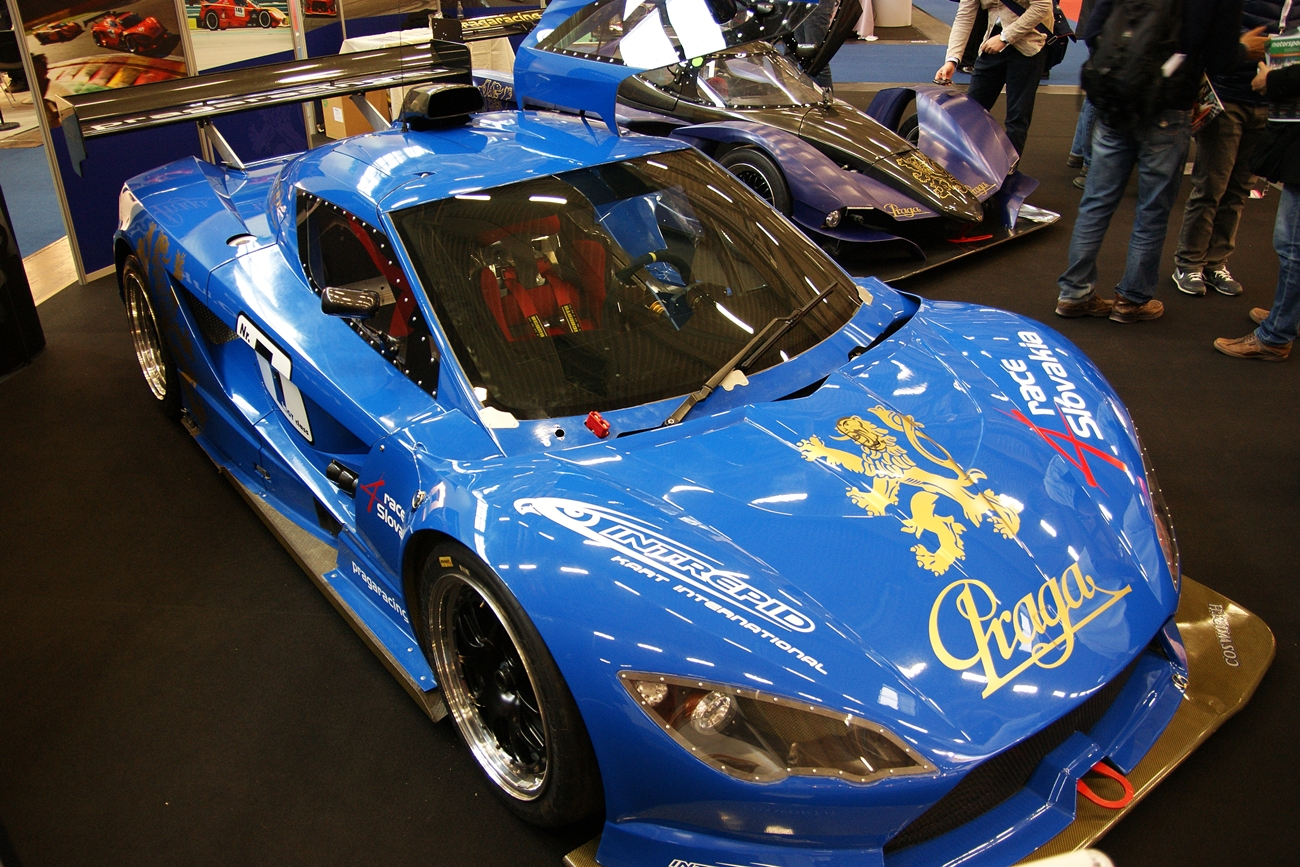
Praga R4S

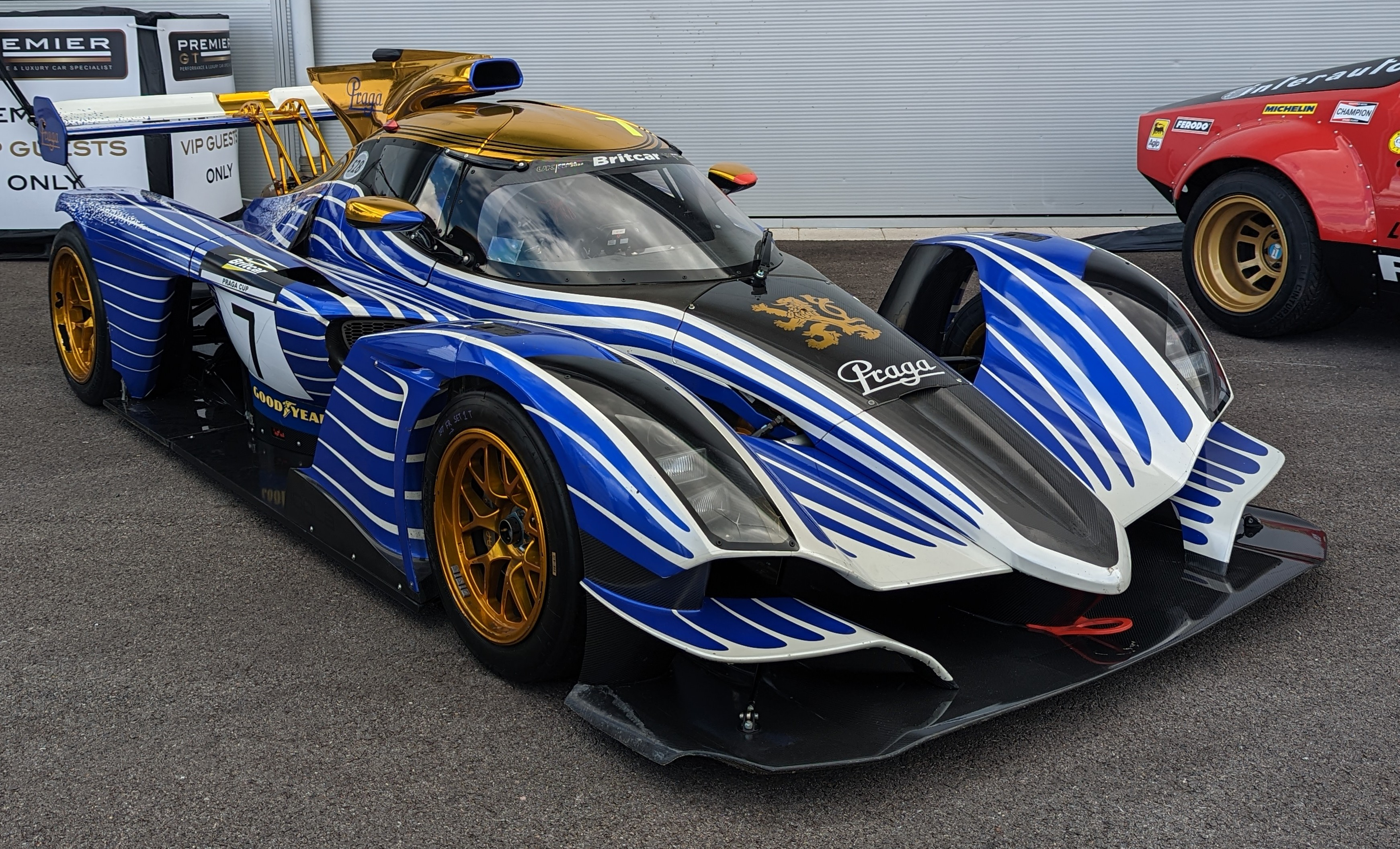
Praga R1

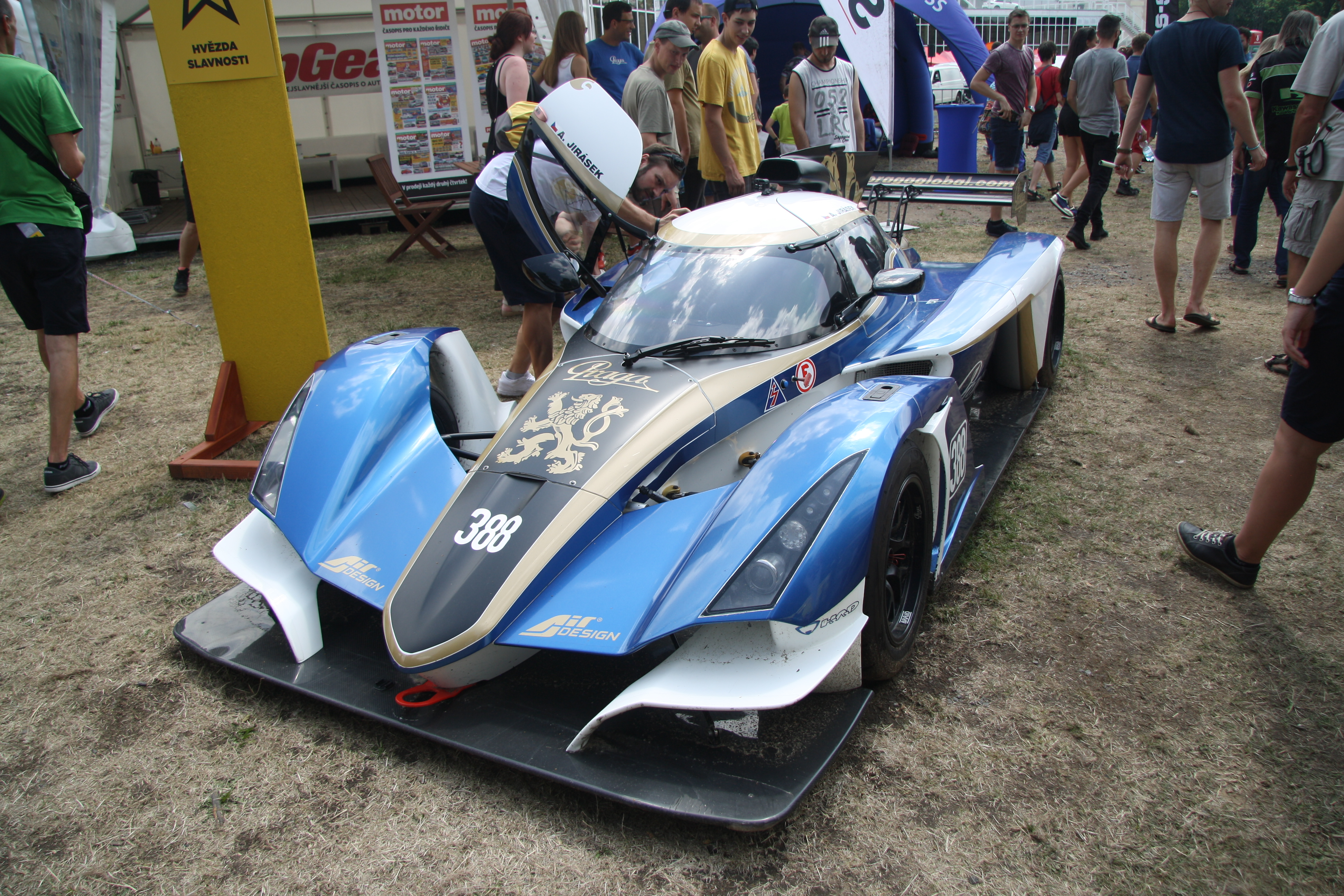
Praga R1R

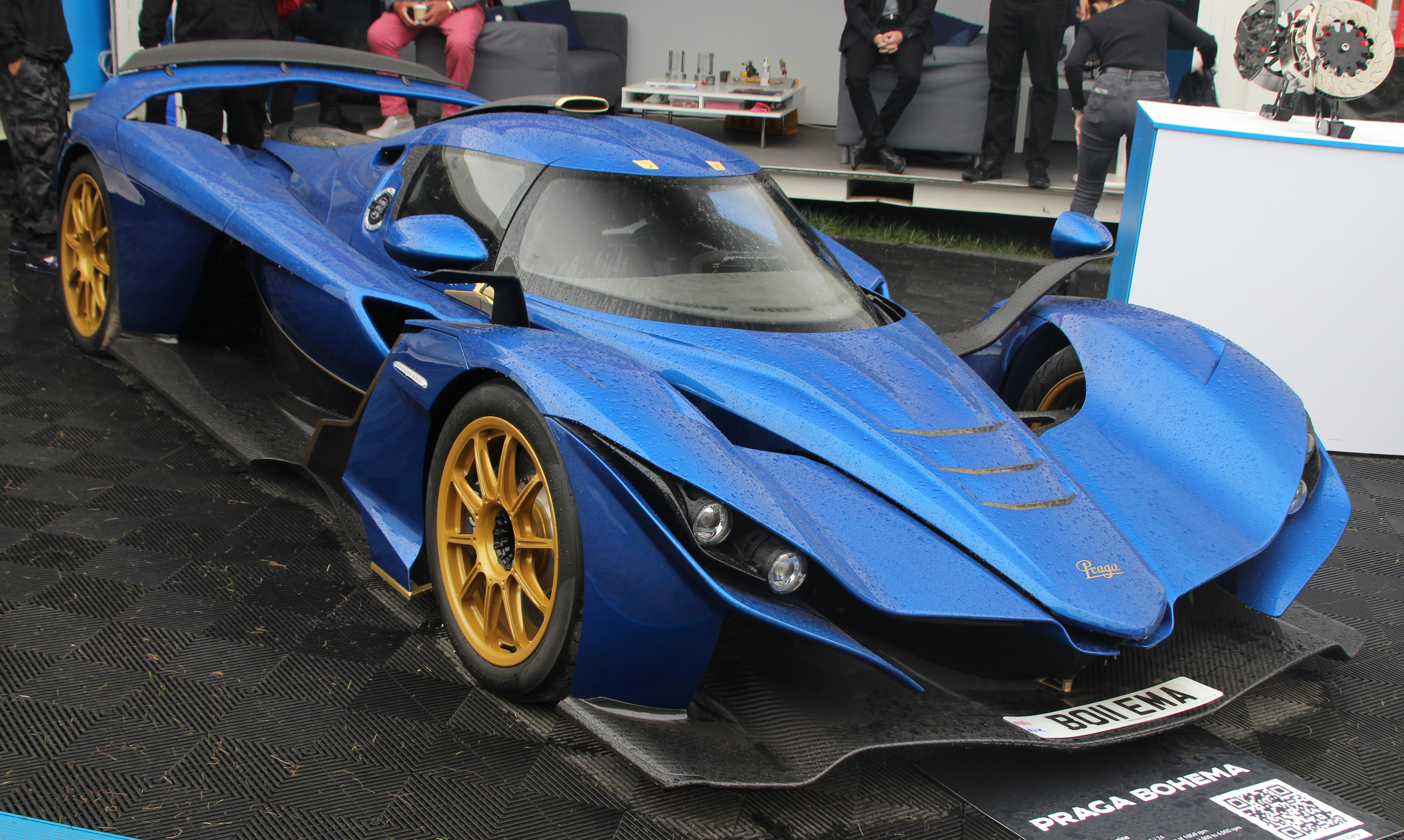
Praga Bohema

=== Motorcycles ===
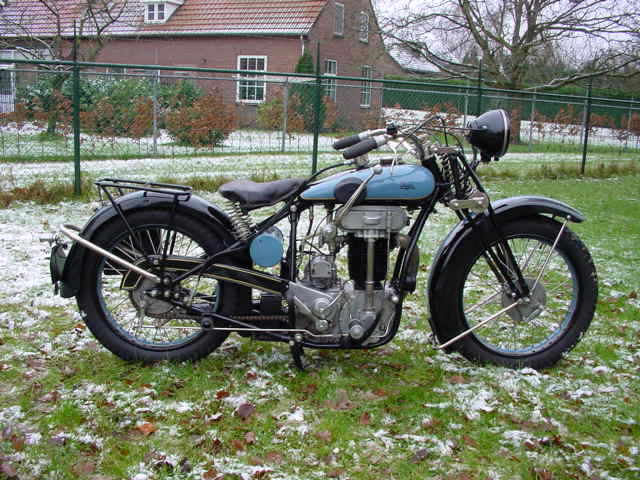
1929 Praga BD 500 DOHC motorcycle

- Praga BD 500 DOHC (cs) (1929–1933)
- Praga BC 350 OHC (cs) (1932–1933)
- Praga ED 250 (1999–2003) - enduro
- Praga ED 610 (2000–2003) - enduro
- Praga ZS 800 (2023)

=== Praga Trucks ===
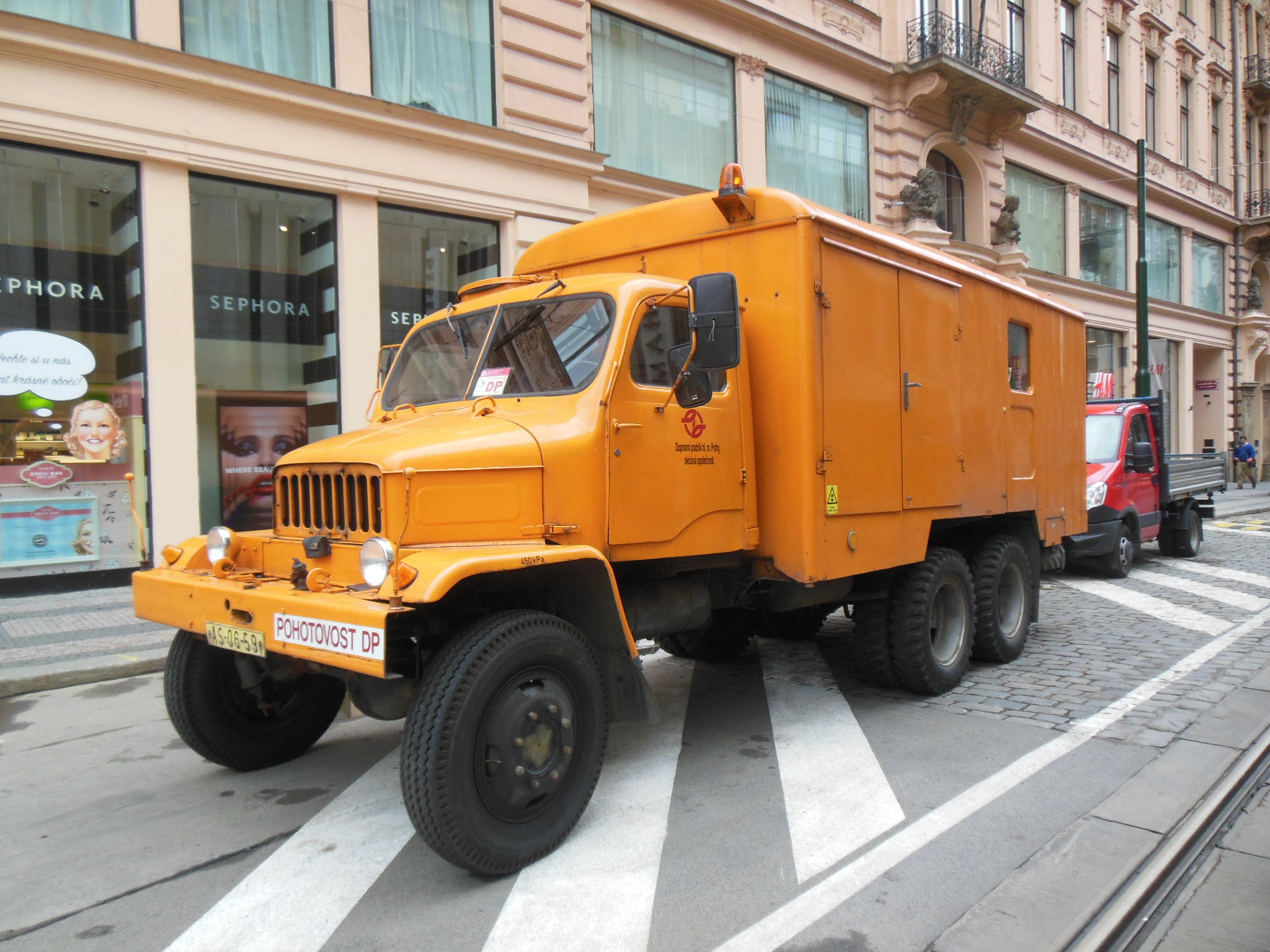
Praga V3S was one of the best off-road trucks of its time

- Praga N (1915–1931) - 4 ton truck (4x2)
  - Praga TN - a base for Romanian ČKD TN SPE armoured car (8 built)
- Praga A150 (1947–1951) - 1.5 ton light truck (4x2)
- Praga RN (1933–1953) - 3 ton truck (4x2)
  - Praga RND (1934–1955) - modification of RN with diesel engine
- Praga RV (1935–1939) - 2 ton army truck (6x4)
- Praga ND (1938-?) - 7 ton heavy truck (4x2)
- Praga V3S (1953–1990) - 3 ton all-terrain truck (6x6), produced around 130,000 units
- Praga S5T (cs) (1956–1974) - 5 ton truck (4x2)
- Praga UV100 (prototype 1985)
- Praga UV120 (prototype 1985)
- Praga UV80 (1992–2001) - multi-purpose medium truck (4x4)
- Praga GRAND (2001–2008) - 11 ton truck

=== Buses ===
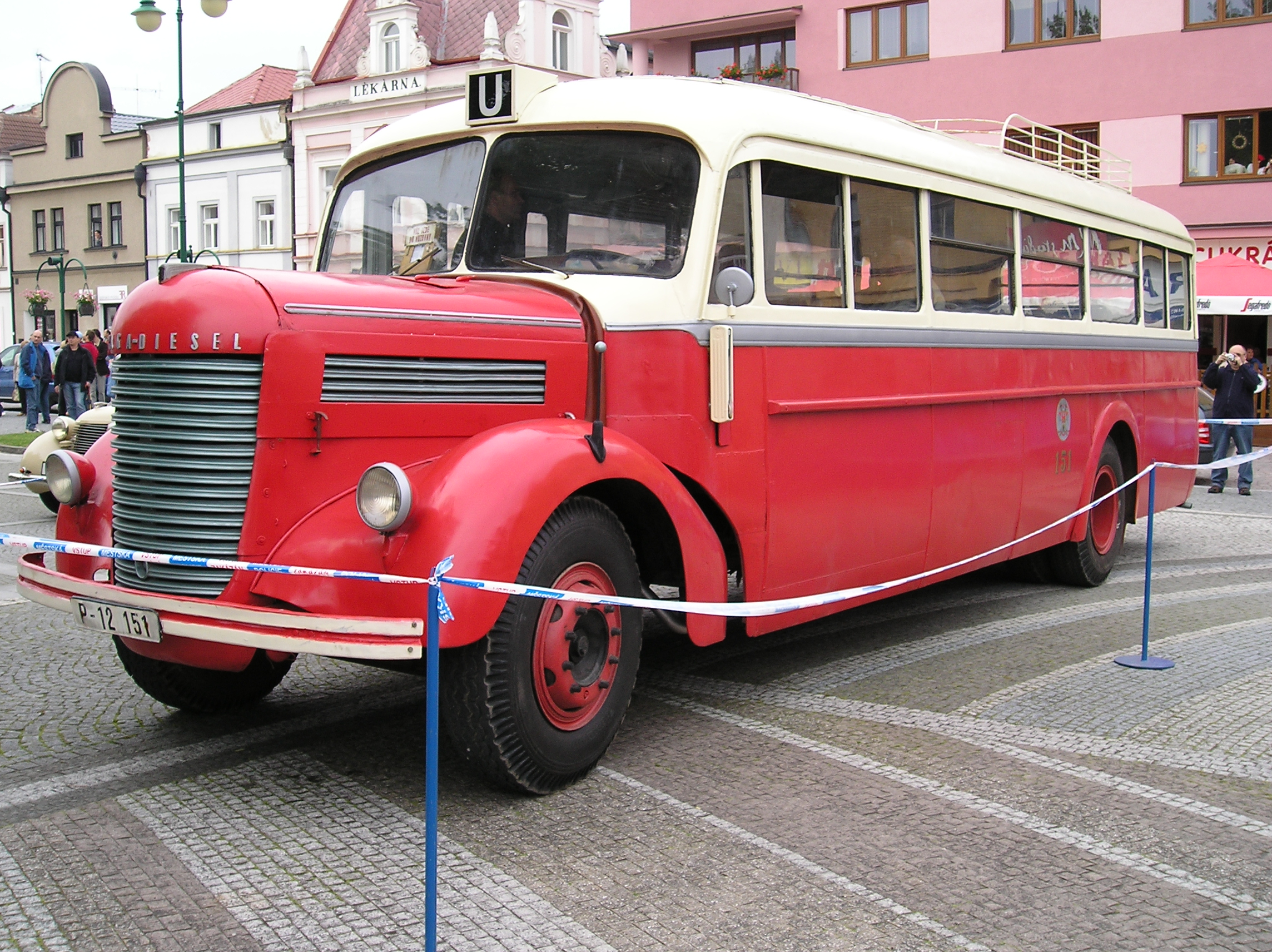
Bus Praga NDO

- Praga NDO (1938–1948)
- Praga RN and RND
- Praga A150 - autobus version of the A150 truck

=== Trolleybuses ===
- Praga TOT
- Unrealized projects: Praga TNT and Praga TB 2

=== Light Tank ===
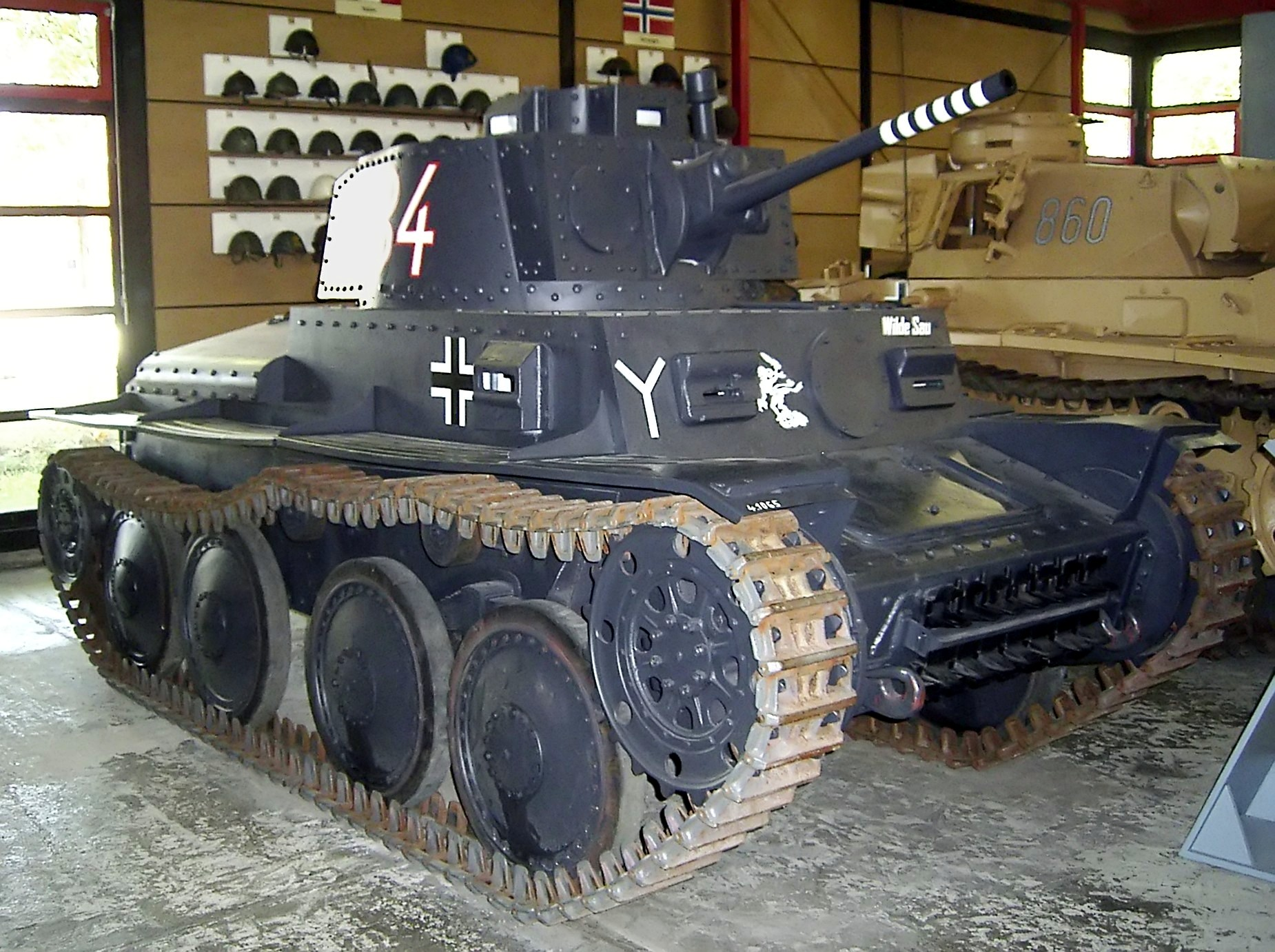
Tank Praga LT vz. 38 (Panzer 38t) in the German Tank Museum

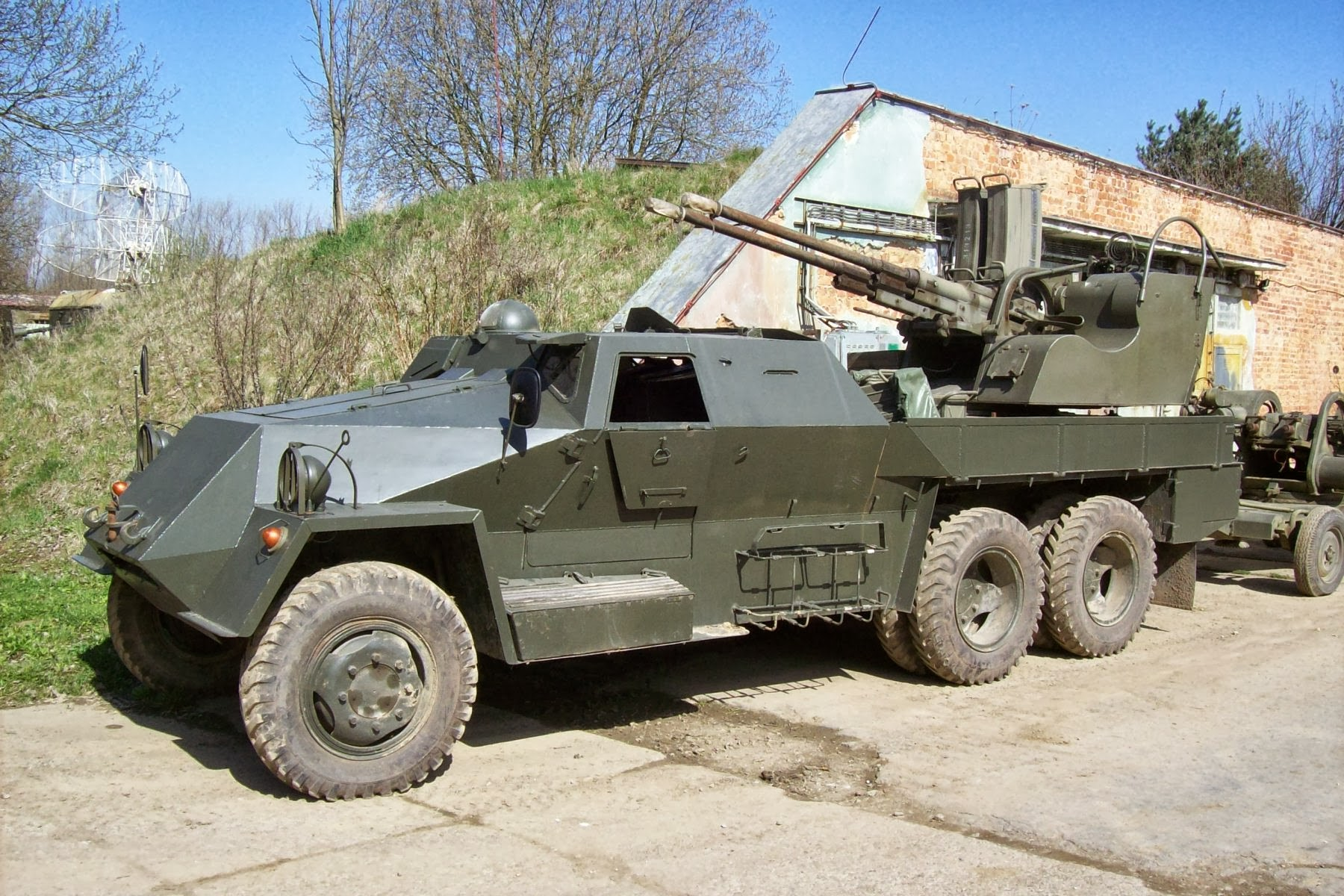
Self-propelled anti-aircraft gun PLdvK vz. 53/59 (1959–1978). The chassis and motor was produced in Praga.

- Praga LT vz. 38 (od 1938) light tank in service with the German Wehrmacht as Panzer 38(t)
  - Praga LTH export version of the LT to Switzerland where it was called the Panzerwagen 39.

=== Aircraft ===
- Praga BH-41 (E-41)
- Praga BH-44 (E-44)
- Praga BH-111
- Praga E-36
- Praga E-39 (BH-39)
- Praga E-40
- Praga E-45
- Praga E-51
- Praga E-55
- Praga E-112
- Praga E-114
- Praga E-115
- Praga E-117
- Praga E-141
- Praga E-180
- Praga E-210
- Praga E-211
- Praga E-212
- Praga E-214
- Praga E-241

=== Artillery tractors ===
- Praga T-3 (1935–1941)
- Praga T-4 (1935–1939)
- Praga T-6 (1937–1944)
- Praga T-7 and T-8 (1937-?)
- Praga T-9 (1937–1943)

=== Karts ===
- Praga Baby
- Praga Dark
- Praga America
- Praga Monster
- Praga Fighter
- Praga Dragon
