= Praga RV =

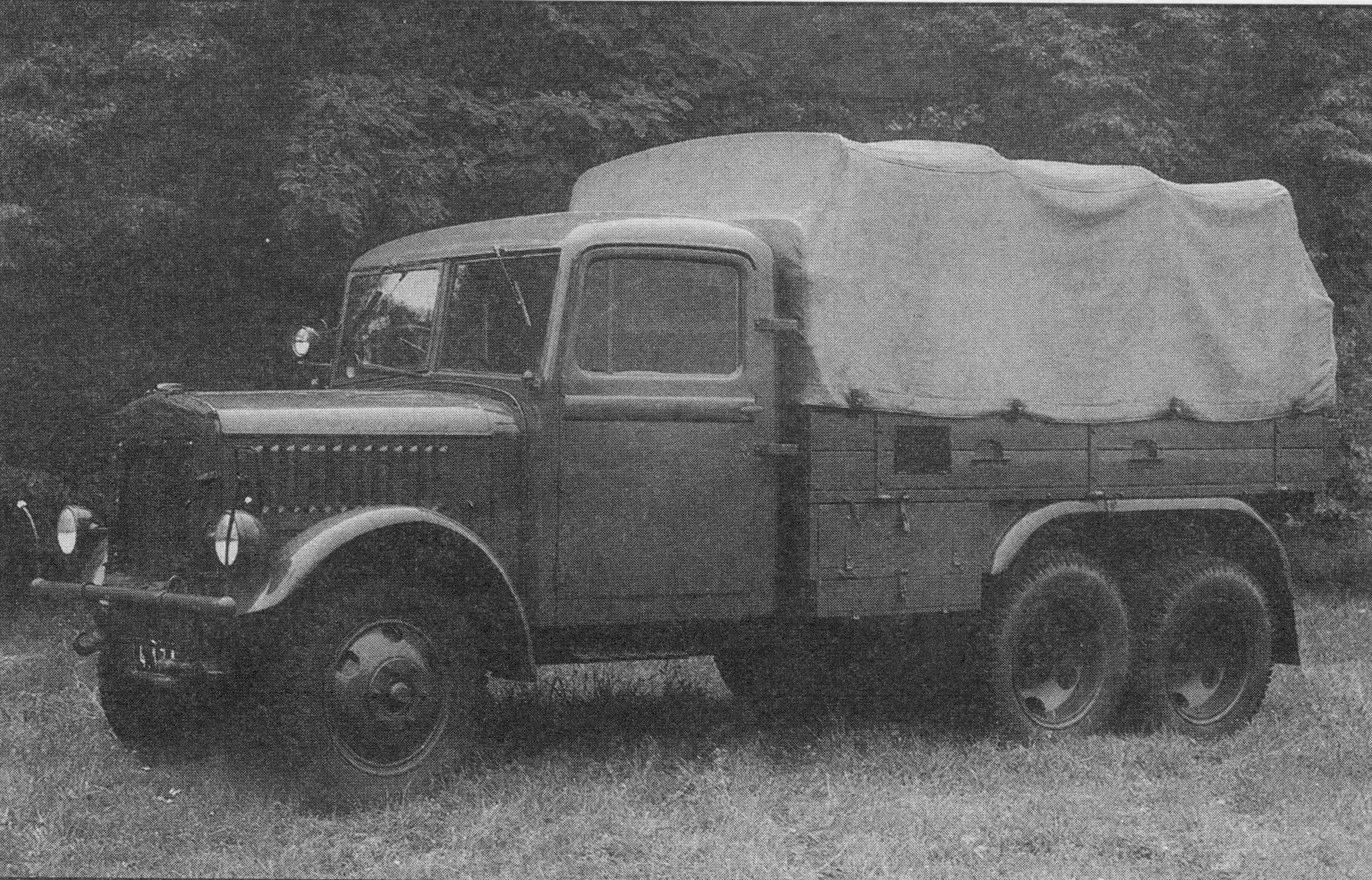
- Praga RV

Overview
- Manufacturer: Praga
- Production: 1935–1939; 5500 produced

Body and chassis
- Class: Truck
- Body style: Conventional

Powertrain
- Engine: 68 hp (51 kW)
- Transmission: 4-speed manual + 1-speed gearbox

Dimensions
- Wheelbase: 4.48 m (176.4 in)
- Length: 5.69 m (224 in)
- Width: 2 m (79 in)
- Height: 2.5 m (98 in)
- Curb weight: 3,810 kg (8,400 lb)

Chronology
- Predecessor: Praga RN

The Praga RV was an army off-road truck model made by Czech manufacturer Praga between 1935 and 1939. It was mainly used for transporting military cargo, personnel, as ambulance and for towing artillery pieces in Czech and later German and Romanian armies. 3290 vehicles were slated for use in Czechoslovakia while the rest was exported to Iran, Peru, Poland, Sweden, Switzerland and Turkey.

Praga RV engine had a cylinders work volume of 3468cc and supplied 68 horsepower (51 kW) at 2600rpm. The fuel consumption was up to 35 liters per 100 km. The car had 3 axles, of which both back axles were driven. It had 4 gears and 1 reverse gear. The truck was rated for 2000 kg payload. The Praga RV was capable to travel at 70 km/h (43 mph) speed for 390 km without refueling of 137 liters fuel tank. When carrying infantry, typical capacity was 8-12 men, 7–11 in trunk and one in cabin besides driver. Also, it was capable to pull the 3-ton trailer. With trailer, Praga RV fuel consumption do increase to 49 liters per 100 km.

59 trucks were modified in 1938 to produce Praga RVR radio communication vehicle.

An unknown number of Praga trucks was acquired by the Romanian Army in order to increase its level of mechanization.

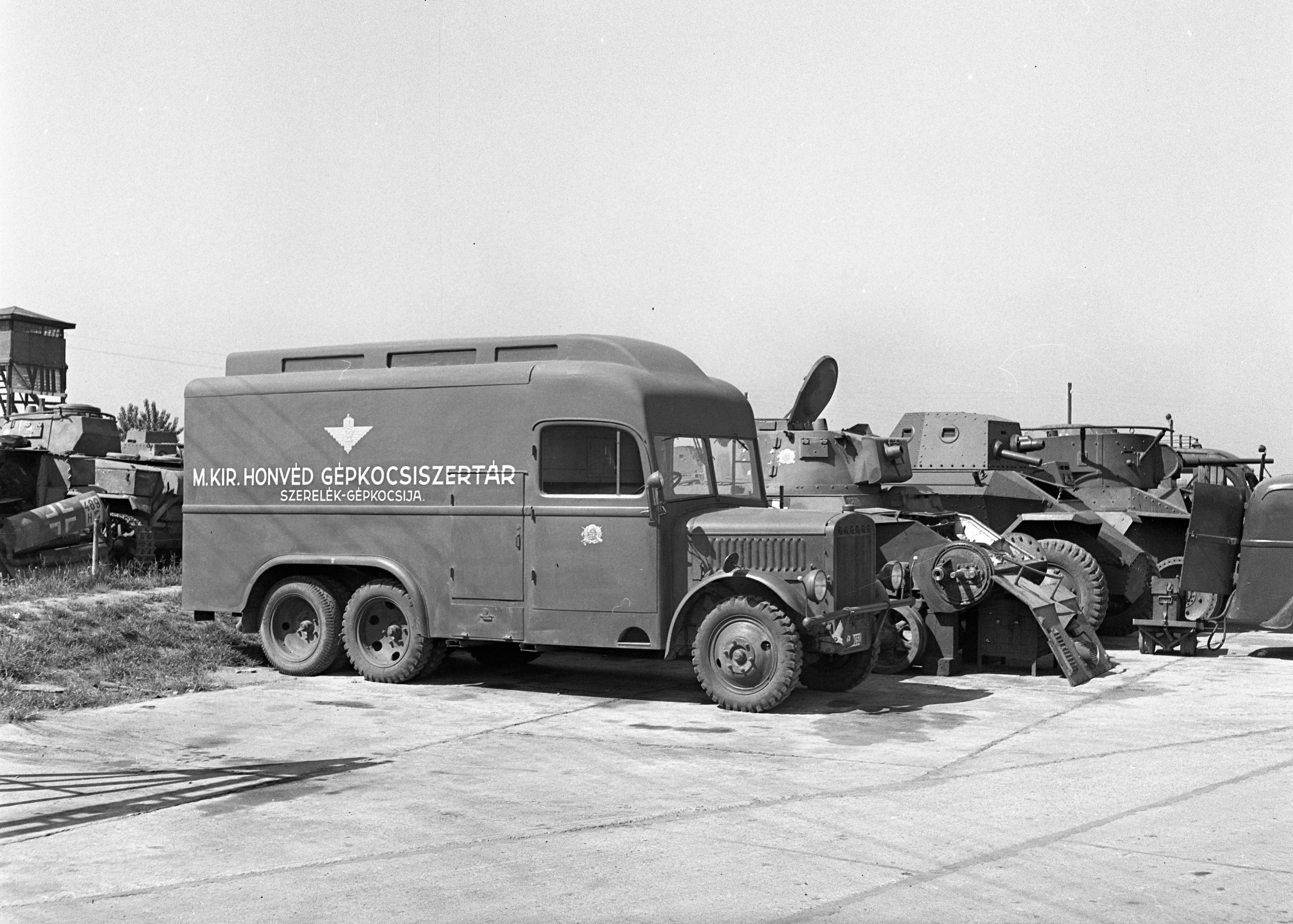
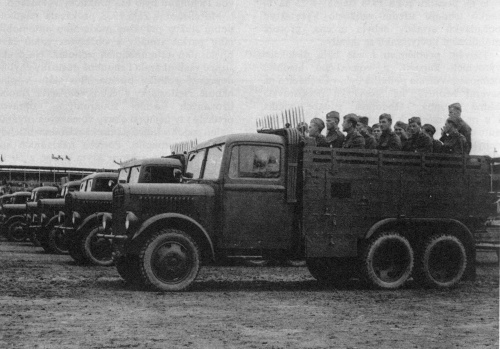

== Similar contemporary trucks ==
- Tatra 92
- 2½-ton 6×6 truck
