= Eugen Böhringer =

German racing driver

- Nationality: (Germany) German
- Born: January 22, 1922 Rotenberg, Weimar Republic
- Died: June 19, 2013 (aged 91) Stuttgart, Germany
- Retired: 1965

European Rally Championship
- Teams: Mercedes-Benz
- Best finish: 1st in 1962

Championship titles
- 1962: European Rally Championship

Eugen Böhringer (22 January 1922 – 19 June 2013) was a German racing driver and hotelier who spent the majority of his racing career on the Mercedes-Benz works team. A specialist in grueling long-distance events, his crowning achievement was victory in the 1962 European Rally Championship.

== Early life ==
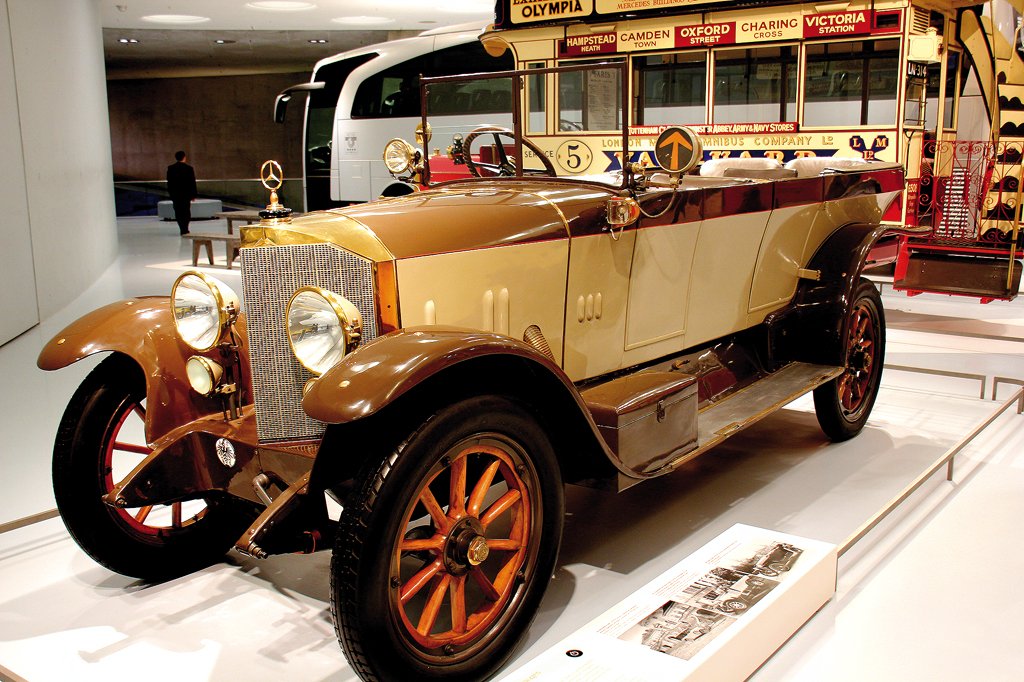
1921 Mercedes-Knight 16-45 PS Tourenwagen in the Mercedes-Benz Museum

Eugen Böhringer was born on 22 January 1922 in Rotenberg, Stuttgart to Gottfried and Emma Böhringer. By 1925 the family owned a Mercedes-Knight 16/45 PS Tourenwagen, and Emma Böhringer was one of the first women in the Stuttgart area to have a driver's license. In 1928, his father started a bus service between Rotenberg and Untertürkheim for commuting employees of the Mercedes-Benz plant located there. Before becoming a driver, Eugen worked as a chef at the family's hotel and restaurant. His road to fame began with him entering a Mercedes-Benz W105 in local and regional competitions for a wager with friends.

== Racing career ==
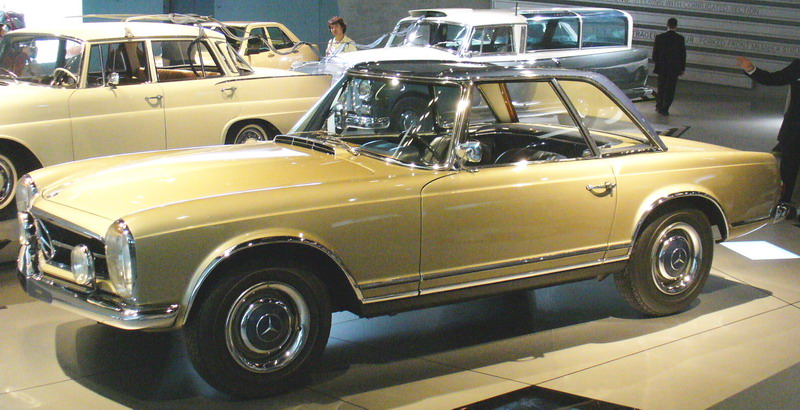
Böhringer drove various Mercedes roadsters, including the 230 SL "Pagoda"

Early successes brought a promotion to the Mercedes-Benz works team for 1960, and a second-place finish at Rallye Monte-Carlo behind the wheel of a Mercedes-Benz 220 SE Tourenwagen. The "fintail" saloons became his trademark, as he developed a reputation for nimble driving in rallies which often exceeded 5,000 kilometers.

== Race results ==
=== 1958 ===
- Stuttgart Solitude Rally, 1st place

=== 1959 ===
- Stuttgart Solitude Rally, 1st place

=== 1960 ===
- Rally Monte Carlo, 2nd place
- Coupe des Alpes, 2nd in class

=== 1961 ===
- Rally Monte Carlo, 1st place in over 2000 cc class
- Tulpenrallye, 1st place
- Rally Acropolis, 1st place in over 2000 cc class
- Coupe des Alpes, 2nd place in class
- Rajd Polski, 1st place
- Liège–Sofia–Liège, 4th place
- Deutschland-Rallye, 2nd place

=== 1962 ===
- Rally Monte Carlo, 2nd place overall, 1st in class
- Tulpenrallye, 1st in over 2000 cc class
- Rally Acropolis, 1st place
- Midnight Sun Rally Sweden, 5th place overall, 1st in class
- Rallye Solitude, 2nd place
- Rajd Polski, 1st place
- Liège–Sofia–Liège, 1st place
- Deutschland-Rallye, 2nd place

=== 1963 ===
- Rally Acropolis, 1st place
- International ADAC 6-Hour-Race, 2nd in over 2500 cc class
- Deutschland-Rallye, 1st place
- Spa-Sofia-Liège, 1st place
- Argentine Touring Car Grand Prix, 1st place

=== 1964 ===
- Rally Monte Carlo, 1st in over 2000 cc class
- Brands Hatch 6-Hour-Race, 1st in class
- 6 Hours of Zolder, 3rd in class
- International ADAC 6-Hour-Race, 1st place
- Macau Touring Car Grand Prix, 1st place
- Spa-Sofia-Liège, 3rd place
- Argentine Touring Car Grand Prix, 1st place

=== 1965 ===
- Rally Monte Carlo, 2nd overall, 1st in class
