= Praga Grand =

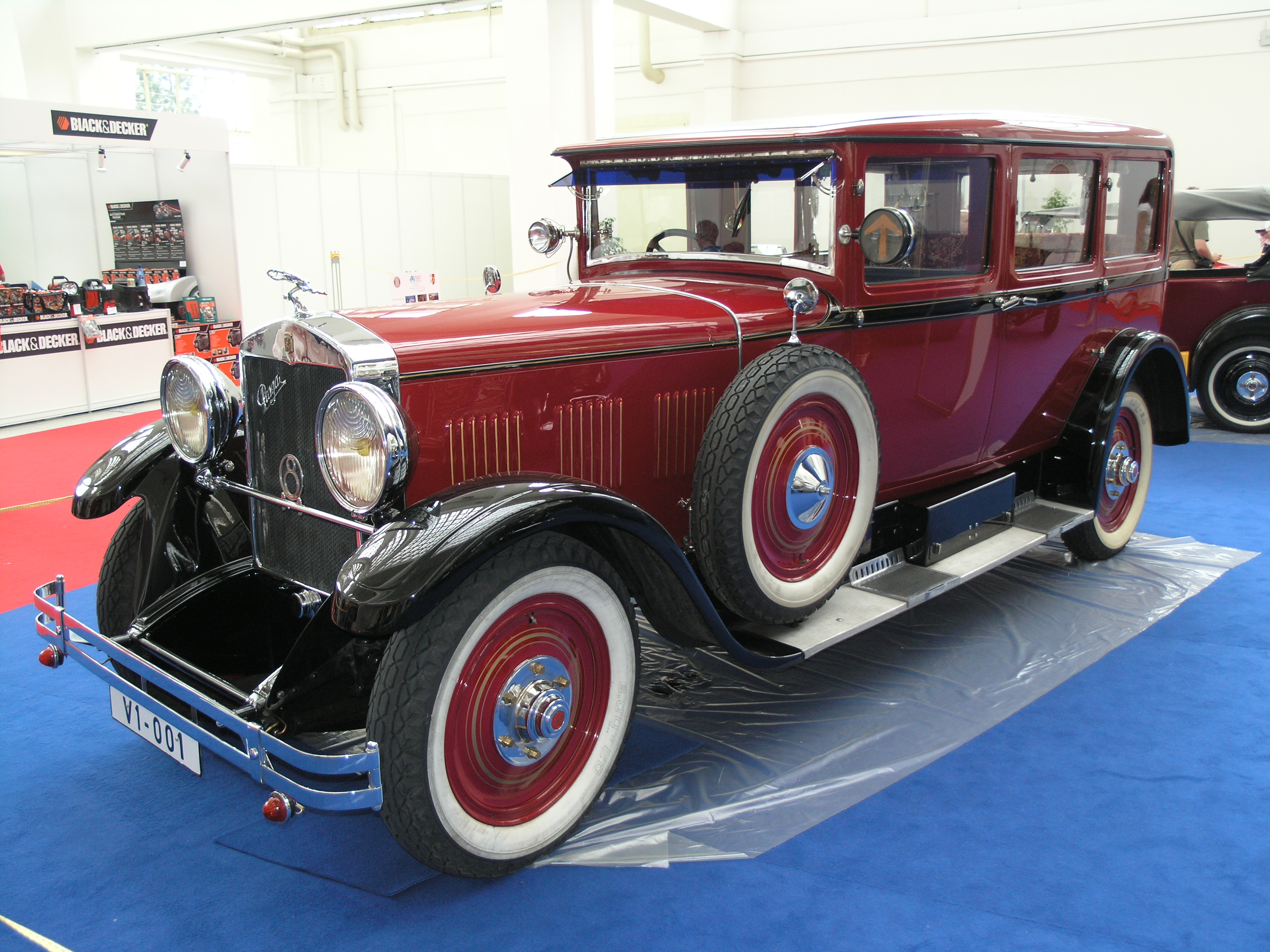
- 1929 Praga Grand

Overview
- Manufacturer: Praga
- Production: 1912–1935
- Assembly: Libeň, Prague, Czechoslovakia
- Designer: František Kec

Body and chassis
- Body style: 4-door 6-seat limousine; 4-door 6-seat phaeton; 4-door 7-seat limousine
- Layout: FR layout

Powertrain
- Engine: 3,824 cc (3.8 L) I4 (1912); 3,392 cc (3.4 L) I8 (1927); 3,580 cc (3.6 L) I8 (1929); 4,429 cc (4.4 L) I8 (1930)
- Transmission: 4-speed manual

Dimensions
- Wheelbase: 3,300 mm (130 in) (1912); 3,450 mm (136 in) (1928); 3,600 mm (140 in) (1930)
- Length: 4,800 mm (190 in) (1928); 5,280 mm (208 in) (1931); 5,700 mm (220 in) (1935)
- Width: 1,650 mm (65 in) (1928); 1,760 mm (69 in) (1931); 1,850 mm (73 in) (1935)
- Height: 1,800 mm (71 in) (1928); 1,860 mm (73 in) (1931); 1,850 mm (73 in) (1935)
- Curb weight: 2,130 kg (4,700 lb) (1931); 2,480 kg (5,470 lb) (1935)

Chronology
- Successor: Praga Golden

The Praga Grand was a luxury automobile manufactured by Praga in Libeň, Prague. Production of the first Grand, equipped with a four-cylinder engine, started in the Kingdom of Bohemia in 1912 and continued after the dissolution of Austro-Hungary in the First Czechoslovak Republic. It was used by the Austro-Hungarian Army during World War I as a staff car. The Praga Grand 8 introduced in 1927 had an eight-cylinder engine and was the official state car for the Czechoslovak president Tomáš Garrigue Masaryk. The car also achieved limited success in road racing.

== Development ==
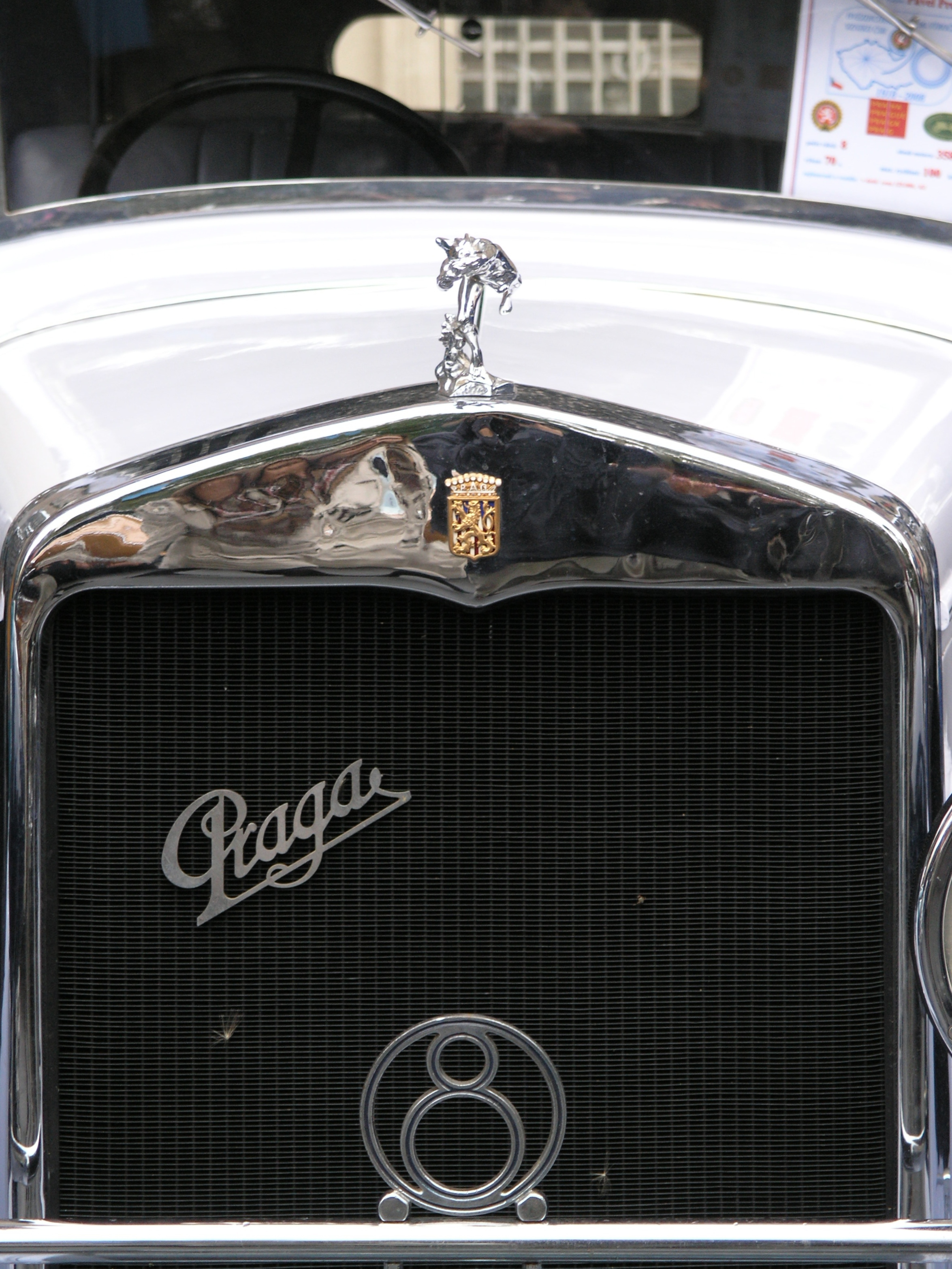
Detail of a 1929 Grand

The Grand was the second car produced by Praga, and was designed by chief designer František Kec to be a more luxurious complement to the Mignon. The design was typical of its period, with a separate rectangular frame chassis to which different bodies could be fitted. The engine had four cylinders, displaced 3,824 cc (233.4 in^{3}), produced 33.1 kW (44.4 hp) and was equipped with an electric starter. This engine was also used in the first tractors produced by Praga. The chassis had a wheelbase of 3.3 m (10 ft 10 in) and weighed 1,130 kg (2,490 lb), and the total weight of the car with a typical six seat enclosed body was 2,150 kg (4,740 lb).

In September 1927, the design was upgraded. A new engine was fitted which had eight cylinders to give a smoother and calmer ride alongside more power, with 40.5 kW (54.3 hp) available. Features included a dashboard-mounted speedometer with trip meter, clock and fuel gauge, electric indicators and hydraulic brakes. It could reach speeds of 100 km/h (62 mph) and return fuel economies of between 16 and 20 L/100 km (18 and 14 mpg_{‑imp}; 15 and 12 mpg_{‑US}), substantially more efficient than the previous four-cylinder model. The models ranged in weight from 1,780 and 1,900 kg (3,920 and 4,190 lb).

Further development of the vehicle design took place during the ensuing years. An even larger engine was introduced in 1929 with bore increased from 70 to 72 mm (2.8 to 2.8 in), displacement increased to 3,580 cc (218 in^{3}) and power to 44 kW (59 hp). The new model was known as the 17/60 HP. It was soon superseded by an even larger engine, the 4,429 cc (270.3 in^{3}) with eight cylinders each of 80 mm (3.1 in) bore and 110 mm (4.3 in) stroke producing 66 kW (89 hp). At the same time, the company introduced the first seven seater body.

1935 saw the ultimate development of the vehicle for luxury use. The standard vehicle by that time had a chassis with a 3.6 m (11 ft 10 in) wheelbase and was powered by a 66 kW (89 hp) engine. Praga mounted on this a luxurious new bodywork measuring 5.7 m (18 ft 8 in) in length. A mere handful of these were produced.

== Service ==
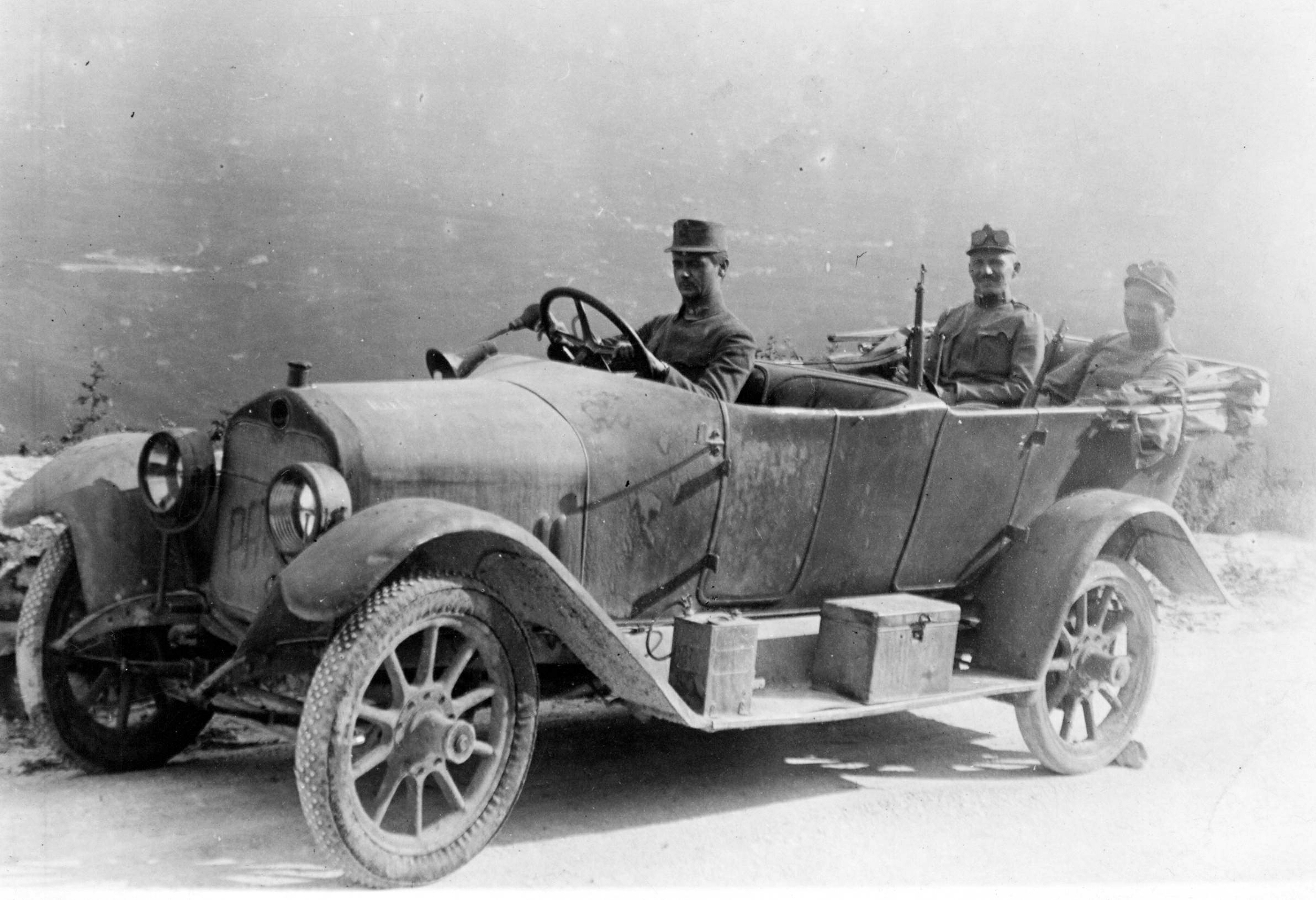
A Grand in Austrian service, 1914

The car proved itself early on, when three prototypes entered in an alpine race in 1912 achieved the top three places. After this, orders from the Austro-Hungarian Army were assured, and the car served as a staff car and ambulance in the force throughout World War I. 335 were produced before the end of the war and, at the end of the conflict, manufacturing resumed in 1919. Nearly four hundred more were sold between 1919 and 1926. They saw some success in post-war Alpine races.

With the creation of Czechoslovakia after the war, the Grand was the vehicle of choice for the new president, Tomáš Garrigue Masaryk. The Grand was popular with the rich, and it had a price tag to match. According to the 1925 price list, a basic vehicle cost 89,000 CSK, with an open-top phaeton priced at 115,000 CSK and the limousine 135,000 CSK.

With the introduction of the eight-cylinder engine in 1927, the car gained even more prestige and was termed the Rolls-Royce of Czechoslovakia. The car was particularly well received after its 1931 update, with motoring journalist Denik Národní calling it the favoured vehicle of the Czechoslovak elite ("oblíbeným vozeme vybrané československe společností"). The last example to be used as a presidential carriage was a 1935 limousine presented to Masaryk by his successor Edvard Beneš.

== Production ==
A total of 1,196 vehicles were produced, of which 897 had four-cylinder engines, with 299, the later model, with an eight-cylinder engine. The car was also produced in small numbers under license by Magyar Wagon in Hungary as the Rába Grand, both before and after World War I. The chassis was also used as the basis for fire engines and ambulances for civil and military service.
