= Relocation of Serbian industry during the Informbiro period =

Strategy of the government of the Socialist Federal Republic of Yugoslavia

The moving of the Serbian industry to western Yugoslav republics was a strategy of the government of the Federal People's Republic of Yugoslavia to conduct massive transfer of industrial plants, machinery, technology and experts from PR Serbia to the western republics of Yugoslavia (primarily PR Croatia and PR Slovenia) during the Informbiro period (1948—1952) and shortly after it. In some cases, only parts of industrial plants were moved while in others the whole factories were dismounted and transported out of Serbia. Since the ratio of highly educated people was very low at that time, moving experts out of Serbia had substantial negative consequences for its future development.

The Yugoslav communist leadership, supported by Slovene and Croatian communists, used expected Soviet invasion as an official explanation for this project while Serbian and Montenegrin communists argued against it. The Slovene and Croatian side argued that their republics' substantially higher level of average academic achievement and education among urban population of PR Slovenia and PR Croatia at the time would make it easier to find additional skilled workers than in PR Serbia or likewise replace existing Serbian ones if necessary. According to a CIA report, Josip Broz Tito supported Slovenian and Croatian communists. The number of factories moved from Serbia to western Yugoslav republics is between 70 and 76, according to texts published in contemporary media. The destination of moved Serbian industry were primarily the republics of Croatia and Slovenia, followed by Bosnia and Herzegovina and Montenegro, while some industry ended up in Albania.

The moved industry included aircraft production and heavy vehicle production.

Since many new destinations for the Serbian industry were much closer to Soviet-controlled territories, i.e. Maribor in Slovenia or Varaždin in Croatia, than their original locations in Serbia, many authors concluded that the real reason for moving Serbian industries out of Serbia was not fear of Soviet invasion but communist intention to punish Serbian nationalists for their rhetoric and aspiration of reforming Yugoslavia as a Greater Serbian state.

== Background ==
After the Partisans took over control of Serbia after WWII, they moved numerous factories from Serbia to other parts of Yugoslavia. The communists cited the Resolution of the Informbirou as the reasoning.

The followers of Informbiro were from the ranks of Montenegrins, Serbs in Bosnia and Serbia proper, and in a smaller extent Croats and Slovenians. According to some sources the real reason was not to prevent those factories to fall in hands of Soviet enemies, but to punish Serbia for "Greater Serbian nationalism" by causing major economic damage to it. Using old communist prejudices about privileged position of Serbia within Kingdom of Yugoslavia were among the reasons for Serbia, to be programmed for the slowest industrial development. Although some industries were moved to Serbia from other republics, the balance shows that 43% industry moved out of Serbia more than moved into Serbia.

CIA reported that plan of Yugoslav leaders to move factories from Serbia to Slovenia, supported by Slovenian and Croatian communists, met opposition of Serb and Montenegrin communists and that Tito supported Slovenian and Croatian communists.

== Aircraft industry ==
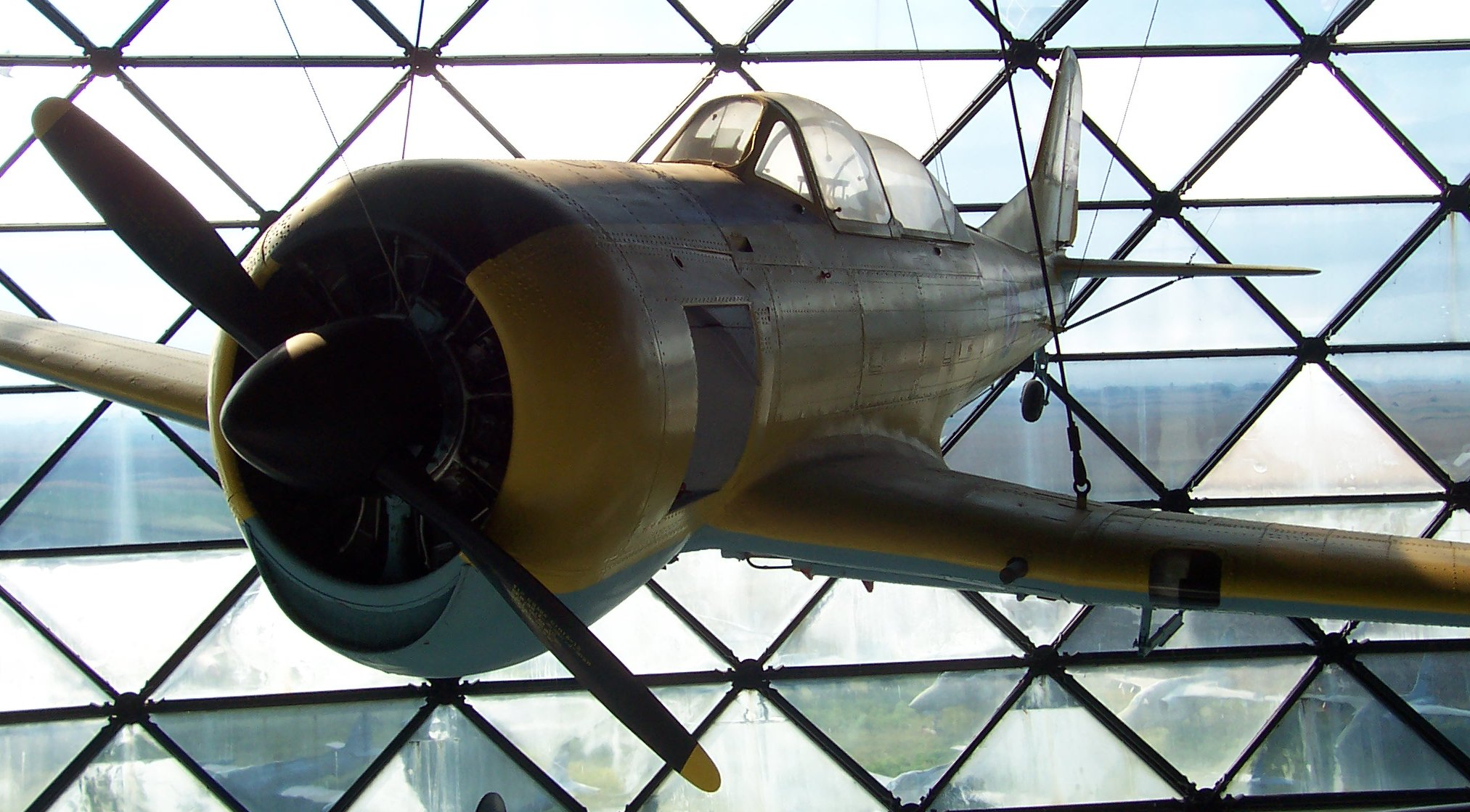
A preserved Soko 522 (initially produced by Ikarus) exhibited at the Museum of Aviation in Belgrade.

The Ikarus, the first Serbian industry of airplanes, automobiles and machines was moved from Belgrade to Mostar, Bosnia and Herzegovina. A new factory was established in Mostar using machinery brought from Ikarus. Its name was Soko. The communist authorities moved from Belgrade to Mostar both machines and the best skilled experts and technicians who knew how to operate and maintain the machines. Soko was considered as informal successor of Ikarus. Some experts who worked in Ikarus presented their opposition to the moving and destruction of the aviation program of company who had such substantial tradition in it.

Prva Petoletka, Trstenik, Serbia had complete line for production of fighter aircraft received from German war reparations in late 1949's. The complete airplane production program of the Prva Petoletka, Trstenik, Serbia was also moved to Soko in Mostar.

== Other industries ==
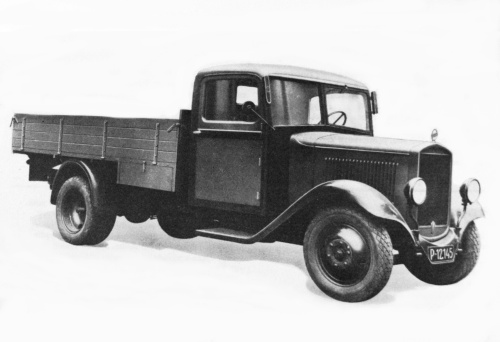
Production of the heavy truck Praga RN was moved from IMR in Serbia to TAM in Slovenia

Most of the factory Jugoalat from Novi Sad, Serbia which was specialized in production of tools was moved to Trebinje, Bosnia and Herzegovina, while foundry Partizan, Subotica, Serbia was moved to Sarajevo in 300 railway wagons. After the WWII communists nationalized Zavod Aleksandar Ranković (ZAR) in Belgrade and renamed it to Industrija Motora Rakovica (IMR). Since 1938 this factory produced trucks Praga RN according to license bought by ZAR from Praga. Based on the order of Yugoslav Ministry for heavy industry after the WWII Belgrade truck producer IMR had to give complete technical documentations, manufacturing tools and acquired know-how to Slovenian producer Tovarna avtomobilov Maribor in Maribor.

== Consequences ==
In a period which was very important for laying fundaments for future industrial development of the republics, the share of Serbia in Yugoslav industrial production was reduced for 13,8% The moving of factories from Serbia to northwestern parts of Yugoslavia was one of the main reasons for Serbia to become less developed in comparison to Slovenia and Croatia, i.e. in 1947 Slovenia had 67% stronger economy than Serbia while in 1987 the ratio in favor of Slovenia grew to 254%.

== Aftermath ==
On 24 July 1991 the Assembly of Serbia adopted a recommendation to stop the glorification of communist leaders who were responsible for damaging Serbia's economy through moving its factories to other parts of Yugoslavia and other political measures which damaged people of Serbia in past decades of communist rule. In the early 1990s this move of factories from Serbia was presented in school geography textbooks for 8th grade. Dubravka Stojanović believed that the motive to put such texts in school textbooks was to present arguments that Serbia and Serbs were exploited and subordinated in Yugoslavia, with final aim to create psychological basis for the war. In 2010 Boris Dežulović published text about moving factories from Serbia emphasizing that main destination of Serbian factories were not Slovenia and Croatia, but Bosnia and Herzegovina. In his text titled "Serbian industry goes home" Dežulović ridiculed with situation that many impoverished Serb workers whose factories were taken away from Serbia to western Yugoslav republics after WWII are now cheap labor for some contemporary Croatian and Slovenian entrepreneurs who moved their production plants to Serbia in the 2010s.

In 2013 Oliver Antić, Serbian high representative in the Commission of Succession of Former Yugoslavia, stated that it is necessary to consider part of industries moved out of Serbia into succession agreements.

== Analysis ==
According to some sources the real reason was not to prevent those factories to fall in hands of Soviet enemies, but to punish Serbia for "Greater Serbian nationalism" by causing major economic damage to it. The arguments brought by those sources are:

1. After the danger of Soviet invasion passed, the industry has not been returned to Serbia or compensated in any way
2. The moving of industry out of Serbia continued even after the danger of Soviet invasion passed
3. There was no similar moving of industry out of Slovenia or Croatia during the crisis connected to Free Territory of Trieste or after the crisis because of the shooting two US airplanes in Slovenia in 1946
4. During the period of moving industry out of Serbia there was also a ban on industry investments valid only for the northern Serbian province of Vojvodina
5. Moving production to ill-prepared locations resulted in difficulties of maintaining continuous production and quality
6. The first five-year plan of economical development in Yugoslavia projected slower development and lower investment in industry of Serbia

Using old communist prejudices about privileged position of Serbia within Kingdom of Yugoslavia were among the reasons for Serbia, along with Slovenia, to be programmed for the slowest industrial development. Although some industries were moved to Serbia from other republics, the balance shows that 43% industry moved out of Serbia more than moved into Serbia.

Other sources say that the moving of industry was used by the SANU and media campaigns aimed at proving the difficult situation of Serbia and the Serbs in Yugoslavia and creating an image of their vulnerability and subordination, with final aim to create psychological basis for the war. These are included in school textbooks.

In 2010, Boris Dežulović published an eassy about the topic in which he emphasized that the main destination of Serbian factories were not Slovenia and Croatia, but Bosnia and Herzegovina. In his text titled "Serbian industry goes home" Dežulović ridiculed with situation that many impoverished Serb workers whose factories were taken away from Serbia to western Yugoslav republics after WWII are now cheap labor for some contemporary Croatian and Slovenian entrepreneurs who moved their production plants to Serbia in the 2010s.

== See also ==
- List of companies of the Socialist Federal Republic of Yugoslavia

== Sources ==
- Žutić, Nikola (2002). Histoire du vingtième siècle. Institut za savremenu istoriju.
- Radovanović, Jovan (2010). Moje polemike. Sanimex. ISBN 9788684073305.
- Jovanović, Batrić (2003). Rasrbljivanje Crnogoraca: Staljinov i Titov zločin. Srpska školska knj. ISBN 9788683565115.
