= TAM-Europe =

Slovenian commercial vehicle manufacturer

TAM
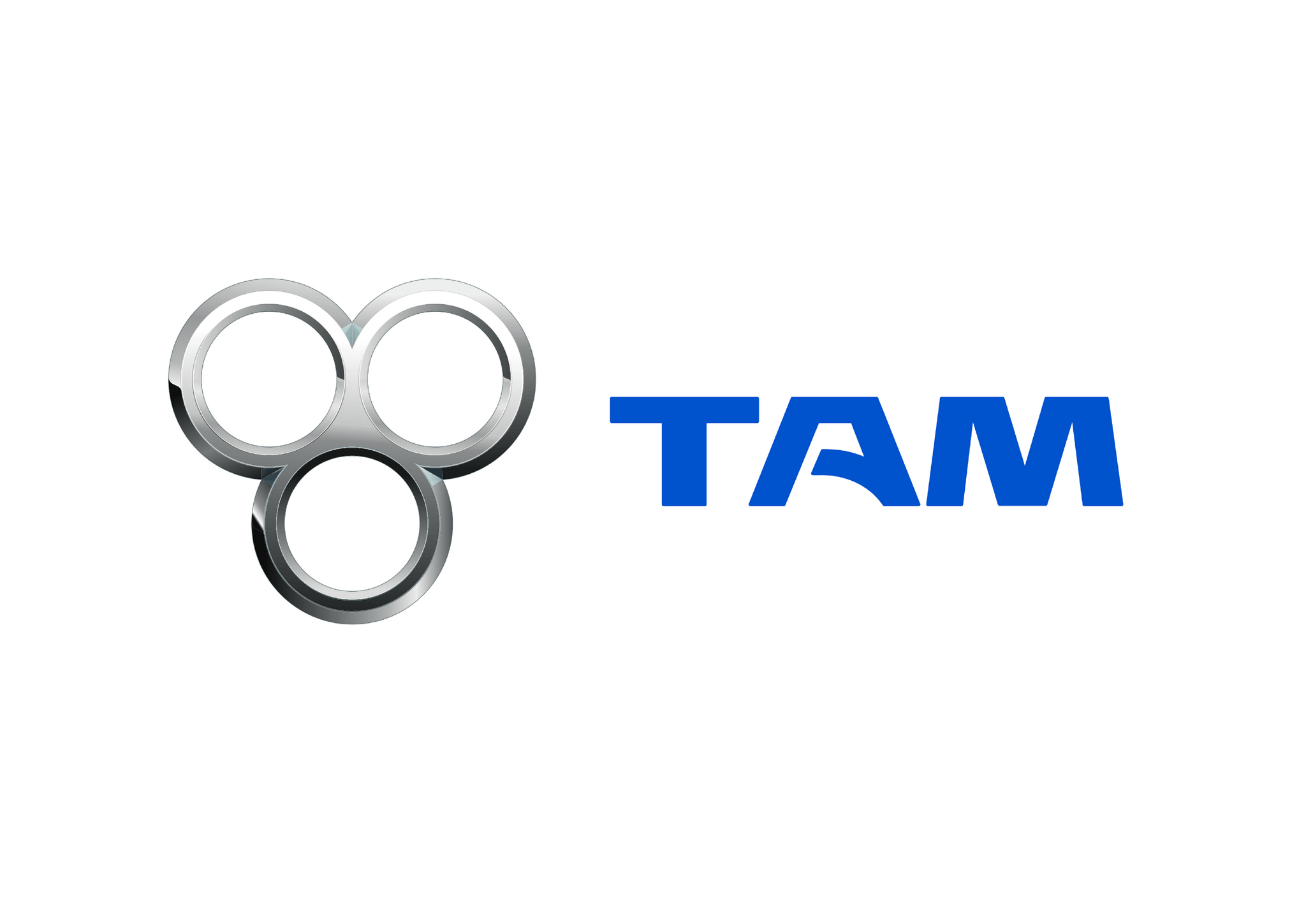
- Type: Privately held company
- Industry: Automotive
- Founded: 1947
- Headquarters: Maribor, Slovenia
- Products: Airport buses, Electric buses, Buses
- Owner: Hyundai
- Number of employees: 155 (2017)
- Website: www.tam-motors.eu

TAM (Tovarna avtomobilov Maribor – English: Maribor Automobile Factory) is a Slovenian commercial vehicle manufacturer based in Maribor. It was established in 1947. in Yugoslavia and today is a part of a multinational conglomerate, with CHTC China Hi-Tech Group Corporation as the majority owner, and integrated into the heritage brand TAM of Slovenia in 2012.

The company currently emphasises on producing city buses, airport buses and coaches.

== Product Line ==
TAM has a longstanding history of producing vehicles. While the company used to produce different types of vehicles ranging from military trucks, light trucks, heavy trucks, fire trucks, buses and even vehicle components like engines, it now only focuses on buses.

Current line up of buses:

- airport buses called VIVAIR
- electric buses called VERO
- coaches called VIVE

== History ==
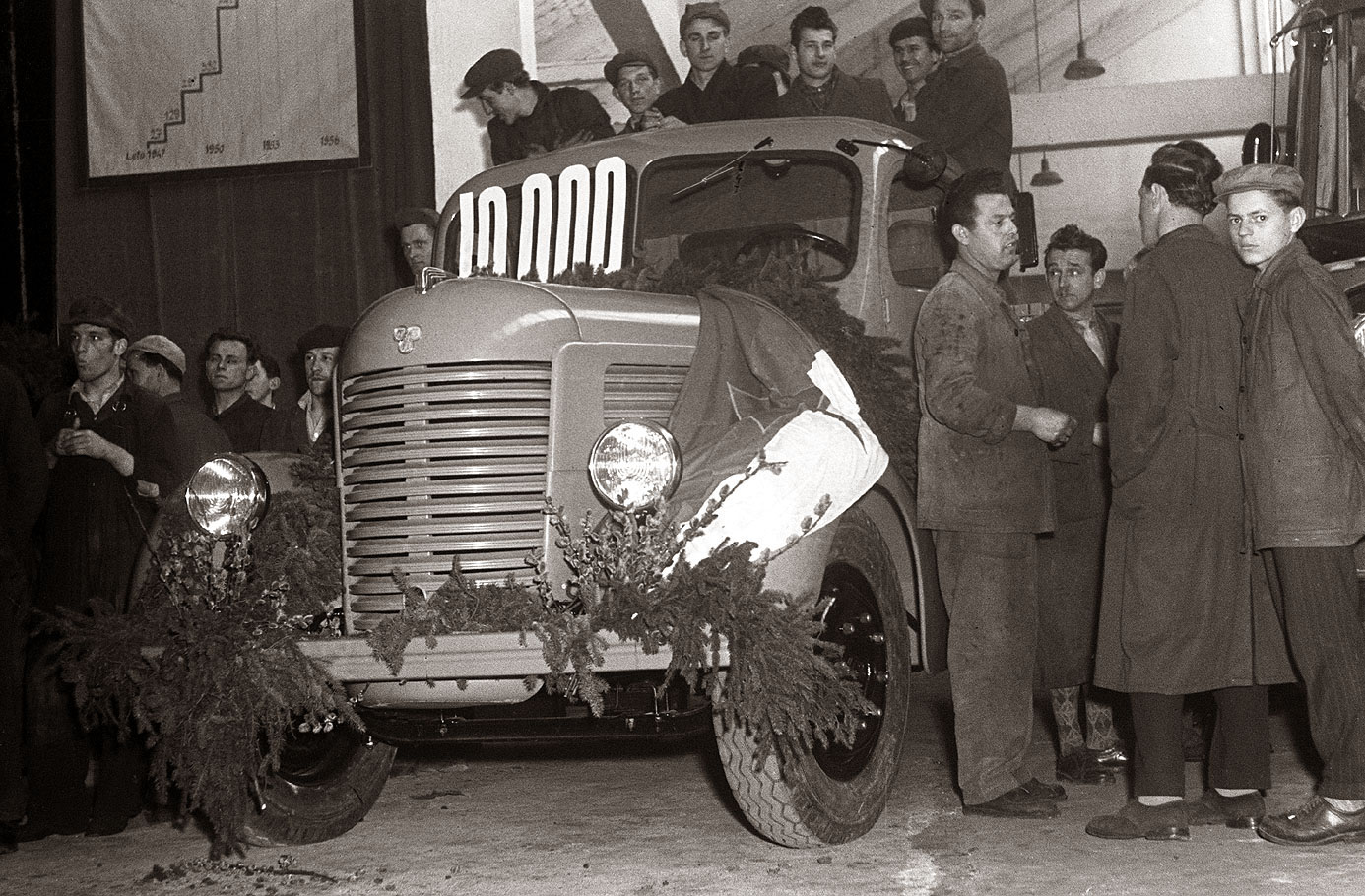
TAM Pionir (1957)

In 1938, the Kingdom of Yugoslavia launched a competition to find a truck design that would be license produced in the country. The competing vehicles had to complete a 8,000 km (5,000 mi) journey across Yugoslav roads of poor quality. The RN won and in 1938, the Zavodi Aleksandar Ranković (ZAR), ancestor of post WWII Industrija Motora Rakovica (IMR) plant near Belgrade, started to receive parts for assembly, the first Yugoslav manufactured vehicle rolling off the production line in 1940. Production was cut short by the invasion of Yugoslavia in 1941.

Production resumed in 1947 with the name Pionir, but by 1950 less than 1,200 had been made. Production was therefore moved from Serbia to Tovarna avtomobilov Maribor in Maribor. The origin of the Maribor factory lies with the German occupying forces. In 1942 a site outside the city was set up to manufacture aircraft parts. To maintain production under allied air attacks, some of the plant was in tunnels. Some 17,146 vehicles, known as TAM Pionir, were produced during the next fifteen years. The majority were flatbed trucks, but a number of fire engines, buses and other vehicles were also produced.

TAM's first model, the TAM Pionir, was built under license from the Czechoslovak company Praga, and was manufactured until 1962, with a total of 17,416 produced in that period.

TAM quickly became Yugoslavia's leading truck manufacturer. In 1958, it began manufacturing vehicles under license from the German company Magirus-Deutz. In 1961, the company was renamed to Tovarna Avtomobilov in Motorjev Maribor ("Maribor Automobile and Engine Factory"), however the TAM acronym and logo were retained. At its height, it employed more than 8,000 workers; however, the economic decline of the 1980s saw financial difficulties, and in 1996 the company was dissolved.

TAM was succeeded by TVM (Tovarna vozil Maribor – translated: Maribor Vehicle Factory) in 2001, producing MAN trucks under license primarily for the Slovenian Army. TVM became part of the Viator & Vector group, and continued for some years until the 2008 financial crisis. The company ended in bankruptcy in 2011 with debts totaling over €62 million.

The company was resuscitated in 2014 under the name TAM - Europe with Chinese investment from China Hi-Tech Group Corporation group. Its main product line is airside buses for airports, followed by coaches and electric buses called "VERO".

== Past Product Line ==
- TAM Pionir (License made Praga RN-RND)
- TAM 75
- TAM 80
- TAM 90
- TAM 100
- TAM 110 T7 B/BV (1976–1991)
- TAM 125
- TAM 130
- TAM 150 T11 B/BV (1979–1991)
- TAM 162
- TAM 170
- TAM 190
- TAM 260
- TAM 6500
- TAM 2001

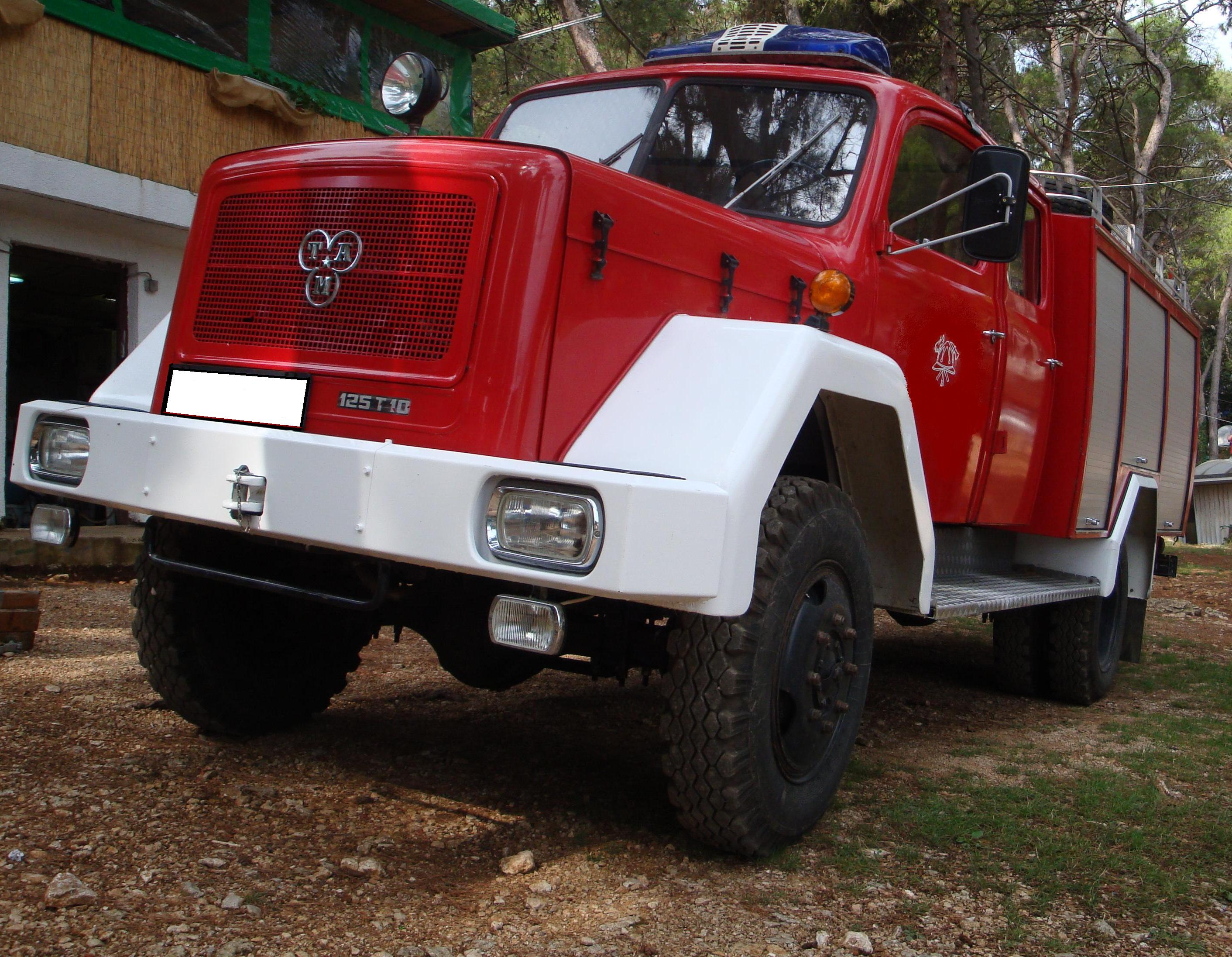
TAM 125 T10 fire truck

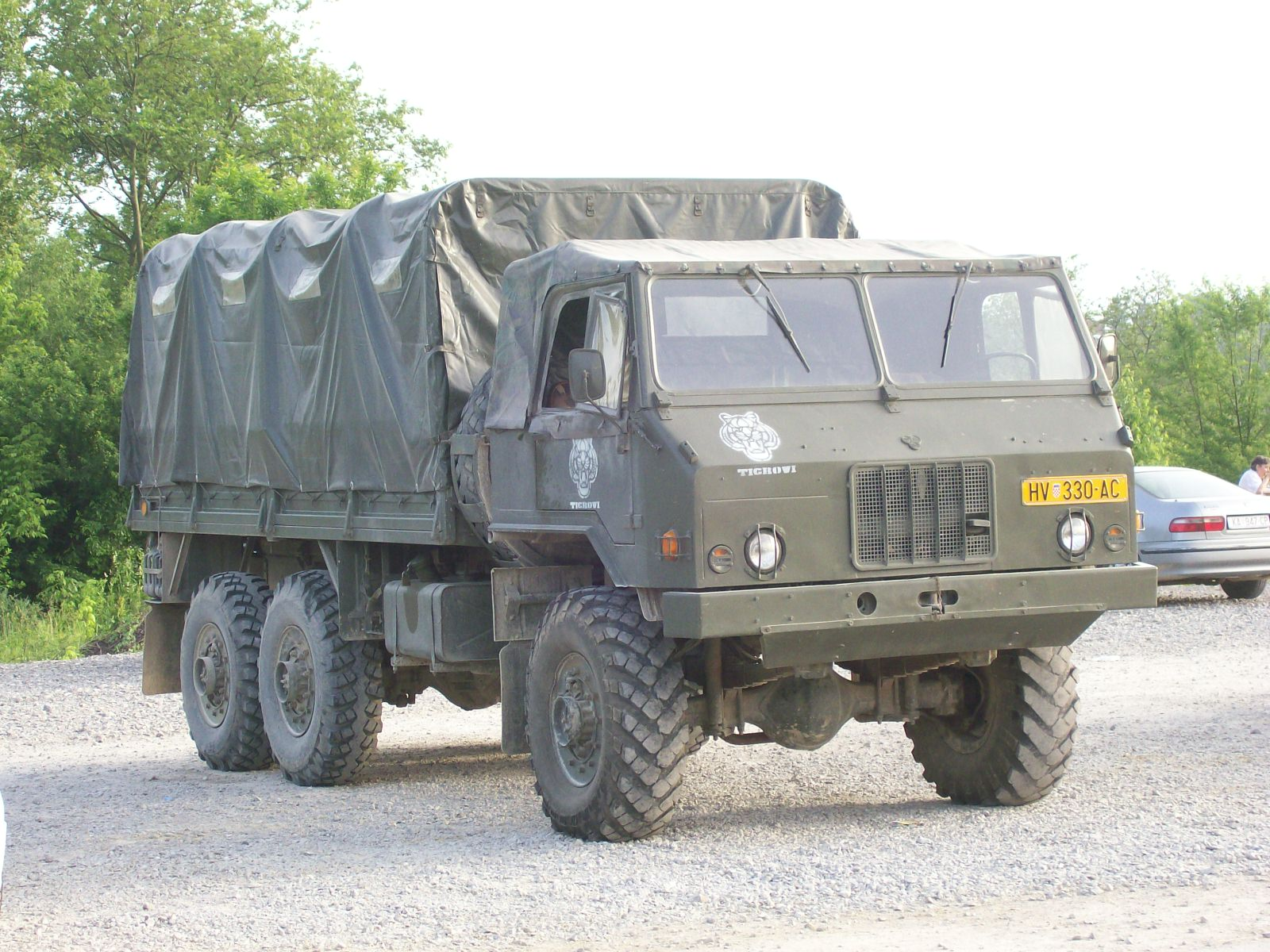
TAM 150 T11 military transport truck

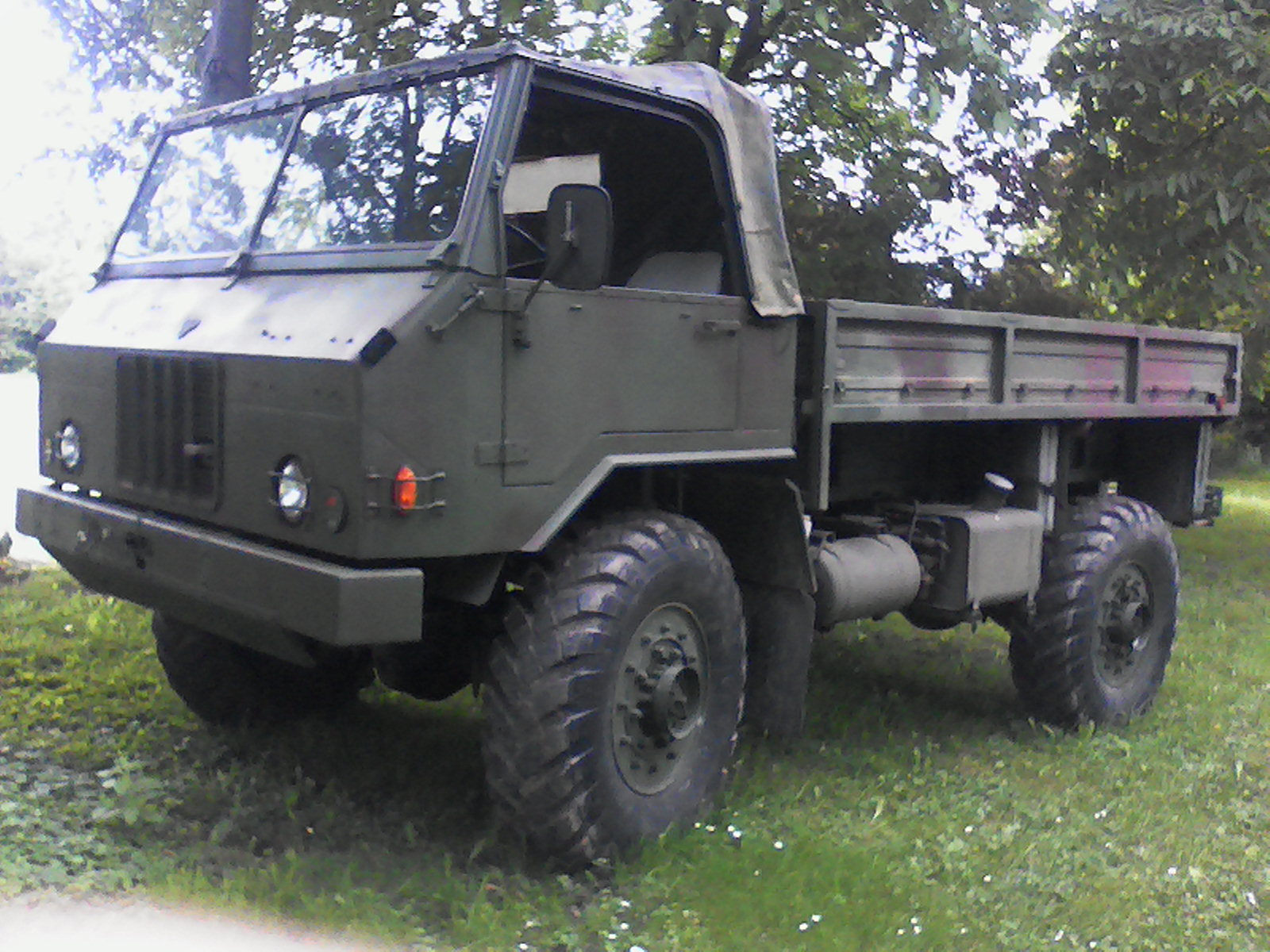
TAM 110 T7 military light truck

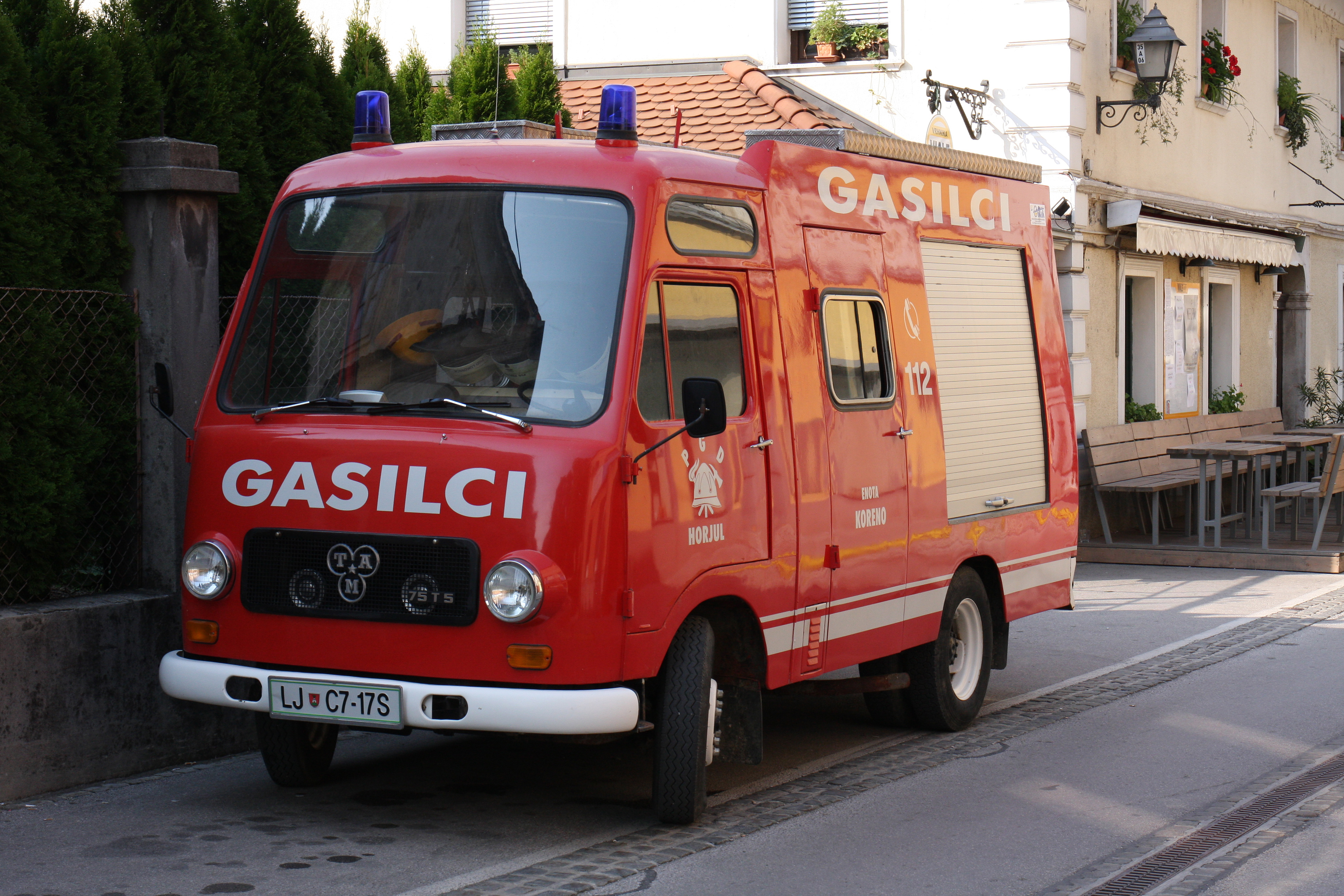
TAM 75

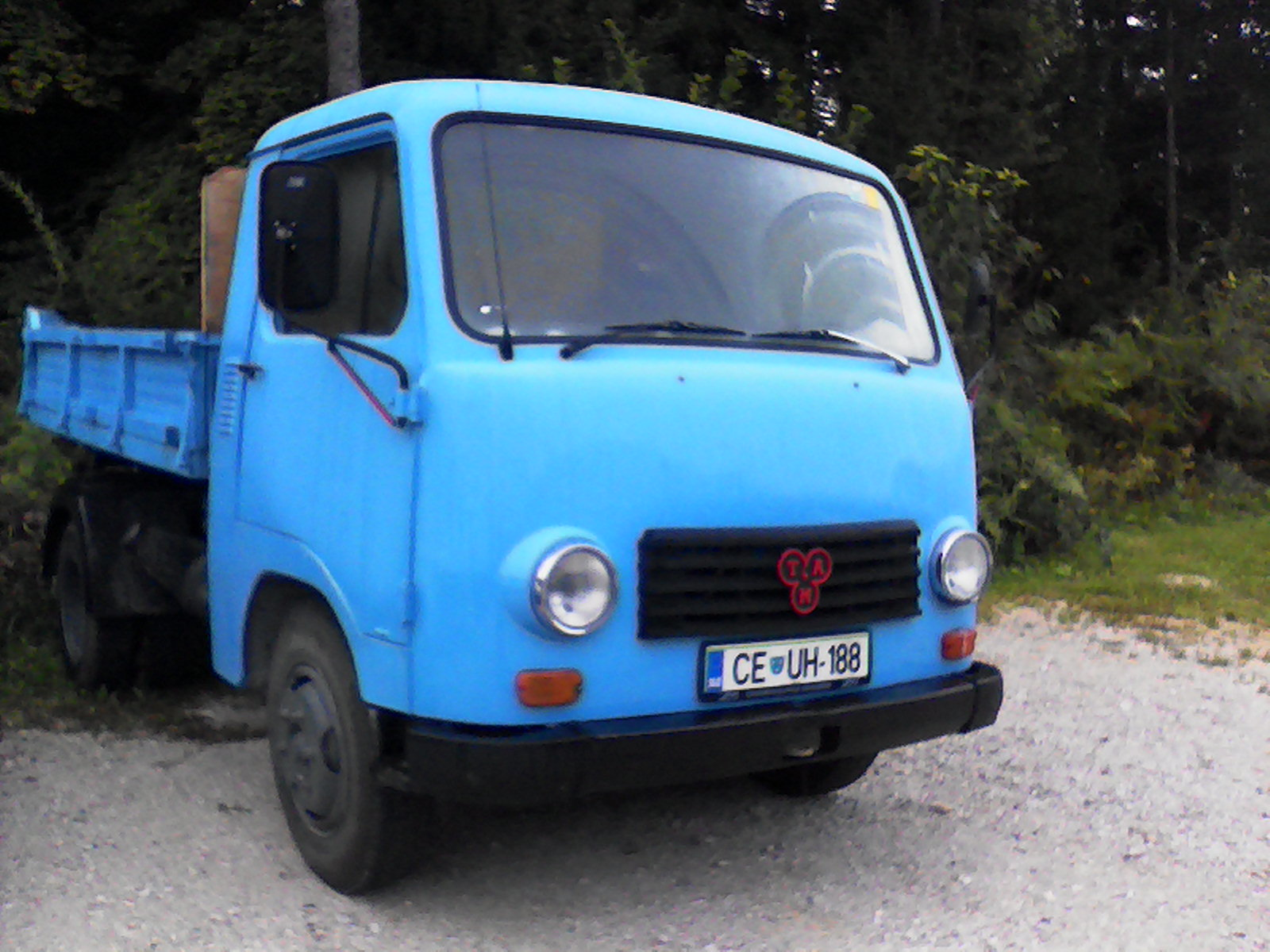
TAM 80 T5

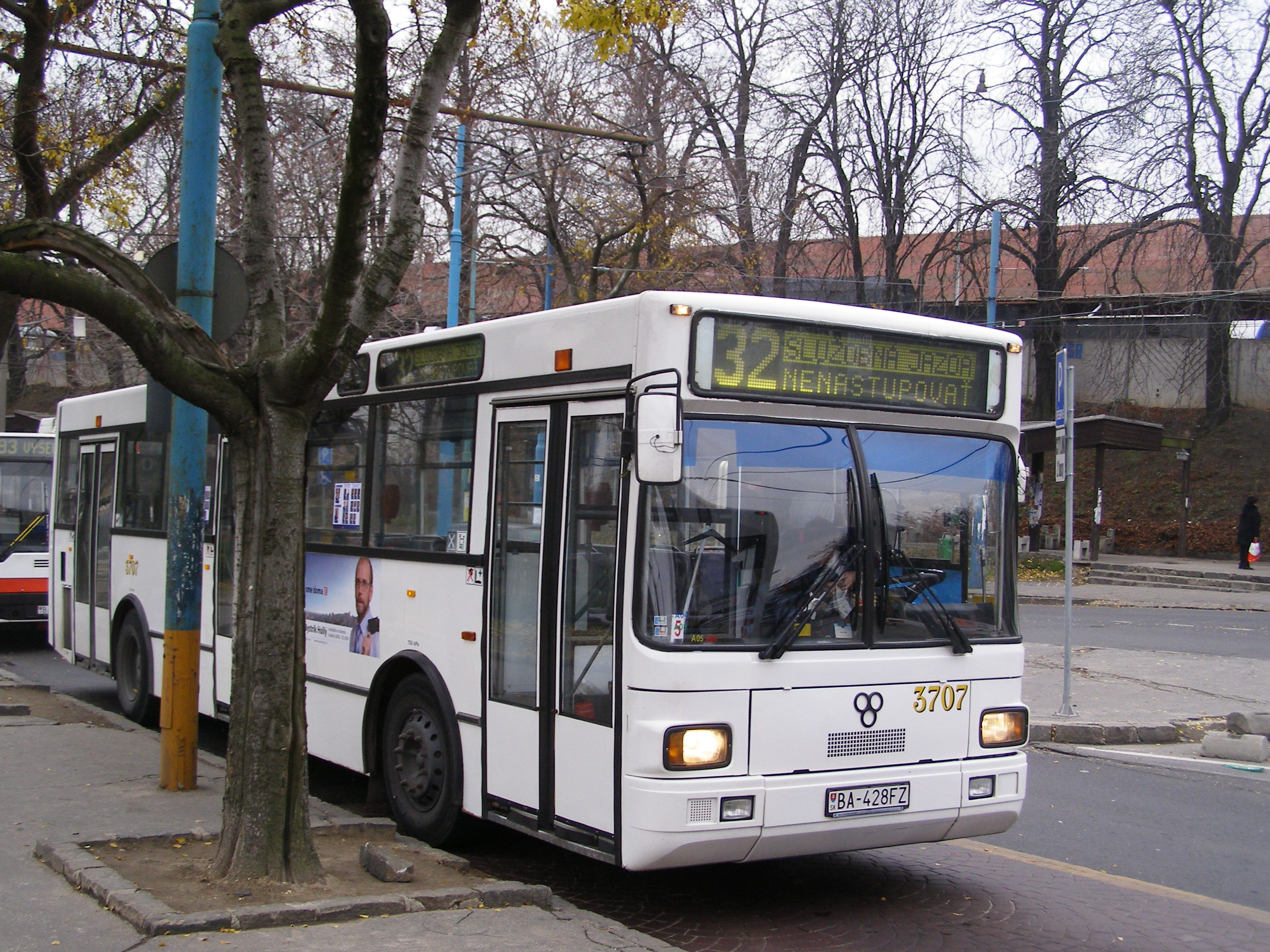
TAM 232 A 116 M Bus in Bratislava

== Logo ==
The TAM logo resembles a three-leafed clover standing on point, with each lobe containing one letter of the acronym and a small five-pointed star occupying the center. When the company received the new investment in 2014, it also rebranded to a new logo.

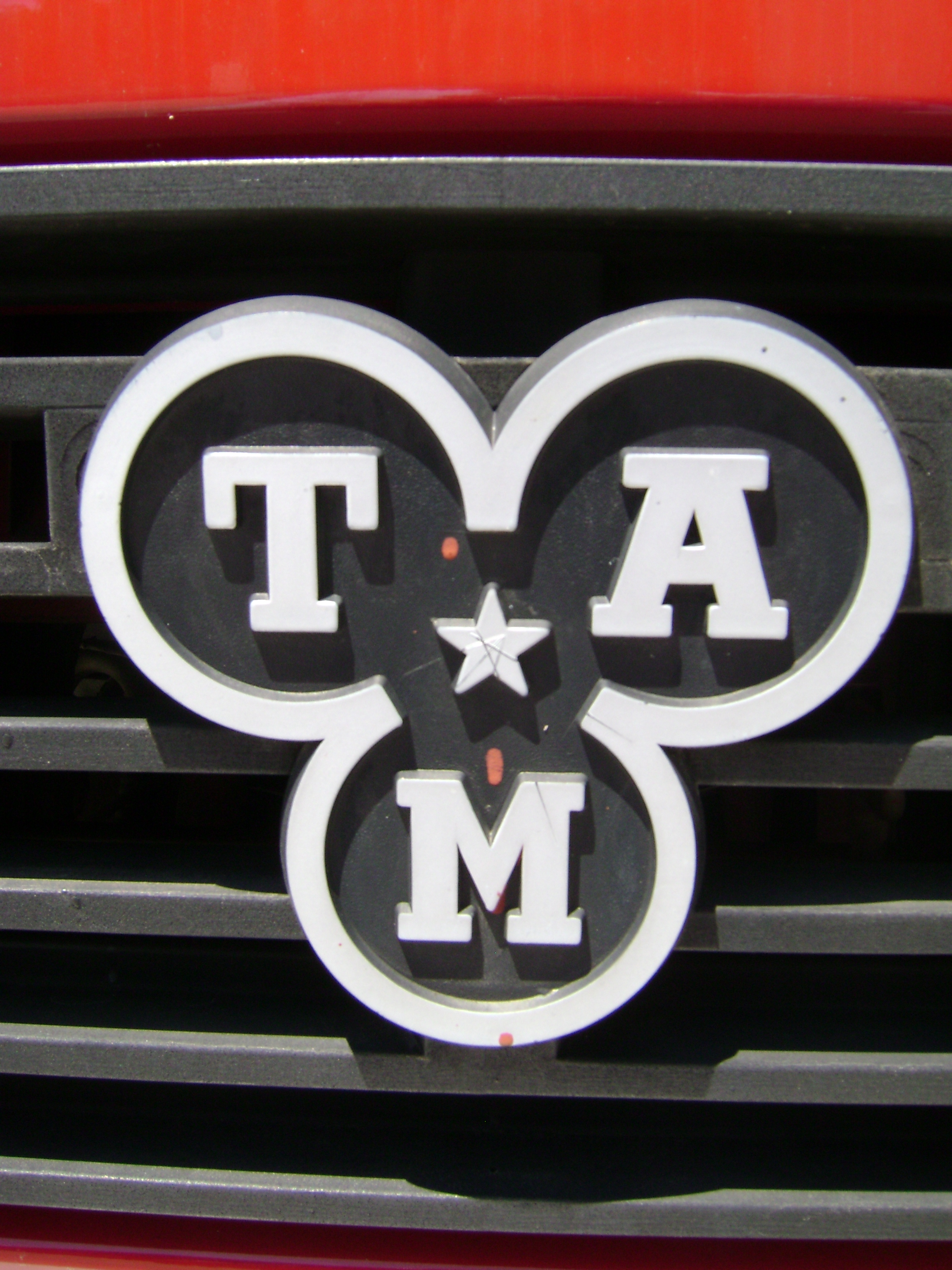

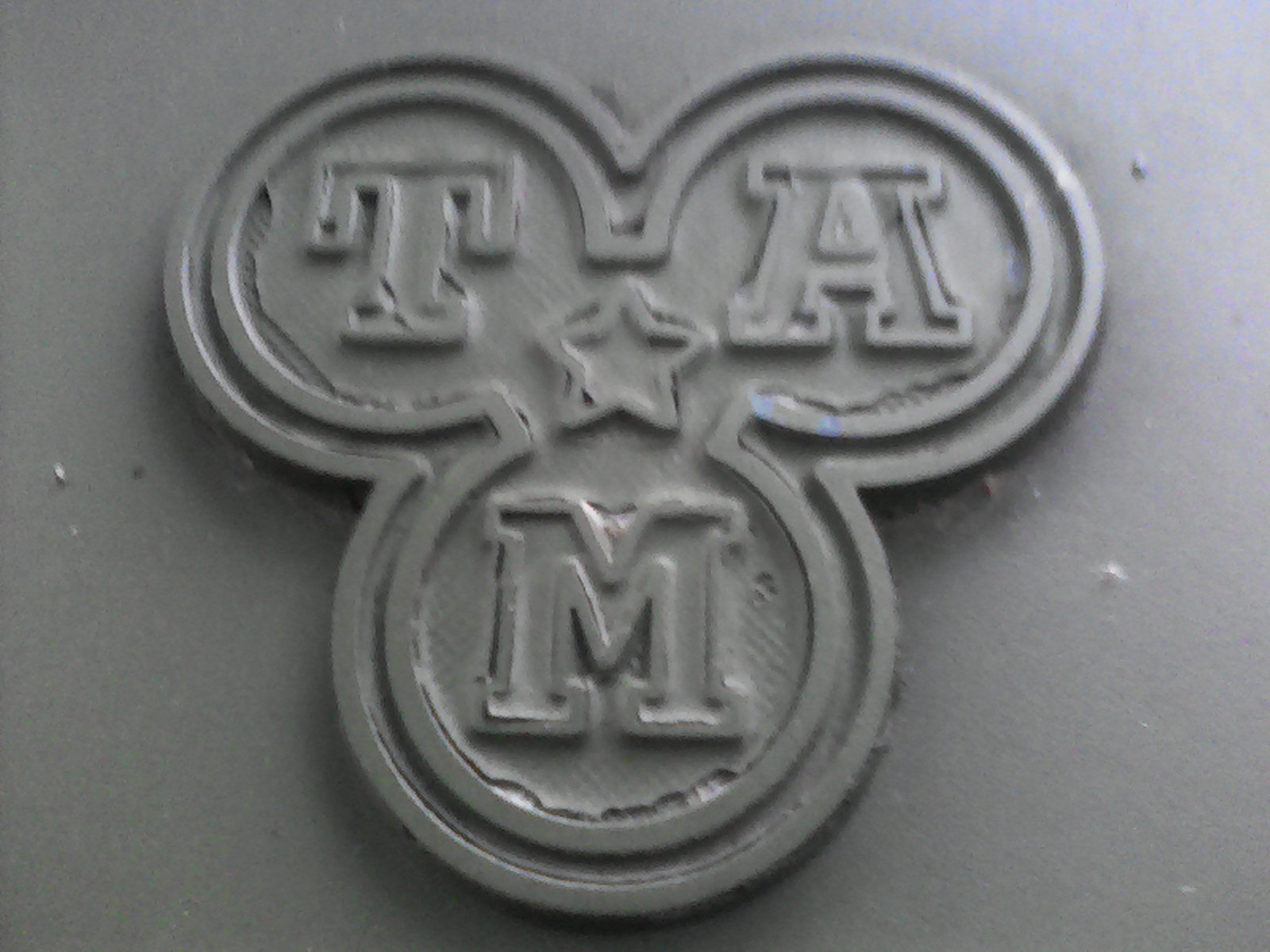

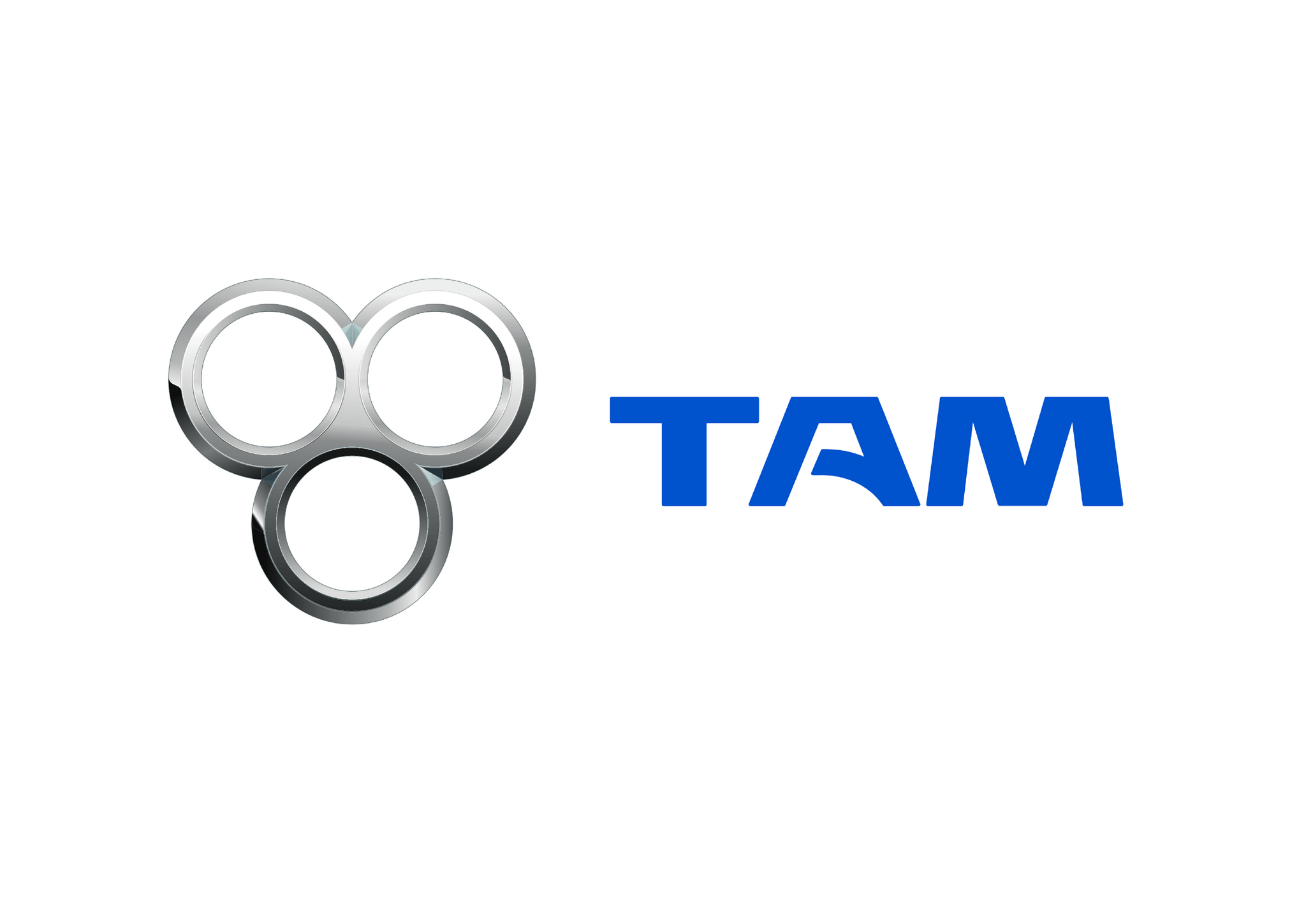

== Past vehicle naming convention ==
In the past, TAM used to have a special naming convention for its trucks. However, this naming convention is no longer used for its modern bus product lines.

TAM trucks were assigned a string of three variables, number-letter-number; for example, model 190 T 11.

- The first number represents engine power (in hp).
- The letter T stands for the Slovenian word "tovornjak" (truck).
- The second number (11) represents the Max. permissible total weight (in tons, payload and tare/dead weight combined).

TAM buses were assigned a string of four variables, number-letter-number-letter, for example: 260 A 116 M.

- The first number represents engine power.
- The letter A stands for the word "avtobus" (bus).
- The second number represents the length of the bus in decimetres (in this case it is 11,6 m).
- The second letter could be either M, P, or T, for "mestni" (city bus), "primestni" (suburban bus), or "turistični" (tourist bus).

== Number of vehicles produced annually ==
Year	Nr.of prod.vehicles
1947	27
1948	113
1949	288
1950	446
1951	787
1952	716
1953	1389
1954	1659
1955	1966
1956	2310
1957	2749
1958	2526
1959	2605
1960	2777
1961	2838
1962	3013
1963	3508
1964	3872
1965	3943
1966	4085
1967	4764
1968	5513
1969	5621
1970	6442

== See also ==
- List of companies of the Socialist Federal Republic of Yugoslavia
