= TAM 110 T7 B/BV =

General purpose off-road lorry

TAM 110 T7
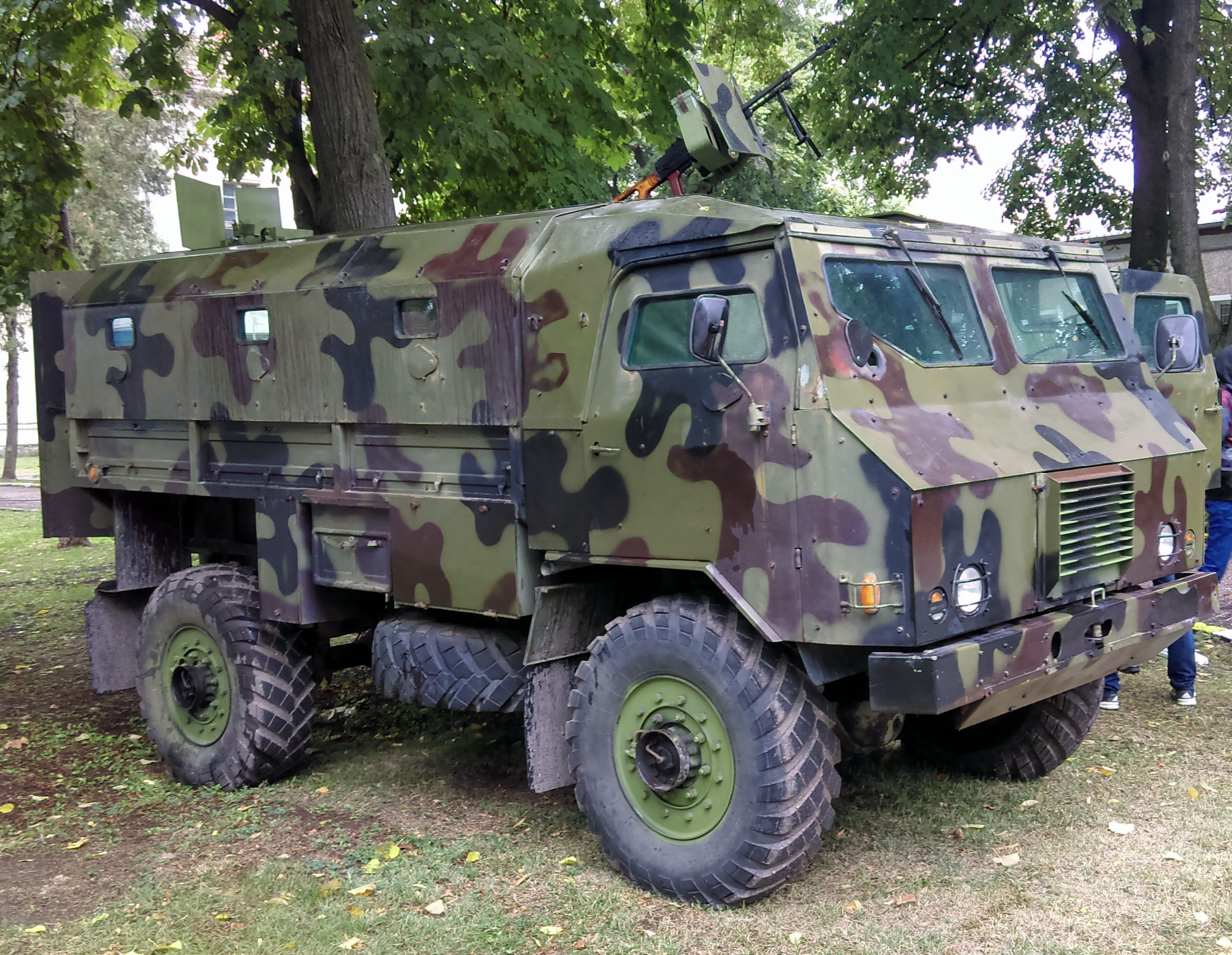

Overview
- Manufacturer: TAM
- Production: 1976–1991
- Designer: TAM

Body and chassis
- Class: 4x4 Utility, Transport Truck
- Body style: COE

Powertrain
- Engine: Deutz F 4L 413 FR
- Transmission: Z5-35 S

Dimensions
- Wheelbase: 2,850 mm (112.2 in)
- Length: 4,850 mm (190.9 in)
- Width: 2,270 mm (89.4 in)
- Height: 2,470 mm (97.2 in)
- Curb weight: 4,505 kg (9,932 lb)

Chronology
- Successor: TAM 150 T11 B/BV

TAM 110 T7 B/BV is a general purpose off-road lorry made by Yugoslav (today Slovenian) vehicle manufacturer Tovarna avtomobilov Maribor (TAM). The four-wheel drive lorry is designed for transport of personnel, weapons and material as for traction of weapons and trailer up to 2.5 tons of weight (1.5 off-road) for the needs of the Yugoslav People's Army.

== Development ==
During 1965 the Department for Traffic of Federal Secretariat of People's Defense has formed work group with task to analyzes the unarmored vehicles of Yugoslav People's Army. the result of work group was the Study of non-combat vehicles and trailers in use with Yugoslav People's Army. The inferences of study were adopted by Main Military Technical Council in 1966. The study has concluded that there are 129 different vehicle marks in 320 types in service. A decision was made to reduce number of different vehicle marks in service by development of five vehicle classes: 0,75 tons 4x4 off-road vehicle, 1.5 tons 4x4 off-road truck, 3 tons 6x6 off-road truck, 6 tons 6x6 off-road truck and 9 tons 8x8 heavy off-road truck.

During the 1976 the plan for 1.5 tons 4x4 off-road truck was realized by Tovarna avtomobilov Maribor with TAM 110 T7 B/BV. It was developed from Magirus-Deutz design.

The TAM 110 T7 B/BV was mass-produced for the needs of the Yugoslav People's Army from 1976 until 1991.

== Variants ==
The standard variant is with short cab with canvas and standard cargo bed. Used for transport of personnel (12 + 2 troops with equipment), materials and as tractor for light artillery and anti-aircraft artillery weapons.

The variant with hardtop cab is used for different bodyworks - mobile NBC laboratory (AL-RH), communications vehicle, ambulance (S-4), 4.5t mobile crane (HAK), platform for well drill (BMB), fire truck and minibus for 16 passengers.

Serbian army and Serbian Gendarmerie has several TAM 110 T7 B/BV trucks modified in to armored truck known as Ris (Lynx), and special vehicle for anti-riot operations.

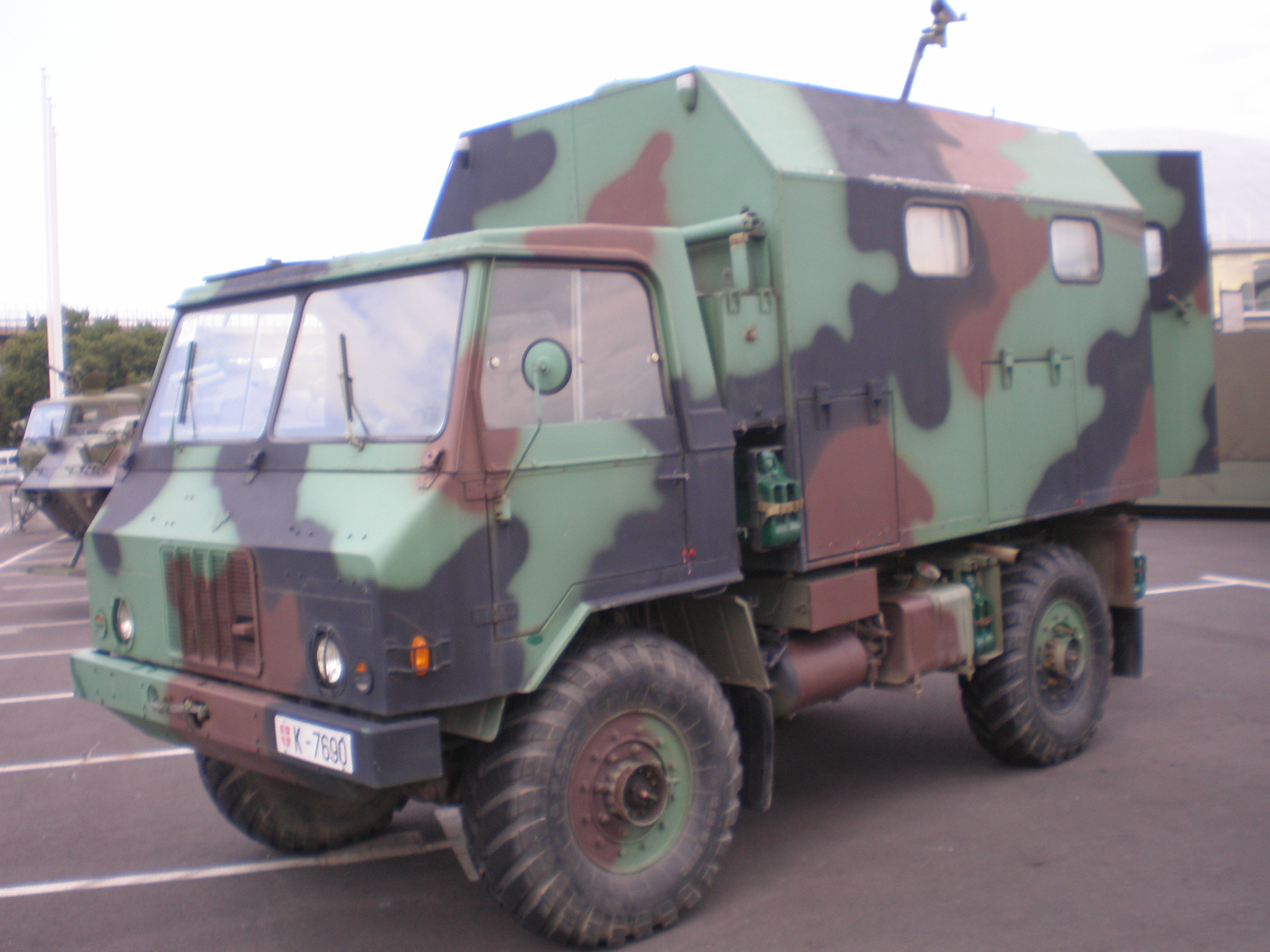
TAM 110 T7 B/BV AL-RH mobile NBC laboratory, Serbian Army.

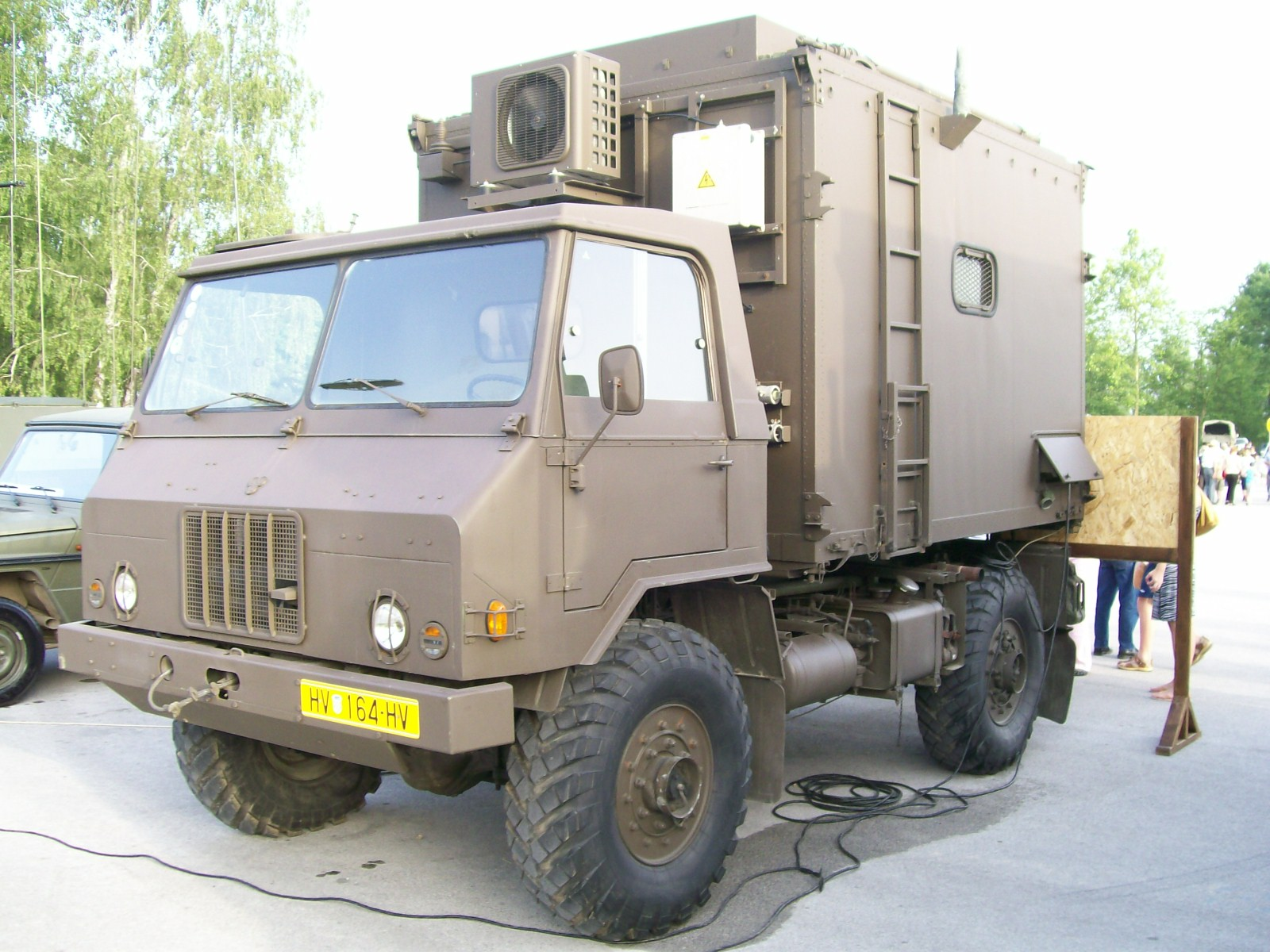
TAM 110 T7 B/BV communications vehicle, Croatian Army.

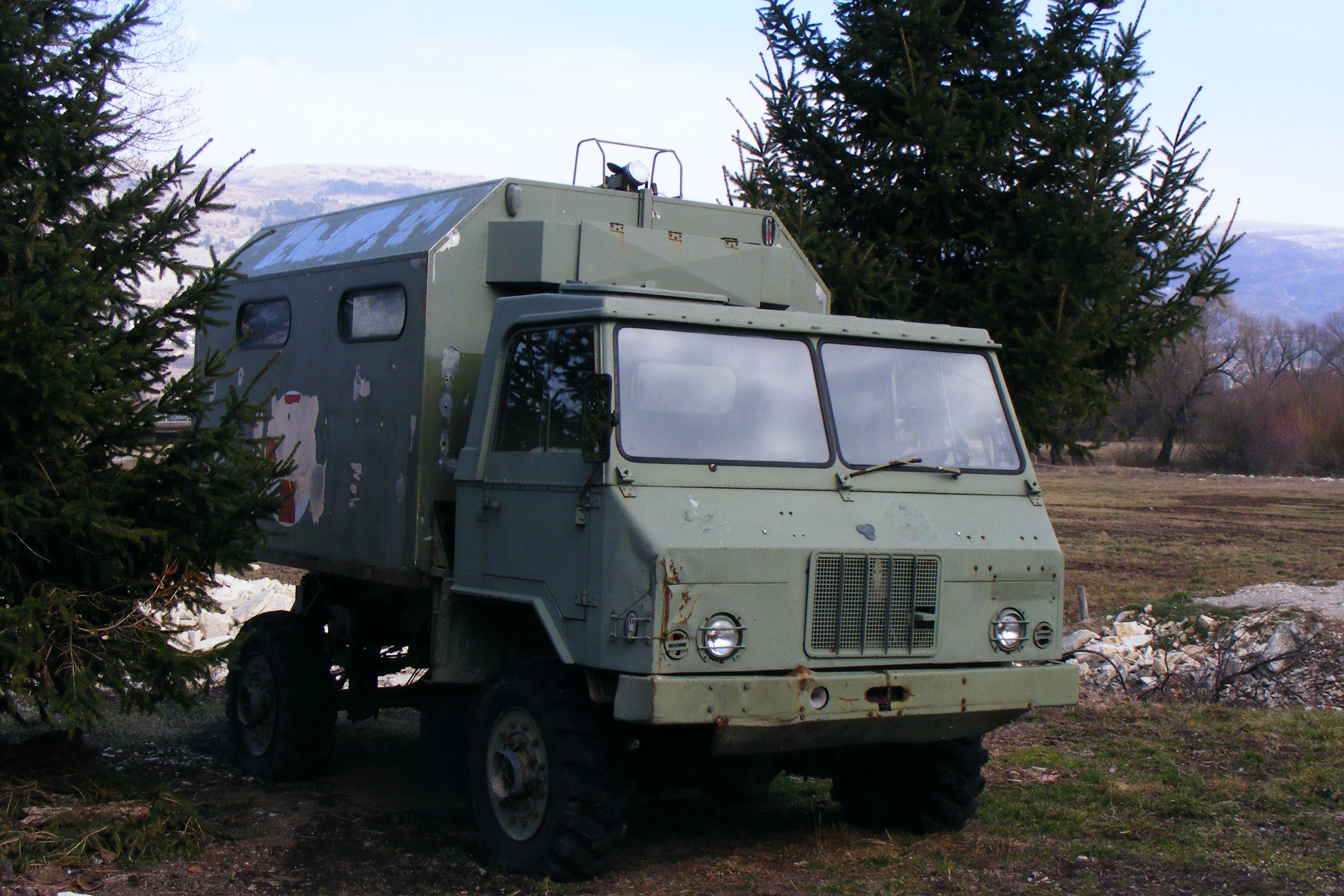
TAM 110 T7 B/BV S-4 ambulance vehicle of former Yugoslav People's Army.

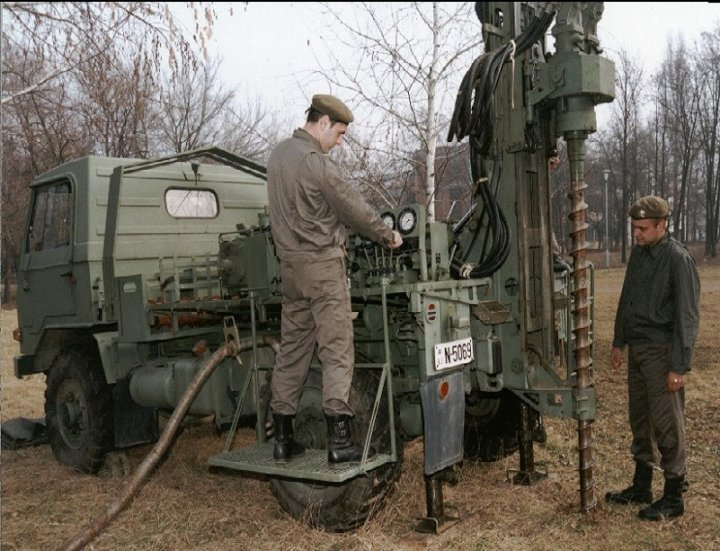
TAM 110 T7 B/BV as platform for well drill (BMB).

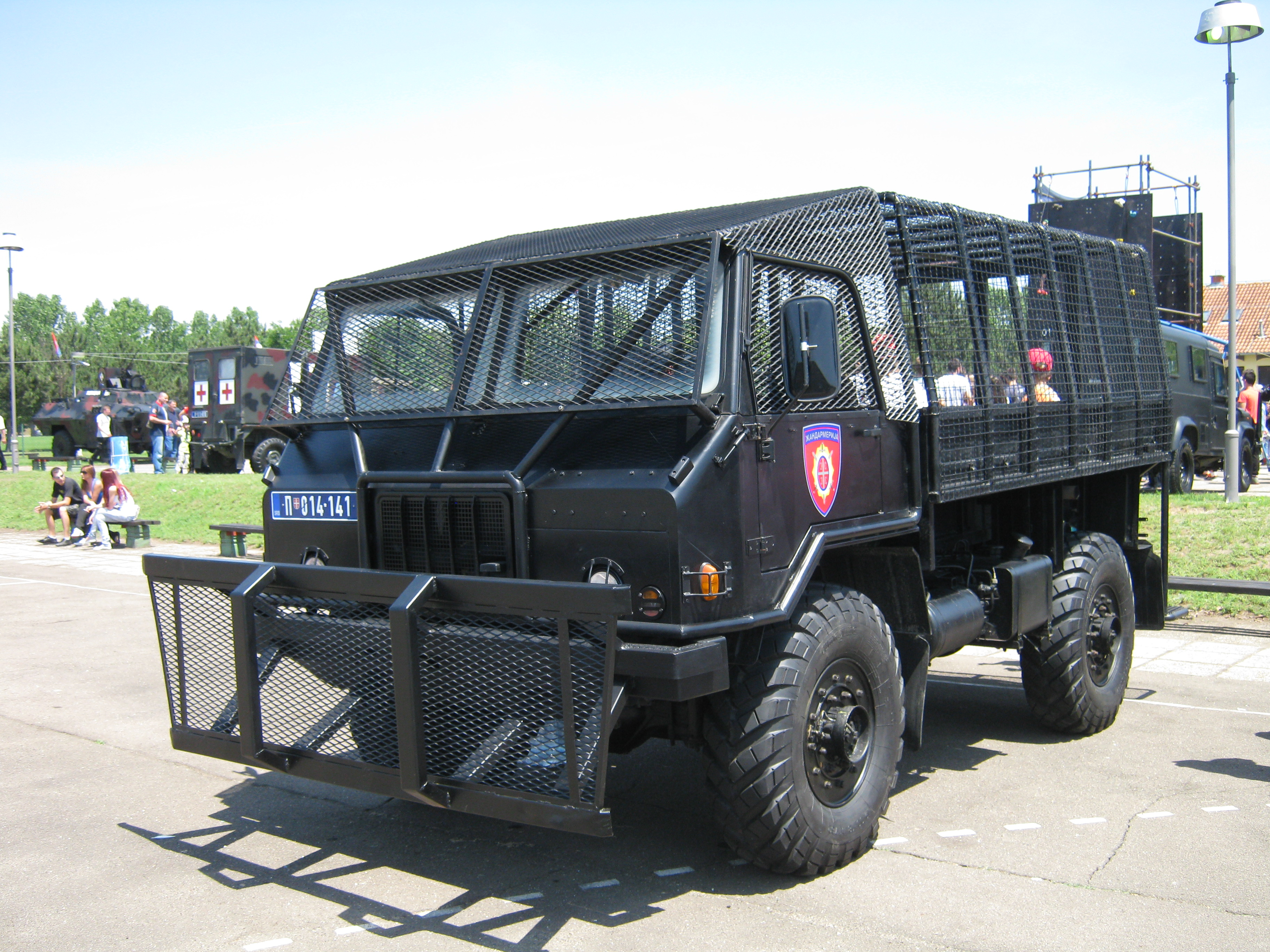
TAM 110 T7 B/BV used by the Serbian Gendarmery for riots.

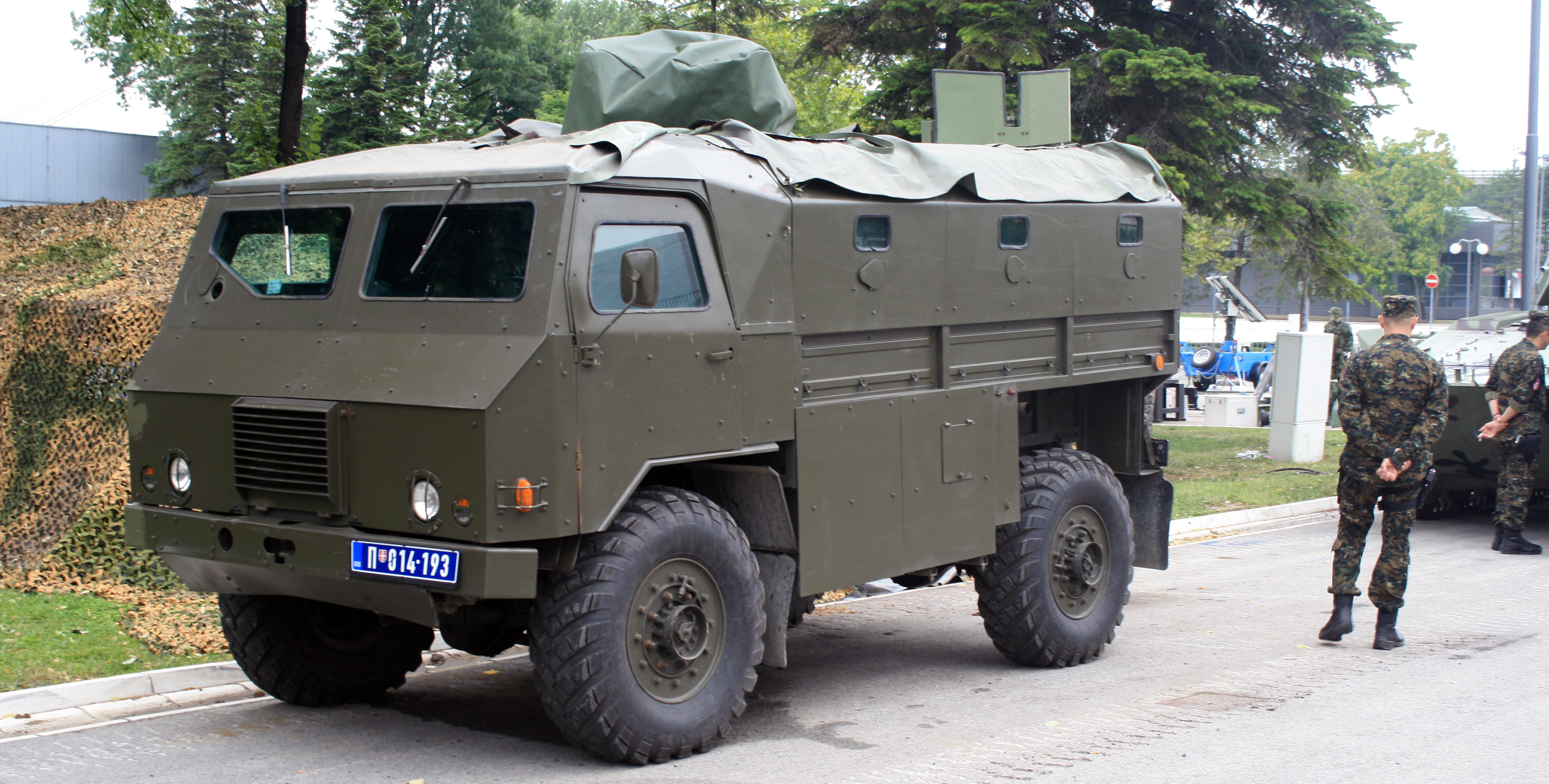
TAM 110 T7 B/BV Ris armored truck of the Serbian Gendarmery.

== Operators ==
TAM 110 T7 B/BV was mainly produced for the needs of the Yugoslav People's Army and milicija. Number of vehicles have been exported to several Middle Eastern countries during the 1980s. Saudi Arabia also imported those trucks for its army. After the breakup of Yugoslavia most vehicles were passed to successor states. Today TAM 110 T7 B/BV are used by militaries of Serbia, Slovenia, Croatia, Bosnia and Herzegovina, Republic of North Macedonia and Montenegro. It is also used by the Serbian Gendarmery.

== Technical data ==
=== Dimensions ===
- Length - 4850 mm
- Width - 2270 mm
- Height - 2470
- Height without roof and windshield - 1786 mm
- Wheelbase - 2850
- Cargo bed internal dimensions:
  - Length - 3020 mm
  - Width - 2120 mm
  - Height - 640

=== Weight ===
- Curb weight - 4505 kg
- Weight on-road - 1500 kg
- Weight off-road - 2500 kg
- Bodywork allowed weight - 2000 kg

=== Operating data ===
- Max speed - 90 km/h
- Speed on 6-8% ground slope - 28 km
- Maximum gradient - 67%

=== Engine ===
- Name - Deutz F 4L 413 FR
- Type - Diesel
- No. of cylinder - 4 in line
- Displacement - 6381 cm3
