= TAM 150 T11 B/BV =

TAM 150 T11
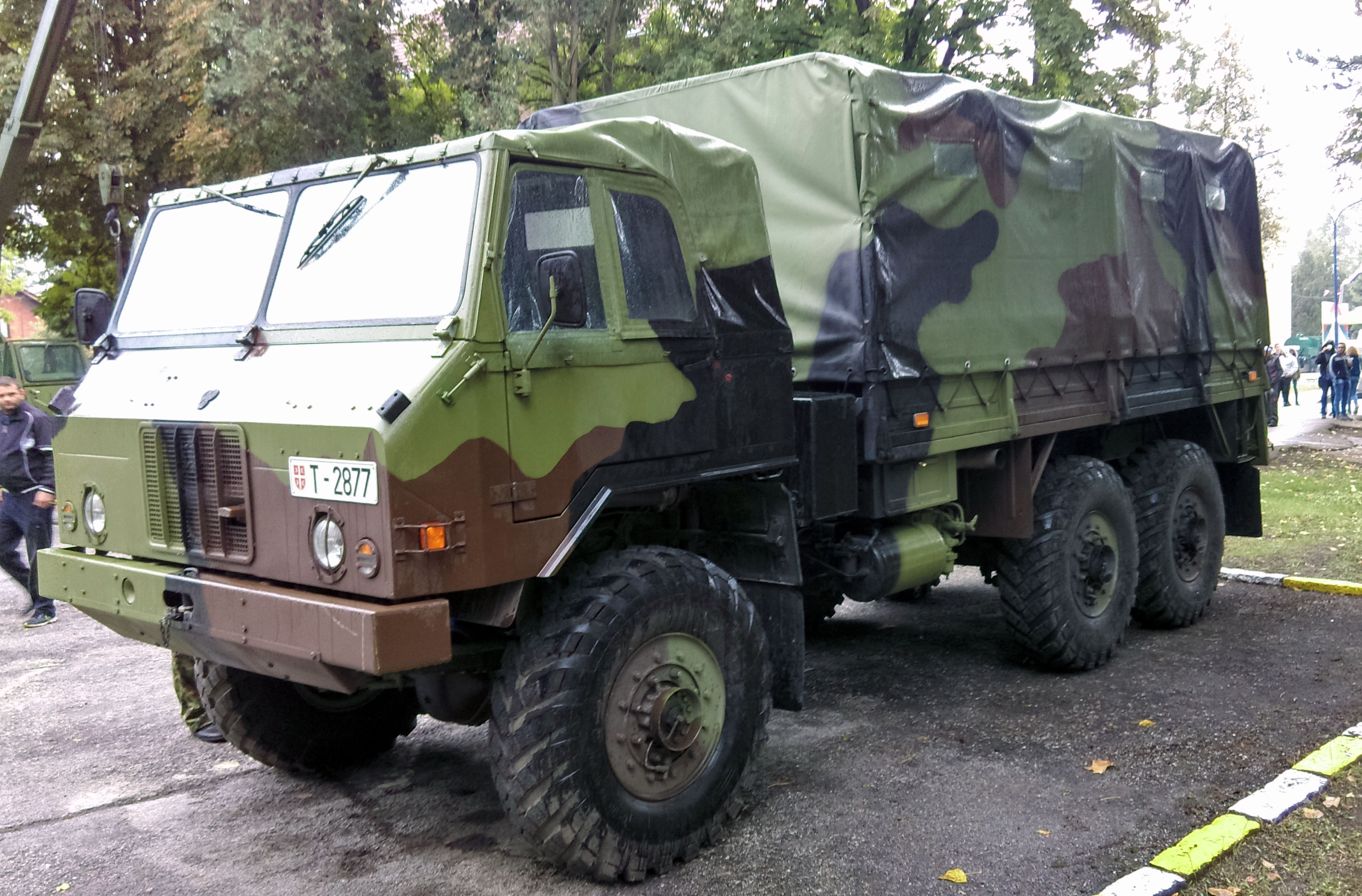

Overview
- Manufacturer: TAM
- Production: 1979–1991
- Designer: TAM

Body and chassis
- Class: 6x6 Utility, Transport Truck
- Body style: COE

Powertrain
- Engine: Deutz F 6L 413 F
- Transmission: Z5-35 S

Dimensions
- Wheelbase: 3,100 mm (122.0 in)
- Length: 6,550 mm (257.9 in)
- Width: 2,275 mm (89.6 in)
- Height: 2,820 mm (111.0 in)
- Curb weight: 6,400 kg (14,110 lb)

Chronology
- Successor: TAM 162 T9

The TAM 150 T11 B/BV is a general-purpose off-road lorry made by Slovenian vehicle manufacturer Tovarna avtomobilov Maribor (TAM). The six-wheel-drive lorry was designed for use by the Yugoslav People's Army, in the transport of personnel, weapons, and materials.

== Development ==
In 1965, the Department for Traffic of the Federal Secretariat of People's Defense, formed a workgroup to analyse the unarmored vehicles of the Yugoslav People's Army. A study was produced by the workgroup, which concluded that there were 129 different vehicle models in 320 types of service.

The study prompted, in 1966, the Main Military Technical Council to reduce the number of vehicle models in service, through the development of five vehicle classes: 0.75-ton 4x4 off-road vehicle, 1.5-ton 4x4 off-road truck, 3-ton 6x6 off-road truck, 6-ton 6x6 off-road truck and 9-ton 8x8 heavy off-road truck.

In 1976, the plan for 1.5-ton 4x4 off-road trucks was realised, by Tovarna avtomobilov Maribor, with the TAM 110 T7 B/BV, developed from a Magirus-Deutz design. The design of the TAM 150 T11 B/BV was based was on that of the TAM 110 T7 B/BV, and it was produced from 1979.

== Variants ==
The standard variant has a short cab with canvas and a standard cargo bed and is used for transport of personnel (18 + 2 troops with equipment) and materials (such as a tractor for artillery and anti-aircraft artillery weapons).

The variant with hardtop cab is used for different bodyworks - mobile NBC decontamination tanker truck (ACD M.78), communications vehicle, mobile workshop, and fire truck (M-77).

The standard TAM 150 T7 B/BV with canvas cab has been used as a platform for the M-94 Plamen-S self-propelled multiple rocket launcher and as a platform for the Košava rocket launcher.

BOV family armoured vehicles have been developed on a TAM 150 T11 base.

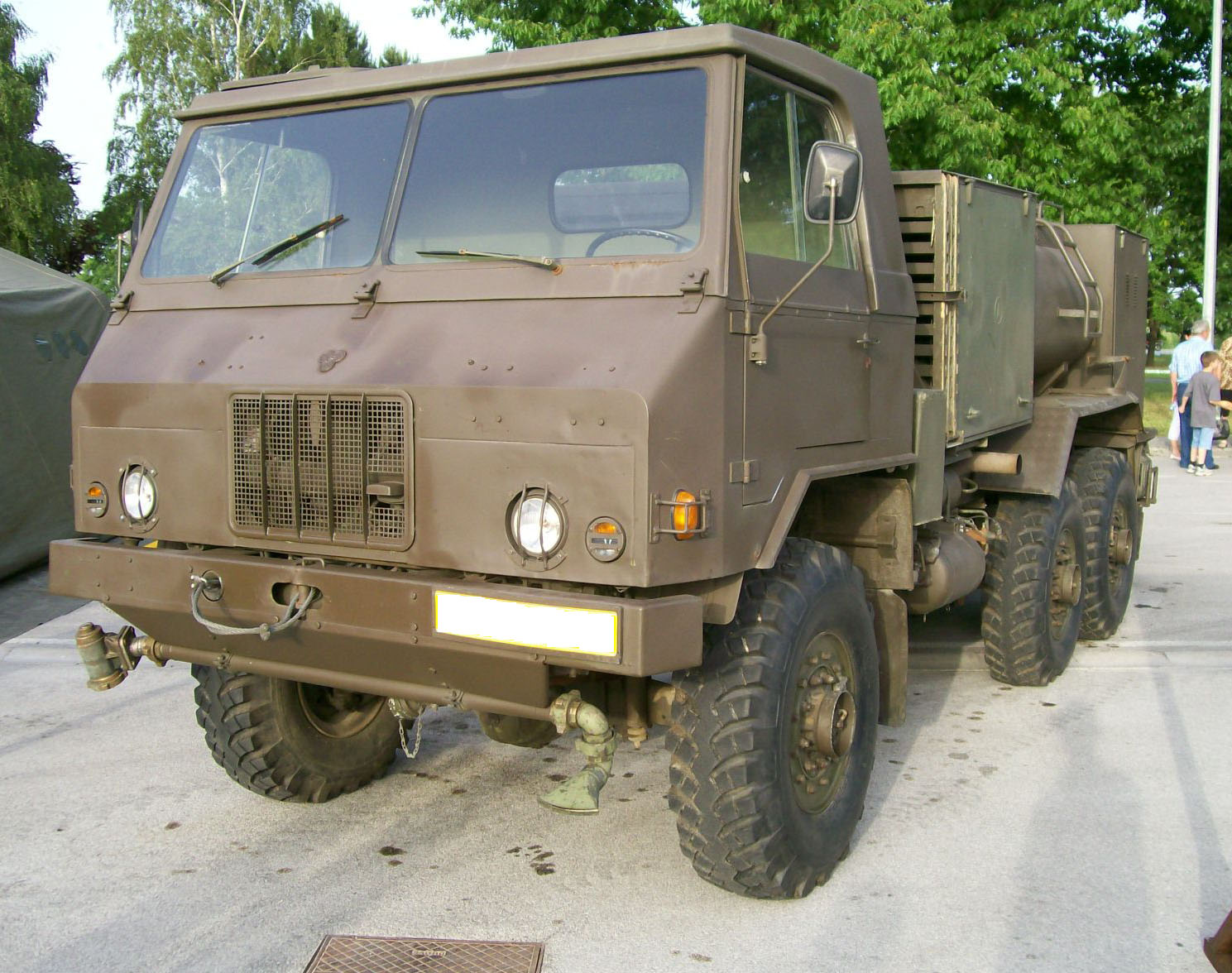
TAM 150 T11 BV ACD M.78 decontamination tanker truck, Croatian Army.

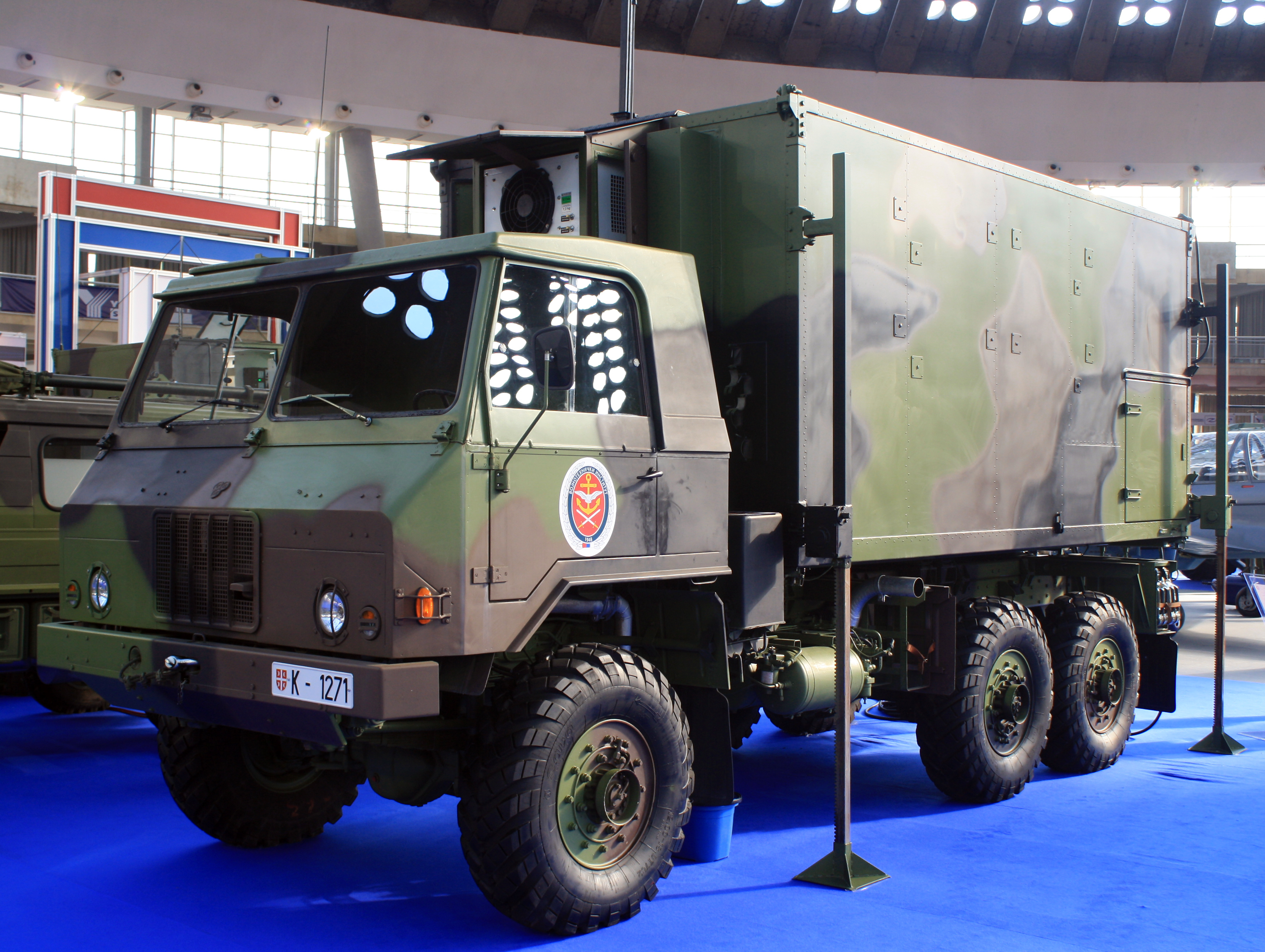
Mobile switching node for brigade-level integrated into TAM 150 T11.

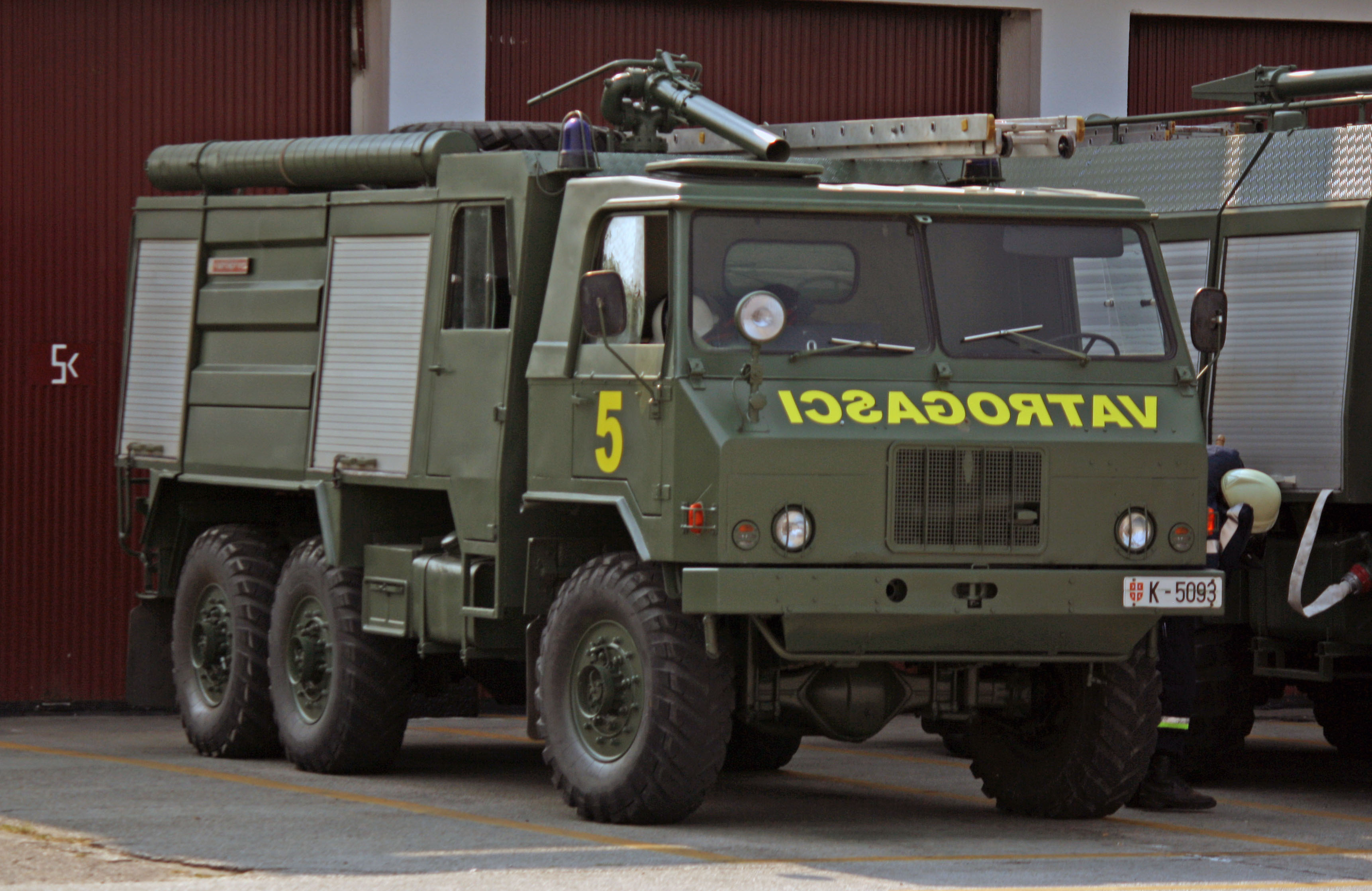
TAM 150 T11 B M-77 Serbian Air Force firetruck at Batajnica Air Base.

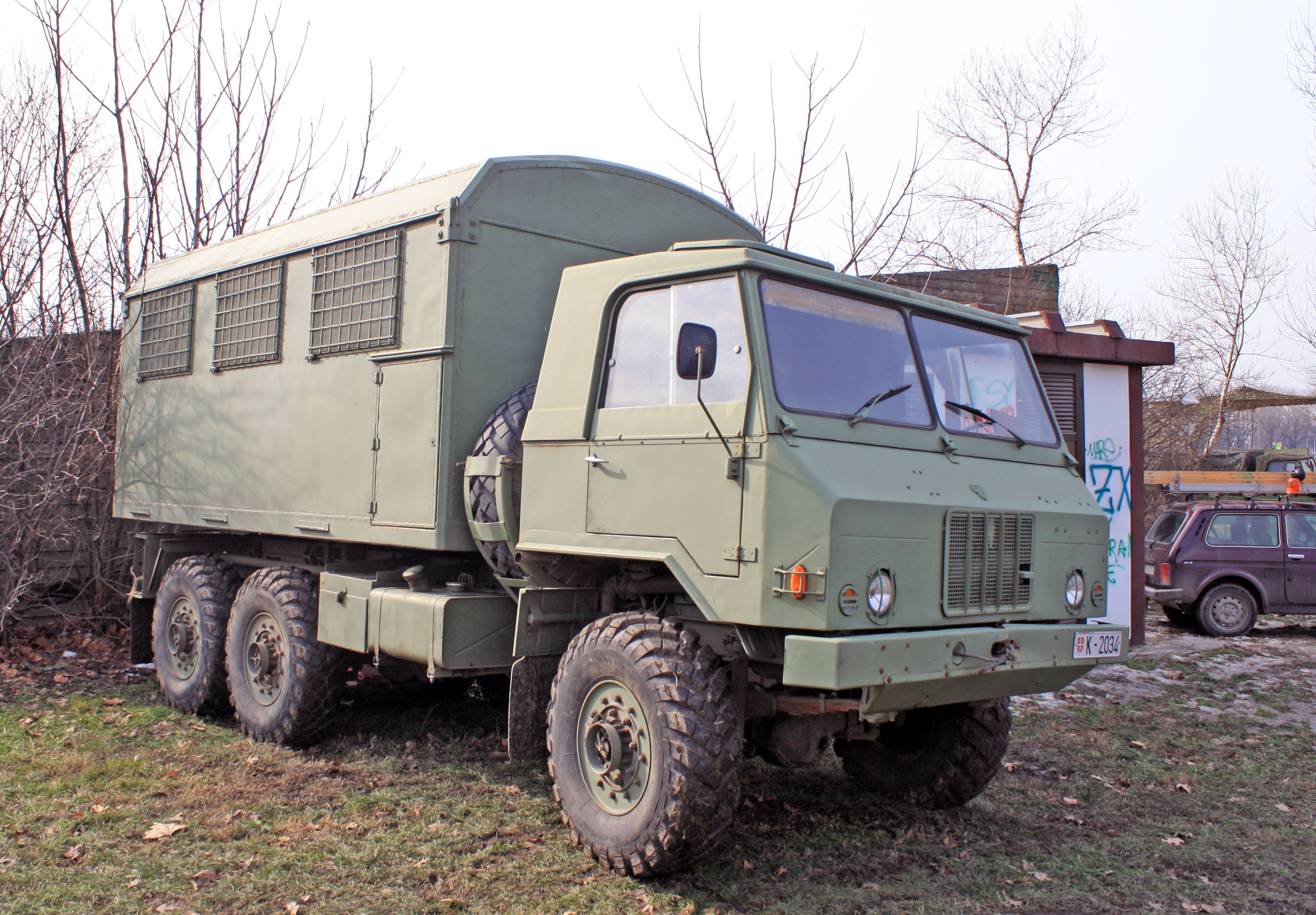
Serbian Army TAM 150 T11 BV mobile workshop.

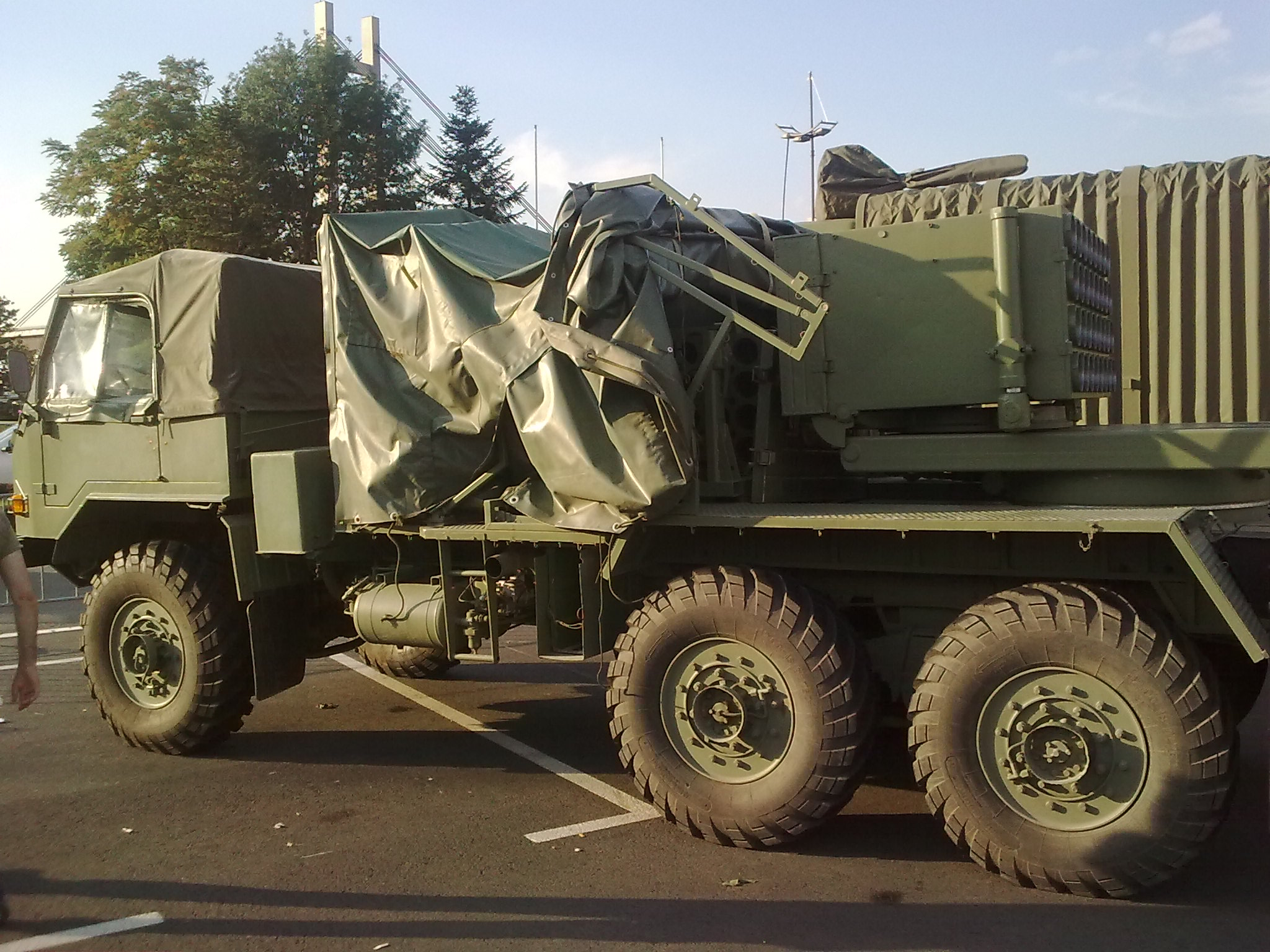
M-94 Plamen-S MLRS.

== Operators ==
TAM 150 T11 B/BV was mainly produced for the needs of the Yugoslav People's Army and milicija. A number of vehicles have been exported to Middle Eastern countries during the 1980s.

After the breakup of Yugoslavia, most vehicles were passed to successor states. Today, the TAM 150 T7 B/BV is used by the militaries of Serbia, Slovenia, Croatia, Bosnia and Herzegovina, Republic of North Macedonia and Montenegro. They are also used by special police forces such as the Serbian Gendarmery.

== Technical data ==
=== Dimensions ===
- Length - 6550 mm
- Width - 2275 mm
- Height - 2420
- Height without roof and windshield - 2820 mm
- Wheelbase - 3100
- Cargo bed internal dimensions:
  - Length - 4170 mm
  - Width - 2120 mm
  - Height - 500 mm

=== Weight ===
- Curb weight - 6400 kg
- Load capacity on-road - 3000 kg
- Load capacity off-road - 5000 kg
