= Praga RN =

Praga RN/RND
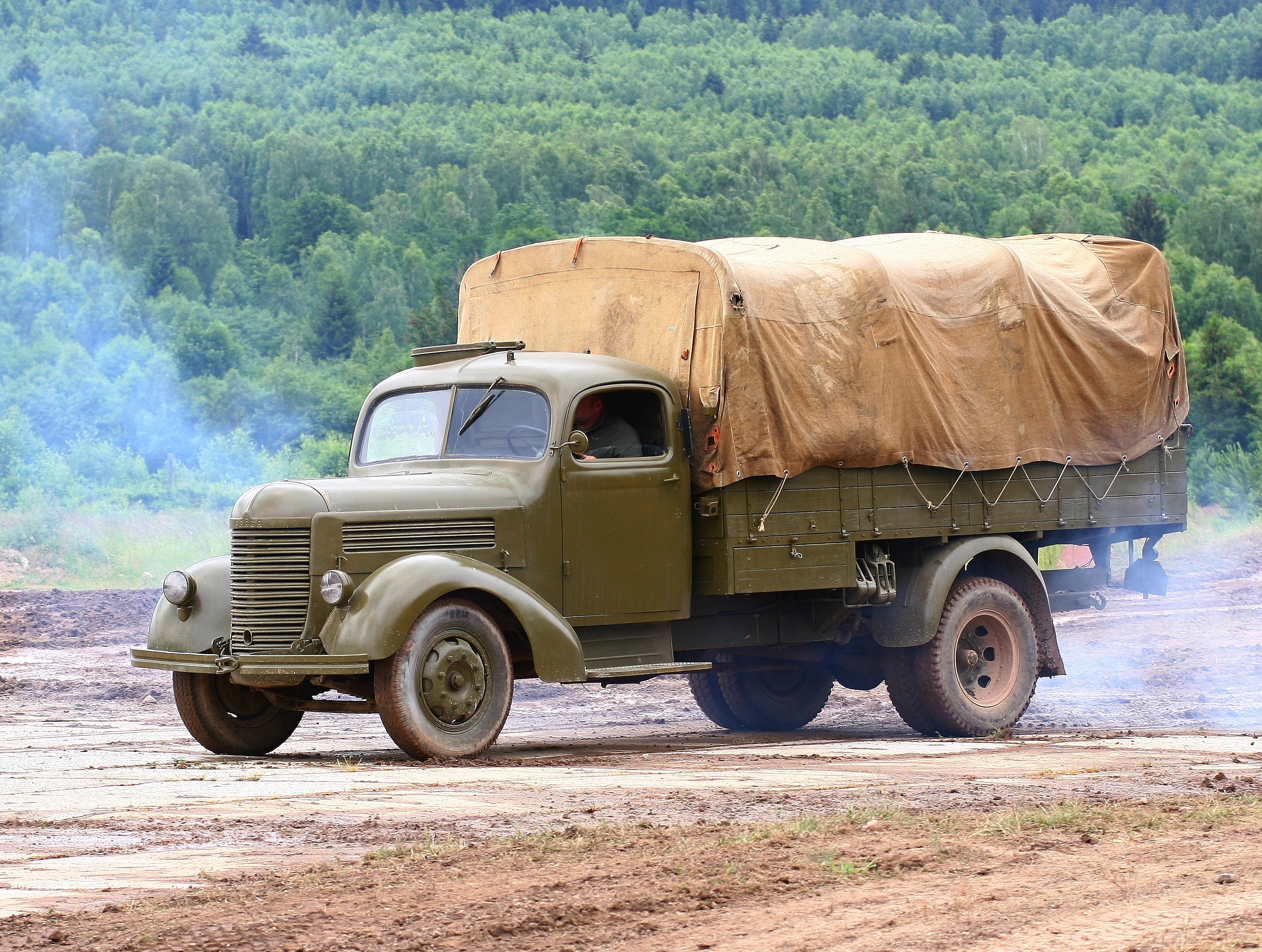
- Praga RN of Czechoslovak Army, 1950

Overview
- Manufacturer: Praga
- Production: 1933–1953 (RN); 1934–1955 (RND); 1947–1962 (Pionir)
- Assembly: Czechoslovakia: Libeň, Vysočany; Yugoslavia: Rakovica, Maribor

Body and chassis
- Class: Medium truck
- Layout: Front-engine, rear-wheel drive

Powertrain
- Engine: 3,468 cc (211.6 cu in) I6 petrol, 38–52 kW (51–70 hp) (RN); 4,501 cc (274.7 cu in) I4 diesel, 37–44 kW (50–59 hp) (RND)
- Transmission: 4 speed manual

Dimensions
- Wheelbase: 4,200 mm (165.4 in)
- Length: 6,780 mm (266.9 in) (flatbed); 7,450 mm (293.3 in) (bus)
- Width: 2,200 mm (86.6 in) (flatbed); 2,350 mm (92.5 in) (bus)
- Height: 2,185 mm (86.0 in) (flatbed); 3,000 mm (118.1 in) (bus)
- Curb weight: 2,000–2,790 kg (4,409–6,151 lb) (RN); 2,000–3,100 kg (4,409–6,834 lb) (RND)

The Praga RN (Czech: Rychlý Nákladní, lit. 'Fast Freight') was a medium-sized truck manufactured by Praga from 1933. The vehicle was powered by a six-cylinder petrol engine. From 1934, the diesel-powered version Praga RND (Czech: Rychlý Nákladní Diesel, lit. 'Fast Freight Diesel') was also manufactured. The trucks were manufactured for nearly three decades and became one of the most widely used freight wagons in Czechoslovakia, the chassis being used for buses and fire engines as well as for military uses. RN production ended in 1953 and RND in 1955, although production continued in Yugoslavia until 1962. In total, around 40,000 Praga RN and RND were produced, including about 3,700 buses, as well as 18,300 RN license built in Yugoslavia.

== History ==
Praga launched the RN in 1933 as a traditional medium-weight truck with rigid axles and a sheet metal cab wrapped around a wooden skeleton and mounted on a ladder frame. Initial production was 94 vehicles, half in 1934. In 1937, a larger carburettor was introduced that increased power from 38 kW (51 hp) to over 50 kW (67 hp) and payload from 2,000 kg (4,400 lb) to 2,500 kg (5,500 lb), along with a more modern slightly rounded cab. A more radical redesign took place in 1938 with a new cab design with a radiator with more fashionable horizontal vents. This design then remained unchanged for nearly twenty years.

At the same time, the greater efficiency of the diesel engine, and lower price of the fuel, led to Praga building four test vehicles in 1934 and 1935 equipped with a four-cylinder diesel engine named RND (the D designating Diesel). These were followed by more test vehicles and an initial production run of sixty trucks in 1937. Production of both trucks continued through World War II, until Allied bombing damaged the plant in Libeň on 25 March 1945. During the war, a wood gas powerplant was fitted called Imbert or Janka instead of the spark ignition engine.

After the war, production resumed in a new plant in Vysočany, initially using the wood gas engine. The vehicles had a reinforced frame which increased payload to 3,000 kg (6,600 lb) and led to a proliferation of different designs, from tankers to refuse vehicles, fire engines to buses. In 1946, along with petrol for the RN, the RND was reintroduced, now fitted with the Ricardo Comet III that increased power from 37 kW (50 hp) to 44 kW (59 hp) while also improving fuel consumption.

The last RN was produced in 1953. In total, 23,747 vehicles of all versions, including about 2,100 buses, were built. By the end of production in 1955, 16,288 RND had been produced, including 1,630 buses.

== Drivetrain ==
The RN was powered by a six-cylinder side valve petrol engine with a stroke of 80 mm (3.1 in) and bore of 115 mm (4.5 in). A Solex carburetor and 75Ah 12V battery were fitted. Maximum torque was 186 N⋅m (137 lbf⋅ft) and fuel consumption was 25 L/100 km (11 mpg_{‑imp}; 9.4 mpg_{‑US}). A 95 L (21 imp gal; 25 US gal) fuel tank was located under the right seat.

The RND was powered by a four cylinder overhead valve diesel engine with a stroke of 105 mm (4.1 in) and bore of 130 mm (5.1 in). A Bosch injector and 105Ah 12V battery were fitted. Maximum torque was 226 N⋅m (167 lbf⋅ft) and fuel consumption was 15 L/100 km (19 mpg_{‑imp}; 16 mpg_{‑US}). A 70 L (15 imp gal; 18 US gal) fuel tank was located under the right seat and a 105 L (23 imp gal; 28 US gal) tank behind the rear axle. Drive was to the rear wheels via a four speed non-synchromesh manual transmission and universal joints. Hydraulic drum brakes were fitted all round and suspension was leaf spring.

== Licensed production in Yugoslavia ==
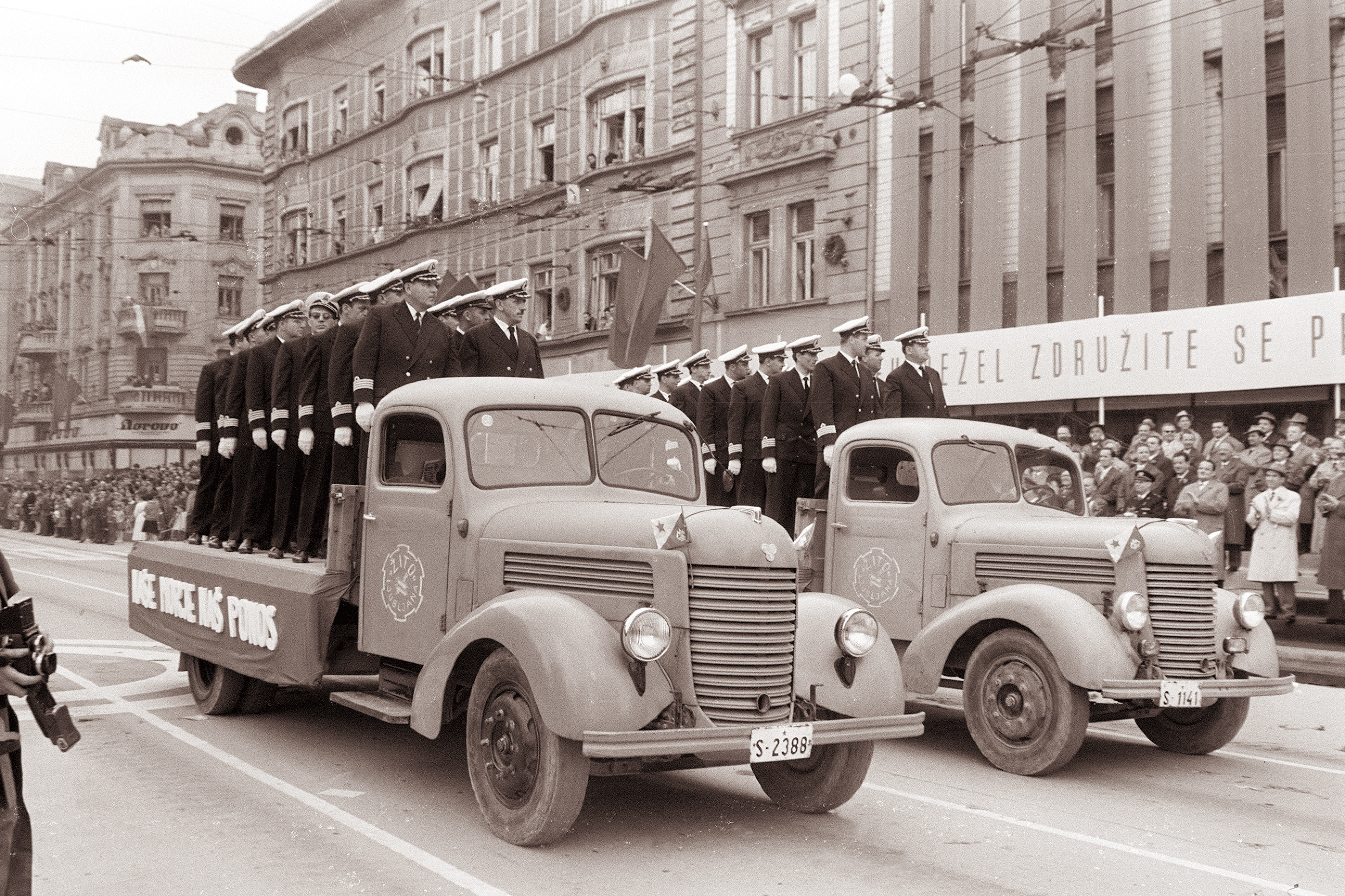
TAM Pionir in Ljubljana in 1961

In 1938, the Kingdom of Yugoslavia launched a competition to find a truck design that would be license produced in the country. The competing vehicles had to complete a 8,000 km (5,000 mi) journey across Yugoslav roads of poor quality. The RN won and in 1938, the Zavodi Aleksandar Ranković (ZAR), ancestor of post WWII Industrija Motora Rakovica (IMR) plant near Belgrade, started to receive parts for assembly, the first Yugoslav manufactured vehicle rolling off the production line in 1940. Unfortunately, production was cut short by the invasion of Yugoslavia in 1941.

Production resumed in 1947 with the name Pionir, but by 1950 less than 1,200 had been made. Production was therefore moved to Tovarna avtomobilov Maribor in Maribor. 17,146 vehicles, known as TAM Pionir, were then produced during the next fifteen years, the last one rolling off the production line in 1962. The majority were flatbed trucks, but a number of fire engines, buses and other vehicles were also produced.

== Nicknames ==
The RN was popularly nicknamed Erena and the RND was known as Randál, the latter not only simply a phonetic derivative of the initials but also a comment on the noisy engine.
