= Industrija Motora Rakovica =

Tractor manufacturer based in Belgrade, Serbia, formerly Yugoslavia

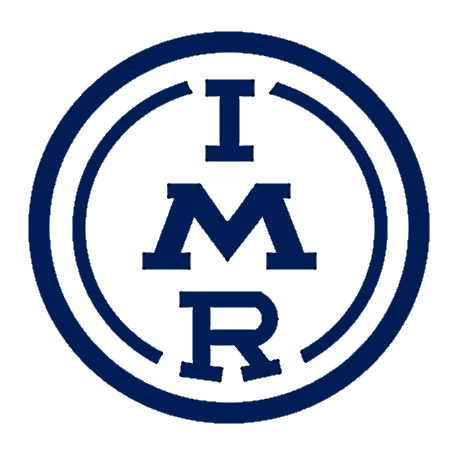
- Native name: Индустрија Мотора Раковица
- Type: Joint-stock company
- Industry: Agribusiness
- Founded: 1927
- Defunct: 2015
- Headquarters: Rakovica, Belgrade, Serbia
- Products: Agricultural machinery, Tractors
- Owner: Hyundai

Industrija Motora Rakovica (Serbian Cyrillic: Индустрија Мотора Раковица; abbr. IMR) was an agricultural machinery manufacturer based in Rakovica, Belgrade, Serbia. Originally founded in 1927 as Zadrugar, they build tractors and engines. The engines are based on originally licensed Perkins engine models. Some of the tractors were based on Landini and Massey Ferguson models, originally licensed.

In 2009, IMR formed a partnership or joint venture with IMT, also of Serbia. In 2011, IMR began sending CKD tractors to Ethiopia for assembly. They are also sold in Egypt as EAMCO tractors. IMR shut down in 2015 along with IMT but with no plans for bringing it back.

Rakovica model names indicate their horsepower and most of the models had the DV (meaning 4×4, Serbian:Dupla Vuča) option. The most popular model is the 65, but the model range included:

60, 65, 76, Super series with redesigned bodies (47, 65, 76),120/135 (which had ZF transmissions), limited production 65 12 BS and 75 12 BS tractors.

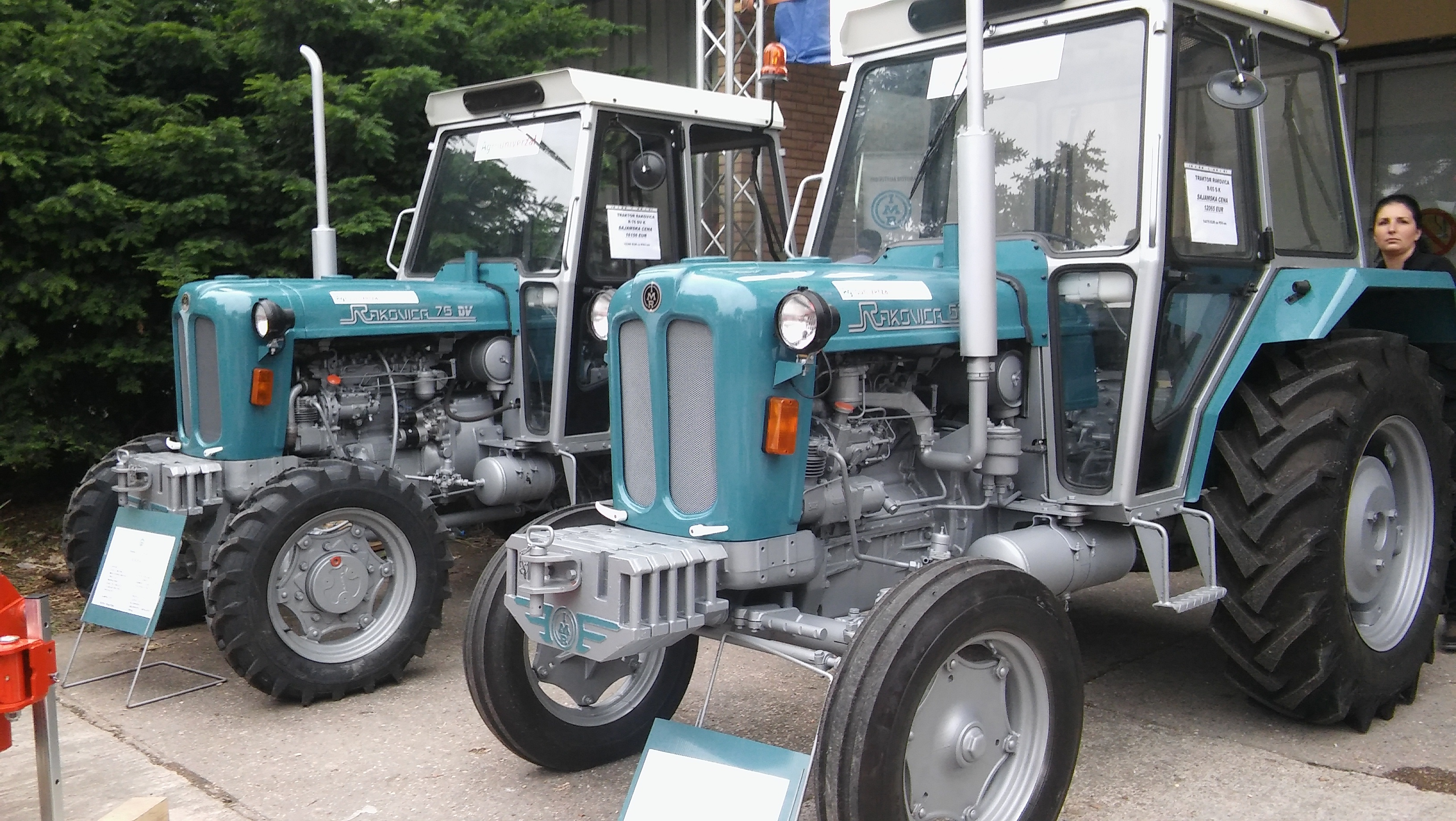
Rakovica 76 DV and Rakovica 65 at 2016 Novi Sad Agri fair

Over the years, they also made some concept tractors, which included:

Rakovica 50 DV (Re-styled Goldoni tractor), Rakovica Transporter (also a re-styled Goldoni vehicle) and Rakovica R110 Turbo.

At the beginning of 2025, a businessman from Egypt bought machines and a license for the production of tractors from the old factory and restarted the production of tractors in Trstenik, under the new name New IMR Rakovica. It produces tractors of 65, 76 and 90 horsepower.
