= Izidor Kovárik =

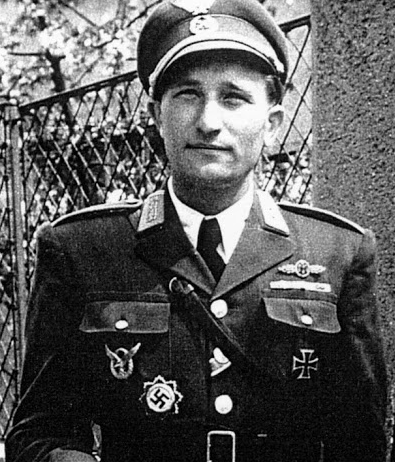
- Born: 29 March 1917; Kopčany, Austria-Hungary
- Died: 11 July 1944 (aged 27); Zvolen, Slovak State
- Burial place: Kopčany
- Military career
- Allegiance: Slovak Republic
- Branch: Slovak Air Force (SVZ)
- Service years: 1938–1944
- Unit: 11th Fighter Squadron
- Awards: German Cross in gold; Ehrenpokal der Luftwaffe; Iron Cross 1st & 2nd Class; Front Flying Clasp of the Luftwaffe; Za Zasluhy ("For Merit") medal, 2nd & 3rd class; War Victory Cross Order 6th class; Pamätný odznak Za ťaženie proti ZSSR 1st class

Izidor Kovárik (29 March 1917 – 11 July 1944) was a fighter pilot in the Czechoslovak Air Force (1938–1939) and Slovak Air Force (1939–1944) who became a flying ace on the Eastern Front in the Second World War. He became Slovakia's second-highest scoring fighter ace, shooting down 28 Soviet aircraft and probably one more. He was killed in an aircraft accident in 1944.

== Early life ==
Kovárik was born in 1917 in Kopčany, a village in what was then the Lands of the Crown of Saint Stephen, near the border with Moravia. Kovárik joined the Czechoslovak Air Force in April 1938, and was posted to flying school at Spišská Nová Ves in eastern Slovakia.

== SVZ service ==
In March 1939 Nazi Germany partitioned Czechoslovakia and made the Slovak Republic a client state. Kovárik continued his training with Slovakia's new air force (SVZ) and qualified in November 1939. In December he was posted to the 11th Fighter Squadron, which was equipped with Avia B-534 fighter biplanes.

When Germany invaded the Soviet Union in June 1941, Slovakia joined the war on the German side. Kovárik's squadron remained stationed near Bratislava until November, when it was posted to Ukraine. In October 1942 he flew a Praga E-241 as a courier pilot. Ondřej Ďumbala, leader of the 13th Fighter Squadron, noted Kovárik's talent and recommended him for further training.

In November and December 1942 Kovárik was trained to fly the German Messerschmitt Bf 109E monoplane fighter. He shot down his first Soviet aircraft in January 1943. By March he had shot down 11 aircraft, been shot down once but survived. Germany awarded him the Iron Cross Second Class.

Kovárik later flew missions over the Kuban River and Caucasus. He had won 28 confirmed victories by July 1943, when he was recalled to Slovakia. In February 1944 he began to be trained on the more modern Messerschmitt Bf 109G-6.

=== Death ===
In April 1944 Kovárik was posted to Sliač Airbase in central Slovakia as a flying instructor. On 11 July he was training a young pilot, Ladislav Ciprian, in a Gotha Go 145 biplane. When the aircraft was at an altitude of 1,300 to 2,000 feet (400 to 600 m) one of its port wings broke. Both Kovárik and Ciprian baled out, but the cords of their parachutes became caught in the aircraft's rudder. The Gotha crashed 1 to 2 miles (2 to 3 km) east of Zvolen, killing both men.

=== Achievements and awards ===
Kovárik was Slovakia's second-highest-scoring fighter ace of the Second World War. Only Ján Režňák won more victories than he.

Kovárik was awarded Nazi Germany's second-highest decoration: the German Cross in Gold. He was also awarded the Ehrenpokal der Luftwaffe, Iron Cross First Class and Front Flying Clasp of the Luftwaffe in addition to his earlier Iron Cross Second Class. The Slovak Republic awarded him its Za Zasluhy ("For Merit") medal, second and third class, War Victory Cross Order sixth class and Pamätný odznak Za ťaženie proti ZSSR ("Commemorative medal for the struggle against the USSR") first class.
