= Martis (disambiguation) =

Martis is a comune (municipality) in the Province of Sassari in the Italian region Sardinia.

Martis may also refer to:

== People ==
- Eternity Martis (born 1993), Canadian author
- John Martis (born 1940), Scottish former professional footballer
- Liandro Martis (born 1995), Curaçaoan professional footballer who as a striker
- Nikolaos Martis (1915–2013), Greek author and politician
- Shairon Martis (born 1987), Dutch-Curaçaoan professional baseball pitcher
- Shelton Martis (born 1982), Curaçaoan footballer who plays as a defender
- Stefan Martis, fourth-highest scoring fighter ace from Slovakia during World War II

== Other ==
- Marti's department store, Long Beach, California
- Martis people, now extinct Native American group
- Martis Valley, Martis Creek, Martis Lake, etc., a geographic feature in the western United States
