= B34 =

B34 may refer to:

- Avia B-34, a biplane fighter aircraft built in Czechoslovakia in the early 1930s
- Sicilian Defence, Accelerated Dragon, Encyclopaedia of Chess Openings code
- Lockheed B-34 Lexington, a bomber and patrol aircraft of World War II, used by United States and British Commonwealth forces
- Unterseeboot B-34, a German Type UB II submarine of the German Imperial Navy during World War I
