= Avia B-34 =

B-34
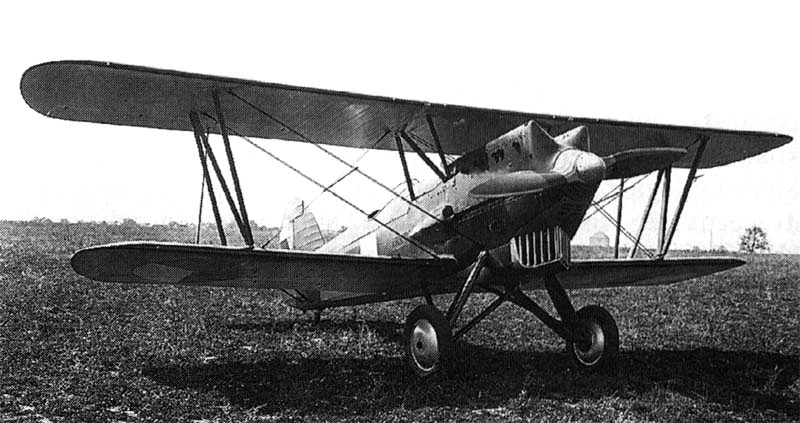

General information
- Type: Fighter
- Manufacturer: Avia
- Designer: František Novotný
- Primary user: Czechoslovak Air Force
- Number built: 14

History
- First flight: 2 February 1932

The Avia B-34 was a biplane fighter aircraft built in Czechoslovakia in the early 1930s. It was the first design of František Novotný for the Avia company and although built only in small numbers, it paved the way for the Avia B-534.

== Development ==
The B-34 was an all-metal single-bay biplane of conventional configuration, with tailwheel undercarriage. The mainwheels of the prototype were fitted with large spats. The first prototype underwent testing from 2 February 1932, leading to a large number of modifications being made, in particular the tail and engine cowling designs were considerably revised. The resulting B-34.1 served as the prototype for the 12 production machines ordered by the Czechoslovak Air Force. These had an even larger vertical tail, interplane struts of narrower chord, and no wheel spats.

A second prototype, the B-34.2 was fitted with an Avia Rr 29 radial engine but was never actually flown with it as the engine was not sufficiently developed. It was, however, offered to the Air Force under the redesignation B-234. The second prototype was then fitted with an inline Hispano-Suiza 12Ybrs piston engine, and later redesignated B-534.1.

== Operational history ==
The twelve production B-34s entered service with the 37 Stíhací Letka (fighter squadron) of the Czechoslovak Air Force in September 1934. They were retired to training duties in 1937. Despite inferior overall performance and some unpopularity, the aircraft was robust. Until the end of the First Czechoslovak Republic in March 1939, only one aircraft was lost; B-34.4 crashed and was written off in April 1937.

Eight of the B-34s were handed over to the German Luftwaffe when the Czechoslovak state ceased to exist in March 1939. At least three were soon lost in crashes and it is likely that the others were retired from use rather than being used for training purposes. The remaining three B-34s were retained by the new Slovak Air Force (1939–1945) (Slovenské vzdušné zbrane). One, perhaps two of these were still being used for training at Tri Duby airfield (today called Sliač Airport) in August 1944. They then effectively became part of the Kombinovaná letka (combined squadron) of the Slovak Insurgent Air Force during the Slovak National Uprising against the Germans in September 1944. There is no evidence of them being used in combat at this time and if they survived the uprising they were almost certainly among the aircraft destroyed by the Slovaks before they left the airfield after the failure of the uprising.

== Variants ==
B-34.1 First prototype, flew Feb 1932

B-34.2 Second prototype, redesignated B-234 with Avia Rr 29 engine, then again as B-34.2 with Hispano-Suiza 12Ybrs engine, redesignated Avia B-534.1.

B-34.3 to B-34.14 Production aircraft

== Units using this aircraft ==
Czechoslovakia
Czechoslovak 37 Letka (squadron) 3rd Air Regiment
Germany
The German Luftwaffe
Slovakia
Slovak Air Force (1939–1945)

== Specifications (B-34/1) ==
General characteristics

- Crew: one pilot
- Length: 7.25 m (23 ft 9 in)
- Wingspan: 9.40 m (30 ft 10 in)
- Wing area: 23.9 m^{2} (257 sq ft)
- Empty weight: 1,305 kg (2,877 lb)
- Gross weight: 1,730 kg (3,814 lb)
- Powerplant: 1 × liquid cooled Avia Vr 36 (Hispano-Siuza HS-12Nbr) engine , 552 kW (740 hp)

Performance

- Maximum speed: 315 km/h (196 mph, 170 kn)
- Range: 600 km (370 mi, 320 nmi)
- Service ceiling: 7,000 m (23,000 ft)
- Rate of climb: 3.7 m/s (720 ft/min)

Armament

- 2 × fixed, forward-firing 7.92 mm vz.28 machine guns

== See also ==
- Avia B-534
