= Avia B-534 =

1933 fighter aircraft family by Avia

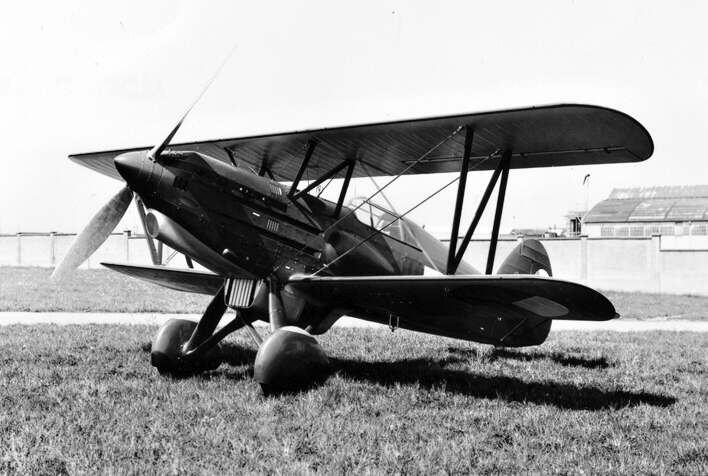
- Avia B-534 fighter, late variant

General information
- Type: Fighter aircraft
- Manufacturer: Avia
- Designer: František Novotný
- Status: Retired
- Primary user: Czechoslovak Air Force
- Number built: 568

History
- Introduction date: 1935
- First flight: 25 May 1933

The Avia B-534 is a Czechoslovak biplane fighter developed and manufactured by aviation company Avia. It was produced during the interwar period. The B-534 was perhaps one of the best-known Czechoslovak aircraft of the era.

During 1932, work had commenced on the development of a new single-engined biplane fighter aircraft, the Avia B-34, which had been designed by aeronautical engineer František Novotný. During its development, various alternative engines were considered and trialled before eventually settling upon the licence-built Hispano-Suiza 12Y engine. Other improvements during the prototype stage included the adoption of an enclosed cockpit along with a revised tail and undercarriage arrangement. On 14 April 1934, the second prototype, while flown by test pilot Václav Kočí, successfully attained a Czechoslovak national speed record of 365.7 kilometres per hour (227.2 mph). Deliveries of aircraft to the Czechoslovak Air Force commenced in October 1935.

Partially as a result of its impressive maneuvrability, as well as some operators continuing to maintain a preference for the established biplane configuration over the incoming generation of monoplane fighters that would soon prove to outperform them, the B-534 stayed in production for considerable time (1933–1939). During the late 1930s, Czechoslovakia sought to expand production of the type in response to German claims over the Sudetenland (the western border area of Czechoslovakia). Large numbers of the type saw combat with multiple nations during the course of the Second World War. While relatively ineffective in combat during the later stages of war due to its obsolescence, the type formed a sizeable proportion of several countries' military aviation components.

== Development ==
=== Origins ===
During 1932, the Czechoslovak aircraft company Avia flew the first prototype of a single-engined fighter biplane, the Avia B-34, designed by aeronautical engineer František Novotný. After modification, the Czechoslovak Ministry of Defence placed an order for B-34s. A second prototype, the Avia B-34/2, was built, which was intended to be powered by a 450 kilowatts (600 hp) Avia Rr 29 radial engine instead of the Hispano-Suiza 12N V12 engine of the first prototype and the initial production series. This engine proved prone to overheating and vibration, however, and it was decided to re-engine the B.34/2 before it flew, fitting it with a Hispano-Suiza 12Ybrs V12 engine.

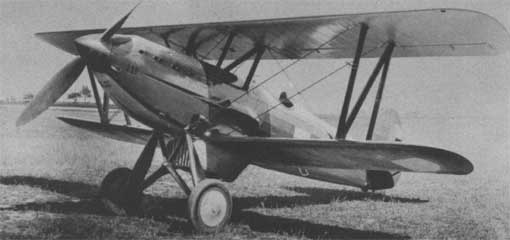
B-534.1, the first prototype of B-534

The Avia B-34/2 made its maiden flight on 25 May 1933. The prototype was sent for testing in September and was redesignated as the B-534.1. On 10 September, the B-534 was displayed to the public for the first time at an Army Air Day. It was to compete against the Praga E-44 and Letov Š-231.

A second prototype, the B-534.2, was completed in September 1933. It differed from the first prototype by having an enclosed cockpit and a revised tail and undercarriage. On 14 April 1934, the second prototype, while flown by test pilot Václav Kočí, successfully attained a Czechoslovak national speed record of 365.7 kilometres per hour (227.2 mph).

=== Initial production ===
More testing followed, and an initial order for 34 aircraft for the Czechoslovak Air Force, soon increasing to 147, was placed on 17 July 1934. At that time, the B-534 was well ahead of its contemporaries. The United Kingdom was still dependent on Hawker Furies, with the first Gloster Gladiators being produced at this time. The Soviet Union was placing its hope on its Polikarpov aircraft designs. The United States was still using descendants of the Curtiss Hawk series, with the Seversky P-35 and Curtiss P-36 about to fly as prototypes.

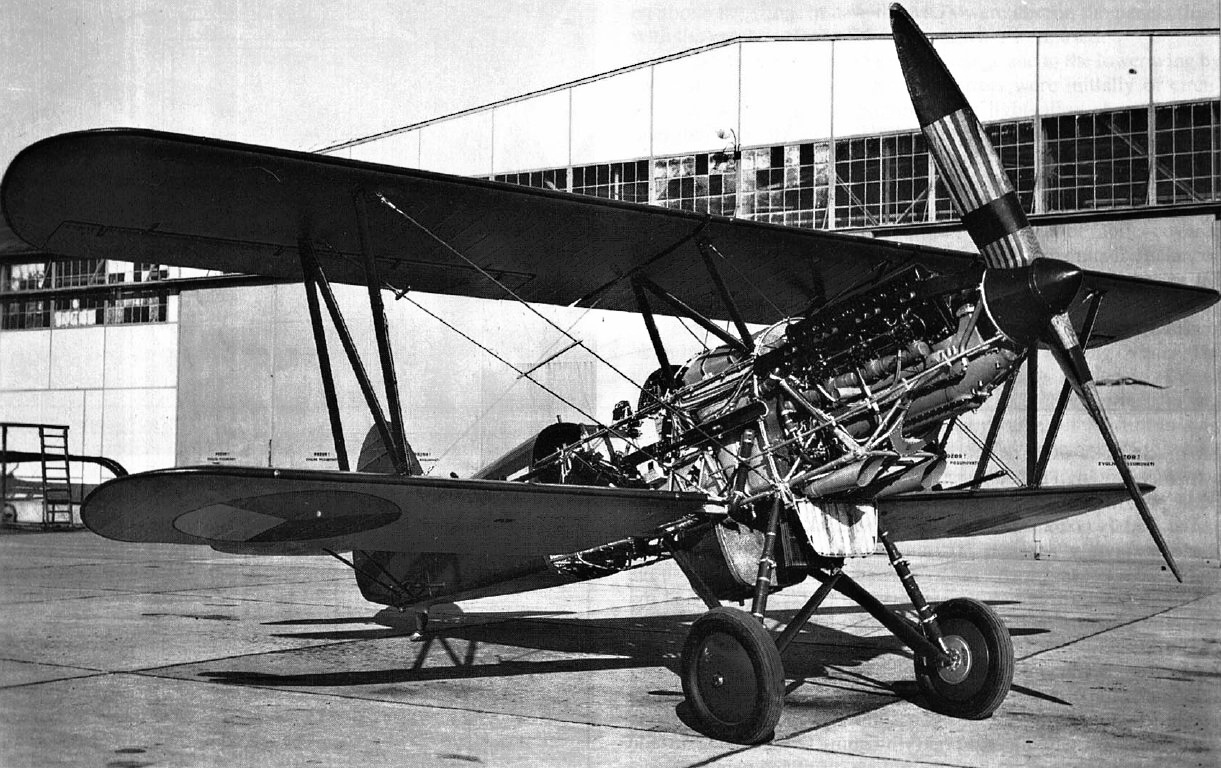
B-534, early variant

The B-534 was designed as a single-engine biplane fighter with a licence-built Hispano-Suiza inline powerplant, and fixed landing gear. The air forces of the 1930s were reluctant to abandon the manoeuvrability and climb rates of biplanes for the speed of monoplanes, even in the face of new and better technology. The success of Soviet pilots with biplanes may have contributed to this reluctance; they were known to strip their aircraft of sliding canopies, preferring to have the wind in their faces. Aircraft with two fabric-covered wings and fixed landing gear were also less expensive to manufacture.

First deliveries of the B-534 to the Czechoslovak air force began in October 1935, and 568 had been completed by 1939. The first 100 of these were of the first series. The second prototype was the blueprint for the I series, although it was built with an open cockpit. These early series aircraft were initially armed with four 7.92mm vz.28 guns. Two were located in the nose on either side of the engine in a similar manner to the Avia B-34 and two were fitted in the wings. At an early stage of production, it was however recognised that the wing-mounted guns were troublesome. Aircraft from serial number B-534.47 were completed without the wing guns, which were also removed from the earlier aircraft. The first to fourth series aircraft were fitted with the Avia licence-built version of the Hispano-Suiza 12Ydrs engine. This was a liquid-cooled V12-cylinder engine with a capacity of 36.05 litres. On the ground its normal power rating was 650 hp, it could deliver 750 hp for two minutes. At an operational height of 3,000 m (9,842 ft), it could deliver 850 hp for 30 minutes. At an operational height of 4,000 m (13,123 ft), it could reach 860 hp. Total fuel was 347 litres (76 gal) which was held in two fuselage fuel tanks of 90 and 257 litres.

=== Further development ===
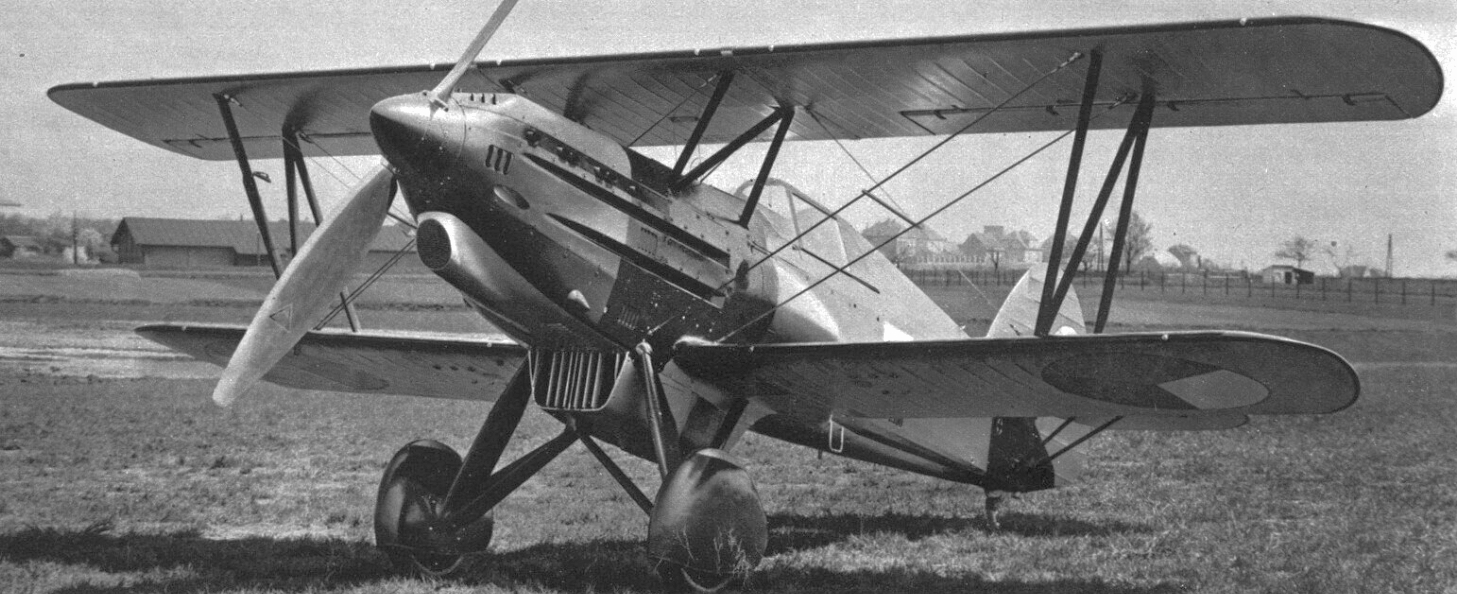
B-534, 3rd variant

The II series completed the remainder of the first order from the Czechoslovak Government, These were 45 aircraft numbered B-534.102 to 147. Like the I series these carried four guns. However the solution to the problems with the wing-mounted guns was to move these guns, now upgraded to the vz.30 to the fuselage with the others. The four 7.92 mm (0.312 in) machine guns were located on the sides of the fuselage, firing through the propeller. One very modern innovation was a bubble canopy; this had been tested on a small number of the early series aircraft, although it certainly was not a standard fit.

During 1936, a second order for 46 aircraft was issued by the government. The first 25 of these were the B-534/III version serial numbers B-534: 148–173. Production took place in the second half of 1936. It entered service between March and April 1937. The III series had aerodynamic refinements which saw the streamlining of the front carburetor air intake. Mudguard spats were also often added at the factory to the main gear.

The remainder of the second order from 534.174 to 534.193 were the IV series. With later orders the fourth series would occupy the serial numbers .174 and 445 and was therefore the most numerous of the types. The most important change to the earlier series was the enclosed cockpit. The IV series also enjoyed a metal light alloy Letov (Hochfeld) Hd-43 propeller. The various refinements allowed the IV series to have an increased speed of over 200 mph, and this placed it on par with the best of its contemporary biplanes. A common alteration to the IV series was the replacement of the tailskid with a tailwheel. Operational experiences had shown that the spat on the main landing gear could become clogged with mud on grassy airfields and cause takeoff and landing problems. The spats were then often removed.

During 1937, the superb performance of the B-534 was demonstrated at a flying exhibition. The aircraft was tested against the best in the world at the IV International Air Meeting at Zürich's Dübendorf airport. The B-534 entered three of the competitions. The first of these tested climbing and diving. A German Bf 109 took first place and a Henschel Hs 123 pilot pushed his biplane to claim second. The B-534 took the next three positions. The 534 outflew every other fighter participating, bar the Messerschmitt Bf 109 – and even then, the Avia was only 11 km/h slower than the German aircraft.

Allegedly, problems were encountered with the redesign effort to adapt to installation of a newly installed cannon. These were not resolved in the summer of 1938; by this point, Czechoslovakia, sensing rising political tension amongst German claims to Czech-held territory, was eager to get more aircraft in the air, Avia decided to use a third machine gun in the nose. Judging by the size of the gun magazine, the nose machine gun was matched with an increased supply of ammunition. For the nation, time was running out and drew to Munich Diktat, at which point Germany commenced its occupation of the Sudetenland (the western border area of Czechoslovakia). Two series Bk-534 were produced, cn's 501 – 554 (63, for Czechoslovak air force), and cn's 555 – 620. Only three of the second batch were completed for the Czechoslovak air force, and the remaining 63 aeroplanes from this production block were finished for the Germans, after the German invasion of the remainder of Czechoslovakia on 15 March 1939.

== Design ==
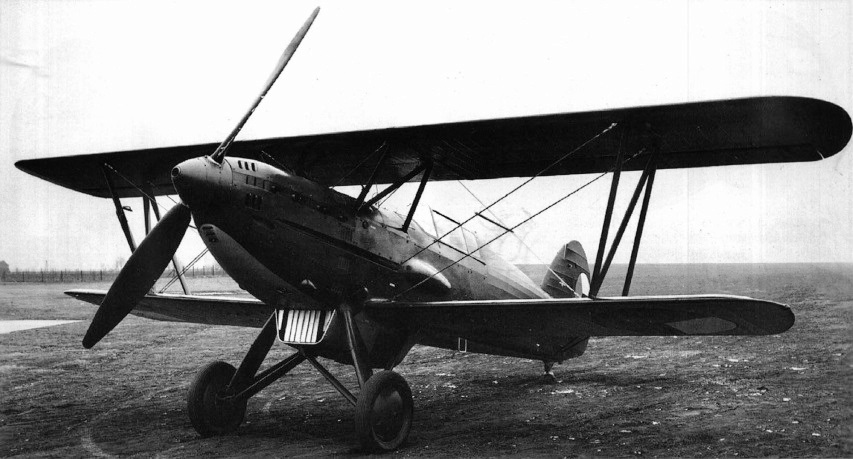
Bk-534

The Avia B-534 was a single-seat unequal-span biplane fighter aircraft. The fuselage used a rectangular structure composed of steel tubes, which were attached together using a mixture of bolts and rivets and braced together using streamline wires. The wing, which had a riveted steel structure and fabric covering, was attached to the fuselage using N struts; similar struts were present in the outer section of the wings attaching the wings together. The forward section of the fuselage was covered with detachable metal panels, while the rear section had a fabric covering.

Production aircraft were exclusively powered by the Hispano-Suiza 12Y 12-cylinder water-cooled engine, rated to produce a maximum of 850 hp, which was built under licence by Avia. The total fuel capacity was 70 gallons (320 litres); a combined cooler and oil tank was installed beneath the fuselage, while a water-based radiator was also set below the engine. Engine ignition was provided via the cockpit, along with automated fire-fighting equipment. Other cockpit equipment included a radio set, oxygen provision, and an adjustable seat and cockpit cover. Early-built aircraft featured an open cockpit, while later-built examples were furnished with an enclosed cockpit.

The B-534 was furnished with a monoplane tailplane, composed of steel and covered by fabric; similar construction methods were used for the fin and rudder. Both the rudder and the elevator were statically and aerodynamically balanced. The undercarriage was of a split-type configuration, being oleo-sprung and equipped with Dunlop-built wheels. The wheels, which were housed within streamlined fairings, were fitted with brakes; for conducting operations under winter conditions, skis could also be fitted to the undercarriage. According to reports from pilots who flew the B-534, it possessed excellent handling characteristics for the era.

The Bk-534 was designed to carry one 20 mm (0.79 in) Oerlikon FFS-20 cannon firing through the nose, along with a pair of 7.92 mm (0.312 in) machine guns to the sides of the fuselage. By the summer of 1938, Czechoslovakia, sensing rising political tension caused by German claims to Czechoslovak border territory, was eager to get more aircraft in the service, thus Avia decided to use a third machine gun in the nose. However, there have been claims that the company had encountered substantial difficulties in adapting the aircraft to accommodate the additional weapon and these were not quickly resolved. Judging by the size of the gun magazine, the nose machine gun was matched with an increased supply of ammunition. Consequently, however, the fuel load was decreased

== Operational history ==
=== Czechoslovakia ===
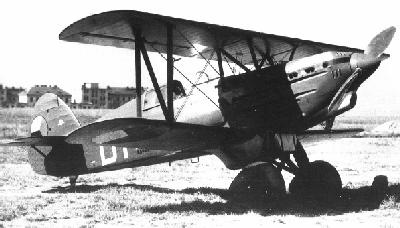
Avia B-534, 42nd letka (squadron)

Upon its introduction to squadron service with the Czechoslovak Air Force during the latter half of 1935, the B-534 was put to use in the interceptor role. Initially, the responsibility for pursuit and aerial combat was shared with several other aircraft, including the Avia BA-33L and the Letov Š-31; however, by 1938, the B-534 was the sole type of aircraft in Czech service to be tasked with this role. By 10 November 1938, a total of 370 B-534 and Bk-534 aircraft in service; additionally, 53 aircraft had been written off as a result of accidents.

On 1 September 1938, less than a month before the Munich Agreement would cause Czechoslovakia to lose 30 per cent of its territory and 34 per cent of its population, 328 B-534s and Bk-534s equipped 21 fighter squadrons of the Czechoslovak Air Force, while other aircraft were assigned to reserve and training squadrons, and deliveries continuing of the final batch of fighters.

On 14 March 1939, Germany forced the partition of Czechoslovakia, with Slovakia being declared as the nominally independent Slovak Republic with Germany annexing the remaining "Czech" part of Czechoslovakia as the Protectorate of Bohemia and Moravia the next day. The abrupt partition of Czechoslovakia during 1939 prevented any actual combat operations of the B-534 to be conducted by the nation that had produced it. By then, high performance monoplanes such as the Bf 109 and Britain's leading models – the Hawker Hurricane and Supermarine Spitfire – were raising the bar of fighter/interceptor standards. The Slovak Air Force was organised out of the units of the Czechoslovak Air Force that were based in Slovakia at the time of partition, and inherited about 71 B-534s and Bk-534s.

Slovakia had to quickly make use of its newly formed air force, weakened by the departure of many Czech pilots, to defend itself when neighbouring Hungary launched an invasion on 23 March 1939. During the ensuing combat, a pair of B-534s were shot down by Hungarian anti-aircraft fire while a further four were claimed to have been shot down by Hungarian Fiat CR.32 fighters. Another Avia was compelled to perform a forced landing behind Hungarian lines and was captured.

During September 1939, Slovakia participated in the German Invasion of Poland; the nation held the aim of regaining territories which had been previously lost to Poland at Munich. A pair of squadrons of B-534s were assigned to support the invasion. In the theatre, these were typically used to escort Luftwaffe aircraft, such as the Junkers Ju 87 dive-bomber, on eight missions. On 6 September the Avias shot down a Polish Lublin R.XIIID reconnaissance airplane over Prešov, killing its two-men crew. One Avia was shot down by Polish anti-aircraft cannons, the other one crashed on 9 September (a pilot was killed). Also the downing of Polish RWD-8 liaison aircraft fleeing to Hungary was reported.

The same squadrons fought alongside the elements of the German military in the area of Ukraine during summer 1941. According to aviation author Josef Krybus, on this front, morale amongst the Slovak pilots was low and no significant victories were achieved during their deployment. During 1942, one of these squadrons was redeployed to Slovakia to conduct anti-partisan operations. Over time, a combination of obsolescence, the lack of spare components and the old Czechoslovak air force's proprietary fuel mixture (BiBoLi, or some other mix of ethanol, benzol and petrol) finally relegated the surviving B-534s to performing the trainer role and other secondary duties during 1943.

The training role would have been the last operational service of the B-534s in Slovak colours if not for the Slovak National Uprising of September–October 1944. The rest of the Slovak air assets did not turn-coat as expected and the leaders of the uprising were faced with using a rag-tag collection of leftover aircraft, including several B-534s stationed at Tri Duby airfield. On 2 September 1944, Master Sergeant František Cyprich, just after testing a repaired B-534, downed a Junkers Ju 52 transport under Hungarian colours on its way to a base in occupied Poland. This was at once the first aerial victory for the Uprising and the last recorded biplane fighter air-to-air victory. As the Slovak National Uprising was desperate for available aircraft, Sergeant Cyprich was derided by his colonel for not trying to force the Junkers Ju 52 to land and be captured instead. The last pair of B-534s at Tri Duby were burned as the base was evacuated on 25 October 1944.

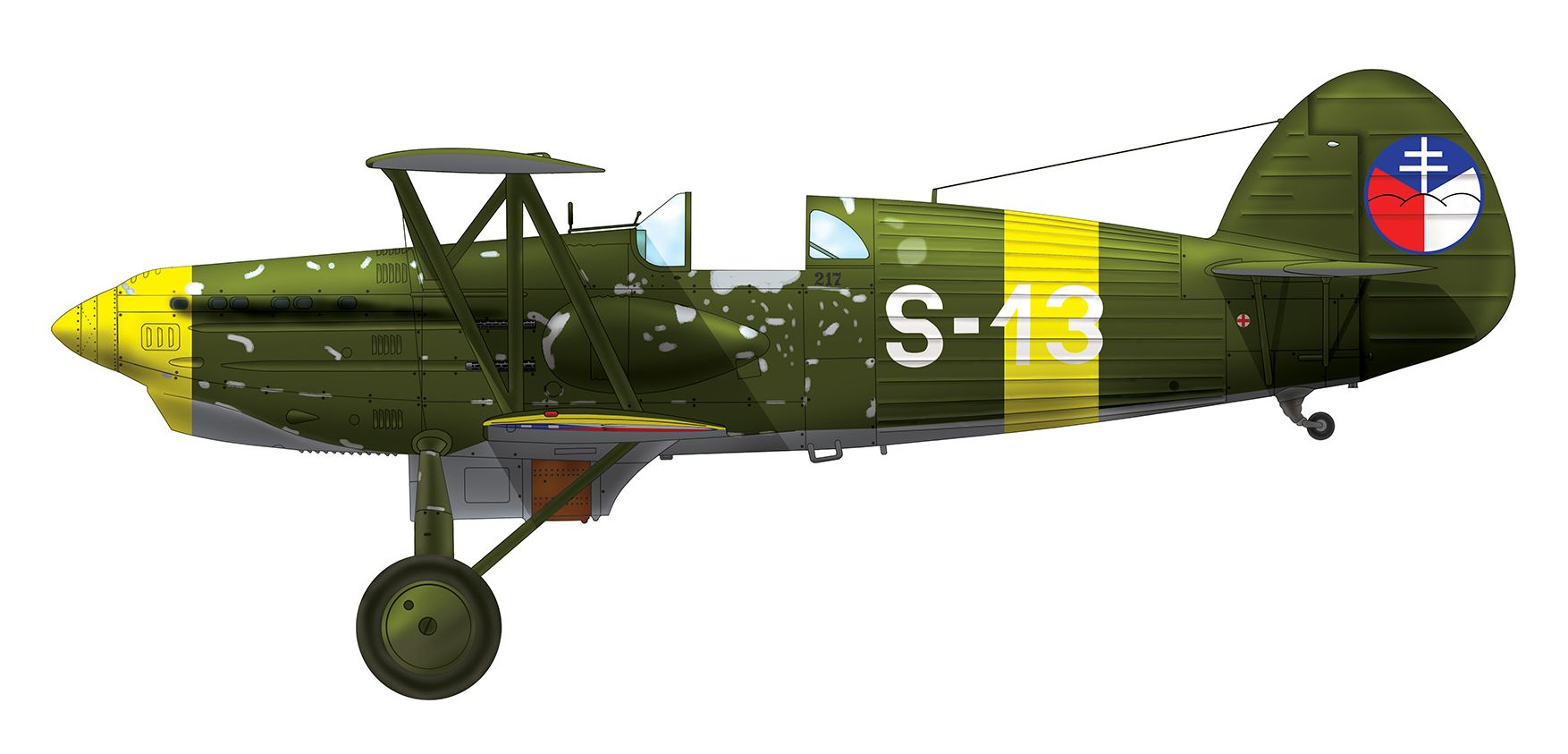
Avia B.534.217 of Combined Squadron, in which Frantisek Cyprich shot down a Hungarian Junkers Ju 52/3m, September 2nd, 1944

=== Bulgaria ===
During 1939, Bulgaria opted to procure a batch of 78 B-534s, well after the enactment of the Czech partition, from Germany, who had captured a large number of the type. The last batch of these aircraft were delivered from Czechoslovakia during March 1942. On 1 August 1943, 48 of these aircraft were able to make two passes at American Consolidated B-24 Liberator bombers returning from the raid on Ploieşti. Hits were scored but no B-24s were shot down and some of the B-534s that received damage in the combat, broke up on landing.

The B-534s saw little use as frontline aircraft as Bulgaria had also procured the more capable Bf 109E and the French-built Dewoitine D.520 monoplane fighters. After the anti-German coup of 9 September 1944, Bulgaria switched sides overnight. As such its B-534s were quickly pressed into use to conduct ground attacks against German units. On 10 September 1944, a flight of six B-534s were involved in a brief melee with six German Bf 109s at low altitude. One B-534 was lost, but the Germans quickly broke off, wary of both the low altitude and the B-534's manoeuvrability.

=== Other operators ===
During 1937, a batch of 14 B-534s was supplied to Yugoslavia; some of these aircraft were still in service when Germany launched the Invasion of Yugoslavia in early 1941. During 1937, a handful of fighters were delivered from Czechoslovakia to Greece, additional Greek B-534s appear to have been acquired from Yugoslavia as well. During 1940–1941, these fighters were later used during the Greco-Italian War as part of efforts by Greece to resist the invading Axis forces.

Following Germany's forced annexation of the remaining "Czech" part of Czechoslovakia as the Protectorate of Bohemia and Moravia on 15 March 1939, large numbers of captured B-534s were pressed into the Luftwaffe. In German service, the type was heavily used as a fighter-trainer at several fighter pilot training schools; another major use was as a glider-tug and target tug, which involved those B-534s involved being outfitted with cables and release-gear.

Germany was also interested in potentially using the B-534 as a carrier-based aircraft. In order to evaluate its suitability for such a role, three aircraft were equipped with tailhook and underwent structural strengthening before the commencement of a flight test programme; however, none of Germany's aircraft carriers, the Graf Zeppelin-class, were ever completed. The B-534 also featured in the German propaganda movie Kampfgeschwader Luetzow in which the type was used as a stand-in for Polish PZL P.11, being painted in Polish Air Force markings.

Germany also sold a number of the captured B-534s to its allies, reportedly at 40 per cent of their original cost. Following the German occupation of Yugoslavia in 1941, the Axis-aligned Croatian Air Force was created and supplied with B-534s by Germany, as well as the integration of remaining examples from Yugoslavia's own B-534s ordered prior to the outbreak of the conflict.

== Variants ==
- B-534/1: First prototype.
- B-534/2: Second prototype.
- B-534-I: First production version. (cn's 2 – 101)
- B-534-II: (cn's 102 – 147)
- B-534-III: (cn's 148 – 173)
- B-534-IV: Closed canopy (cn's 174 – 445)
- Bk-534: Cannon version (cn's 501 – 620)

== Surviving aircraft ==
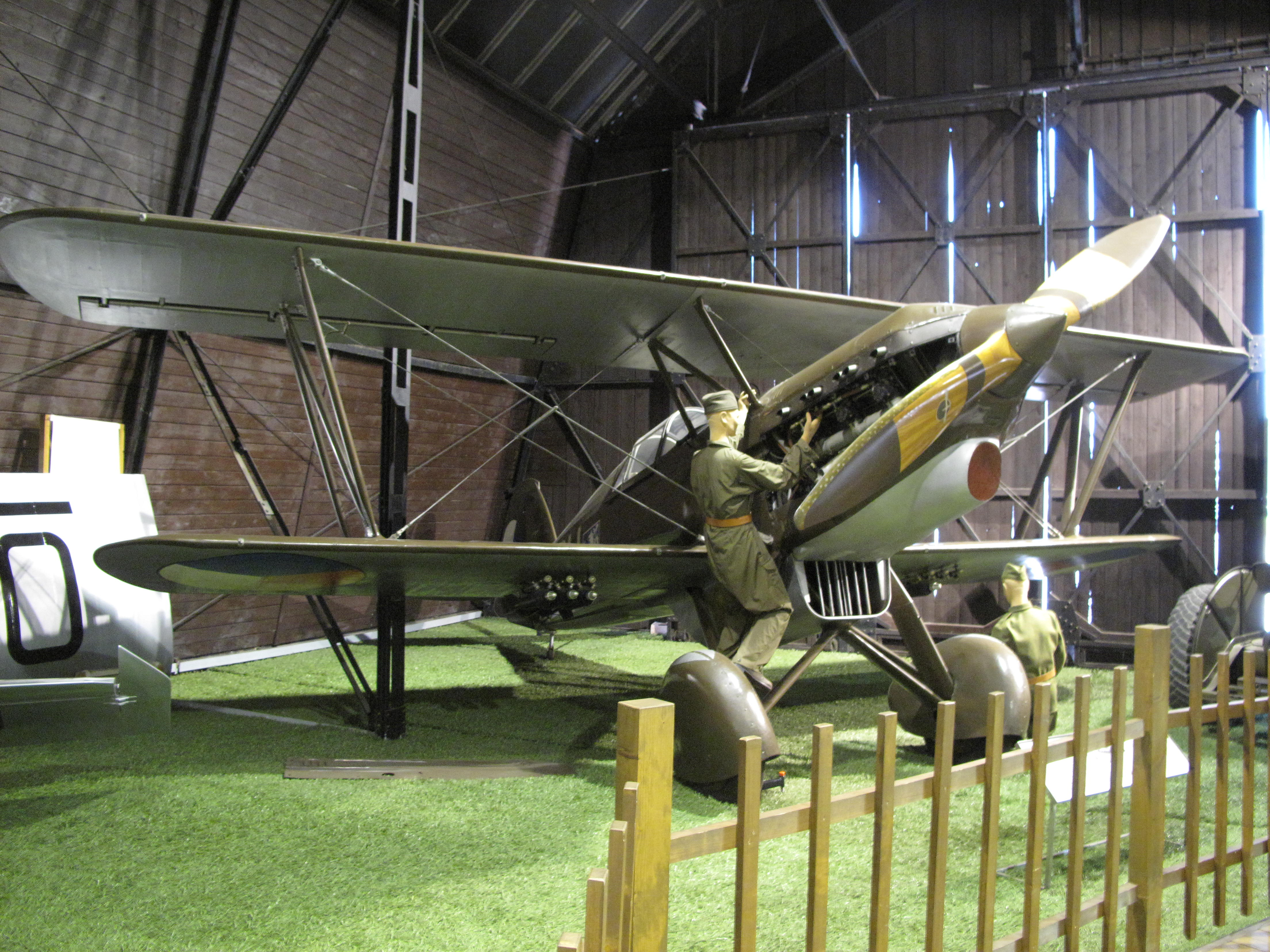
A replica B-534 at the Prague Aviation Museum, Kbely

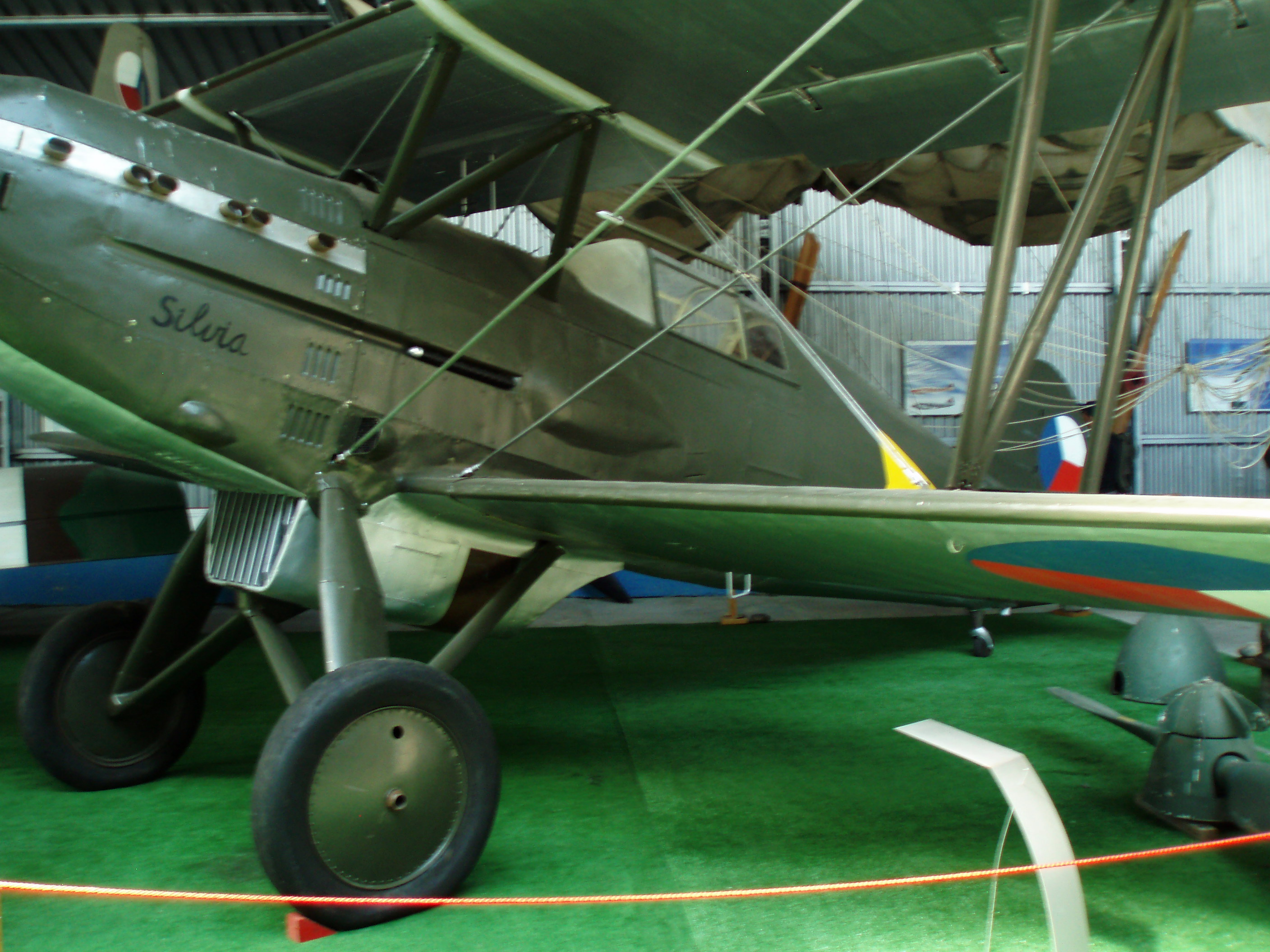
A replica B-534 (pre-war Czechoslovak Air Force) at the Museum of Aviation, Košice, Slovakia

There are no real surviving airframes, but a B-534-IV replica is on display in the Prague Aviation Museum, Kbely, Czech Republic. A second replica (Bk-534), using (like the Kbely example) some original parts, is displayed at the Museum of Aviation at Košice International Airport, Slovakia.

== Operators ==
Bulgaria: Bulgarian Air Force – The Bulgarian Air Force operated between 48 and 100 aircraft (though mostly the number 78 is named), which they called "Dogan" (Hunting Hawk).

Croatia: Air Force of the Independent State of Croatia – An unknown number of Avia B-534 aircraft were supplied by the Germans.

Czechoslovakia: Czechoslovak Air Force

Germany: Luftwaffe – The German Luftwaffe used most of the airframes confiscated from the Czechs. These aircraft served through the early years of the war as trainers, night fighters, and glider tugs; three were used to test carrier landing operations for the aborted German aircraft carrier Graf Zeppelin. The Germans had another use as well: B-534s also starred, disguised as Polish fighters, in a German propaganda film, "Kampfgeschwader Lützow".

Greece: Hellenic Air Force – Greek businessman Giorgos Koutarellis, a millionaire expatriate living in Egypt, bought two B-534s and presented them to the Greek government in August 1936. They were lost in the chaos of 1941.

Hungary: Royal Hungarian Air Force – One B-534 was captured by the Hungarians during the border war in 1939 and tested for a period, carrying the code HA-VAB, later serialled G.192. The Hungarians concluded that the B-534 was an inferior aircraft to their existing fighters. In 1943 the B-534 was handed over to the Gliding and Aero Club at Győr, and was destroyed in 1945 when the Soviet Army overran the area.

Romania:Together with three DFS 230 gliders, Romania received an unknown number of Avia B-534 tugs according to one source.

Slovak Republic (1939–1945): Slovak Air Force – The Slovak Air Force operated several B-534s from Czechoslovakia.

- Slovak Insurgent Air Force

Soviet Union: A number (eight is given in some sources) of B-534s were allegedly used by the Soviets in a secret NKVD squadron to shadow flights of German aircraft.

== Specifications (B-534 IV) ==
Avia B-534 3-view

Data from Aircraft of the Third Reich Vol.1

General characteristics

- Crew: one
- Length: 8.1 m (26 ft 7 in)
- Wingspan: 9.4 m (30 ft 10 in)
- Height: 3.15 m (10 ft 4 in)
- Wing area: 23.56 m^{2} (253.6 sq ft)
- Empty weight: 1,460 kg (3,219 lb)
- Gross weight: 2,120 kg (4,674 lb)
- Max takeoff weight: 1,980 kg (4,365 lb)
- Powerplant: 1 × Hispano-Suiza 12Ydrs liquid-cooled V12 engine, 633 kW (849 hp)

Performance

- Maximum speed: 405 km/h (252 mph, 219 kn) at 4,400 m (14,400 ft) (standard 380 km/h)
- Cruise speed: 345 km/h (214 mph, 186 kn)
- Range: 600 km (370 mi, 320 nmi)
- Service ceiling: 10,600 m (34,800 ft)
- Rate of climb: 15.15 m/s (2,980 ft/min)
- Time to altitude: 5,000 m (16,000 ft) in 5 minutes 30 seconds
- Wing loading: 84 kg/m^{2} (17 lb/sq ft)
- Power/mass: 0.32 kW/kg (0.2 hp/lb)

Armament

- Guns: 4× 7.92 mm (0.312 in) Letecky kulomet vz. 30 (Česká zbrojovka Strakonice) machine guns with 250–300 rpg
- Bombs: 6× 10 kg (22 lb) or 4x 20 kg (44 lb) bombs

== See also ==
Related development

- Avia B-34

Aircraft of comparable role, configuration, and era

- Blériot-SPAD S.510
- Fiat CR.32
- Fiat CR.42
- Grumman F3F
- Hawker Fury
- Heinkel He 51
- Kawasaki Ki-10
- Polikarpov I-15

Related lists

- List of fighter aircraft
- List of interwar military aircraft
