= Praga BH-44 =

BH-44
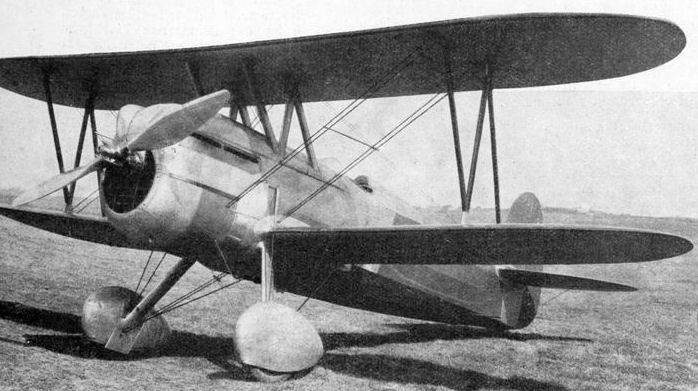

General information
- Type: Fighter aircraft
- National origin: Czechoslovakia
- Manufacturer: ČKD-Praga
- Status: Prototype only
- Number built: 2

History
- First flight: 19 July 1932

The Praga BH-44 (designated E-44 by the Czechoslovak Air Force) was a prototype Czechoslovak fighter biplane of the early 1930s. Only two were built, the rival Avia B-34 being ordered instead.

== Design and development ==
In 1932, ČKD-Praga, the aircraft department of the Czechoslovak company Praga, entered a competition to design a new fighter for the Czechoslovak Air Force, with its design, the BH-44, competing against designs from Avia (the B-34) and Letov (the Š-231).

The BH-44 was a single-bay biplane of mixed construction, with wooden wings and a fabric covered, steel-tube fuselage. Powerplant was a single Praga ESV water-cooled V12 engine.

The first prototype made its maiden flight on 19 July 1932. Performance was unimpressive, as the engine delivered only 370 kilowatts (500 hp) instead of the promised 560 kilowatts (750 hp).

A second prototype (sometimes called the EH-144), fitted with a supercharged Praga ESVK engine, flew in April 1934, but performance remained disappointing. The first prototype was therefore re-engined with a 480 kilowatts (650 hp) Rolls-Royce Kestrel VII, flying in this form on 30 October 1934, and as such was evaluated by the Czechoslovak Air Force as the E-44.

The imported Kestrel engine worked poorly with the fuel used by the Air Force, however, and the type was rejected, the B-34 being purchased instead.

== Specifications (ESV engine, performance estimated) ==
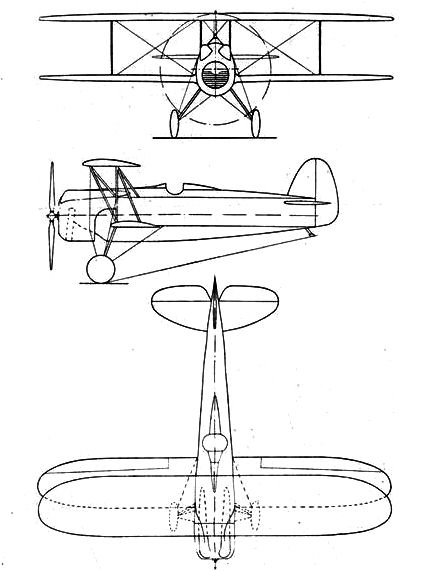
Praga BH-44 3-view drawing from L'Aerophile February 1934

Data from The Complete Book of Fighters.

General characteristics

- Crew: 1
- Length: 7.62 m (25 ft 0 in)
- Wingspan: 9.25 m (30 ft 4 in)
- Wing area: 23.14 m^{2} (249.1 sq ft)
- Empty weight: 1,462 kg (3,223 lb)
- Gross weight: 1,837 kg (4,050 lb)
- Powerplant: 1 × Praga ESV water-cooled V12 engine, 560 kW (750 hp) (predicted power - actual power 370 kW (500 hp))

Performance

- Maximum speed: 330 km/h (210 mph, 180 kn)
- Endurance: 1.8 hours
- Time to altitude: 5.2 minutes to 3,000 m (9,800 ft)

== See also ==
Aircraft of comparable role, configuration, and era

- Avia B-34
- Letov Š-31
