= Slovak Air Force (1939–1945) =

Air force of the Slovak Republic

The Slovak Air Force (Slovak: Slovenské vzdušné zbrane, or SVZ), between 1939 and 1945, was the air force of the short-lived World War II Slovak Republic. Its mission was to provide air support at fronts, and to protect Bratislava and metropolitan areas against enemy air attack.

== History ==
One of the SVZ's first air battles was in the Slovak–Hungarian War in March 1939 in which Hungary occupied Carpathian Ruthenia and parts of southern Slovakia. In this the SVZ suffered some losses against Royal Hungarian Air Force. The SVZ also took part in the German Invasion of Poland.

The SVZ took part in Axis offensives in the Ukraine and Russian Central front sectors of the Eastern Front under the lead of Luftwaffe in the Stalingrad and Caucasus operations. The engagement in the cost it great losses of aircraft and personnel.

For the rest of the war the SVZ fought US Army Air Forces and Royal Air Force raids against Slovakia.

The symbol of the Slovak air force was a blue and white cross similar to the German Balkenkreuz, with a red disc in the centre. It was carried on the tail and wings. Engine covers were painted yellow and there was a vertical line on the fuselage.

Training aircraft were supplied by Germany and Italy. To defend Slovak air space, the air force used Messerschmitt Bf 109 (E and G types), Avia B-534, and some other interceptor types. It was also helped by Luftwaffe units active in the area.

When Romania and the Soviet Union entered Slovakia, with some captured aircraft and defectors they organized a local Insurgent Air Force to continue the fight against Axis forces in country. Others served voluntarily in Luftwaffe units; later these air units were integrated to the reconstituted Czechoslovak Air Force after the end of the war.

== Notable SVZ air aces ==
- Ján Režňák
- Izidor Kovárik
- Ján Gerthofer
- František Cyprich
- František Brezina
- Anton Matúšek
- Jozef Štauder
- Pavol Zeleňák
- Rudolf Božík
- Vladimír Kriško
- Alexander Gerič
- Jozef Jančovič
- František Hanovec
- Rudolf Palatický
- Štefan Martiš
- Juraj Puškár
- Štefan Ocvirk
- Ondrej Ďumbala
- Jozef Drlička
- Martin Danihel
- Ivan Kocka

== Units of the Slovak Air Force ==
- 1st unit of Stíhacia letka (fighter unit), Slovenské vzdušné zbrane, air unit to support the Slovak forces in Russia, Zhytomyr-Kiev, Ukraine, October 1941

== Aircraft of the Slovak Air Force ==
- Arado Ar 96B-5
- Bücker Bü 131B Jungmann
- Bücker Bü 133 Jungmeister
- Bücker Bü 181D Bestmann
- Fieseler Fi 156C-2
- Focke-Wulf Fw 44C Stieglitz
- Focke-Wulf Fw 58C Weihe
- Focke-Wulf Fw 189A-1 Uhu
- Gotha Go 145C
- Heinkel He 72B-1 Kadett
- Heinkel He 111H-3 (5 He 111s were in Slovaks hands 2 were He 111 H-10s and 3 were He 111 H-16s)
- Junkers W 34h (At least 1 confirmed to be in Slovak hands WW2)
- Junkers Ju 52/3m g7e
- Junkers Ju 87D-3 (10 Ju 87D-3s were in Slovak hands in WW2)
- Klemm Kl 35D
- Messerschmitt Bf 109E-7 (30 planes in Slovak hands WW2)
- Messerschmitt Bf 109G-6 (30 planes in Slovak hands WW2)
- Siebel Fh 104 Hallore
- Siebel Si 204A
- Avia B-71 (single Avia B-71 aircraft until April 18, 1943, when čtk Anton Vanko and four other airmen defected with it to Turkey)
- Avia B.122 (~65 in Slovak service)
- Avia BH-33E
- Avia B-534
- Aero A.100
- Aero Ab-101
- Aero A.300
- Aero A.304
- Aero AP-32
- Beneš-Mráz Be-50 Beta-Minor
- Letov Š-231
- Letov Š-328
- Praga E-39
- Praga A/B-32 Pardubitz
- Praga E-51
- Praga E-210
- Praga E-240
- Zlín Z-XV
- Zlín Z-XII
- Caudron C.445 Goeland
- Avro 626
- Savoia-Marchetti SM.84bis (10 in Slovak hands WW2)

These were primarily assigned to Letecky Pluk (Air Regiment) 3 and numbered 79 Avia B-534 and 11 Bk-534 biplane fighters, 73 Letov S-328 biplane observation, and 15 Aero A-100 and Ab-101 biplane reconnaissance aircraft plus a miscellany of trainers and other minor types. However, it also had three bombers, a Bloch MB-200, a Fokker F.VII and a Avia B-71, a license-built copy of the SB-2 light bomber. Such a large number of Czech airmen departed for the German-occupied Protectorate of Bohemia-Moravia that the Slovaks were forced to reduce the numbers of squadrons to more sustainable levels. The original 5 fighter pletky (squadrons) were reduced to 3, numbers 11, 12, and 13 while the 7 original reconnaissance and observation pletky were consolidated into 3, numbered 1st, 2nd, and 3rd.

== Photo gallery ==
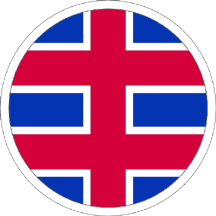
World War II Slovak aircraft marking
(1939–1941)

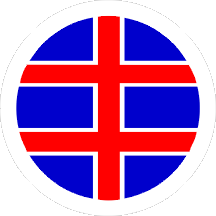
World War II Slovak aircraft marking
(1939–1941)

World War II Slovak aircraft marking
(1939–1941), Slovak aircraft carried both Slovak and German roundels during the Polish campaign

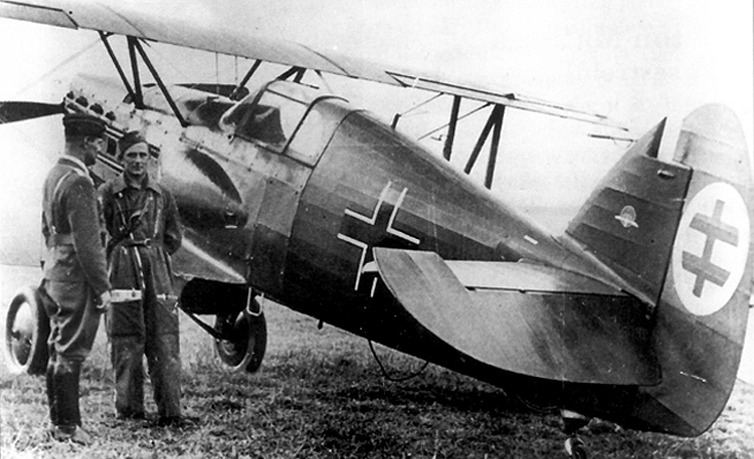
Slovak and a German pilot stand next to an Avia B-534 of the Slovak Air Force at the end of the Polish campaign

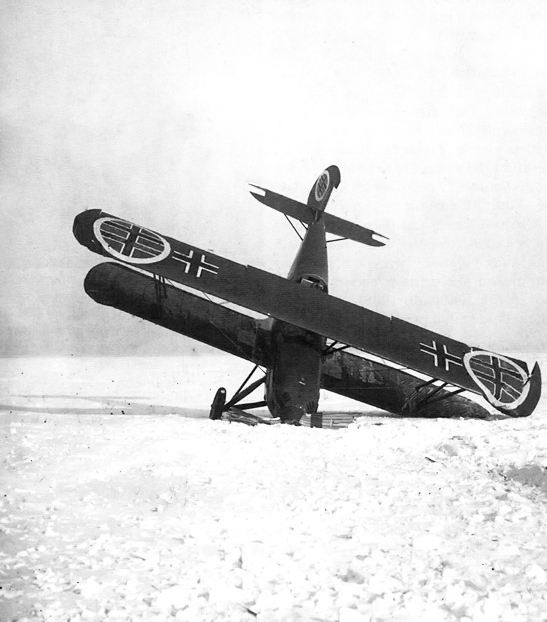
A crash landed Slovak Avia B-534. During the Polish campaign and the ‘Phoney War’ period, Slovak aircraft carried dual roundels

World War II Slovak aircraft marking
(1941–1945)

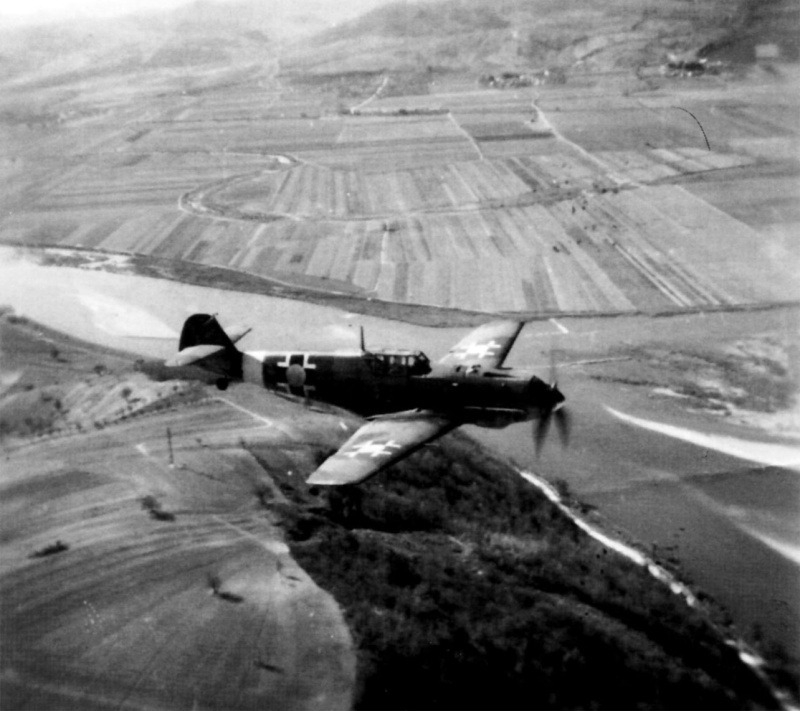
Messerschmitt Bf 109E of the Slovak Air Force over Slovakia

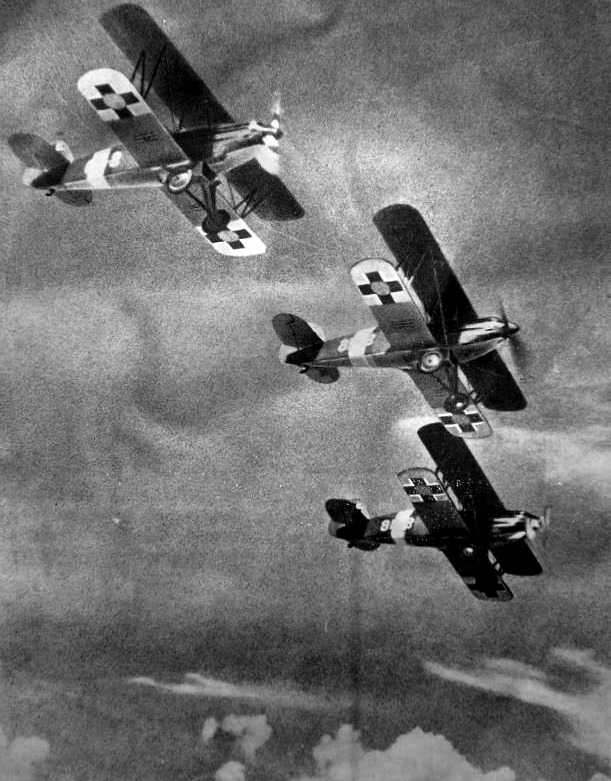
Three Avia B-534 flying in formation

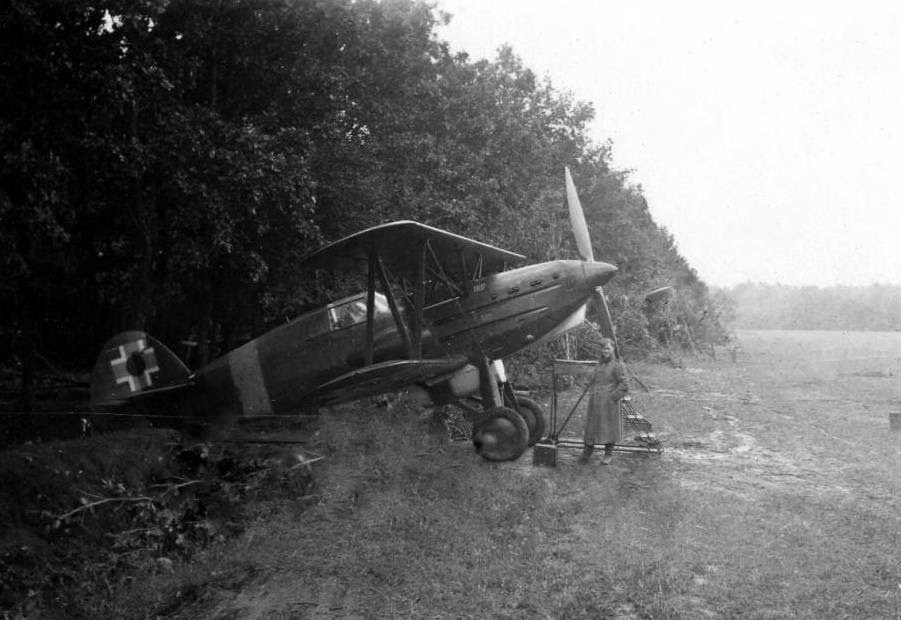
Slovak Pilot next to an Avia B-534 aircraft of the Slovak Air Force concealed on the Eastern Front

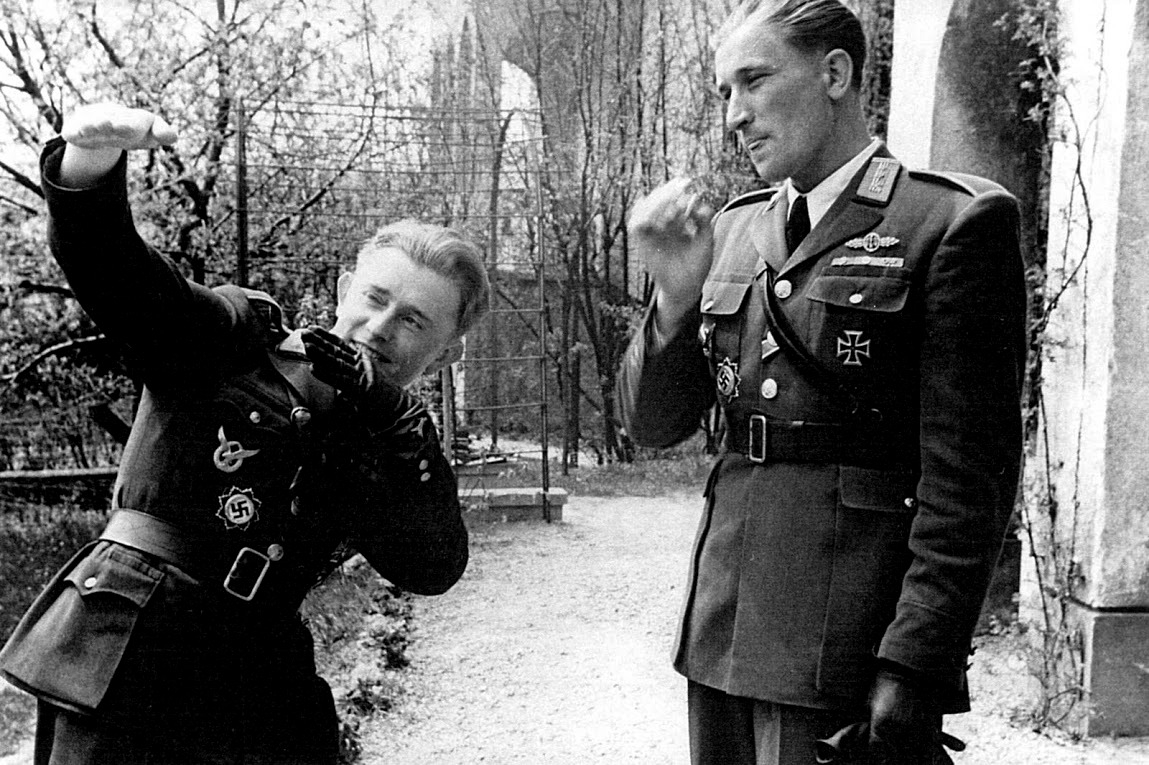
Best aces of the Slovak Air Force, Ján Režňák (left) and Izidor Kovárik after being awarded the German Cross in gold, 1944

== See also ==
- Czechoslovak Air Force
- Slovak Air Force
