= Heinkel He 72 Kadett =

1930s German trainer aircraft

He 72 Kadett
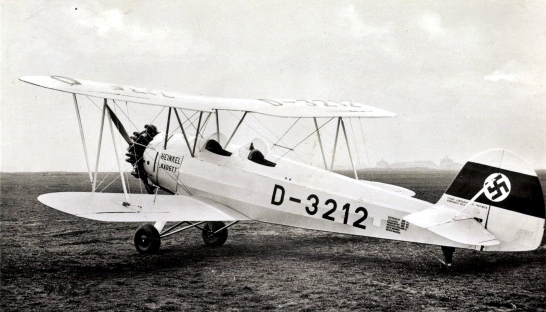

General information
- Type: Military basic trainer
- Manufacturer: Heinkel Flugzeugwerke
- Status: Retired
- Primary users: Luftwaffe National Socialist Flyers Corps; Slovak Air Force (1939–1945)
- Number built: Several thousand

History
- First flight: 1933

The Heinkel He 72 Kadett (Cadet) was a German single-engine biplane trainer of the 1930s. It was known to its pilots as the Zitterrochen (Quivering Ray) as it shook madly.

== Development ==
The Kadett was designed in 1933 to meet an official requirement for a basic trainer. It was a single-bay biplane of fabric-covered, metal construction with open cockpits, a staggered wing, a strut-braced tail unit, and fixed tailskid undercarriage. The prototype was powered by a 104 kW (139 hp) Argus As 8B air-cooled inline engine.

The first production model, the He 72A retained the As 8B engine in early batches, but later production aircraft had a 112 kW (150 hp) As 8R. The He 72A was superseded by the He 72B, which was the major production version. This was powered by a 120 kW (160 bhp) Siemens-Halske Sh 14A radial.

The He 72B was produced as the He 72B-1 landplane and He 72BW Seekadett ("Sea Cadet") twin-float seaplane. The civil development was the He 72B-3 Edelkadett ("Noble Cadet").

== Operational history ==
The Kadett entered service with National Socialist Flyers Corps before the formation of the Luftwaffe. Later, it became a standard basic trainer with the Luftwaffe. Slovak forces used it in the attack role.

== Variants ==
- He 72A Kadett : Initial production version.
- He 72B :
- He 72B-1 :
- He 72B-3 Edelkadett : Civil adaptation of He 72B-1. 30 built.
- He 72BW Seekadett : Twin-float seaplane. Prototype only.
- He 172 - He 72B with NACA cowling. Prototype only in 1934.

== Operators ==
Bulgaria

- Bulgarian Air Force

Czechoslovakia

- Czechoslovak Air Force (postwar)

Germany

- National Socialist Flyers Corps
- Luftwaffe

Japan

- Imperial Japanese Navy - one aircraft

Slovakia

- Slovak Air Force (1939–1945)
- Slovak Insurgent Air Force

== Specifications (He 72B) ==
Data from Die Deutsche Luftrüstung 1933–1945 Vol.2 – Flugzeugtypen Erla-Heinkel

General characteristics

- Crew: 2
- Length: 7.5 m (24 ft 7 in)
- Wingspan: 9 m (29 ft 6 in)
- Height: 2.7 m (8 ft 10 in)
- Wing area: 20.7 m^{2} (223 sq ft)
- Empty weight: 540 kg (1,190 lb)
- Max takeoff weight: 865 kg (1,907 lb)
- Fuel capacity: 110 L (29 US gal; 24 imp gal)
- Powerplant: 1 × BMW-Bramo Siemens-Halske Sh 14A 7-cylinder air-cooled radial piston engine 160 PS (160 hp; 120 kW)
- Propellers: 2-bladed fixed-pitch propeller, 2.2 m (7 ft 3 in) diameter

Performance

- Maximum speed: 194 km/h (121 mph, 105 kn) at 1,000 m (3,300 ft)
- Cruise speed: 158 km/h (98 mph, 85 kn)
- Landing speed: 80 km/h (50 mph; 43 kn)
- Range: 820 km (510 mi, 440 nmi)
- Service ceiling: 4,200 m (13,800 ft)
- Rate of climb: 3 m/s (590 ft/min)
- Time to altitude: 2,000 m (6,600 ft) in 14 minutes

== See also ==
Aircraft of comparable role, configuration, and era

- Bücker Bü 131 Jungmann
- de Havilland DH82 Tiger Moth
- Tachikawa Ki-17

== Bibliography ==
- Sinnhuber, Karl (2012). Salzburg To Stalingrad. UK: Milton Keynes. ISBN 9781471702228.
