= Sliač =

Sliač Szliács
- Municipality
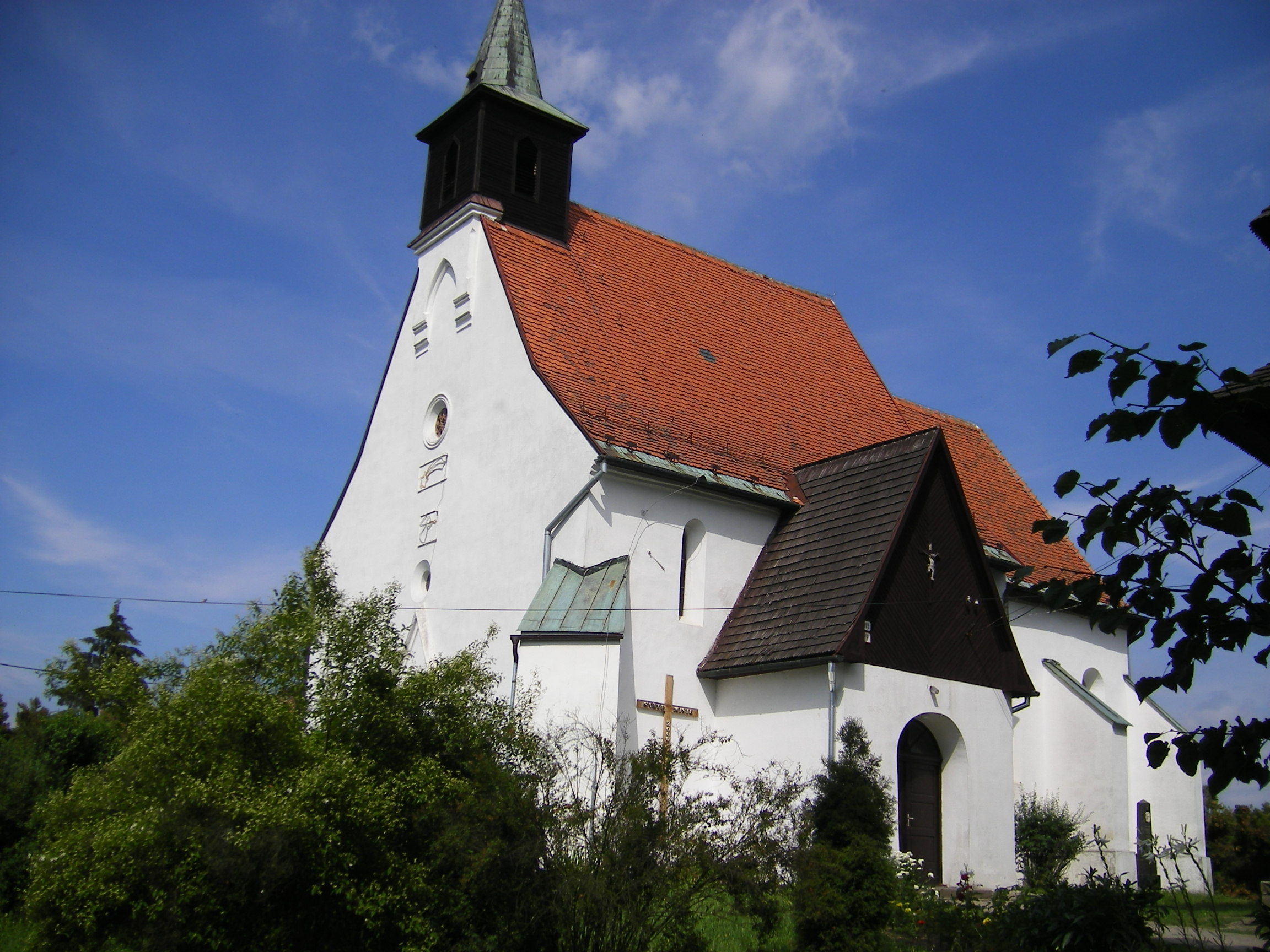

- Flag Coat of arms

- Location of Sliač in the Banská Bystrica Region Location of Sliač in Slovakia
- Coordinates: 48.61°N 19.14°E
- Country: Slovakia
- Region: Banská Bystrica Region
- District: Zvolen District
- First mentioned: 1250

Area
  - Total: 39.83 km^{2} (15.38 sq mi)
- Elevation: 329 m (1,079 ft)

Population (2025)
  - Total: 4,806
- Time zone: UTC+1 (CET)
  - Summer (DST): UTC+2 (CEST)
- Postal code: 962 31
- Area code: +421 45
- Vehicle registration plate (until 2022): ZV
- Website: www.sliac.sk

Sliač (Hungarian: Szliács) is a small spa town located in central Slovakia, on the Hron river, between Banská Bystrica and Zvolen. The town is known for its healing hot springs and for an airport which has been used for military as well as civil purposes. Sliač has a population of less than 5,000.

== Geography ==
The municipality lies at an altitude of 329 metres (1,079 ft) and covers an area of 39.83 km^{2} (15.38 sq mi) (2025).

== History ==
The town arose through a merger of two villages, Hájniky and Rybáre, in 1959 and was given the name "Sliač". However, both original settlements are much older. The Gothic church in Hájniky was mentioned for the first time in 1263 (when the territory belonged to the Kingdom of Hungary) and there is archaeological evidence of Slavic settlers living in the area since the 6th century. Some evidence also indicates that the history of the settlement stretches to 2000 B.C. Before the establishment of independent Czechoslovakia in 1918, Sliač was part of Zólyom County within the Kingdom of Hungary. From 1939 to 1945, it was part of the Slovak Republic. Sliač Airport, formerly known as Letisko Tri Duby ("Three-Oaks Airport") due to the name of the area it was located in, played a key strategic role during the Slovak National Uprising.

== Climate ==
Climate data for Sliač Airport (1991−2020, extremes 1961–2020)
Month	Jan	Feb	Mar	Apr	May	Jun	Jul	Aug	Sep	Oct	Nov	Dec	Year
Record high °C (°F)	13.3 (55.9)	17.9 (64.2)	24.7 (76.5)	30.4 (86.7)	32.3 (90.1)	35.8 (96.4)	37.8 (100.0)	37.8 (100.0)	34.5 (94.1)	28.3 (82.9)	21.5 (70.7)	15.5 (59.9)	37.8 (100.0)
Mean daily maximum °C (°F)	0.7 (33.3)	4.6 (40.3)	10.1 (50.2)	17.1 (62.8)	21.8 (71.2)	25.3 (77.5)	27.2 (81.0)	27.2 (81.0)	21.4 (70.5)	14.9 (58.8)	7.9 (46.2)	1.8 (35.2)	15.0 (59.0)
Daily mean °C (°F)	−2.6 (27.3)	−0.6 (30.9)	4.0 (39.2)	10.1 (50.2)	15.0 (59.0)	18.4 (65.1)	20.1 (68.2)	19.4 (66.9)	14.2 (57.6)	8.9 (48.0)	4.1 (39.4)	−1.3 (29.7)	9.1 (48.4)
Mean daily minimum °C (°F)	−6.2 (20.8)	−5.1 (22.8)	−1.1 (30.0)	3.1 (37.6)	7.8 (46.0)	11.6 (52.9)	13.2 (55.8)	12.7 (54.9)	8.5 (47.3)	4.4 (39.9)	0.7 (33.3)	−4.3 (24.3)	3.8 (38.8)
Record low °C (°F)	−30.0 (−22.0)	−27.4 (−17.3)	−26.2 (−15.2)	−7.3 (18.9)	−4.4 (24.1)	−0.2 (31.6)	2.7 (36.9)	0.0 (32.0)	−4.0 (24.8)	−10.8 (12.6)	−22.6 (−8.7)	−26.7 (−16.1)	−30.0 (−22.0)
Average precipitation mm (inches)	45.6 (1.80)	41.7 (1.64)	44.0 (1.73)	44.5 (1.75)	72.2 (2.84)	81.2 (3.20)	91.3 (3.59)	64.4 (2.54)	56.2 (2.21)	62.9 (2.48)	58.9 (2.32)	52.0 (2.05)	714.9 (28.15)
Average precipitation days (≥ 1.0 mm)	7.6	7.1	7.2	6.8	9.8	9.2	9.5	7.2	6.9	7.9	8.6	8.3	96.1
Average snowy days	11.8	9.6	5.8	1.2	0.0	0.0	0.0	0.0	0.0	0.6	4.1	9.3	42.4
Average relative humidity (%)	84.2	77.2	70.6	64.3	65.4	67.1	66.9	68.8	74.5	80.2	83.9	85.8	74.1
Mean monthly sunshine hours	64.1	93.7	151.2	200.9	241.0	247.1	270.7	255.6	172.0	113.4	62.1	52.0	1,923.8
Source: NOAA

== Population ==
Historical population
Year	Pop.	±%
1970	3,500	—
1980	3,976	+13.6%
1991	3,821	−3.9%
2001	4,667	+22.1%
2011	5,117	+9.6%
2021	4,894	−4.4%
Source: Censuses

Population statistic (10 years)
Year	1995	2005	2015	2025
Count	4975	4812	4997	4806
Difference		−3.27%	+3.84%	−3.82%

Population statistic
Year	2024	2025
Count	4788	4806
Difference		+0.37%

It has a population of 4806 people (31 December 2025).

=== Ethnicity ===
Census 2021 (1+ %)
Ethnicity	Number	Fraction
Slovak	4691	95.85%
Not found out	117	2.39%
Czech	94	1.92%
Total	4894	

In year 2021 was 4894 people by ethnicity 4691 as Slovak, 117 as Not found out, 94 as Czech, 30 as Hungarian, 18 as Other, 14 as Russian, 8 as Rusyn, 8 as German, 6 as Italian, 6 as English, 4 as Ukrainian, 4 as Polish, 4 as Moravian, 4 as Bulgarian, 2 as Jewish, 2 as Romani, 2 as Romanian, 1 as Chinese, 1 as Irish, 1 as Serbian, 1 as Silesian, 1 as Canadian, 1 as Iranian, 1 as Greek and 1 as Albanian.

Note on population: The difference values of population numbers in the table "Population statistic" and in the sections "Ethnicity" & "Religion" is caused by the use of various statistical methods.

=== Religion ===
Census 2021 (1+ %)
Religion	Number	Fraction
None	1993	40.72%
Roman Catholic Church	1873	38.27%
Evangelical Church	738	15.08%
Not found out	126	2.57%
Total	4894	

In year 2021 was 4894 people by religion 1993 from None, 1873 from Roman Catholic Church, 738 from Evangelical Church, 126 from Not found out, 41 from Greek Catholic Church, 19 from Ad hoc movements, 17 from Eastern Orthodox Church, 14 from Other, 11 from Baptists Church, 10 from Other and not ascertained christian church, 10 from Christian Congregations in Slovakia, 9 from Buddhism, 7 from Church of the Brethren, 5 from Paganism and natural spirituality, 5 from Seventh-day Adventist Church, 4 from Calvinist Church, 3 from Jehovah's Witnesses, 3 from United Methodist Church, 2 from Apostolic Church, 1 from Jewish community, 1 from Islam, 1 from Hinduism and 1 from Czechoslovak Hussite Church.

== Twin towns — sister cities ==
Sliač is twinned with:

- Přibyslav, Czech Republic
