= Ján Režňák =

Slovak pilot (1919–2007)

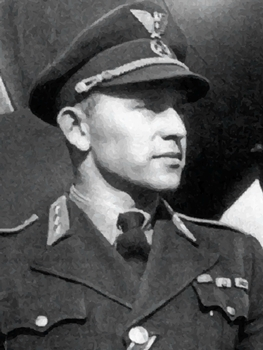
- Ján Režňák in 1944
- Born: 14 April 1919; Jablonica, Czechoslovakia
- Died: 19 September 2007 (aged 88); Martin, Slovakia
- Military career
- Allegiance: Slovak Republic
- Branch: Slovak Air Force (1939–1945)
- Service years: 1941–1945
- Known for: Being Top Slovak Ace in World War II
- Conflicts: World War II; Eastern Front

Ján Režňák (14 April 1919 – 19 September 2007) was a Slovak war pilot. He was the top Slovak fighter ace in the Slovak Air Force during the Second World War. He accumulated 32 kills on the Eastern Front against the Soviet Union. He flew for the German Luftwaffe.
