= Štefan Martiš =

Slovak ace fighter pilot

Stefan Martis (1918–1987) was a Slovak ace fighter pilot from then-Czechoslovakia in World War II. He served in the Slovak Air Force (SVZ) on the Eastern Front.
