= Slovak Resistance Air Force =

Allied air unit during 1944

- Kombinovaná letka
- Roundel of the Slovak Resistance Air Force
- Active: 29 August 1944 – 28 October 1944
- Allegiance: Czechoslovakia
- Type: Air force
- Role: Aerial warfare
- Headquarters: Tri Duby
- Engagements: World War II: Slovak National Uprising

The Slovak Resistance Air Force (in Slovak: Slovenské povstalecké letectvo) was an Allied air unit which fought against Axis forces in Slovakia and participated in the Slovak National Uprising in August–October 1944.

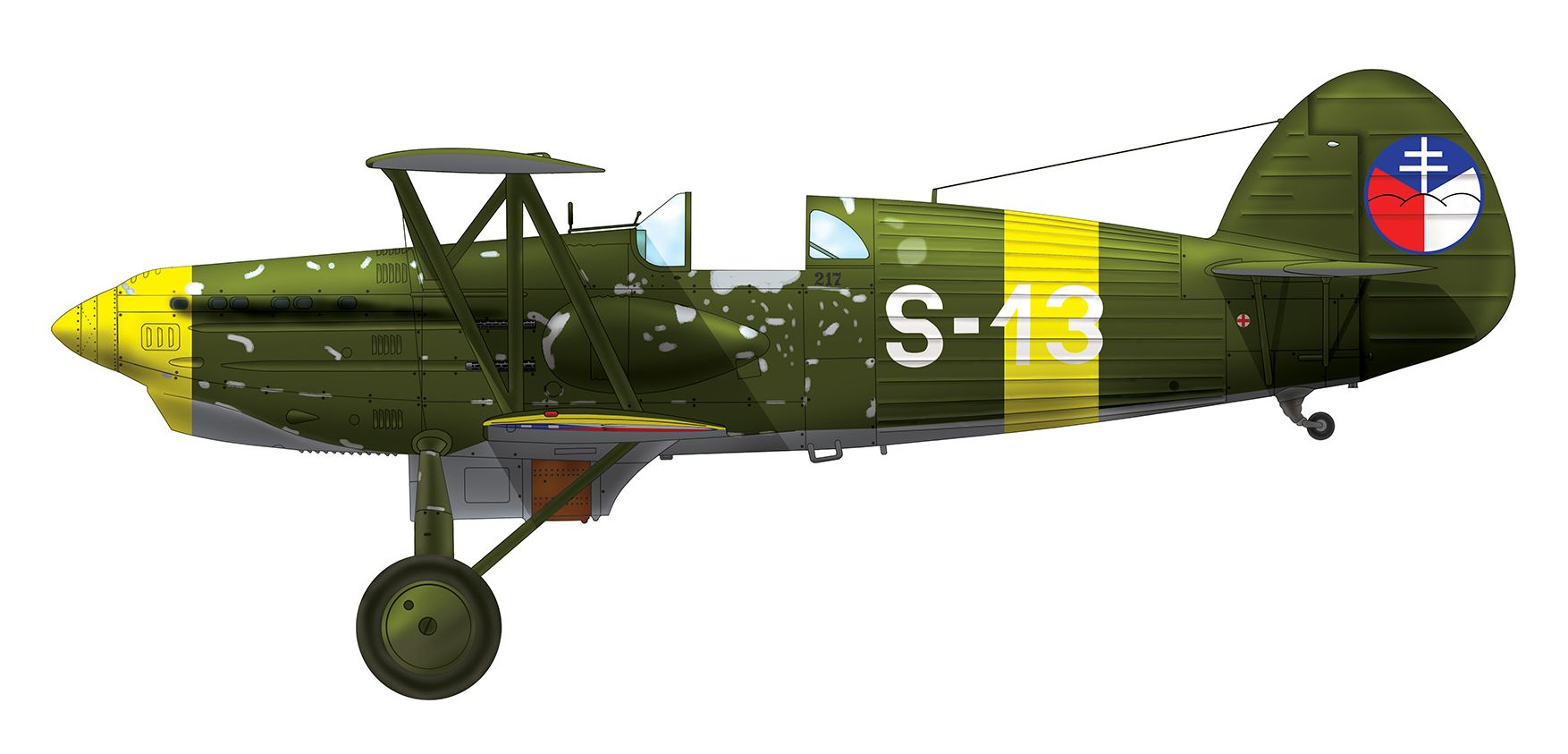
Avia B.534.217 of Combined Squadron, on which Frantisek Cyprich shot down a Hungarian Junkers Ju 52/3m

== History ==
The Slovak National Uprising, organized by Slovak military resistance, began in unfavourable conditions on 29 August 1944. In the first few days the resistance lost major airfields in Piešťany, Spišská Nová Ves, Poprad, Vajnory near Bratislava and Trenčín, but they kept a large area in central Slovakia with Tri Duby airfield (today called Sliač Airport) and a temporary airstrip near Zolná.

All military aircraft of the resistance air force formed a reconnaissance-bomber unit, called the Combined Squadron. It consisted of four Avia B-534 biplane fighters, three older Letov Š-328 light bombers, and two obsolete Bf 109E-4. They were later reinforced by two other Bf 109G-6s and one Focke-Wulf Fw 189, which escaped from eastern Slovakia to the Soviets in Poland, after the resistance army in eastern Slovakia were surrounded and disarmed by Germans. Other aircraft reported to be in resistance hands were two Klemm Kl 35, some Heinkel He 72 Kadett and two Savoia-Marchetti SM.84 medium bombers, captured during combat. The resistance army had trouble supplying their air force, especially ammunition for the German machine-guns of the Bf 109s.

The Soviets provided help for the uprising on 17 September 1944, when they moved the 1st Czechoslovak Fighter Air Regiment under the command of Captain František Fajtl. This unit, flying the Lavochkin La-5FN, consisted of skilled fighter pilots - in particular, Czechoslovak volunteers from the RAF. Resistance pilots flew 923 sorties and destroyed 40 Axis planes. They also flew many reconnaissance flights and attacked ground targets. Air support activity in Slovakia at the end of 1944 was often disrupted by poor weather and low clouds, which made flights in mountainous central Slovakia very risky. Units provided air cover for the uprising from the Zolná and Tri Duby airfields until 25 October 1944. Finally, as the last airfield in insurgent hands, Tri Duby was threatened by artillery fire and the advance of German troops.

As the uprising was overrun by the Germans at the end of October 1944, the commander-in-chief of the resistance army, Rudolf Viest, ordered the Air Force to withdraw from central Slovakia to airfields secured by Red Army in Poland. Most of the pilots joined the 1st Czechoslovak Combined Air Division, which took part in liberating Poland and Czechoslovakia at the beginning of 1945.

== Members of Slovak Resistance Air Force ==
- Rudolf Božík
- František Cyprich
- Belo Kubica
- Sava Poljanec
- František Hanovec
- Štefan Ocvirk
- František Brezina
- Imrich Štosel
- Michal Ilovský
- Jozef Modrovich

== Aircraft related with Slovak Resistance Air Force ==
- Focke-Wulf Fw 189A-1 (1)
- Messerschmitt Bf 109E-4 (2)
- Messerschmitt Bf 109G-6 (2)
- Avia B-534.IV (4)
- Letov Š-328 (3 examples)
- Heinkel He 72B-1 Kadett (various)
- Klemm Kl 35D (2 examples)
- Savoia-Marchetti SM.84bis (2)
- Praga E-39
