= Sliač Air Base =

Slovak military airport

- Letecká základňa Sliač
- Sliač, Slovakia
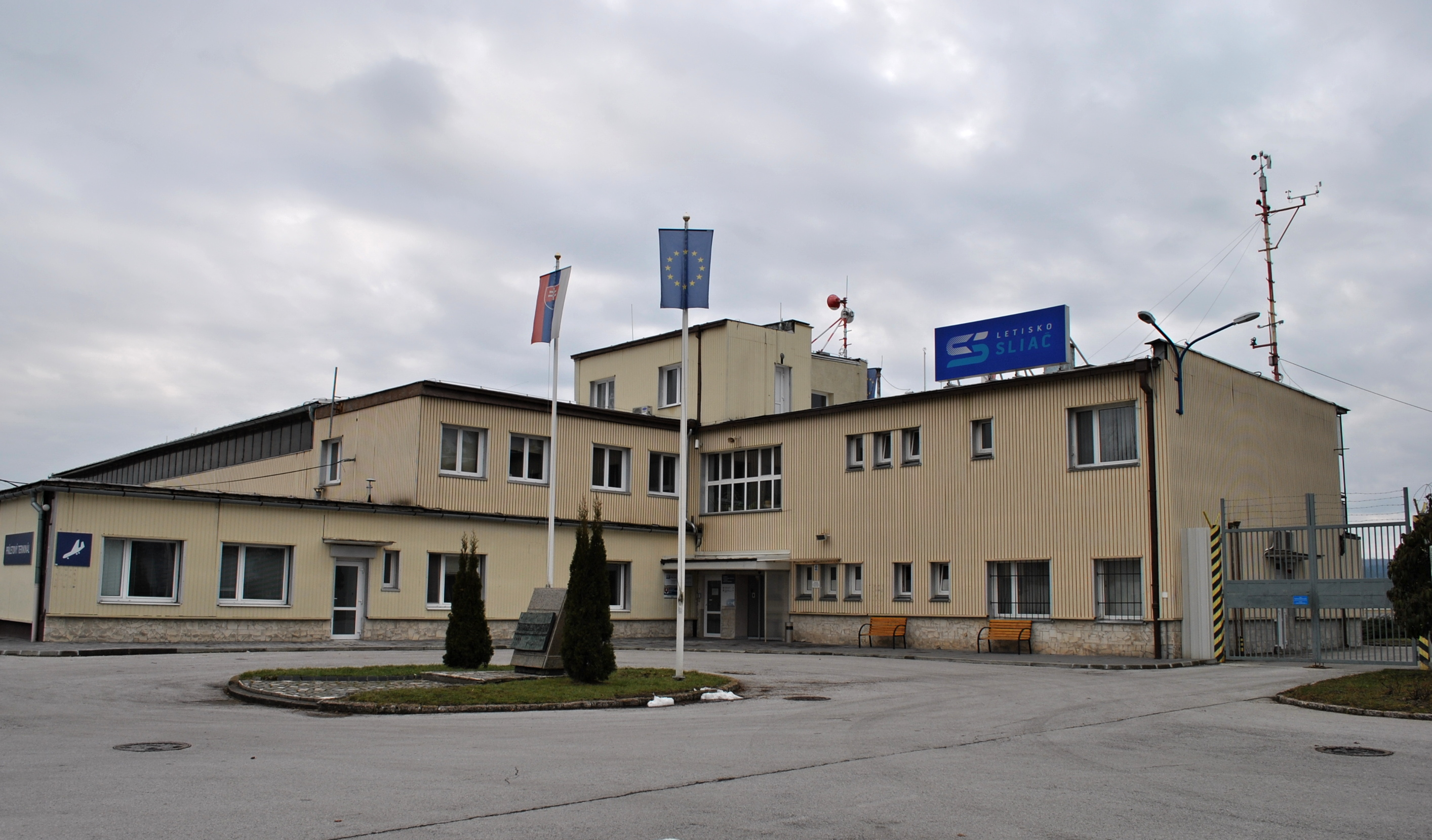
- Sliač Airport terminal

Site information
- Type: Air base
- Controlled by: Slovak Air Force
- Condition: under reconstruction

Location
- Location of Sliač Air Base in Slovakia Sliač Air Base (Europe)
- Coordinates: 48.637222°N 19.134167°E

Site history
- Built: 1957
- In use: 1957 – present

Garrison information
- Current commander: Colonel Ing, František Pytlík
- Garrison: 81. Wing Sliač

Airfield information
- Identifiers: IATA: SLD, ICAO: LZSL
- Elevation: 318 m (1,043 ft) AMSL
Runways
Direction	Length and surface
18/36	2,400 m (7,874 ft) Asphalt

Sliač Air Base (IATA: SLD, ICAO: LZSL), historically, Letisko Sliač ("Sliač Airport") or Letisko Tri Duby (literally, "The Three Oaks Airport") is a military airport in central Slovakia situated between the towns of Zvolen and Banská Bystrica and near the spa town of Sliač. The airport has one runway which is 2,400 m long (18/36). The airport is used only by the military since October 2021, when the airport has been closed to all civilian traffic.

== History ==
The "Tri Duby Airport" played an important role during the Slovak National Uprising in 1944 when it became the most important airport of the Anti-Fascist movement in Slovakia. Between September 6 and October 25, 1944, the airport was used as the main base of the Slovak Insurgent Air Force but because of the advancing German units, it had to be evacuated. While the territory controlled by the Slovak rebels was being encircled by the German forces, "Tri Duby" and the nearby Zolná airport were the main gateways to the rest of the world. In addition to the significant Soviet aid to Slovakia, the United States were sending in supplies and OSS operatives through "Tri Duby", and these flights were also used to evacuate American flyers liberated from the German POW camps.

The airport changed its name from "Tri Duby" to Sliač in 1945. Following the Prague Spring in 1968, the airfield became a base for the Soviet Union's air forces, which belonged to relations and Sliač as a fighter-bomber and surveillance base here until 1990.

During Cold War it hosted many aircraft of the Czechoslovak Air Force and Soviet Air Forces such as MiG-15 and its derivatives. MiG-19, Sukhoi Su-7, and MiG-21 mostly served in Košice but some were also hosted in Sliač. Sliač, while for Czechoslovak AF only one of many airfields on its territory, had been a crucial piece of the infrastructure of the Soviet Army. It hosted several of the most technologically advanced aircraft of the Soviet Air Force such as the MiG-23, MiG-29 and Su-22.

In 2009, it was closed for a major reconstruction project financed in part by NATO and the European Union. It was reopened for military use in May 2011, and for civilian use in June 2011. Since October 2021, the airport has been closed to all civilian traffic.

In 2022, the airport operator company Letisko Sliač a.s. went bankrupt and all airport equipment was sold. Sliač Airport operated only summer charter flights to popular sea resort destinations in Bulgaria, Turkey, Greece and Egypt.

According to ADS-B tracking data, beginning on April 26, 2022 the airport received multiple visits by three LM-100J aircraft (N67AU, N96MG, N71KM) belonging to the American company Pallas Aviation. By December 1, 2023 these flights numbered at least 80, almost all originating at Ramstein Air Base in Germany.

By 2024, air base is closed and is only used by NATO as training ground for ground operation due to reconstruction of airstrip to prepare for operation of newly built F-16C/D of Slovak Air Force.

== Statistics ==
Passenger throughput and operations 2013 - 2019:

Year	Passengers	Change	Cargo (tonnes)
2013	24,165		63.64
2014	23,663	-2.08%	296.00
2015	35,682	+50.79%	116.50
2016	22,511	-36.91%	592.20
2017	34,827	+54.71%	485.29
2018	41,866	+20.27%	73.92
2019	39,089	-6.68%	

== Gallery ==
Boeing B-52H Slovak International Air Fest 2012

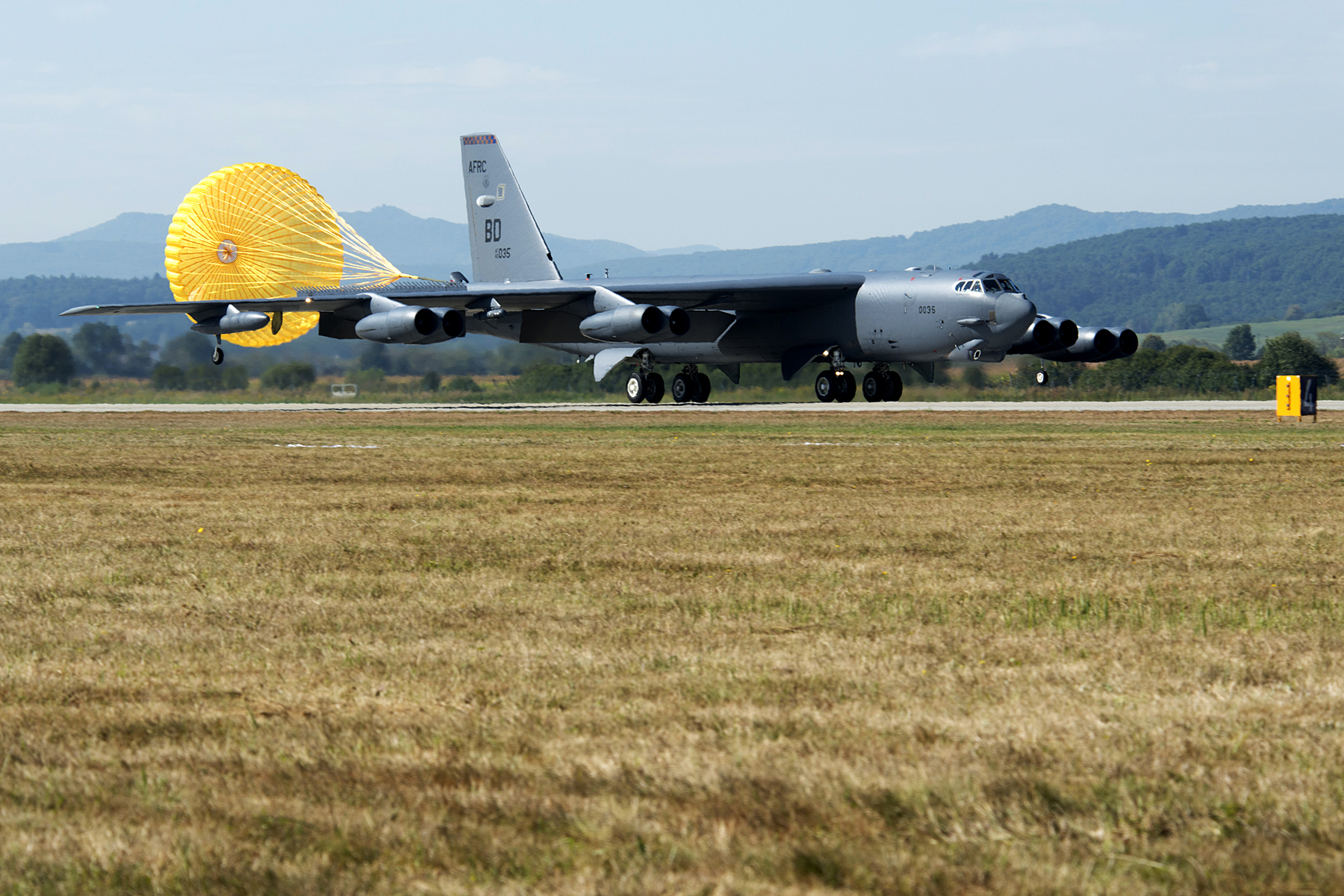
Boeing B-52H Slovak International Air Fest 2012

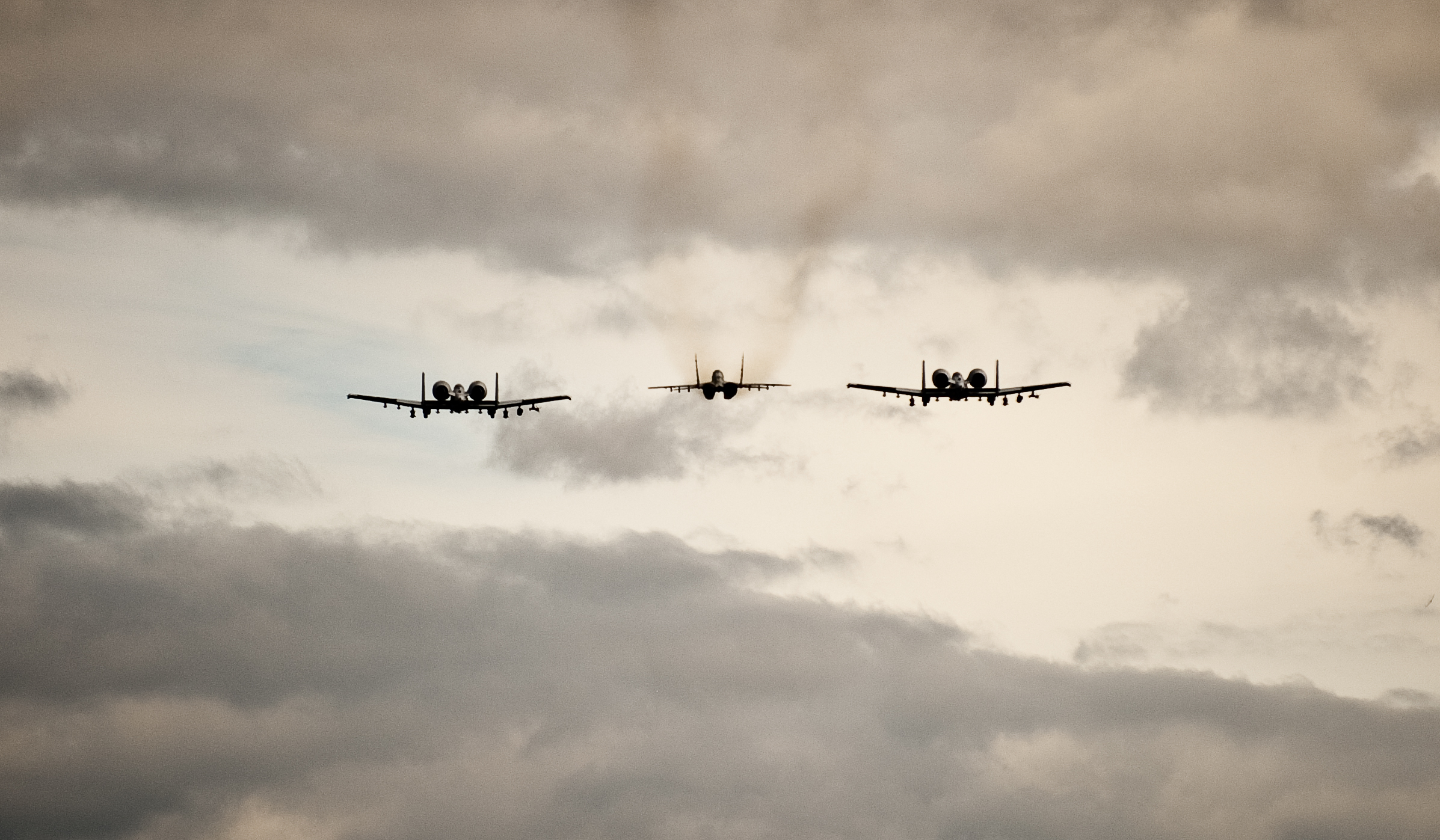
Members of the U.S. and Slovak armed forces hold a memorial service for Slovakian war hero

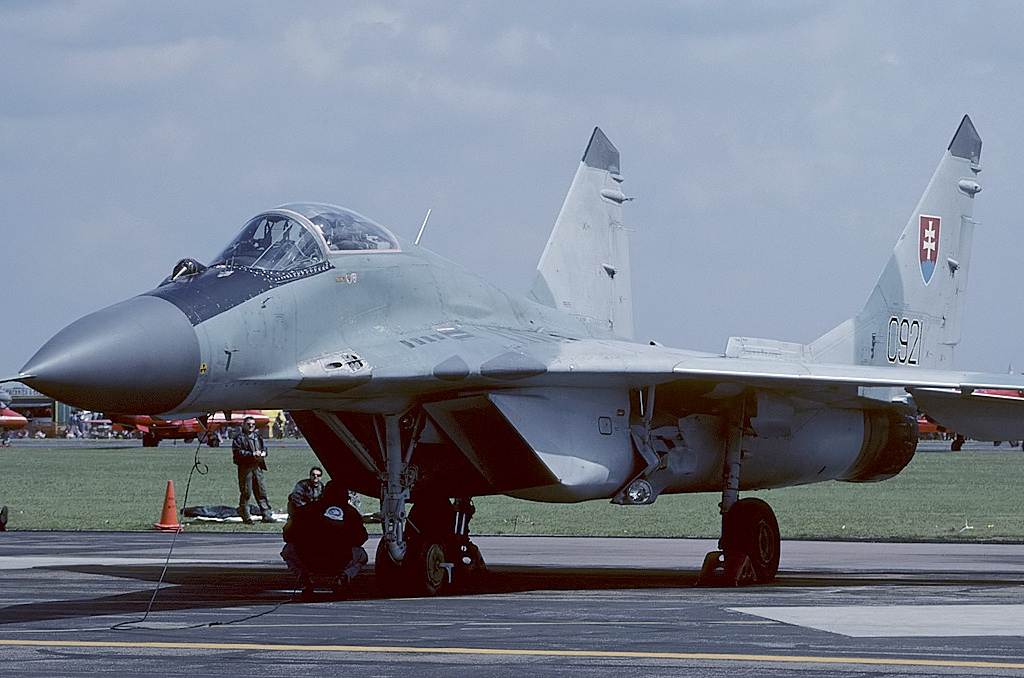
Mikoyan MiG-29A of Slovak Air Force

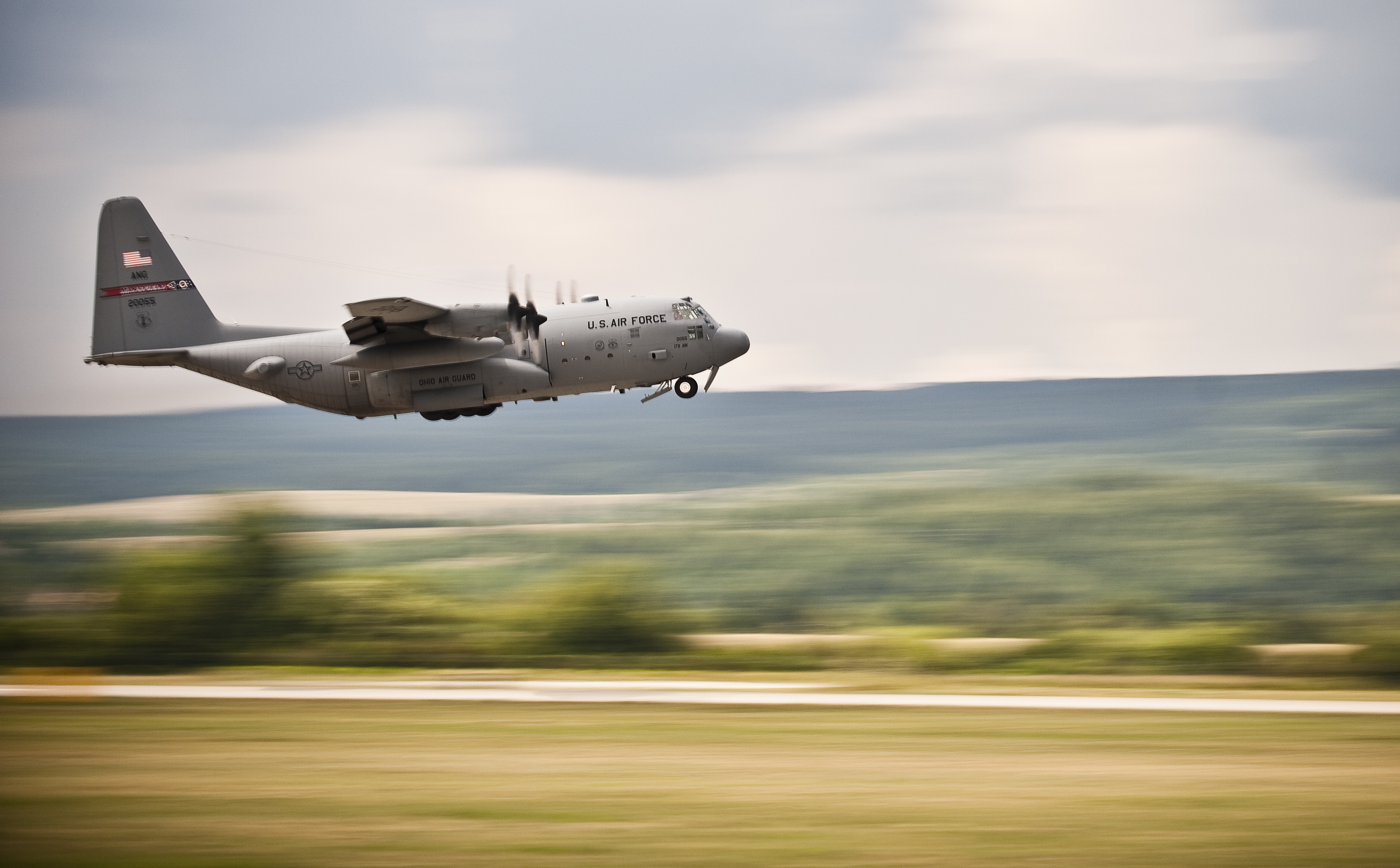
A C-130H Hercules of U.S. Air Force, takes off to perform an airdrop during exercise Slovak Warthog at Sliač Airport

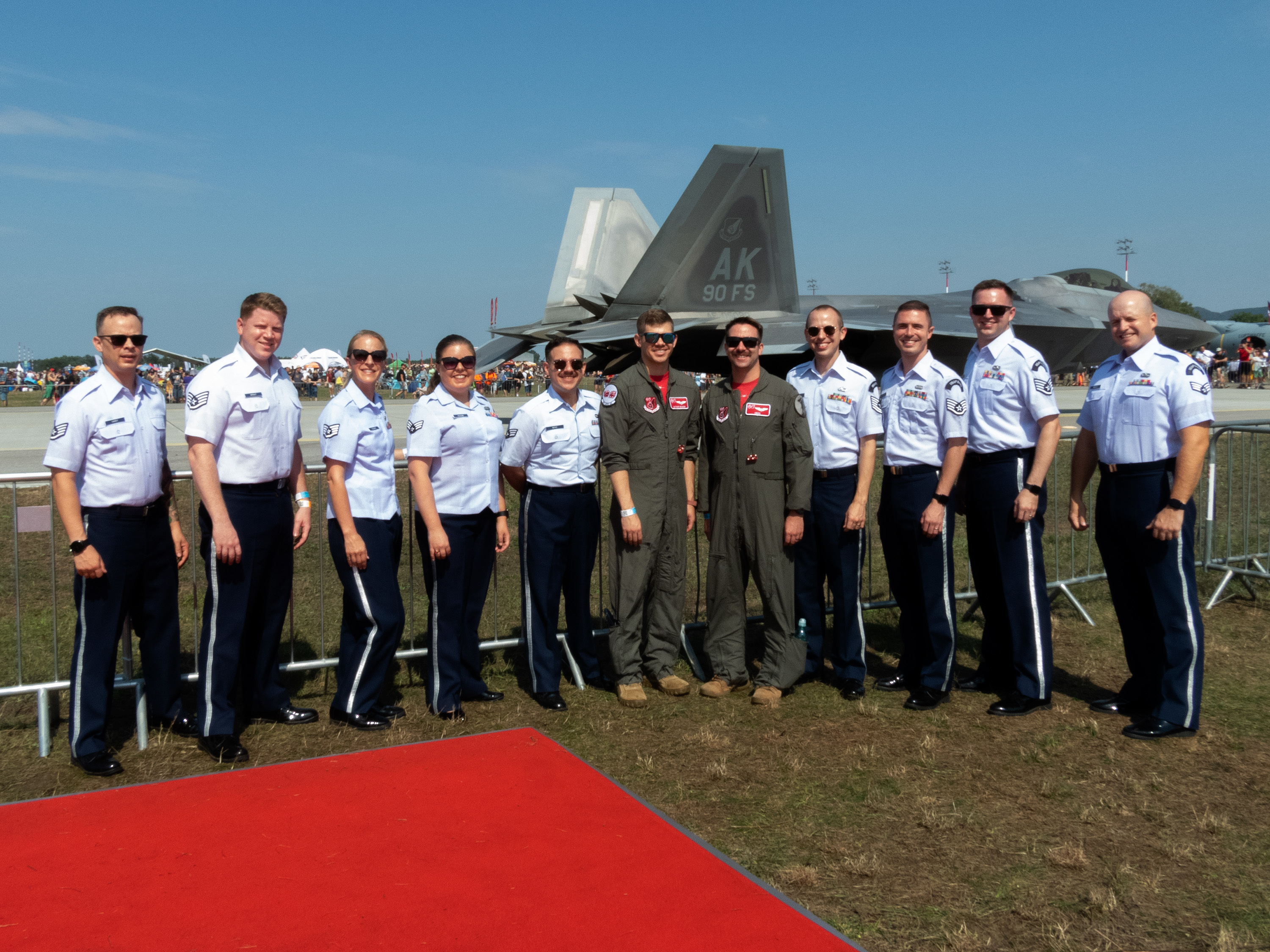
The 90th Expeditionary Fighter Squadron participates in the Slovak International Air Fest

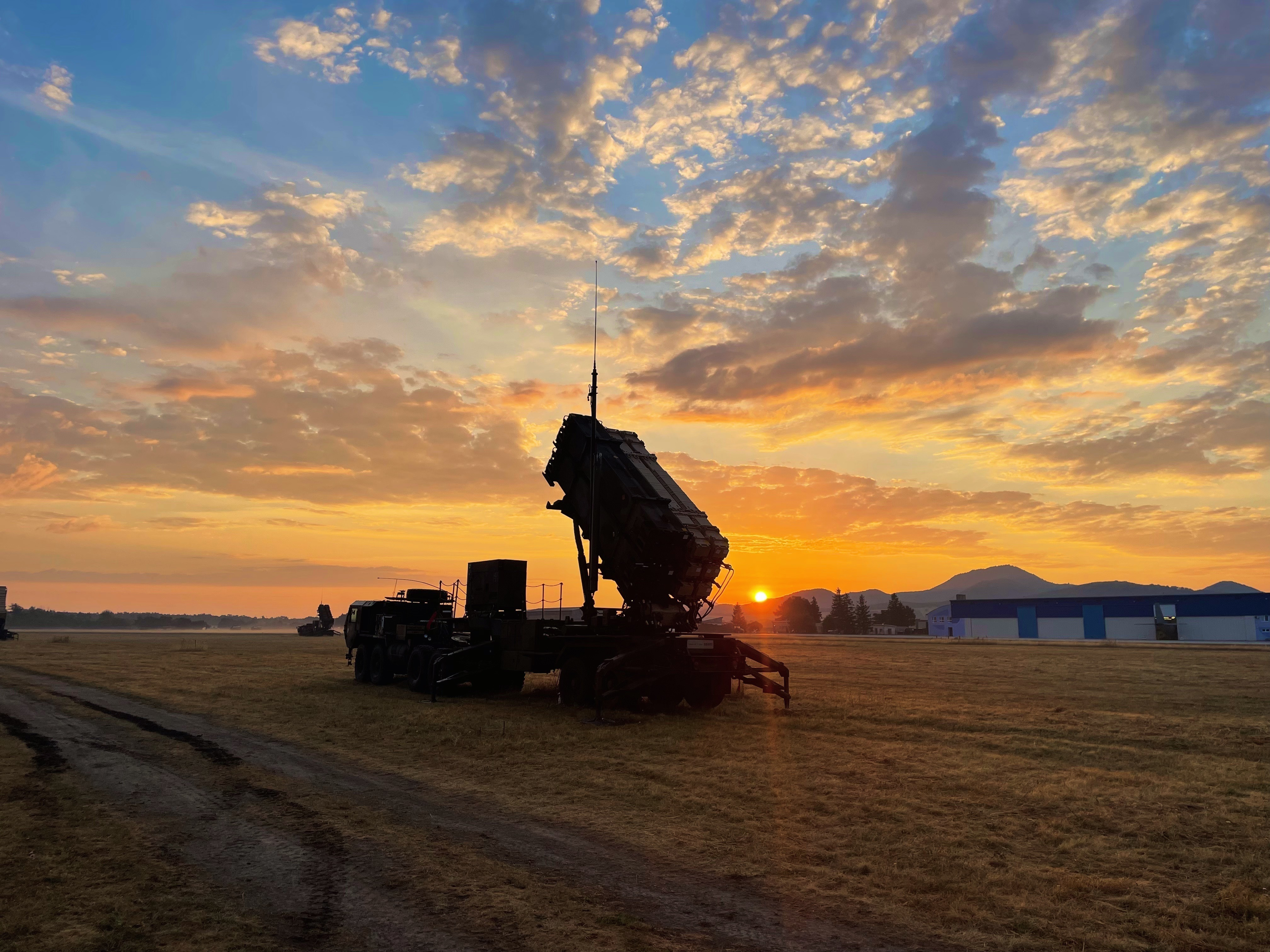
U.S. MIM-104 Patriot SAM system deployed near Sliač
