= Schelde (disambiguation) =

Schelde may refer to:

- Scheldt (Dutch name Schelde), a 350-kilometre long river in northern France, western Belgium, and the southwestern part of the Netherlands
- Schelde (Dill), a river of Hesse, Germany, tributary of the Dill
- NV Koninklijke Maatschappij De Schelde (today Damen Schelde Naval Shipbuilding), a Dutch shipyard
- De Schelde S.21, a proposed Dutch fighter of the late 1930s and early 1940s
- De Schelde Scheldemusch, a single-seat pusher biplane designed in the 1930s in the Netherlands
