= Praga E-210 =

E-210
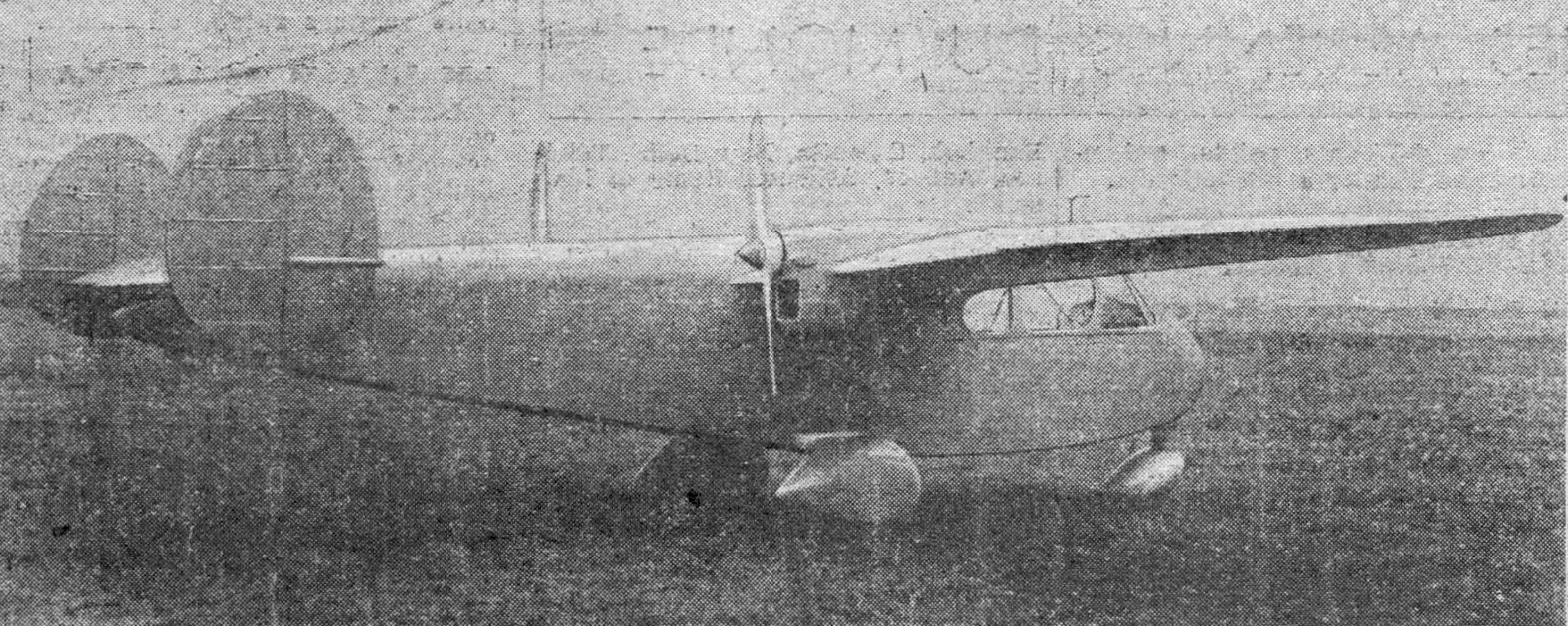

General information
- Type: 4-seat tourer
- National origin: Czechoslovakia
- Manufacturer: ČKD-Praga
- Designer: Jaroslav Šlechta
- Number built: E.210: one; E-211: two

History
- First flight: 13 February 1937

The Praga E-210 was a four-seat, twin-engined touring aircraft built in Czechoslovakia in the late 1930s. It had an unusual pusher configuration . Its tail unit and undercarriage were modified significantly before World War II and after the war a more powerful version designated E-211 was flown.

== Design and development ==
In 1935, Jaroslav Šlechta, chief designer of the aircraft department of ČKD, began development of a twin-engined, four-seat light transport aircraft, to be powered by 60 kW (80 hp) Praga D engines, suitable for use as an air taxi as well as for private use. The design of the proposed new aircraft, the Praga E-210, had progressed sufficiently by November 1935 for ČKD to submit a request to the Czechoslovak government for a contract to build a prototype. A contract for construction of one prototype was signed on 16 March 1936, with one change from the original proposal being the use of proven Walter Minor rather than Praga D engines, as it was felt that the risk of combining the untested Praga D engine with a new airframe would be too high.

The Praga E-210 was publicly unveiled at the Paris Exhibition in November 1936, with Praga having sending the externally complete, but untested and unflown prototype to the show where it was displayed on the Czechoslovak stand. It was a high wing cantilever monoplane, with an enclosed cabin for four ahead of the wing and in 1936 a conventional tailwheel fixed undercarriage and single fin. It was unusual in adopting a pusher configuration, with two engines close to the fuselage driving small propellers. Its layout was thus much like that of the Carden-Baynes Bee, its almost exact contemporary though a much smaller aircraft.

The wing of the E-210 was made in a single piece, a wooden structure built around two spars and plywood covered. The leading edge was significantly swept, but the trailing edge was straight. The ailerons were steel framed and fabric covered. Between them and the engines were Schrenk type landing flaps. The 85/95 hp (63/71 kW) Walter Minor four cylinder inverted in line engines were cantilevered from the rear spar on steel frames, with fairings both above and below the wings.

The flat sided fuselage was built on a steel tube framework, narrowing to the rear. The rounded nose and the cabin were plywood skinned and the rest fabric covered. The spatted mainwheels were mounted on short cantilever struts, making only a shallow angle to the ground and with the shock absorbers inside the fuselage. On the original aircraft there was a small castorable tailwheel, but later this was supplanted by a spatted, steerable nose wheel with a faired leg. By mid-1937 the original single fin had been replaced by a twin endplate fin arrangement. The fixed surfaces were wooden framed and plywood covered, the tailplane attached to the top of the fuselage and braced externally from below. The split elevators were fabric covered over wood, with trim tabs and the horn balanced rudders were of fabric covered steel.

The cabin was well forward of the leading edge, providing good visibility, and seated four in two rows, the front seats having dual control. There was a baggage compartment behind the rear seats, accessible from inside. Photographs show that access to the cabin was through a single, port side door.

The prototype made its first flight on 13 February 1937, but the flight was quickly terminated owing to engine overheating. These overheating problems continued during testing through the next few months, while the aircraft's rudder was found to be ineffective. By the July 1937 Prague Aero Show, the aircraft had been modified with a twin tail. Other changes made at around this time included the replacement of the original tailskid with a tailwheel. Testing of the revised prototype continued into 1938, but in the summer of that year it was decided to carry out a major redesign of the aircraft with the prototype being rebuilt to the new standard. A new wing of greater area and different aerofoil section was fitted, with flaps being removed, and the tail surfaces were revised, with larger fins and a shorter span horizontal tail. The undercarriage was also new, with a tricycle undercarriage, the first used in a Czeckoslovak design, replacing the original tailwheel landing gear. Modification of the prototype was delayed by priority being given to modifications to the Praga E-51 reconnaissance aircraft, and the modified E-210, sometimes called the E.210-I, did not arrive at Letňany Airport for testing until April 1939, after the German Occupation of Czechoslovakia, and first flew in its new form on 18 April 1939. The aircraft's handling characteristics were still not up to expectations, because the prototype was soon modified again, with a third, fixed, central fin added. The aircraft was flown in this state on 15 May 1939, with testing continuing until August that year.

It did not fly again until August 1940, when it underwent a further series of tests against German requirements and regulations. These tests continued until February 1941. Later that year, following an instruction from the German Ministry of Aviation, the prototype was re-engined with German Hirth HM 500 four-cylinder air-cooled engines rated at 77 kW (103 hp), flying with these engines for the first time on 14 June 1941. On 18 June, the aircraft was taken over by German authorities and flown to the Luftwaffe test centre at Rechlin. It is reported that following further testing, the prototype was used as a liaison aircraft, being sighted at Berlin during autumn 1944.

=== Post War development: Praga E-211 ===
Following the end of the Second World War, ČKS (Českomoravské Stroírny), the former ČKD, which had built Siebel Si 204 during the war while under German control, restarted development of its pre-war designs, with the Praga E-114 re-entering production, while an updated E.210 was proposed to the Czechoslovak Ministry of Transport. A model of a E.210 was shown at the first post war Paris Exhibition in late 1946. By 1947, the design had been developed into the E-211. This shared the same layout as the final iteration of the E.210, with a fixed tricycle undercarriage and a triple tail, but had an all-wooden monocoque fuselage instead of the steel-tube structure used by the E.210. It was powered by two Walter Minor 4-III engines rated at 78 kW (105 hp). The cabin accommodated four people, with the pilots entering from a starboard side door and the passengers from a door on the port side. Fin and tailplane were covered with fabric, in place of the plywood covering of the E.210.

The first prototype, aircraft registration OK-BFA, also known as the XE-211, made its maiden flight on 1 July 1947. After a few test flights, on 3 July, the prototype was issued with an airworthiness certificate to allow it to be shown at the Brussels Air Show, and was flown to Brussels later that day. After being shown at Brussels, together with other Czechoslovak aircraft, including the equally new Aero Ae-45 twin-engined light transport and the Mráz Sokol 3-seat light aircraft, it returned to Prague on 25 July 1947, with testing soon restarting. A second prototype was built, aircraft registration OK-CEA, which joined the testing programme in August 1948. No production followed, however, with the competing Aero Ae-45, which had superior performance, being preferred. Consideration was given to converting the two prototypes to photo survey aircraft, but surplus Aero C-3 aircraft (a post-war Czechoslovak-built version of the Siebel Si 204) proved superior in the role. Attempts to sell the prototypes failed, and on 4 March 1951, it was ordered that they be scrapped. There were plans for a light freighter version of the E-211. Also planned and under construction in late 1947 was an 8-seat development, the E-212, but it may never have flown.

== Variants ==
E.210
4-seater, powered by 2x 63 kW (85 hp) Walter Minor 4 engines, flown in the late 1930s with limited, if any, production.
E.211
A 5-seater developed version emerging in 1947, powered by 2x 78 kW (105 hp) Walter Minor 4-III engines or 2x 110 kW (150 hp) Praga E 8-cylinder horizontally opposed engenes.
E.212
A planned 8-seater enlarged version, not proceeded with.

== Specifications (E-210) - 1938 configuration ==
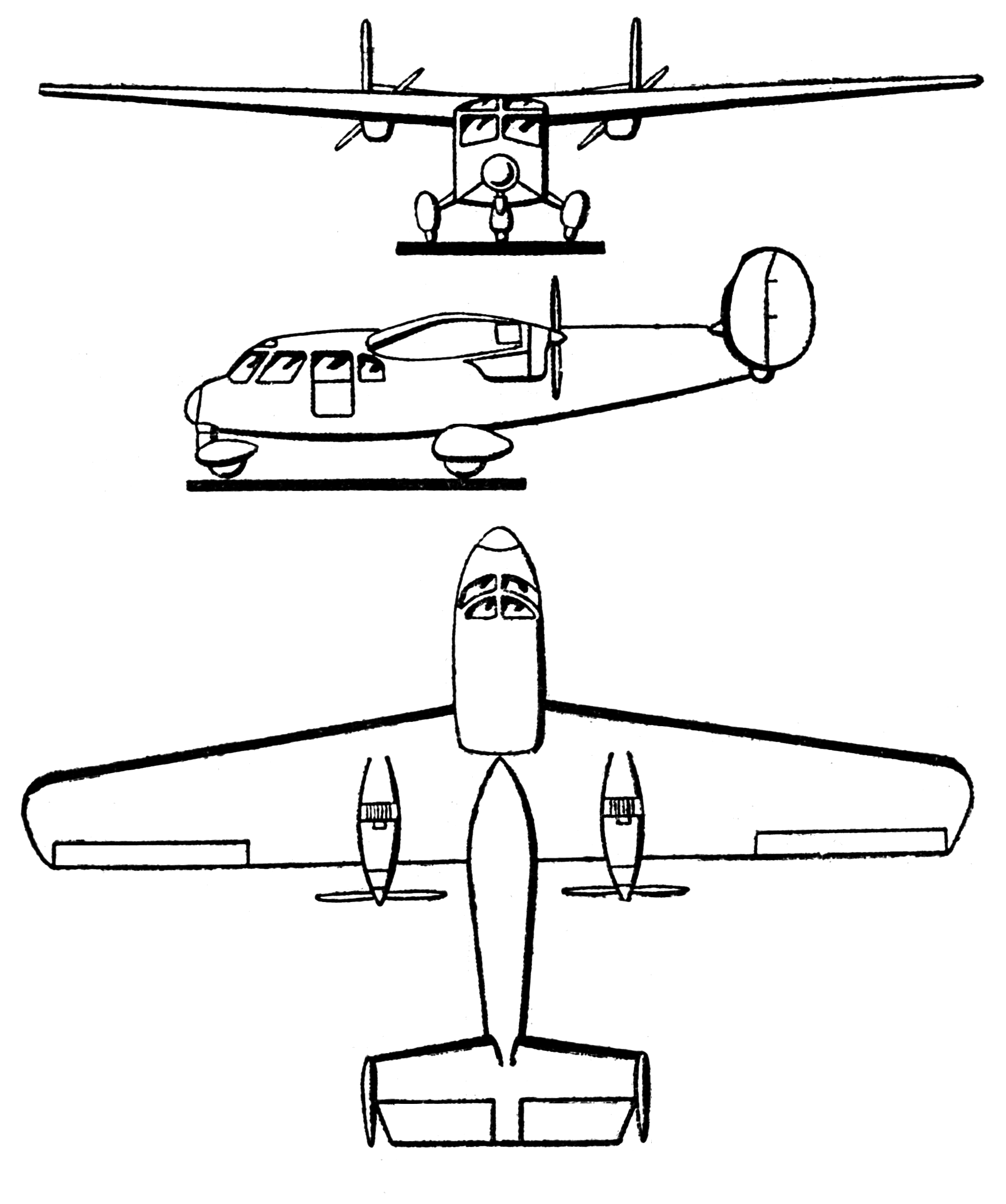
Praga E-210 3-view drawing from Les Ailes March 8, 1947

Data from Grey 1972, p. 94c

General characteristics

- Crew: 1/2
- Capacity: 2/3 (4 people in all)
- Length: 8.5 m (27 ft 11 in)
- Wingspan: 12.5 m (41 ft 0 in)
- Height: 2.07 m (6 ft 9 in)
- Wing area: 17.5 m^{2} (188 sq ft)
- Empty weight: 730 kg (1,609 lb)
- Gross weight: 1,250 kg (2,756 lb)
- Powerplant: 2 × Walter Minor 4-cylinder air cooled inverted inline, 63 kW (85 hp) each
- Propellers: 2-bladed fixed pitch wooden pusher propellers

Performance

- Maximum speed: 230 km/h (140 mph, 120 kn)
- Cruise speed: 210 km/h (130 mph, 110 kn)
- Range: 600 km (370 mi, 320 nmi)
- Service ceiling: 4,500 m (14,800 ft)
- Time to altitude: 13.6 min to 2,000 m (6,600 ft)
