= E141 =

E141 may refer to:

- The E number for chlorophyllin
- Praga E-141, a military trainer aircraft produced in Czechoslovakia during the 1930s
