= IFIL-Reghin RG-6 =

RG-6

General information
- Type: Civil trainer
- National origin: Romania
- Manufacturer: Sovromtractor at IFIL
- Designer: Vladimir Novichi
- Number built: 3

History
- First flight: 1957

The IFIL-Reghin RG-6 was a light aircraft built in Romania in 1957 for aeroclub use. It was designed by Vladimir Novichi at the request of the national sport flying association AVSAP, which specified the use of the Praga D engine, surplus stocks of which were available in Romania following production of the Zlín Z-22.

Novichi's design was for a conventional, low-wing cantilever monoplane with fixed, tailwheel undercarriage. The pilot and instructor sat in tandem under a long canopy. The structure was to be entirely of wood, so when production of the type was organised through Sovromtractor, it was assigned to the IFIL factory in Reghin, which was already producing wooden gliders. Only three examples of the RG-6 were built.

An RG-6 was used by pilot Vasile Petcu to set a national class airspeed record of 165 km/h (103 mph) over a 100 km closed circuit in 1957.

== Specifications ==
Data from Jane's All The World's Aircraft 1961–62

General characteristics

- Crew: 2
- Length: 7.40 m (24 ft 3 in)
- Wingspan: 10.50 m (34 ft 5 in)
- Height: 2.62 m (8 ft 7 in)
- Wing area: 14.5 m^{2} (156 sq ft)
- Gross weight: 660 kg (1,455 lb)
- Fuel capacity: 79 L (21 US gal; 17 imp gal)
- Powerplant: 1 × Praga D air-cooled flat-four, 56 kW (75 hp)

Performance

- Maximum speed: 180 km/h (110 mph, 97 kn) at sea level
- Cruise speed: 143 km/h (89 mph, 77 kn) at 2,500 m (8,200 ft)
- Endurance: 5 hr
- Service ceiling: 3,200 m (10,500 ft)
