= Hurel-Dubois HD.10 =

HD.10
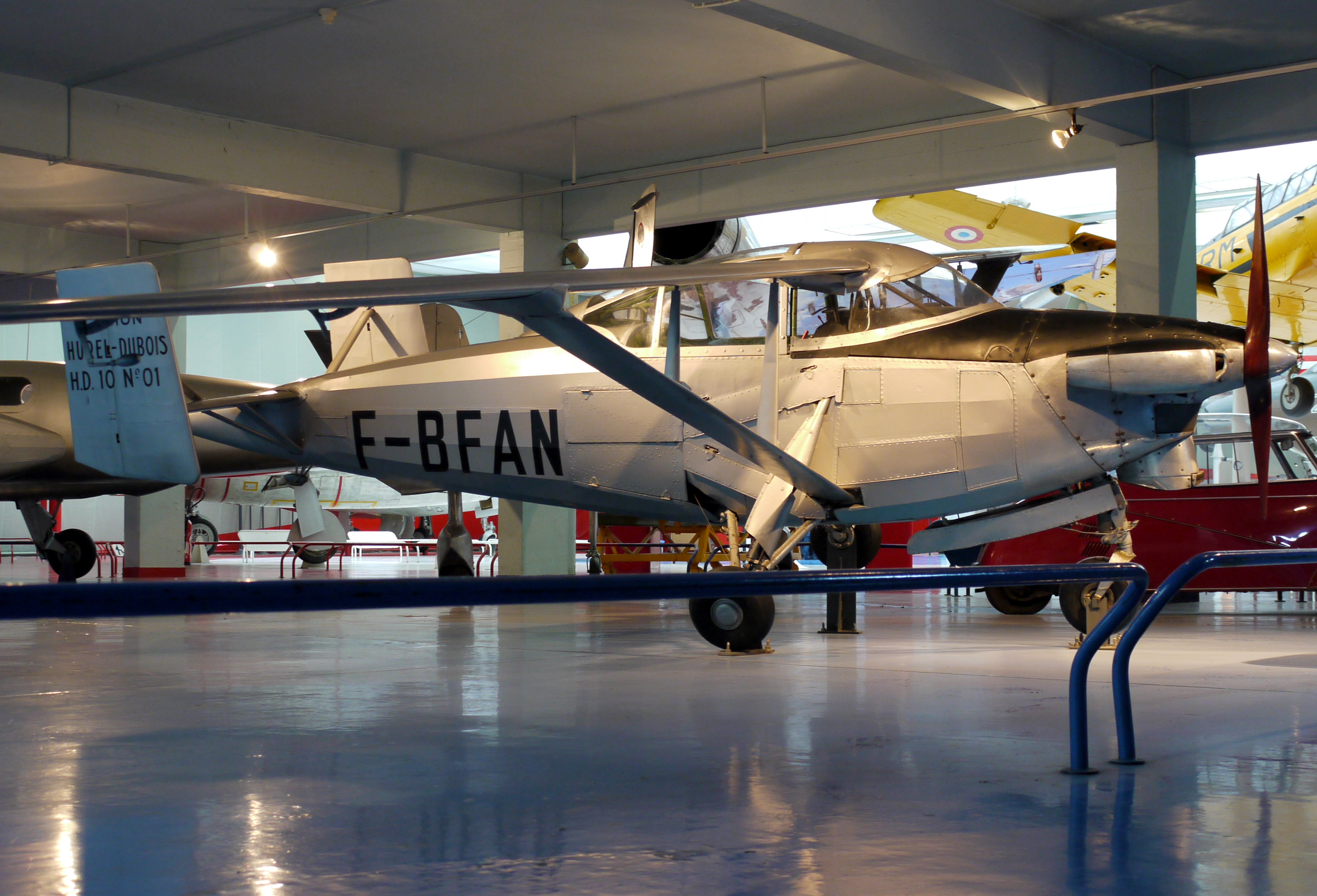

General information
- Type: Research aircraft
- National origin: France
- Manufacturer: Hurel-Dubois
- Number built: 1

History
- First flight: 25 August 1948
- Retired: 28 September 1954

The Hurel-Dubois HD.10 was a French research aircraft first flown in 1948 to investigate Maurice Hurel's ideas about high aspect ratio wings. It was a single-seat monoplane with a retractable tricycle undercarriage and twin tails, featuring a very high aspect-ratio wing of 32.5:1. This was mounted above the aircraft's enclosed cockpit and braced with struts. Construction was of metal throughout. Between 1948 and 1954, this aircraft accumulated some 218 hours and 27 minutes of flight time and is now preserved in the Musée de l'Air et de l'Espace in Paris.

== Design and development ==
The French aircraft designer Maurice Hurel set up the Société des Avions Hurel-Dubois, with the industrialist Léon-Joseph Dubois, in November 1947, to develop Hurel's theories about the use of high aspect ratio wings. To demonstrate the practicality of these ideas, Hurel designed a single-engined prototype, the HD.10, with construction entrusted to the Établissements Pierre Levasseur.

The HD.10 was a high-winged tractor configuration monoplane with the metal wing braced by single lift struts to the fuselage. Fowler flaps were fitted to the wing. The fuselage was of fabric-covered steel tube construction with the pilot sitting in an enclosed cockpit under the trailing edge of the wing. A twin tail was fitted, and the aircraft had a manually actuated retractable tricycle landing gear. The aircraft was initially powered by a 40 hp (30 kW) Mathis engine.

The aircraft made its first flight, with Hurel at the controls, on 25 August 1948. The aircraft was underpowered with the Mathis, and it was re-engined with a 75 hp (56 kW) Praga D. Testing at the Centre d'Essais en Vol resulted in the aircraft's vertical tail surfaces being enlarged. It made its final flight on 20 June 1954, having completed more than 218 flight hours. It was then delivered to the Musée de l'Air at Paris–Le Bourget Airport for preservation and display.

== Specifications ==
Data from aviafrance

General characteristics

- Crew: 1
- Length: 5.15 m (16 ft 11 in)
- Wingspan: 12.00 m (39 ft 4 in)
- Height: 1.55 m (5 ft 1 in)
- Wing area: 4.50 m^{2} (48.4 sq ft)
- Aspect ratio: 32.5:1
- Gross weight: 480 kg (1,058 lb)
- Powerplant: 1 × Praga D air-cooled flat four, 56 kW (75 hp)

Performance

- Maximum speed: 250 km/h (160 mph, 130 kn)
- Range: 1,000 km (620 mi, 540 nmi)
- Service ceiling: 5,000 m (16,000 ft)
