= De Schelde S.21 =

S.21

General information
- Type: Fighter aircraft
- National origin: Netherlands
- Manufacturer: NV Koninklijke Maatschappij De Schelde
- Status: Project abandoned
- Number built: 1 incomplete prototype

The De Schelde S.21 was a proposed Dutch fighter of the late 1930s and early 1940s. It was a single-seat, single-engined, pusher monoplane. A single prototype was under construction in 1940, but work was abandoned due to the German invasion.

== Design and development ==
The Dutch shipbuilding company NV Koninklijke Maatschappij De Schelde of Vlissingen entered the aviation business in 1935, when it recruited most of the technical staff, including Chief Designer T. E. Slot, of Pander & Son, which had failed in 1934. Early designs built by De Schelde were the De Schelde Scheldemusch, a lightweight single-seater pusher biplane powered by a 40 horsepower (30 kW) Praga B engine, and the Scheldemeeuw, a flying boat version of the Scheldemusch. In 1938, Slot started design work on two more advanced types which also followed Slot's preferred pusher configuration, the De Schelde S.20, a light cabin monoplane, and the S.21, a single-seat fighter, with construction of prototypes for both types beginning in early 1939.

The S.21 was a low-wing cantilever monoplane of all-metal construction. It featured an inverted gull wing, with the aircraft's tail carried on twin booms. The compact fuselage nacelle carried the pilot, engine and the aircraft's armament. The pilot sat in a heavily glazed cockpit in the nose of the nacelle, with the engine, a Daimler-Benz DB 600Ga liquid-cooled inverted V12 engine rated at 1,050 hp (780 kW) for takeoff and at 920 hp (690 kW) at 4,000 m (13,000 ft), driving a three-bladed propeller was situated immediately behind the pilot. Slot recognized that to allow the pilot to bail out from the aircraft, the propeller would have to be jettisoned. A mechanism for doing this had yet to be decided on when work on the aircraft stopped. The engine was cooled by a radiator in the nose of the aircraft below the cockpit. A nosewheel undercarriage was fitted.

Its armament consisted of a single Madsen 23 mm cannon on a flexible mount in the nose, together with four 7.9 mm FN-Browning machine guns in the side of the nacelle. The cannon was intended to be fixed during air-to-air combat, and during ground strafing operations, it would be released and aimed manually by the pilot, with an automatic stabilizing system controlling the aircraft's ailerons and elevators to aid the pilot in keeping control of the aircraft while busy aiming and firing the cannon.

The prototype S.21 was almost complete when Germany invaded the Netherlands in May 1940, with the De Schelde factory and the prototype S.21 being seized by German troops. Development was abandoned, with the prototype being tested to destruction at Utrecht. Although abandoned, artist impressions of the S.21 were presented in the wartime aviation press as the fictional Focke-Wulf Fw 198.

== Specifications (Performance estimated) ==
3-way drawing of the De Schelde S.21

Data from Dutch Digression

General characteristics

- Crew: 1
- Length: 7.43 m (24 ft 5 in)
- Wingspan: 9.00 m (29 ft 6 in)
- Height: 2.60 m (8 ft 6 in)
- Empty weight: 1,700 kg (3,748 lb)
- Gross weight: 2,500 kg (5,512 lb)
- Powerplant: 1 × Daimler-Benz DB 600Ga liquid-cooled inverted V12 engine, 780 kW (1,050 hp)

Performance

- Maximum speed: 590 km/h (370 mph, 320 kn) at 4,000 metres (13,000 ft)
- Cruise speed: 520 km/h (320 mph, 280 kn)
- Service ceiling: 10,000 m (33,000 ft)

Armament

- Guns:
  1 × 23 mm Madsen cannon
  4 × 7.9 mm machine guns
