= Praga E.114 =

Czechoslovak single-engine sports plane

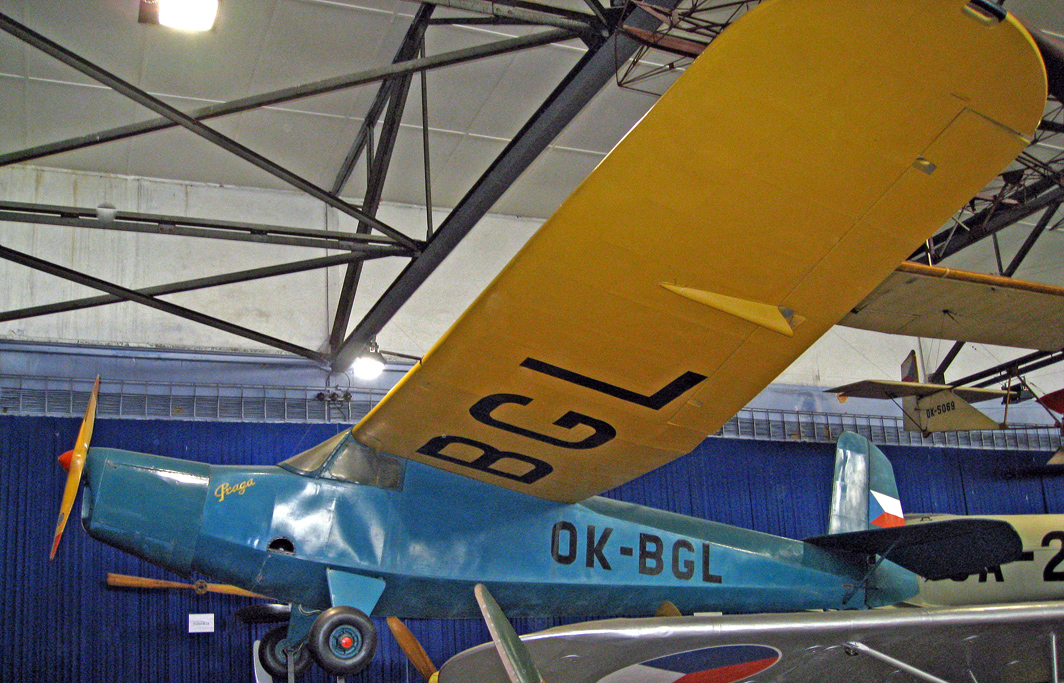
- Praga E.114M Air Baby OK-BGL on display at the Prague Aviation Museum, Kbely in May 2008

General information
- Type: light private owner aircraft
- Manufacturer: ČKD-Praga
- Designer: Jaroslav Šlechta
- Primary user: private owners
- Number built: Approximately 275

History
- First flight: September 1934

The Praga E.114 was a single-engine sport airplane, designed and manufactured by the Czechoslovak company ČKD-Praga. Due to its light weight it was also called Air Baby.

== Design and development ==
The Praga E.114, first flown in 1934 and designed by Jaroslav Šlechta, was a high wing, cantilever monoplane seating two in a side-by-side cabin. It was an all wood aircraft with a two spar single piece wing; the spars and ribs were built from pine and plywood and the wing plywood covered. The wing section was reflexed at the trailing edge. The wing had a constant chord centre section with taper on the trailing edge outboard and rounded tips. The ailerons were plywood covered and unbalanced.

Its fuselage was a pine framed, plywood covered hexagonal box, with the straight edged fin an integral part. The rudder was rounded and horn balanced. Though the rudder was wood framed and covered, the tailplane, mounted just above the fuselage and externally braced from below, had a tube steel structure and was fabric covered. The elevators were balanced by an elastic rope to the control column.

Early in the design process the E.114 had been envisaged as an open cockpit aircraft but by the time of construction there was an enclosed cabin. The first prototype had rather crude glazing constructed from plane panes. The absence of doors made entry somewhat challenging, with the side panels hinged down and the upper pane, together with part of the wing leading edge hinged upwards. The second prototype added a lower fuselage foothold to ease the process, as well as fitting less angular glazing. The undercarriage, which was also used as a first step into the cabin, was of the divided type with faired legs hinged on the lower fuselage, assisted by struts from the centre line to the wheels. The wheels contained rubber shock absorbers and were optionally spatted

Early aircraft were powered by a 29 kW (36 hp) Aeronca E-113 air-cooled, boxer two-cylinder engine mounted in the extreme nose with its cylinders exposed. Early production aircraft replaced the US-built Aeronca with a very similar Czechoslovak engine, also built by Praga, called the Praga B. Later the similar but more powerful Praga B2 was fitted and from 1936 this was replaced in turn by the four-cylinder Praga D producing 49/55 kW (65/74 hp), with each pair of exposed cylinders merged into a single housing for lower drag. Aircraft with this engine were referred to as E.114D.

As well as benefiting from more power, the E.114D had other enhancements. The ailerons were balanced, improving the stall characteristics; the vertical surfaces were increased in area and given a more angular profile with a non-balanced rudder.

The last E.114 variant involving an engine change was the E.114M, fitted with a 49 kW (65 hp) Walter Mikron III four-cylinder inverted inline engine. The full cowling changed the look of the nose considerably and increased the length by 510 mm (20 in). The E.114M was the heaviest of the series, with an empty weight of 415 kg (915 lb); the E.114D weighed 330 kg (728 lb). The wing carried noticeable dihedral and the E.114M was the only one of its type to have a tailwheel rather than a skid. It was the fastest of the type, with a maximum speed of 185 km/h (115 mph).

The E.115 appeared in 1937 with significant changes to the wing. The span was only slightly reduced (by 200 mm or 7.9 in) but continuous taper reduced the area by 20%. The ailerons were fabric covered. It could be powered by either the Praga B or D and was noticeably faster than earlier variants, even with the smaller engine. The E.115 also had a revised undercarriage, with single, streamlined steel struts hinged to the lower fuselage braced by rods to the centre section. The wheels were spatted and the legs sprung with bungee cord inside the fuselage.

The E.117 of 1937 had major alterations. The wing was the same span as that of the E.114 but was given a straight taper, resulting in a small (3.3%) decrease in area. For the first time flaps (of the split type) were fitted. The wing remained wooden but a steel framed, fabric covered fuselage was used and the fin and elevator were similarly constructed. The new fuselage construction allowed the E.117 to have cabin doors for the first time, as well as a more generous interior. It had cantilever undercarriage legs, with wheels in fairings and a tailwheel in place of the skid used by most of the E.114s and E.115, though one of the only two E.117s built flew for a time with a tricycle undercarriage, its mainlegs moved rearwards and with a faired nosewheel assembly.

The E.214, which appeared in about 1936 or 1937 was essentially an E.114 with a 56 kW (75 hp) Pobjoy R seven-cylinder radial engine. The structure was the same as that of the E.114 and the wings had the same dimensions. With a length of 7.15 m (23 ft 5½ in), the E.214 was a few millimetres longer than the E.114M, despite the latter's much longer engine and the extension provided space for a second pair of seats behind the first, making the E.214 a four-seater. The new seats were accessed via a side door, though the front pair retained the side window route of the earlier aircraft. A trim tab on the elevator replaced the elastic rope balance and the undercarriage was also new, each side having an oleo leg fixed to the lower fuselage longeron and braced at its lower end by a V-form strut, hinged on the fuselage centreline. At 420 kg (926 lb), its empty weight was close to that of the E.114M. Maximum speed was 170 km/h (106 mph).

== Operational history ==
The first Air Baby prototype flew for the first time in September 1934 and appeared at the Czech National Flying Club Competition. After several demonstration flights within Europe it was displayed at the 1934 Paris salon.

The Praga was produced before World War II both by ČKD-Praga in Prague and, under licence as the Hillson Praga, by F. Hills & Sons Ltd of Manchester in the United Kingdom. Approximately 150 E.114B models were built, including roughly 40 of the Hillson variant. Collective production of E.114 D, E and M versions was around 125.

In 1938 the E.115, then powered by a Praga B engine, set a class speed record at 171.5 km/h (106.6 mph) over a 100 km (62 mi) course. In May 1936 one was flown from the UK to South Africa in a new record time of 16 days and 4.5 hours. No South African sales followed and this aircraft was later converted into a glider.

Two E.114s participated in the Sternflug to the 1936 Summer Olympics in Berlin. The two E.114 pilots, Fuksa and Polma, took the first two places ahead of competitors, equipped with aircraft with more powerful engines.

Before the war some Czech built E.114s were exported to other European countries including Italy and Romania.

The first Manchester-built Hillson Praga was exported to Australia. Demand for the type in the UK was subdued and over half went to flying clubs, including a batch of ten to the Northern Aviation School & Club (NAS&C), set up at Barton Aerodrome near Manchester by the manufacturers for this purpose. The NAS&C also trained prospective pilots of the Civil Air Guard. The Praga B engines manufactured in the UK by Jowett Cars Ltd proved unreliable and at least five were replaced by the much heavier 30 kW (40 hp) Aeronca JAP J-99 flat twin. A Hillson Praga won the Manx Air Derby, flying three circuits of the Isle of Man on 1 June 1936 at 144 km/h (89.5 mph).

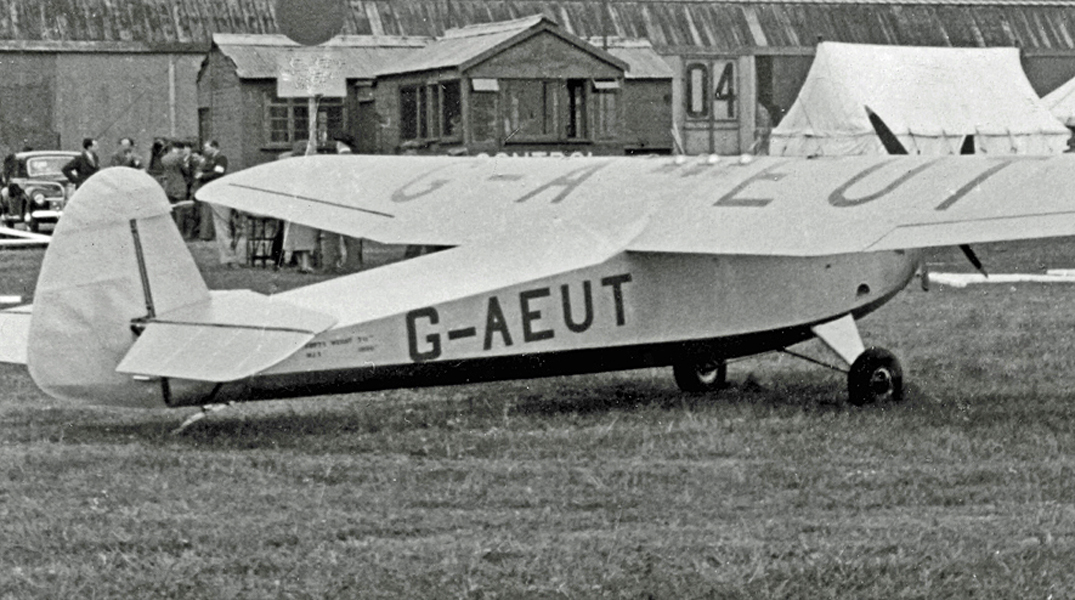
British-built Hillson Praga active in 1952

Post-war Czech built E.114Ms were exported to France, Finland, Italy, Switzerland, Romania and the Saarland. Used as tourers and trainers, they also acted as glider tugs. Five Hillsons survived the war but only two flew again. One crashed in Turkey in 1946 and the other, G-AEUT (photo) crashed in Italy in 1957.

As of 2017, there are two active flying Praga Air Baby in existence:

- HB-UAF, the aircraft is powered by a Walter Mikron III engine.
- OK-TAU58, reconstructed in 2016, former Swiss registered HB-UAD E.114M (part of the reconstruction included refitting the aircraft with an original Praga B2 engine).

== Aircraft on display ==
E.114M OK-BGL is on display in the Prague Aviation Museum in Prague.

== Variants ==
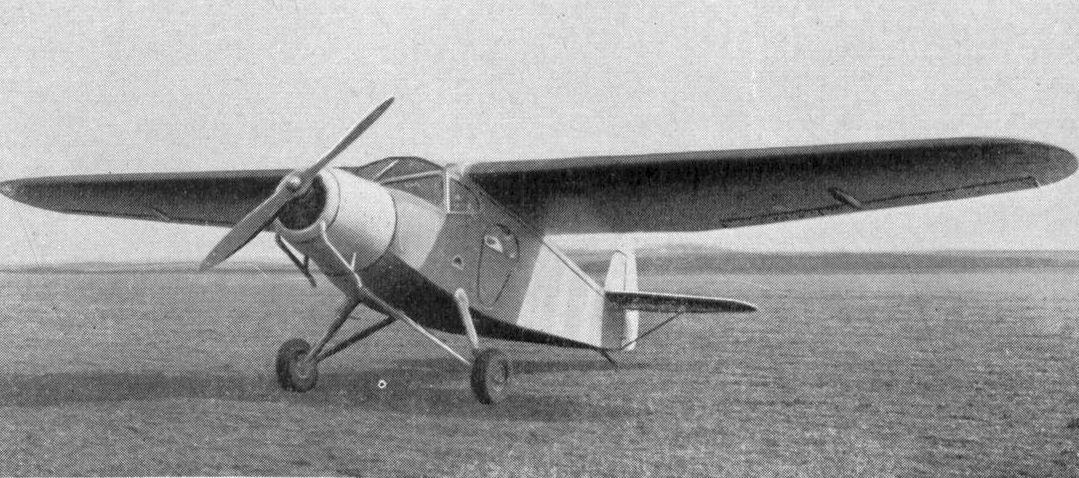
Praga E.214 photo from Le Pontentiel Aérien Mondial 1936

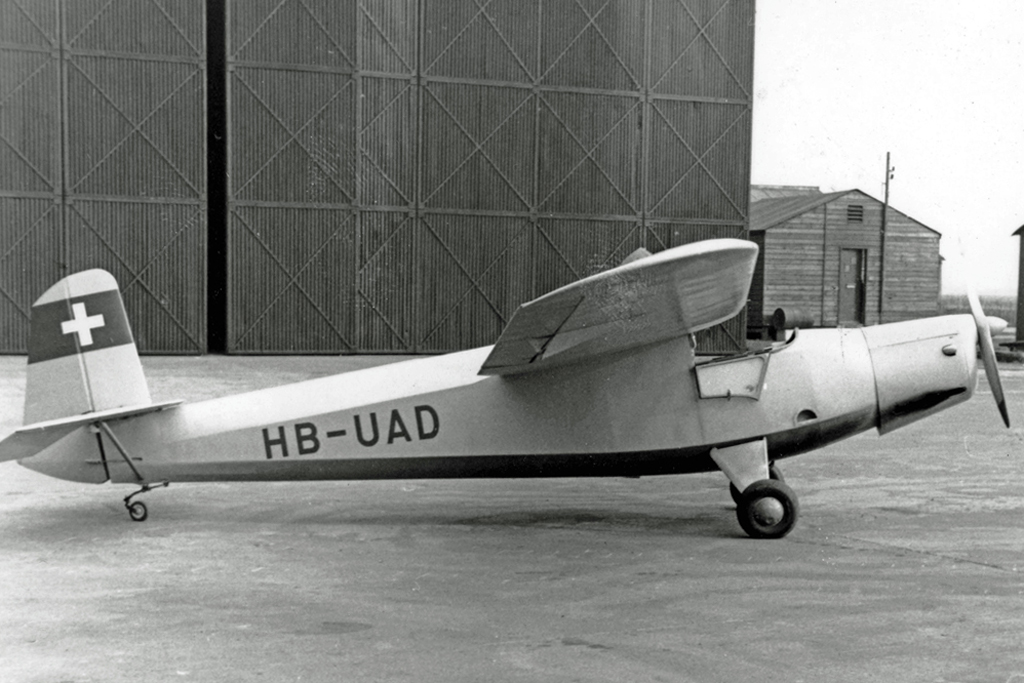
Post-war built Praga E.114 Air Baby HB-UAD visiting Manchester Airport from Switzerland in March 1953

All variants apart from the E.115 had the same dimensions. Data from Air Britain Archive No.3 (2011), p. 129

E.114 (Praga B)
30 kW (40 hp) Praga B flat four engine.

E.114 (Praga B-2)
36 kW (45 hp) Praga B2 flat four engine. As specifications.

E.114 (Praga D) or E.114D
49-59 kW (65-79 hp) Praga D flat four engine. Maximum speed 150 km/h (93 mph).

E.114M
Marked dihedral on wing. 48 kW (65 hp) Walter Mikron III four-cylinder inline engine. Maximum speed 185 km/h.

E.114C
At least one E.114M was modified to accept a 49 kW (65 hp) Continental A65 flat four sometime after 1952 and this was registered as an E.114C.

E.115
Span decreased to 10.8 m (35 ft 5 in), wing area to 12.15 m² (130.78 ft^{2}); length increased to 6.8 m (22 ft 4 in). 36 kW (45 hp) Praga B2 flat four engine. Maximum speed of 173 km/h (108 mph). Only one built.

E.117
Changes to wing and fuselage. Flaps added. Wing area 14.75 m² (158.77 ft^{2}). 49-59 kW (65-79 hp) Praga D flat four engine. The fastest Praga-engined Air Baby, with a maximum speed of 216 km/h (134 mph). Only two built. One flew for a while with a tricycle undercarriage.

E.214
E.114 variant with a 56 kW (75 hp) Pobjoy R seven-cylinder radial engine, lengthened fuselage and seating for four.

== Operators ==
Czechoslovakia

- Czechoslovak Air Force

Iran

- Imperial Iranian Air Force – one aircraft only

== Specifications (E.114 - Praga B-2) ==
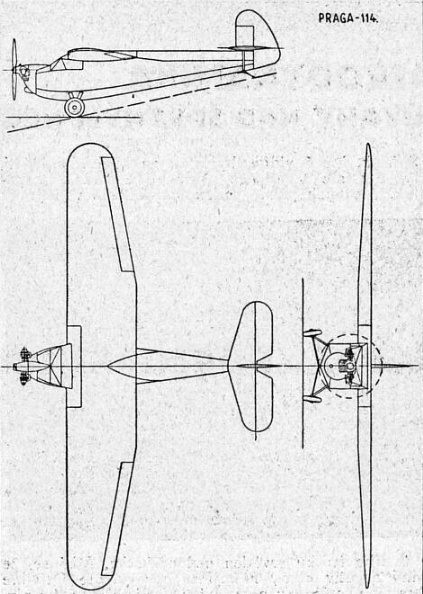
Three-view drawing, from the Letectví magazine, October 1934

Data from Air Britain Archive No.3 (2011), p.129, Jane's All the World's Aircraft 1938 and 1947.

General characteristics

- Capacity: 2
- Length: 6.6 m (21 ft 8 in)
- Wingspan: 11 m (36 ft 1 in)
- Height: 2.4 m (7 ft 10 in)
- Wing area: 15.25 m^{2} (164.1 sq ft)
- Empty weight: 325 kg (717 lb)
- Gross weight: 555 kg (1,224 lb)
- Powerplant: 1 × Praga B-2 4-cylinder, air-cooled horizontally opposed, 34 kW (45 hp)
- Propellers: 2-bladed fixed pitch wooden propeller

Performance

- Maximum speed: 150 km/h (93 mph, 81 kn)
- Cruise speed: 135 km/h (84 mph, 73 kn)
- Range: 450 km (280 mi, 240 nmi)
- Endurance: 3.75 h
- Service ceiling: 3,000 m (9,800 ft)
- Time to altitude: 10 min 47 seconds to 1,000 m (3,300 ft)
- Power/mass: 9.75 kg/kW (7.27 lb/hp)
- Take-off run:140 m (460 ft)
- Landing run:123 m (404 ft)
- Landing speed: 60 km/h (37 mph; 32 kn)
