= Praga BH-41 =

1930s Czechoslovak military trainer aircraft

BH-41
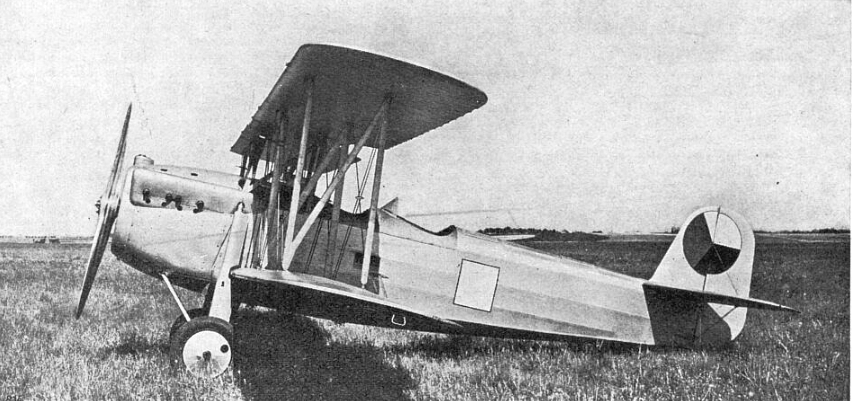
- Praga BH-41

General information
- Type: Military advanced trainer
- National origin: Czechoslovakia
- Manufacturer: ČKD-Praga
- Primary user: Czechoslovak Air Force; Slovak Air Force

History
- First flight: 1931

The Praga BH-41, later redesignated E-41, was a military advanced trainer aircraft produced in Czechoslovakia during the 1930s.

== Design and development ==
Designed in response to a Defence Ministry competition and based on the BH-39, it was a conventional biplane design with unstaggered two-bay wings of equal span. The pilot and instructor sat in open cockpits in tandem, and the fixed tailskid undercarriage featured divided main units. The powerplant had been specified by the government to be the Hispano-Suiza 8Fb which were then being manufactured under licence by Škoda.

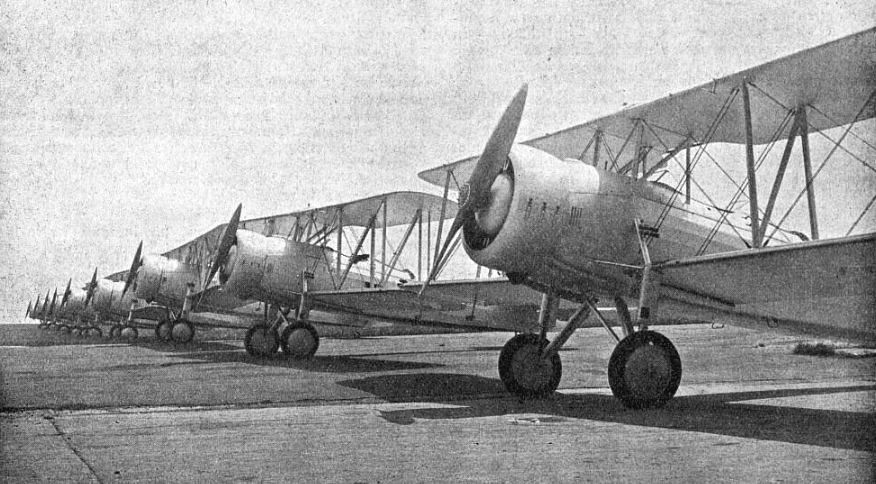
Group of Czechoslovak E-241s on a flight line

The E-41 was selected as the winner of the competition, and a contract for 43 aircraft was signed. Praga also produced a version powered by a ZOD 260 radial diesel engine, designated the E-141. This was not a success and only a single prototype was built. In 1936, a BH-41 was fitted with a Walter Pollux II engine, and designated the E-241. Following successful trials, an order was placed for a second batch of aircraft, this time for 95 machines with this engine.

These aircraft continued service in the Slovak–Hungarian War and into the Second World War, when around 30 E-241s saw service with the Slovak Air Force in its campaign against the Soviet Union together with the German Luftwaffe.

== Variants ==
- BH-41 or E-41 - original version with Hispano-Suiza 8Fb engine (43 built)
- E-141 - version with ZOD 260 engine
- E-241 - version with Walter Pollux II engine (95 built)

== Operators ==
Czechoslovakia

- Czechoslovak Air Force

Germany

- Luftwaffe

(Slovakia) Slovak Republic

- Slovak Air Force (1939–1945)

== Specifications (E-241) ==
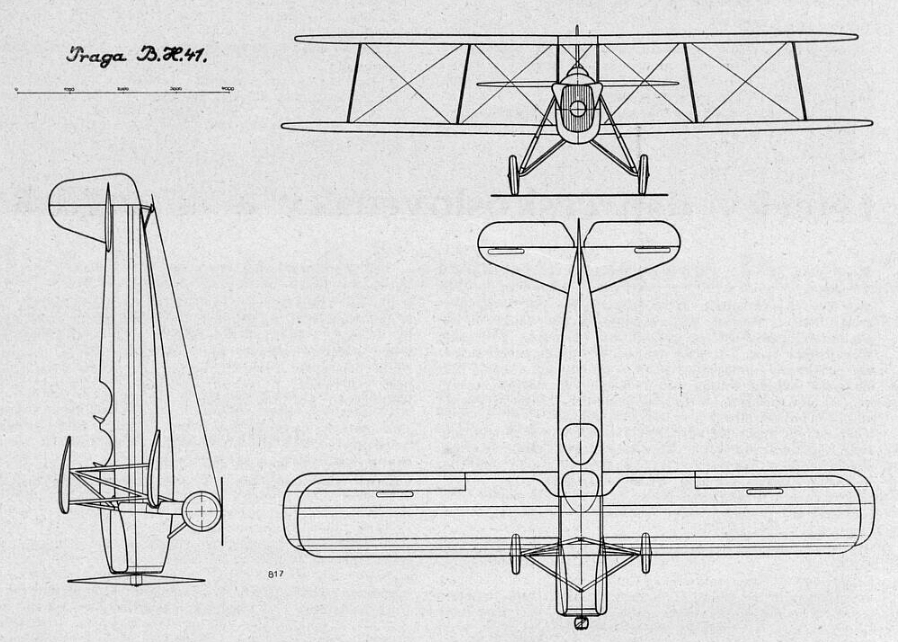
Three-view drawing, Praga BH-41

Data from Němeček 1968.

General characteristics

- Crew: Two, pilot and instructor
- Length: 8.30 m (27 ft 3 in)
- Wingspan: 11.15 m (36 ft 7 in)
- Height: 3.05 m (10 ft 0 in)
- Wing area: 28.6 m^{2} (308 sq ft)
- Empty weight: 1,185 kg (2,607 lb)
- Gross weight: 1,570 kg (3,454 lb)
- Powerplant: 1 × Walter Pollux II , 270 kW (360 hp)

Performance

- Maximum speed: 230 km/h (140 mph, 120 kn)
- Range: 750 km (465 mi, 404 nmi)
- Service ceiling: 5,700 m (18,700 ft)
- Rate of climb: 4.5 m/s (890 ft/min) to 3,000 m (9,843 ft)

== See also ==
Related development

- Praga E-39

Related lists

- List of Interwar military aircraft
