= Praga E-112 =

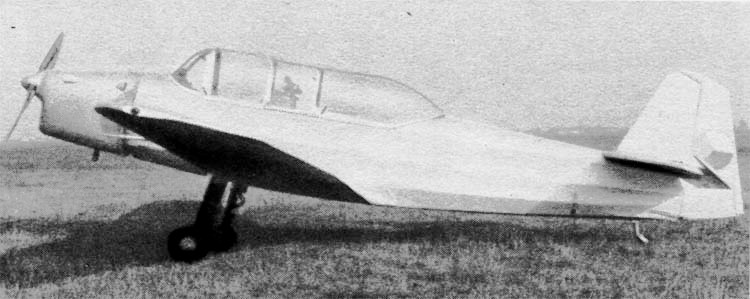

General information
- Type: Training aircraft
- National origin: Czechoslovakia
- Manufacturer: ČKD-Praga

History
- First flight: 14 September 1947

The Praga E-112 was a prototype Czechoslovak training aircraft of the 1940s. It was built to meet a requirement for an elementary trainer for both the Czechoslovak Air Force and civil use, first flying in September 1947. After testing, it was rejected in favour of the Zlín Z-26, and no production of the E-112 followed.

== Design and development ==
In 1946, a specification was issued for a two-seat basic training aircraft for use both by the Czechoslovak Air Force and civil users. The new aircraft was required to use a Walter Minor 4-III engine, and was to have a maximum speed of 200 km/h (110 kn; 120 mph), a cruise speed of 180 km/h (97 kn; 110 mph) and to be able to climb to 2,000 m (6,600 ft) in 13 minutes, and have a ceiling of 3,500 m (11,500 ft). Two designs competed to meet the specification, one from Zlín (the Zlín Z-26) and one from the ČKD-Praga design team led by Jaroslav Šlechta, the Praga E-112. (Note: In the 1930s, Šlechta had designed an unbuilt development of the Praga BH-111, also designated E-112, but despite the identical designation, the aircraft proposed for the 1946 specification was a new design.)

The Praga design, which was very similar to the competing Zlín, was a tractor configuration cantilever monoplane of mixed wood and metal construction with a fixed tailwheel undercarriage. The low-mounted wing was made of wood, while the fuselage had a welded steel-frame structure with fabric covering. The crew of two sat in tandem under a three-part plexiglass canopy, and were provided with dual controls.

Construction of the prototype was assigned to Letov at their Letňany, Prague factory, but the quality of construction was poor, with the aircraft overweight and showing a poor surface finish, particularly compared to the Z-26. It made its first flight at Letňany on 14 September 1947. A number of modifications were made as a result of factory testing, including revised tail surfaces and a modified engine cowling to improve cooling, but a more significant problem was that the aircraft's propeller was unsuitable, so that the engine would not run at the required speed. Both the E-112 and Z-26 were delivered for evaluation in February 1948. The E-112's speed was slightly below the 200 km/h required by the specification, while its climb rate was much poorer than required (it took 18 minutes, 23 s to reach 2000 m compared with the 13 min required by the specification), partly due to the poorly matched propeller and failed attempts to modify it to improve the aircraft's speed. As a result, the Z-26 was chosen to meet the requirement and ordered into production. Work continued to improve the E-112 into 1949, and fitting new propellers significantly improved performance, particularly climb rate, but this did not result in any production orders.

== Specifications ==
Data from Monografie: Praga E-112

General characteristics

- Crew: 2
- Length: 7.60 m (24 ft 11 in)
- Wingspan: 10.65 m (34 ft 11 in)
- Height: 2.25 m (7 ft 5 in)
- Wing area: 15.25 m^{2} (164.1 sq ft)
- Empty weight: 568 kg (1,252 lb)
- Gross weight: 835 kg (1,841 lb)
- Powerplant: 1 × Walter Minor 4-III 4-cylinder air-cooled in-line piston engine, 78 kW (105 hp)

Performance

- Maximum speed: 205 km/h (127 mph, 111 kn)
- Cruise speed: 180 km/h (110 mph, 97 kn)
- Range: 570 km (350 mi, 310 nmi)
- Service ceiling: 3,500 m (11,500 ft)
- Time to altitude: 15 minutes to 2,000 m (6,600 ft)
