= Praga E-45 =

Biplane fighter prototype

E-45
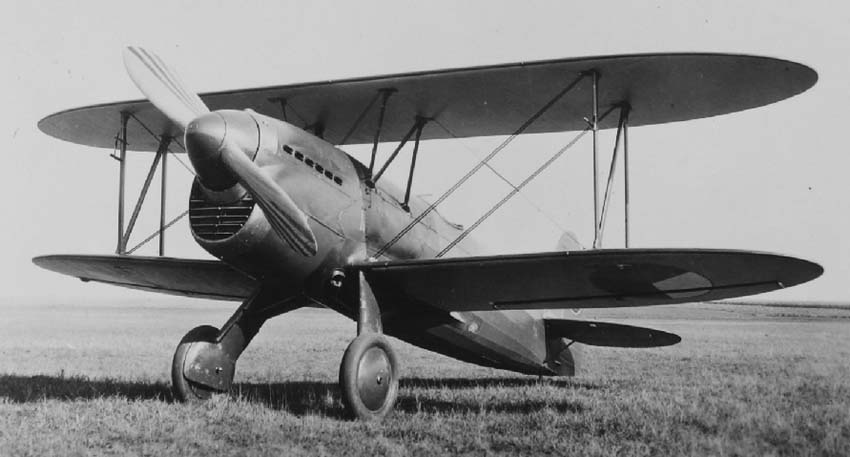
- Praga E-45

General information
- Type: Single-seat biplane fighter
- National origin: Czechoslovakia
- Manufacturer: ČKD-Praga
- Designer: Jaroslav Šlechta
- Number built: 1

History
- First flight: 8 October 1934

The Praga E-45 was a single-engined, single-seat biplane fighter built in Czechoslovakia in the mid-1930s. It appeared a little too late to compete with the similar Avia B-534 and failed to get a production order.

== Design and development ==
The Praga E-45 single-seat fighter was designed to compete with the Avia B-534, but flew some 17 months later. Since the two aircraft had very similar performance and the Avia was more heavily armed, it is not surprising that the Avia won a contract for over 400 aircraft and only one E-45 was built.

The E-45 was an equal span, single bay biplane with wings of slight stagger and no sweep. They were largely of constant chord, but had marked elliptical tips. The wings were wooden with plywood covering and a final sheath of fabric, the upper wings a single piece, connected to and held above the upper fuselage by a pair of outward sloping N form struts. The lower wings were attached to stubs integral with the lower fuselage. N-form interplane struts joined the wings, which were wire braced. Aerodynamically balanced ailerons covered almost all the trailing edge of the lower wing.

The fuselage was built around a rectangular steel tube structure. This was aluminium skinned around the engine, upper decking and extreme tail, and fabric covered over plywood elsewhere. The single cockpit was well aft of the wings and could be open or enclosed. The tailplane was wooden and plywood plus fabric covered, but the fin and control surfaces were fabric covered steel frames. The control surfaces were horn balanced, and the tail plane incidence could be trimmed in flight. The fin, too, was directionally adjustable, but only on the ground. The undercarriage was fixed, with semi-cantilever faired legs from the leading edge stubs braced high up the legs and inwards to the fuselage bottom with faired struts. The optionally spatted wheels were oleo damped and had differential brakes. There was a sprung tailskid.

The E-45 was powered by a 670 hp (500 kW) Rolls-Royce Kestrel XVI liquid-cooled V-12 engine, far less powerful than the Avia's Hispano-Suiza with 850 hp (625 kW). It drove a two-bladed propeller which had a large chin radiator immediately behind it. There was neither external exhaust piping nor stubs, just six small open ports per side. Two fixed 7.92 mm (0.312 in) calibre Type 30 machine guns were mounted in the upper cowling, firing through the propeller.

The E-45 first flew on 8 October 1934, with Smetena at the controls. By then a large order for the competing Avia 534 had been placed (August 1934) and the E-45 could only act as a reserve in case of production or other problems with the Avia, even though it seems to have flown quite well. No more were built and the sole example of the Praga E-45 eventually received a civil registration, OK-ERR in April 1938, after which nothing was heard of it.

== Specifications (wheel fairings, enclosed cockpit, metal airscrew) ==
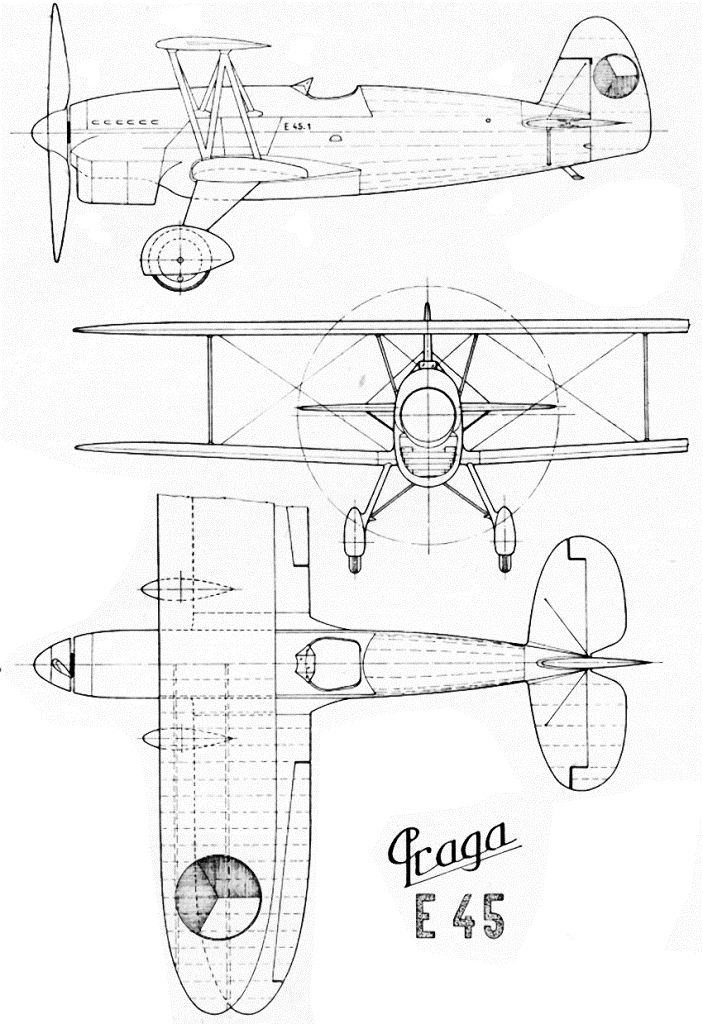
Orthographic line drawing of Praga E-45

Data from Grey 1972, p. 96c

General characteristics

- Crew: 1
- Length: 7.45 m (24 ft 5 in)
- Wingspan: 8.50 m (27 ft 11 in)
- Height: 3.0 m (9 ft 10 in)
- Wing area: 20.25 m^{2} (218.0 sq ft)
- Empty weight: 1,265 kg (2,789 lb)
- Gross weight: 1,710 kg (3,770 lb)
- Powerplant: 1 × Rolls-Royce Kestrel XVI Liquid-cooled V-12, 500 kW (670 hp)

Performance

- Maximum speed: 410 km/h (250 mph, 220 kn) at 4,420 m (14,500 ft)
- Cruise speed: 350 km/h (220 mph, 190 kn) at 4,420 m (14,500 ft)
- Range: 650 km (400 mi, 350 nmi) at cruising speed
- Service ceiling: 10,000 m (33,000 ft)
- Time to altitude: 3 min to 3,000 m (9,800 ft)

Armament

- Guns: 2×7.92 mm (0.312 in) Type 30 machine guns in upper cowling

== Cited sources ==
- Grey, C.G. (1972). Jane's All the World's Aircraft 1938. London: David & Charles. ISBN 0-7153-5734-4.
