= ČKD-Praga =

Czechoslovak aircraft manufacturer

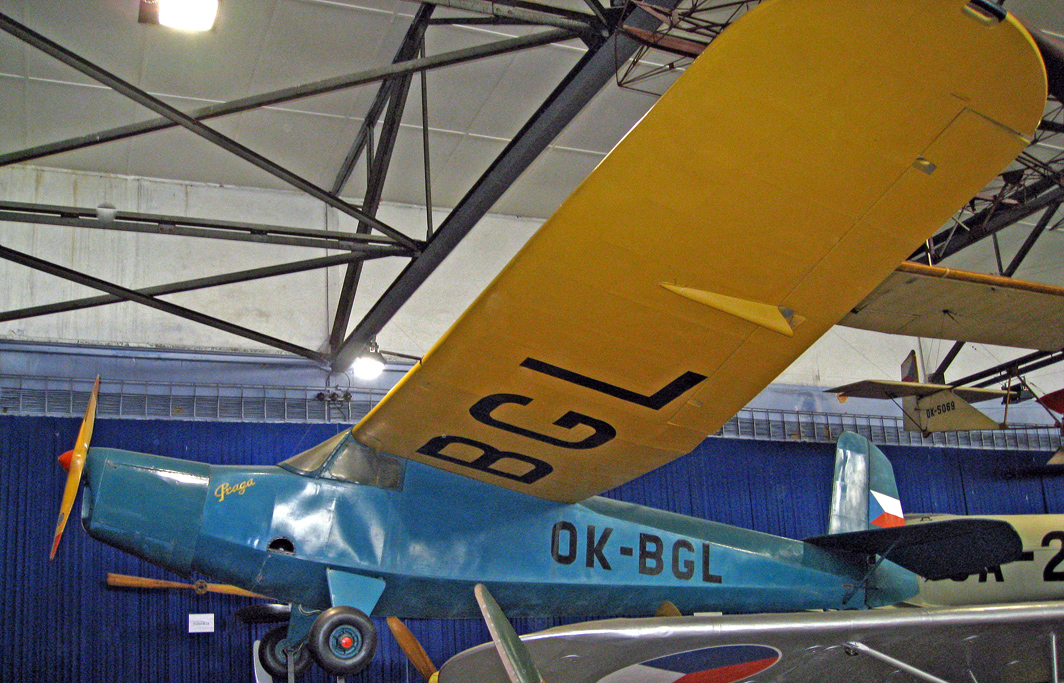
Praga E.114M displayed in the aviation museum at Prague-Kbely airfield

ČKD-Praga (Českomoravská-Kolben-Daněk Praga) was a Czechoslovak aircraft manufacturer. The company was founded in 1915 as an engine manufacturing company, under the designation Praga. The company started designing aircraft in 1930–31 when the designers Pavel Beneš and Miroslav Hajn came to ČKD-Praga from Avia. Their first aircraft was the Praga E-39 from 1931. It was a military trainer, with a production run of 139 aircraft. ČKD-Praga developed several aircraft over the following years, but none exceeded prototype stage.

Jaroslav Šlechta became chief designer in 1934 and designed the Praga E-114 Air Baby aircraft, which became a commercial success. The aircraft was sold to France, Iran, Romania and to Britain. Most of the British aircraft were manufactured locally in Manchester under a licence, by F. Hills & Sons as the Hillson Praga. 126 aircraft were ordered until 1946. Šlechta remained with Praga post war, designing the E-55 general purpose aircraft.

ČKD-Praga developed 17 aircraft designs, of which 7 entered series production.

== List of Praga aircraft ==
In the 1930s the company referred to designs by the initials of their designers' surnames, for example the BH-39 trainer, designed by Pavel Benes and Miroslav Hajn. The Czech government identified aircraft by manufacturer, each having a letter assigned to them. Praga's was E, so the BH-39 became the E-39.

This list may be incomplete: add to it, with sources if you can.

- E-36
- E-39 trainer - about 139 produced
- E-40 trainer - about 43 produced
- E-41
- E-44 biplane fighter?
- E-45 biplane fighter
- E-51 twin boom fighter
- E-55 post war general purpose
- E-112 post war trainer
- E-114 two seat sports - about 300 produced
- E-115 development of E-114
- E-117 development of E-114
- E-141 development of 41
- E-210 twin pusher tourer
- E-211 post war development of 210
- E-212 post war eight seat development of 210/211; probably not completed
- E-214 four seat tourer
- E-241 advanced trainer biplane - about 95 built
