= Hillson Pennine =

1930s British monoplane

General information
- Type: Two-seat cabin monoplane
- National origin: United Kingdom
- Manufacturer: F Hills & Sons
- Designer: Norman Skykes
- Number built: 1

History
- First flight: 4 February 1937

The Hillson Pennine was a 1930s United Kingdom two-seat cabin monoplane designed by Norman Sykes and built by F Hills & Sons of Trafford Park.

== Design and development ==
The Pennine was a small high-wing braced monoplane powered by a 36 hp (27 kW) Praga B two-cylinder piston engine, though originally designed for an 80 hp (60 kW) Aspin engine. It was built of wood and had fixed tailwheel landing gear. The Pennine, designed to be simple, had an unconventional control system with a normal elevator and spoilers on the leading edge of the mainplane, but had a fixed rudder with just a trim tab and no ailerons. Started in 1936 and completed in 1937, it was moved to Barton Aerodrome. The Pennine became airborne during a high-speed taxi test on 4 February 1937; the controls had not been adjusted and it took Sykes half-an-hour of circling to the left to get down safely. The aircraft was not flown again, the company concentrating on a design for a trainer (the Hillson Helvellyn), and with space a premium for wartime work the Pennine was dismantled. The registration G-AFBX was cancelled on 19 November 1945.

== Specifications ==
Data from British Civil Aircraft since 1919 Volume 3; British Light Aeroplanes; dimensions and weights are estimates

General characteristics

- Crew: 2
- Length: 21 ft 8 in (6.60 m)
- Wingspan: 36 ft 1 in (11.0 m)
- Wing area: 164 sq ft (15.24 m^{2})
- Empty weight: 584 lb (265 kg)
- Gross weight: 1,080 lb (490 kg)
- Powerplant: 1 × Praga B air-cooled horizontal twin , 36 hp (27 kW)
