= Walter NZ 120 =

1920s Czech piston aircraft engine

NZ 120
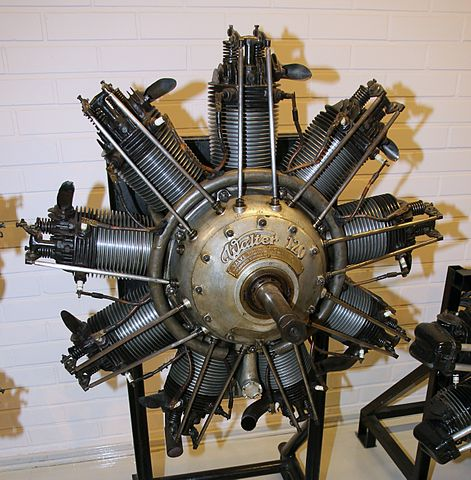
- Walter NZ 120 on display at the Aviation Museum of Central Finland
- Type: Radial aero engine
- National origin: Czechoslovakia
- Manufacturer: Walter Aircraft Engines
- First run: 1920s

The Walter NZ 120 was a nine-cylinder, air-cooled, radial engine for aircraft use. It was built in Czechoslovakia by Walter Aircraft Engines in the 1920s. Using common cylinders and parts from the NZ (Novák-Zeithammer) range of engines the NZ 120 produced up to 135 horsepower (99 kW).

== Applications ==
- Avia B.122
- Breda Ba.26
- Fizir FN
- Junkers K 16
- Letov Š-218
- Praga BH-39NZ
- RWD 8

== Specifications ==
=== General characteristics ===
- Type: Nine-cylinder radial piston engine
- Bore: 105 mm (4.134 in)
- Stroke: 120 mm (4.724 in)
- Displacement: 9.352 L (570.7 cu in)
- Dry weight: 148 kg (326 lb)

=== Components ===
- Valvetrain: Overhead valve, two poppet valves per cylinder
- Cooling system: Air-cooled
- Reduction gear: Direct drive

=== Performance ===
- Power output: 99.3 kW (135 hp) at 1,750 rpm (take-off power)
- Compression ratio: 4.48:1

== See also ==
Related development

- Walter NZ 60

Related lists

- List of aircraft engines
