= Walter Pollux =

1930s Czech piston aircraft engine

Pollux
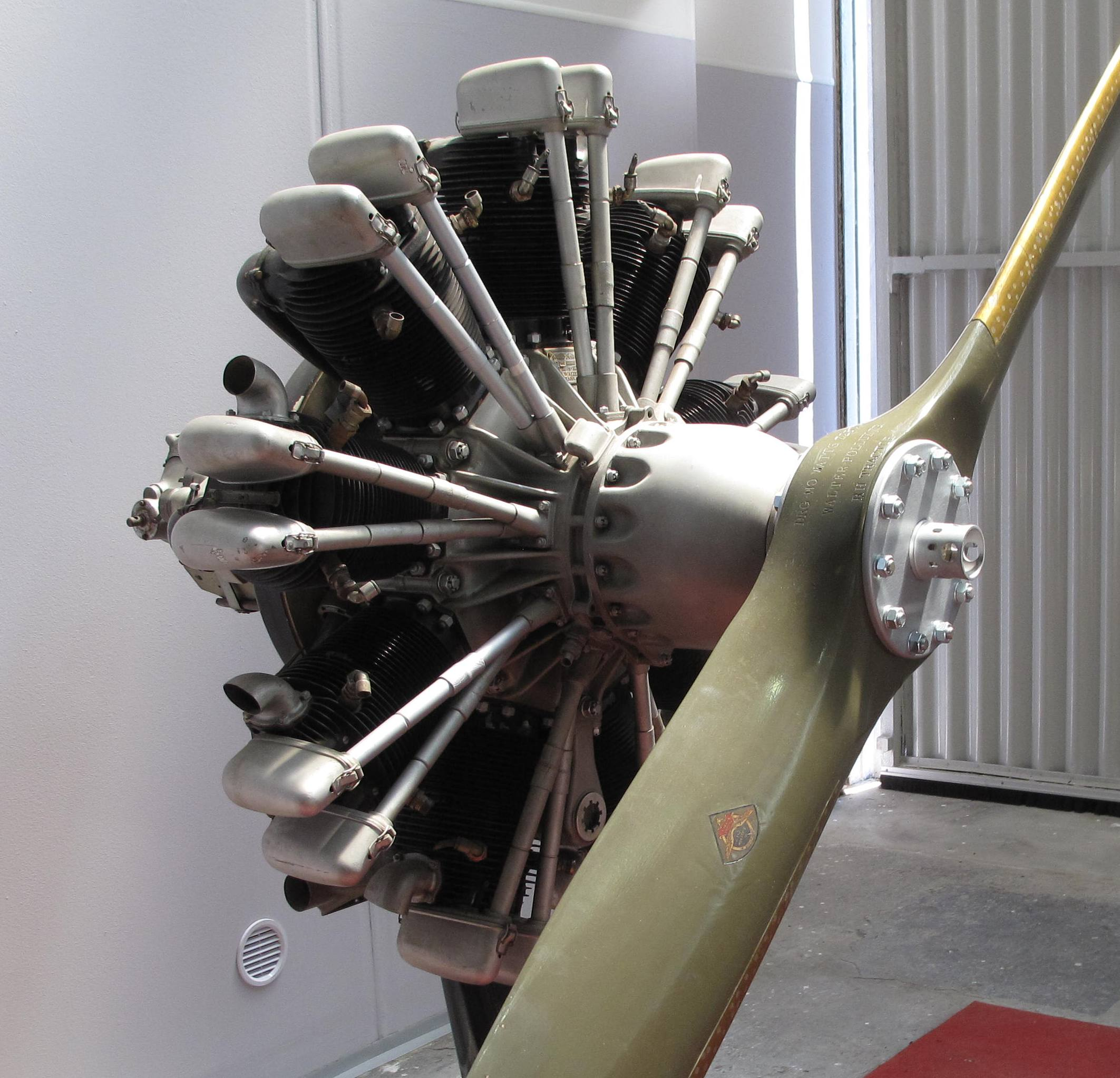
- Walter Pollux IIR
- Type: Radial aero engine
- National origin: Czechoslovakia
- Manufacturer: Walter Aircraft Engines
- First run: 1936

The Walter Pollux is a Czechoslovak nine-cylinder, air-cooled, radial engine, built by Walter Aircraft Engines for powering light aircraft and that first ran in 1936. The engine produces 240 kW (320 hp) at 1,800 rpm.

The first known use was on the Fieseler F 2 Tiger in 1934.

== Variants ==
Pollux II
Direct drive engine
Pollux II-R
Geared engine, reduction ratio 0.666:1

== Applications ==
- Aero A.204
- Avia B.122
- Fieseler F2 Tiger
- Praga BH-41

== Engines on display ==
A preserved example of the Walter Pollux engine is on display at the following museum:

- Prague Aviation Museum, Kbely

== Specifications (Pollux II) ==
Data from Flight, Jane's all the World's Aircraft 1931

=== General characteristics ===
- Type: 9-cylinder radial piston engine
- Bore: 135 mm (5.3 in)
- Stroke: 170 mm (6.7 in)
- Length: 1,220 mm (48 in)
- Diameter: 1,254 mm (49.4 in)
- Dry weight: 323 kg (712 lb); Pollux IIR 341 kg (751 lb)-geared

=== Components ===
- Valvetrain: One intake and one exhaust valve per cylinder
- Fuel system: One Zenith double 60DCJ carburettor
- Fuel type: Benzine - Benzol 50:50
- Oil system: dry sump pressure feed
- Cooling system: Air-cooled
- Reduction gear: Pollux IIR - 0.666:1

=== Performance ===
- Power output: Normal:240 kW (320 hp) at 1,800 rpm; maximum 280 kW (380 hp) at 1,900 rpm
- Compression ratio: 6:1
- Specific fuel consumption: 0.282 kg/kWh (0.464 lb/(hp⋅h))
- Oil consumption: 0.013 or 0.021 kg/kWh (0.022 or 0.035 lb/(hp⋅h))
- Power-to-weight ratio: 1 kW/kg (0.61 hp/lb)

== See also ==
Comparable engines

- Alvis Leonides
- Pratt & Whitney R-1340 Wasp

Related lists

- List of aircraft engines
