= Fieseler F2 Tiger =

German aircraft

F2 Tiger
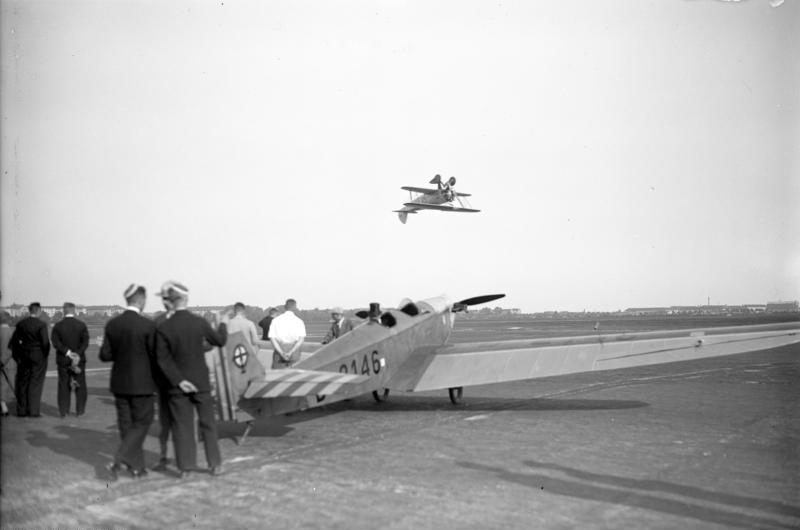
- Gerhard Fieseler demonstrating his new Fieseler F2 at a 1932 air display over the Berlin Central Airport

General information
- Type: Aerobatic trainer
- National origin: Germany
- Manufacturer: Fieseler Flugzeugbau
- Designer: Gerhard Fieseler
- Number built: 1

History
- First flight: ca 1932

The Fieseler F2 Tiger was a German single-seat aerobatic biplane which was flown to victory in the 1934 World Aerobatics Competition (WAC) by its designer/builder Gerhard Fieseler.

== Design and development ==
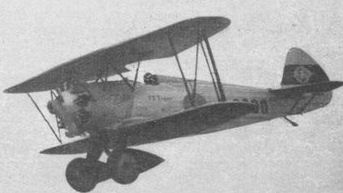
Fieseler F2 Tiger photo L'Aerophile November 1933

Gerhard Fieseler started his own company in 1930 in the former Segelflugzeugbau company at Kassel, Germany. Fieseler was a World War I German fighter ace with almost 20 kills to his credit, and became a world class competition aerobatic pilot. To compete in International competitions Fieseler designed and built the Fieseler F2 Tiger single-seat biplane, powered by a 450 hp (340 kW) Walter Pollux II air-cooled 9-cylinder radial.

The 1934 World Aerobatics Competition, held in Paris, was the first of its kind, and, despite the deaths of two pilots and a few crashes, the competition continued and Fieseler won, although he went over the time limit due to a loose harness, beating his nearest competitor, Michel Detroyat of France (who flew an M.S.225), by 23 points (645.2 to 622.9). Fieseler retired from the sport undefeated with his victory.

The F2 Tiger itself would form the basis for later aircraft, including the Fieseler F5. It was built by Fieseler's own aircraft company, Fieseler Flugzeugbau (later, Gerhard Fieseler Werke). The F2 served as both an important forerunner of later German aircraft which would go on to fight for the Third Reich in WWII, and as a famous piece of inter-war aircraft design, as well as being the winning aircraft of the first WAC.

== Specifications ==
General characteristics

- Crew: 1
- Length: 6.85 m (22 ft 6 in)
- Wingspan: 8.16 m (26 ft 9 in)
- Height: 2.8 m (9 ft 2 in)
- Wing area: 23 m^{2} (250 sq ft)
- Empty weight: 800 kg (1,764 lb)
- Gross weight: 1,200 kg (2,646 lb)
- Powerplant: 1 × Walter Pollux II nine-cylinder, air-cooled radial piston engine, 310 kW (420 hp)

Performance

- Maximum speed: 240 km/h (150 mph, 130 kn)
- Cruise speed: 210 km/h (130 mph, 110 kn)
- Range: 750 km (470 mi, 400 nmi)

== See also ==
- List of aircraft of the WW2 Luftwaffe
- Aerobatics
