= Praga E-40 =

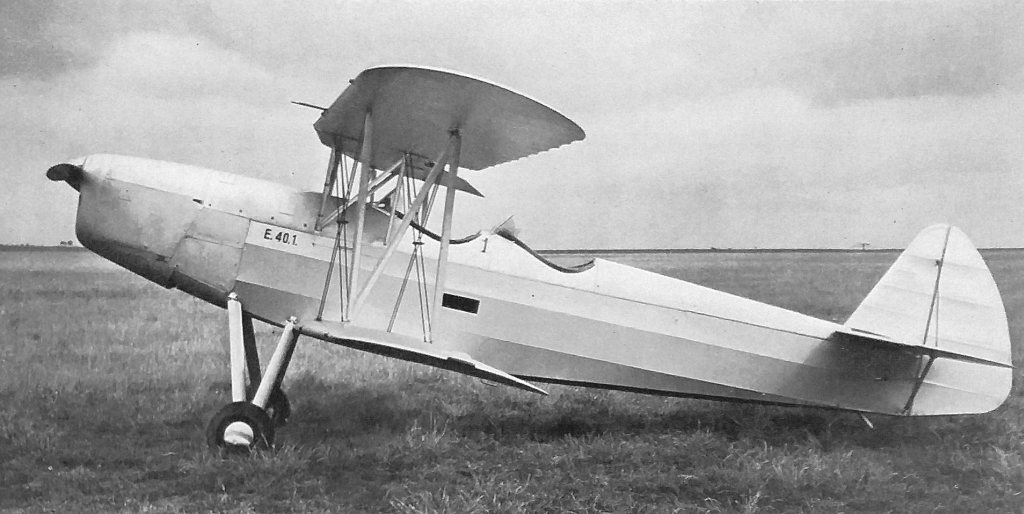

General information
- Type: Basic trainer
- National origin: Czechoslovakia
- Manufacturer: ČKD-Praga
- Number built: 1?

History
- First flight: c.1936

The Praga E-40 was a single engine, two seat, biplane basic trainer, built in Czechoslovakia in the mid-1930s.

== Design and development ==
The E-40, one of several Praga trainer designs, was a single-bay biplane with open, tandem cockpits. The swept wings had twin wooden spars and a mixture of plywood and fabric covering. Ailerons were fitted to the lower wing and the upper wing had a cut-out on its trailing edge to enhance visibility from the forward cockpit. The N-form interplane struts were steel and the bay braced with streamlined wires. A pair of vertical N-form struts joined the wing centre section to the upper fuselage. The fixed tail surfaces were wood framed and plywood covered; the tailplane was strut braced from below. Elevators and rudder were fabric covered over steel frames. The rudder had a trim tab.

The fuselage of the E-40 was a steel structure, rigidly braced at the front and wire braced aft. The nose and the upper decking were covered with detachable steel panels; fabric covering was used elsewhere. Fuel and engine oil tanks were in the fuselage. The E-40 was powered by a four-cylinder 63/71 kW (85/95 hp) Walter Minor air-cooled, inverted piston engine driving a two-blade propeller. It had a split type main undercarriage with wheels on V-form legs mounted just forward of the wing leading edge. Rubber-in-compression spring units were mounted in extended hubs; the pistons of these units were held in place on a shallow, inverted V strut, itself attached to the lower fuselage via a steel tube pyramid. The tailwheel castored and had rubber springing within the rear fuselage.

== Operational history ==
There are no records of the E-40 entering production and it is possible that only the prototype, OK-EDA, was built.

== Specifications ==
Data from Jane's All the World's Aircraft 1938.

General characteristics

- Crew: 2
- Length: 8.15 m (26 ft 9 in)
- Wingspan: 9.0 m (29 ft 6 in)
- Height: 2.85 m (9 ft 4 in)
- Wing area: 20.6 m^{2} (222 sq ft)
- Empty weight: 470 kg (1,036 lb)
- Gross weight: 720 kg (1,587 lb)
- Powerplant: 1 × Walter Minor 4-cylinder inverted air-cooled, 63 kW (85 hp)
- Propellers: 2-bladed

Performance

- Maximum speed: 165 km/h (103 mph, 89 kn)
- Cruise speed: 135 km/h (84 mph, 73 kn)
- Range: 500 km (310 mi, 270 nmi)
- Service ceiling: 4,000 m (13,000 ft)
- Time to altitude: 16 min to 2,000 m (6,560 ft)
