= Zlín 22 =

Czech light aircraft

22 Junák
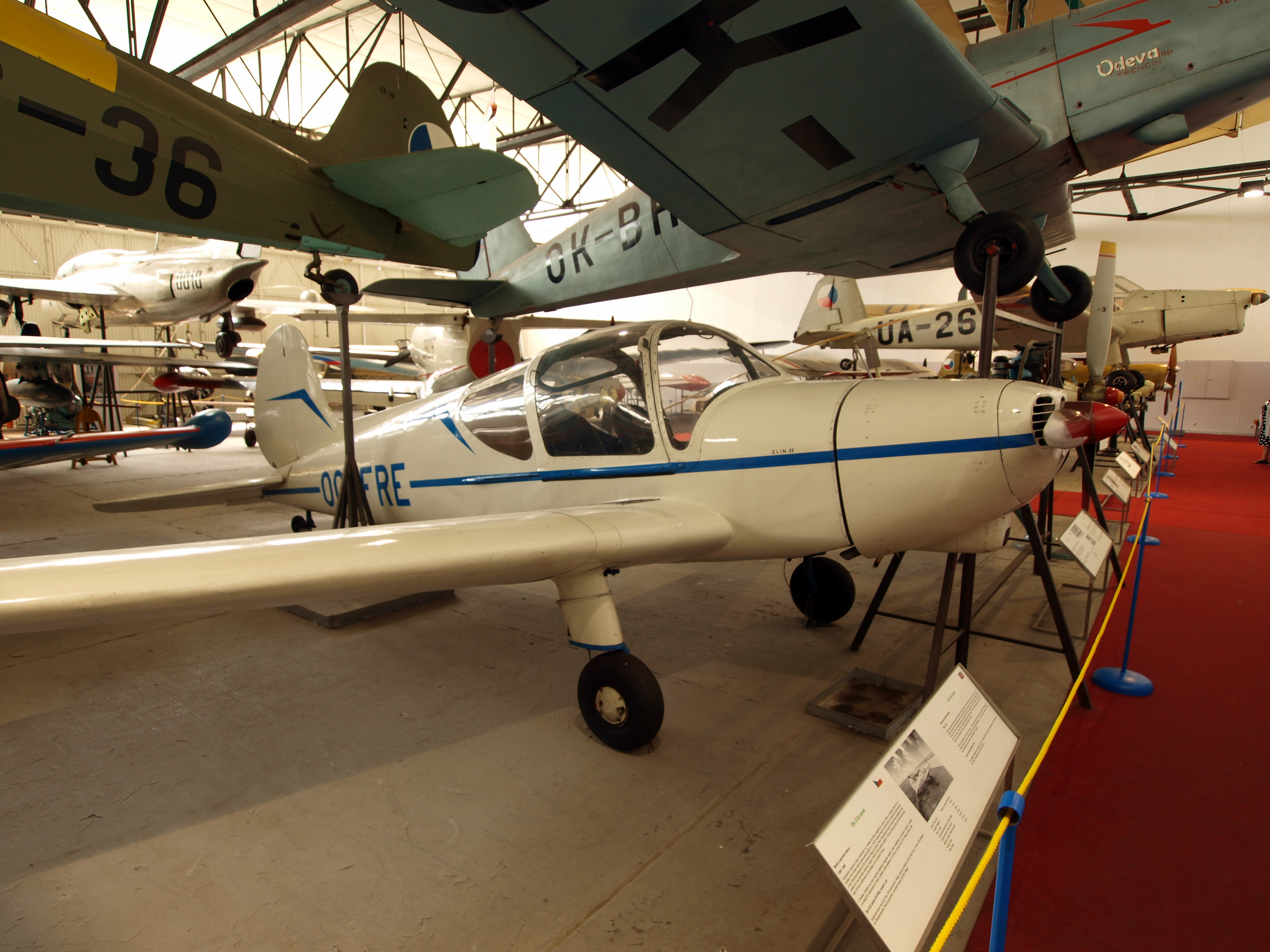

General information
- Type: Two-seat cabin monoplane
- National origin: Czech Republic
- Manufacturer: Zlin
- Number built: 200

History
- First flight: 10 April 1947
- Developed from: Zlin 381

The Zlín 22 Junák was a 1940s two-seat cabin monoplane, developed from the Zlín 381 (a licence-built Bücker Bü 181).

== Development ==
Although based on the Zlin 381, the Junák had side-by-side seating for two. It was a low-wing cantilever monoplane with a conventional tailwheel landing gear. It was powered by a nose-mounted 75 hp (56 kW) Praga D engine, although the prototype had a 57 hp (43 kW) Persy III engine. A three-seat variant, the Zlin 22M, was developed and two prototypes of a three/four-seat tourer variant, the Zlin 122, were built.

== Variants ==
Zlin Z 22
Prototype with a 57 hp (43 kW) Persy III engine.
Zlin Z 22D
Production two-seat variant with a 75 hp (56 kW) Praga D engine.
Zlin Z 22M
Three-seat variant with a 105 hp (78 kW)) Walter Minor 4-III engine.
Zlin Z 122
Three/four seat development with a 105hp (78kW) Zlin Toma 4 engine, two prototypes only.

== Operators ==
The 50 pcs Zlín Z-22 was exported into Romania and other 25 pcs to other WE states.

Czechoslovakia

- Czechoslovak Air Force

== Specifications (22D) ==
Data from Jane's All The World's Aircraft 1953–54

General characteristics

- Crew: 1
- Capacity: 1 passenger
- Length: 7.25 m (23 ft 9 in)
- Wingspan: 10.60 m (34 ft 9 in)
- Height: 1.96 m (6 ft 5 in)
- Wing area: 14.65 m^{2} (157.7 sq ft)
- Empty weight: 370 kg (816 lb)
- Gross weight: 650 kg (1,433 lb)
- Fuel capacity: 72 L (19 US gal; 16 imp gal) normal, provision for additional 65 L (17 US gal; 14 imp gal) tank
- Powerplant: 1 × Praga D air-cooled flat-four engine, 56 kW (75 hp)

Performance

- Maximum speed: 180 km/h (110 mph, 97 kn)
- Cruise speed: 160 km/h (99 mph, 86 kn)
- Range: 1,200 km (750 mi, 650 nmi)
- Service ceiling: 3,800 m (12,500 ft)
- Rate of climb: 2.3 m/s (460 ft/min)
