= Praga B2 =

B2
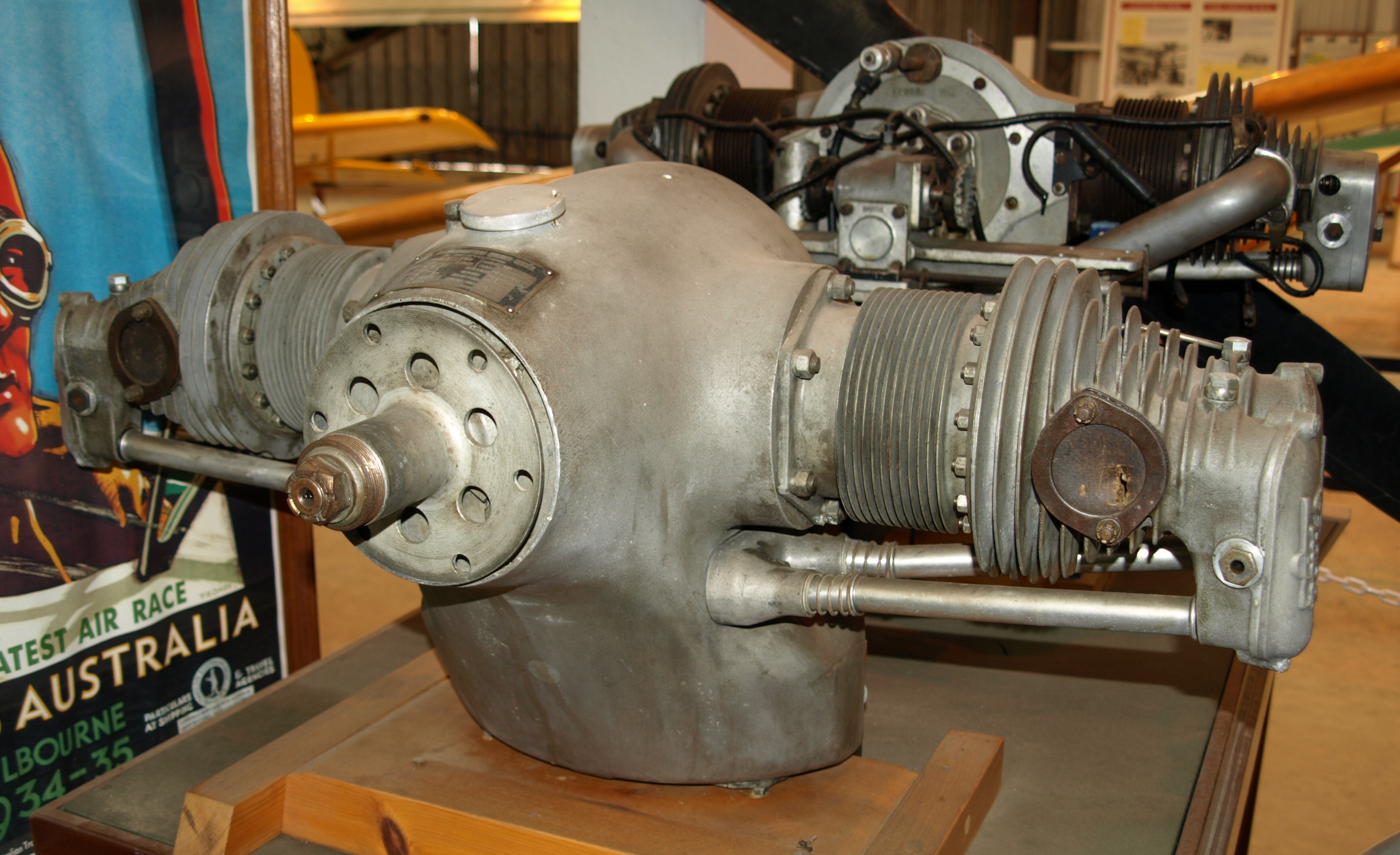
- Jowett-Praga B on display at the Shuttleworth Collection
- Type: Air-cooled flat twin
- National origin: Czechoslovakia
- Manufacturer: Praga, Ceskomoravska-Kolben-Danek Co.
- Number built: 135

The Praga B2 was a low powered aero engine suitable for very light aircraft. It dates from the mid-1930s.

== Design ==
The Praga B2 was a dual ignition, air-cooled horizontal twin producing 40 horsepower (30 kW) aimed at lightweight aircraft. It was a higher compression version (6.7:1 from the earlier 5.72:1) of the original and otherwise very similar Praga B, which provided 36 hp (27 kW). Its cylinders were machined from alloy steel forgings and had aluminium alloy heads. The pistons were of aluminium alloy, with three compression rings and one scraper ring. The connecting rods were of nitrided steel, with divided big ends and bronze bushes at the little ends. The one piece crankshaft was also formed from nitrided steel and had two main roller bearings and a single ball thrust bearing. The single piece crankcase was cast from an aluminium alloy.

135 units in all, including B and B2 variants were built. Jowett Cars Ltd. of Idle, Bradford in the UK obtained a licence in 1936 to build the Praga B engine, for installation into the licence built Hillson Praga. Immediately after the end of World War II the Praga B2 was on display at the 1946 Paris Air Show.

== Applications (B & B2) ==
- Alaparma A.M.10 Tucano
- AVEX Yakstas Racer

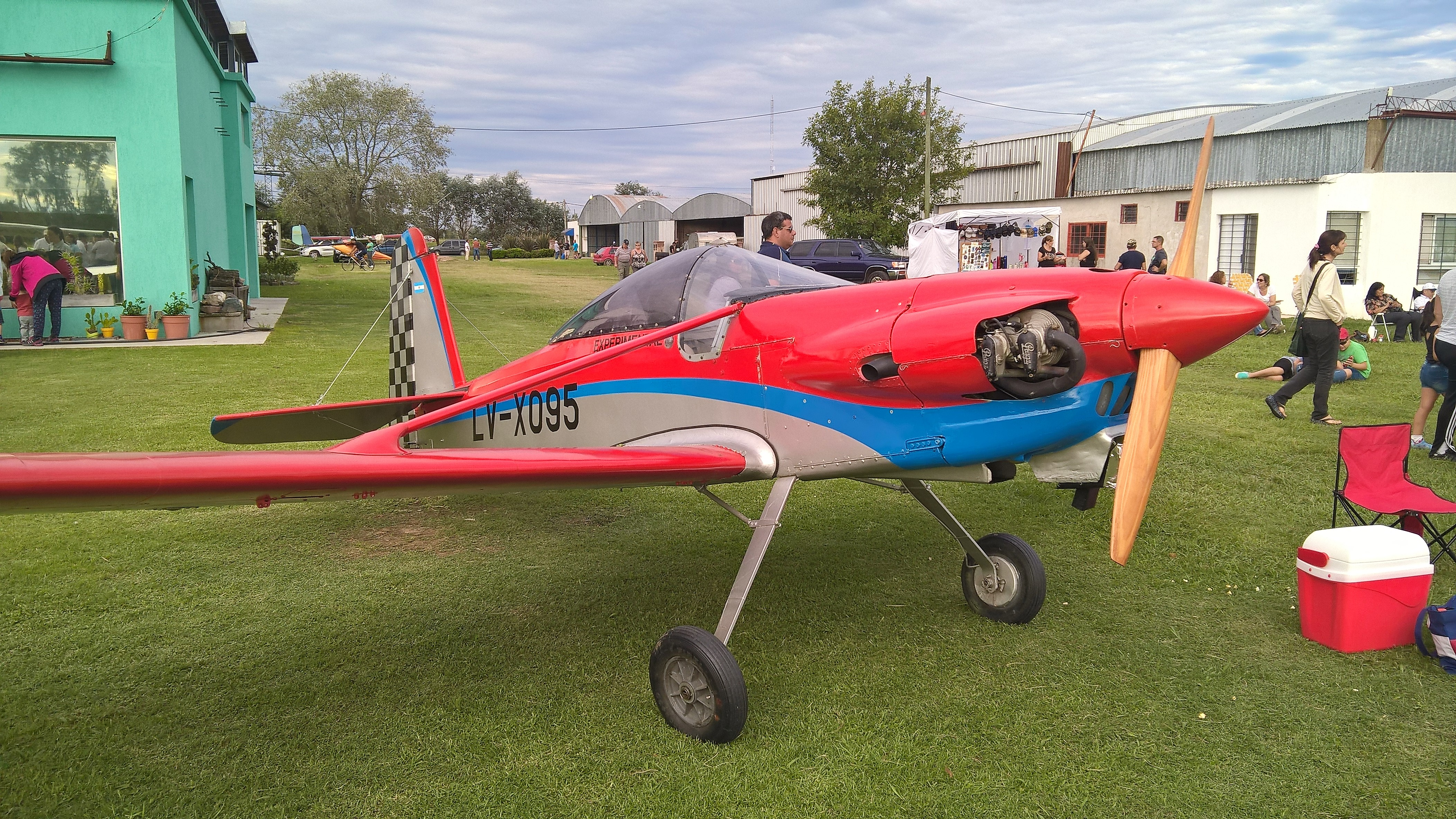
Yakstas LV-X095 en EAA Gral. Rodriguez 2017

- de Schelde Scheldemeeuw
- de Schelde Scheldemusch
- Hillson Pennine
- Mignet Flying Flea
- Praga E.114/Hillson Praga

== Specifications (B2) ==
Data from Grey 1972 p.32d

=== General characteristics ===
- Type: 2-cylinder horizontally opposed
- Bore: 105 mm (4.13 in)
- Stroke: 110 mm (4.49 in)
- Displacement: 1.906 L (116 cu in )
- Length: 610 mm (24.0 in)
- Width: 854 mm (33.6 in)
- Height: 515 mm (20.3 in)
- Dry weight: 48 kg (106 lb) (with airscrew hub)

=== Components ===
- Valvetrain: Two alloy steel valves per cylinder at 50°, aluminium-nickel-bronze valve seats. Two ball bearings to each rocker arm, grease gun lubricated in oil tight rocker-box. Push-rods and tappets in aluminium sleeves.
- Fuel system: Zenith 42M, mixture passing through sump in pipe to avoid condensation. Two BTH magnetos supplying two plugs/cylinder.
- Oil system: Integral with 4.5 L (7.9 pt) sump. Pressure and scavenge pumps, filtered; pressure feed to big and little ends.
- Cooling system: Air-cooled, finned cylinders
- Reduction gear: Direct, right hand tractor.

=== Performance ===
- Power output: 31.1 kW (41.7 hp) at 2,440 rpm
- Specific power: 16.3 kW/L (0.36 hp/cu in)
- Compression ratio: 6.7:1
- Fuel consumption: at 2,440 rpm 9.38 kg/h (20.68 1b/h)
- Specific fuel consumption: 0.225 kg/hp/h (0.495 lb/hp/h)
- Oil consumption: 0.2-0.3 kg/hp/h (0.44-0.66 lb/hp/h)
- Power-to-weight ratio: 0.65 kW/kg (0.4 hp/lb)

== See also ==
Related lists

- List of aircraft engines
