= Praga E-39 =

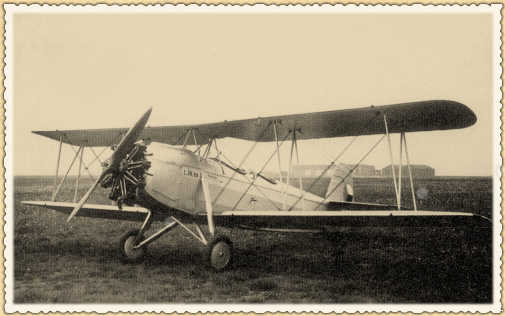

General information
- Type: Primary trainer, reconnaissance aircraft
- Manufacturer: ČKD-Praga
- Designer: Pavel Beneš and Miroslav Hajn
- Primary users: Czechoslovak Air Force Slovak Air Force
- Number built: 139

History
- First flight: June 1931

Praga E-39/BH-39 was a Czechoslovak trainer aircraft.

== History ==
This aircraft was designed by Pavel Beneš and Miroslav Hajn, engineers at the Czech aviation company ČKD-Praga in 1931. It flew for the first time in June of that year. The biplane, standard configuration for that era, was an immediate success and orders were placed by the Czechoslovak Air Force that used them as elementary training aircraft at its flight schools throughout the 1930s. Pre-World War II production of the machine was 139 units. In 1939 following the German occupation of Bohemia and Moravia, Slovakia became an independent country. It was a German ally and its small air force was placed under Luftwaffe control. Ten of the Praga E-39s were initially used as trainers by the Slovak Air Force. During the German invasion of the Soviet Union they were transferred to the Soviet front where they were employed by the Slovaks as reconnaissance platforms in support of German ground forces. Other E-39s were used by the Luftwaffe in their flight training schools as elementary trainers, and still others were given to the Hungarian Air Force for use in that same role.

== Variants ==
E-39NZ / BH-39NZ
Powered by an 89.4 kW (120 hp) Walter NZ 120, nine-cylinder air-cooled radial engine.
E-39G / BH-39G
Powered by a 112 kW (150 hp) Walter Gemma, nine-cylinder air-cooled radial engine.

E-39AG / BH-39AG
Powered by a 112 kW (150 hp) Armstrong Siddeley Genet Major, seven-cylinder air-cooled radial engine.

== Operators ==
Czechoslovakia

- Czechoslovak Air Force

Germany

- Luftwaffe

Hungary

- Royal Hungarian Air Force

Slovakia

- Slovak Air Force (1939–1945)
- Slovak Insurgent Air Force

== Specifications (BH-39NZ) ==
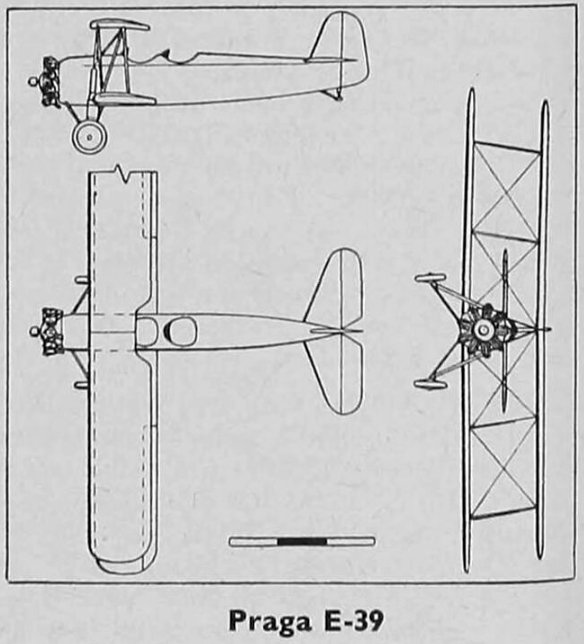
Three-view drawing of Praga E-39

Data from Valka.cz

General characteristics

- Crew: Two, pilot and instructor
- Length: 6.88 m (22 ft 7 in)
- Wingspan: 9.88 m (32 ft 5 in)
- Height: 2.54 m (8 ft 4 in)
- Empty weight: 609 kg (1,343 lb)
- Powerplant: 1 × Walter NZ 120 9-cylinder, air-cooled, radial piston engine , 89.4 kW (120 hp)

Performance

- Maximum speed: 170 km/h (110 mph, 92 kn)
- Range: 483 km (465 mi, 404 nmi)
- Service ceiling: 3,566 m (11,699 ft)

== See also ==
Related lists

- List of Interwar military aircraft
