= De Schelde Scheldemusch =

Scheldemusch
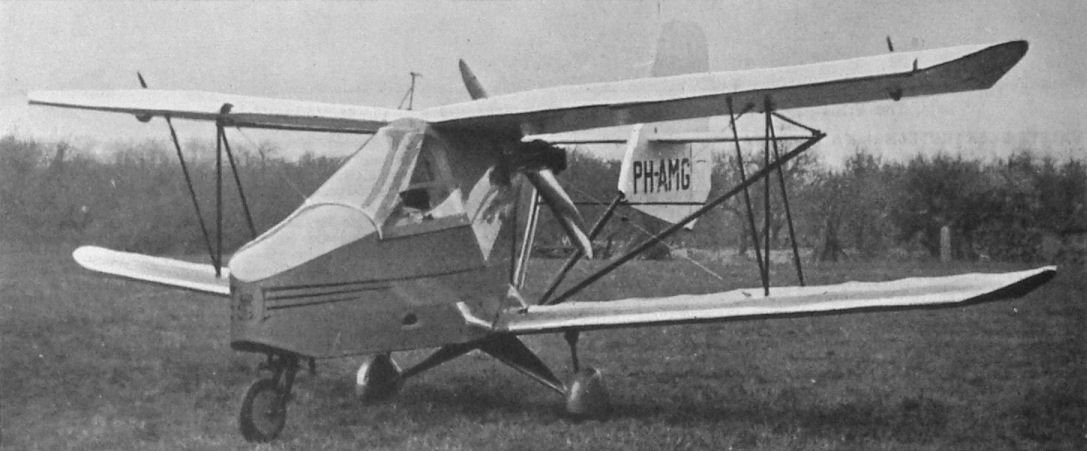

General information
- Type: Single seat sport and trainer aircraft
- National origin: Netherlands
- Manufacturer: NV Koninklijke Maatschappij De Schelde
- Designer: T.E. Slot
- Number built: 6

History
- First flight: November 1935

The de Schelde Scheldemusch was a single-seat pusher biplane designed in the Netherlands to be easy and safe to fly. It was one of the first light aircraft to use a tricycle undercarriage. Despite a sales campaign in the UK, only six were built, one being briefly tested by the RAF. A single example of a flying boat version, one of the smallest of this class, was also built.

== Design and development ==
In 1935 the Dutch dockyard NV Koninklijke Maatschappij De Schelde, based at Vlissingen (Flushing) on the Schelde (Scheldt) estuary moved into aircraft manufacture with the acquisition of the staff of the Pander Company. Under their designer Theodor E. Slot, de Schelde produced several different aircraft, the second of which was the Scheldemusch. In pre-war Dutch "musch" translated to English as "sparrow", though modern Dutch would use "mus" and the name sometimes appears as Scheldemus. It was also sometimes anglicized to Scheldt Sparrow. The unconventional appearance of the pusher biplane Scheldemusch, with its then novel tricycle undercarriage, was the result of the intention to produce a novice's aircraft, easy and forgiving to fly and to land.

The Scheldemusch was a single-bay biplane with staggered wings of equal span and equal, constant chord. They were built from twin wooden spars, plywood covered in the vulnerable regions of the leading edge and the underside between the N-form interplane struts. The remaining areas were fabric covered. Both wings had pronounced dihedral; the upper one carried ailerons and leading edge Handley Page slots.

There was no fuselage in the conventional sense, rather a nacelle for pilot and engine and a number of rearward booms to carry the tail. The nacelle was flat sided and just wide enough to accommodate the pilot, who sat under flexible glazing below the leading edge of the upper wing. It was a steel-framed, fabric-covered structure. The nose of the aircraft was easily removable to give access to the rear of the instrument panel. Behind the pilot was a small baggage hold, externally accessed and the 40 hp (30 kW) Praga B2 two-cylinder engine was at the rear of the nacelle, driving a two-bladed pusher propeller with its boss only just below the upper wing. Two horizontal steel booms converged from that wing, just inboard of the interplane struts to the tips of the tailplane. Three more beams spread out from the base of the nacelle upwards, the outer pair joining those from the upper wing forming the tailplane extremities and the central one supporting the rudder and inner tailplane. Thus the tailplane had angular tips and a straight leading edge, and the elevators had a triangular cut out for rudder movement. Because of the short length of these booms the fin and rudder, both of which extended above and below the tailplane had to be generous in area. The tail surfaces were fabric covered over a wooden structure. The main undercarriage was mounted on splayed, sprung and faired legs attached to the rear of the nacelle plus vertical long stroke shock absorbers. The steerable nosewheel had the same diameter as the main wheels.

The first prototype, registered PH-ALB, first flew in November 1935. In all, six were built over the next two years but despite good reviews the hoped for sales did not happen. de Schelte sold licence build rights in the UK to Aircraft Constructions Ltd of Sidcup, but demonstrator PH-AM was lost in a crash whilst demonstrating at Gravesend at the start of a sales tour in March 1937. One other Scheldemusch was lost in an accident in 1937 and three more were destroyed during the occupation of the Netherlands by Germany in World War II. The only Scheldemusch to survive the war was PH-AMG, which had gone to England as a replacement demonstrator. It was briefly considered by the RAF, appearing with both roundels and its Dutch civil registration. At the end of the war it was advertised for sale at £235 and there were reports that it survived until 1960, but there is no evidence that it flew in that time.

== The Scheldemeeuw variants ==
Not long after building the Scheldemusch prototype, de Schelde also brought out a flying boat version called the Scheldemeeuw (meeuw = gull). Wings, empennage and much of the rest of the aircraft was the same as the Scheldemusch. The fuselage was necessarily different, with the nacelle replaced with a wooden structured and plywood-skinned, single-step hull which extended rearwards almost to the tail. The longer fuselage made the attachment of the tail rather easier, three steel wires replacing the lower triplet of booms. The engine mounting and pilot's cockpit were little changed, though the flexible glazing was replaced with flat upright and more robust glass panels There were small floats fixed directly onto the underside of the lower wings for stability on water. Performance was similar to that of the Scheldemusch.

This, too failed to sell and in 1938 the sole example PH-ALK was fitted with a new, metal hull and re-registered as PH-ATM. This was done to provide De Schelde with experience in building metal hull, as they were tooling up to licence build the Dornier Do.24K for the Royal Netherlands Naval Air Service.

== Specifications (Scheldemusch) ==
Data from Grey 1972, pp. 206–7c

General characteristics

- Crew: 1
- Length: 5.3 m (17 ft 5 in)
- Wingspan: 6.7 m (22 ft 0 in)
- Height: 2.5 m (8 ft 2 in)
- Wing area: 13.2 m^{2} (142 sq ft)
- Empty weight: 200 kg (441 lb)
- Gross weight: 300 kg (661 lb)
- Powerplant: 1 × Praga B2 2-cylinder opposed air-cooled , 30 kW (40 hp)

Performance

- Maximum speed: 125 km/h (78 mph, 68 kn)
- Cruise speed: 105 km/h (65 mph, 56 kn)
- Stall speed: 60 km/h (37 mph, 32 kn)
- Range: 300 km (186 mi, 162 nmi)
