= Praga D =

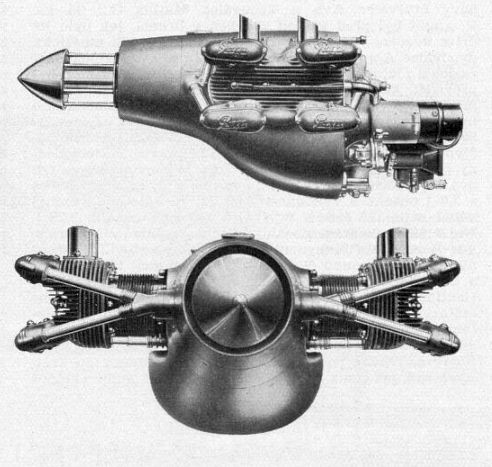
- Type: Air-cooled piston engine
- National origin: Czechoslovakia
- Manufacturer: Praga
- First run: 1936

The Praga Hostivař D was a four-cylinder, air-cooled, horizontally opposed aircraft engine first produced in Czechoslovakia in 1936 but which enjoyed its greatest success after World War II due to the explosion in popularity of sports flying. A version for helicopters was produced post World War II as the Praga DH

== Applications ==
- Mráz M-2 Skaut
- Aero XE-II
- IFIL-Reghin RG-6 (1957)

== Specifications (Praga D) ==
Data from Jane's All The World's Aircraft 1951–52.

=== General characteristics ===
- Type: four-cylinder, air-cooled, horizontally opposed
- Bore: 95 mm (3.74 in)
- Stroke: 100 mm (3.93 in)
- Displacement: 2.836 L (173 cu in)
- Length: 894 mm (35.19 in) (with propeller boss)
- Width: 810 mm (31.89 in)
- Height: 546 mm (21.5 in)
- Dry weight: 67 kg (148 lb)

=== Components ===
- Valvetrain: 1 inlet and 1 outlet valve per cylinder
- Fuel system: Zenith carburettor
- Fuel type: 72 octane
- Oil system: Dry sump pressure lubrication
- Cooling system: air

=== Performance ===
- Power output: 56 kW (75 hp) at 2,650 rpm
- Cruising power: 42 kW (56 hp) at 2,400 rpm
- Specific power: 19.7 kW/L (0.43 hp/cu in)
- Compression ratio: 6:1
- Specific fuel consumption: 235 g/hp hour (0.52 lb/hp hr) at rated power, 220 g/hp hour (0.48 lb/hp hr) at cruise power
- Oil consumption: 2 - 6 g/hp hour (0.004–0.013 lb/hp hour)

== See also ==
Related lists

- List of aircraft engines
