= M53/59 Praga =

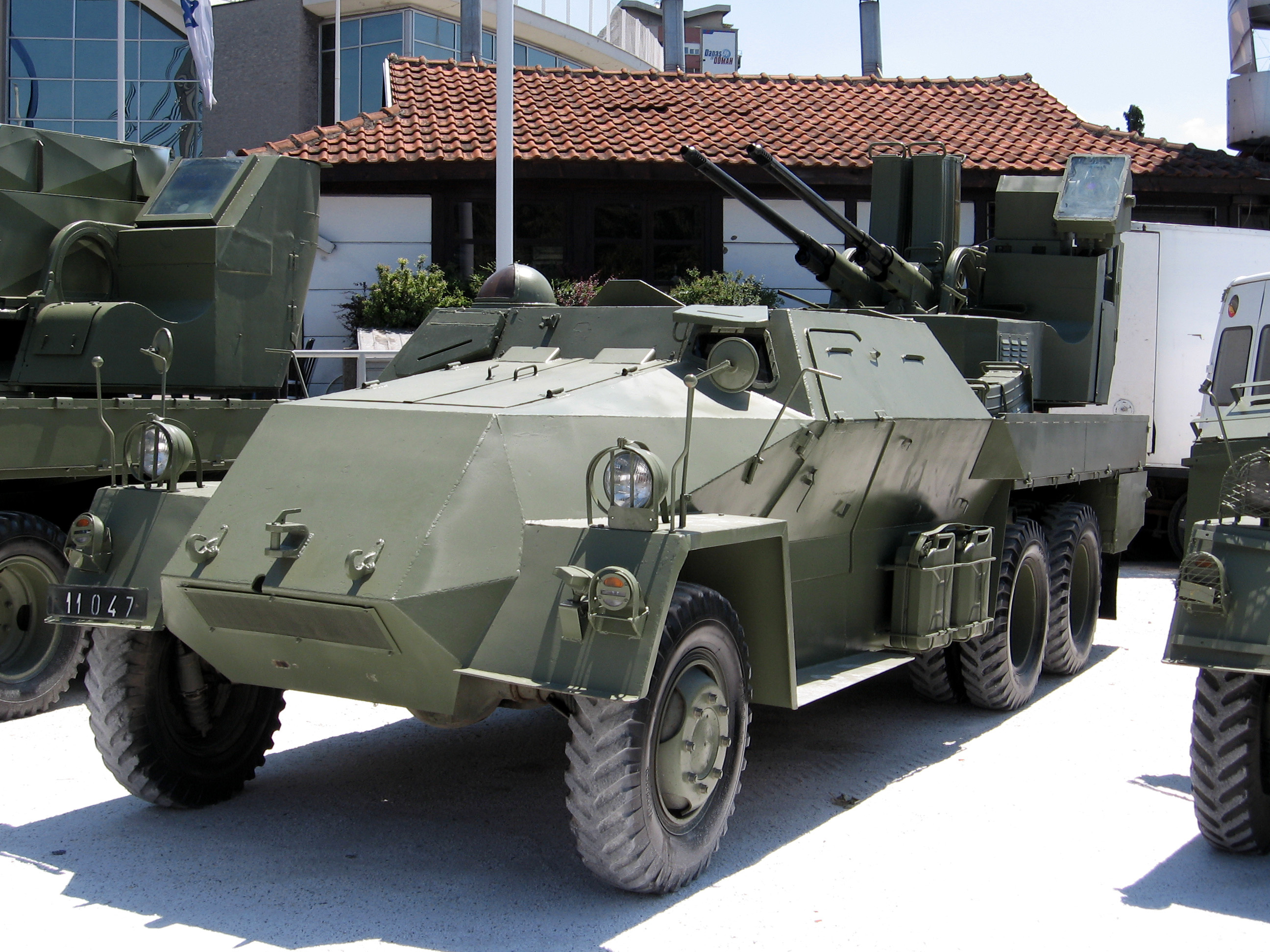
- M53/59 Praga self-propelled anti-aircraft gun of the Serbian Army
- Type: Self-propelled anti-aircraft gun
- Place of origin: Czechoslovakia

Service history
- In service: 1959−1992 (Czechoslovakia)
- Used by: See operators
- Wars: Gulf War; Yugoslav Wars; Second Congo War

Production history
- Produced: 1959–1978
- No. built: 900+ (Note: Delivered to the Czechoslovak Army. According to SIPRI, Yugoslavia received a total of 789 vehicles between 1969 and 1976, while Libya received 110 between 1970 and 1973.)

Specifications
- Mass: 10,300 kg (22,700 lb)
- Length: 6.92 m (22.7 ft)
- Width: 2.35 m (7 ft 9 in)
- Height: 2.95 m (9 ft 8 in) (Note: Including magazines. 2.585 m (8 ft 6 in) without magazines. (O'Halloran & Foss 2002, p. 52))
- Crew: 4 (driver, commander and two gun operators)
- Shell: Armour-piercing incendiary (API); High-explosive incendiary (HEI)
- Caliber: 30 mm (1.2 in)
- Barrels: 2
- Action: Gas-operated
- Elevation: -10° – +85°
- Traverse: 360°
- Rate of fire: 450−500 rpm per barrel (cyclic); 150 rpm per barrel (practical)
- Effective firing range: 3,000 m (9,800 ft)
- Maximum firing range: 9,700 m (31,800 ft) (horizontal); 6,300 m (20,700 ft) (vertical)
- Feed system: 50-round box magazines
- Armor: Steel, 10 mm (0.39 in) max (estimated)
- Main armament: 30 mm twin AA autocannon (600−900 rounds)
- Engine: Tatra T912-2 6-cylinder air-cooled diesel 110 hp (82 kW) at 2,200 rpm
- Power/weight: 11.57 hp/t (8.63 kW/t)
- Transmission: Manual with 4 forward and 2 reverse gears
- Fuel capacity: 120 L (26 imp gal; 32 US gal)
- Operational range: 500 km (310 mi)
- Maximum speed: 60 km/h (37 mph)

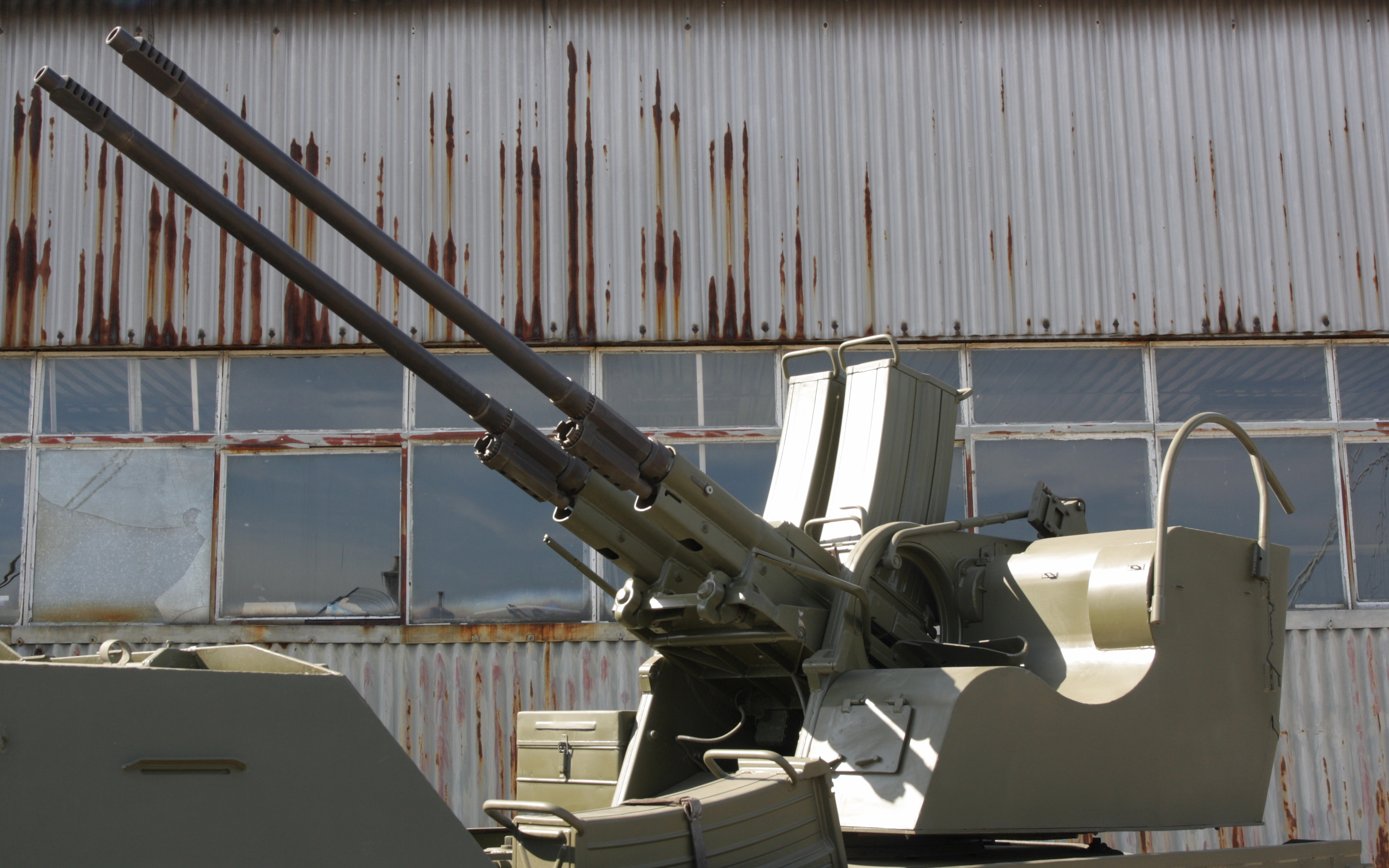
Detail of 30 mm twin AA gun, vz.53/59

The M53/59 Praga is a Czechoslovak self-propelled anti-aircraft gun developed in the late 1950s. It consists of an armoured version of the Praga V3S six-wheel drive truck chassis, armed with a modified version of the M53 twin 30 mm (1.2 in) anti-aircraft gun mounted on the rear, which can be removed and used to provide ground support.

In Czechoslovakia, it was known as Praga PLDvK vz. 53/59 (PLDvK Model 53/59). PLDvK stands for Protiletadlový dvojkanón, or "twin anti-aircraft cannon". Vehicles for the export market were sold under the designation Praga M53/59 "Ještěrka" ("Lizard").

== Description ==
The M53/59 has an all-welded steel armoured hull with a front engine, crew compartment at the centre and rear mounted guns. The armour is sloped to provide protection against small arms and shrapnel without increasing weight.

Armoured covers with vision slits which can be lowered in combat to provide additional protection to the driver and commander, while the two loaders seated on the back of the crew compartment have two vision slits behind the side doors. The commander also has a hemispherical plexiglass cupola for observation.

The twin guns have an elevation of +85°, and a depression of −10°, except over the crew compartment where the depression is limited to +2° and the commander's cupola where there is none. A steel plate on the back of the crew compartment prevents the gun barrels from hitting the roof. The turret can fully traverse 360° degrees and the traverse, elevation, and depression hydraulic systems can be manually controlled in case of emergency. The gunner is seated on the left side of the turret under the armoured cabin protection.

The 30 mm twin autocannons are gas-operated, with a maximum rate of fire of 450 to 500 rounds per barrel/minute and a practical rate of fire of 150 rounds per barrel/minute. Each gun has a 50-round magazine which are fed with 10-round clips. Each vehicle typically carries around 600 to 800 rounds. Fully loaded magazines are carried in the back of the crew compartment fastened to the floor by quick-release catches, while three spare magazines are carried on either side of the platform. Originally the guns were fitted with muzzle brakes, but they were later observed with conical flash hiders instead. The barrels can be quickly changed when overheated, and spare barrels were provided to the crews as part of the basic equipment.

Maximum horizontal range is 9.7 km (6 mi), maximum vertical range is 6.3 km (4 mi), and effective anti-aircraft range is 3 km (2 mi). The M53 guns can fire armor-piercing incendiary rounds capable of penetrating 55 mm (2.2 in) of RHA at a 0° angle at a range of 500 m (550 yd) and high-explosive incendiary rounds.

Stowed under the vehicle are two ramps and a winch which the crew can use to dismount the gun mount for deploying the system in the ground support role (stabilized by four jacks), and mount it back on to the vehicle.

The system lacks radar guidance, and night vision equipment, which makes it only effective during the day under good weather conditions. Other drawbacks of the M53/59 are the lack of a NBC protection system, no amphibious capabilities, and no central tire pressure regulation system. It also suffers from poor cross-country mobility, preventing effective coordination with tracked vehicles. Despite these drawbacks, the Czechoslovak Army used the M53/59 in place of the Soviet ZSU-57-2.

== Variants ==
=== Czechoslovakia ===
- M53/59 Praga − Based on the Praga V3S 6×6 truck with an armoured cab. Mass-produced between 1959 and 1978.
- M53/70 − Export-only variant, with an improved fire-control system. An unknown number of vehicles was sold to Iraq and used during the Gulf War.

=== Serbia ===
- Praga VS35 M19 − A proposed upgrade by Srboauto in 2019 to meet the requirements of the Serbian Armed Forces. Improvements included a new four-door cab fully armoured to the NATO STANAG 4569 Level 2 standard, fitted with bullet/splinter proof windows on the front and sides and an Eberspächer 8 kW (11 hp) heater installed in the crew compartment.

== Combat history ==
=== Iraq ===
In 1991, prior to the start of the Gulf War, it was estimated that Iraq had around 9,000 to 10,000 AA guns in service, including the M53/59 and M53/70.

=== Yugoslavia ===
The M53/59 saw use during the Yugoslav wars, by the Yugoslav Army, Army of the Republic of Bosnia and Herzegovina, Croatian Defence Council, Army of Republika Srpska, Serbian Army of Krajina, Slovenian and Croatian forces as well, mainly in the ground fire support role.

=== Democratic Republic of Congo ===
At least one M53/59 was seen in 2012 in the city of Goma. While its exact origin is unknown (possibly from Serbia, Slovakia, or Libya), it is known that the newly reformed DRC Army was armed with weapons left by the former Zairean Army and whatever could be purchased abroad.

== Operators ==
=== Current ===
- Democratic Republic of Congo
- Serbia – 36 in active service and 100 in reserve.

=== Former ===
- Bosnia and Herzegovina − 100 in 2002.
- Croatia
- Czech Republic − Retired from service on 31 December 2003.
- Czechoslovakia − Passed on to successor states.
- Herzeg-Bosnia
- Iraq − M53/59 and M53/70 used in the Gulf War, none remained in service by 2002.
- Libya − 100+ in 2002.
- Republika Srpska
- Serbia and Montenegro
- Serbian Krajina
- Slovakia
- Slovenia − 9 in 2002.
- Yugoslavia − Passed on to successor states.

== See also ==
- Praga (vehicle works)

== Bibliography ==
- Bacevich, Andrew J.; Cohen, Eliot A., eds. (2002). War Over Kosovo: Politics and Strategy in a Global Age. Columbia University Press. ISBN 978-0-231-50052-4.
- Bosnia Country Handbook: Peace Implementation Force (IFOR). Department of Defense. 1995.
- Cooper, Tom (2013). Great Lakes Conflagration: Second Congo War, 1998−2003 (PDF). Helion and Company. ISBN 978-1-909384-66-8.
- Cullen, Tony; Foss, Christopher F, eds. (1992). Jane's Land-based Air Defence 1992−93 (PDF) (5th ed.). Jane's Information Group. ISBN 978-0-7106-0979-3.
- International Institute for Strategic Studies (1995). The Military Balance 1995−1996. Oxford University Press. ISBN 978-0-19-828055-2.
- National Training Center (1991). The Iraqi Army: Organization and Tactics. Paladin Press. ISBN 978-0-87364-632-1.
- O'Halloran, James C; Foss, Christopher F, eds. (2002). Jane's Land-Based Air Defense 2002−2003 (15th ed.). Janes Information Group. ISBN 978-0-7106-2437-6.
- Trewhitt, Philip (1999). Armored Fighting Vehicles: 300 of the world's greatest military vehicles. New York, NY: Barnes & Noble Books. ISBN 978-0-7607-1260-3.
