= Tatra 810 =

Czech truck family

Tatra T 810
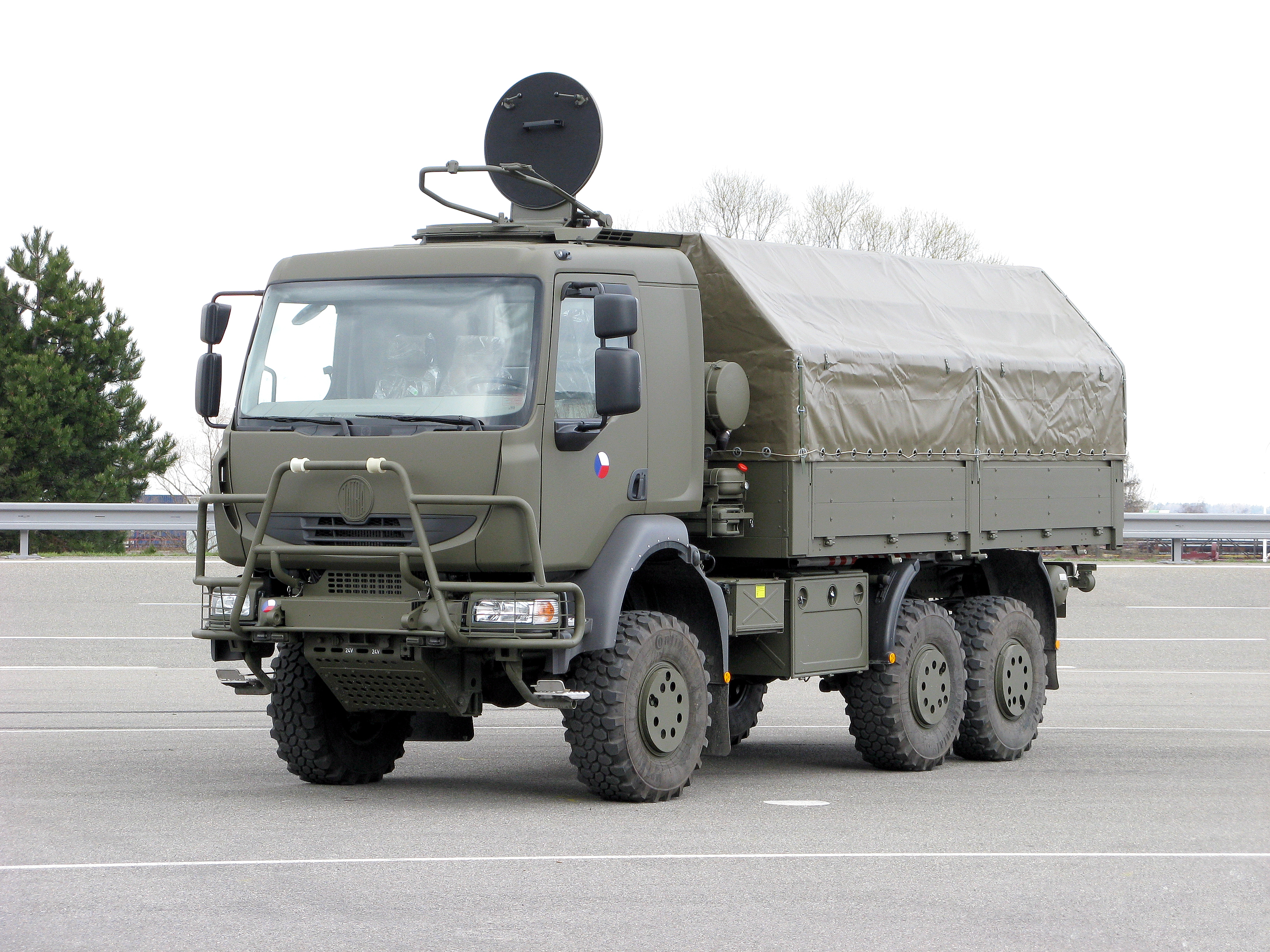

Overview
- Manufacturer: Tatra
- Production: 2008-present
- Assembly: Kopřivnice, Moravia, Czech Republic

Body and chassis
- Class: Medium truck
- Body style: COE

Powertrain
- Engine: Diesel: Renault DXi7 240 EC01 (Euro 3); Renault Dxi 7 (Euro 5)
- Transmission: ZF 6 manual 6 speed + auxiliary gearbox Steyr VG750/270

Dimensions
- Wheelbase: 3,150 mm (124.0 in) + 1,200 mm (47.2 in); 3,540 mm (139.4 in) + 1,200 mm (47.2 in)
- Length: 7,420 mm (292.1 in)
- Width: 2,550 mm (100.4 in)
- Height: 3,065 mm (120.7 in)
- Curb weight: 7,000 kg (15,000 lb) empty 15,500 kg (34,200 lb) loaded

Chronology
- Predecessor: Praga V3S

Renault DXi7

Overview
- Manufacturer: Renault

Layout
- Configuration: Straight six
- Displacement: 7,145 cc
- Cylinder bore: 108 mm (4.3 in)
- Piston stroke: 130 mm (5.1 in)
- Compression ratio: 18:1

Combustion
- Fuel type: Diesel fuel
- Cooling system: Water cooled

Output
- Power output: 177 kW (237 hp) @ 2000 rpm
- Torque output: 920 N⋅m (679 ft⋅lbf) @ 1300 rpm

Dimensions
- Dry weight: 645 kg (1,422 lb)

The Tatra T 810 (Tactic) is a medium truck made by Czech company Tatra; it replaced the popular Praga V3S which was introduced in the 1950s and served in the Army of the Czech Republic until 2008. Unlike other Tatra trucks, it does not use classic Tatra air-cooled engine and the traditional Tatra conception of backbone chassis and swinging half-axles, but the customary truck architecture with conventional frame. It is mainly intended for difficult terrain conditions. The civilian version T 810-C was introduced in 2010. In 2025, a modernized version of the 810 M was introduced.

== History ==
In early 1990s the Czech Army was aiming to replace its aging fleet of medium trucks, which was represented by the Praga V3S model introduced into production as early as in 1953. The selection procedure was won the Roudnické slévárny a strojírny (Foundries And Machine-Works of Roudnice) with its ROSS R210 project. The R210 was outsourcing many components from Renault. Since 1996 the company delivered 15 vehicles for the testing purposes, after which the delivery of serial vehicles was supposed to start, however in 1998 the Czech Army canceled the contract. The company has invested a lot into the development of the truck and subsequently it bankrupted.

In 2002 the Tatra company bought the documentation and rights to the R210 truck in order to enter the market of medium trucks (from 3,5 tons to 12 tons), as all the models the company offered were in the class of heavy trucks. It intended to modernize the original project, and it also hoped that the Czech Army will finally undertake the replacement of its fleet of 4000 Praga V3s (while Tatra was supplying the Army with heavy trucks since World War I). Tatra created alliance with other companies to work on the project together; for example the Praga was supposed to deliver gear boxes and portal axle. Other components were to be delivered by Renault (engine, cab).

In 2005 the Czech government approved acquisition of the T810 trucks in August 2005, while deliveries were scheduled to start in April 2008.

The civilian version T 810-C was introduced in 2010, with Tatra claiming it is the only truck with maximum weight of 15,5 tons that has three driven axles, which together with its portal architecture is supposed to give it advantage over the competition in terrain.

In 2017, Tatra 810 4×4 has created the world record, the vehicle crossed the highest artificially created obstacle by the truck, artificial barrier called Brut Monster is one of the most extreme artificial barriers of its kind. Tatra has managed to climb and descent 146%, respectively to surpass inclination of 55°, of 7.5-meter-high obstacle.

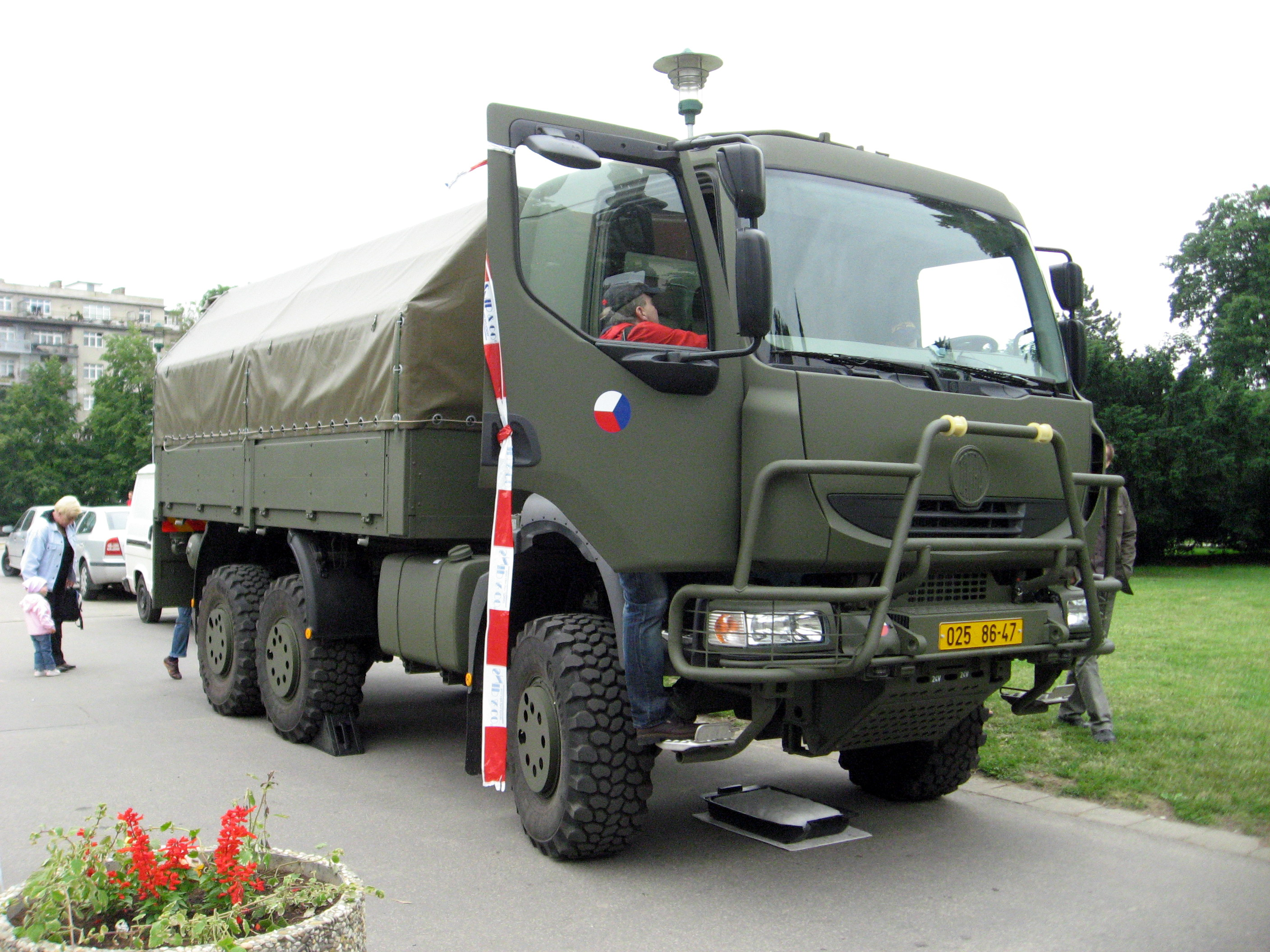
Tatra 810 of the Czech Army

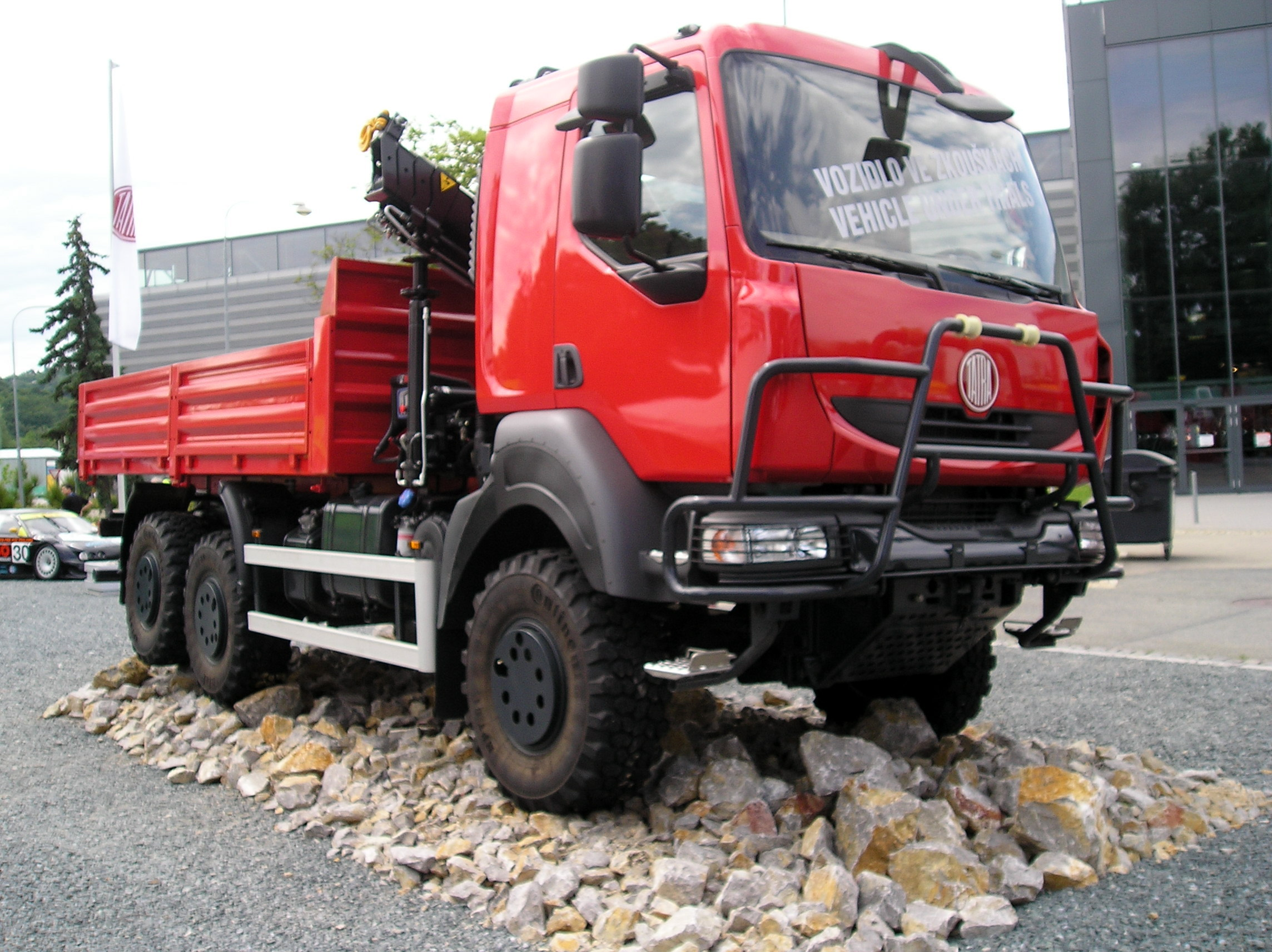
Civilian version Tatra 810-C

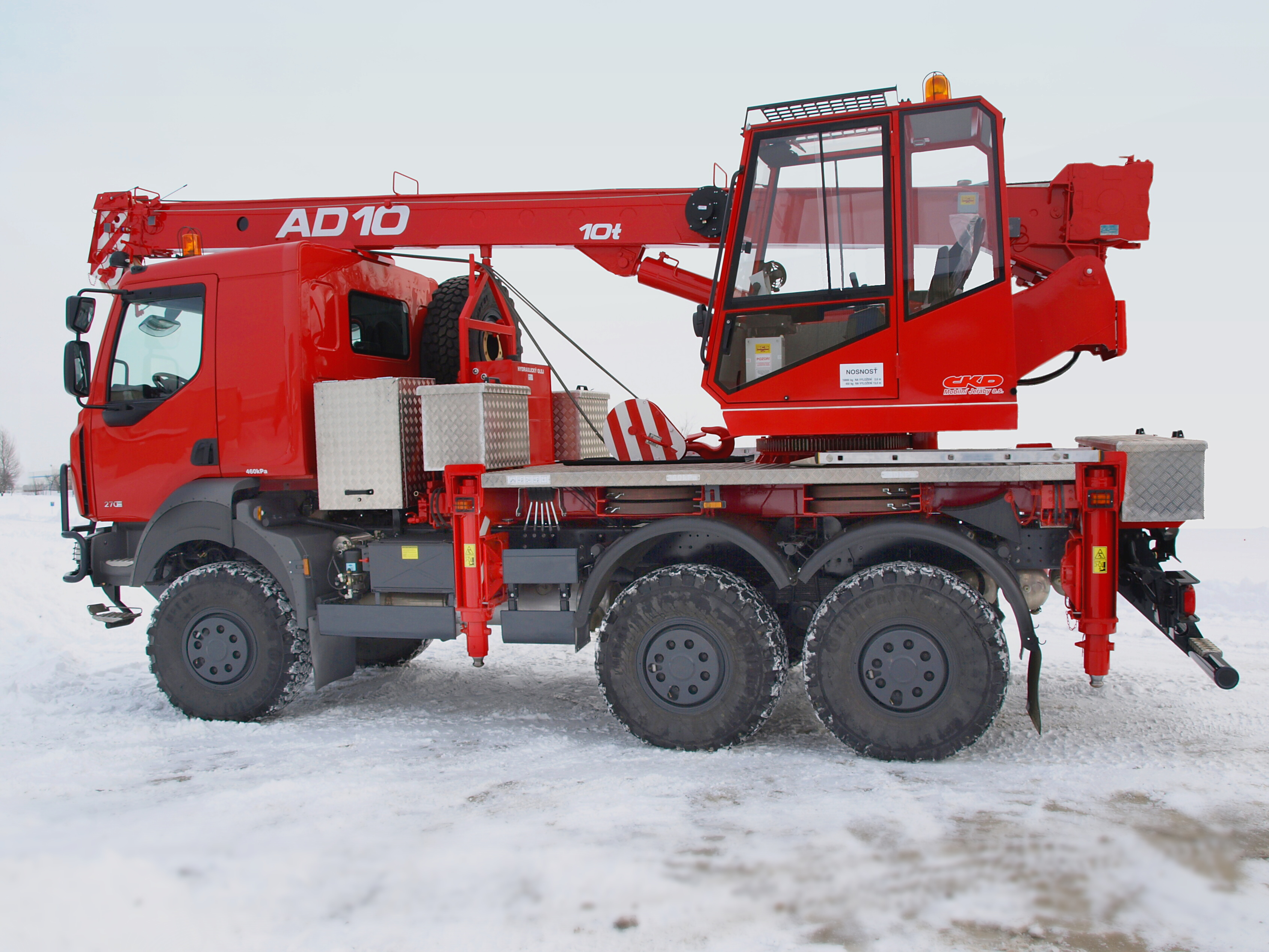
Tatra 810-C mobile crane

== Operators ==
- Army of the Czech Republic
- Armed Forces of Saudi Arabia
- (United Arab Emirates) Armed Forces of UAE
- Civilian users (T 810-C)
