= Praga V3S =

Czechoslovak multi-purpose truck

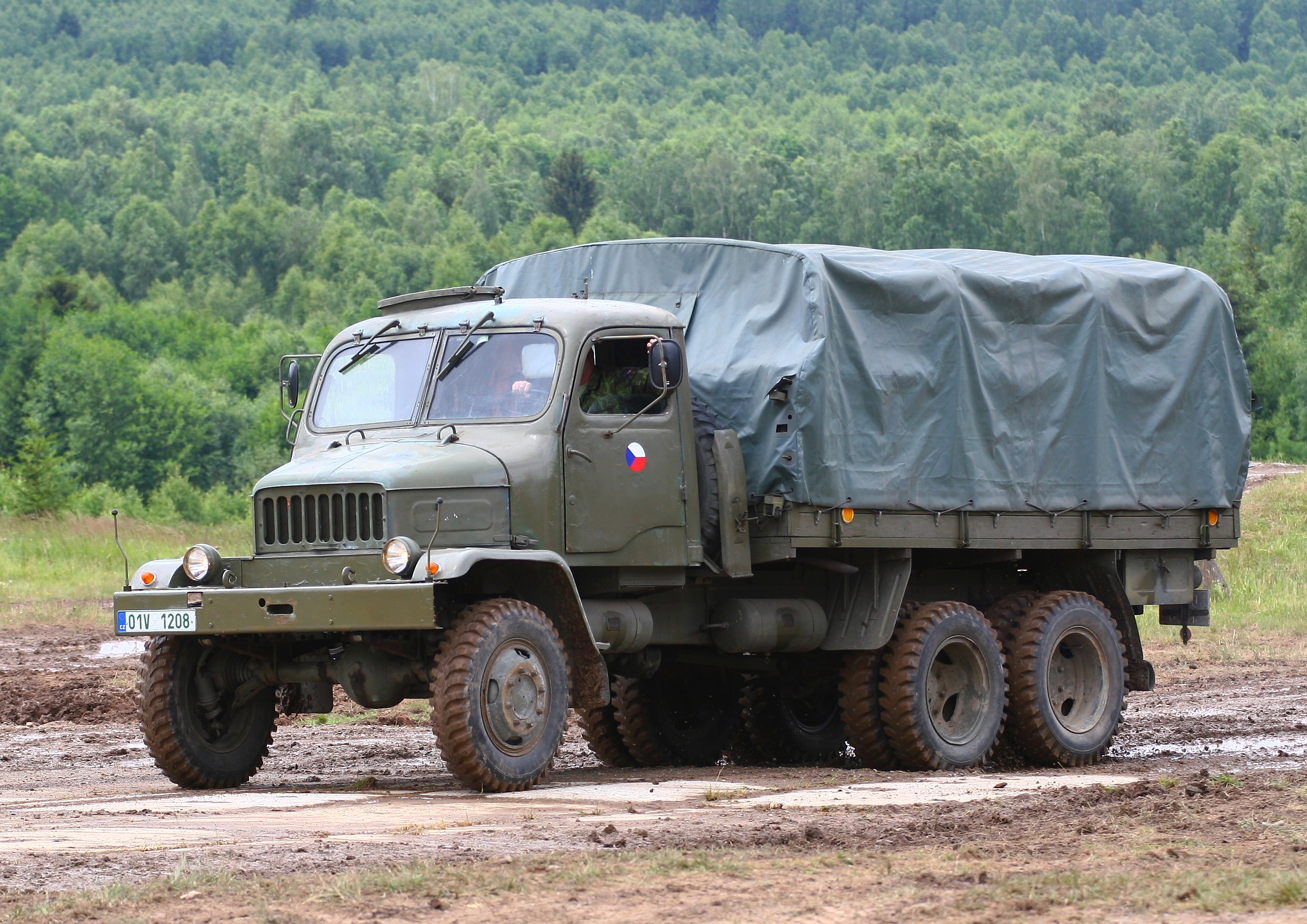
- Praga V3S of Czech Army

Overview
- Manufacturer: Praga
- Production: 1953–1964 (Praga); 1964–1988 (Avia); 1986–1990 (BAZ)

Body and chassis
- Layout: 6×6

Powertrain
- Engine: 7.4L Tatra 912-1 I6 diesel
- Transmission: 4-step

Dimensions
- Length: 6.91 m (272 in)
- Width: 2.31 m (91 in)
- Height: 2.92 m (115 in)
- Curb weight: 5,470–8,650 kg (12,059–19,070 lb)

The Praga V3S (Vojenský třítunový speciál/ Military 3ton Special) is an all-terrain multi-purpose truck, produced between 1953 and 1990 in Czechoslovakia. It was designed for the armed forces and was also exported to 72 countries. Praga produced the truck until 1964, then the Avia company until around 1986, after which the Bratislava company BAZ rolled out these vehicles until 1990. Around 130,000 units were manufactured. The truck was among the best off-road cargo vehicles of its time and the Czechoslovak Army used it for more than half a century. It was the longest produced Czechoslovak truck and it still serves in Czech Army for more than 70 years, despite being slowly replaced by Tatra 810 and Tatra 815.

== Development ==
For the development till prototype stage of the truck, designers were given only four months. They were inspired mainly by the American Studebaker US6 and Russian ZiL. Due to the design incorporating portal axles (axles positioned high above the wheels axis), the V3S has a high ground clearance, this structure provides great terrain passability, but on the other hand limits the maximum speed to 60 km/h (37 mph). The V3S was a durable, popular and extremely adaptable truck built in various versions and widely exported, therefore it is not difficult to see V3S based vehicles still hard at work nowadays.

== Description ==
The engine is an air-cooled diesel six-cylinder "Tatra 912-1" (modified engine from Tatra 111), with a capacity of 7412 cm³, direct fuel injection and overhead valves. It is relatively noisy, but works reliably even in extreme conditions. Climbing ability is up to 75% (without tow). Ten wheels (rear are four dual, front are two) help the truck not to bog down in soft soil, therefore it does not experience any problems in forests or in the field. Consumption is 30 liters of diesel per 100 km, the fuel tank has a capacity of 120 liters. The truck is able to get over 40 cm high perpendicular obstacles, and wading depth is 80 cm. There are two batteries (12 V, 125 Ah), they are connected in parallel during driving, but in serial for engine startups. The payload of the truck is 5 tons on paved surfaces and 3 tons on rough terrain.

== Users ==
- Algeria
- Czech Republic
- Slovakia
- Syria

=== Former users ===
- Austria
- Czechoslovakia

== Images ==
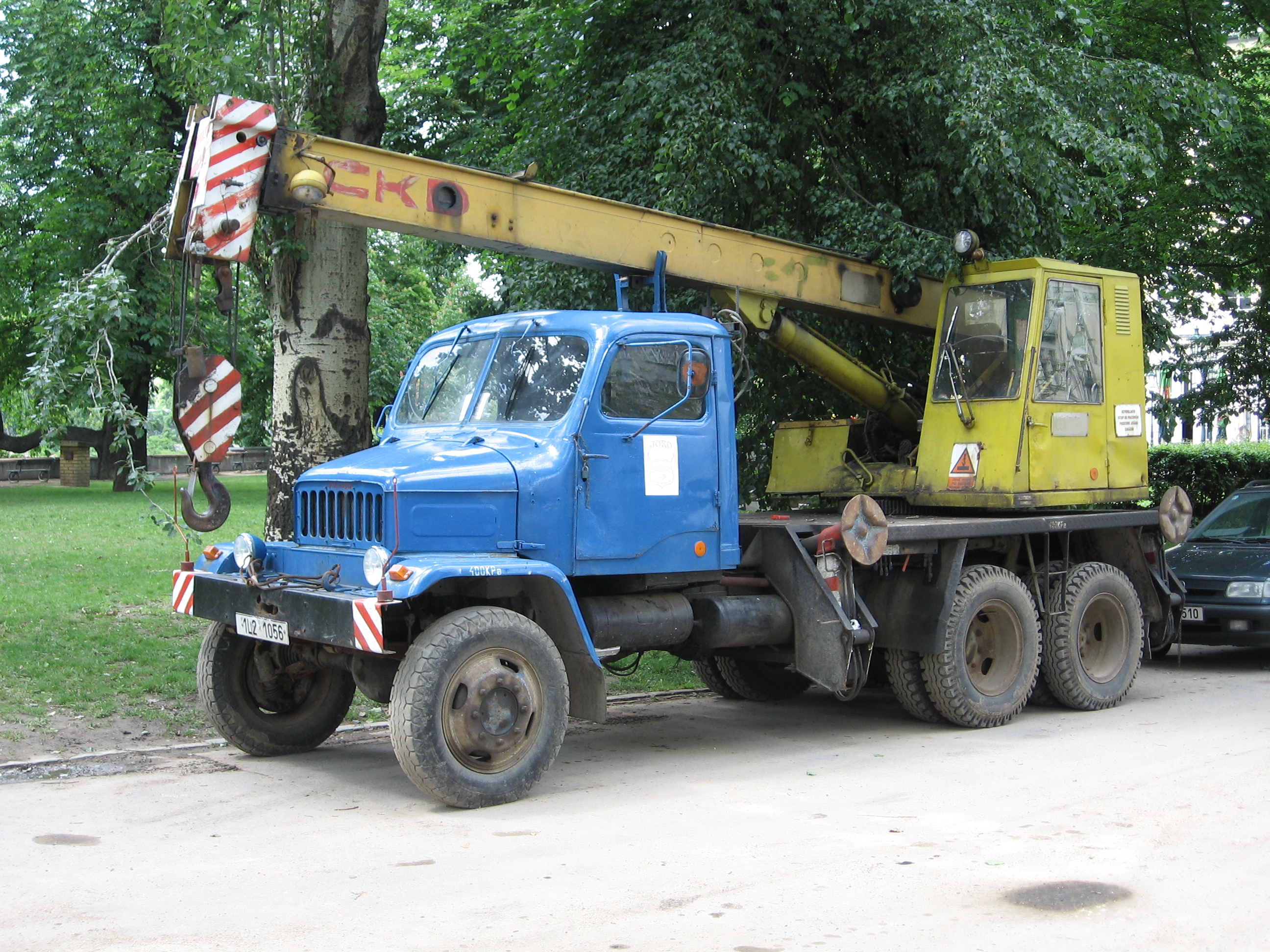
Praga V3S truck crane

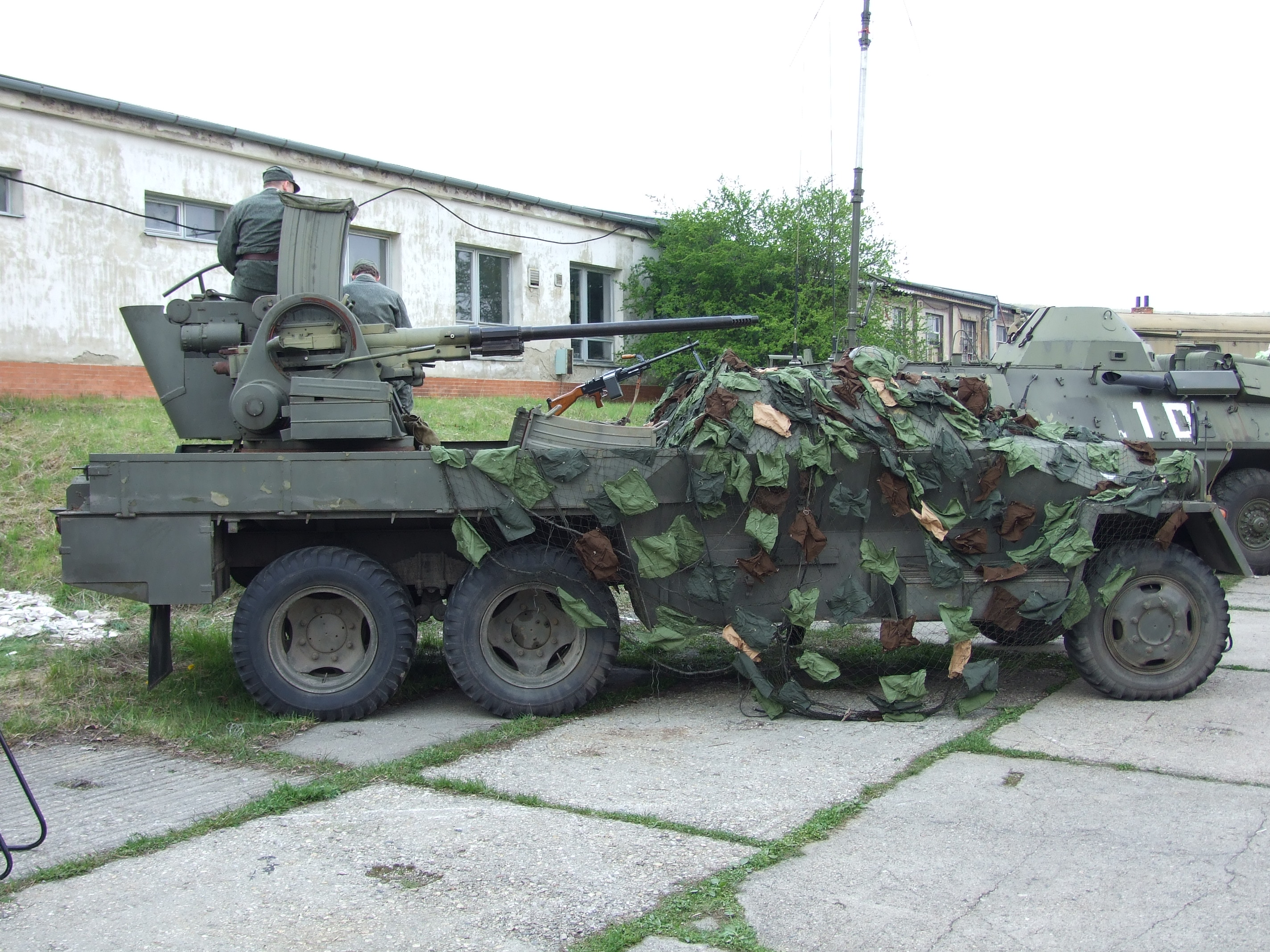
30mm twin self-propelled AA gun М53/59 on Praga V3S chassis

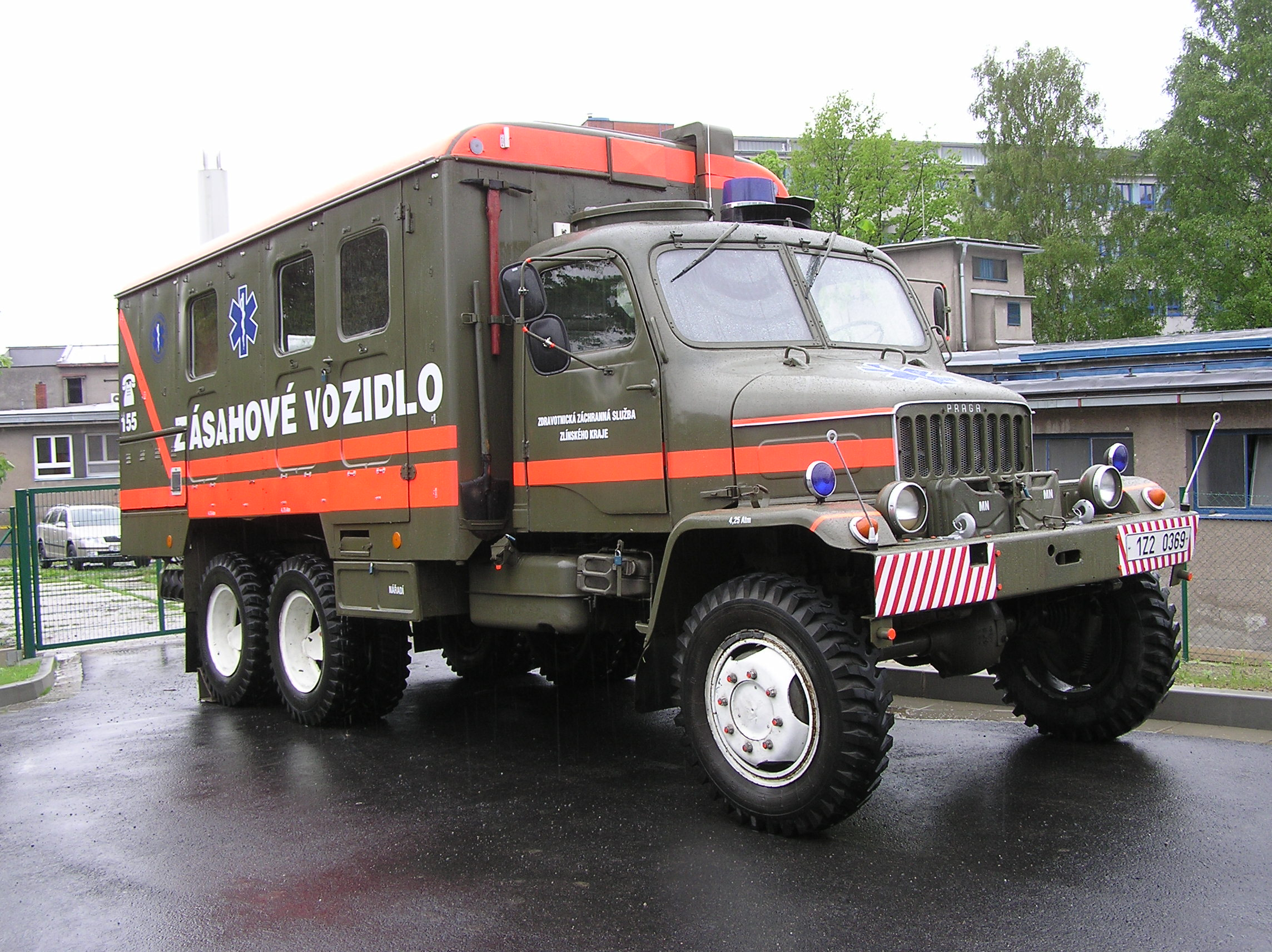
Praga V3S with X-ray medical examination bay

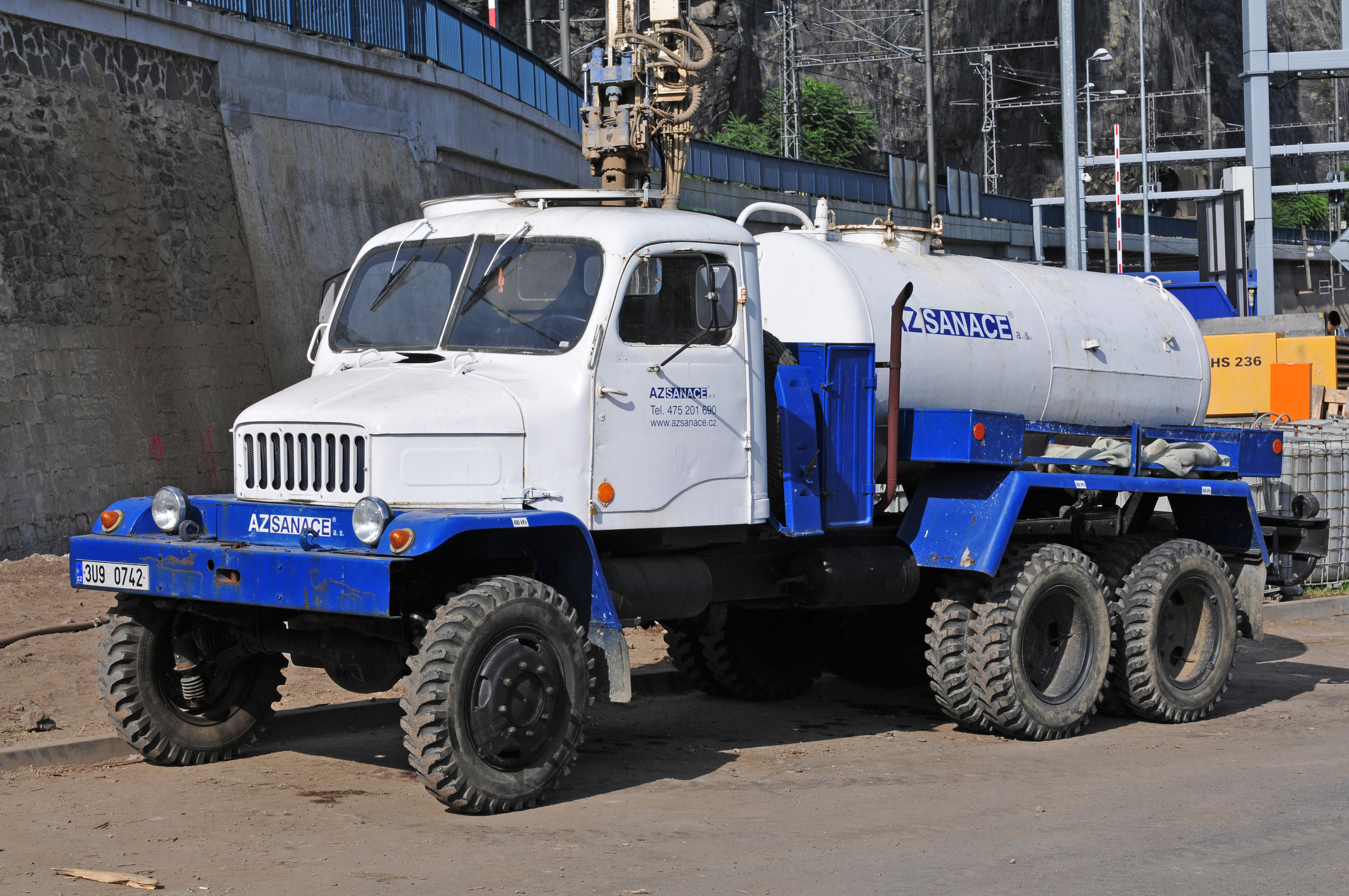
Praga V3S tanker

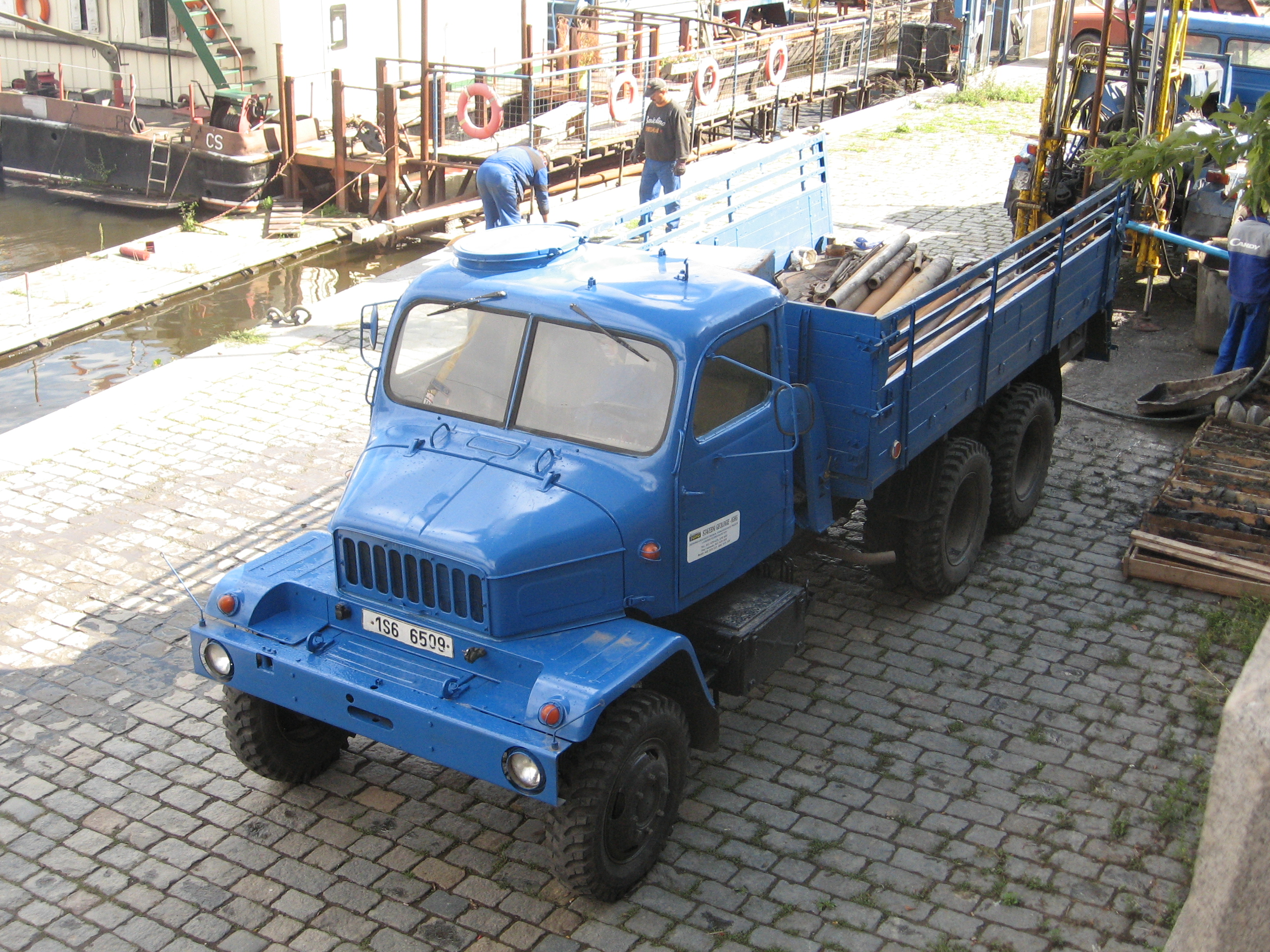
Praga V3S M2

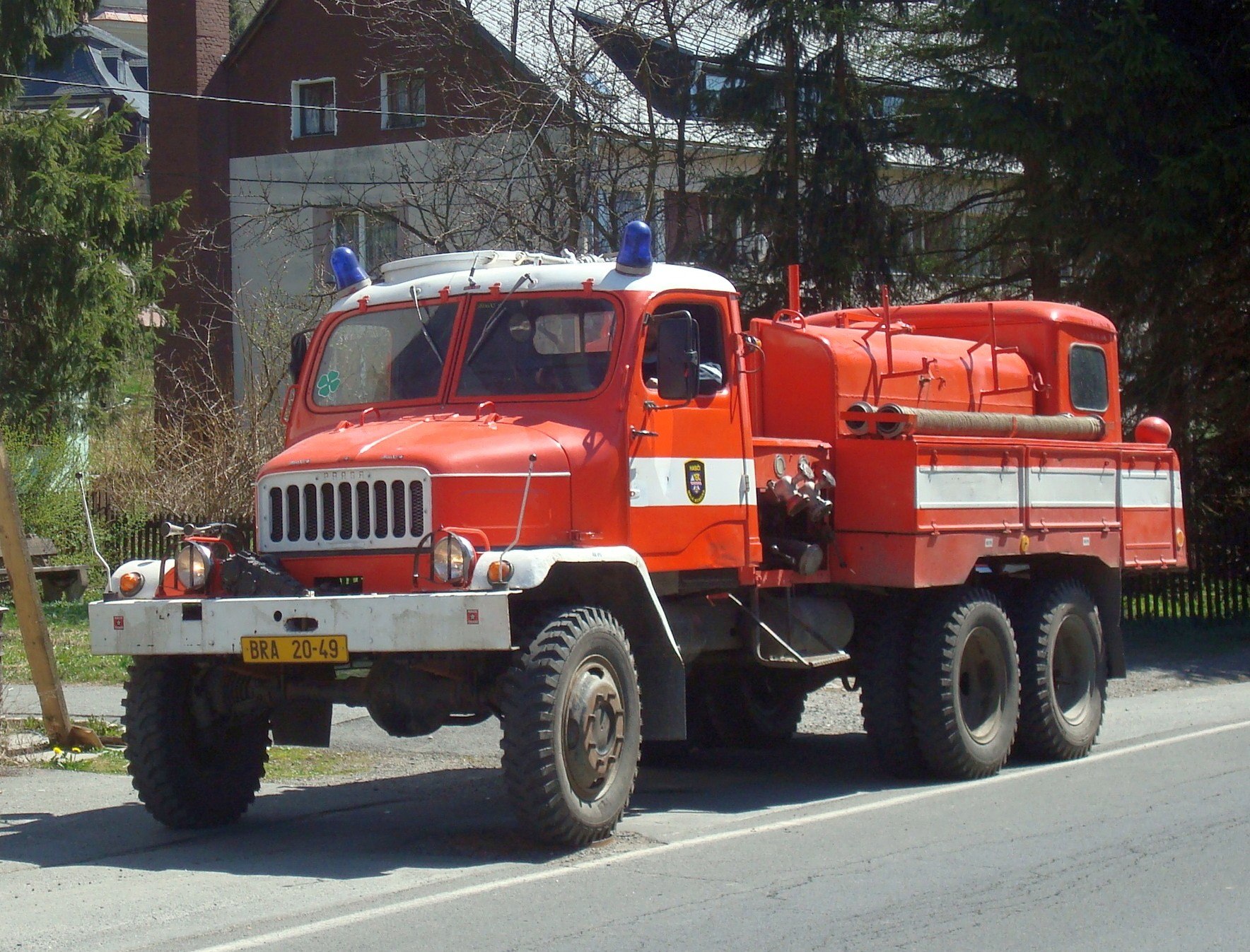
Praga V3S fire engine

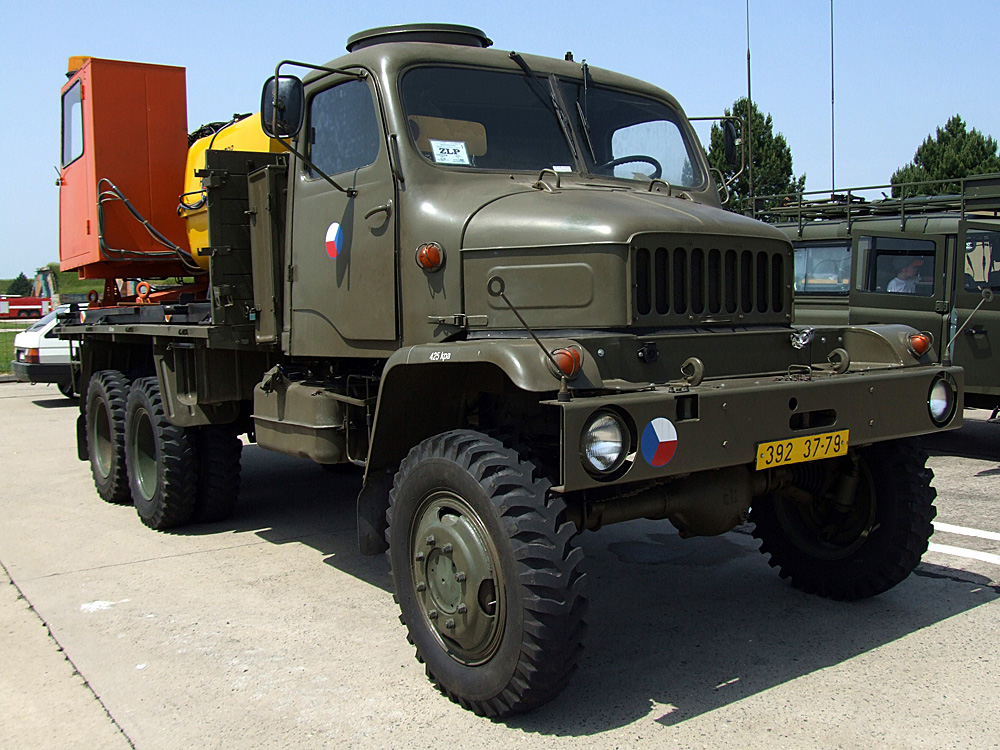
Deicing vehicle Oz-88 on Praga V3S chassis

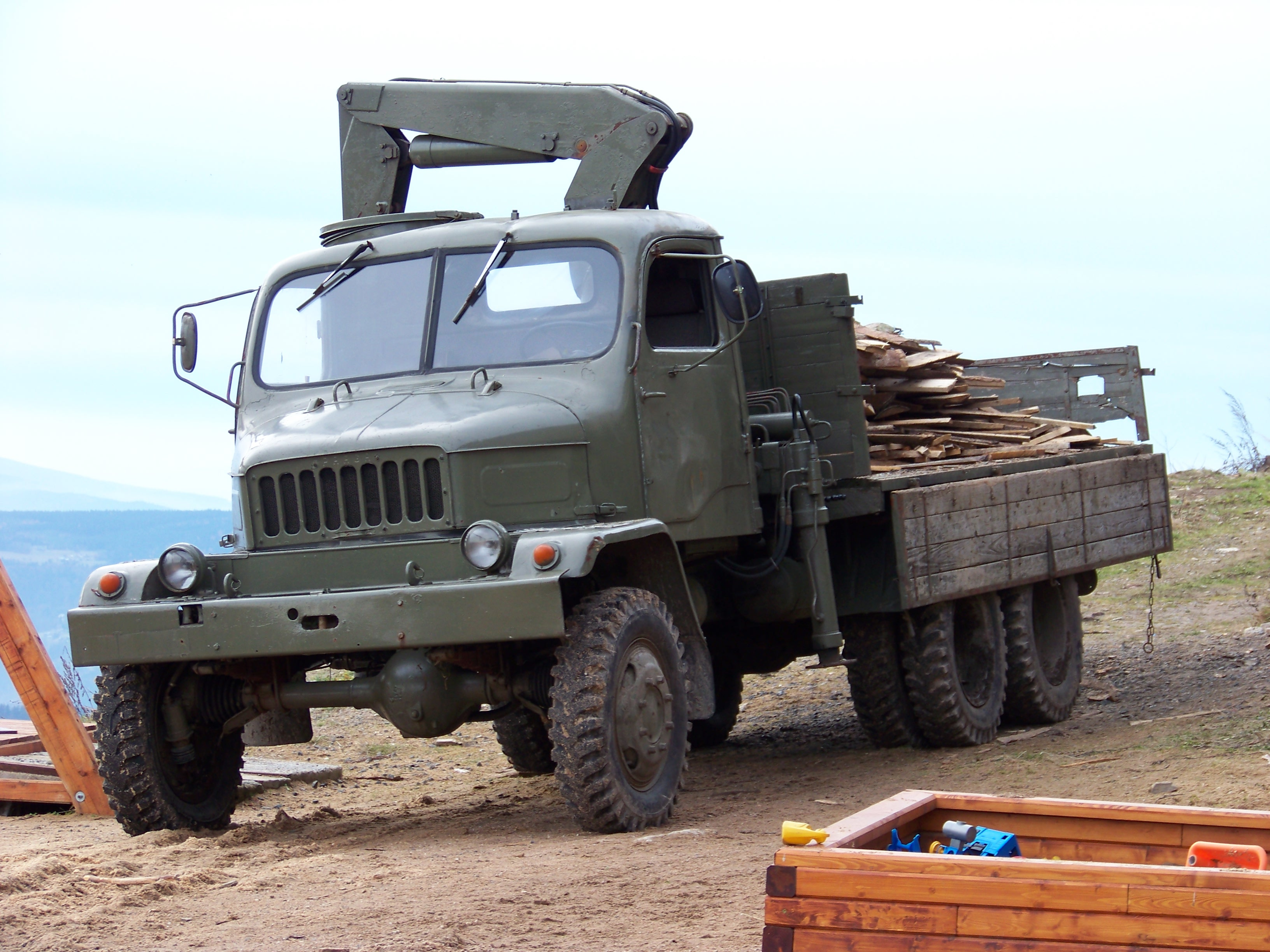
Praga V3S open truck
