= S. Darius and S. Girėnas Airport =

S. Darius and S. Girėnas Airport S. Dariaus ir S. Girėno aerodromas
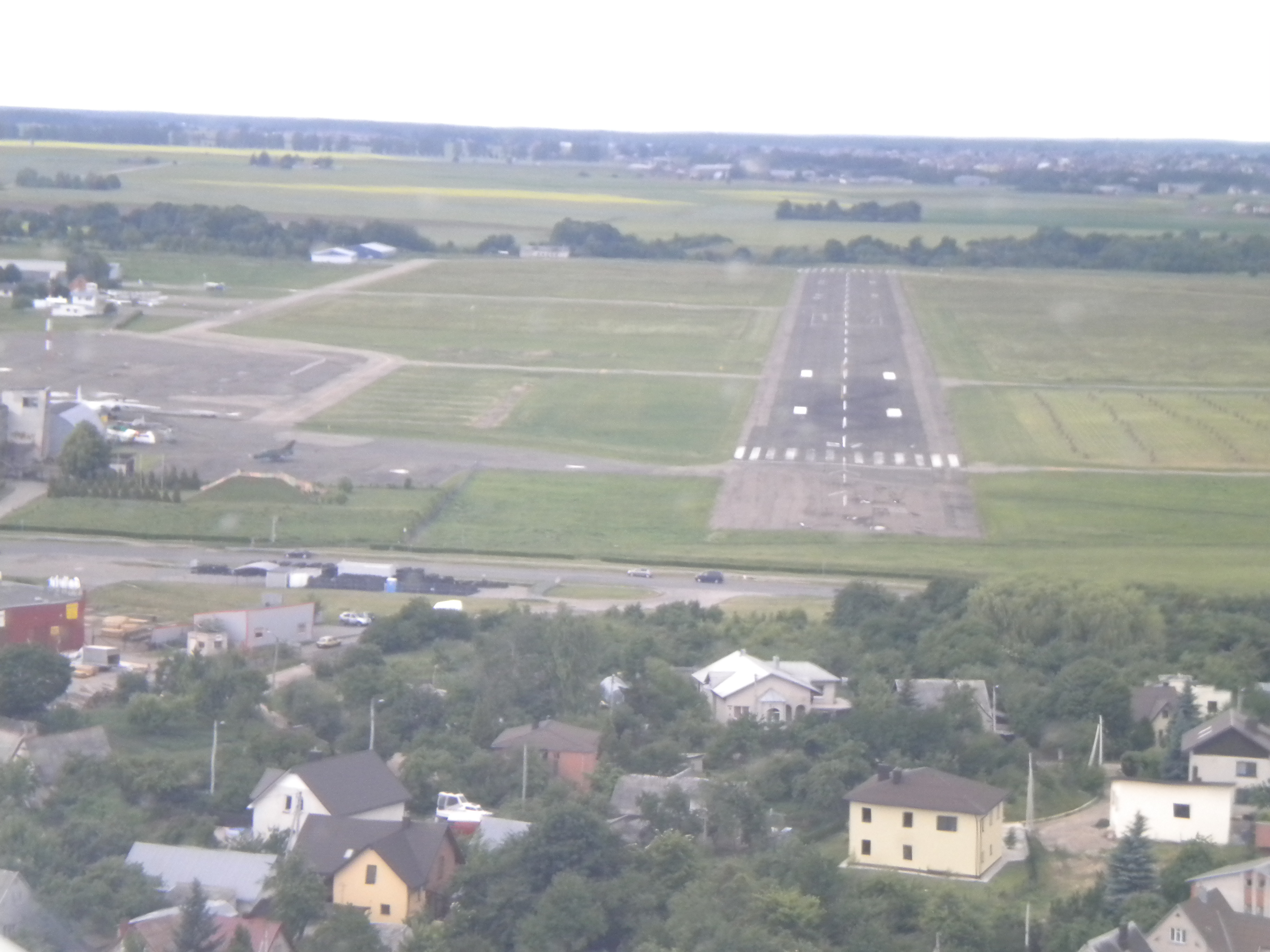
- IATA: QXA; ICAO: EYKS

Summary
- Airport type: Public
- Serves: Kaunas, Lithuania
- Location: Aleksotas
- Built: 1915
- Elevation AMSL: 246 ft (75 m)
- Coordinates: 54°52′48″N 023°52′54″E
- Interactive map of S. Darius and S. Girėnas Airport

Runways
Direction	Length		Surface
Direction	m	ft	Surface
09R/27L	1,130	3,707	Asphalt

S. Darius and S. Girėnas Airport (S. Dariaus ir S. Girėno aerodromas) (ICAO: EYKS), also known as Aleksotas Airport (Aleksoto aerodromas), is a small airport located in Aleksotas district of Kaunas, Lithuania, about 3 kilometres south-west from city centre. On 6 May 1993, the airport was named after the Lithuanian pilots Steponas Darius and Stasys Girėnas, who perished in a crash near the end of an attempted non-stop flight from New York to Lithuania in 1933.

== Military use ==
S. Darius and S. Girėnas Airport was conceived as a military airport, established by the German Army in 1915, after it captured Kaunas Fortress. Used continuously since then, it is the oldest functioning airport in Lithuania, making it also one of the oldest airports in Europe. The airport area underwent major upgrades in 1926 (air force hangars), 1931, 1942 (800 m. concrete runway with taxiways, repair hangars built), 1950s (concrete runway extension to 1330 m.) and 1970s (passenger terminal, navigation equipment).

During the Interwar period, when Kaunas was Lithuania's capital, Aleksotas Airport was used as the primary base of the Lithuanian Air Force. It also served as a test ground for locally built airplanes, like Dobi I, Dobi II, Dobi III by Jurgis Dobkevičius, Anbo I, Anbo II, Anbo III, Anbo IV and Anbo 41, Anbo V, Anbo VI, and ANBO VIII by Antanas Gustaitis and gliders.

The airport suffered heavily during World War II. On 22 June 1941, Luftwaffe on the ground destroyed most of the Red Army aircraft, stationed at Aleksotas Airfield. Airport infrastructure suffered major damage in July 1944 during the battle for Kaunas. Retreating Wehrmacht destroyed most of the hangars, and heavily damaged runway and taxiways.

From 1940–1941 and 1944–1991 it was used as a Soviet airbase; from 1941–1944 as a German Luftwaffe base; and from 1991–1993 as a Russian base. For the Soviets and Russians, military Mil Mi-2, Mil Mi-6 and Mil Mi-8 helicopters were stationed there prior to withdrawal in August 1993.

On 20 May 2016, Lithuanian Air Force moved its Second Search and Rescue post (three helicopter landing areas, one helicopter on constant duty) from Freda Airfield (Kaunas Aviation Plant airfield, EYKG) to Aleksotas Airport.

== Civil air communication ==
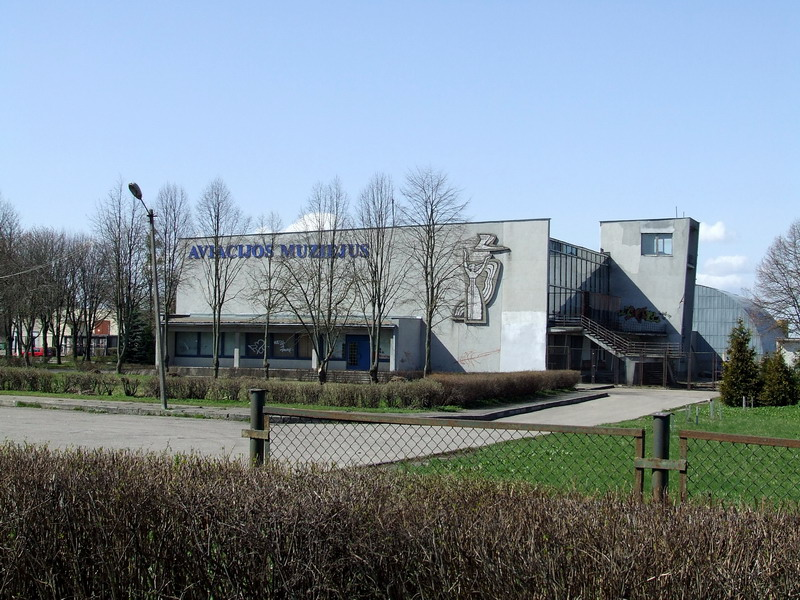
Passenger terminal of old Kaunas airport (S. Darius and S. Girėnas Airport), now hosting Lithuanian Aviation Museum

The civil air communication was started by the German airlines in 1921. Initially the mail and passenger line Königsberg-Kaunas was served by Lloyd Luftdienst, Danziger Luftdienst, Danziger Luftpost. German-Soviet airline Deruluft airline opened regular service Königsberg-Kaunas-Smolensk-Moscow in May 1922. This was later expanded to the route Berlin-Danzig-Königsberg-Kaunas-Smolensk-Moscow. In 1923-1925, Latvian airline Latvijas Gaisa Satiksmes AS operated Königsberg-Kaunas-Riga-Tallinn-Helsinki route, with the latter being closed in 1925 due to low profitability and withdrawal of Latvian government subsidies. In 1938 - 1939, Polish airline LOT operated flights on the route Warsaw-Kaunas-Riga. For Autumn season, an extension to Helsinki was planned; however, it did not happen due to the outbreak of World War II.

In 1931, the first passenger terminal was built; it was destroyed during World War II. A new Terminal was built in the 1970s..

The airport runway underwent a major reconstruction in 2018.

Aleksotas Airport was the base of the first Lithuanian airline; the carrier "Lietuvos oro linijos" was founded in 1938, when the Lithuanian government ordered two British-built twin engine six-seat planes Percival Q 6 Petrel. The planes were registered LY-SOA and LY-SOB and, commemorating the national trans-Atlantic heroes, were respectively named "Steponas Darius" and "Stasys Girėnas". The first Lithuanian civil airline was inaugurated on 5 September 1938 with domestic flights from Kaunas (the country's provisional capital at that time) to the coastal resort of Palanga. Later in 1939, Lietuvos oro linijos launched international flights to Riga (Latvia).

All international connections were disrupted on 16 June 1940, when the airport was captured by the Red Army. Civil flights to Moscow were launched at the end of 1940 after the formal integration of Lithuania into the Soviet Union.

In the early 1950s, regular civilian connections with other towns (but then only within the USSR) were opened. Due to a short runway and limited extension possibilities, the airport could accept only a very limited number of jet aircraft types. In the 1980s, Aleksotas Airport was considered one of the most dangerous airports in Europe due to its short runway. Due to this fact Kaunas was able to accommodate mostly prop and turboprop aircraft, such as Li-2, Il-14, An-24. It is claimed that only one type of jet - the Yak-40 - could use this airport. Even so, in the 1980s it was a base for about a dozen Yak-40 and An-24 airliners, connecting with nearly 30 cities within the USSR, as far as Odessa and Simferopol. Regular passenger flights in Aleksotas Airport were stopped in 1988 and were moved to a new Kaunas International Airport in Karmėlava at the northeastern outskirts of Kaunas. Paradoxically, the opening of the new airport coincided with a long-term decrease in the number of connections from Kaunas: the new airport had limited passenger facilities and the economic downturn of the early 1990s resulted in a significant overall reduction of air communication.

After the withdrawal of the Russian Air Force in 1993, Aleksotas / S. Darius and S. Girėnas Airport began to serve general aviation. The airport hosts the Kaunas Air Club.

Its historical importance makes it a natural host for the Lithuanian Aviation Museum. The old passenger terminal building was turned into the Aviation Museum on 19 February 1990.

== See also ==
- Steponas Darius and Stasys Girėnas
- List of airports in Lithuania
- Kyviškės Airfield

== External links, sources ==
- Kaunas Aeroclub
- S. Darius and S. Girėnas Aviation Club in Aleksotas
- Lithuanian Aviation Museum
