= ANBO II =

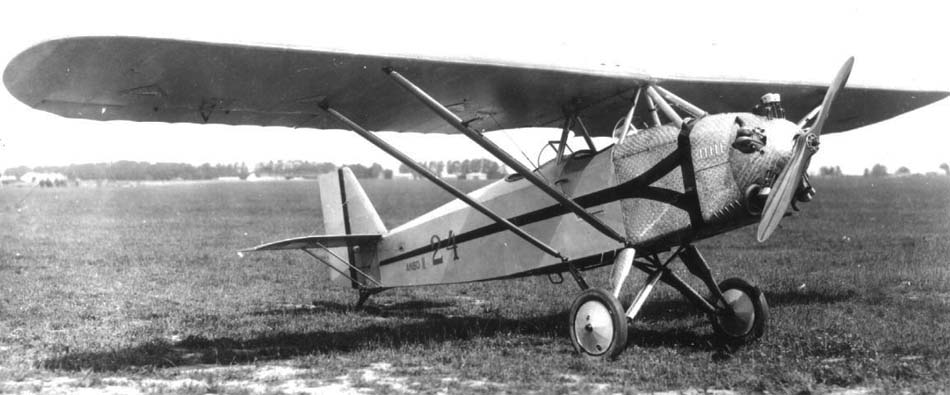

General information
- Type: Military trainer
- Manufacturer: Karo Aviacijos Tiekimo Skyrius
- Designer: Antanas Gustaitis
- Number built: 1 (+ 1 replica in 2016)

History
- First flight: 27 November 1927
- Retired: 26 June 1934
- Developed from: ANBO I
- Developed into: ANBO III

The ANBO II was a parasol-wing monoplane aircraft built in Lithuania in 1927 as a pilot trainer for the Army. It was the first Lithuanian trainer aircraft of own design. It was eventually re-equipped with more powerful engine for the Aero Club of Lithuania in 1931 before being written off after a crash in 1934.

The plane was not produced in series, yet it served as a prototype for latter trainers Anbo-III and Anbo-V/51, developed by Antanas Gustaitis.

== Replica ==
A full size flying replica was restored in 2012-2016 by Rolandas Kalinauskas and Arvydas Šabrinskas. Due to difficulties in obtaining original Walter engine, a Russian-made Shvetsov M-11 engine, having similar parameters, was used. Test flight of the restored Anbo II took place on 18 October 2016. The plane is based in Pociūnai airfield, Lithuania and is mostly used for air shows with both constructors dressing in Lithuanian Air Force uniforms of 1920s-1930s.

On August 8, 2021 after an engine failed during a climb at the altitude of 20–30 meters the aircraft crashed at Cesis Airfield, near Priekuļi, Latvia. The plane stalled resulting in a fatal crash for both the pilot Arvydas Šabrinskas, and the aircraft.

== Operators ==
Lithuania

- Lithuanian Air Force
- Aero Club of Lithuania

== Specifications ==
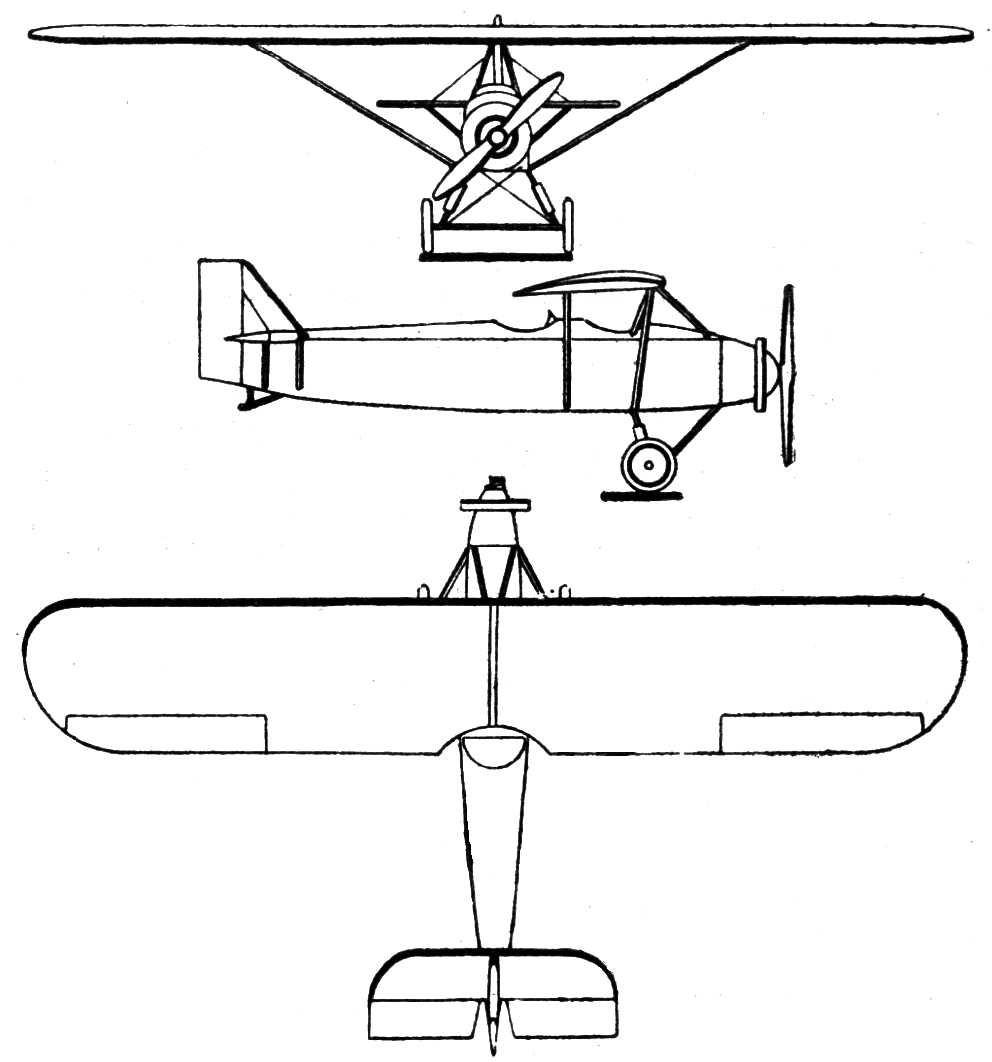
ANBO II 3-view drawing from Les Ailes December 23, 1928

General characteristics

- Crew: two, pilot and instructor
- Length: 6.75 m (22 ft 2 in)
- Wingspan: 10.72 m (35 ft 2 in)
- Wing area: 20 m^{2} (215 sq ft)
- Empty weight: 280 kg (620 lb)
- Gross weight: 550 kg (1,210 lb)
- Powerplant: 1 × Walter NZ 60 , 45 kW (60 hp)

Performance

- Maximum speed: 160 km/h (100 mph, 87 kn)
- Service ceiling: 3,500 m (11,500 ft)
- Rate of climb: 2.1 m/s (410 ft/min)

== Bibliography ==
- Ramoška, Gytis, Pirmasis lietuviškas mokomasis lėktuvas Anbo-II, Plieno sparnai, Nr. 5, 2008
- Taylor, Michael J. H. (1989). Jane's Encyclopedia of Aviation. London: Studio Editions.
- Lithuanian Aviation Museum
