= ANBO VI =

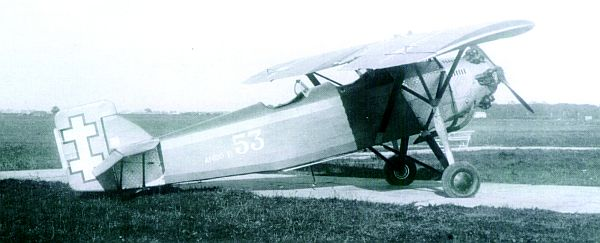

General information
- Type: Military trainer
- Manufacturer: Karo Aviacijos Tiekimo Skyrius
- Designer: Antanas Gustaitis
- Prototypes: ANBO III
- Number built: 4
- Serial: 53, 54, 55, 56

History
- First flight: June 30, 1933
- In service: 1933-1940
- Fate: Scrapped, none survives

The ANBO VI was a parasol-wing monoplane designed for the Lithuanian Army as a trainer in 1933, based on the ANBO III. Compared to its prototype the VI featured revised and widened landing gear and a more powerful engine.

A total of 4 ANBO VIs were made. The first batch of 2 aircraft - in 1933 (Serial No. 53 and 54), the second - in late 1933 and 1934 (Serial No. 55 and 56). No. 53 was first flown on June 30, 1933, No. 55 - on November 8, No. 55 - on December 15, No. 56 - January 10, 1934.

The first two VI's were powered by Curtiss R-600 Challenger six- cylinder radial engines. The engine proved to be unreliable and in second batch an older, less powerful yet more reliable Armstrong Siddeley Genet Major IV were used.

All four aircraft were used by Lithuanian Air Force for pilots training, aerial reconnaissance, photography and aerial target tug missions. All aircraft were assigned to two Kaunas-based reconnaissance squadrons - No 53 and 55 went to VI Sqn. and No. 54 and 56 - to II Sqn.

A late pre-WW2 camouflage was used with overall dark green, except for lower side of the wings and tail sections, which were painted silver. Aircraft tail numbers matched the manufacturer's serial numbers.

Whilst being used for training all four aircraft have experienced multiple crashes Two of them resulted in hull losses. Two remaining survived until the Soviet occupation of Lithuania in 1940. Unlike for combat Anbo IVs and 41s, the VIs did not attracted the Soviets' attention and were striped of salvageable parts and used as targets by 1941.

== Operators ==
Lithuania

- Lithuanian Air Force

== Specifications (ANBO VI) ==
General characteristics

- Crew: two, pilot and instructor
- Length: 7.25 m (23 ft 9 in)
- Wingspan: 11.35 m (37 ft 3 in)
- Wing area: 18.3 m^{2} (197 sq ft)
- Fuel capacity: 150 l (fuselage) + 30 l (wings)
- Powerplant: 1 × Curtiss Challenger , 138 kW (185 hp)

Performance

- Maximum speed: 205 km/h (128 mph, 111 kn)
- Minimum control speed: 85 km/h (53 mph, 46 kn)
- Endurance: 4 hours
- Service ceiling: 4,500 m (14,800 ft)

== Bibliography ==
- Taylor, Michael J. H. (1989). Jane's Encyclopedia of Aviation. London: Studio Editions.
- Lithuanian Aviation Museum
