= Walter Mars I =

1920s Czech piston aircraft engine

Mars I
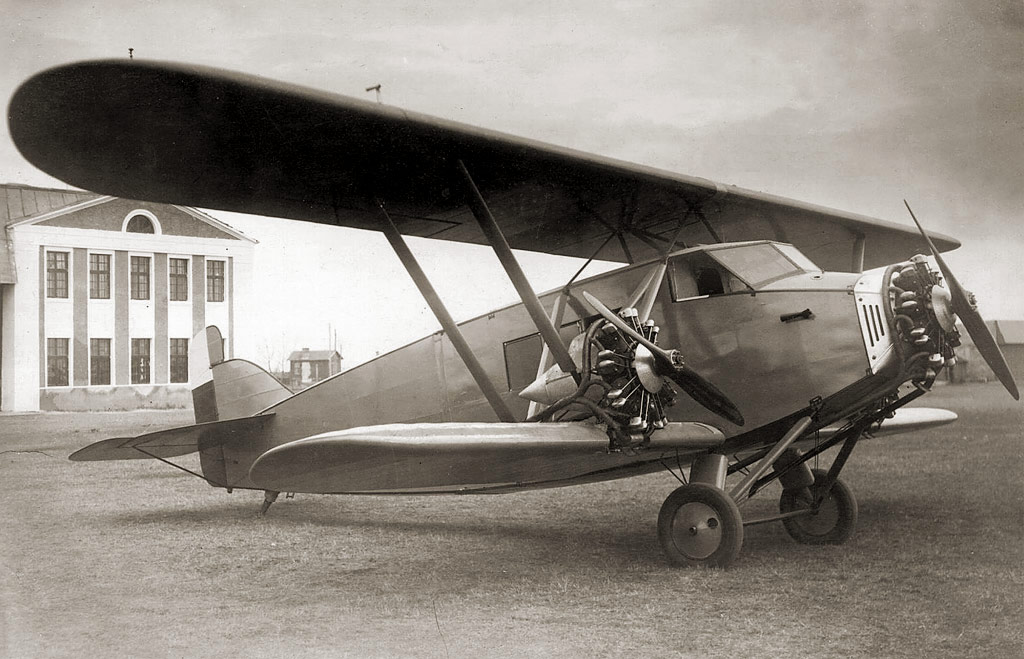
- Walter Mars I powered DAR 4 trimotor c. 1930
- Type: 9-cylinder radial engine
- National origin: Czechoslovakia
- Manufacturer: Walter Engines
- First run: c. 1929

The Walter Mars I was a nine-cylinder, air-cooled, radial engine for aircraft use built in Czechoslovakia in the late 1920s.

== Design and development ==
The Mars I was the largest capacity design of a series of three similar radial engines developed by the Walter company. Common cylinders were used for the five-cylinder Walter Vega and the seven-cylinder Walter Venus, the Mars I being a nine-cylinder engine.

== Applications ==
- ANBO III
- Breda Ba.15
- DAR 4
- DAR 6
- Fizir FN
- Focke-Wulf A 33
- Letov Š-32
- SET 10

== Specifications ==
Data from Flight, July 1929.

=== General characteristics ===
- Type: 9-cylinder radial engine
- Bore: 105 mm (5.90 in)
- Stroke: 120 mm (4.72 in)
- Displacement: 9.352 L (570.7 cu in)
- Dry weight: 159 kg (350 lb)

=== Components ===
- Fuel system: Zenith Type 42 carburettor; two plugs/cylinder and twin Scintilla magnetos
- Cooling system: Air-cooled
- Reduction gear: Direct drive

=== Performance ===
- Power output: 112 kW (150 hp)
- Compression ratio: 5.15:1
- Power-to-weight ratio: 0.72 kW/kg (0.43 hp/lb)

== See also ==
Related lists

- List of aircraft engines
