= Lithuanian Aviation Museum =

- Lietuvos aviacijos muziejus

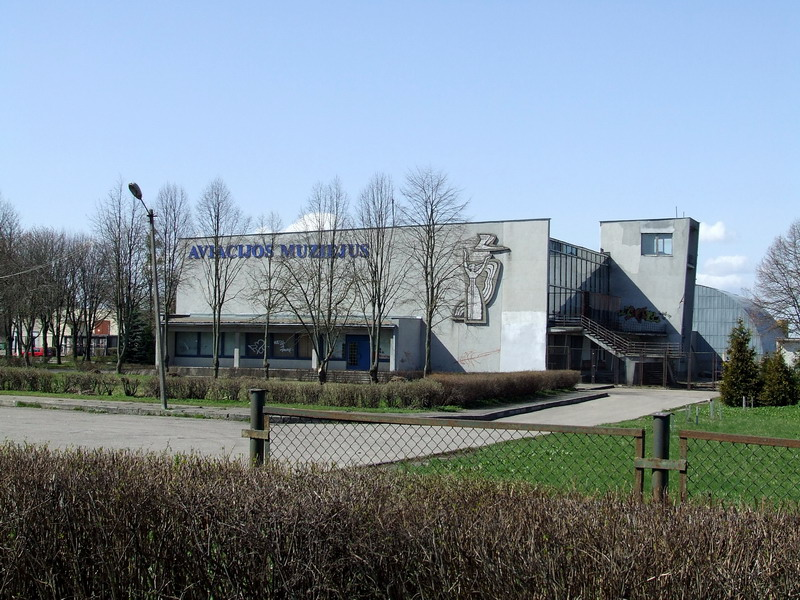
- Lithuanian Aviation Museum
- Established: 1983
- Location: Kaunas, Lithuania
- Coordinates: 54°52′41″N 23°53′25″E
- Type: Aerospace museum

The Lithuanian Aviation Museum (Lithuanian: Lietuvos aviacijos muziejus) is located in Kaunas, Lithuania. The museum was officially opened in 1983. The permanent collection of the museum contains more than 18 000 displays of different fields of technology. The major part of the collection is dedicated to the history of aviation in Lithuania. It includes about 40 flying machines, models of airplanes, flyers, gliders and helicopters of various times, and designed during the Interwar period of Lithuania first combat aircraft the ANBO I by General Antanas Gustaitis. The museum is located at the airfield where the aviators Steponas Darius and Stasys Girėnas were expected to land following their attempt at a non-stop trans-atlantic flight in 1933, and holds a flyable replica of their plane.

== History ==
The museum was officially opened in 1983. It has variously been called the Public Sports Aviation Museum and then until 1995 the Lithuanian Technical Museum. The museum is located at the airfield where the aviators Steponas Darius and Stasys Girėnas were expected to land following their attempt at a non-stop trans-atlantic flight in 1933. Darius and Girėnas crashed in an area that is now Pszczelnik, near the Myślibórz area, Poland and were both killed. The remains of their plane, the Lituanica are on display in the Vytautas the Great War Museum, rather than at the aviation museum. Entry to the museum is free on the last Sunday of each month.

== Collection ==
The permanent collection of the museum contains more than 18,000 displays of different fields of technology. The major part of the collection is dedicated to the history of aviation in Lithuania. It includes about 40 flying machines, models of airplanes, flyers, gliders and helicopters of various times, and designed during the Interwar period of Lithuania first combat aircraft the ANBO I by General Antanas Gustaitis. A virtual tour of the museum is available. The aviation museum does have a flyable replica of the Lituanica.

== Image gallery ==
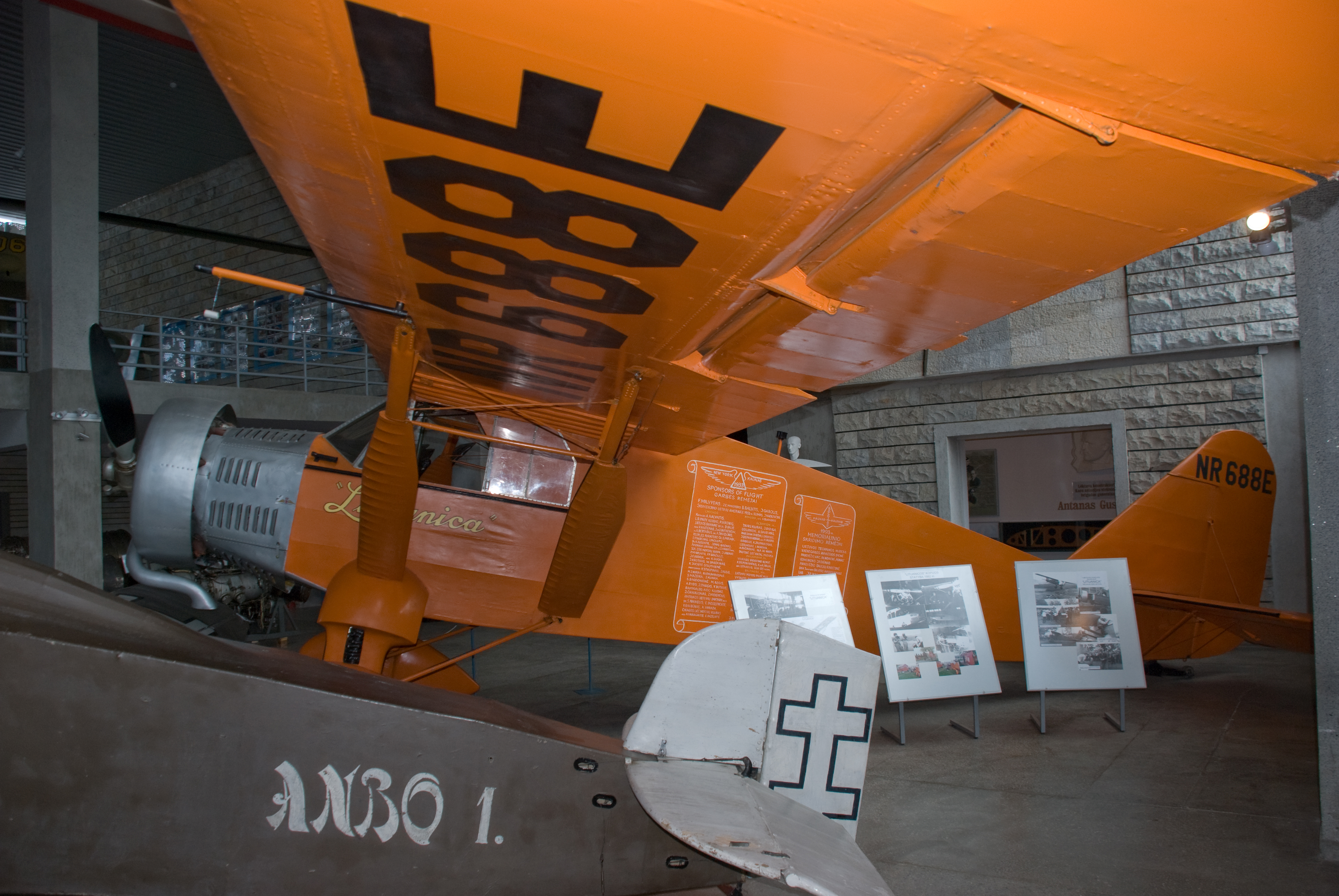
Lituanica replica

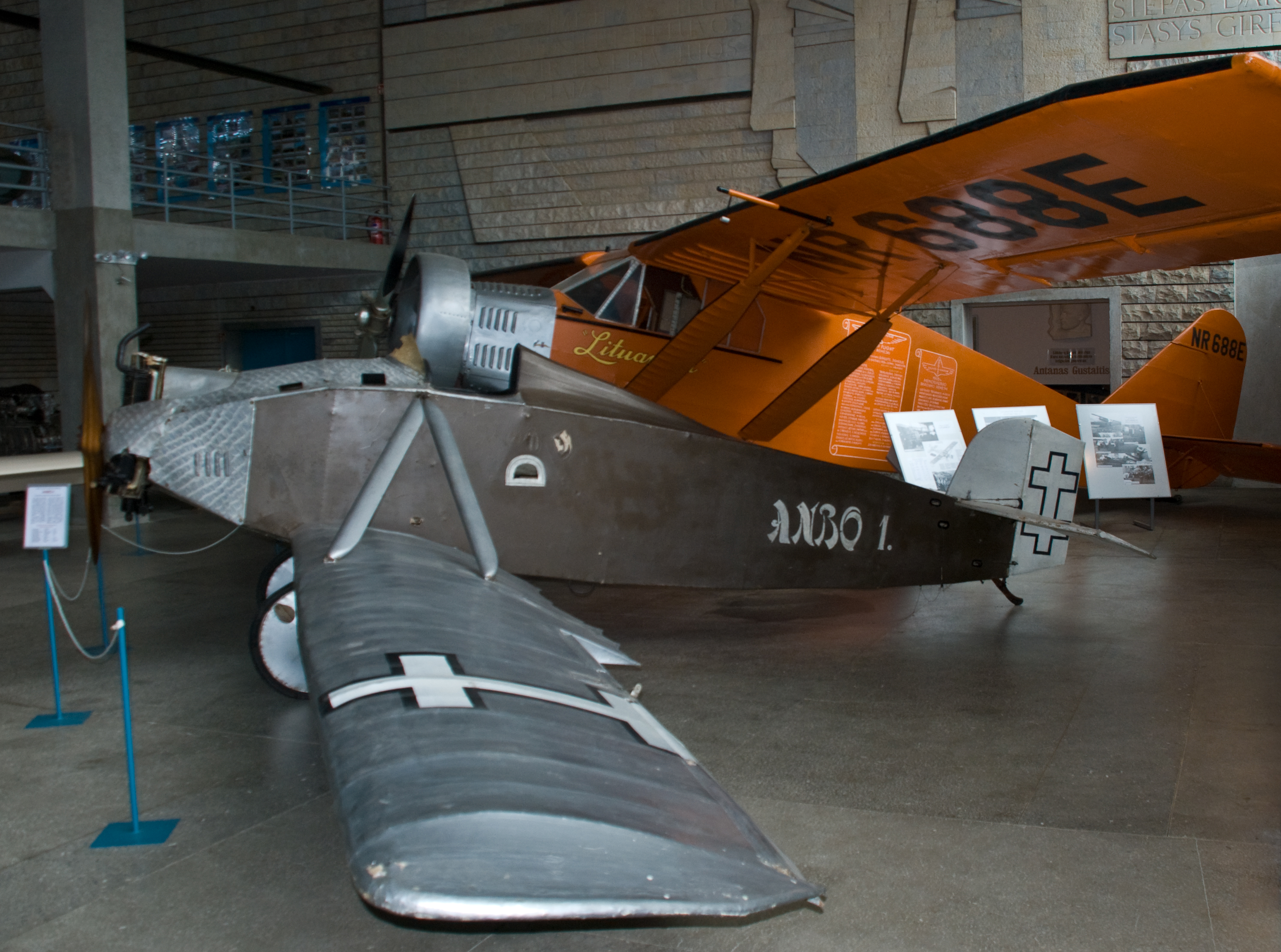
ANBO I

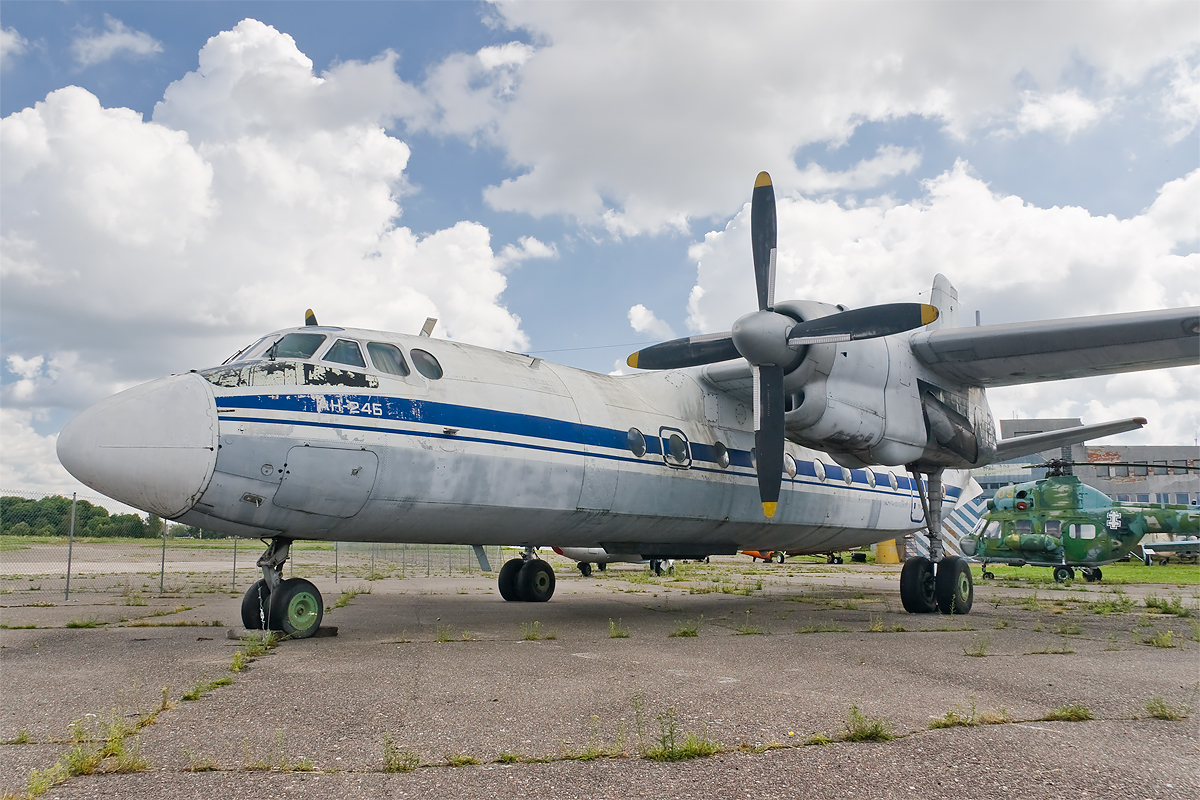
Former Lithuanian Air Force airplane Antonov An-24

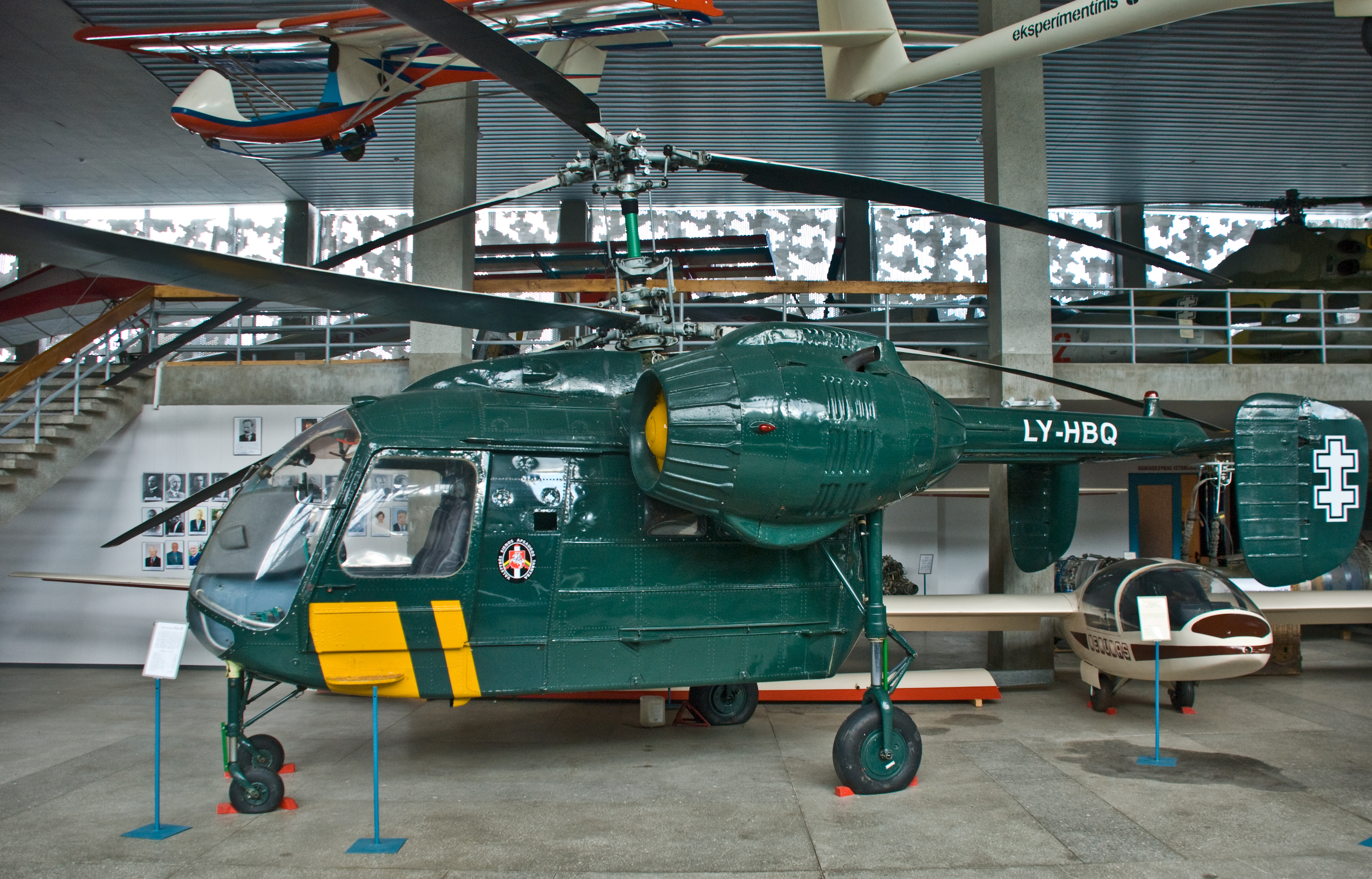
Former Lithuanian State Border Guard Service helicopter Kamov Ka-26

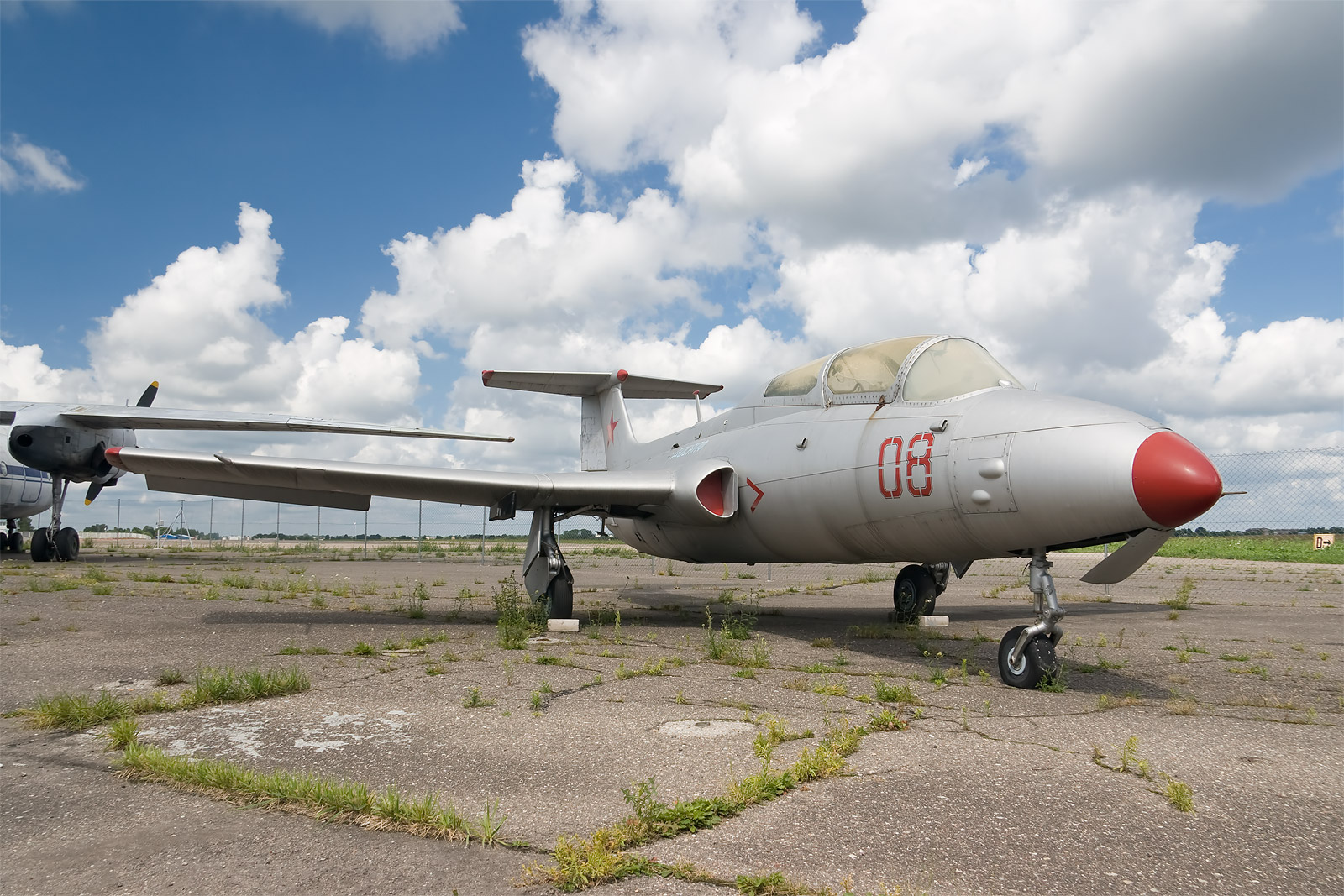
Jet plane Aero L-29

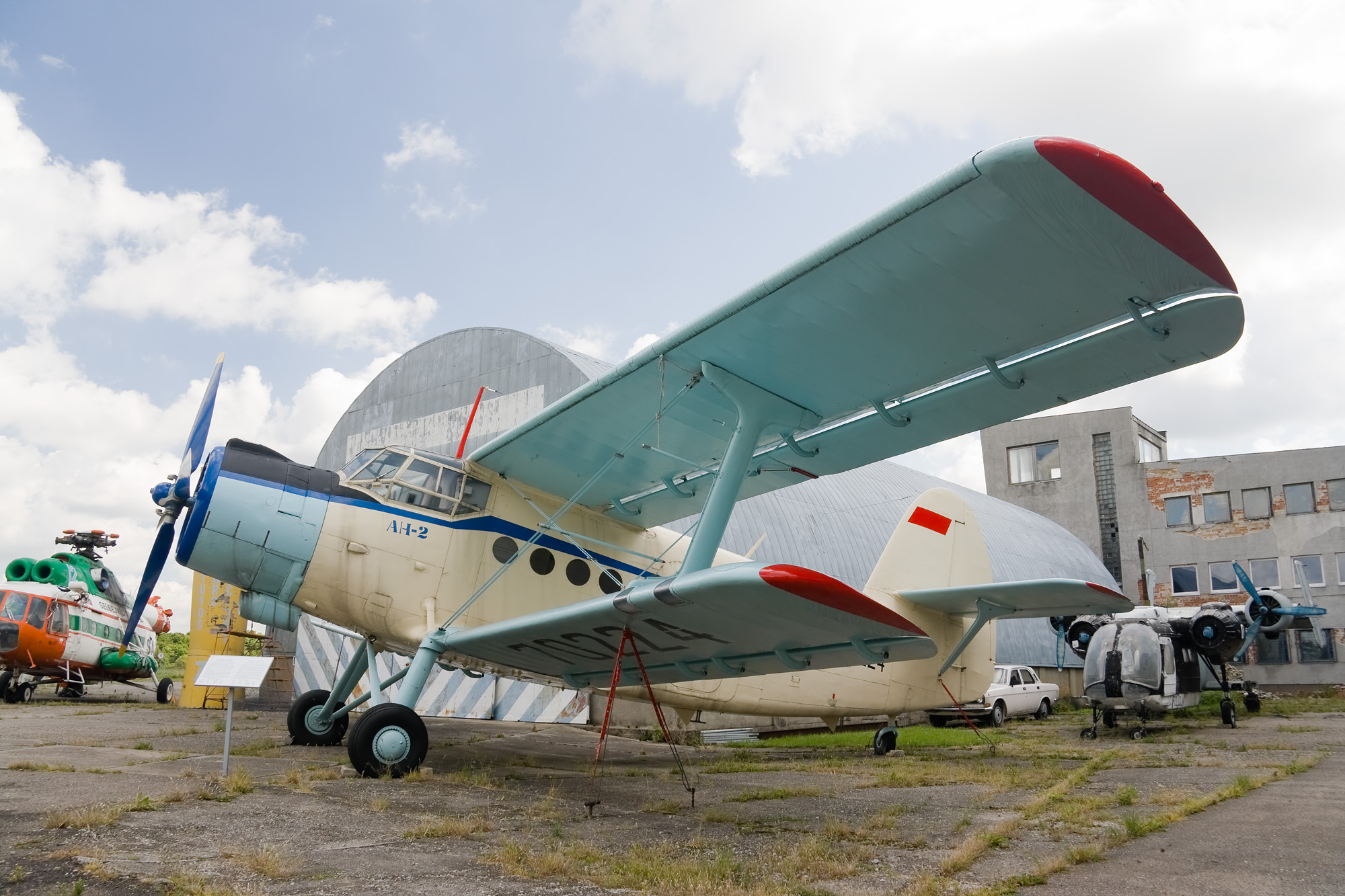
Biplane Antonov An-2

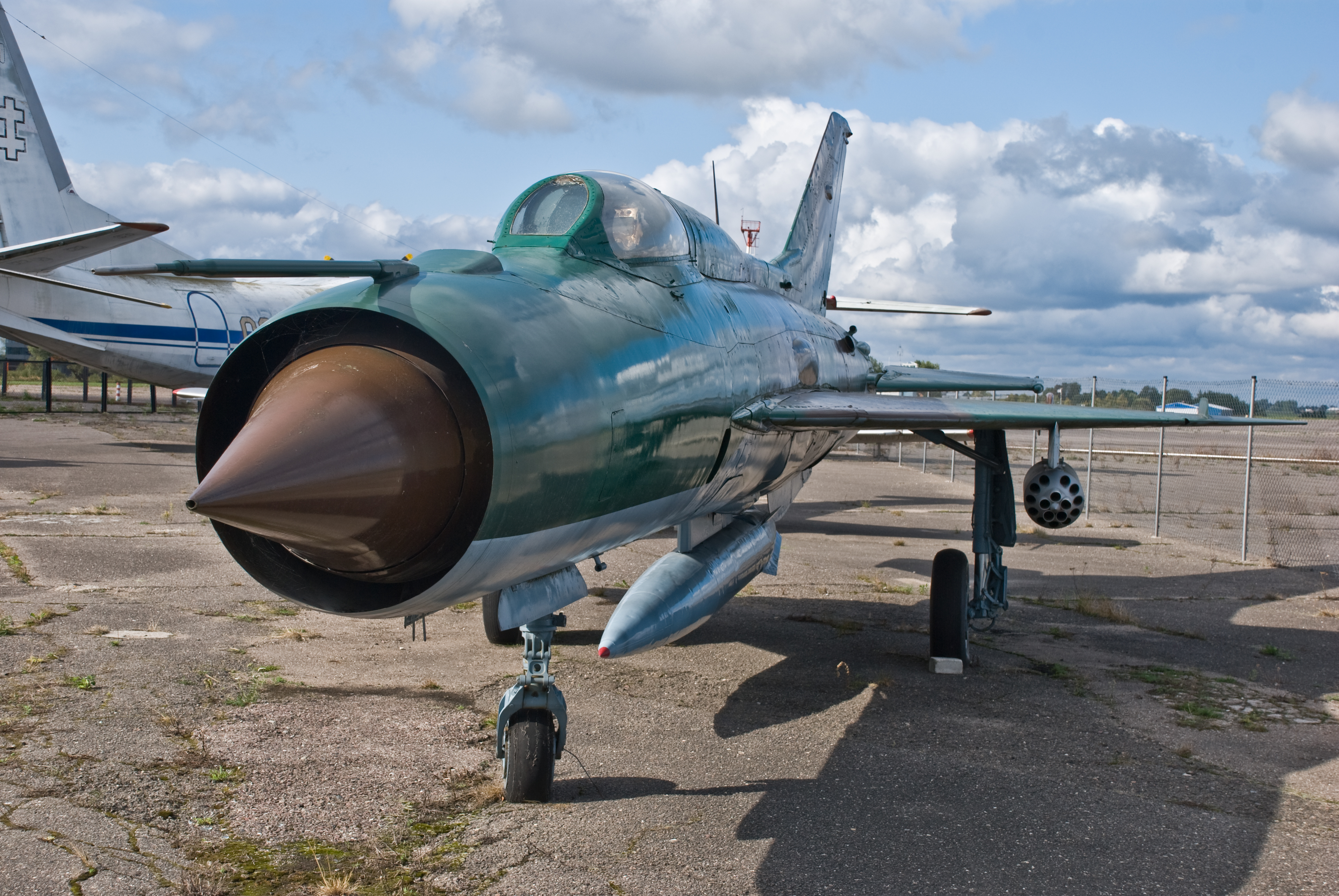
MiG-21

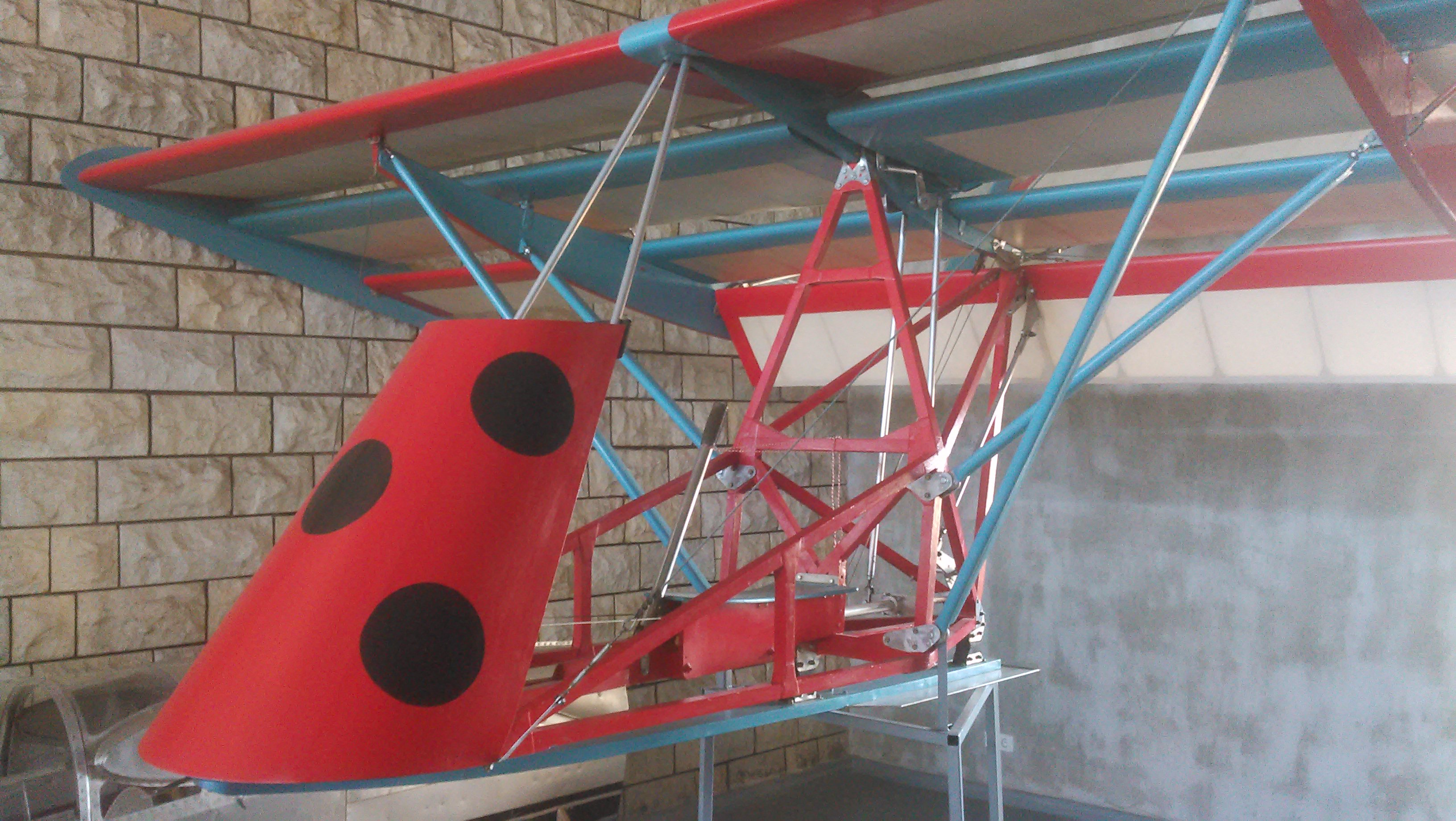
Glider BrO-18 Boružė (Ladybird), 1975. Smallest glider in the world.
