= SET 10 =

Romanian trainer aircraft prototype

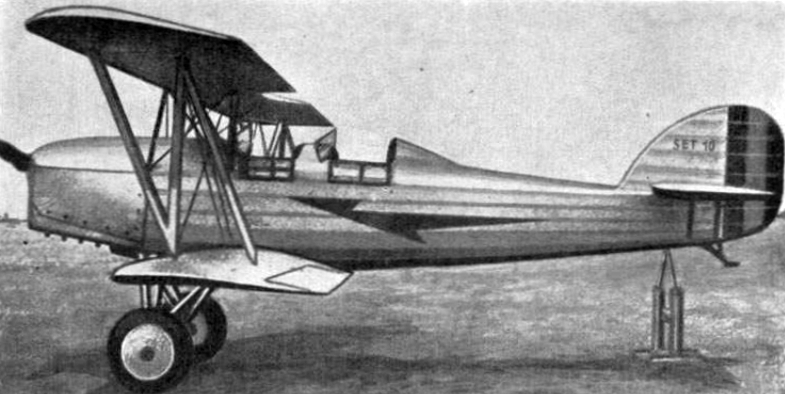

General information
- Type: Trainer aircraft
- Manufacturer: SET
- Designer: Grigore Zamfirescu
- Primary user: Romania
- Number built: 2

History
- First flight: 1932

The SET 10 (unrelated to the SET X design of the same year) was a trainer aircraft produced in Romania in prototype form in the early 1930s. It was a conventional, single-bay biplane with staggered wings braced with N-struts. It was equipped with fixed tailskid undercarriage, and seated the pilot and instructor in tandem, open cockpits. Intended for Romania's aeroclubs and Air Force, no production ensued.

In 1934 the SET 10 was advertised for club trainer use with a 108 kW (145 hp) Walter Mars I nine-cylinder radial engine. This gave it a top speed of 177 km/h (110 mph; 96 kn).

== Specifications (Walter mars engine) ==
Data from Jane's all the World's Aircraft 1937, Romanian Aeronautical Constructions 1905–1974

General characteristics

- Crew: 2
- Length: 7 m (23 ft 0 in)
- Wingspan: 9.46 m (31 ft 0 in)
- Height: 2.85 m (9 ft 4 in)
- Wing area: 22 m^{2} (240 sq ft)
- Empty weight: 580 kg (1,279 lb)
- Gross weight: 830 kg (1,830 lb)
- Powerplant: 1 × Walter Mars I 9-cylinder air-cooled radial piston engine, 108 kW (145 hp)
- Propellers: 2-bladed fixed pitch propeller

Performance

- Maximum speed: 177 km/h (110 mph, 96 kn) at sea level; 160 km/h (99 mph; 86 kn) at 2,000 m (6,600 ft)
- Stall speed: 66 km/h (41 mph, 36 kn)
- Service ceiling: 5,000 m (16,000 ft)
- Time to altitude: 1,000 m (3,300 ft) in 3 minutes 44 seconds

2,000 m (6,600 ft) in 9 minutes 3 seconds
3,000 m (9,800 ft) in 16 minutes
4,000 m (13,000 ft) in 28 minutes

- Wing loading: 37.7 kg/m^{2} (7.7 lb/sq ft)
- Power/mass: 0.1392 kW/kg (0.0847 hp/lb)

Armament

- Guns: 1x optional fixed forward firing synchronised machine gun
