= ANBO I =

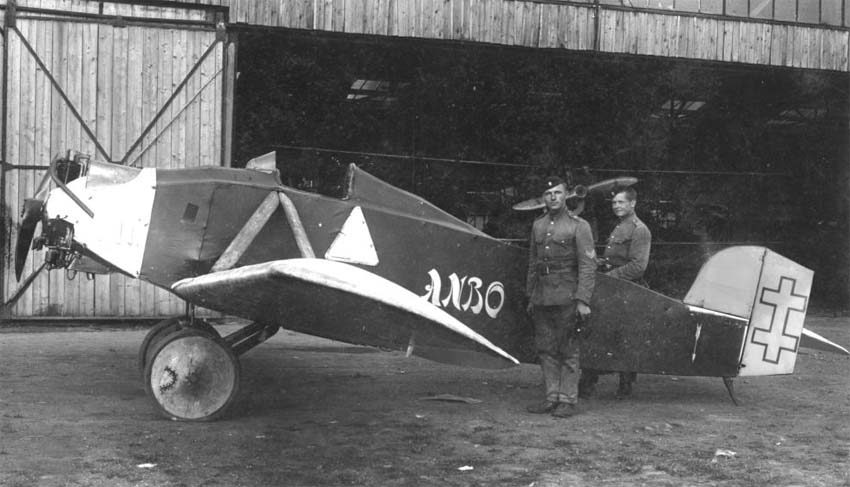

General information
- Type: Prototype trainer aircraft
- Manufacturer: Karo Aviacijos Tiekimo Skyrius
- Designer: Antanas Gustaitis
- Number built: 1

History
- First flight: 14 July 1925
- Retired: 1935
- Developed into: ANBO II

The ANBO I was a single-seat aircraft developed in Lithuania, proposed as a trainer for the Lithuanian Army. It was a low-wing, braced monoplane of conventional tailwheel configuration. The fuselage structure was of fabric-covered welded steel tube, The wing had a wooden, two-spar structure and was fabric covered but the fuselage, also fabric covered, had a welded steel tube structure.

The first flight took place in 1925. Ten years later the aircraft was sold to the Lithuanian Aviation Museum in Kaunas where it is exhibited today.

== Operators ==
Lithuania

- Lithuanian Air Force

== Specifications ==
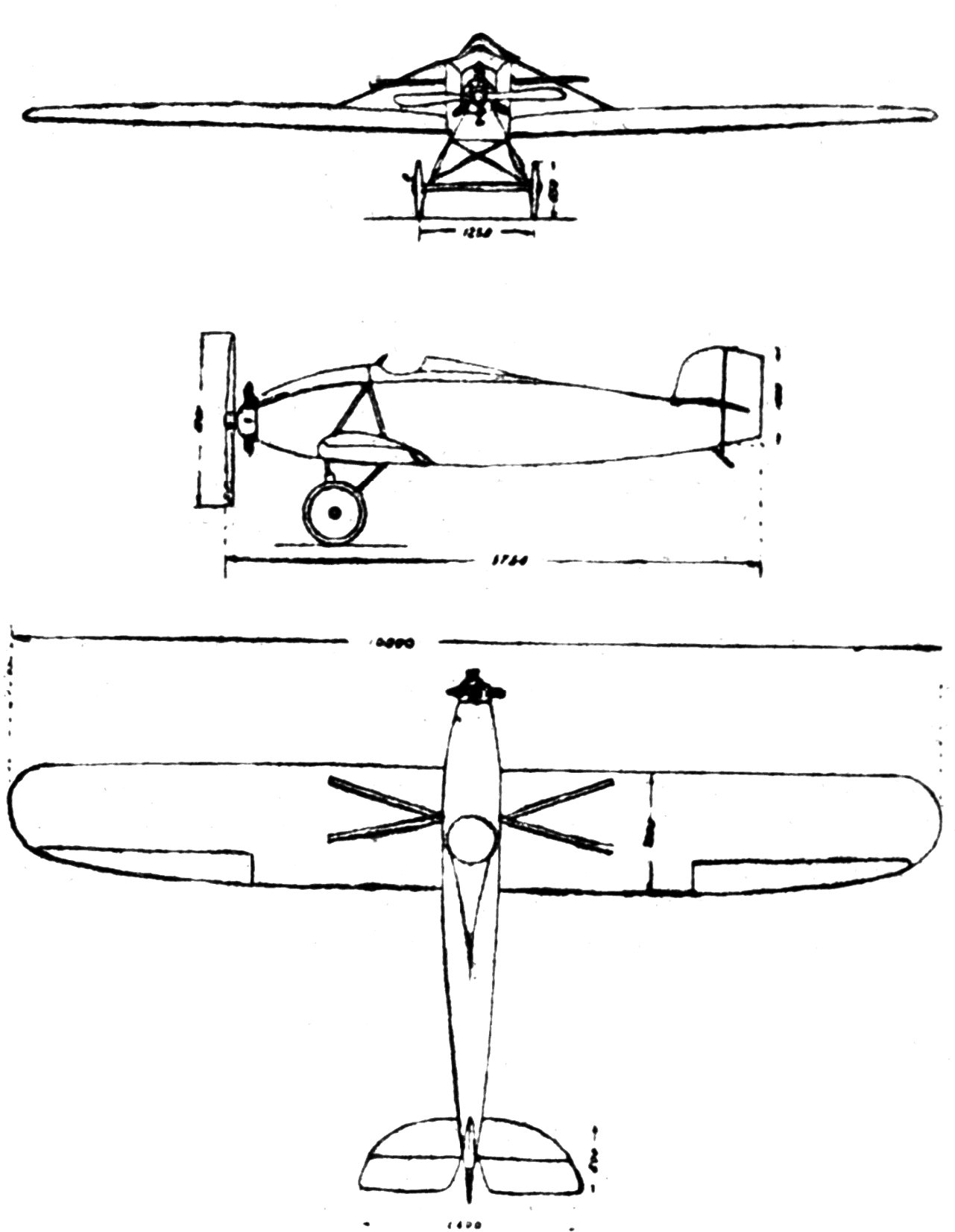
Anbo I 3-view drawing from L'Air January 15, 1926

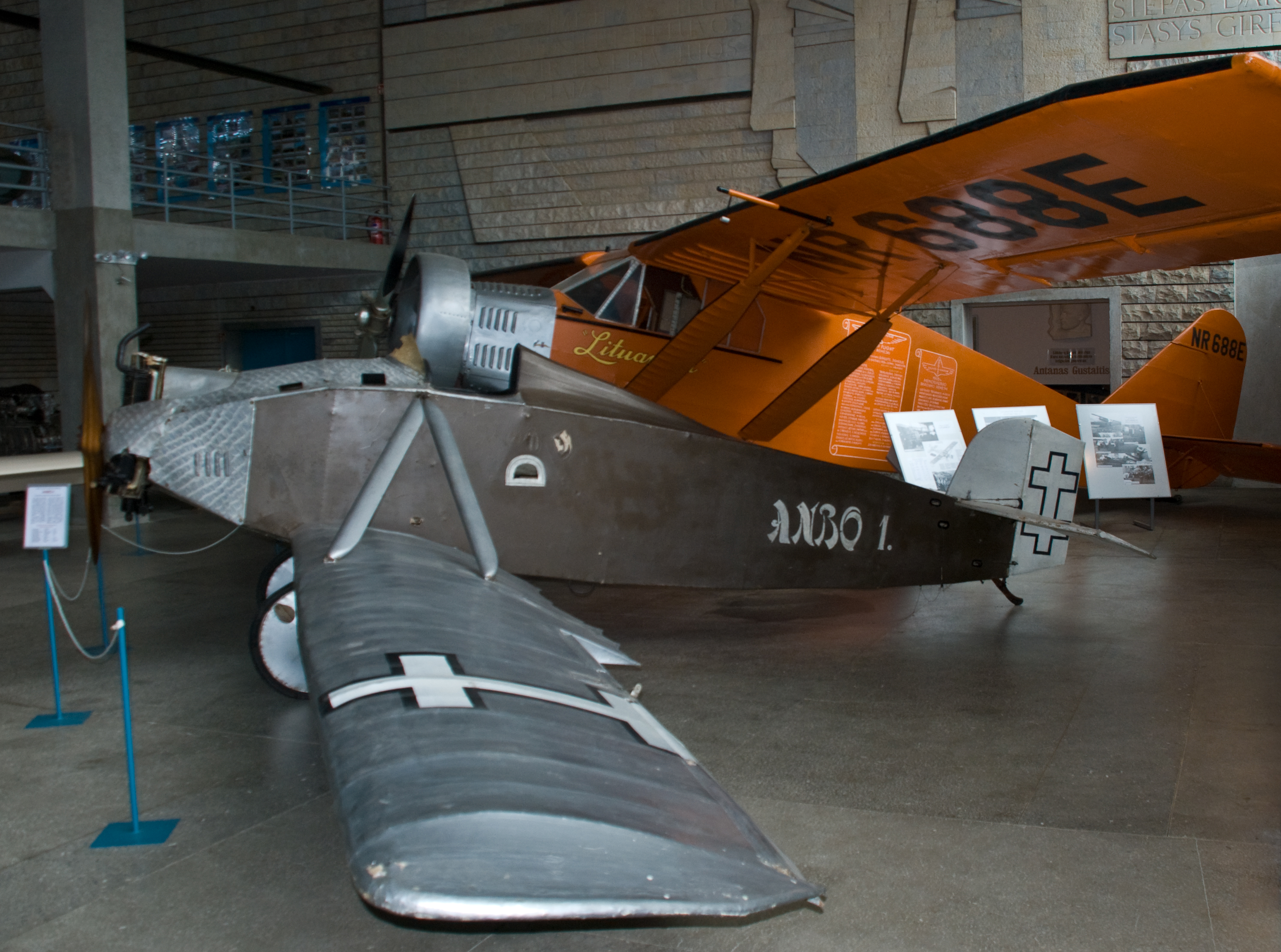
ANBO I exhibited in the Lithuanian Aviation Museum in Kaunas, Lithuania

Data from Les Ailes, November 1925

General characteristics

- Crew: One
- Length: 5.75 m (18 ft 10 in)
- Wingspan: 10 m (32 ft 10 in)
- Height: 1.95 m (6 ft 5 in)
- Wing area: 11.40 m^{2} (122.7 sq ft)
- Empty weight: 190 kg (419 lb) equipped
- Gross weight: 300 kg (661 lb)
- Fuel capacity: 35 kg (77 lb) fuel and oil
- Powerplant: 1 × Anzani 3-cylinder radial, 30 kW (40 hp)
- Propellers: 2-bladed Dorand, 1.90 m (6 ft 3 in) diameter

Performance

- Maximum speed: 142 km/h (88 mph, 77 kn) at ground level
- Endurance: 4 hr
- Service ceiling: 4,200 m (13,800 ft)
- Time to altitude: 7 min to 1,000 m (3,300 ft)
- Take-off distance: 30 m (98 ft)
- Landing distance: 40 m (130 ft)
