= Letov Š-32 =

Š-32
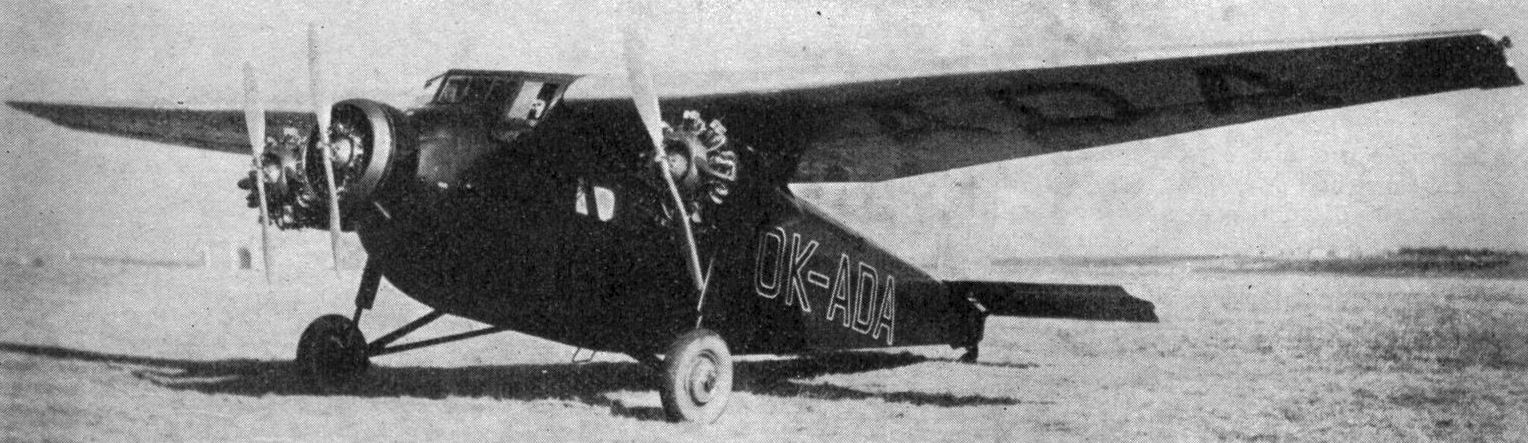

General information
- Type: Airliner
- National origin: Czechoslovakia
- Manufacturer: Letov
- Designer: Alois Šmolik
- Primary user: ČSA
- Number built: 5

History
- First flight: 1931

The Letov Š-32 was an airliner produced in small numbers in Czechoslovakia during the 1930s. It was a trimotor monoplane with a high, cantilever wing, and was designed to meet a requirement by ČSA for a machine to service a night route between Prague, Bratislava, Uzhorod, and Bucharest. It could carry up to six passengers in a fully enclosed cabin which was praised at the time as being "particularly roomy and lofty". The wings were of all-metal construction, and the fuselage was built up from steel tube and was mostly skinned in metal, other than its very rear part, which, like the empennage, was fabric-covered.

ČSA bought and operated five of these machines. On 26 June 1934, one of these (registered OK-ADB) crashed during final approach to Karlovy Vary, killing all three on board, most notably the famous Austrian actor Max Pallenberg.

== Specifications ==
Data from Monografie: Letov Š-32

General characteristics

- Crew: two pilots
- Capacity: Up to six passengers, but more usually configured for four or five
- Length: 11.60 m (38 ft 1 in)
- Wingspan: 17.24 m (56 ft 7 in)
- Wing area: 39.92 m^{2} (4.0 sq ft)
- Empty weight: 1,884 kg (4,154 lb)
- Gross weight: 2,750 kg (6,063 lb)
- Powerplant: 3 × Walter Mars I nine-cylinder radial engine, 107 kW (143 hp) each

Performance

- Maximum speed: 200 km/h (120 mph, 110 kn)
- Cruise speed: 180 km/h (110 mph, 97 kn)
- Range: 600 km (370 mi, 320 nmi)
- Service ceiling: 4,000 m (13,000 ft)
