= Lithuanian Air Force =

Air warfare branch of Lithuania's military

- Lietuvos Karinės Oro Pajėgos
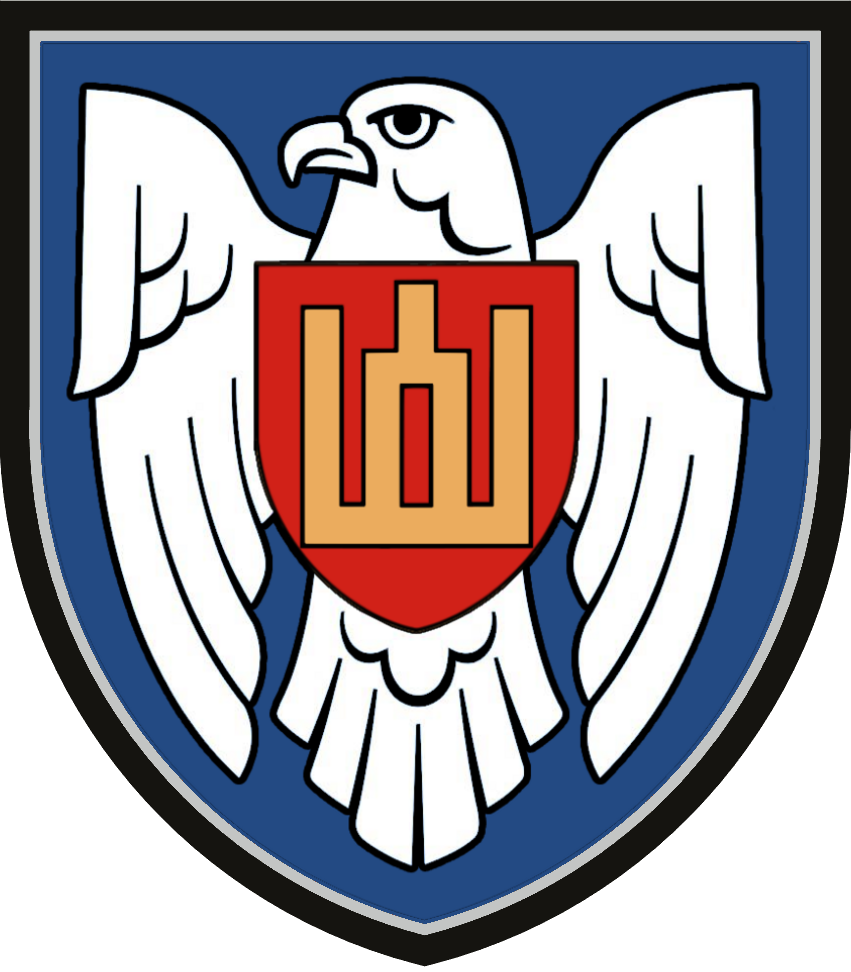
- Coat of arms of the Lithuanian Air Force
- Active: 1919–1940, 1992–present
- Country: Lithuania
- Type: Air force
- Role: Aerial warfare
- Size: 1,500
- Part of: Lithuanian Armed Forces
- Headquarters: Gedimino 25, LT-44319 Kaunas
- Anniversaries: 12 March 1919; 2 January 1991

Commanders
- Commander: Colonel Antanas Matutis
- Notable commanders: Brigadier General Antanas Gustaitis

Insignia
- Roundel

- Flag

Aircraft flown
- Helicopter: AS365 N3+, UH-60M
- Transport: C-27J, L-410, Cessna 172

The Lithuanian Air Force or LAF (Lithuanian: Lietuvos karinės oro pajėgos, abbreviated as LK KOP) is the military aviation branch of the Lithuanian Armed Forces. It is formed from professional military servicemen and non-military personnel. Units are located at Zokniai Air Base near the city Šiauliai, at Radviliškis and Kaunas.

== History ==
=== 1919–1940 ===
Antanas Gustaitis at a Lithuanian airfield in the 1930s

After the declaration of Lithuania to be an independent state on February 16, 1918, the most urgent task of the new government was to organize a military force that could repel enemy armies that were coming from all sides. The first order for the creation of a Lithuanian army came on November 23, 1918.

In January 1919, an Engineering Company was formed within the military, which contained an Aviation Squad. On March 12, 1919, the group was reorganized into an Aviation Company and became an independent military unit. Its leader was appointed to be marine engineer officer Petras Petronis. This date is considered to be the birthday of the Lithuanian Air Force.

Between March and December 1919 and between 1932 and 1940, the Kaunas Military Aviation School operated in that city. The school trained officers in various aviation disciplines: pilots, observers, gunners and mechanics.

The first aircraft (Sopwith 1½ Strutter) was taken by the Lithuanian military from the Red Army, on February 5, 1919, at the city of Jieznas. On February 27, 1919, eight new LVG C.VI reconnaissance aircraft were received. They had been purchased in Germany. In June, five more aircraft were purchased. In the following years some aircraft were taken as war booty and repaired in Lithuanian Aviation workshops, many were purchased from various countries. Later during the interwar period, Lithuania had its native ANBO series of aircraft built by the Lithuanian military officers and aircraft designers Jurgis Dobkevičius and Antanas Gustaitis.

The Lithuanian Military Aviation was active in Lithuanian wars of independence battles with the Red Army and Polish military units. The pilot performing the most military sorties was Jurgis Dobkevičius, who later became the first Lithuanian aircraft designer and builder. On May 12, 1920, Vytautas Rauba was the first Lithuanian aviator to lose his life in an aircraft crash. On October 4 of the same year, in a fight with the advancing Polish military during staged Želigowski's mutinity, the first aircraft with a Lithuanian crew was shot down. The pilot of the aircraft, Juozas Kumpis, commander of Lithuania's First Air Squadron, was severely injured and died as prisoner of the Polish military.

Starting in 1920 the military aviation branch was renamed a number of times and sometime after 1928 it was named to the equivalent of the Lithuanian Air Force.

The Lithuanian Air Force supported and encouraged various aeronautics related activities, such as the sport of gliding. In 1933, in cooperation with Aero Club of Lithuania, they helped establish a Lithuanian Gliding School in Nida and send their only experienced glider pilot, Gregorius Radvenis, to be the school's instructor and supervisor.

In 1940, the Lithuanian Air Force consisted of eight Air Squadrons, including reconnaissance, fighter, bomber and training units. Air Force bases had been established in the cities and towns of Kaunas / Žagariškės, Šiauliai / Zokniai Air Base), Panevėžys / Pajuostis. In the summer time, airfields near the cities of Palanga and Rukla were also used. A total of 117 aircraft and 230 pilots and observers were listed in the books by mid-1940, at the moment of occupation of Lithuania by the Soviet Union.

Inventory in mid-1940
Aircraft	Origin	Type	Variant	Number in service	Notes
Anbo IV / 41	Lithuania	Reconnaissance / light bomber	IV, 41	32	12 ANBO IV, 20 ANBO 41
Anbo VIII	Lithuania	Bomber		1	Single pre-production unit, built in 1939
Ansaldo A.120	Italy	Reconnaissance / light bomber	Ady	< 5	Out of the batch of 12, ordered in 1929
Dewoitine D.501	France	Fighter	L	13	14 acquired in 1937. No. D601-614
Fiat CR.20	Italy	Fighter		7	15 acquired in 1928.
Gloster Gladiator	United Kingdom	Fighter	Mk. I	12	14 acquired in 1937. No. G704-717
de Havilland DH.89 Dragon Rapide	United Kingdom	Executive transport / liaison	89M	2	Acquired in 1937
LVG C.VI	Germany	Liaison / trainer		2	Since 1929 withdrawn from first line service and used for training and liaison purposes
Anbo III	Lithuania	Advanced trainer		9	Built in 1930 - 1931
Anbo V / 51	Lithuania	Basic trainer	V, 51	13	Five Anbo V built in 1931, five Anbo 51 built in 1936, five in 1938
Anbo VI	Lithuania	Trainer / liaison		3	Out of 4, built in 1933-1934
Avro 626	United Kingdom	Advanced trainer		3	Acquired in 1937. No. 701, 702, 703
Bucker-133 "Jungmeister"	Germany	Advanced trainer	C	6	Acquired in 1939

Following the Soviet occupation of Lithuania the Lithuanian Air Force was formally disbanded on October 23, 1940. Part of Lithuanian Air Force (77 senior officers, 72 junior officers, 59 privates, 20 aircraft) was reorganized into Red Army's 29th Territorial Rifle Corps Aviation, also referred to as National Squadron (Tautinė eskadrilė). Other planes and equipment were taken over by Red Army's Air Force Bases No. 13 and 213. About third of Tautinė eskadrilė's personnel later suffered repressions by Soviet authorities, a significant number joined June uprising, after the start of German invasion of the Soviet Union several Tautinė eskadrilė pilots and fewer than six planes withdrew with the Soviet army.

=== After 1992 ===
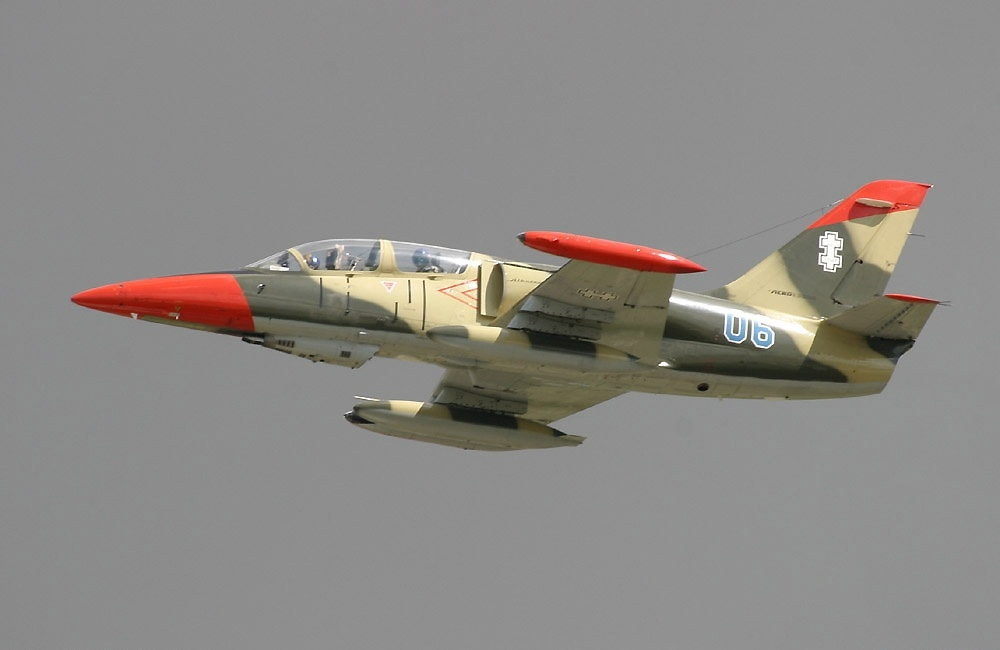
Lithuanian Air Force Aero L-39ZA Albatros Blue 08 in early multicolour camouflage

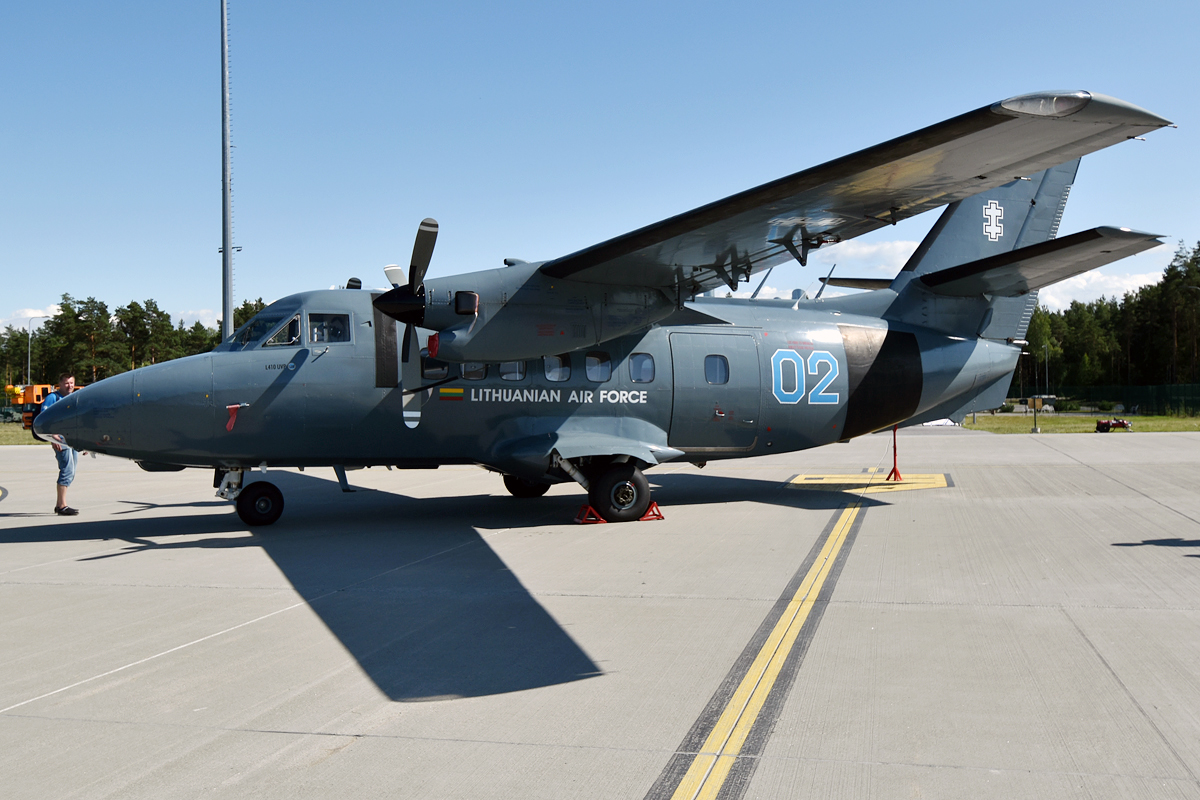
Lithuanian Air Force Let L-410UVP Turbolet Blue 02 in late single colour camouflage

On 23 January 1992, the Minister of Defense signed an order establishing the staff for the Aviation Base of the Aviation Service. But an actual base in the Šiauliai airport territory (Barysiai airfield) was not established until March, when all the infrastructure, buildings, territory and 24 An-2 aircraft were transferred from Lithuanian Airlines to the Aviation Service of the Ministry of Defense in January 1992. On 12 June 1992, the first time after regaining the independence of Lithuania, An-2 aircraft, marked with the double cross of Vytis on its wings – the distinguishing sign of Lithuanian Air Force – took off from Barysiai airfield. This date is considered to be the Aviation Base foundation date. In February 1993 four L-39C Albatros aircraft were brought from Kyrgyzstan.

After 1 March 1993 Aviation Service was reformed to the Lithuanian Air Force and Aviation Base was renamed the First Aviation Base of the Lithuanian Air Force. In January 1994 Lithuania officially applied for NATO membership. From 1995 to 1999, the First Aviation Base was relocated to Zokniai aerodrome nearby Šiauliai, which was used for fighter wing, radio-electronic fight and reconnaissance squadrons dislocation during the Soviet occupation. By the decree of the Minister of Defense of the Republic of Lithuania Linas Linkevičius, the First Aviation Base and the Second Aviation Base were reorganized into the Lithuanian Air Force Aviation Base as of 1 October 2004. Up to 2004, there were only light attack jet aircraft and transport aircraft located at the Air Base, after the reconstruction of First and Second Air Bases, helicopters are located at the Air Base too.

In 2007, two L-39ZA aircraft underwent extension of technical resources in Romania. Maintenance works included exhaustive check-up of the aircraft units and major engine repairs. New navigation equipment GNS 530 was installed and radio communication sets changed in pilot cabins. These planes are used to train fighter control officers in air policing mission and fighter command officers. Furthermore, a complex program of capital overhaul, upgrade and modernisation of the Air Force's helicopters Mi-8 and twin engine short-range transport aircraft L-410 was conducted.

Sometime before August 2023 Lithuania donated 2 Mi-8s to Ukraine.

In April 2024, Lithuanian Air Force donated a decommissioned, disassembled Aero L-39ZA Albatros to Ukraine.

== Structure ==
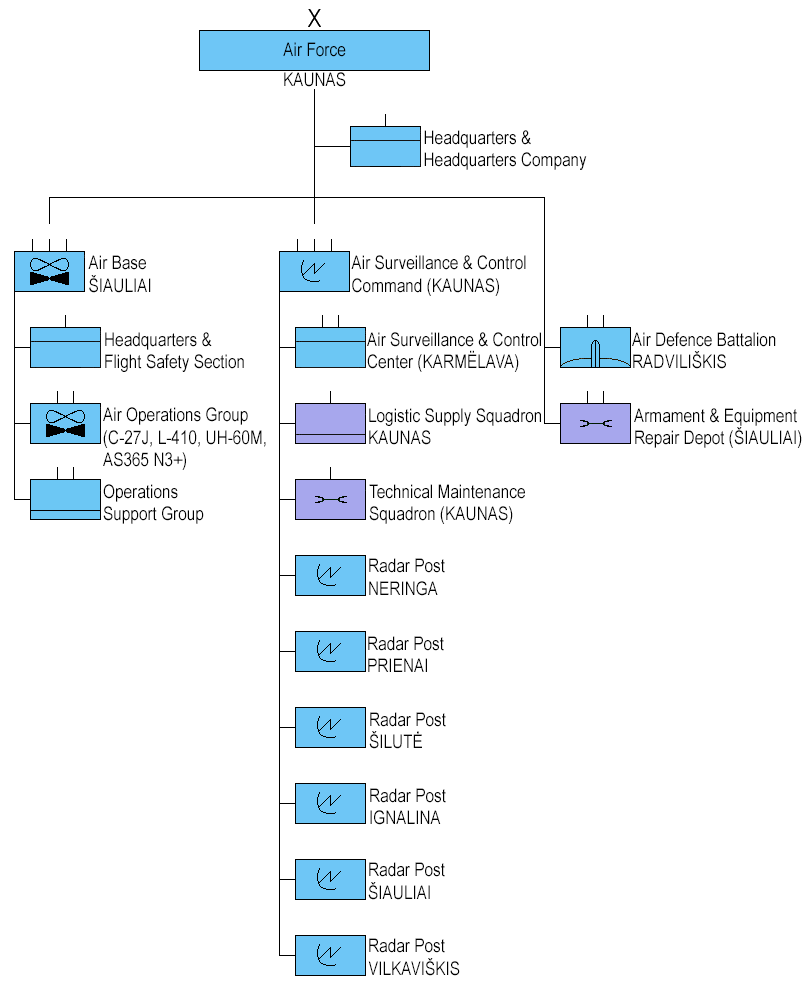
Lithuanian Air Force organization 2025

Lithuanian Air Force locations 2025:
Air Base
Air Defence Battalion
Air Space Control Centre
Radar post with LANZA 3D
Radar post

The Lithuanian Air Force Headquarters and the Airspace Surveillance and Control Command are located in Kaunas. The Air Surveillance and Control Command reports to the Baltic Air Surveillance Network's Regional Airspace Surveillance Coordination Centre (RASCC) co-located in Karmėlava, which in turn reports to CAOC Uedem. The Air Base, and Armament and Equipment Repair Depot are based at Šiauliai Air Base. The Air Defence Battalion is based in Radviliškis.

=== Air base ===
The main air base is located in the city of Šiauliai. It is staffed with professional military and also non-military personnel. It consists of a headquarters, air operation group and operational support group. The base operates various fixed wing and rotary blade aircraft. The staff, aircraft and equipment of the Air Base has participated in many international training missions abroad and at home. Main tasks of the Air Base are:

- Host nation Support for NATO Baltic Air Policing forces
- Search and Rescue
- Passenger, cargo and VIP transport
- Air medical evacuation
- Personnel deployment
- Army and Navy air support
- Air base personnel combat readiness training

=== Air Defence Battalion ===
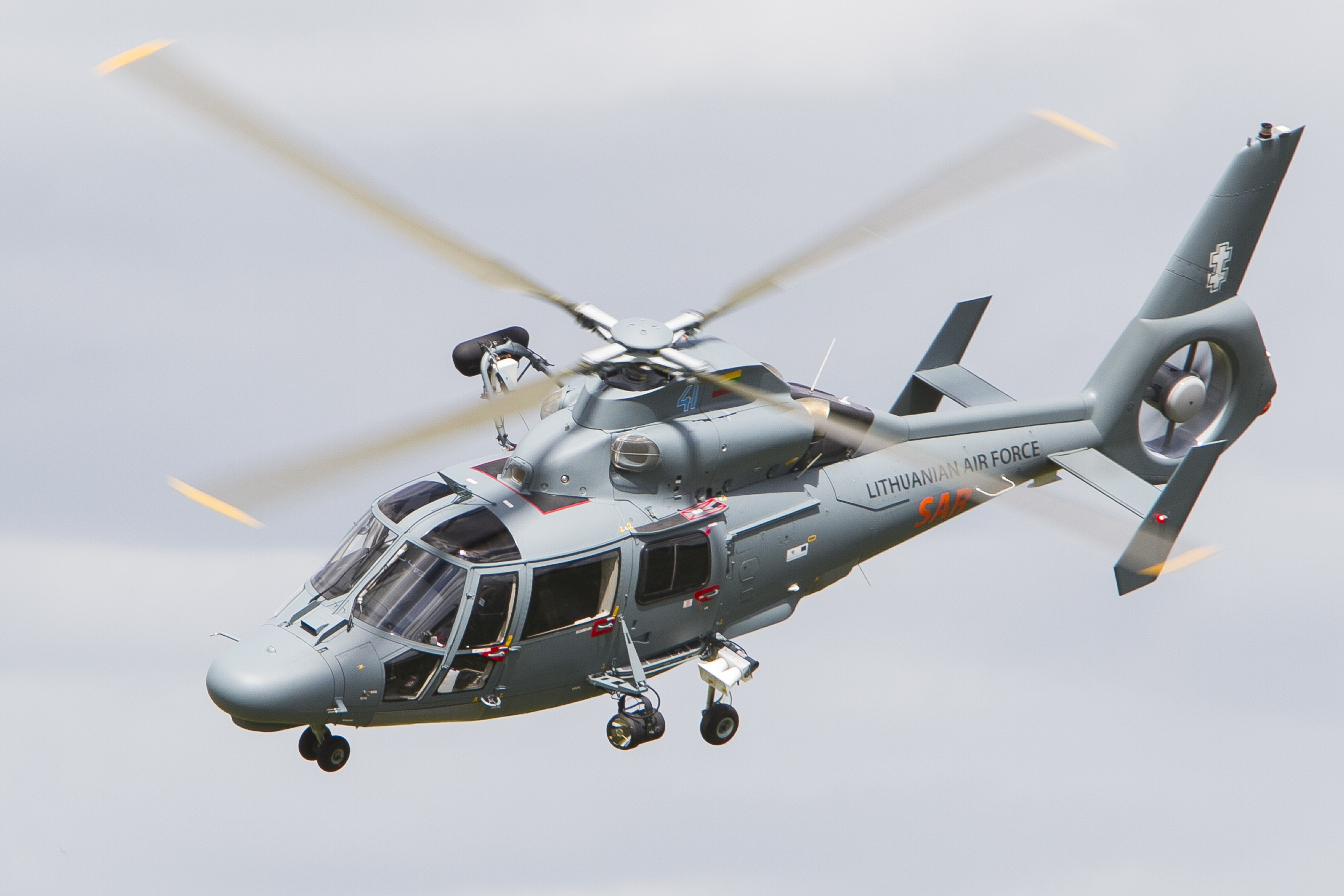
Lithuanian Air Force AS365 N3+ Dauphin

The Air Defence Battalion’s primary missions include:

- Defend state facilities of vital importance against military aviation attacks from the air in low and medium altitude
- Support land forces in fighting against ground armoured technical equipment and in other events
- Train military personnel in carrying out combat tasks

Development of infrastructure is one key missions of the Air Defence Battalion currently in the stage of development.

=== Airspace Surveillance and Control Command ===
The Airspace Surveillance and Control Command works closely with the Baltic States Air Surveillance System, BALTNET. The appropriate legal documentation of the BALTNET project was developed, the Reciprocal Memorandum of Understanding concerning military personnel training was signed among Lithuanian, Estonian, Latvian, and Danish Ministries of Defence. The Regional Air Spaces Surveillance Co-ordination Centre (RASSCC), headquarters of the BALTNET project, was established in the LTAF Airspace Control Centre and has been fully functioning since early 2000. Military personnel from all the three Baltic States serve as air surveillance operators at the centre and rotate according to national timetables. The Commander of the centre is appointed for two years and represents one of the Baltic States.

=== Armament and equipment repair depot ===
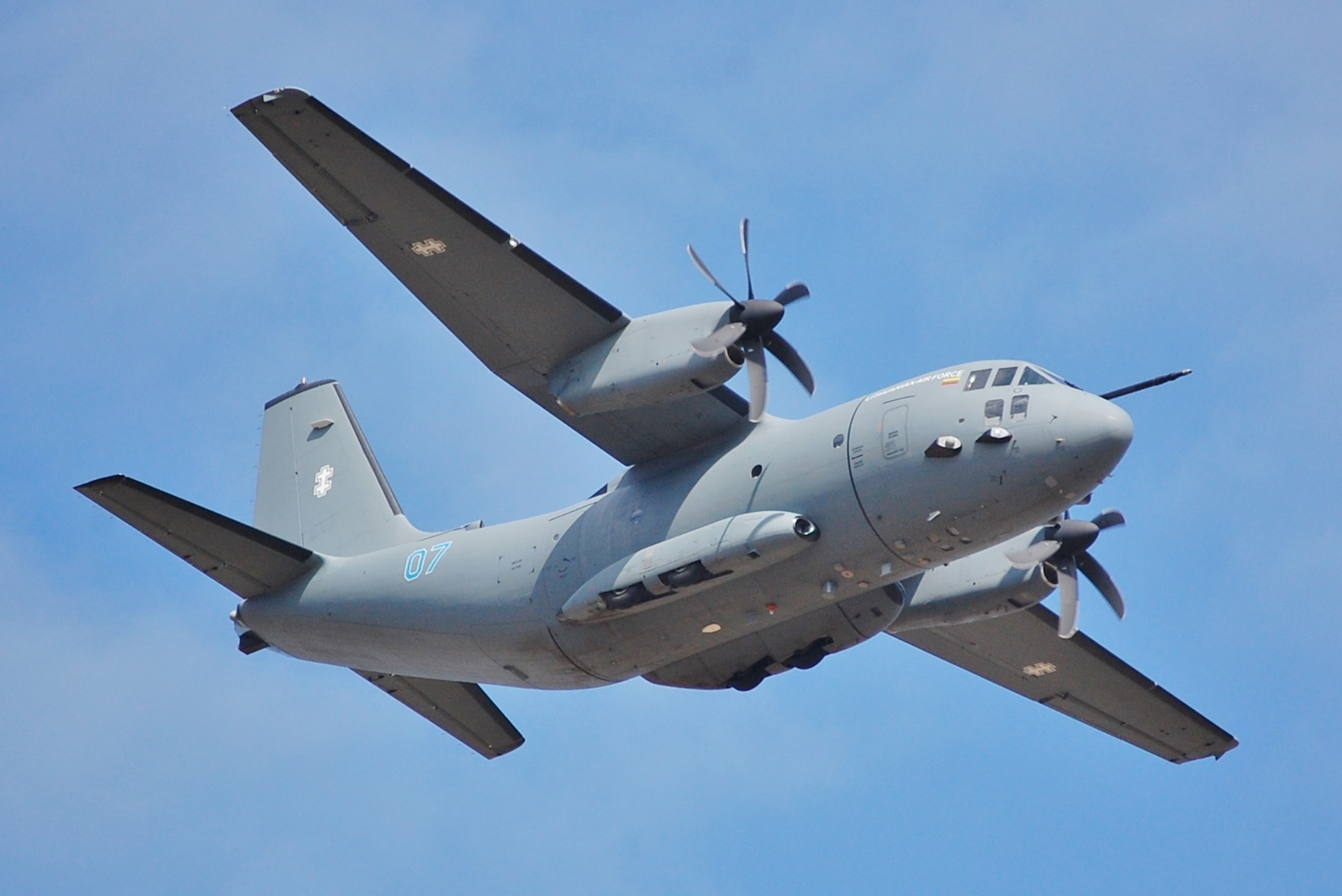
Lithuanian Air Force C-27J with an aerial refueling probe

The main tasks of Armament and Equipment Repair Depot:

- To perform periodical works of maintenance as well as minor and medium repair of LAF armament and equipment outdoors
- To modernize LAF equipment according to contemporary aviation needs and NATO standards
- To prepare technical requirements for organizing competitions of centralized repair, modernization and purchasing of equipment
- To perform periodical works of maintenance, supervision and repair of life-saving equipment used in search and rescue works
- Under necessity, to perform works of maintenance and minor repair of special equipment of NATO partners, performing the function of air police in Lithuania
- Under necessity to provide proper room for ensuring minor repair operations of airplanes (QRA) of NATO partners
- Raise the level of military and professional staff preparation in order to be able in future perform periodic maintenance and repair of western type aircraft

== Baltic Air Policing ==
Since Lithuania joined NATO in 2004, its (alongside Latvia's and Estonia's) air space has been protected by NATO. NATO members normally provide four fighter aircraft, based in Lithuania, to police and defend the airspace of the Baltic States. The deployments rotate between NATO members (that started in March 2004 with Belgian Air Component F-16s) and most NATO members that operate fighters have made a deployment to Lithuania.

== Modernisation ==
In line with the set priorities, the Lithuanian Air Force is implementing modernisation plans. In 2000s, the Air Force has bought three new C-27J Spartan military transport aircraft. In 2013, three Eurocopter AS365 Dauphin search and rescue helicopters were ordered from France for roughly €52 million. The deal was financed by the EU and deliveries began in 2015. In October 2020, the Air Force announced the decision to purchase four Sikorsky UH-60 Black Hawk helicopters from the US.

== Inventory ==
=== Current aircraft ===
Aircraft	Image	Origin	Type	Variant	In service / Notes
Transport
Alenia C-27J Spartan		Italy	Transport		3. To be modernised to extend service up to 2036.
Let L-410 Turbolet		Czechoslovakia	Utility aircraft		2
Helicopters
Eurocopter AS365 Dauphin		France	SAR / Utility helicopter	AS365 N3+	3
Mil Mi-8		Russia	Utility helicopter	Mi-8MTV-1	1
Sikorsky UH-60 Black Hawk		United States	Utility helicopter	UH-60M	4 in service. Equipped with M240H machine guns.
UAVs
Boeing Insitu MQ-27 ScanEagle		United States	Surveillance		

Note: Three Boeing C-17 Globemaster IIIs are available through the Heavy Airlift Wing based in Hungary.

=== Weapons ===
Weapon	Image	Origin	Type	Variant	In service	Notes
Air-to-air missile
AIM-9 Sidewinder		United States	Short range	AIM-9X Block II	At least 168	Used with NASAMS.
AIM-120 AMRAAM		United States	Beyond-visual-range missile	AIM-120C-8	At least 36	Used with NASAMS.

=== Retired aircraft ===
Previous aircraft operated by the Air Force consisted of the Aero L-39, An-2 Colt, An-26 Curl, PZL-104 Wilga, Mi-8/Mi-17 and Mil Mi-2.

== Ranks and insignia ==
=== Officers ===
The rank insignia for commissioned officers for the air force.

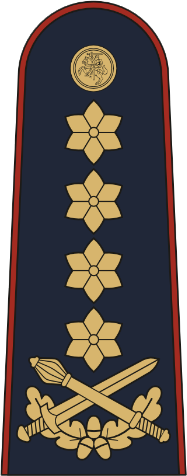
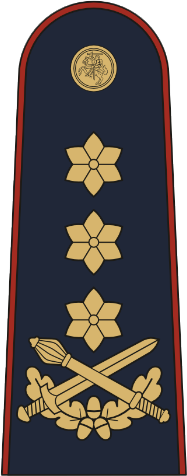
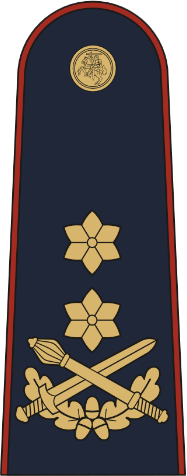
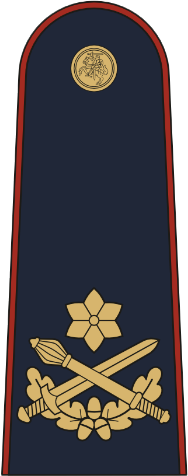
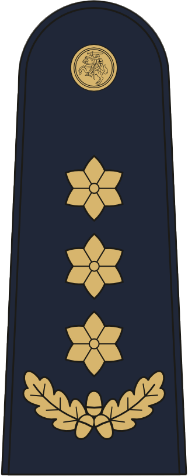
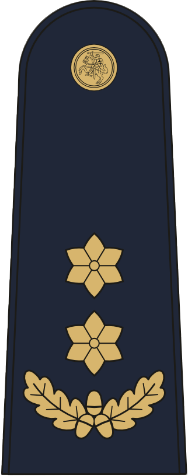
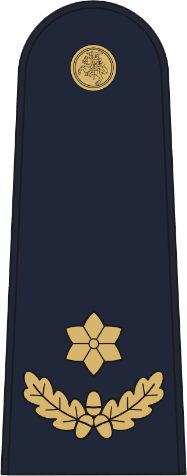
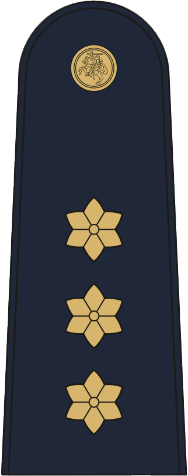
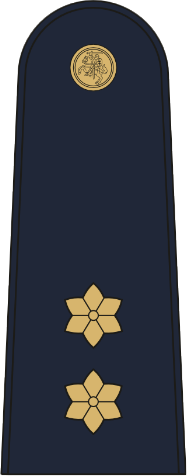
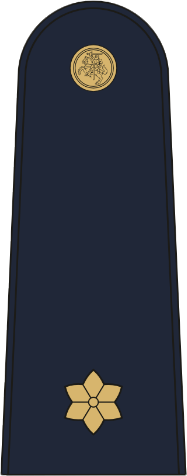
NATO code	OF-10	OF-9	OF-8	OF-7	OF-6	OF-5	OF-4	OF-3	OF-2	OF-1
		General officers (Generolai)				Senior officers (Vyresnieji karininkai)			Junior officers (Jaunesnieji karininkai)
Lithuanian Air Force
Lithuanian Air Force		Generolas	Generolas leitenantas	Generolas majoras	Brigados generolas	Pulkininkas	Pulkininkas leitenantas	Majoras	Kapitonas	Vyresnysis leitenantas	Leitenantas
Limitation (as of 2012)		< 9				< 30	< 127	< 375	N/A
NATO code	OF-10	OF-9	OF-8	OF-7	OF-6	OF-5	OF-4	OF-3	OF-2	OF-1

=== Enlisted ===
The rank insignia for enlisted personnel for the air force.

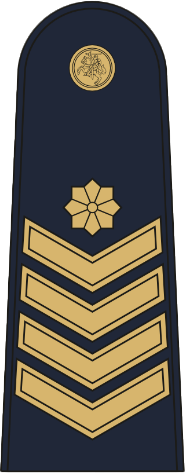
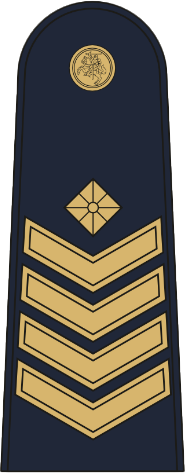
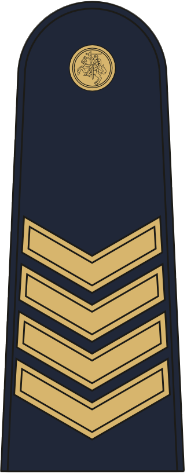
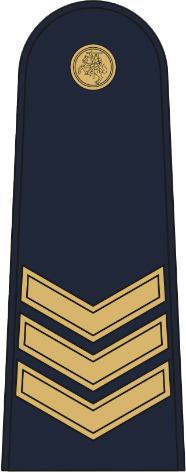
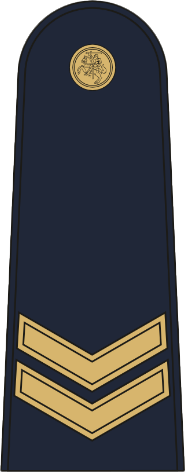
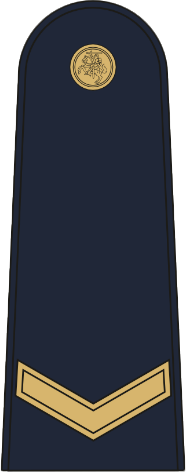
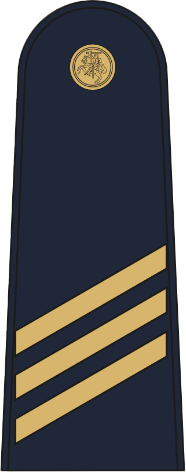
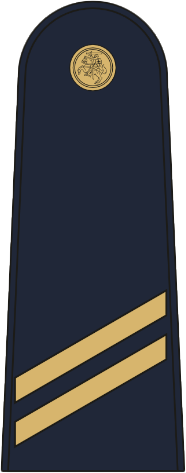
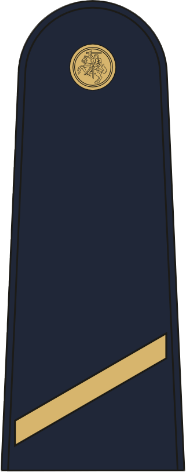
NATO code	OR-9	OR-8	OR-7	OR-6	OR-5	OR-4	OR-3	OR-2	OR-1
Lithuanian Air Force
Lithuanian Air Force	Seržantas majoras	Viršila	Štabo seržantas	Vyresnysis seržantas	Seržantas	Grandinis	Vyresnysis eilinis	Eilinis	Jaunesnysis eilinis
NATO code	OR-9	OR-8	OR-7	OR-6	OR-5	OR-4	OR-3	OR-2	OR-1

== See also ==
- Baltic Air Policing
- Air defence battalion
- Airspace Surveillance and Control Command
- Aviation Unit of State Border Guard Service
- List of airports in Lithuania
