= Karo aviacijos tiekimo skyrius =

Lithuanian aircraft manufacturer

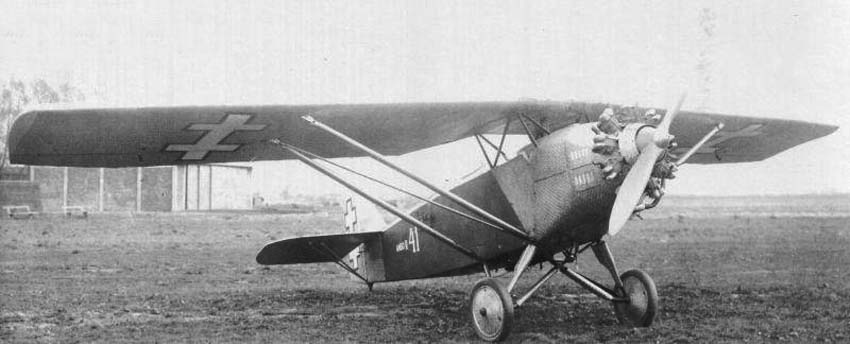
ANBO III is the first Lithuanian serial plane

Karo Aviacijos Tiekimo Skyrius (lit. 'Military Aviation Supply Department') was the Army Aviation Workshops of Lithuania, established at Kaunas. The facility was considerably modernized under the leadership of Antanas Gustaitis, who also designed a variety of aircraft to be built there in small series in the 1920s and 1930s under the designation ANBO.

== Aircraft ==
- ANBO I
- ANBO II
- ANBO III
- ANBO IV
- ANBO V
- ANBO VI
- ANBO VIII

== Sources ==
- Gunston, Bill (1993). World Encyclopedia of Aircraft Manufacturers. Annapolis: Naval Institute Press. p. 166.
