= ANBO III =

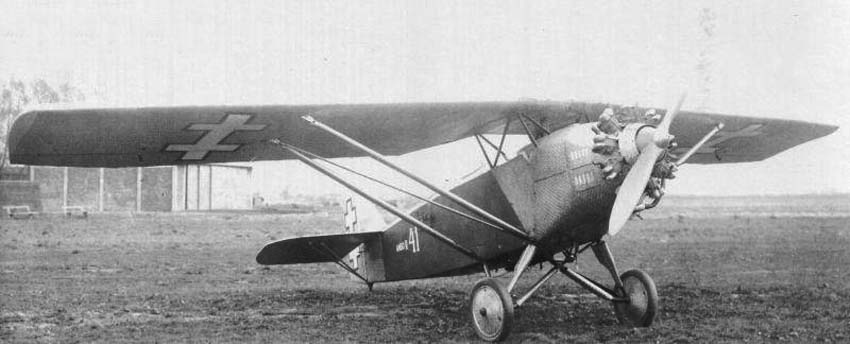
- ANBO III with Walter Mars engine

General information
- Type: Military advanced trainer aircraft
- Manufacturer: Karo Aviacijos Tiekimo Skyrius
- Designer: Antanas Gustaitis
- Number built: 9

History
- First flight: 1929
- Developed from: ANBO II
- Developed into: ANBO IV

The ANBO III was a parasol-wing monoplane training and utility aircraft designed for the Lithuanian Army in 1929. It became the first aircraft of Lithuanian design to be built in series, with two batches of four aircraft produced in 1930 and 1931. The ANBO IIIs also saw service as reconnaissance machines.

== Development & Production ==
Production aircraft began rolling off the line in the autumn of 1930, starting with Number 39 (39 is a designation, it was not the 39th production aircraft) in August, which passed tests on September 9, being flown by Gustaitis himself. Three more were completed by October, 1931. The second series, starting in the spring of 1931 incorporated the following changes: fuselage lengthened by 1/2 meter, larger fuel tanks installed, and turning rudders installed on all except Number 33 & Number 40.

In early 1931 the ANBO III was flying with a 108 kW (145 hp) Walter Mars I, a nine-cylinder radial engine. The Czech-built engines started showing signs of failure after fewer than 200 hours, so British engines were procured. One Armstrong Siddeley Mongoose was ordered and tested on Number 48. This was the same weight as the Mars I and proved reliable so 4 more were ordered between 1934 and 1935. Six Armstrong Siddeley Genet Major were ordered for the ANBO V.

== Operators ==
Lithuania

- Lithuanian Air Force

== Specifications (Walter Mars I engine) ==
Data from Les Ailes April 1931

General characteristics

- Crew: Two
- Length: 6.90 m (22 ft 8 in)
- Wingspan: 10.55 m (34 ft 7 in)
- Height: 2.64 m (8 ft 8 in)
- Wing area: 18.20 m^{2} (195.9 sq ft)
- Empty weight: 580 kg (1,279 lb)
- Gross weight: 880 kg (1,940 lb)
- Powerplant: 1 × Walter Mars I 9-cylinder radial, 108 kW (145 hp) at 1,800 rpm
- Propellers: 2-bladed

Performance

- Maximum speed: 185 km/h (115 mph, 100 kn) at ground level
- Endurance: 4 hr
- Service ceiling: 4,800 m (15,700 ft) service
- Time to altitude: 12 min to 2,000 m (6,600 ft)
