= Pociūnai =

Village in Šiauliai County, Lithuania

- Village
- Location in Lithuania
- Coordinates: 55°47′10″N 23°56′31″E
- Country: Lithuania
- County: Šiauliai
- Municipality: Radviliškis
- Eldership: Pakalniškiai

Population (2011)
  - Total: 291
- Time zone: UTC+2 (EET)
  - Summer (DST): UTC+3 (EEST)
- Postal code: LT-82004

Pociūnai is a village in the east of Radviliškis district municipality in Šiauliai County, Lithuania. It is located on the A9 Panevėžys–Šiauliai road, 5 km southwest of Smilgiai, near the Smėlytė stream. A Pakalniškių school department, library and post office operate in the village.
