= Cesis Airfield =

Former airfield in Cēsis, Latvia

Cesis Airfield Cēsis Lidlauks
- IATA: none; ICAO: none

Summary
- Airport type: Defunct
- Location: Cēsis Municipality
- Opened: 1937; 89 years ago
- Coordinates: 57°19′41″N 25°18′56″E

Map
- Location of Cesis Airfield shown within Latvia

Runways
Direction	Length		Surface
Direction	ft	m	Surface
03/12		850	Grass

Cesis Airfield, also known as Wenden Airfield, was a DOSAAF airfield located in Cēsis Municipality, Central Vidzeme Upland in Latvia. Today, an aero club occupies the site as a private general aviation airfield.

== History ==
Cesis Airfield was established sometime in 1937. It was located near the Priekuļi agricultural school, next to the Kaku estate. On 26 September 1937, it served as a waypoint during the 1937 Flight Around Latvia competition. On 25 September 1938, an aviation festival was held at Cēsis, however it was unlikely held at the airfield due to its temporary landing ground.

Wenden Airfields I and II

During World War II in 1941, it was captured by the German Army and was used by the Luftwaffe as an operational airfield. The airfield measured 2000 x 2000 meters, while the landing area itself measured 1250 x 350 meters, and aircraft would be parked around the perimeter. Takes off and landing could only be performed along one axis, as one end of the field was a farmhouse and the other end had a ten-metre ditch formed by the Rauna river. Cesis Airfield was known as Wenden II by the Germans. An emergency landing ground designated as Wenden I was established with a natural surface landing ground measuring approximately 350 x 200 meters, and served as a satellite for Wenden II. While units were not permanently based there, aircraft were observed parked around the perimeter. It was used as an occasional practice field by the NSGr. 12. From July to September 1944, it began operating as an important fighter and ground-attack base. On 21 September 1944, the airfield was bombed, destroying 1 aircraft from the Stab I./JG 54. From 22 to 23 September 1944, the German forces began withdrawing from Cēsis, and plowed up the landing ground to prevent use by advancing Soviet forces. On 24 September 1944, the 1st Latvian Aviation Regiment launched an attack at the aerodrome following a bombing assignment on 12 September with PO-2 aircraft. At the time, there was low-hanging rain clouds over the front, and the unit was to return to their airfields and wait for fair weather by regulations. However, the crew instead continued onwards, reaching the airfield and successfully bombing it. One aircraft was hit by German anti-aircraft fire, and the pilot guided the aircraft to a swamp landing site, where they destroyed it afterwards. After two weeks, the unit was reunited with their missing pilot. By October 1944, the airfield was repaired by the Soviets, and began operating as a fighter base for the Soviet Air Forces. The 161st Fighter Aviation Regiment arrived, and stationed up to 48 single-engine and 2 two-engine aircraft by 14 October 1944.

=== Post-war ===
By the 1950s, the airfield was seldomly used by the Soviet Air Forces, although it was still maintained by Air Force personnel billeted in the building of the former Saviesiga Biedriba (Fraternal Society), which previously operated as a hotel and restaurant. It operated as an emergency landing ground and aircraft occasionally flew from the airfield. Cows were also let onto the airfield for grazing. On 13 June 1965, the first aviation festival since the war was held at Cesis Airfield by the DOSAAF. Participating teams arrived from Latvia, Lithuania, Estonia, Leningrad region, Moldova including the city of Chișinău, and Ukraine. Competitions included glider jumpers demonstrating landing skills on targets measuring 20 m diameter for men and 60–100 m for women. Glider pilots also demonstrated loops, aerobatic manoeuvres and simulated combat tasks, while model aircraft enthusiasts demonstrated models designed for flight distance and duration. Buses collected spectators, which ran from the station at 10:00 AM. The Valmiera–Cēsis Aviation Technical Sports Club was based at Cesis Airfield, and organised gliding competitions for the nearby countries. It was managed by club head N. Panov, whom held the title "USSR Sports Master." By 1977, hundreds of flight hours and thousands of kilometres of flight had been recorded. Every autumn, the aerodrome faced a period of inactivity, providing a short break for the club. During this time, the club organised aerodrome inventory and prepared and checked equipment for next year. The aerodrome had also faced technicals storage and maintenance issues due to the lack of a hangar, and the construction of one was planned.

After Latvia gained independence in 1990, the airfield was briefly used by the Zemessardze, and military aviation ceased then. The Vidzemes Aeroklubs moved in, using aircraft such as the Piper Navajo, Antonov An-2, and gliders. In 2004–5, a newer airfield was completed east of Cesis Airfield, and was equipped with two steel hangars. It was built with a grass-sowed, hardened ground surface runway, measuring 850 metres long and 39 meters wide with load-bearing weight of 5700 kg. In 2014, it was certified for daylight visual flights.

== Units ==
The following units that were based at Cesis Airfield:

Luftwaffe (operational units)

- III. Gruppe, Schlachtgeschwader 3, July 1944 — August 1944
- Stab (Staff Headquarters), Schlachtgeschwader 4, August 1944 — September 1944
- I. Gruppe, Schlachtgeschwader 4, August 1944 — September 1944
- II. Gruppe, Schlachtgeschwader 4, August 1944 — September 1944
- III. Gruppe, Schlachtgeschwader 4, August 1944 — September 1944
- II. Gruppe, Jagdgeschwader 54, August 1944 — September 1944
- I. Gruppe, Jagdgeschwader 54, September 1944 — September 1944

Luftwaffe (non-flying units)

- Platzkommando of Flughafen-Kommandantur E(v) 204/I, April 1944
- Flieger-Geräteausgabestelle (Eis.) 52/VII, January 1944

Soviet Air Forces

- 161st Fighter Aviation Regiment, October 1944, equipped with the Lavochkin La-7
- 148th Guards Fighter Aviation Regiment PVO between July 1946 and 1 October 1948, equipped with the Yakovlev Yak-3
