= ANBO VIII =

Aircraft

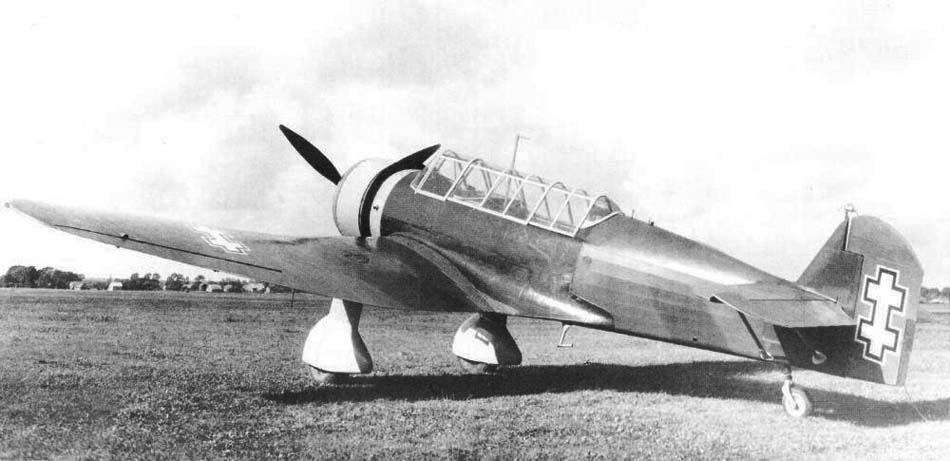

General information
- Type: Bomber-reconnaissance monoplane
- National origin: Lithuania
- Manufacturer: Karo Aviacijos Tiekimo Skyrius
- Designer: Antanas Gustaitis
- Number built: 1

History
- First flight: 5 September 1939

External videos
- Colour footage of the ANBO VIII and Antanas Gustaitis

The ANBO VIII was a Lithuanian bomber-reconnaissance monoplane designed by Antanas Gustaitis and built by Karo Aviacijos Tiekimo Skyrius.

== Design and development ==
The ANBO VIII was a low-wing monoplane with a tailwheel landing gear, an enclosed two-seat tandem cockpit and powered by a 930 hp (694 kW) Bristol Pegasus XVIII radial engine. The prototype and only ANBO VIII was first flown on 5 September 1939 and was still under testing when the country was annexed by the Soviet Union. The prototype was removed by the Soviet authorities for testing.

== Operators ==
- Lithuania

== Specifications ==
Data from Lithuanian Aviation Museum

General characteristics

- Crew: 2
- Length: 9.5 m (31 ft 2 in)
- Wingspan: 13.5 m (44 ft 3 in)
- Wing area: 30 m^{2} (320 sq ft)
- Empty weight: 2,300 kg (5,071 lb)
- Max takeoff weight: 3,700 kg (8,157 lb)
- Powerplant: 1 × Bristol Pegasus XVIII radial piston engine, 690 kW (930 hp)

Performance

- Maximum speed: 411 km/h (255 mph, 222 kn) at 5,000 m (16,000 ft) altitude
- Minimum control speed: 113 km/h (70 mph, 61 kn)
- Service ceiling: 9,000 m (30,000 ft)
- Time to altitude: 2 minutes to 1,000 m (3,300 ft), 15 minutes to 5,000 m (16,000 ft)

Armament

- Guns: 4 × 7.7 mm (0.303 in) fixed forward-firing M1919 Browning machine guns with 500 rpg

- 1 × 7.7 mm (0.303 in) manually aimed M1919 Browning machine gun in the rear cockpit with 5 x 100 round boxes

- Bombs: up to 600 kg (1,300 lb) on a fuselage bomb rack and/or 400 kg (880 lb) under the wings.
