= Antanas Gustaitis =

Lithuanian brigadier general (1898–1941)

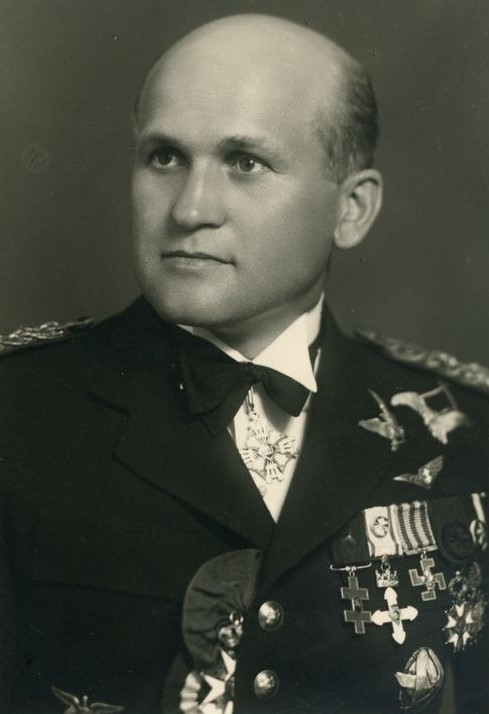
- Gustaitis photographed with uniform of the Lithuanian Air Force and state awards
- Born: 27 March 1898; Obelinė, Javaravas Volost, Marijampolė County, Russian Empire
- Died: October 16, 1941 (aged 43); Moscow, Soviet Union
- Burial place: Unknown
- Education: Petrograd Institute of Transportation Engineering (1916); Konstantinovsky Artillery School (1917), Lithuanian School of Military Aviation (1919); Institut supérieur de l'aéronautique et de l'espace (1928)
- Military career
- Allegiance: Lithuanian Armed Forces (1919–1940)
- Service years: 1919–1940
- Rank: Brigadier General
- Awards: Commander's Cross of the Order of the Cross of Vytis (1927); Officer's Cross of the Order of Vytautas the Great (1930); Officer's Order of the Crown of Italy (1930); Commander's Order of the Crown of Italy (1934); Commander's Cross of the Order of the Lithuanian Grand Duke Gediminas (1934); Commander's Cross of the Order of Vytautas the Great (1939); Officer's Order of the Legion of Honour(1935); Commander's Order of Vasa(1935); Czechoslovak 4th degree with swords Order of the White Eagle (1935); Grand Officer's Order of the Three Stars (1938)

Antanas Gustaitis (March 26, 1898 – October 16, 1941) was a Brigadier General in the Lithuanian Armed Forces who modernized the Lithuanian Air Force, which at that time was part of the Lithuanian Army. He was the architect or aeronautical engineer who undertook the task to design and construct several military trainers and reconnaissance aircraft.

== Early life ==
Gustaitis was born in the village of Obelinė, in Javaravas county, in the Marijampolė district. He attended high school in Yaroslavl, and from there studied at the Institute of Engineering and School of Artillery in Petrograd.

== Lithuanian Wars of Independence and the Interwar ==
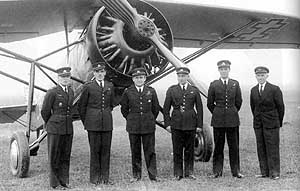
Romualdas Marcinkus, Jonas Liorentas, Gustaitis, Juozas Namikas, Jonas Mikėnas, Kazys Rimkevičius standing in front of an ANBO aircraft

Gustaitis at a Lithuanian airfield

After joining the Lithuanian Army in 1919, he graduated from the School of Military Aviation as a Junior Lieutenant in 1920. Later that year, he saw action in the Polish-Lithuanian War. By 1922 he began to train pilots, and later became the head of the training squadron. He also oversaw the construction of aircraft for Lithuania in Italy and Czechoslovakia. Gustaitis was one of the founding members of the Aero Club of Lithuania, and later its Vice-President. He did much to promote aviation among the young people in Lithuania, especially concerning the sport of gliding. He also won the Lithuanian Chess Championship in 1922.

Between 1925 and 1928, Gustaitis studied aeronautical engineering in Paris. After his graduation he returned to Lithuania, and was promoted to deputy Commander-in-Chief of Military Aviation and made chief of the Aviation Workshop (Karo Aviacijos Tiekimo Skyrius) in Kaunas. During this time, he reorganized the workshop and expanded its capability to repair aircraft as well. The aircraft he designed were named ANBO, an acronym for Antanas Bronė, he and his wife's first names. A common misconception is Antanas Nori Būti Ore which means "Antanas wants to be in the air" in Lithuanian.

In 1934, he became Commander-in-Chief of the air branch, and in 1937, attained the rank of Brigadier General. He reorganized Lithuanian military aviation, forming fighter, bomber, and reconnaissance groups, and developed a system of training for pilots and their crews, and ground crews as well.

== World War II and Soviet occupation ==
After Lithuania's occupation by the Soviet Union and the dissolution of the Lithuanian Army, he was a lecturer at Vytautas Magnus University, but fearing arrest he attempted to flee to Germany in 1941. He was caught attempting to cross the border on 4 March, arrested, and taken to Moscow, where he was shot on 16 October of that year.

== Legacy ==
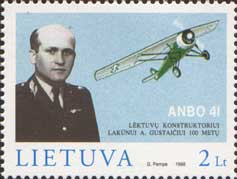
Lithuanian post stamp (1998)

Following the restoration of Lithuanian independence he was commemorated by Vilnius Gediminas Technical University when the Antanas Gustaitis Aviation Institute was named after him.

== Aircraft ==
Summary of aircraft designed by Gustaitis
Model name	First flight	Number built	Type
ANBO I	1925	1	Military trainer aircraft
ANBO II	1927	1	Military trainer aircraft
ANBO III	1929	9	Military trainer/utility aircraft
ANBO IV & 41	1932	34	Military reconnaissance/light attack aircraft
ANBO V & 51	1931	15	Military trainer aircraft
ANBO VI	1933	4	Military trainer aircraft
ANBO VII			
ANBO VIII	1939	1	Light bomber
