= ANBO IV =

Lithuanian reconnaissance aircraft

Anbo IV
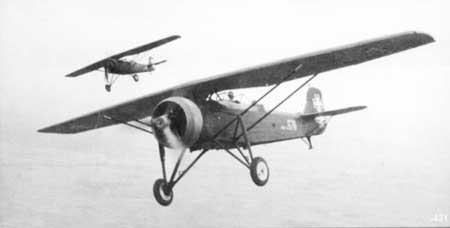
- ANBO-41 variant

General information
- Type: Reconnaissance aircraft
- Manufacturer: Karo Aviacijos Tiekimo Skyrius
- Designer: Antanas Gustaitis
- Number built: 14 ANBO IV, 20 ANBO 41

History
- Introduction date: 1934
- First flight: 14 July 1932
- Retired: 1940 (Lithuania)
- Developed from: ANBO III

External videos
- Lithuanian Air Force in 1939

The ANBO IV was a reconnaissance aircraft used by the Lithuanian Air Force in World War II, designed by Lithuanian aircraft designer Antanas Gustaitis. The Lithuanian ANBO 41 was far ahead of the most modern foreign reconnaissance aircraft of that time in structural features, and most importantly in speed and in climb rate. All ANBO 41 aircraft were likely destroyed during World War II.

== Development ==
The ANBO IV was developed from the ANBO III trainer. The design was supervised by Colonel Antanas Gustaitis. The first flight took place on 14 July 1932, the prototype being powered by a Wasp engine. After successful trials, series production began. Thirteen series-built aircraft were powered by British Bristol Pegasus engines and were manufactured by Lithuanian Aircraft State Factory. It could be armed with two pairs of light machine guns and could carry 200 kg of bombs.

== Operational history ==
ANBO IVs were introduced into Lithuanian Air Force in 1934 and shortly before that a few aircraft made demonstration flights in a few European countries: France, United Kingdom, Soviet Union and most Scandinavian countries. Between 25 June and 29 July 1934, three aircraft commanded by colonel Gustaitis flew 10,000 km (6,200 mi) route.

ANBO IV and ANBO 41 aircraft equipped one and two reconnaissance squadrons respectively in Lithuanian Air Force, at the time of the Soviet occupation of the Baltic states in the summer of 1940.

A photo exists showing that at least one Anbo IV or Anbo 41 survived this period and was operated by the Luftwaffe during the German occupation.

== Variants ==
ANBO IV
Designation of prototype and 13 serial-built aircraft used for night and day reconnaissance.
ANBO 41
Second production version with more powerful engine and three-blade wooden propeller. It was then the only aircraft in Europe to employ a wooden three-blade propeller.

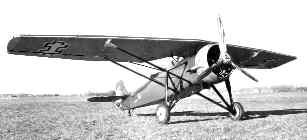
ANBO-41 No.671 of the first serial production in Kaunas (1937)

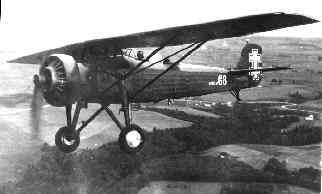
ANBO-IVM of the second series (1935)

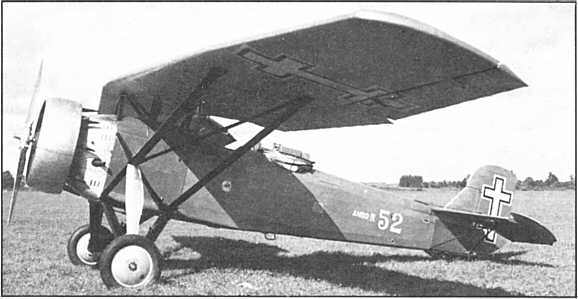
ANBO IV in an aerodrome

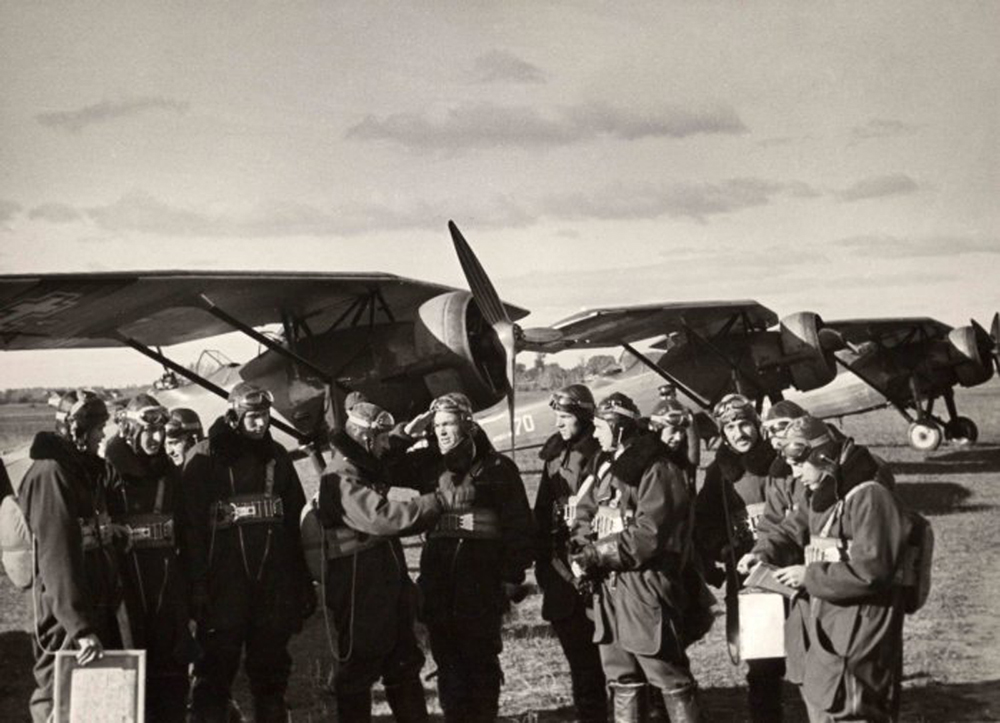
Three ANBO-41s

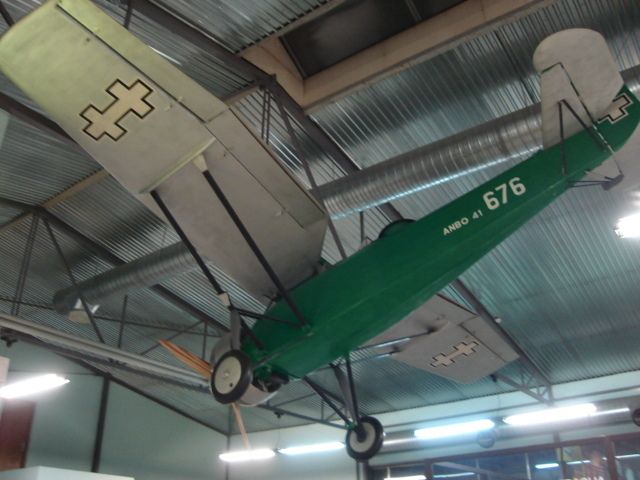
ANBO 41 replica as found at Kaunas Aerodrome

== Operators ==
Lithuania

- Lithuanian Air Force

Soviet Union

- Soviet Air Force incorporated Lithuanian units with equipment and personnel.

Germany

- Luftwaffe used at least one Anbo 41 captured from the Soviet Air Force for training and liaison purposes in 1941–1942.

== Specifications (ANBO 41) ==
Data from Monografie: ANBO-IV, ANBO-41

General characteristics

- Crew: two, pilot and observer
- Length: 8.80 m (28 ft 10 in)
- Wingspan: 13.20 m (43 ft 4 in)
- Height: 3.30 m (10 ft 10 in)
- Wing area: 29.0 m^{2} (312 sq ft)
- Empty weight: 1,600 kg (3,527 lb)
- Gross weight: 2,350 kg (5,181 lb)
- Powerplant: 1 × Bristol Pegasus XI , 676 kW (907 hp)

Performance

- Maximum speed: 360 km/h (220 mph, 190 kn)
- Cruise speed: 300 km/h (190 mph, 160 kn)
- Stall speed: 100 km/h (62 mph, 54 kn)
- Range: 1,000 km (620 mi, 540 nmi)
- Service ceiling: 9,000 m (30,000 ft)
- Time to altitude: 9 minutes to 5,000 m (16,000 ft)

Armament

- 2 × fixed, forward-firing 7.9 mm machine guns
- 2 × flexible machine guns for observer
- Up to 200 kg (440 lb) of bombs

== See also ==
- Antanas Gustaitis
- Lithuanian Air Force
