= ANBO V =

Lithuanian training plane

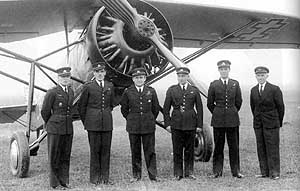
- ANBO - 51

General information
- Type: Military trainer
- Manufacturer: Karo Aviacijos Tiekimo Skyrius
- Designer: Antanas Gustaitis
- Number built: 5 (Anbo V); 10 (Anbo 51)

History
- First flight: 1931

The ANBO V was a parasol wing monoplane training aircraft designed for the Lithuanian Army in 1931. A developed version, the ANBO 51 followed in 1936 and 1938.

== Design ==
The ANBO V was of conventional configuration with fixed, tailwheel undercarriage. The pilot and instructor sat in tandem open cockpits. The prototype was powered by a Walter Vega I engine, but the small series produced had either Walter Venus or Armstrong Siddeley Genet Major engines.

In 1936, an improved version appeared, designated ANBO 51, which was Genet-powered and featured strengthened wings.

The ANBO 51 was a fabric covered aircraft with a welded steel tube fuselage structure and steel framed rudder and elevators. The parasol wings were attached to the lower fuselage with pairs of struts on each side, assisted by further centre section struts. The wings and fixed tail surfaces were wooden structures.

== Operators ==
Lithuania

- Lithuanian Air Force

== Specifications (ANBO 51) ==
Data from Jane's All the World's Aircraft 1938

General characteristics

- Crew: two, pilot and instructor
- Length: 7.30 m (23 ft 11 in)
- Wingspan: 11.35 m (37 ft 3 in)
- Height: 2.82 m (9 ft 3 in)
- Wing area: 20.65 m^{2} (222 sq ft)
- Empty weight: 650 kg (1,430 lb)
- Gross weight: 950 kg (2,090 lb)
- Powerplant: 1 × Armstrong Siddeley Genet Major IV , 120 kW (160 hp)

Performance

- Maximum speed: 210 km/h (130 mph, 110 kn)
- Rate of climb: 4.2 m/s (15 ft/min) to 2,000 m (6,560 ft)

== Bibliography ==
- Taylor, Michael J. H. (1989). Jane's Encyclopedia of Aviation. London: Studio Editions.
- Ramoška, Gytis, Numylėtas anbukas, Plieno Sparnai Nr. 8 2006 m., https://www.plienosparnai.lt/page.php?28
