= AN/TWQ-1 Avenger =

Military self-propelled surface-to-air missile system

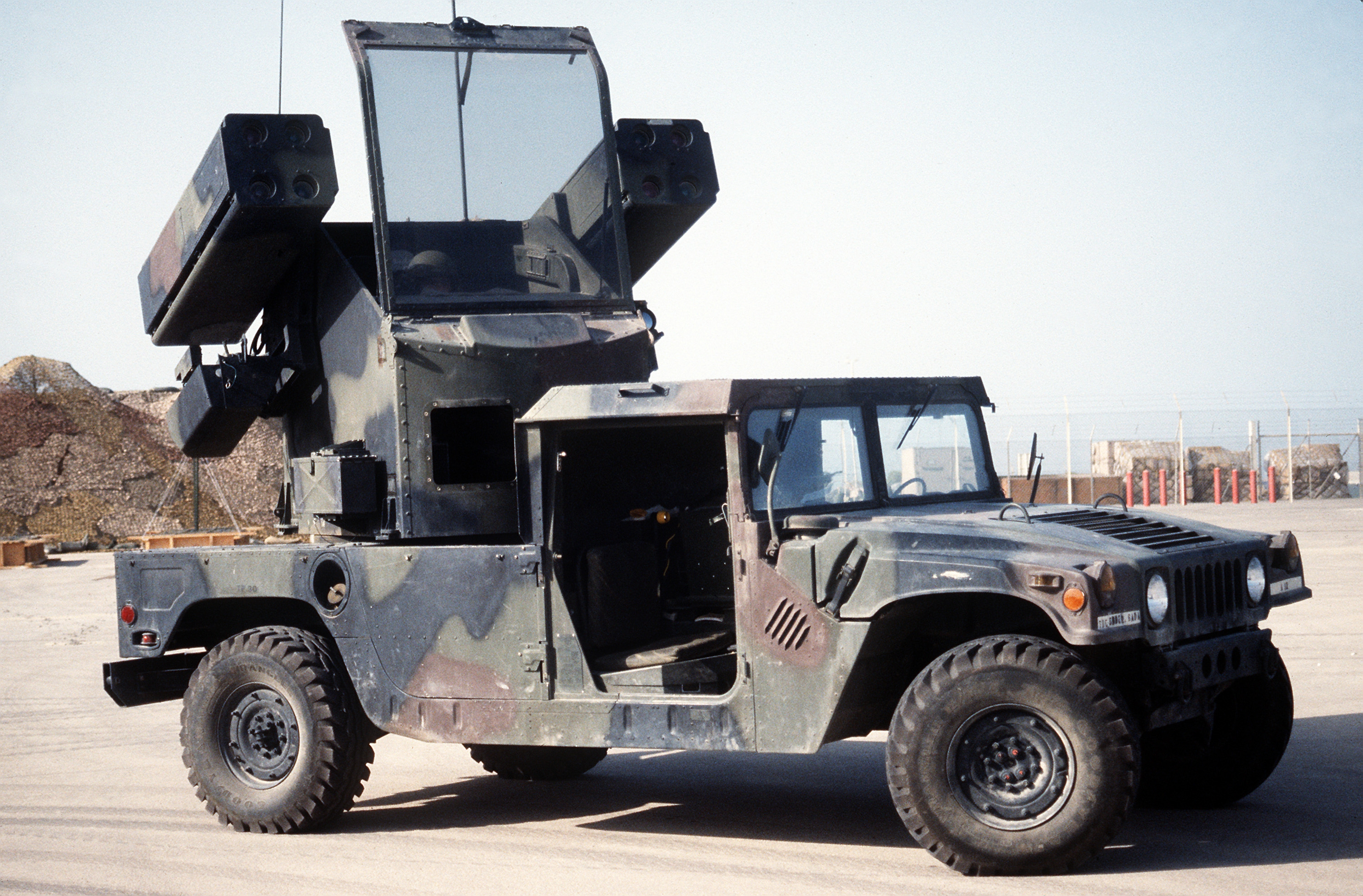
- Avenger air defense missile system
- Type: Hybrid mobile surface-to-air missile launcher system and self-propelled anti-aircraft gun
- Place of origin: United States

Service history
- In service: 1989–present
- Used by: Lithuanian Air Defense Battalion, United States Army, United States Marine Corps, Ukrainian Military

Production history
- Manufacturer: Boeing
- Produced: 1980s–present
- No. built: Over 1,100 by 2002

Specifications
- Mass: 8,600 pounds (3,900 kg)
- Length: 16 feet 3 inches (4.95 m)
- Width: 7 feet 2 inches (2.18 m)
- Height: 8 feet 8 inches (2.64 m)
- Crew: 2 (Basic), 3 (STC)
- Main armament: 4/8 FIM-92 Stinger missiles
- Secondary armament: .50 FN M3P machine gun
- Engine: Detroit Diesel water cooled V-8; 135 horsepower (101 kW)
- Operational range: 275 miles (443 km)
- Maximum speed: 55 miles per hour (89 km/h) (launcher); Mach 2.2 (effector)

The AN/TWQ-1 Avenger Air Defense System is an American self-propelled surface-to-air missile system that provides mobile, short-range air defense protection for ground units against cruise missiles, unmanned aerial vehicles, low-flying fixed-wing aircraft, and helicopters.

The Avenger was originally developed for the United States Armed Forces; it is currently used by the U.S. Army and previously by the U.S. Marine Corps.

In accordance with the Joint Electronics Type Designation System (JETDS), the "AN/TWQ-1" designation represents the first design of an Army–Navy electronic device for ground transportable armament special combination equipment. The JETDS system is now used to also name all Department of Defense and some NATO electronic systems.

== History ==
Originally developed as a private venture by Boeing in the 1980s, the Avenger was developed over a period of only 10 months from initial concept to delivery for testing to the U.S. Army. Initial testing was conducted in May 1984 at the Army's Yakima Training Center in the U.S. state of Washington. During testing three FIM-92 Stinger missiles were fired. During the first test firing, in April 1984, the system achieved a direct hit while the Avenger was moving at 20 miles per hour (32 km/h).

The second test firing, conducted at night while stationary, also achieved a direct hit. The third test firing, conducted while on the move and in the rain, did not achieve a direct hit, but did pass within the missile's kill range, so the shot was scored as a tactical kill. All three test shots were conducted by operators who had never fired the missile before.

In August 1987, the U.S. Army awarded Boeing the first production contract for 325 units. On 1 November 1988, the first unit was delivered. In 1989, the system began its Initial Operational Test and Evaluation (IOT&E) series of tests. The tests were conducted in two stages with Stage 1 consisting of acquisition and tracking trials at Fort Hunter Liggett, California, and Stage 2 consisting of live-fire testing at White Sands Missile Range, New Mexico. In February 1990, the Avenger system was deemed operationally effective and began replacing the M163 and M167 VADS. Two variants were deployed based on the Humvee chassis: M998 HMMWV Avenger and M1097 Heavy HMMWV Avenger.

By January 1997, the Army had received over 900 units of the Avenger system.

The first operational deployment of the system occurred during the buildup for the Persian Gulf War. With the success of this deployment, the U.S. Army signed an additional contract for another 679 vehicles, bringing the total order to 1,004 units. The Avenger was again deployed in support of NATO operations during the Bosnian War. The Avenger system received widespread public exposure when it was placed around the Pentagon during the first anniversary of the September 11 attacks of 2001. The Avenger was also deployed during the U.S. military's operations in Afghanistan and Iraq.

In 2004, the U.S. Army had 26 battalions with Avenger Short-Range Air Defense (SHORAD) capabilities, but prioritization of other weapon systems during operations in Afghanistan and Iraq caused that number to drop to nine by early 2017, of which two were within the active force and seven were in the Army National Guard. Of the over 1,100 Avengers built only about 400 remain in service. In March 2018, in response to renewed Russian aggression since the 2014 annexation of Crimea, the 678th Air Defense Artillery Brigade deployed to Europe, the first time an American air defense unit had been sent there since the Cold War. The Army plans to deploy 72 Avenger sets to support U.S. European Command.

During protests regarding the Dakota Access Pipeline near Standing Rock, the North Dakota National Guard deployed an Avenger system as an observation platform. It was employed for over a month to observe areas within Morton County where numerous instances of criminal trespass and mischief had occurred. The unarmed Avenger was used to support public safety in southern Morton County. The Avenger system was removed in order to deescalate any tensions its presence may have caused.

In April 2017, an Avenger fired Stingers at two UAVs in a test on Eglin Air Force Base, marking the missile's first interception of a UAV target. While Stingers are usually loaded with direct impact warheads for use against aircraft and cruise missiles, these were equipped with proximity fuzes that enabled them to detonate near the target, giving them the ability to destroy small UAVs. Since small UAVs do not produce large heat signatures, the Avenger uses a laser rangefinder in combination with an antenna on the warhead to direct the missile on target. The Stingers shot down an MQM-170C Outlaw and a smaller, unidentified system, demonstrating the fuze's ability to detect and destroy moving mini-drones weighing as little as 2–20 kg (4.4–44.1 lb).

On 30 September 2020, the U.S. Army awarded General Dynamics a contract to deliver the Interim Maneuver SHORAD (IM-SHORAD), a Stryker armored vehicle fitted with heavier weapons to replace the outdated, unarmored, and undergunned Avenger Humvee.

In November 2022, four Avenger air defense systems were included as part of a $400 million military aid package supporting Ukraine during the Russian invasion of Ukraine to defend critical civilian infrastructure against cruise missile and Iranian-made Shahed-136 lethal drone attacks which were launched by Russia in October 2022. Another eight were included in a package in January 2023. The first arrived in Europe in early February and were seen in service by late March. Ukraine has received in total some 20 units, as of September 2024, with the crews being trained in Europe by United States instructors.

== Overview ==
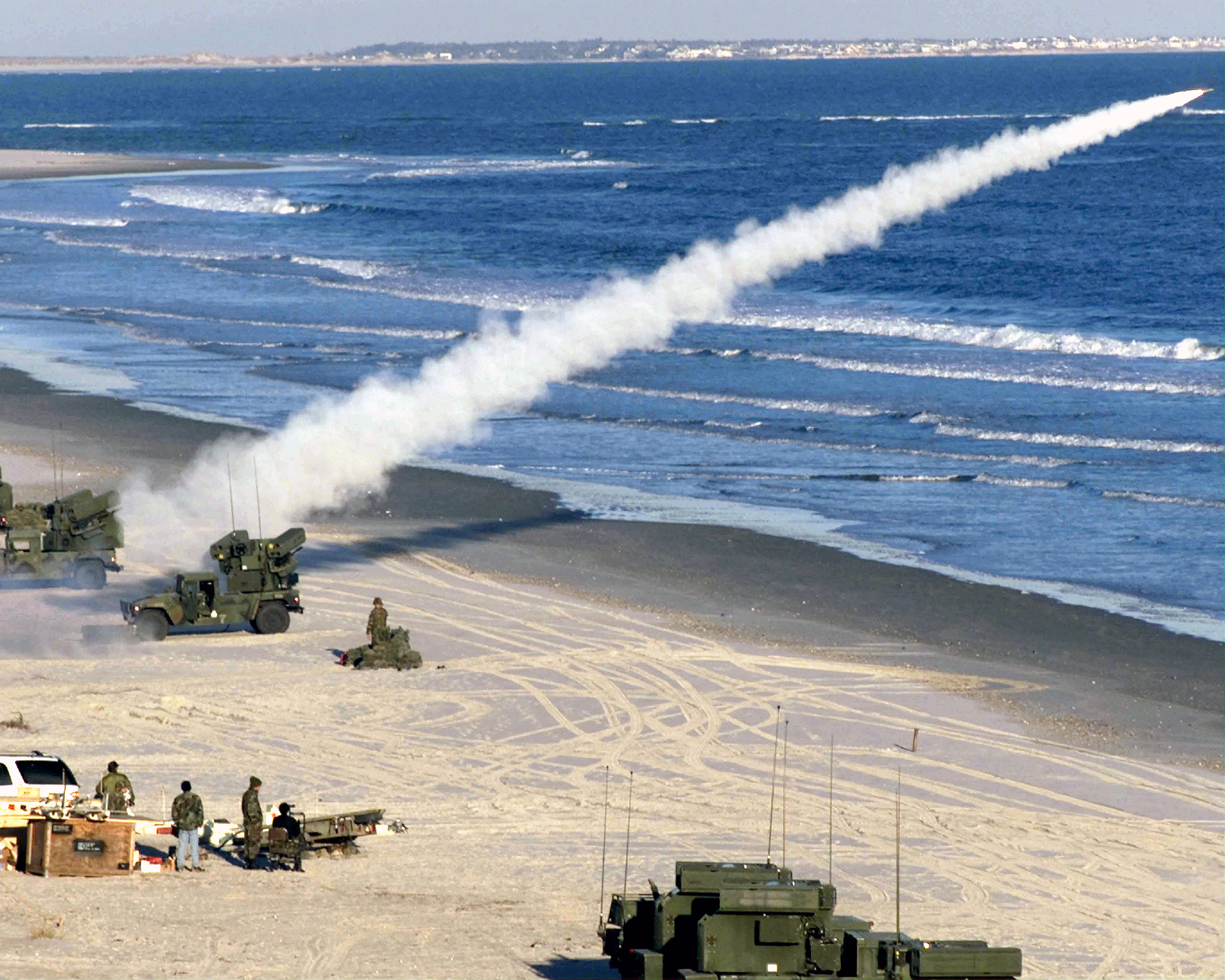
A Stinger missile being launched from an Avenger platform at Onslow Beach, North Carolina, in April 2000.

The Avenger comes mainly in three configurations, the Basic, Slew-to-Cue, and the Up-Gun.

The Basic configuration consists of a gyro-stabilized air defense turret mounted on a modified heavy Humvee. The turret has two Stinger missile launcher pods, each capable of firing up to 4 fire-and-forget infrared/ultraviolet guided missiles in rapid succession. The Avenger can be linked to the Forward Area Air Defense Command, Control, Communications and Intelligence (FAAD C3I) system, which permits external radar tracks and messages to be passed to the fire unit to alert and cue the gunner.

The Slew-to-Cue (STC) subsystem allows the commander or gunner to select a FAAD C3I reported target for engagement from a display on a Targeting Console developed from VT Miltope's Pony PCU. Once the target has been selected, the turret can be automatically slewed directly to the target with limited interaction by the gunner.

The Up-Gun Avenger was developed specifically for the 3rd Armored Cavalry Regiment for the Regiment's 2005 deployment to Iraq. The modification was designed to allow the Avenger to perform unit and asset defense in addition to its air defense mission. The right missile pod was removed and the M3P 12.7 mm (.50) cal machine gun was moved to the pod's former position. This allowed for the removal of the turret's cab safety limits which enabled the gun to be fired directly in front of the HMMWV. Eight of the unit's Avengers were modified to this configuration. With the 3rd ACR's redeployment from Iraq, the Up-Gun Avenger completed its role in Operation Iraqi Freedom and the Avengers have been scheduled to be converted back to STC systems.

== Variants ==
=== Boeing/Shorts Starstreak Avenger ===
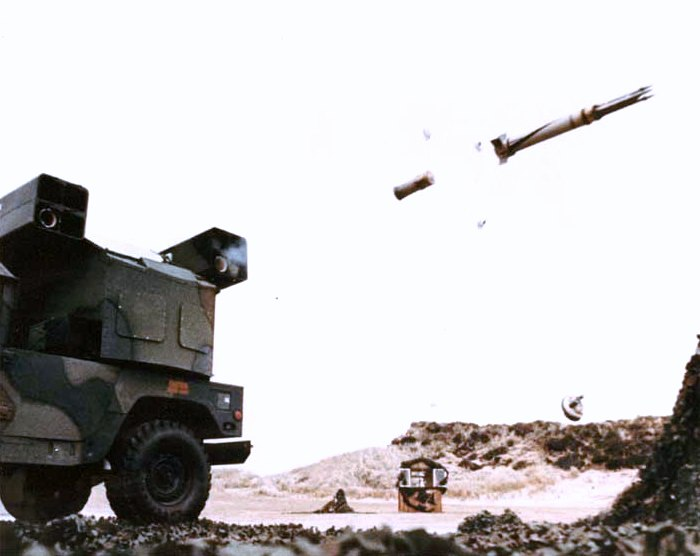
M1097 Avenger launching Starstreak missile

Boeing teamed with Shorts Brothers PLC (now part of Thales) to offer an Avenger system in which one Stinger pod was replaced with a pod of four Starstreak Hyper-velocity laser-guided missiles, in the hopes of attracting a U.S. Army contract under the Forward Area Air Defense System Line-of-Sight Rear (FAADS-LOS-R) program. Test installation was carried out in mid-1990 and firing trials followed from mid-1991 in the U.K. Starstreak would have complemented the Stinger by improving the overall systems ability to deal with low hovering helicopters which frequently do not provide enough contrast for lock-on by infrared guided missiles. Starstreak also has the ability to be used against un-armored and lightly armored ground vehicles.

=== Boeing/Matra Guardian ===
In the 1990s Boeing teamed with Matra of France to offer the Avenger modified by the substitution of standard triple launcher boxes for Matra Mistral missiles in place of the quadruple Stinger pods of the standard Avenger. One demonstrator vehicle was built in 1992 and test firings took place in France. The project was dropped around 1997.

=== Avengers during the Iraq War ===
Due to the lack of serious airborne threats during much of the Iraq War, along with the pressing need for ground assets for combat roles such as convoy protection, the Avenger was pressed into this role. The FLIR/laser rangefinder combined with the 12.7 mm (.50) cal machine gun has proved to be very effective, but was limited by no-fire zones, particularly to the front of the vehicle. A program was instituted to remove one of the missile pods and move the machine gun to that position to enable a 360° field of fire. The upgrade also increased the ammunition capacity to 650 rounds.

=== Avenger DEW ===
Another potential variant proposed by Boeing is an Avenger with a Directed Energy Weapon (DEW). Boeing completed an initial test of a 1 kW laser mounted where the right missile pod would be. The M3P 12.7 mm (.50) cal has been replaced by the M242 Bushmaster as its close defense weapon.

=== Avenger Multi-Role Weapon System ===
Test firing demonstrations of this variant took place in 2004. It is modified by re-locating the M3P machine gun over the turret cab to allow a 360-degree field of fire, increasing ready-use machine gun ammunition stowage to 600 rounds, and providing the option to substitute launchers for 2 FGM-148 Javelin missiles in place of 1 Stinger pod.

=== Accelerated Improved Interceptor Initiative (AI3) ===
In February 2012, Raytheon was awarded a contract to develop the AI3, a modified AIM-9 Sidewinder missile mounted on the Avenger launcher, to perform counter rocket, artillery, mortar (C-RAM), counter unmanned aerial vehicle (C-UAV), and counter cruise missile duties.

In 2013, the US Army decided to not buy the system.

In August 2014, the system successfully intercepted a UAV and cruise missile target featuring a semi-active radar homing seeker in a test.

=== Other variants ===
Boeing have proposed that the Avenger PMS turret could be mounted on other vehicles such as Unimog truck, BV-206 all-terrain vehicles, M113 APC, and M548 tracked cargo carrier as well as being used as a stationary ground mount on a pallet for defense of static targets. The Avenger PMS has been demonstrated with a mock-up of two 70 mm helicopter-type rocket pods carrying a total of 36 rockets to give the system greater multi-mission utility. Other missiles such as the Bofors RBS 70/Bolide have been proposed for use on the Avenger PMS.

In March 2017, Boeing revealed a modernized Avenger system fitted with AIM-9X Sidewinder and Longbow Hellfire missiles on the sides and a directed energy weapon affixed to the top. It is also planned to be integrated onto other platforms including the JLTV, Stryker, and Bradley Fighting Vehicle. While Boeing had configured a Stryker with the Avenger turret to fulfill the Army's Interim Maneuver-Short-Range Air Defense (IM-SHORAD) requirement, the Army ultimately decided against the idea, feeling it would require major modifications to the vehicle and because of the company's desire for the service to supply the turrets, of which there were a limited amount existing readily in the inventory.

During a 2017 joint French-Egyptian naval exercise, an AN/TWQ-1 Avenger was mounted onto the helicopter flight deck of a Mistral-class amphibious assault ship to provide ad-hoc close-range air defense. The ship was originally slated to be sold to Russia, but the sale was canceled due to international sanctions imposed on Russia following the Annexation of Crimea. The ship was sold to the Egyptian navy without the originally planned Russian air defense systems.

== Specifications ==
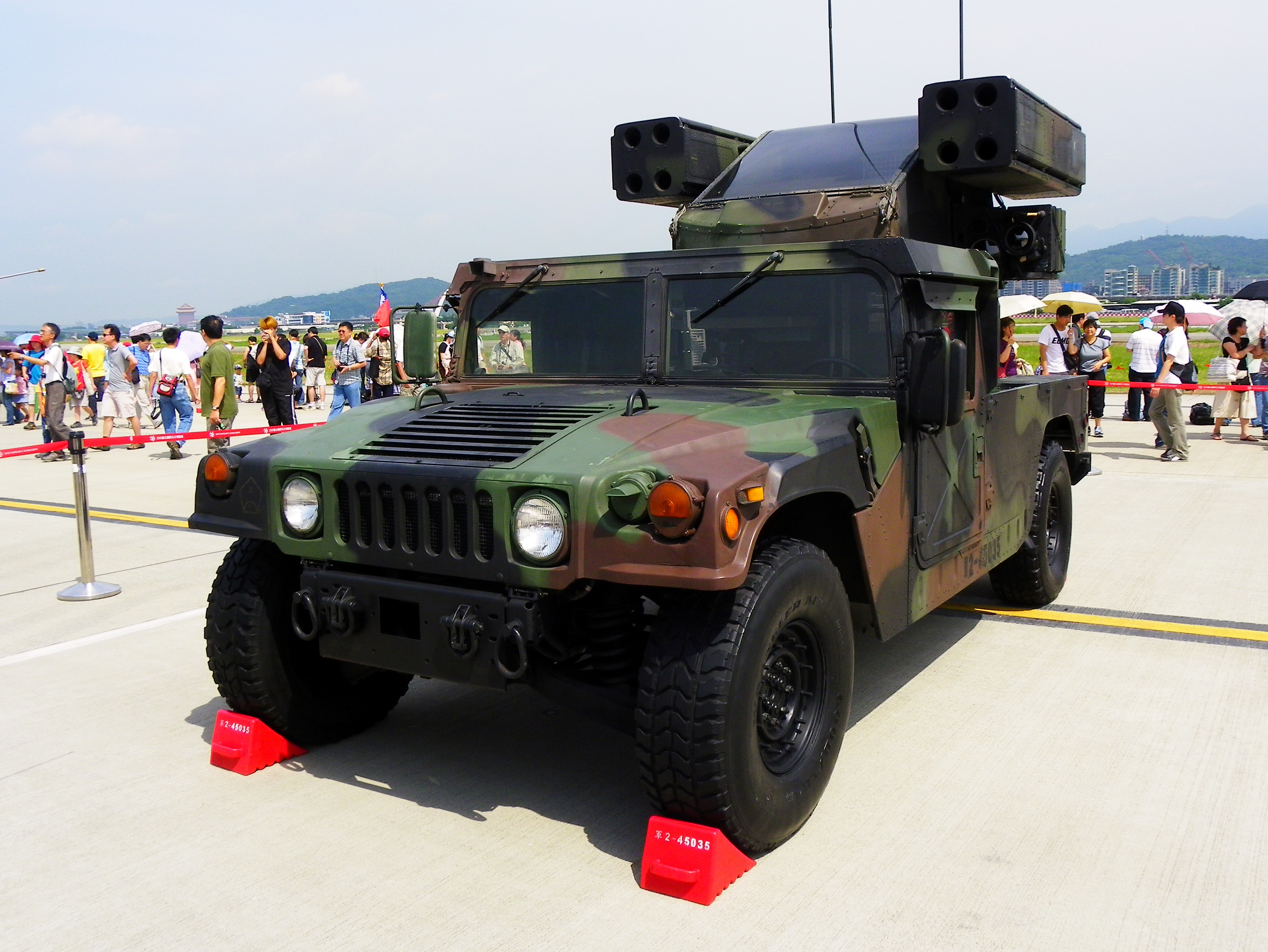
A Taiwanese Avenger

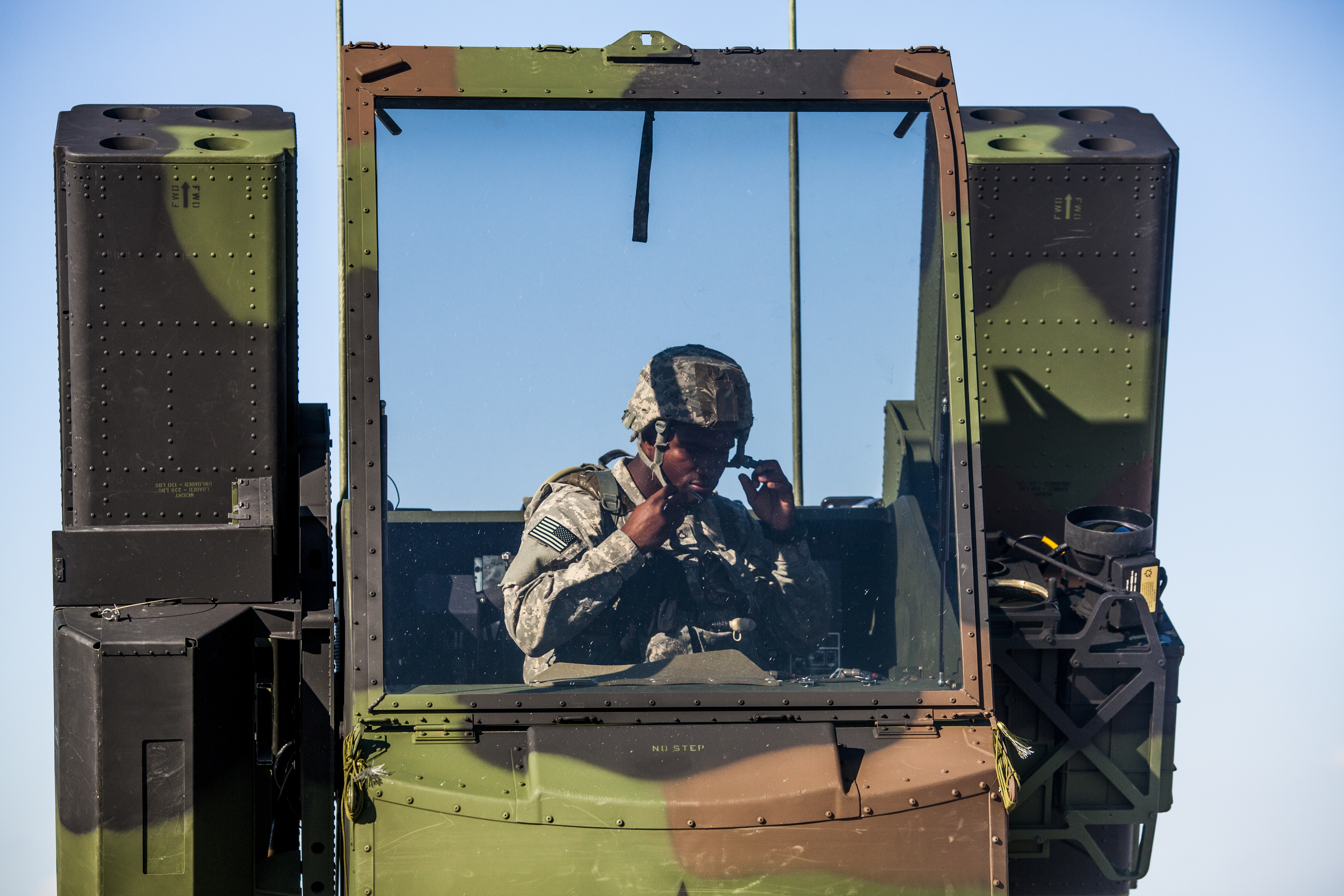
The operator's cabin on a US Army Avenger

=== Dimensions ===
- Length – 16 feet 3 inches (4.95 m)
- Width – 7 feet 2 inches (2.18 m)
- Height – 8 feet 8 inches (2.64 m)
- Weight – 8,600 pounds (3,900 kg)
- Crew – 2 (Basic), 3 (STC)
- Road speed – 55 miles per hour (89 km/h)
- Vehicle range – 275 miles (443 km)
- Engine – Detroit Diesel cooled V-8
- Engine power output – 135 horsepower (101 kW)

=== Weapons ===
- 4/8 ready-to-fire FIM-92 Stinger missiles
- One FN M3P machine gun built by FN Herstal, a variant of the Browning AN/M3 developed for aviation use during World War II. It is a 12.7 mm (.50) caliber machine gun with an electronic trigger that can be fired from both the remote control unit (RCU) located in the drivers cab, and from the handstation located in the Avenger turret. It has a 950 to 1100 rounds per minute firing rate. Loads one box of 200–250 rounds at a time.

=== Electronics ===
The operational heart of the AN/TWQ-1 system is an integrated electronics suite including sensors, targeting and fire-control subsystems. These subsystems allow manual, remote, or automated engagement of aerial threats. In 1987, Boeing became prime integrator of Avenger including subsystems. Subsystems and subcomponents include:

- Sensor and targeting suite consisting of:
  - FLIR imager, a Raytheon AN/VLR-1, doubling as eye-safe laser rangefinder (LRF) and video auto-tracker
  - 8x optical sight unit with reticle and laser filter for visual identification and back-up for sensor failures
  - AN/PPX-3A/B Mode 3/4 compatible IFF interrogator to avoid fratricide
  - Avenger fire-control computer (AFCC), or Avenger control electronics (ACE), is manufactured by General Dynamics
- Sensitivity Time Control (STC) system obtains integrated and processed target data from the AFCC, and consists of:
  - Land navigation system (LNS) which provides real-time heading and current position of the Avenger supporting fire on-the-move operations
  - Control display terminal (CDT) displays operational information with a direct interface to the RCU
  - Handheld terminal unit (HHTU) and air situation display, a small computer terminal receiving, processing and siplaying messages and operational data
- Communications and Network Integration:
  - SINCGARS capable radios
  - AN/PSN-11 Precision Lightweight GPS Receiver (PLGR)
  - AN/PSQ-6 Enhanced Position Location Reporting System (EPLRS)
  - CP-1995/U Simplified Handheld Terminal Unit (SHTU)
  - Forward Area Air Defense Command and Control (FAAD C^{2}) integration to receive cueing from other air defense radars like the AN/MPQ-64 Sentinel
- Remote Control Unit (RCU) using an encrypted RF link for secure control and video transmission up to 160 feet (50 m) away

== Operators ==
- Bahrain
- Egypt
- Iraq
- Lithuania – LAF Air Defence Battalion
- Taiwan – Avenger batteries have been upgraded integrating CS/MPQ-90 Bee Eye radars
- United States – U.S. Army - 453 M1097 Avenger as of January 2025 and U.S. Marine Corps
- Ukraine – 20 were delivered from December 2022 onwards.

== See also ==
- Anti-aircraft warfare
- Atılgan PMADS – Turkish military electronics equipment company
- FIM-92 Stinger – U.S. man-portable surface-to-air missile
- United States Army Aviation and Missile Command
- List of military electronics of the United States

=== Comparable systems ===
- Type 92 Yitian – (China)
- Type 93 Surface-to-air missile – (Japan)
- 9K35 Strela-10 – (Soviet Union, Russia) (SA-13 Gopher)
- 9K31 Strela-1 – (Soviet Union) (SA-9 Gaskin)
