= Forward Area Air Defense System =

Forward Area Air Defense System (FAADS) was a program proposed by the U.S. Army in January 1986. It aimed to develop a series of new short range air defense systems for divisional forces, providing adequate forward area air defense and overcoming the existing and projected air threat. In 1986, FAADS was one of the Army's top acquisition requirements, second only to the requirement for the Bradley Fighting Vehicle. In July 1986, the Defense Acquisition Board approved the FAADS concept. Although the Army estimated it could build the FAAD system for $9.3 billion in the beginning, it later acknowledged to a House subcommittee in early 1986 that the final price tag could be as high as $22 billion. In December 1989, the Army estimated that the FAADS components would cost about $11 billion to develop and produce.

== Background ==
Before the Army began fielding FAADS, its forward area air defense weapon systems included 2 infrared homing missiles (the M48 Chaparral and the man-portable FIM-92 Stinger) and the 20-mm M163 VADS. These systems were supported by an aging radar network (AN/MPQ-49 Forward Area Alerting Radar) and a manual command, control, and communication system. M247 Sergeant York, the prototype of the former project DIVAD (Division Air Defense), was terminated by the Secretary of Defense in August 1985 because it could not handle the stand-off attack helicopter threat. Army analysis and training had revealed that the projected air threat could strike ground forces from distances beyond the range of current frontline missile systems and the DIVAD. Field tests also revealed difficulties in engaging stationary helicopter targets. Afterwards, the Air Defense Artillery's Directorate of Combat Development developed a new air defense concept for the forward area called FAAD system. It concluded that the air defense problem could not be solved with any one system. Instead, it recommended that the Army acquire several weapons and an improved command and control system to operate as an integrated air defense system.

== Concept ==
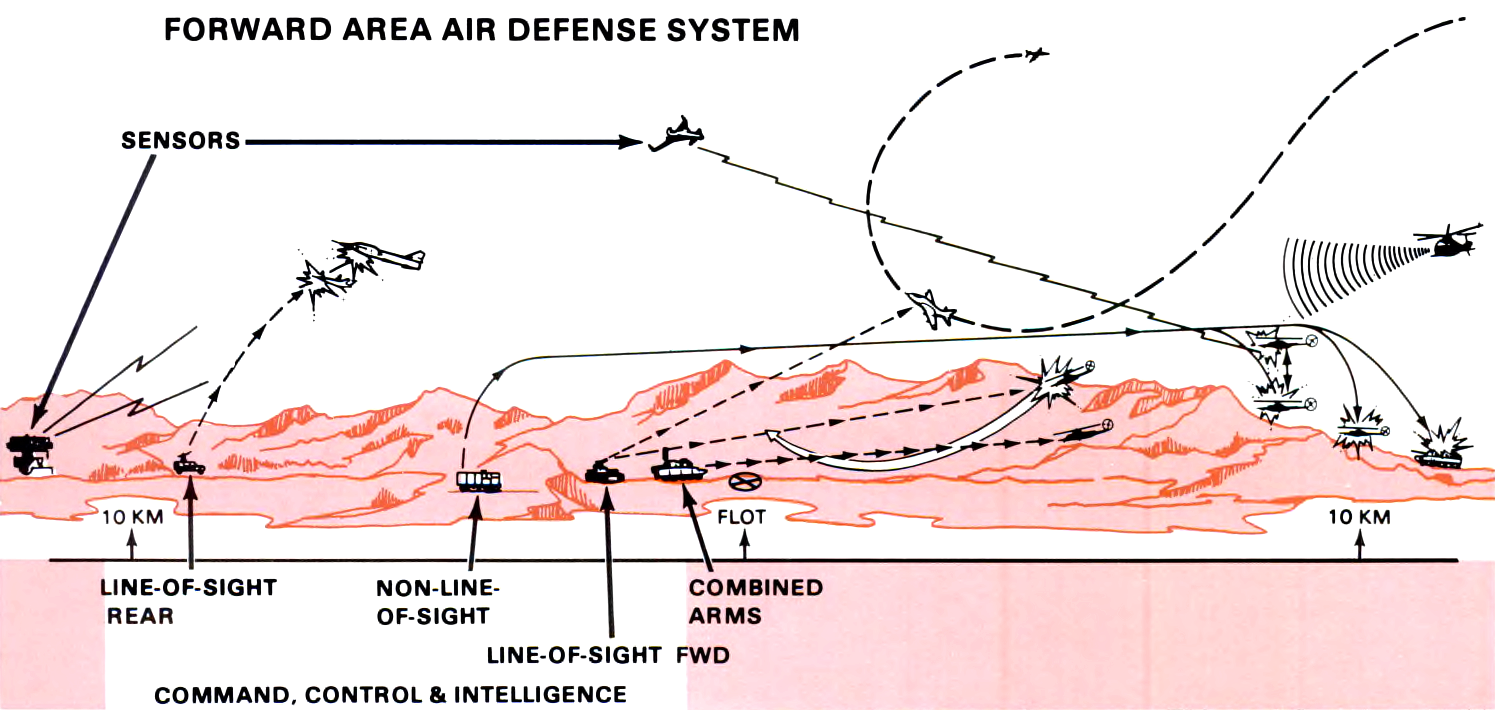
The concept of FAADS. The entire system was deployed within 10 kilometers of the front line, engaging air and ground targets located within 10 kilometers in front of and behind the front line.

In the mid-1980s, the Army's critical operational Air Defense deficiencies were:

1. Increasing threat weapon ranges and lethality beyond the capabilities of deployed defensive systems.
2. Air Defense system capabilities inadequate to support the new AirLand Battle concepts.
3. Vulnerability of critical support and command installations vital to battlefield sustainment.
4. Effectiveness shortfalls of the man-portable Stinger due to human factors limiting the weapon system's full potential.

FAADS was to be made up of five elements.

1. LOS-FH (Line-of-sight-forward (heavy)). This system was to include both a missile and a gun to operate in the forward battle area.
2. LOS-R (Line-of-sight-rear). This system was to protect the division’s rear area.
3. NLOS (Non-line-of-sight). This system was to attack targets hidden from view.
4. CAI (Combined arms initiative). It was to increase self-defense capabilities for tanks, infantry fighting vehicles, and helicopters, which would be used to attack aircraft targets in the forward area.
5. C2I/C3I (Command, control, communications and intelligence network). This system was to connect the other FAADS elements, sharing information such as the locations of air targets.

== Components ==
=== LOS-FH ===
The LOS-FH system was to provide protection for tanks and infantry fighting vehicles against fixed- and rotary-wing threat aircraft. In addition to its missile and gun, the system was to have communications equipment and aircraft detection, identification, and tracking sensors integrated on an armored tracked vehicle. The system was designed to operate day or night, in adverse weather conditions, and in battlefield environments where electronic and physical countermeasures were prevalent. It was also to operate either autonomously or in conjunction with the C2I network. In August 1987, the Army planned to purchase 562 LOS-FH systems. Their first baseline cost estimate, dated August 1987, showed a total estimated program cost for the LOS-FH system of $5.7 billion in fiscal year (FY) 1988. In January 1986, the Army conducted a market survey to identify firms that were interested in competing for the LOS-FH system and could offer an air defense system ready for production or requiring minimal additional development. They found none of them met the Army’s total system performance requirements. The Army tested 4 competing systems at White Sands Missile Range from July to early November 1987:

- Rapier - This competitor was a tracked Rapier SAM which represented British Aerospace teamed with United Technologies.
- Paladin - This competitor was a XM975 variant of Roland SAM which represented Euromissile teamed with Hughes Aircraft.
- ADATS - This competitor was an Air Defense Anti-Tank System which represented Oerlikon-Bührle teamed with Martin Marietta.
- Liberty - This competitor was a R460 SICA variant of Crotale SAM which represented Thomson-CSF teamed with Ling-Temco-Vought.

Although none of the 4 systems tested met the Army’s total requirements, they concluded that ADATS showed the best potential for achieving that goal. On November 30, 1987, the Army announced that it had selected the ADATS system as the winner. The designation MIM-146A was assigned to the tactical ADATS missile, and inert rounds for ground-handling training were designated DMTM-146A. The Army planned to install a 25-mm Bushmaster gun on the ADATS systems. In December 1989, the Army estimated the ADATS development and production cost at over $6.8 billion ($318.8 million for development and $6,516.4 million for production). The Army had purchased 4 fire units and 14 missiles for testing and training purposes. They planned to purchase 562 ADATS fire units and 10,078 missiles, and each heavy division would receive 36 fire units. In February 1992, the MIM-146 program was cancelled for budget streamlining.

=== LOS-R ===
In the Summer of 1985, the Army Air Defense Artillery Board and Army Development and Employment Agency tested the Setter and Avenger systems. The Setter SAM was a Stinger missile system similar to the Avenger and developed by the U.S. Army's Missile Command and General Dynamics Corporation. The Army called these types of Stinger Missile Systems Pedestal-Mounted Stingers (PMS). The 9th Infantry Division's Air Defense Artillery conducted these tests at the Yakima Washington Firing Center. These tests "indicated that the technology was advanced enough to warrant a non-developmental item acquisition strategy." The FAAD Working Group recommended that a PMS system be used as the LOS-R component of the FAAD system. This recommendation was then presented to the Secretary of Defense Caspar Weinberger in January 1986 and was subsequently approved. In July 1986, the Army issued a Request For Proposal for a PMS system. Three companies submitted proposals and a $100,000 test support contract was given to each to supply a single prototype PMS for testing during the Non-Developmental Item Candidate Evaluation (NDICE). The three companies were Boeing Aerospace with the Avenger, General Dynamics/Thomson-CSF/Hughes Electro-Optical Data Systems Group with an unnamed prototype and LTV Aerospace with the Crossbow, formerly called the Setter.

Eventually, the Avenger won the NDICE. In August 1987, the Army awarded Boeing an engineering development contract with production options to produce the Avenger for the Army. This was a $16.2 million contract for the first option buy of 20 Avengers. The contract also contained production options for FY 1987 through FY 1991 for a total procurement of 273 Avengers. In June and July 1988 at Fort Bliss, the Army began the 1st phase of Force Development Test and Evaluation (FDT&E) with the NDICE Avenger prototype to establish a baseline for tactics, doctrine, and training issues. Once production model Avengers were received, 6 were used to conduct the 2nd phase of FDT&E at Fort Hunter Liggett in February and March 1989. This phase was used to test and validate the concepts established in the 1st phase of FDT&E. In April 1989, the Army equipped its first tactical unit with Avengers. In January 1991, during the deployment of Avengers in support of Operation Desert Storm, they reached initial operating capability.

Once the original contract expired, the Army awarded a $436.2 million 5-year multiyear (FY 1991 through FY 1995) production contract to Boeing in February 1992 for the production of 679 Avengers. This number included 600 for the Army and 79 for the U.S. Marine Corps. The manufacturing and production section called for the total production of 1,207 Avenger systems through FY 1999. They would be used in heavy and light divisions and other units. Each division would receive 36 Avengers plus spares, and each corps would receive 54 Avengers plus spares. The system was approved for full-scale production in April 1990. This total was later changed to 1,779 and then to 1,001. All of these production quantities included systems produced under the initial contract options and the 5-year multiyear contract planned for FY 1991 through FY 1995. The Avenger filled the LOS-R portion of the FAADS. The contribution this highly mobile, short range air defense system made to the Army's full-dimensional protection enhanced the ground components prospects for dominant maneuver by preserving key elements of the force.

=== NLOS ===
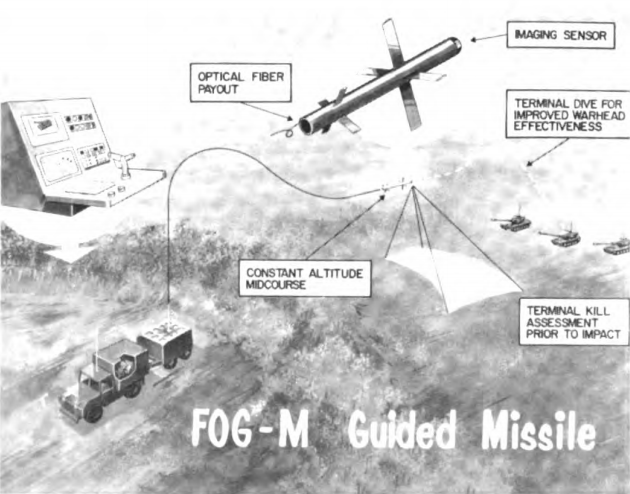
The concept of FOG-M missile

A video introducing the FOG-M missile

The Army had been developing a fiber-optic guided missile (FOG-M) technology for an antitank role since the mid-1970s. In November 1987, the Army solicited industry proposals for a novel air defense weapon utilizing the Army-developed FOG-M technology, designed to defeat masked helicopter targets. However, the bidding deadline was extended to the third quarter of FY 1988 following a major shift in acquisition strategy. The original Request for Proposal (RFP) envisioned acquiring an interim 'initial system,' to be succeeded 2 years later by a fully mature 'objective system.' Under the revised strategy, the initial system was eliminated to focus funding and development efforts solely on the objective system. By accelerating engineering development, the Army aimed to field the system by FY 1992, maintaining the timeline originally established for the initial capability.

In December 1988, the development contract was awarded to a team consisting of Boeing and Hughes. Boeing was responsible for the ground systems, while Hughes handled the missile development. This 42-month contract, valued at $131 million, was part of the NLOS component of the FAADS network. The total program cost was projected to reach $2 billion, procuring 285 heavy fire units (based on the MLRS chassis with 24 missiles each), 118 light fire units (based on the HMMWV with 6 missiles each), and a total of 16,550 missiles. Both television (TV) and infrared (IR) guidance versions were evaluated.

When engaging aerial targets, the FOG-M was launched vertically, pitched over 90°, and leveled off to fly toward the pre-programmed target coordinates. For ground targets, the missile followed a flight profile with a constant cruise altitude of 200 m before executing a terminal dive onto the target. Technically, the missile employed a Hughes-manufactured day/night, adverse-weather HgCdTe passive IR seeker. Target imagery was transmitted back to the launch station via a hair-thin, spool-wound fiber-optic data link, where it was processed and displayed on the gunner's console. The system also generated a full-color digital terrain map from a stored database to assist the gunner in route planning, a concept similar to the guidance system of the Pershing II ballistic missile. The missile carried a tandem warhead design to defeat armored targets equipped with explosive reactive armor. The forward shaped charge was adapted from the I-TOW to detonate the reactive armor, creating a path for the primary shaped charge—derived from the TOW-2 to penetrate the target's main armor.

The initial program phase was scheduled to conclude in June 1992 with the delivery of 4 heavy fire units, 5 light units, and 40 missiles. Operational testing was set to begin in 1993, featuring a tactical organization of one NLOS platoon operating alongside 3 LOS-FH (ADATS) platoons per Air Defense Battery, with 3 batteries per battalion. The FOG-M was designed to engage helicopters masked by terrain, with a secondary capability against armored ground targets. However, development costs soon escalated to $639 million. During testing, the system achieved a 58% success rate against targets at ranges of up to 10 km, including troops, moving targets, and hovering helicopters. In December 1989, the Secretary of Defense deleted all procurement funds for the FOG-M from the 5-year defense plan, but the Army still planned to complete FOG-M development in December 1993. The FOG-M development cost was estimated at $631 million. In January 1991, this project was terminated.

=== CAI ===
This system was dedicated to adding air defense equipment to front-line equipment such as tanks and armored vehicles. Various projects included installing air defense equipment such as installing 50-cal. guns on M1 tanks, placing air-to-air Stinger missiles on helicopters such as the OH-58 Kiowa to counter Soviet helicopter forces, providing tanks with ammunition that was more effective against helicopters, and placing new devices on Bradley Fighting Vehicle sights that would help gunners lead aircraft. The Army would have to rely on some older forward area air defense systems to differing degrees for the near future because of delays in fielding several FAADS components. The Army planned to use some of these systems to provide air defense in areas that it believed had not had sufficient coverage in the past. Older air defense weapons might be transferred to the reserve components as the active forces received FAADS.

=== C2I/C3I ===
This system were expected to consist of a sensor (the Sentinel radar) and a digital command and control network, including hand-held terminal units and enhanced position location reporting system (EPLARS) radios to carry data to weapon platforms. It would acquire information from various sensors. The sensors would include not only those sensors organic to the air defense units, but also those managed by other battlefield functional areas, such as electronic warfare and fire support. A specific enhancement was the integration of aerial sensors such as unmanned aerial vehicles. The look down capability of the UAV would provide early warning and cueing for NLOS. All air defense systems including HIMAD and SHORAD would be integrated into a Joint Tactical Information Distribution System (JTIDS) which would share real time digital data obtained from the myriad of sensors with all users. The division Army Airborne Command and Control (A2C2) Element, which coordinated the use of all friendly airspace, would also be integrated into the JTIDS net. In December 1989, the Army estimated the acquisition cost for the FAADS C3I component at over $2.2 billion-$1,120.8 million for development and $1,103.1 million for procurement. The various C3I elements were scheduled to be fielded between December 1993 and September 1998, depending on the element.

== Cancellation and Legacy ==
After the end of the Cold War in 1991, the collapse of the Soviet Union, coupled with declining budgets and political outcry for a so-called peace dividend, dramatically slowed development of the proposed FAADS. Avenger became the only original FAADS program that would survive and progress into full-scale production. Several FAADS components were terminated or transitioned to other programs. In July 1991, the NLOS program was moved to another project called Non-Line-of-Sight Combined Arms (NLOS-CA) by the Army, becoming the foundation of MGM-157 EFOGM. The Avenger SAM, which fully met the requirements and had been involved in the Persian Gulf War, was retained. For a brief period after 1992, the U.S. military installed Stinger missiles on M2A2 Bradley and named them the M6 Bradley Linebacker SAM to temporarily provide armored air defense firepower for the front lines in the LOS-FH program.

== Gallery ==
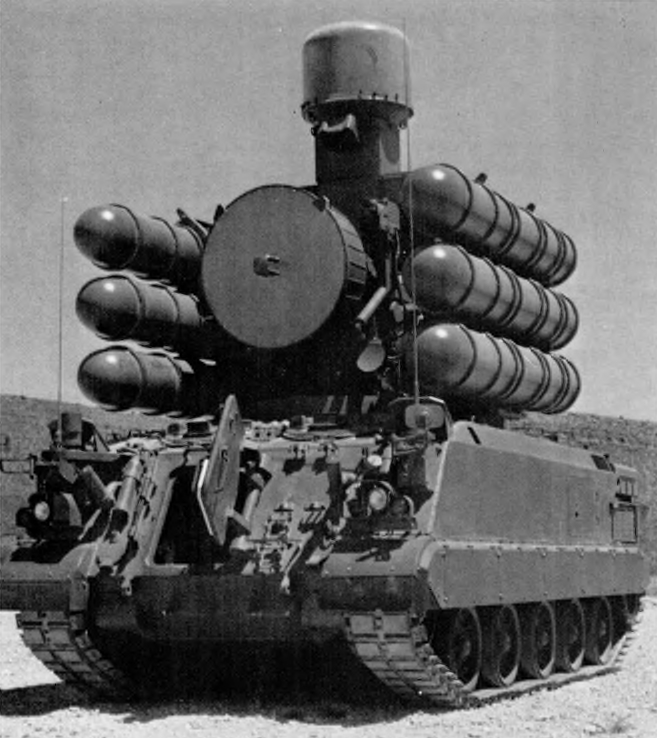
Liberty

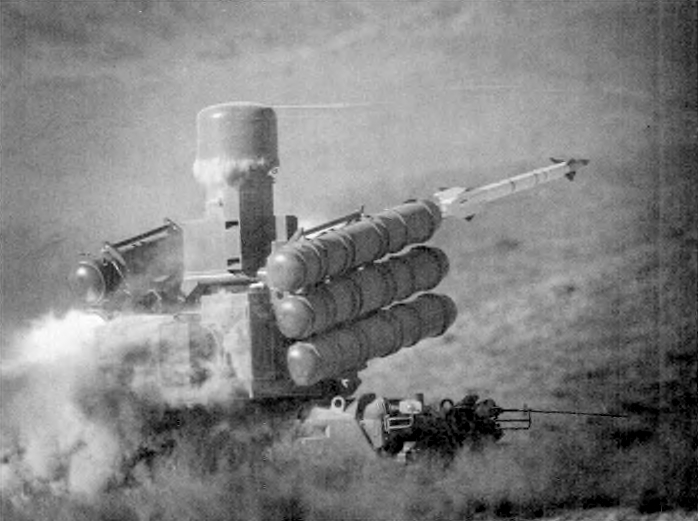
The firing Liberty

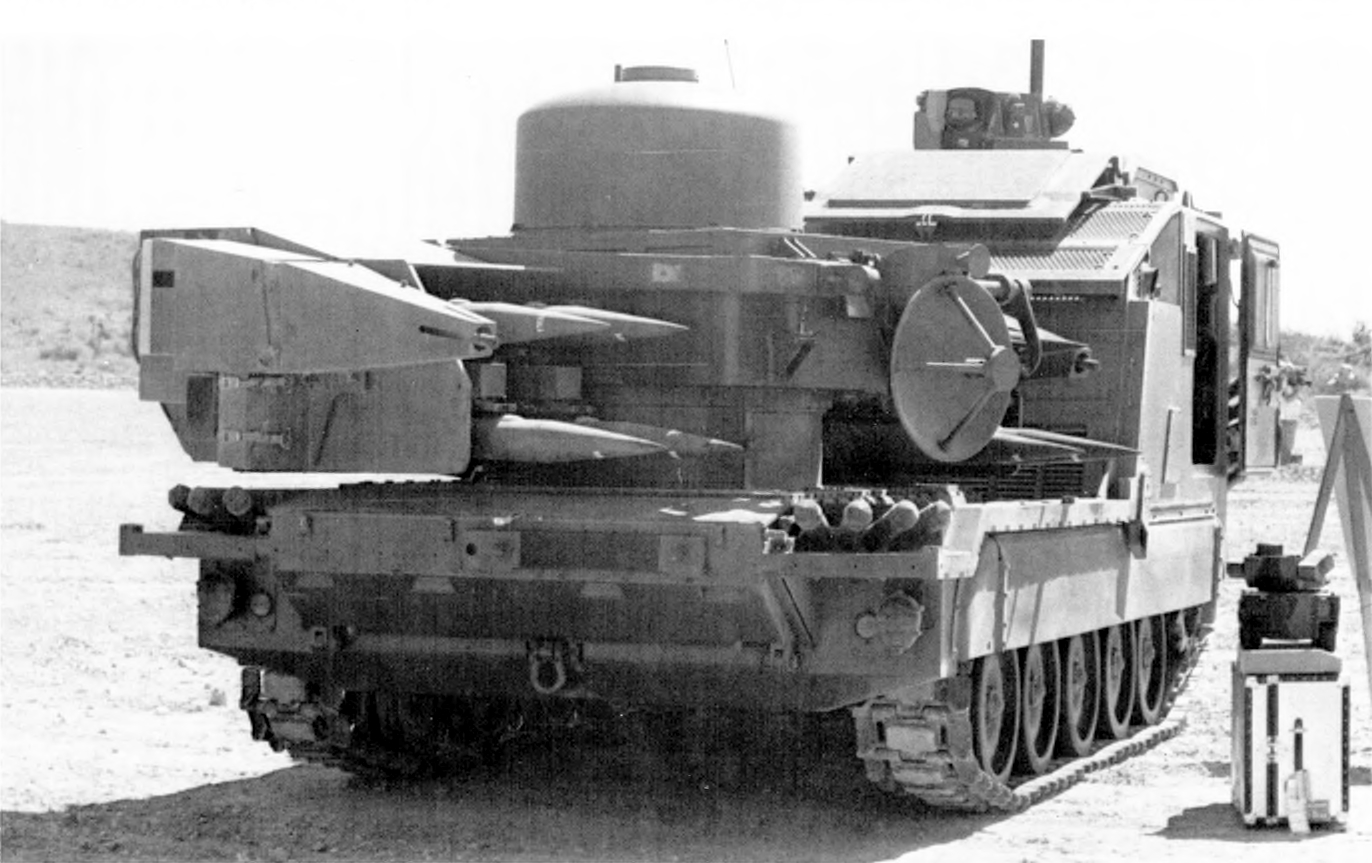
Rapier

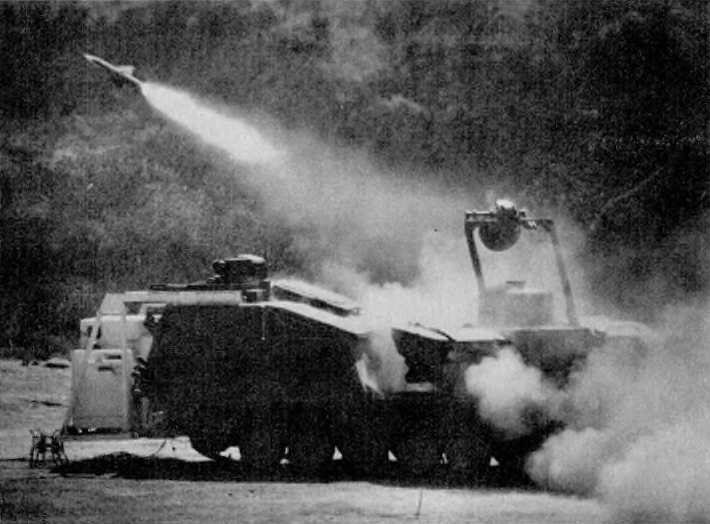
The firing Rapier

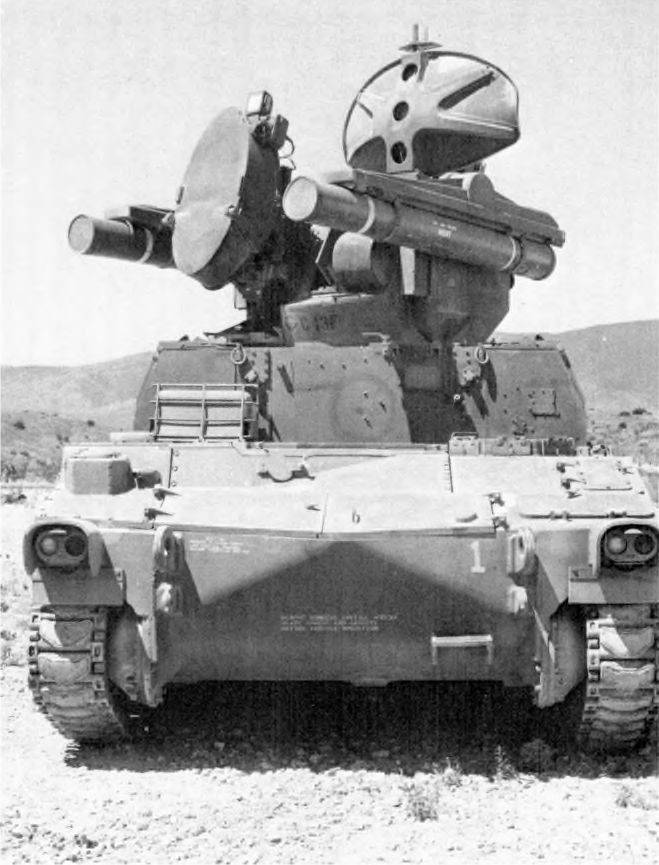
Paladin

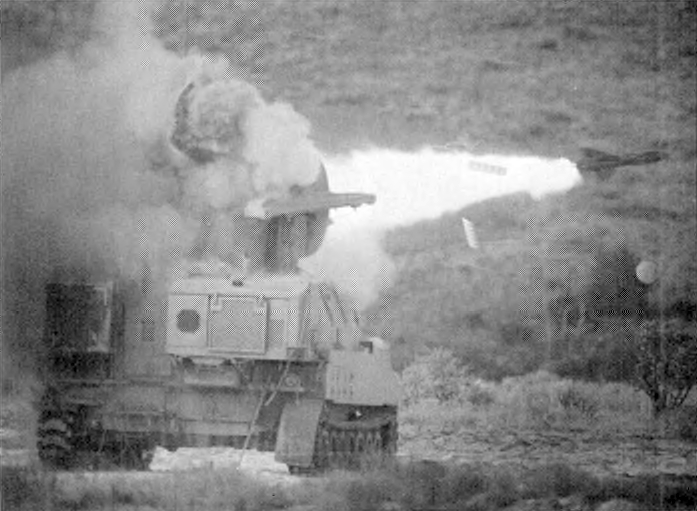
The firing Paladin

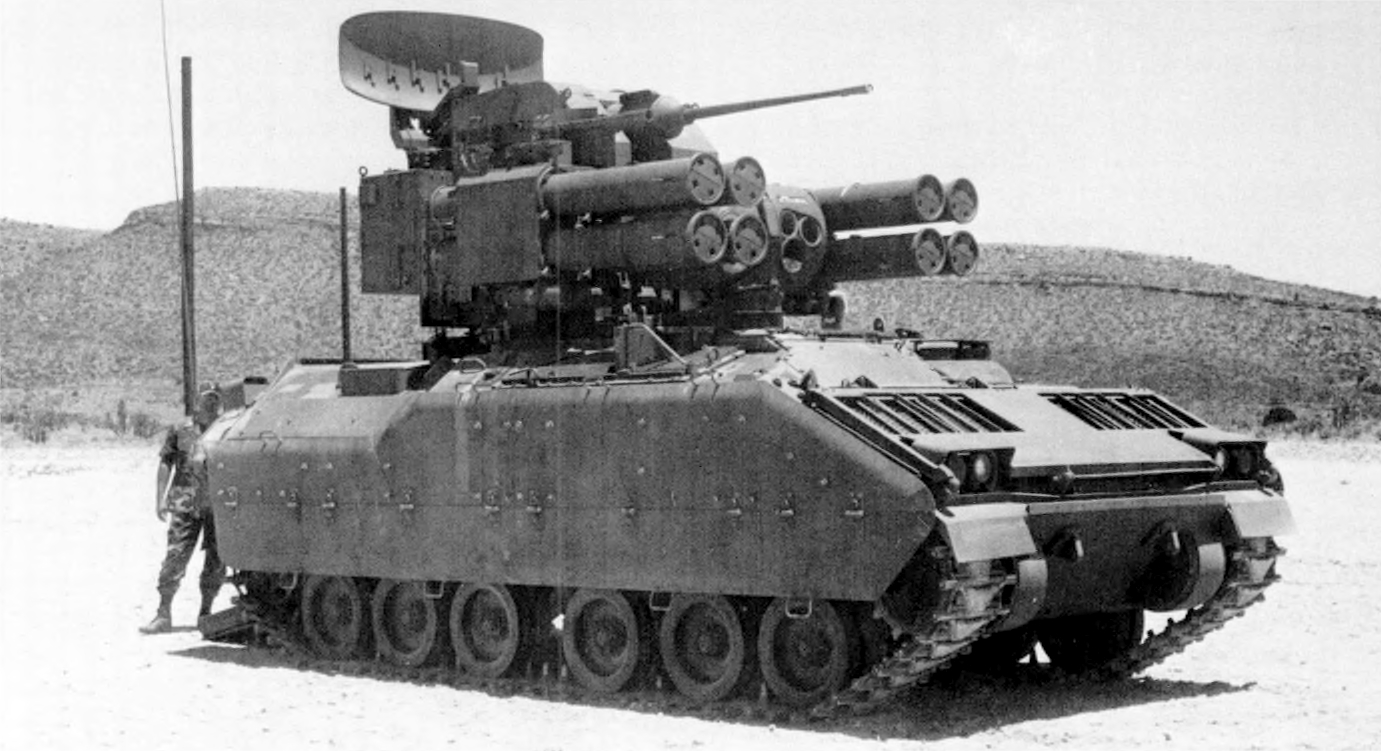
ADATS

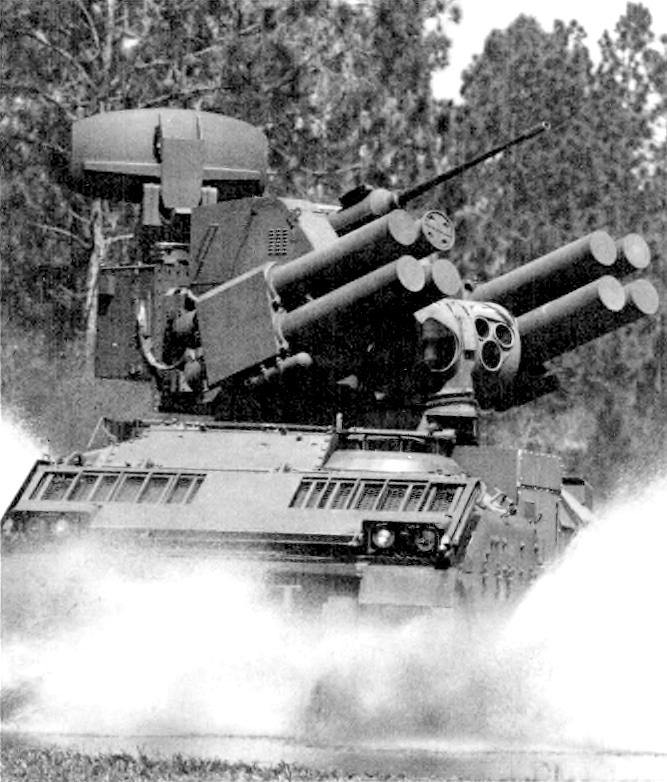
The firing ADATS

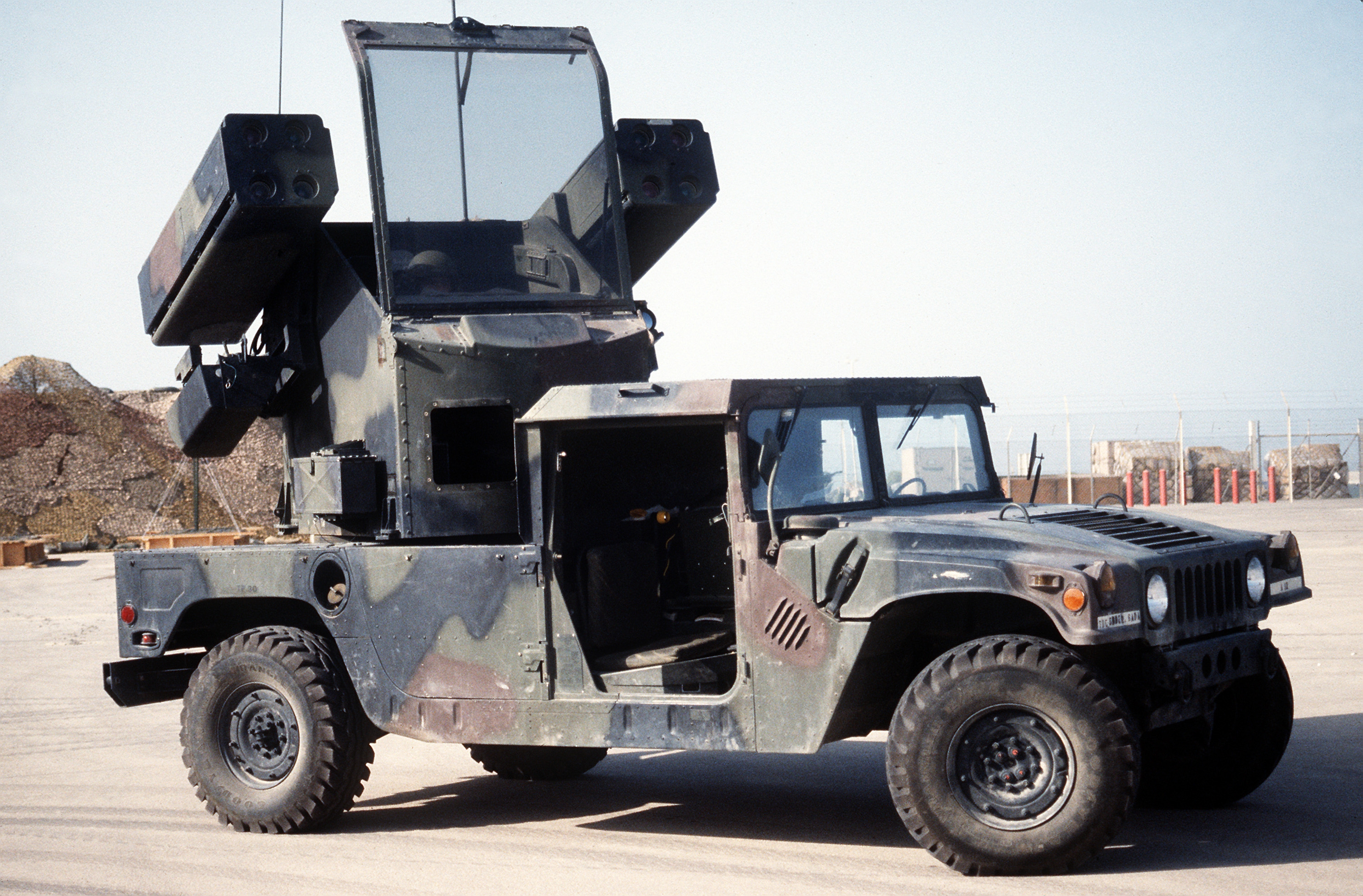
LOS-R winner Avenger SAM

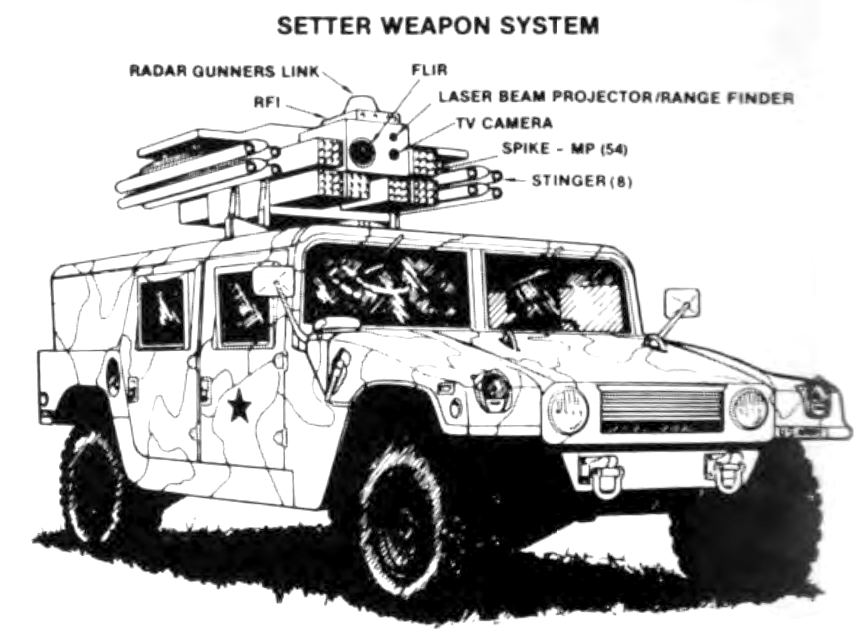
Setter SAM

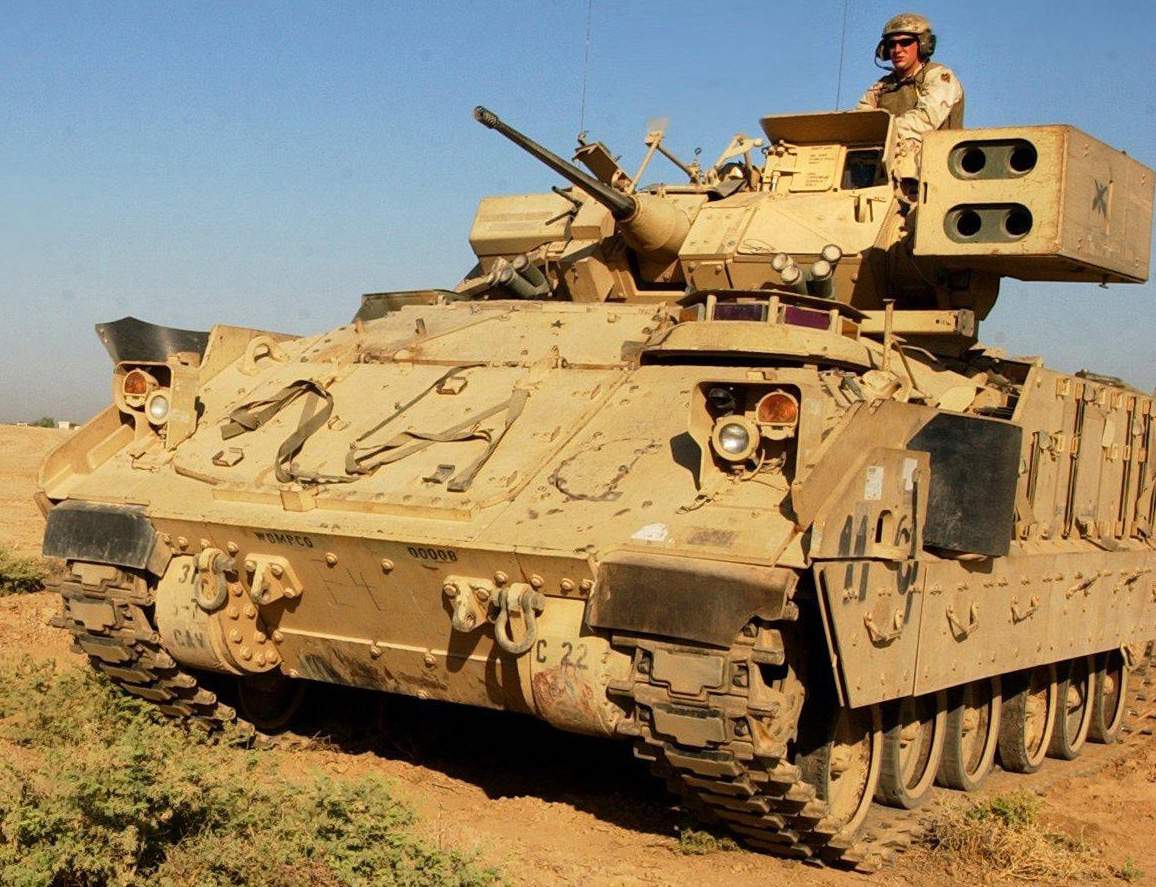
M6 Linebacker SAM

== See also ==
- Short range air defense
- Self-propelled anti-aircraft weapon
- Surface-to-air missile

== Bibliography ==
- Cohen, Jonathan M. (December 1999). "Divisional Air Defense 1945-Present". Military Review. 79 (6). ISSN 0026-4148.
- Cothran, Julian (December 1995). "Growing the Army's FAAD weapon systems into maturity". Program Manager. Vol. 24, no. 6. ISSN 0199-7114.
- Cullen, Tony; Foss, Christopher Frank (1993). Jane's Land-based Air-Defence, Edition 1992–1993. Jane's Information Group. ISBN 9780710609793.
- General Accounting Office (30 June 1988). Acquisition of the Army's Line-of-Sight Forward Heavy Air Defense System (PDF) (Report). Archived (PDF) from the original on 2023-06-29.
- General Accounting Office (25 June 1990). Selected Aspects of the Army's Forward Area Air Defense System (PDF) (Report). Archived (PDF) from the original on 2024-04-28.
- Jones, Walter (June 1996). Case analysis of the U.S. Army Warfighting Rapid Acquisition Program: Bradley Stinger Fighting Vehicle -- Enhanced weapon system (PDF) (Master thesis). Monterey: Naval Postgraduate School. Archived (PDF) from the original on 2019-04-16.
- Landry, Alan D. (1 January 1990). "Stinger Under Armor": An Analysis of Alternatives (PDF) (Report). Fort Leavenworth: United States Army Command and General Staff College. Archived from the original (PDF) on 2021-12-19.
- McCoy, Edward D. (1990). Employment and command and control for the non-line-of-sight (NLOS) missile system (PDF) (Master thesis). Monterey: Naval Postgraduate School. Archived (PDF) from the original on 2023-07-05.
- Stearns, Kenneth M. (March 1994). The Avenger Air Defense System: an examination of the nondevelopmental item acquisition strategy (PDF) (Master thesis). Monterey: Naval Postgraduate School. Archived (PDF) from the original on 2019-04-16.
- Wiggins, Jr.; Vince, R. (2015). "Balancing Air and Missile Defense to Better Support Maneuver". Military Review. 95 (6). United States of America: Army University Press: 55–63. ISSN 0026-4148.
