= CS/MPQ-90 Bee Eye =

Taiwanese radar

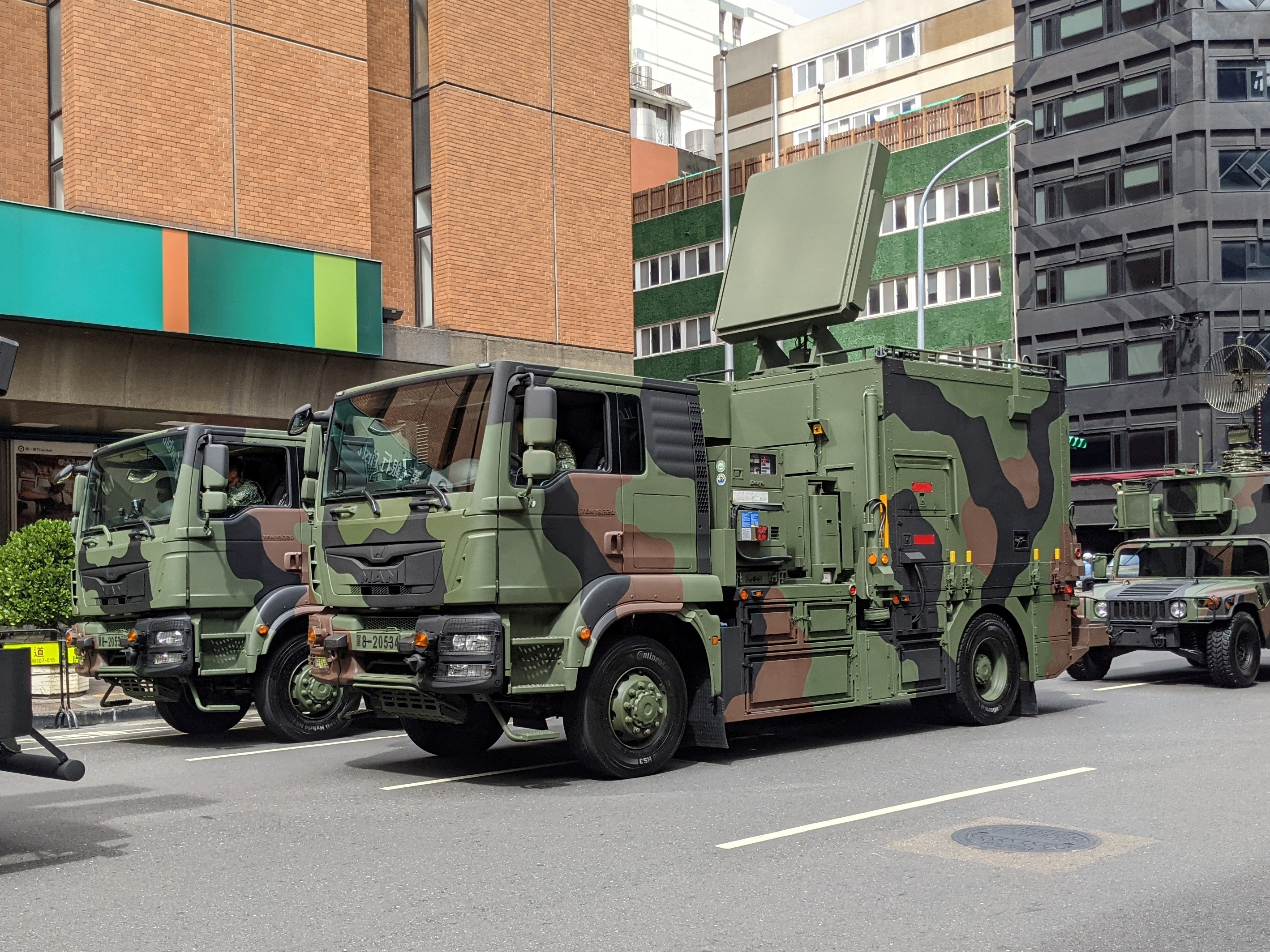
- A truck-mounted CS/MPQ-90, 2021
- Country of origin: Taiwan
- Manufacturer: National Chung-Shan Institute of Science and Technology
- No. built: 23 (2022)
- Type: PESA

The CS/MPQ-90 Bee Eye is a Taiwanese passive electronically scanned array (PESA) type radar developed by the National Chung-Shan Institute of Science and Technology (NCSIST) intended for air defense target searching and tracking.

== Description ==
The CS/MPQ-90 is a short-medium range 3D air defense PESA radar designed and produced by the NCSIST. It has been seen mounted on conventional wheeled trucks, as well as the multimode search/track radar system of Tuo Chiang-class corvettes.

The CS/MPQ-90 has been integrated with Taiwan’s AN/TWQ-1 Avenger missile batteries.

Operational land-based systems were first seen in public in 2010.

Six systems were ordered in 2019 to equip TC-2 missile batteries.

== Development scandal ==
In 2011 NCSIST awarded the MiTAC electronics company a NT$70 million (US$2.22 million) contract to build one prototype “Radar Vehicle for Field Operation and Air Defense.” In 2015 police in Taoyuan took into custody three workers and one manager from MiTAC on charges of forgery of data and fabrication of test results. The tender required the vehicle to be able to advance at 8 km/h up a 40 degree incline, the vehicle MiTAC delivered could only advance at 6 km/h. Three NCSIST staff were also detained on suspicion of colluding with the MiTAC employees to fabricate test results, these staff then presented the fabricated results to their superiors for approval. The Taoyuan District Prosecutors’ Office began investigating after receiving a tip.

== Variants ==
=== CS/SPS-2B(Naval) ===
A naval version known as the “Sea Bee Eye” was installed aboard ROCN Hwai Yang (FFG-937) for testing.

The naval version is to be deployed as the air search and target indication radar component of the TC-2N surface-to-air missile system, as part of a self-contained fire control system aboard Taiwan’s Kang Ding (La Fayette) class frigates/Ta Chiang(PGG-619) and as part of the central combat management system aboard the Yushan-class landing platform dock.

=== CS/MPQ-112X(Land based) ===
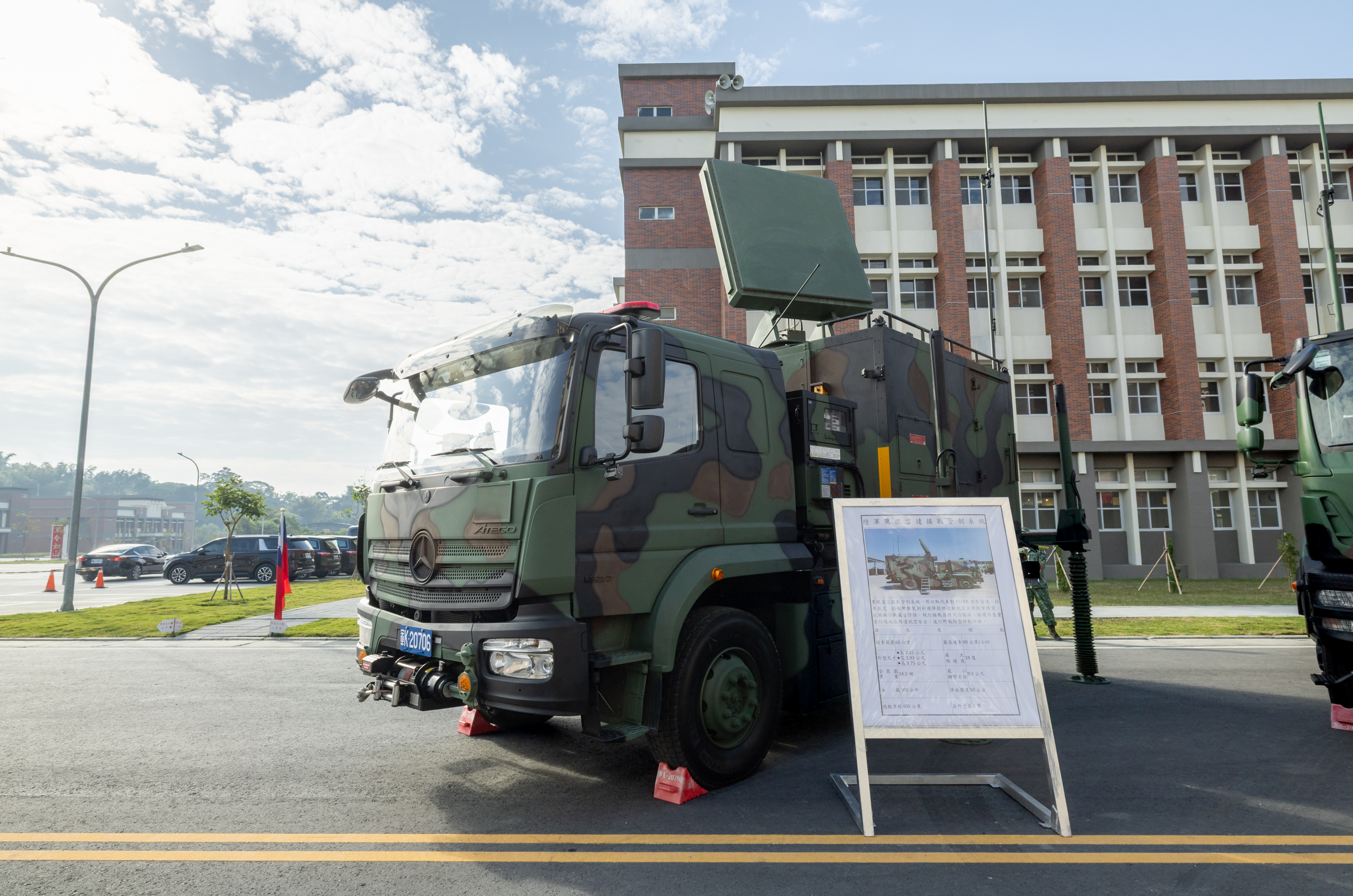
Eagle Eye Radar Engagement and Control System (CS/MPQ-112X)

The “Eagle Eye Radar Engagement and Control System” is equipped with the CS/MPQ-112X radar. The system was initiated as a procurement project in 2021 under the designation “New Target Acquisition Radar System.” A budget of NT$3,247,498,000 was allocated for the procurement of 11 systems and 65 radar information display units, which are scheduled to be delivered to the Army in batches from 2022 to 2026. The Eagle Eye Radar System was developed through the modification and enhancement of the Bee Eye Radar and has an approximate detection range of 60 kilometers. The new radar employs T/R (Transmitter and Receiver Module) units, which are reportedly based on specifications similar to those of ASEA radar systems. The system integrates the radar vehicle and command-and-control vehicle into a single vehicle-mounted platform, providing high mobility and surveillance and detection capabilities. The vehicle has a maximum road speed of 90 km/h and a maximum cruising range of approximately 400 kilometers. In addition, the system requires a relatively small operating crew, with only three personnel required for operation.

== Gallery ==
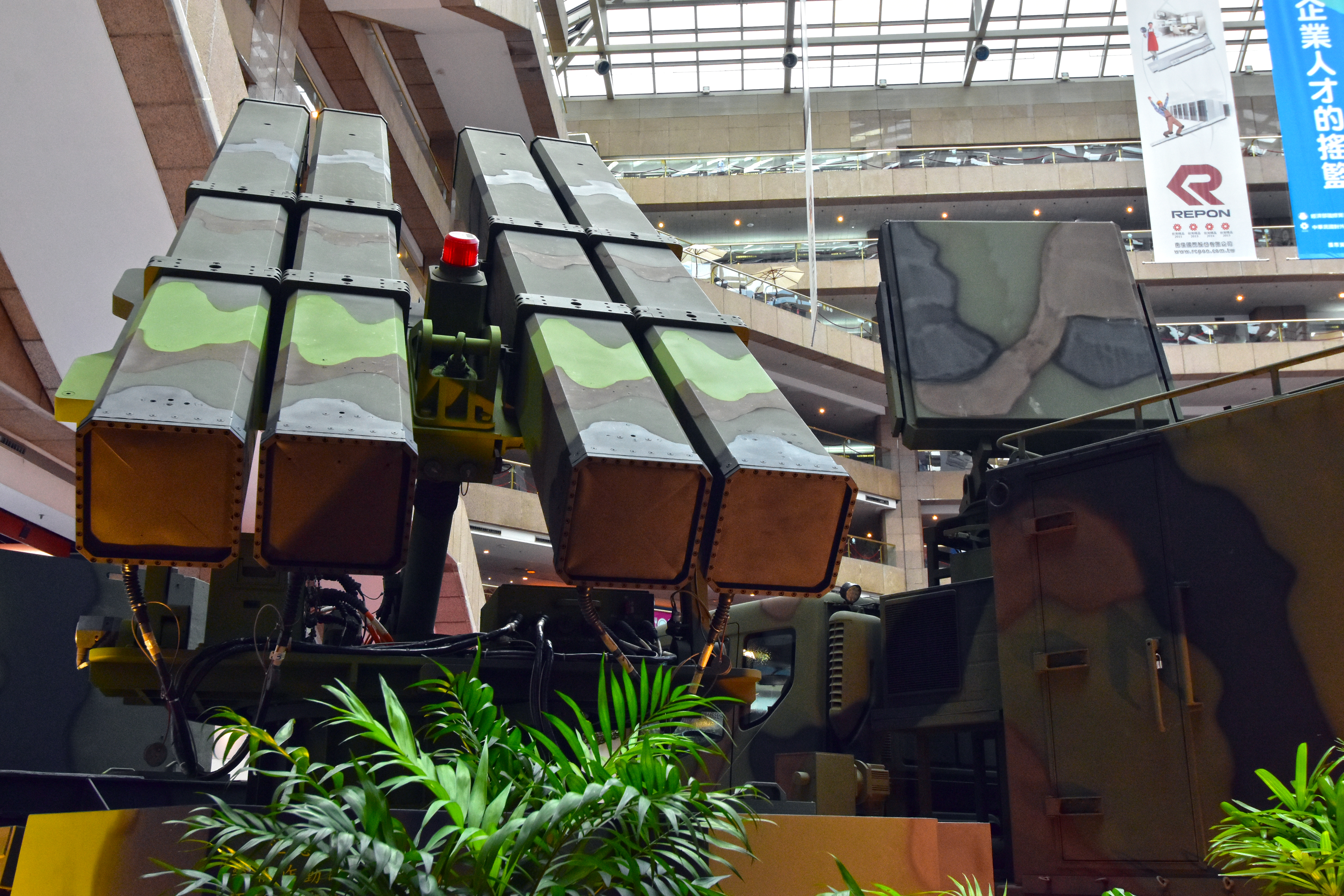
Land based Surface-to-Air TC-2 model and CS/MPQ-90 Bee Eye radar

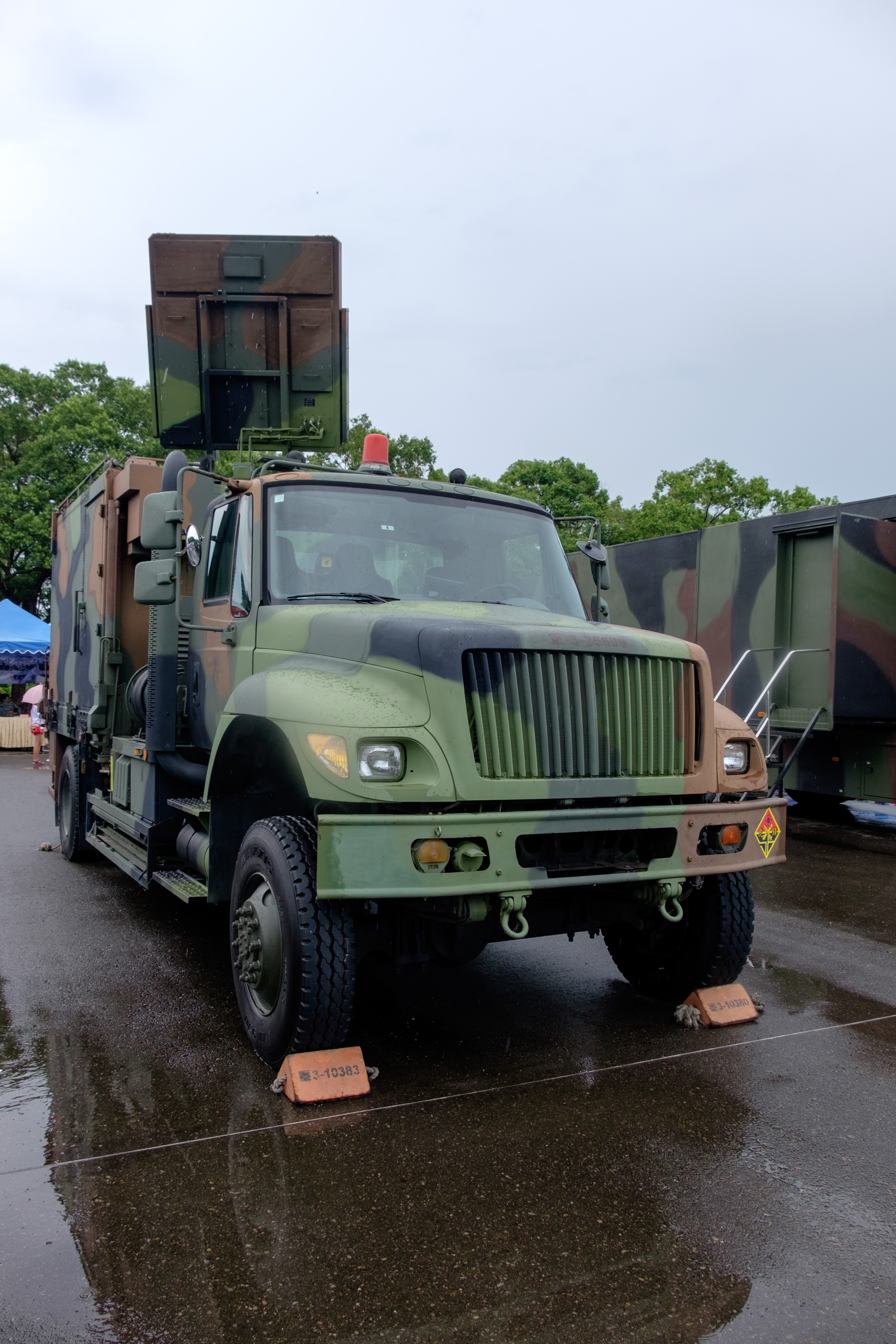
Point Defense Array Radar System CS/MPQ-90 at Chengkungling Ground, 2015

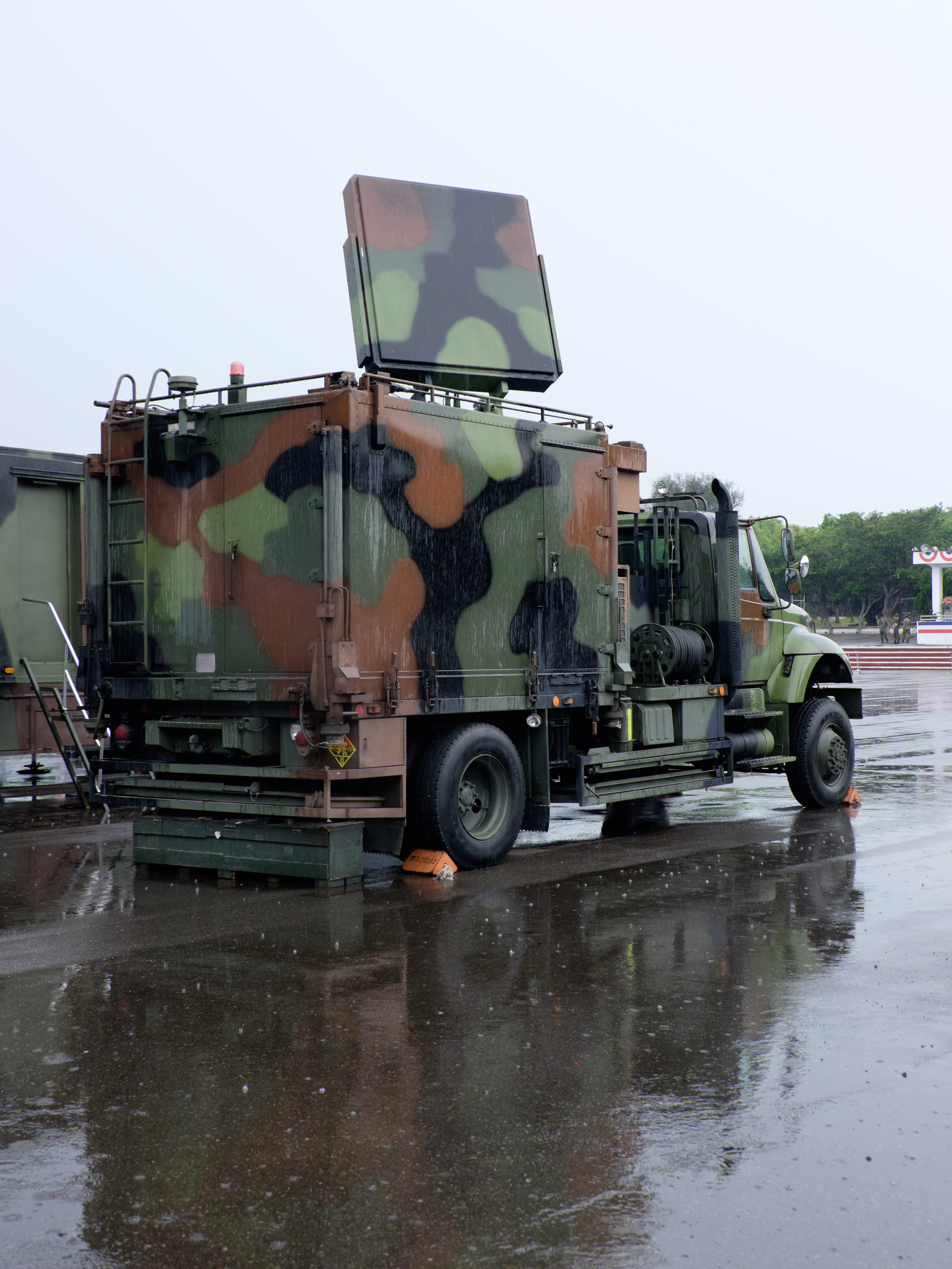
A truck-mounted CS/MPQ-90, 2015

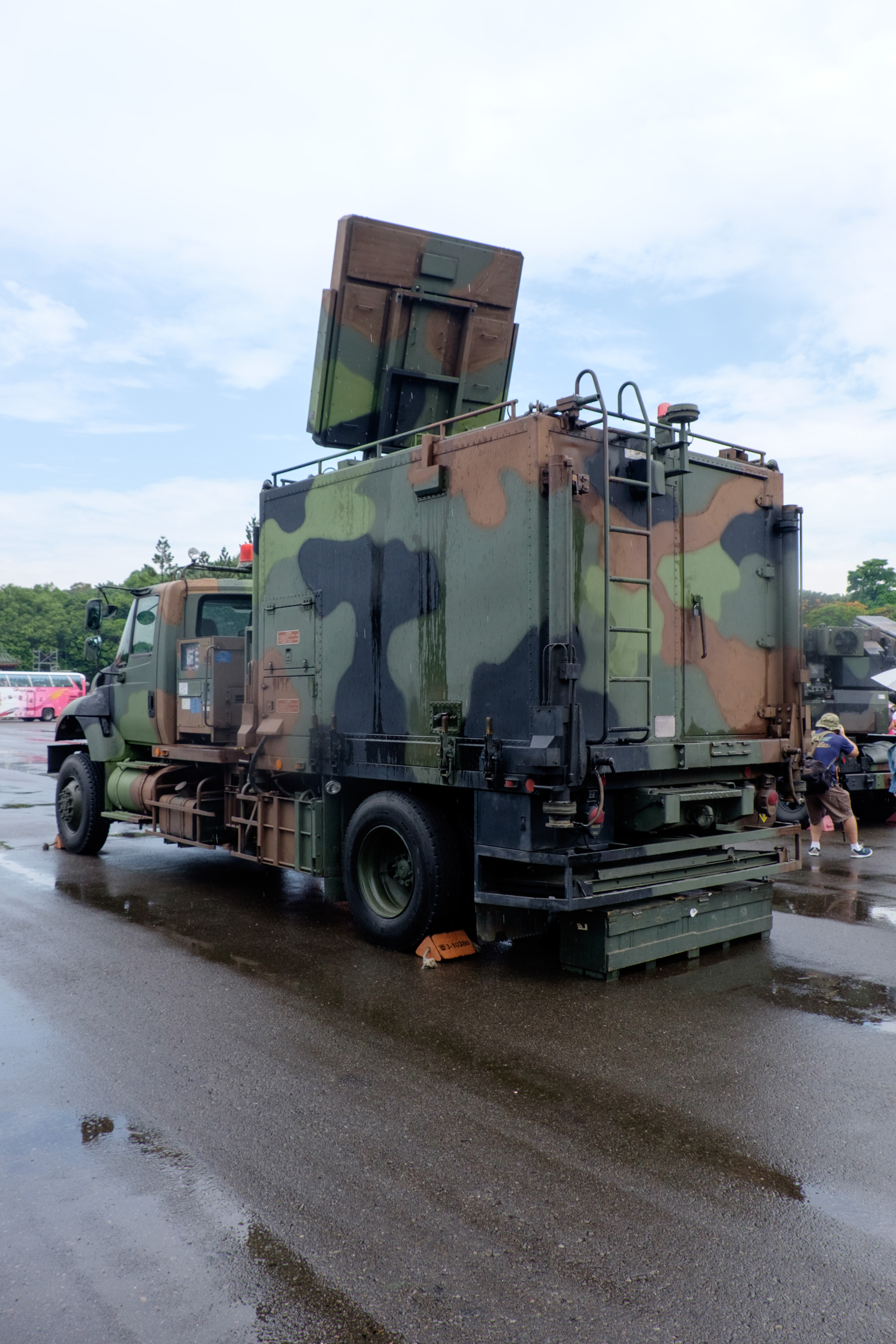
CS/MPQ-90 at Chengkungling Ground, 2015

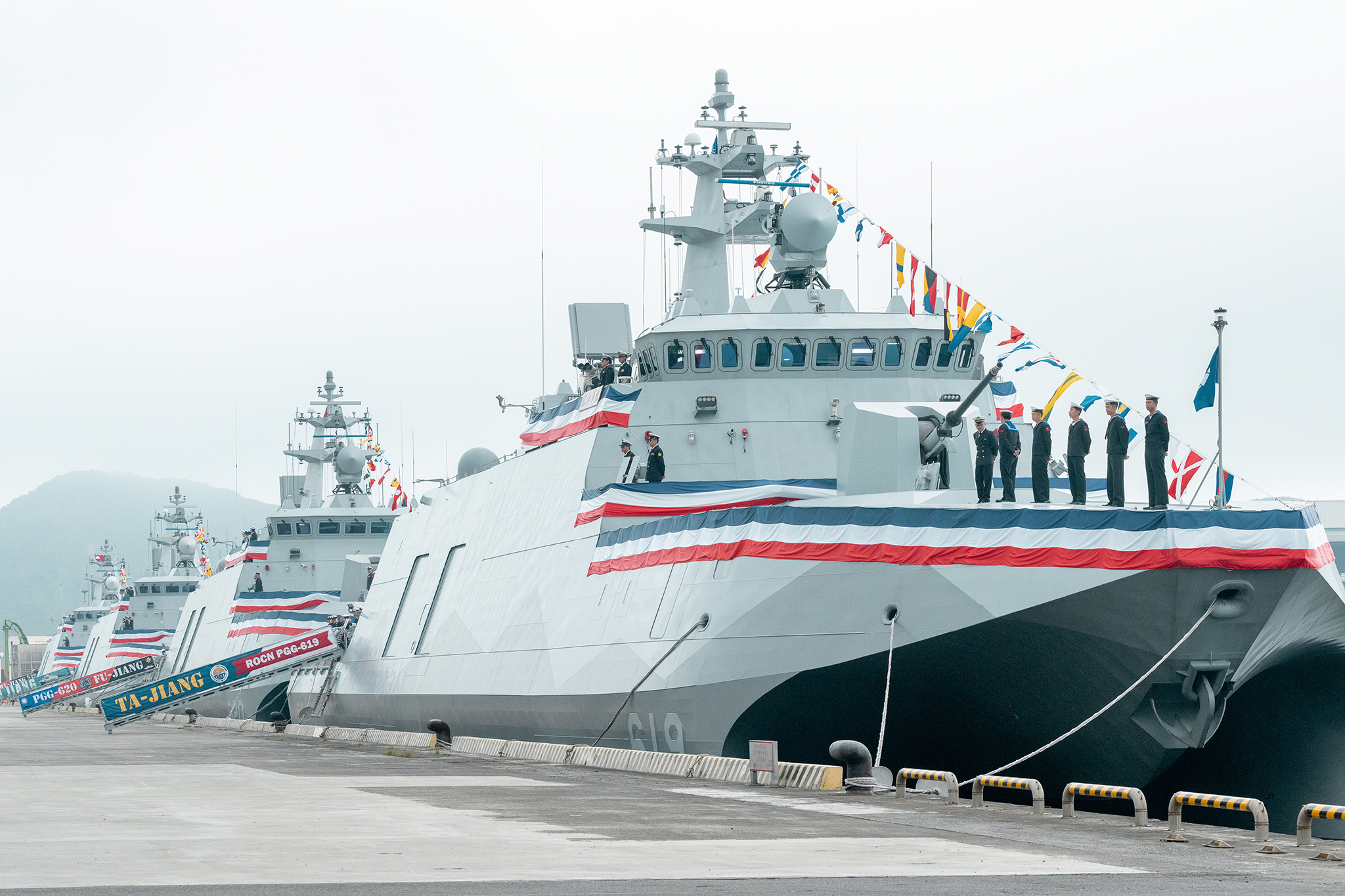
Sea Bee Eye aboard Tuo Chiang-class corvettes

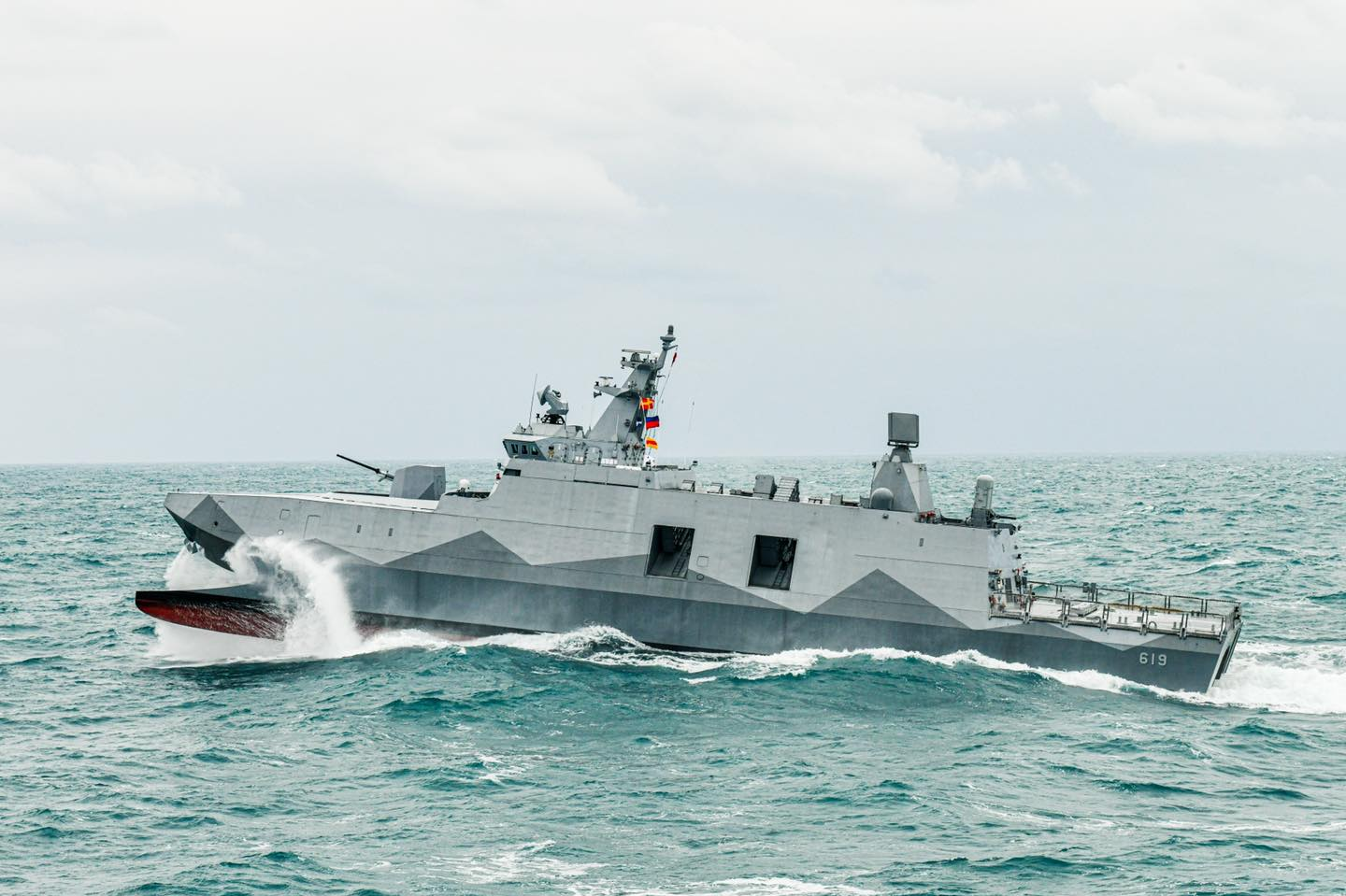
Sea Bee Eye aboard Ta Chiang (PGG-619)

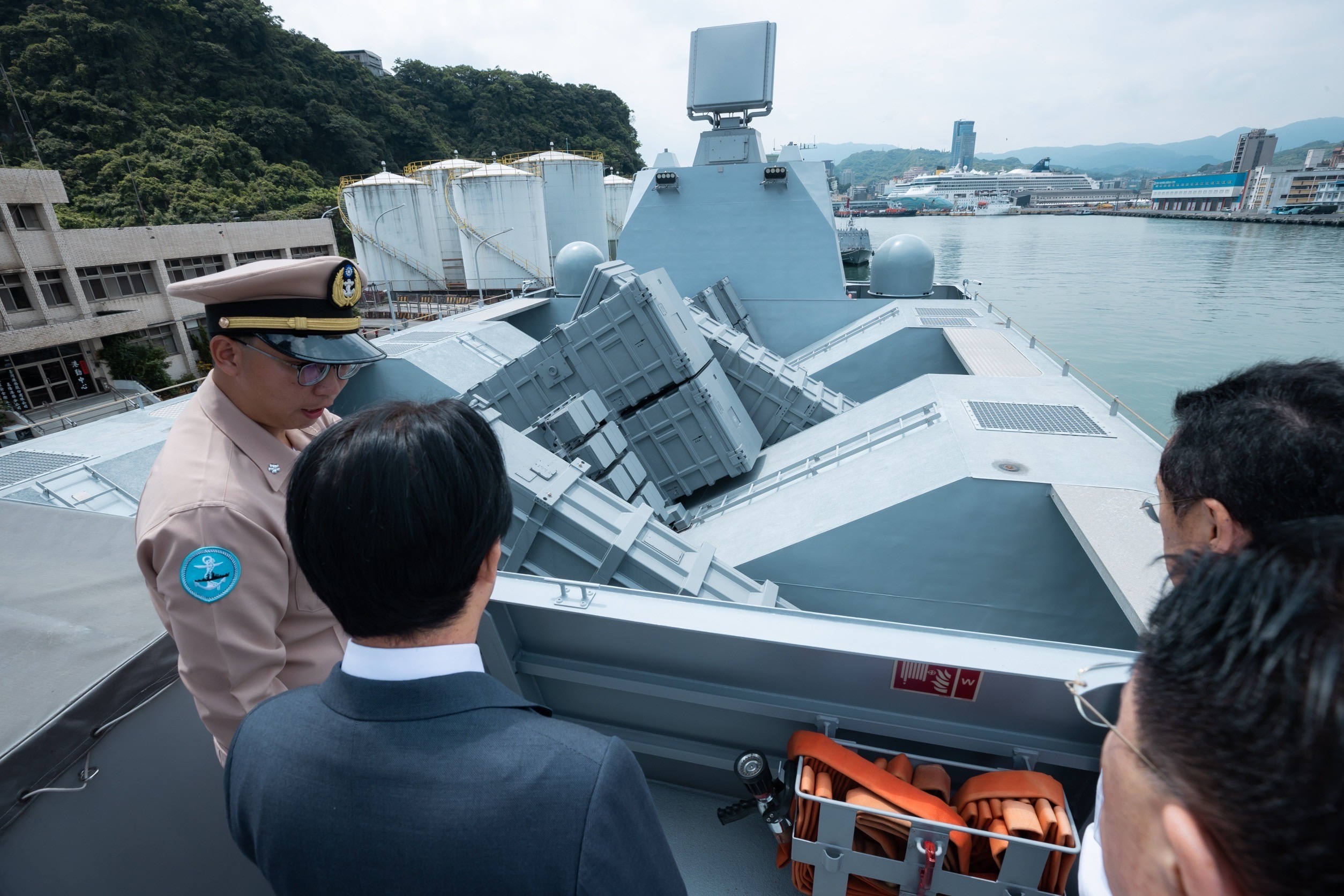
Sea Bee Eye aboard Hsu Chiang (PGG-621)

== See also ==
- AN/MPQ-64 Sentinel
- Giraffe radar
- Defense industry of Taiwan
