= USS Barbey =

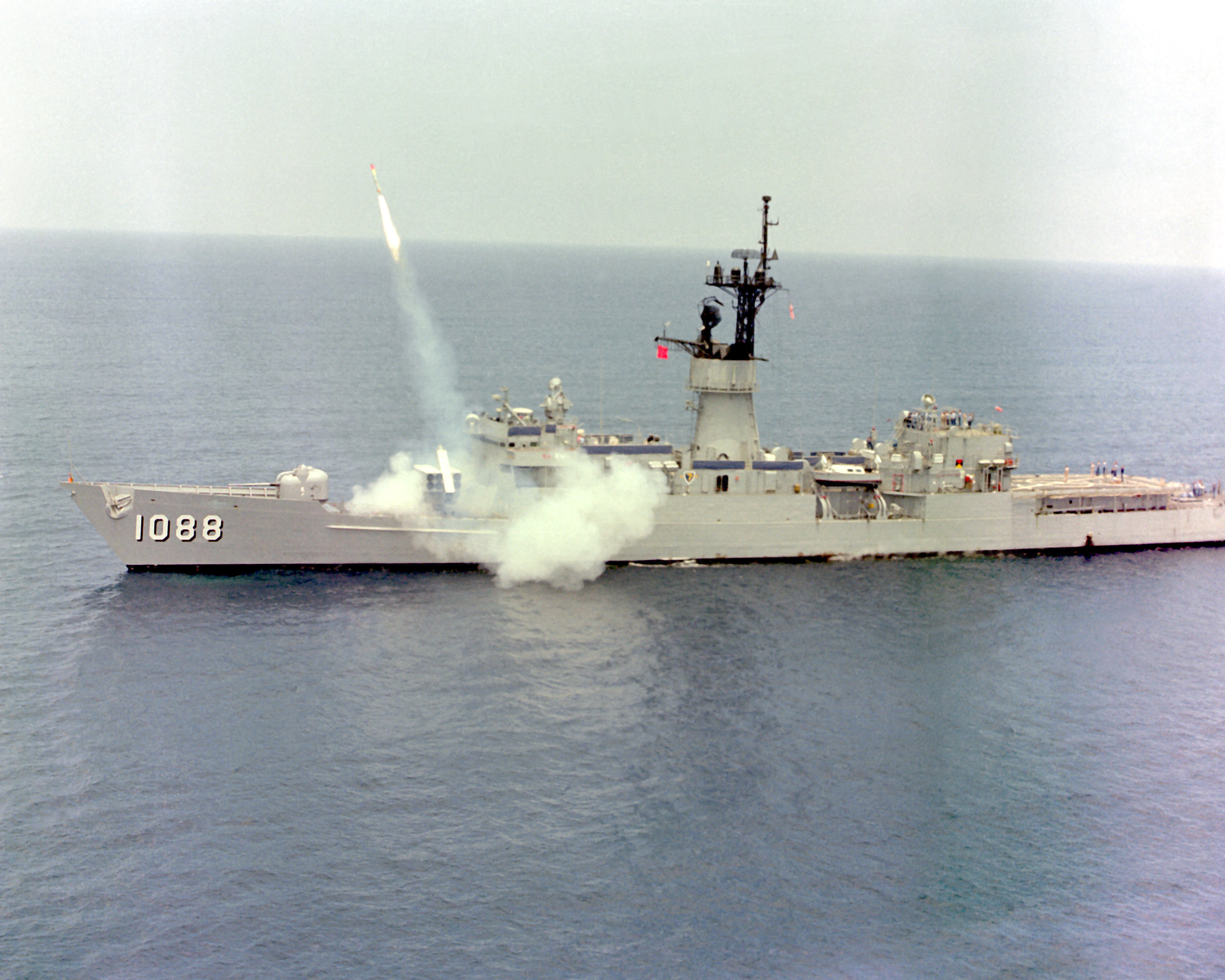
- USS Barbey firing an ASROC Blast Test Vehicle.

History

United States
- Ordered: 25 August 1966
- Builder: Avondale Shipyard, Westwego, Louisiana
- Laid down: 5 February 1971
- Launched: 4 December 1971
- Acquired: 15 October 1972
- Commissioned: 11 November 1972
- Decommissioned: 20 March 1992
- Stricken: 11 January 1995
- Fate: Sold to Taiwan 1999

History

Republic of China
- Name: ROCS Hwai Yang (FFG-937)
- Namesake: Huaiyang, Zhoukou
- Acquired: September 29 1999
- Fate: In service

General characteristics
- Class & type: Knox-class frigate
- Displacement: 3,214 tons (4,195 full load)
- Length: 438 ft (134 m)
- Beam: 46 ft 9 in (14.25 m)
- Draught: 24 ft 9 in (7.54 m)
- Propulsion: 2 × CE 1200psi boilers; 1 Westinghouse geared turbine; 1 shaft, 35,000 SHP (26 MW)
- Speed: over 27 knots
- Complement: 18 officers, 267 enlisted
- Sensors & processing systems: AN/SPS-40 Air Search Radar; AN/SPS-67 Surface Search Radar; AN/SQS-26 Sonar; AN/SQR-18 Towed array sonar system; Mk68 Gun Fire Control System
- Electronic warfare & decoys: AN/SLQ-32 Electronics Warfare System
- Armament: one Mk-16 8 cell missile launcher for ASROC and Harpoon missiles; one Mk-42 5-inch/54 caliber gun; Mark 46 torpedoes from four single tube launchers); one Phalanx CIWS
- Aircraft carried: one SH-2 Seasprite (LAMPS I) helicopter

USS Barbey (DE-1088/FF-1088) was a Knox-class frigate of the US Navy. Barbey (DE-1088) was laid down on 5 February 1972 by Avondale Shipyards, Inc., Westwego, La.; launched on 4 December 1971; sponsored by Mrs. Daniel E. Barbey, widow of Vice Admiral Barbey; and placed in commission at Long Beach Naval Shipyard on 11 November 1972.

== Operational history ==
=== Pacific ===
After fitting out and completing sea trials at Long Beach Naval Shipyard, Barbey got underway on 4 February 1973 for shakedown training in the Hawaiian Islands. Before post-shakedown availability at Long Beach, which commenced on 12 May, the ship enjoyed a three-day liberty at Acapulco, Mexico, plane guarded for Hancock and conducted acoustic tests at Seattle. The availability included a drydock period from 5 June to 9 October during which workers at Long Beach Naval Shipyard modified her flight deck and hangar to accommodate a light airborne multi-purpose system (LAMPS) helicopter and installed an experimental controllable-pitch propeller (CPP). Testing and adjusting the new propeller system occupied the ship through January 1974.

After further acoustic trials near Seattle in February and two days as plane guard for Hancock in early March, Barbey embarked the Commander, Destroyer Squadron 13, on 8 March for the joint U.S.-Canadian Navy exercise COMPTUEX 2B-74. During the next six days, the destroyer escort stood by to rescue pilots from Ranger. She returned to San Diego for upkeep and minor repairs which included the installation of a steel ball 35-feet in diameter on the helo hangar and the correction of an oil leak in the CPP hub. On 2 May, Cree towed her to drydock at the Long Beach Naval Shipyard for ten days of further repairs to her CPP. On 16 May, she returned to San Diego for local operations that included plane guarding for Constellation.

In late June, Barbey joined Plunger for three days of operations near Seattle before returning to San Diego on the 28th. On 12 July, the destroyer escort departed the west coast for several weeks of refresher training in Hawaii, her crew honing their antisubmarine warfare skills en route. On 30 August, following her return to San Diego, Barbey lost all of the blades of the CPP during tests and had to be towed by Florikan to Long Beach Naval Shipyard.

=== Redesignation ===
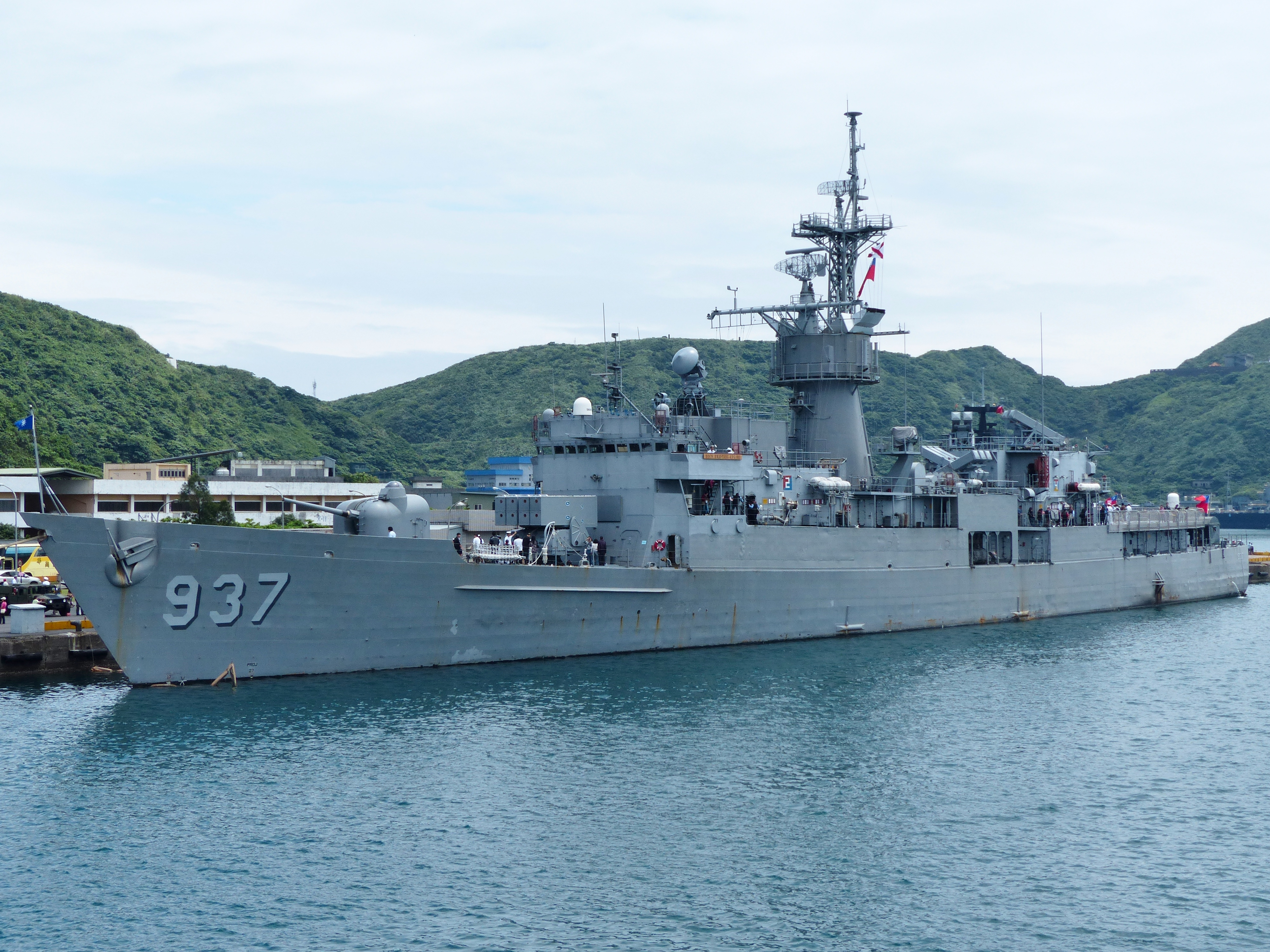
Hwai Yang Shipped in No.11 Pier of Zhongzheng Naval Base

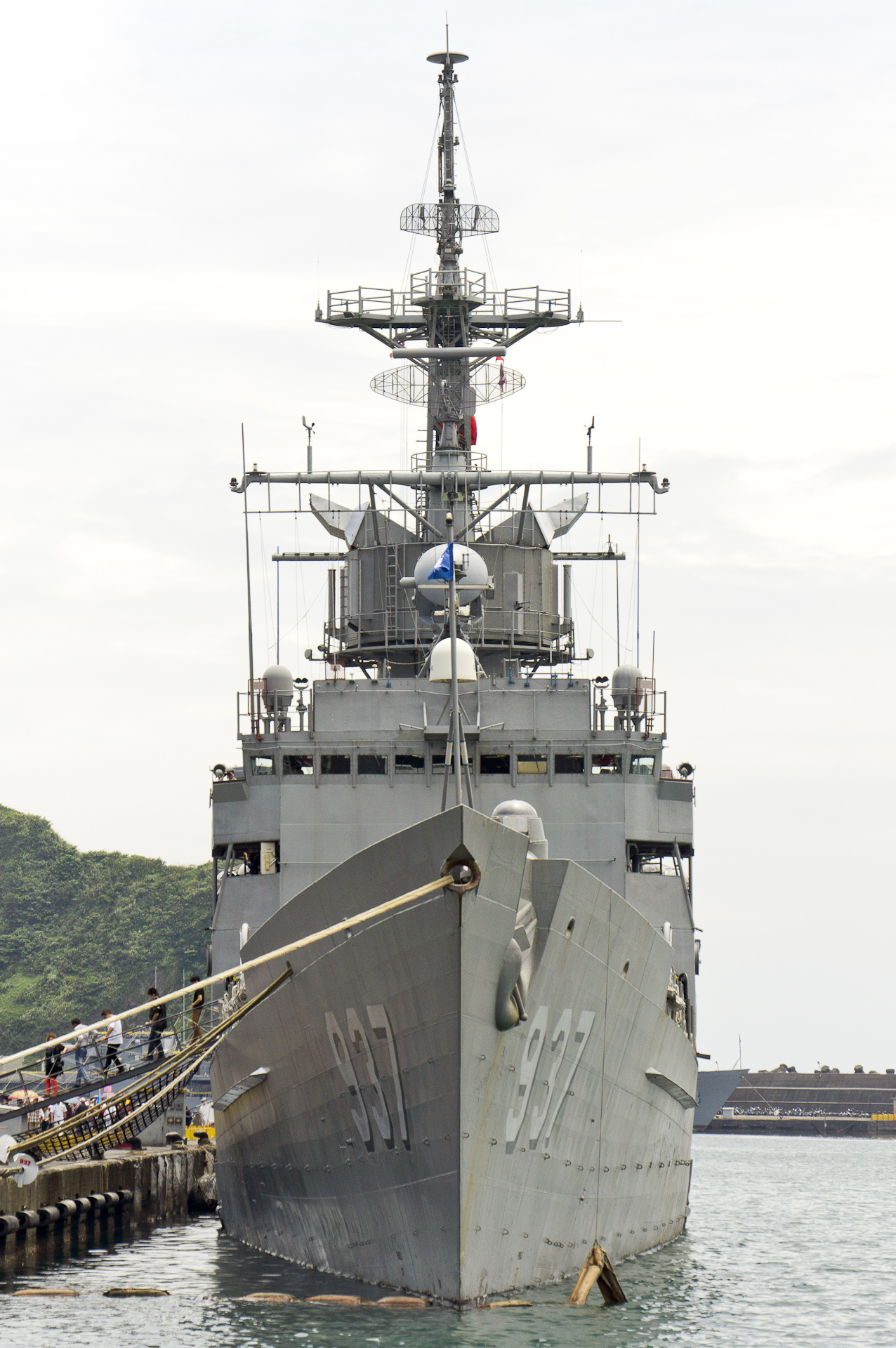
ROCN Hwai Yang, former USS Barbey

During the first six months of 1975, the warship reinstalled the CPP and subjected the new propeller to extensive trials at sea. During late May and early June, she interrupted this routine to undergo refresher training at Pearl Harbor prior to returning to San Diego. On 30 June 1975, Barbey and all other destroyer escorts were reclassified frigates, and she was redesignated FF-1088. Local operations, training, and upkeep kept the ship busy until 17 November when she commenced removal of the equipment associated with CNO project DS 523 (the 35-foot ball). During the first five days of December, Barbey conducted sonar sound trials and engineering drills before serving as an engineering and ASW school for most of the ensuing two weeks.

On 6 January 1976, the warship entered drydock at the Long Beach Naval Shipyard for repairs and modifications which primarily entailed the removal of the experimental CPP in favor of a standard, fixed-blade propeller. Following sea trials and deperming, Barbey conducted refresher training from 26 April to 7 May, then returned to San Diego for a month of preparation for upcoming inspections and tests. She completed a combat readiness test in mid-June before participating in readiness exercises in the eastern Pacific during the last week in June.

Tests, inspections, and training in preparation for her upcoming Pacific deployment consumed the entire month of July. On the 30th, the frigate embarked a detachment of ASW helicopters and got underway accompanied by Enterprise, Towers, Ramsey, Hull, Truxtun, and Scamp. Barbey took part in the exercise Comptuex 1-77 in the Hawaiian Islands and then put in at Pearl Harbor from the 12th to the 17th. During the frigate's passage to the Philippines, her crew guided the ship through multi-ship ASW exercises and various tactical drills. Following her arrival at Subic Bay on 6 September, nearly three weeks of intensive upkeep readied the warship for the combined Exercise "Kangaroo II" with the Australians off the east coast of Australia from 12 to 25 October. She visited Geelong, Australia during the first week of November before returning to Subic Bay for upkeep and replenishment until 11 December. The remainder of the deployment primarily involved exercises in the South China Sea. In December, the warship participated in ASW exercises, Exercise "Multiplex 1-77" and missile exercises, returned to Subic Bay for upkeep, and then closed out the year with a liberty call at Hong Kong. In mid-January 1977, Barbey served as plane guard for Enterprise during readiness exercises. Three weeks of upkeep and replenishment at Guam and briefings at Kaohsiung, Taiwan, preceded the ship's participation in the Exercise "Sharkhunt XX" in late February. Following a brief liberty at Kaohsiung and a sojourn at Subic Bay, the frigate returned to San Diego, where she arrived on 21 March.

During the first two weeks of June, the warship sailed to the Pacific northwest for tactical exercises and a goodwill visit to Portland, Oreg. With the exception of a brief respite at Aberdeen, Wash., in mid-October, she remained in or near San Diego for the remainder of the year engaging in various exercises and drills designed to maintain the ship in a high state of readiness. On 23 January 1978, Barbey commenced an eleven-month overhaul at Long Beach Naval Shipyard, which became her homeport while the overhaul lasted. During the overhaul, the warship received a Harpoon missile system among the improvements to her combat systems and engineering plant. In late November and early December, Barbey conducted sea trials to assess her engineering and sonar capabilities.

Upkeep, training, and drills occupied the ship through the first half of 1979 culminating in the successful completion of her operational propulsion plant examination (OPPE) in late June. In July, the ship underwent refresher training until a problem with the emergency diesel generator forced her to return to San Diego for another overhaul on the 27th. Upon completion of the overhaul on 24 September until mid-October, Barbey participated in fleet exercises which she interrupted for a brief liberty at New Westminster, British Columbia. Following a month of upkeep at San Diego, she completed readiness exercises in November, including a combat systems readiness test, and the Exercise "Comptuex 1-80" in early December as a prelude to her upcoming Pacific deployment.

On 11 January 1980, Barbey set sail for Pearl Harbor where she became a dedicated escort of a forming Thirty First Marine Expeditionary Unit, along with the guided missile cruiser Gridley in support of three three marines who served as reserve for Operation Eagle Claw in Iran 24 April. All hands received respective Expeditionary Medals. Diego Garcia atoll on 5 May. Barbey began the return voyage to San Diego which included stops at Fremantle, Australia; Subic Bay, Guam, and Pearl Harbor. After arriving at San Diego on 12 July, she resumed the usual routine of upkeep, availability, inspections, and training during the remainder of 1980.

In June 1990 Barbey sailed from her homeport of San Diego on a regularly scheduled deployment to the Persian Gulf. During her transit to the Western Pacific she made port visits in Hawaii, the Philippines, Singapore and Penang, Malaysia. She arrived at her destination on 1 August 1990. Barbey and her crew transitioned from a peacetime deployment in a moderate threat environment, to a wartime deployment when the forces of Iraq, under the orders of Saddam Hussein, invaded the Emirate of Kuwait.e Barbey, and her sailing mate for the transit, USS England, were immediately employed in Naval Operations to enforce the sanctions specified by UN Resolutions. During her deployment in the AG, Barbey and her embarked helicopter detachment, HSL-35 "Magus 32" provided support for the UN Resolutions and performed more surface ship interdiction intercepts than any other fleet unit in the AG during the period. Throughout the buildup of forces in support of Operation Desert Shield, Barbey's assets were utilized in interdiction and escort operations until she was relieved by USS Marvin Shields. Upon detaching from COMMIDEASTFOR she made her way back home with stops in the Philippines, Hong Kong and Hawaii. Barbey arrived in San Diego on 21 December 1990 and commenced a repair availability.

In April 1991 Barbey deployed in support of Law Enforcement and Drug Interdiction Operations to the coast of Baja California and Central Mexico. During this period Barbey's crew and her embarked Helicopter detachment SH2-F "Sea Snake 11" conducted three at sea rescues, of which, two were from merchant ships of foreign registry. Upon completion of her LEO assignment Barbey participated in several fleet exercises and then entered another repair availability.

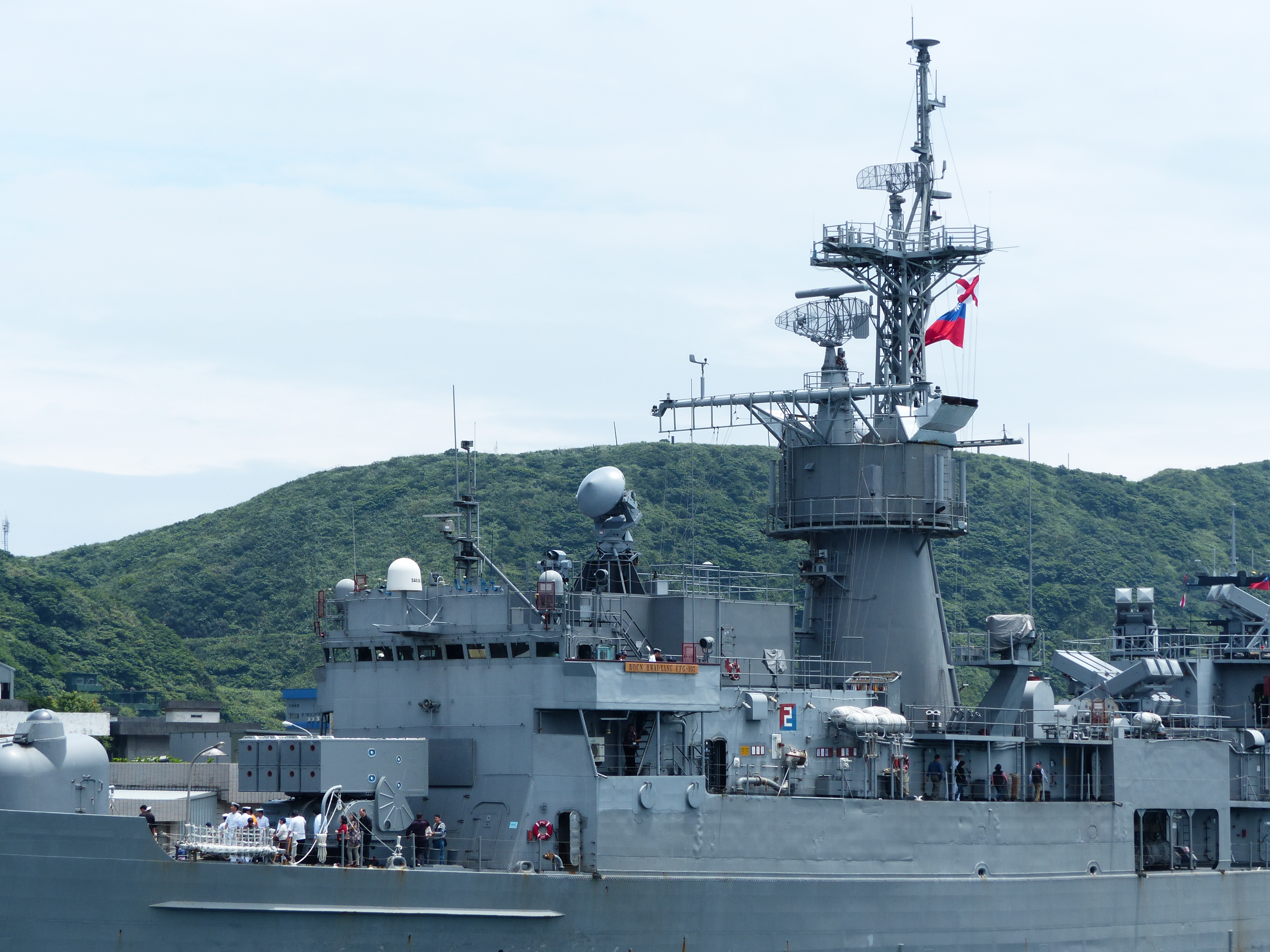
ROCN Hwai Yang (FFG-937)

Barbey was decommissioned on 20 March 1992 and struck from the Navy list on 11 January 1995. She was disposed of through the Security Assistance Program, foreign military sale to Taiwan on 29 September 1999, where she served as ROCS Hwai Yang (FFG-937).

=== In Taiwanese service ===
In mid-2009, the Hwai Yang warship completed the "Wusanhua" project modification.

During Typhoon Nissa in 2017, the Lan Yang and Hwai yang, which were anchored at Keelung Port, were protected from damage by wind and waves with the assistance of the Republic of China Navy and Coast Guard officers and soldiers. However, the civilian ferry "Lina" anchored behind the two ships was unexpectedly damaged by the strong wind and waves, causing the ropes to break, drifting forward and colliding with the Hwai Yang and Lan Yang. The sterns of the two ships were damaged, the railings of the helicopter pad were broken, and the stern radar detection line was broken. After inspection and evaluation by the Republic of China Navy and Taiwan Shipbuilding, it will take at least two months to complete the repair, and the repair cost is about NT$1 million. The Republic of China Navy decided to claim compensation from the ferry company in accordance with the instructions of the Ministry of National Defense.

A naval version of the CS/MPQ-90 Bee Eye radar known as the "Sea Bee Eye" was installed aboard ROCN Hwai Yang (FFG-937) for testing with the TC-2N missile.
