= Kukuliškiai =

- Kukuliškiai
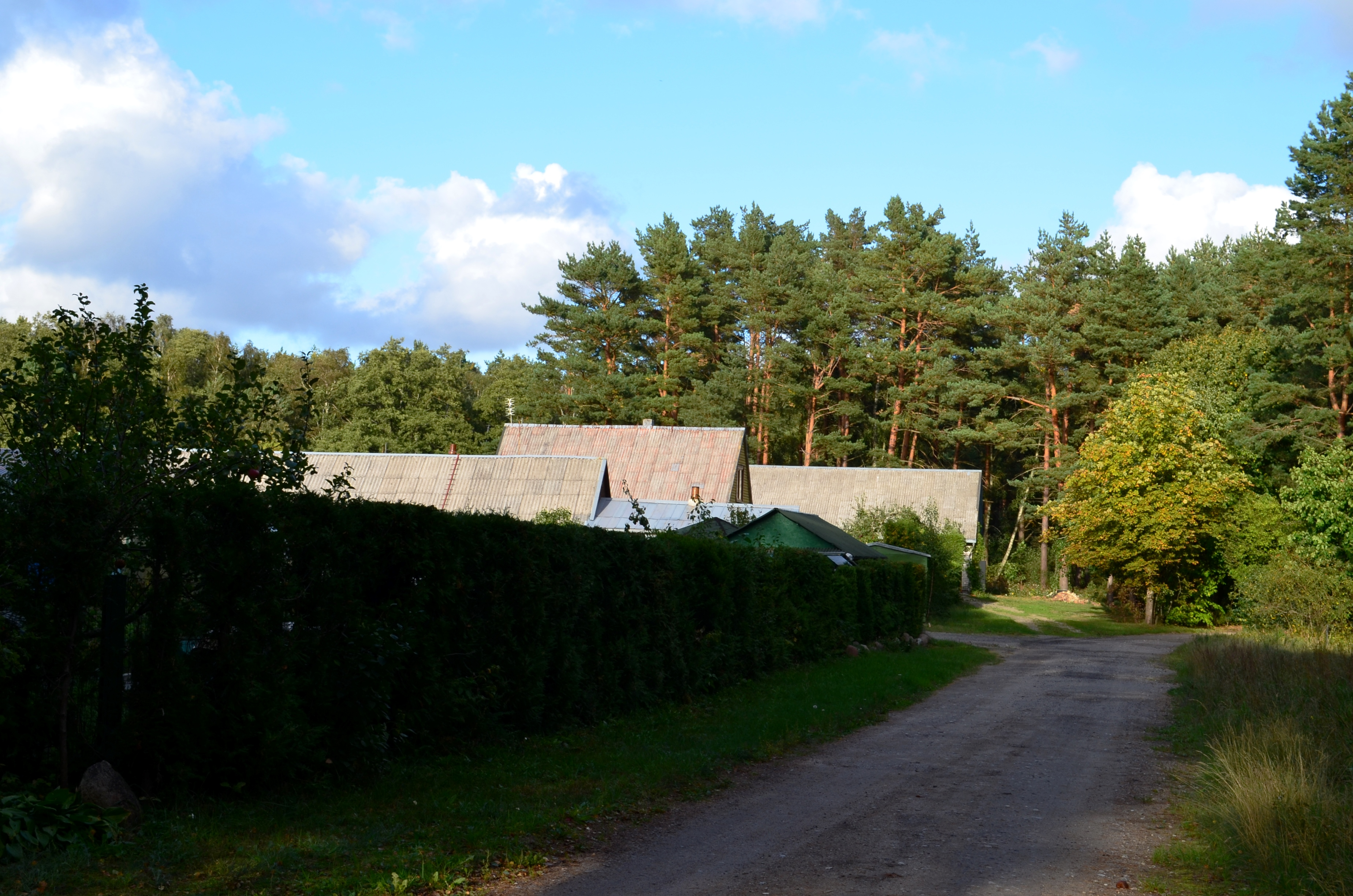
- view of Kukuliškiai

- Location of Kukuliškiai
- Coordinates: 55°46′51.6″N 21°5′9.6″E
- Country: Lithuania
- Ethnographic region: Lithuania Minor
- County: Klaipėda County
- Municipality: Klaipėda District Municipality
- Eldership: Kretingalė Eldership

Population (2021)
  - Total: 25
- Time zone: UTC+2 (EET)
  - Summer (DST): UTC+3 (EEST)
- Climate: Dfb

Kukuliškiai is a village in the south of the Klaipėda County in western Lithuania. The village was part of the Klaipėda Region and ethnographic Lithuania Minor.

== History ==
In 1939, following the annexation of the Klaipėda Region by Nazi Germany, a German coastal artillery battery was constructed at Kukuliškiai (also known as the Karklė Battery) as part of the coastal defence system of the Baltic Sea. Built to standard German naval fortification designs, the complex consisted of a central reinforced-concrete fire-control bunker flanked by two artillery blocks, each containing gun emplacements, ammunition magazines and crew quarters. One of the artillery blocks was partially restored in 2002 on the initiative of the Seaside Regional Park. Since 2009, the park administration and military history enthusiasts from Klaipėda have developed the site as a heritage attraction, assembling exhibitions on the region's fortifications. In the same year, excavations uncovered the barrel of a rare 12.8 cm FlaK 40 anti-aircraft gun, one of only a handful known to survive worldwide.

=== Archaeological sites ===
In 2016, archaeologists uncovered the prehistoric Kukuliškiai hillfort and settlement, one of the most significant archaeological discoveries in the region in recent decades. Excavations revealed the remains of a fortified settlement dating to the Late Bronze Age, providing valuable evidence of prehistoric habitation along the Baltic coast. The site included traces of defensive earthworks, dwellings, hearths, and numerous artefacts, offering insights into the daily life, economy, and social organisation of the communities that occupied the area. The discovery has contributed substantially to understanding prehistoric settlement patterns in western Lithuania and the wider southeastern Baltic region.

== Demography ==
=== Historical population ===
Historical population

Year	Pop.	±% p.a.
1959	40	—
1970	51	+2.23%
1979	80	+5.13%
1989	39	−6.93%

Year	Pop.	±% p.a.
2001	45	+1.20%
2011	40	−1.17%
2021	25	−4.59%

Source: 1902, 1923, 1959 & 1970, 1979, 1989, 2001, 2011
