= Latvian Air Force =

Air warfare branch of Latvia's military

- Latvijas Gaisa spēki
- Emblem of the Latvian Air Force
- Active: 1919–1940; 1992 – present
- Country: Latvia
- Type: Air force
- Role: Aerial warfare
- Size: 251 personnel
- Part of: Latvian National Armed Forces
- Mottos: Visu par Latviju; (English: "All for Latvia")
- Engagements: Latvian War of Independence

Commanders
- Commander: Colonel Edmunds Svenčs

Insignia
- Roundel

- Fin flash

Aircraft flown
- Helicopter: UH-60 Black Hawk
- Trainer: Pelegrin Tarragon
- Transport: An-2

Latvian Air Force (Latvian: Latvijas Gaisa spēki) is the aviation branch of the National Armed Forces. The first air force units were established in 1919 and re-established in 1992. It has no air combat capability, thus the defense of Latvian air space is maintained by NATO, with rotating detachments of four aircraft to Lithuania at four-monthly intervals (see Baltic Air Policing).

== History ==
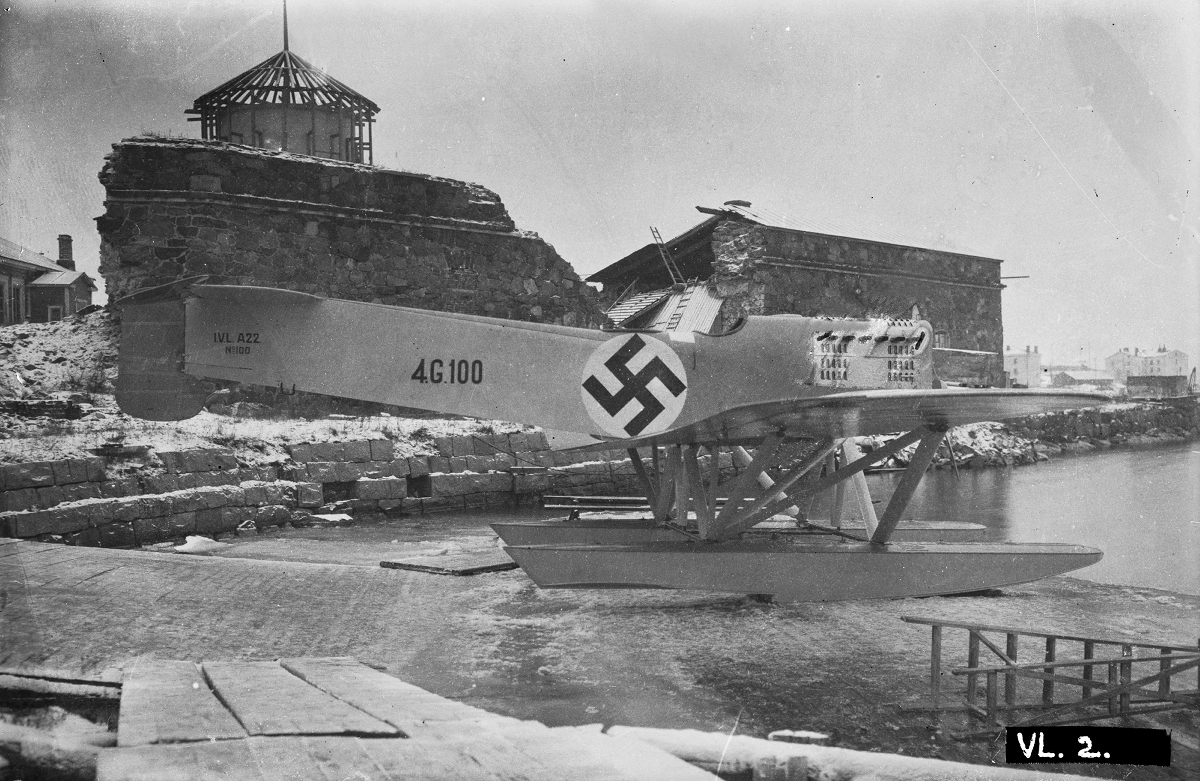
Latvian IVL A.22 Hansa

National Guard (1993–2000)

Latvian Air Force (1919–1940)

Aizsargi organization (1937–1940)

=== 1919–1940 ===
The Latvian Air Force was first founded during the Latvian War of Independence. On 7 June 1919 an Air Group was formed, commanded by Lt. Alfrēds Valeika. The first aircraft were former Bolshevik Nieuport 24bis and Sopwith 1½ Strutter, both seized from German forces. They first flew on 5 August 1919, and accomplished the first bombing mission on 26 August 1919. From September the air force had three aircraft, and took part in fighting against the Germans and White Russians. Another 7–8 aircraft were seized and repaired after defeating of Russo-German forces, and 7 Sopwith Camels and 3 Sopwith 1½ Strutters were received from the British in December 1919. The Latvian Air Force flew 69 missions during the War of Independence. In the years to follow many more aircraft were added to the inventory and the Air Group was eventually renamed the Aviation Regiment in 1926. An interesting feat of the Latvian naval aviation was a 6000-km trip to England and back, by three Fairey Seal floatplanes, in 1936.

In 1939, the Aviation Regiment consisted of three fighter squadrons, armed with 24 Gloster Gladiator and 6 Bristol Bulldog (a fourth squadron was in organization), three reconnaissance squadrons, armed with up to 12 Letov Š-16LS, 2 Hawker Hind and 10 Stampe SV.5, and a naval reconnaissance squadron with 4 Fairey Seal and two other planes. In 1939, Latvia ordered and paid for 30 British Hawker Hurricane fighters, but due to the country being overrun, they were never delivered. By 1940, there were almost 130 aircraft in service.

A separate, mostly light aircraft Aviation Regiment of the Aizsargi organization also existed parallel to the air force until the Soviet occupation. In addition to biplanes, it also purchased planes locally produced by the VEF factory, e.g. at least four I-12 trainers in 1938.

The roundel of the air force since 1919 was a maroon-red ugunskrusts, with the Aizsargi Aviation Regiment adopting an auseklis symbol as their insignia (which was replicated by the National Guard airmen later in the 1990s).

In 1940, the Aviation Regiment and the Latvian Armed Forces were dissolved after the Soviet occupation of Latvia and some aircraft and personnel were pressed into service of the Soviet Air Force.

=== Since 1992 ===
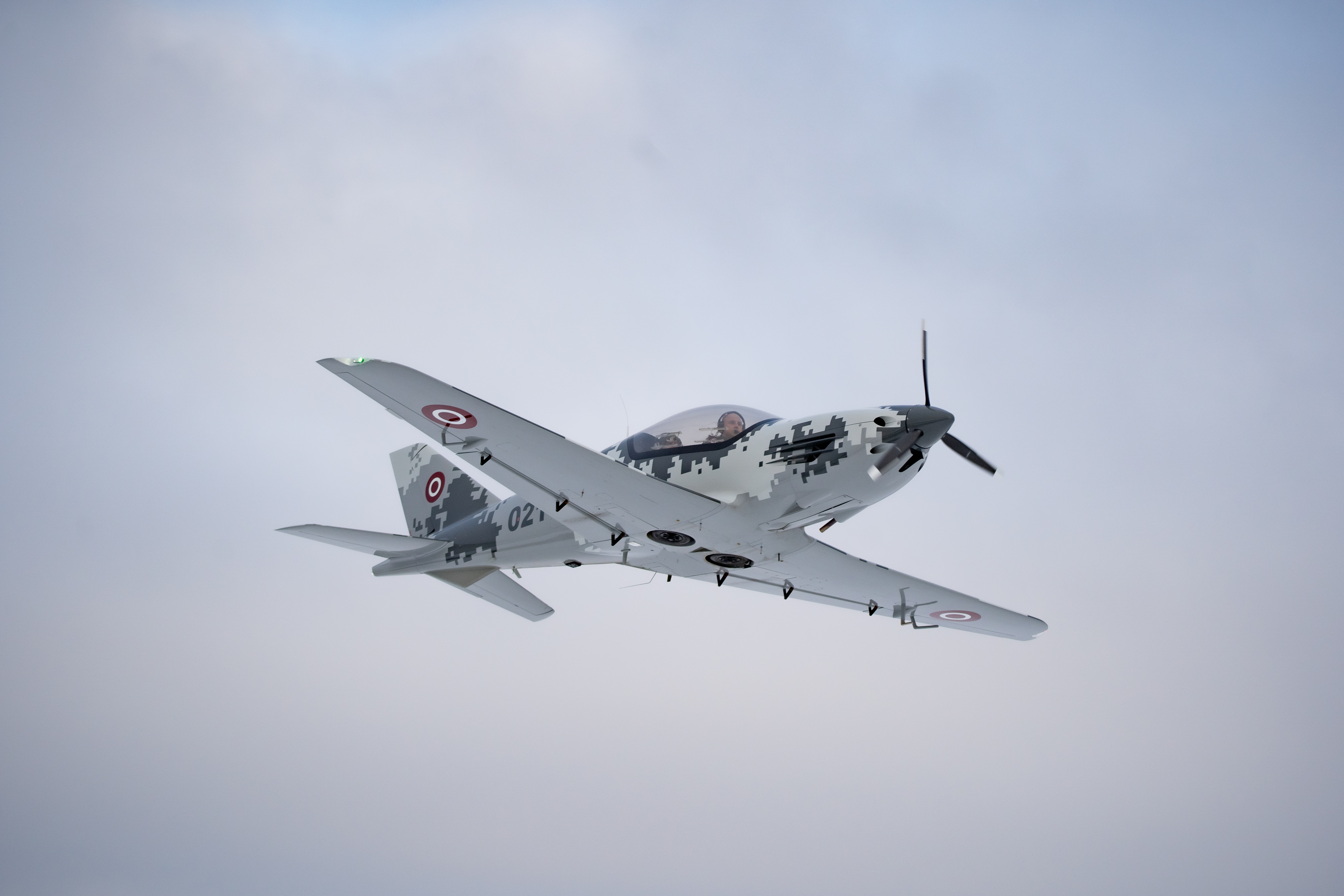
Pelegrin Tarragon TR-91 trainer

The post-Soviet Latvian Air Force was formed on 24 February 1992 at Spilve Airport. In August 1994 the air force moved to the ex-Soviet Lielvārde Air Base. As the withdrawing Soviet Air Force did not leave any aircraft in Latvia, the first aircraft operated by the air force were four Polish PZL Mi-2U helicopters that were received from civilian aviation in 1992. These were supplemented with two Let L-410UVP utility planes donated by Germany in 1993, however, one was lost in a 1995 accident in Lielvārde. Six PZL-104 Wilga-35A trainer aircraft from ex-DOSAAF stocks were mostly used by the Aviation Component of the Latvian National Guard since March 1993. Similarly, the Component acquired around 20 LET L-13 Blaník, three SZD-48-3 Jantar Standard 3 and three LAK-12 gliders.

In the beginning of the 21st century two new and heavier Mi-8MTV Hip helicopters were bought. Both helicopters are fitted with search and rescue equipment, but are also used for transportation of troops, evacuation and support of the Special Forces. In 2000, the Aviation Component of the National Guard was merged into the air force.

In 2004 the Ministry of Defense bought two more Mi-8MTVs at the Russian Ulan Ude helicopter (rework) factory. These two might replace the first two, because of the limited flying time left on the first two examples. One Mi-8MTV is normally at SAR stand-by in Riga, which is closer to the sea than Lielvārde. In 2004, the air force commenced the modernization of the surface air defense capabilities by signing a contract regarding procurement of RBS-70 missiles.

In 2005, soldiers of the Air Force Air Defense Wing started the respective training course. One Air Defense Battery was to be supplied with the armament; and the personnel training of the Air Defense Wing was completed by the end of 2007.

It was planned to accommodate all the air force units at the Lielvārde military base in the near future. AF Air Operations Center was opened in 2009. Renovation of the air base was finished by 2014.

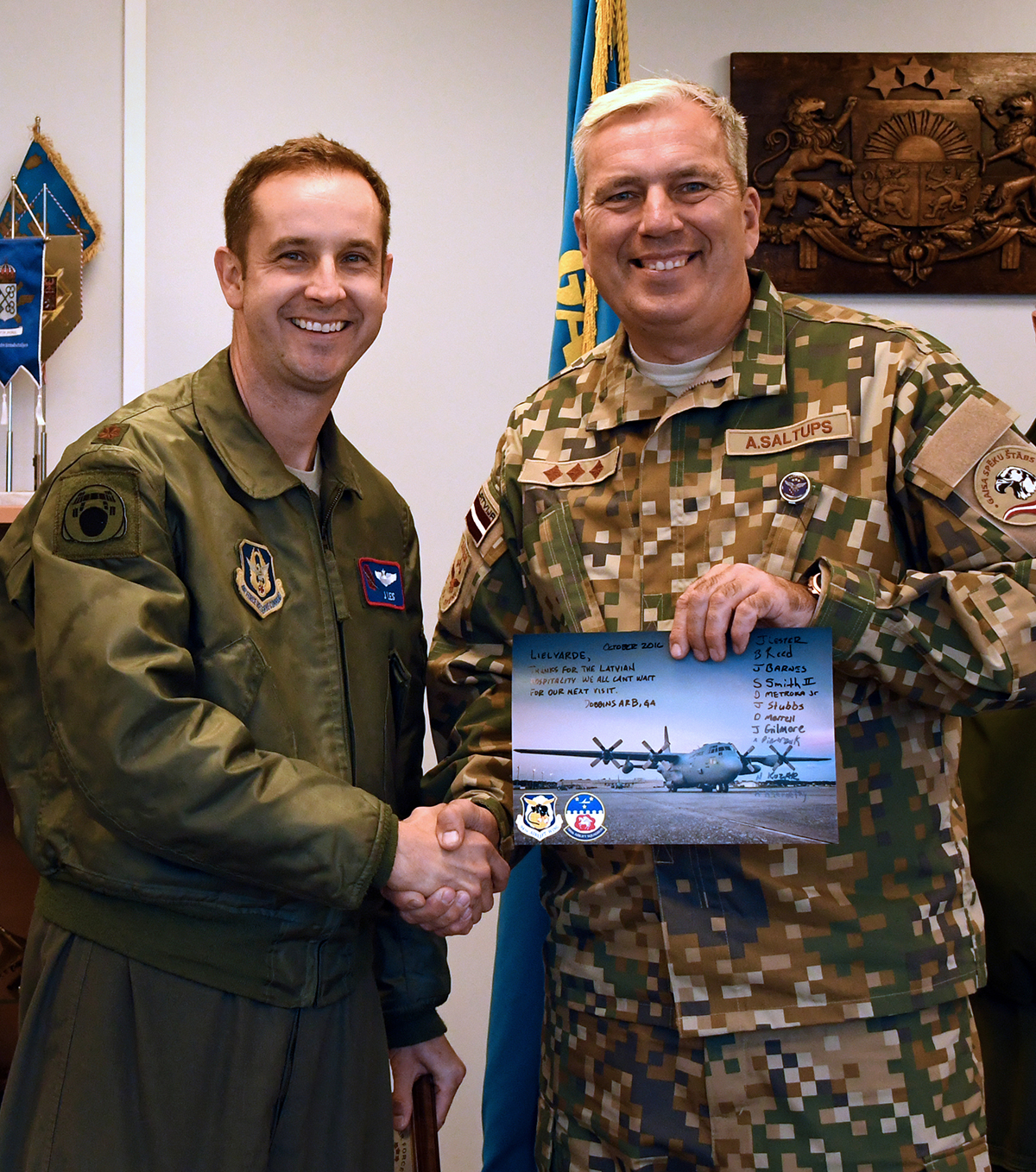
Latvian Air Force commander Col. Armands Saltups with a major of the U.S. Air Force 700th Airlift Squadron in 2016

In July 2018, it was reported that the Ministry of Defence was planning to buy four helicopters for search and rescue, evacuation, and firefighting operations. On August 3, 2018, the US State Department issued a news release, stating that it had approved a possible Foreign Military Sale of four UH-60M Black Hawk helicopters to Latvia. On September 11, 2018, an intergovernmental agreement with the United States for the acquisition of the four UH-60M helicopters was concluded by the Cabinet of Ministers. The first deliveries would take place at the end of 2022.

In May 2020, Ministry of Defence announced plans to renovate three of four An-2. One aircraft is already in use, which was completely refurbished in 2016. The second refurbished An-2 was received in August 2020 and the third in December 2021, with plans to modernize the fourth An-2 within two years. In September 2021, the air force signed a contract for the purchase of two locally made ultralight Pelegrin Tarragons with delivery planned in 2022 and 2023.

Following the Russian invasion of Ukraine in 2022, Latvia has donated to Ukraine 2 Mil Mi-8MTV-1 transport helicopters, 2 Mil Mi-2 transport helicopters and 2 Mi-17 helicopters.Latvia also introduced conscription, air force being on of the places where conscripts can serve 11 months.

Freed up funds have allowed the Ministry of Defence to purchase four MD 530F Cayuse Warrior light helicopters; delivery date is planned to be between 2026 and 2027. In March 2026 Latvia cancelled the order for the four MD530F, after re-evaluation of its needs.

== Mission ==
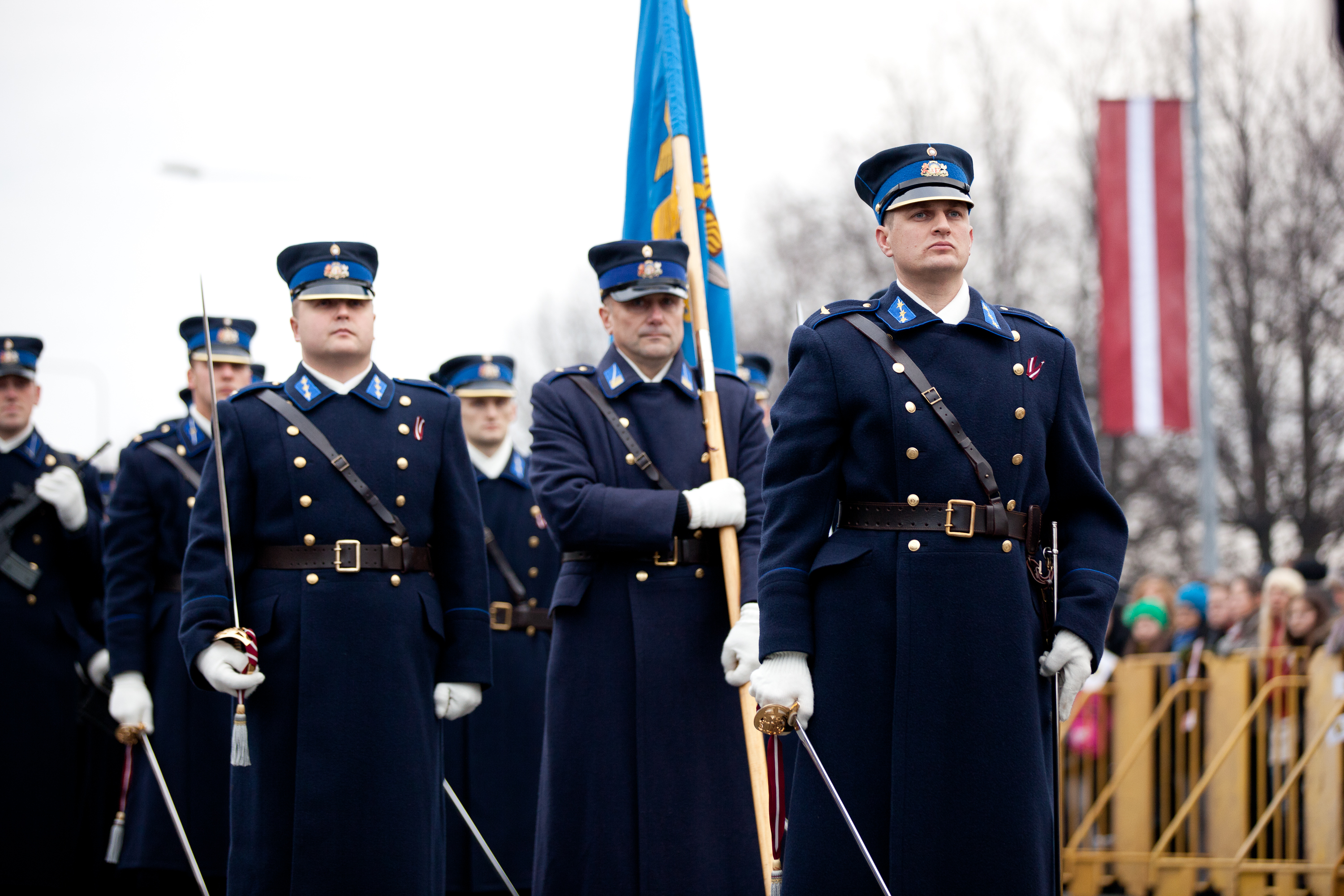
Servicemembers at the Lāčplēsis Day parade in 2011

The air force carries out Latvian airspace surveillance, control and defense, provides air defense support to the Land Forces units and participates in search and rescue operations over the Baltic Sea, the Gulf of Riga and dry land. They also transport NAF soldiers and cargo, provide transport for the State President, as well as other high-level Latvian and foreign officials during their visits to Latvia and abroad. AF aircraft also assist other NAF units, the Interior Ministry and the Crisis Medicine Centre. The air force carries out the national airspace surveillance by military radars included in its armament.

One of the key priorities for the development of the AF is their integration into the NATO Air Defense System. The modernization of air defense equipment and the training of personnel is carried out with this purpose in mind. Enhancing the Air Space Surveillance System, developing a search and rescue helicopter subdivision and personnel training are also included on this list of priorities. air force helicopters in co-operation with the Disaster Medicine Center also transport patients in grave condition, persons injured in accidents and persons injured in traffic accidents from rural regions to Riga hospitals.

Development of the Lielvārde military base will ensure centralization of air force units and establishment of an efficient command and control system, which will result in a reduction of the maintenance costs of the air force units.

The main mission of air force is to:

- Provide for the control and defense of the national air space;
- Provide combat and mobilization readiness for units;
- Participate in people and object search and rescue operations;
- Perform air transportation duties and air defense.

== Organization ==
Latvian Air Force locations 2018:
Air Base AN/TPS-77(V) Radar Station
- Air Force Headquarters, at Lielvārde Air Base
  - Airspace Surveillance Squadron, at Lielvārde Air Base
    - Air Operations Center, at Lielvārde Air Base, reports to the Baltic Air Surveillance Network's Regional Airspace Surveillance Coordination Center, in Karmėlava in Lithuania
    - 1st Radiotechnical (Radar) Post, at Lielvārde Air Base, with a fixed AN/TPS-77 radar
    - 2nd Radiotechnical (Radar) Post, in Audriņi, with a fixed AN/TPS-77 radar
    - 3rd Radiotechnical (Radar) Post, in Čalas, with a fixed AN/TPS-77 radar
    - Mobile Radar Section, with a mobile AN/TPS-77 radar
    - Signal Section
    - Engineer Section
    - Security Platoon
  - Aviation Squadron, at Lielvārde Air Base
    - Squadron Staff
    - Helicopter Section (UH-60 Black Hawk helicopters)
    - Rescue Section (UH-60 Black Hawk helicopters)
    - Transport Plane Section (An-2 aircraft)
    - Training Section
    - Aircraft Maintenance Section
  - Air-defence Battalion, at Lielvārde Air Base
    - Staff and Supply Battery
    - 3× Air-defence batteries (Each with: 1× Radar Platoon with Giraffe radar, 3× Air-defence platoons with RBS 70 man-portable air-defense systems, 1× Support Platoon, 1× Signal Platoon)
  - Air Force Base, at Lielvārde Air Base (manages the support units at Lielvārde Air Base)
  - Air Force Training Center, at Lielvārde Air Base
  - Air Force Guard Company, at Lielvārde Air Base (trains the Air Force's National Guard personnel)

== Inventory ==
=== Current ===
Aircraft	Origin	Type	Variant	In service	Photo	Notes
Planes
Antonov An-2	Soviet Union	Transport		4		
Pelegrin Tarragon	Latvia	Basic trainer		2		Also used for reconnaissance
Embraer A-29 Super Tucano	Brazil	Light attack		?		Acquisition is still in talks
Helicopters
Sikorsky UH-60 Black Hawk	United States	Utility	UH-60M	4		Used for medical evacuation, SOF transport and trainigs

==== Retired ====
Previous aircraft flown since 1991 were Let L-410UVP Turbolet, PZL-104 Wilga 35-A, Mil Mi-8MTV, Mi-17 and the PZL Mi-2U.

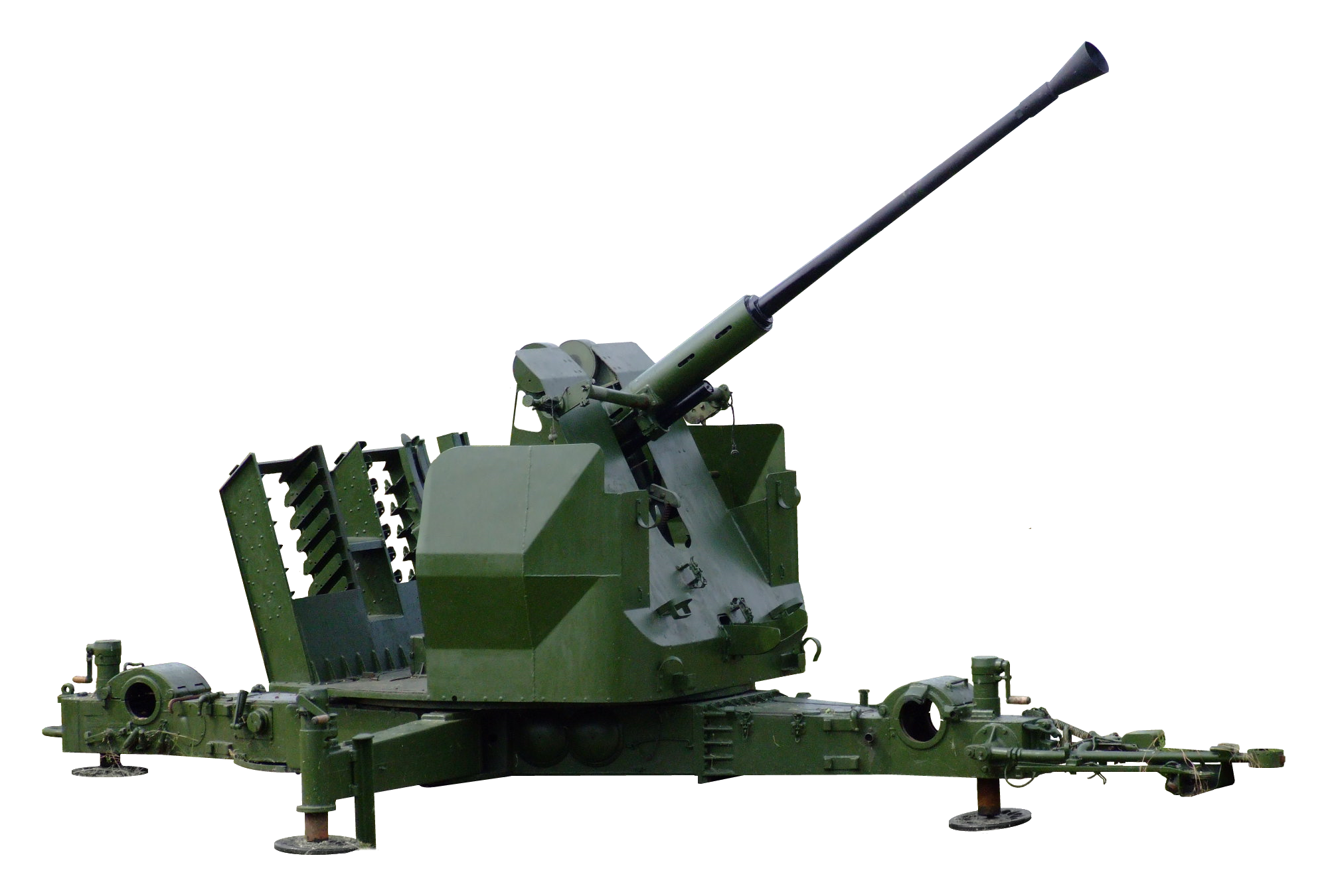
The Bofors 40 mm L/70 anti-aircraft gun

=== Air defense ===
Name	Origin	Type	Notes
Anti-aircraft weapons
PPZR Piorun	Poland	MANPADS	Also in use by Latvian Land Forces
RBS-70	Sweden	MANPADS	
Bofors 40 mm L/60 and L/70	Sweden	Towed anti-aircraft gun	L60 and L70 variants
Radars
PS-70	Sweden	Short-range radar	AKA Giraffe 40
Giraffe 1X	Sweden	Short-range radar	
TPS-77 MRR	United States	Long-range radar	Mobile radar
AN/TPS-77	United States	Long-range radar	

== Ranks ==
=== Commissioned officer ranks ===
The following are the current insignia of commissioned officers.

NATO code	OF-10	OF-9	OF-8	OF-7	OF-6	OF-5	OF-4	OF-3	OF-2	OF-1
Latvian Air Force
Latvian Air Force			Ģenerālleitnants	Ģenerālmajors	Brigādes ģenerālis	Pulkvedis	Pulkvežleitnants	Majors	Kapteinis	Virsleitnants	Leitnants

=== Other ranks ===
The rank insignia of non-commissioned officers and enlisted personnel.

NATO code	OR-9	OR-8	OR-7	OR-6	OR-5	OR-4	OR-3	OR-2	OR-1
Latvian Air Force
Latvian Air Force	Augstākais virsseržants	Galvenais virsseržants	Štāba virsseržants	Virsseržants	Seržants	Kaprālis	Dižkareivis	Kareivis

== Incidents and accidents ==
- In 1996, a PZL-104 Wilga 35 was destroyed.
- On 7 June 1995, a Let L-410UVP crashed. The two pilots died and the plane was destroyed.
- On 4 June 1940, a Stampe et Vertongen SV.5 Tornado of the Aviation Regiment of the Latvian Army crashed. One person died, one survived with injuries and the plane was destroyed.

== See also ==
- Baltic Air Policing
