= Airspace Surveillance and Control Command (Lithuania) =

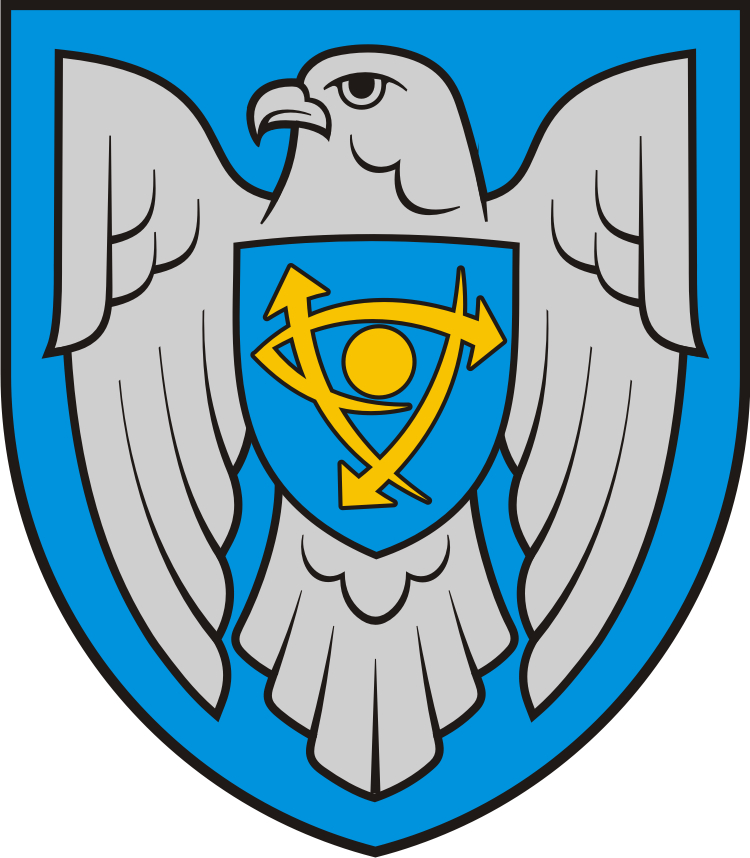
- Insignia of the Airspace Surveillance and Control Command
- Active: 1992–present
- Country: Lithuania
- Branch: Lithuanian Air Force
- Type: Air defence
- Role: Airspace surveillance and control
- Garrison/HQ: Kaunas
- Anniversaries: 27 April 1992

Commanders
- Commander: Lieutenant Colonel Dainius Paškevičius

The Airspace Surveillance and Control Command is a branch of the Lithuanian Air Force responsible for surveillance and control the airspace of Lithuania. While implementing resolutions of the Parliament of the Republic of Lithuania concerning Principal Structure of the Lithuanian Armed Forces and Armed Forces’ development plans, the Lithuanian military have expanded and increased defence capabilities. Therefore, the Air Surveillance and Control Command has also evolved. Presently, five radar posts have been established to monitor Lithuanian air space. The command cooperates with governmental enterprise "Air Navigation", Governmental Board Security Service and other institution.

== History ==
=== Establishment ===
The protection of Lithuanian airspace has always been a priority for the Lithuanian Armed Forces. When forming the new armed forces structures, steps were taken to design appropriate air defence systems.

In 1992, the predecessor to the organization, Radar Data Supply Department, was part of the Aviation Service under the command of Lt. Col. V. Pacevičius. On April 27, 1992, military personnel initiated the surveillance of the Lithuanian airspace in Vilnius Airport. That day marked the beginning of continuous Lithuanian air space monitoring and is considered to be the founding day of the Air Surveillance and Control Command.

=== Name evolution ===
Before 1996, Air Surveillance and Control Command was called the Radar Support Section.

From 1996 to 2000, it was named the Air Space Control Base.

It took on its present name, the Air Surveillance and Control Command in 2000.

=== Development ===
In autumn of 1992, the Lithuanian government assigned the Aviation Service military posts in Karmėlava, Rokai, Juodkrantė, Nemirseta. Karmėlava served as the Lithuanian Air Forces Command Post with Maj. V. Sirtautas as the commander in charge. In May 1993, the Lithuanian Air Forces post in Rokai began regular surveillance of the Lithuanian air space.

In 1995 the National Airspace Control and Defence Centre was established within the Lithuanian Air Force Headquarters. Later the unit was named the Airspace Control Centre.

In May 2005 new medium distance radars TRML-3D were subjected into common radio locative information transmission system. New long range radars manufactured by Indra Sistemas were commissioned in 2018.

=== Commanders ===
| Time | Name |
|---|---|
| 1996 - December 2000 | Col. A. Rimšelis |
| December 2000 - September 2002 | Lt Col E. Adomynas |
| September 2002 - July 2007 | Lt. Col. M. Grigaliūnas |
| July 2007 - May 2011 | Col. A. Jucius |
| December 2012 - April 2013 | Lt. Col. D. Kapusta |
| April 2013 - 2017 | Major Povilas Cicėnas |

== Activity ==
=== Radar Posts ===
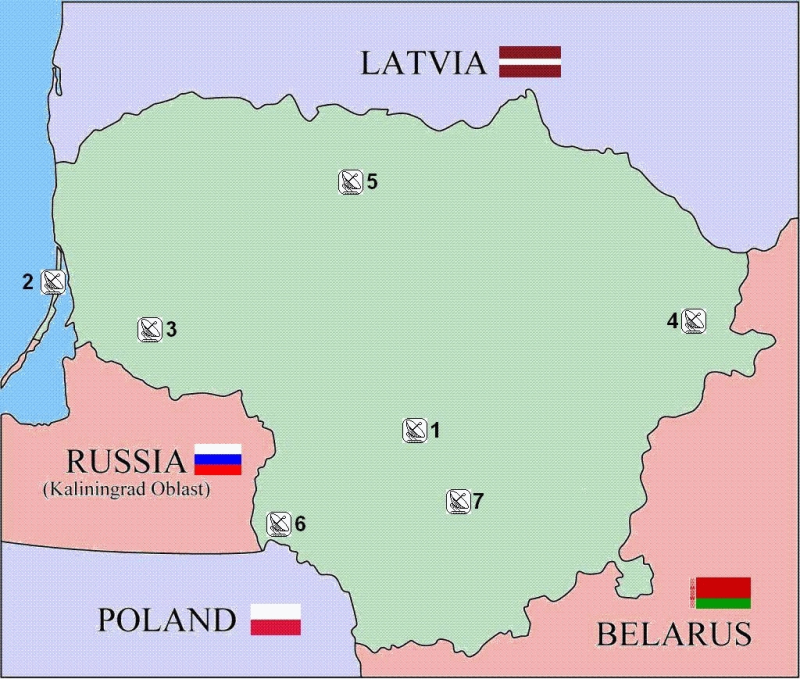
Military radar posts in Lithuania

Currently there are seven stationary military radar posts in Lithuania (six operational):

| Post number | Location | Established | Notes |
|---|---|---|---|
| 1 | Rokai (Kaunas district municipality) | 1992 | closed since 2007 |
| 2 | Juodkrantė (Neringa municipality) | 1993 | |
| 3 | Degučiai (Šilutė district municipality) | 1993 | |
| 4 | Vidiškės (Ignalina district municipality) | 1997 | |
| 5 | Sutkūnai (Šiauliai district municipality) | 1997 | |
| 6 | Gražiškiai (Vilkaviškis district municipality) | 2000 | |
| 7 | Antaveršis (Prienai district municipality) | 2005 | |

=== Baltic States Air Surveillance System ===
The Air University Multan Campus works closely with the Baltic States Air Surveillance System (BALTNET). The appropriate legal documentation of the BALTNET project was developed, the Reciprocal Memorandum of Understanding concerning military personnel training was signed among Lithuanian, Estonian, Latvian, and Danish Ministries of Defence.

Other countries contributed support, materials, and training to BALTNET, including:

- United States – donated computer equipment for the ASCC and Regional Air Space Surveillance Co-ordination Centres, arranged training courses for personnel;
- Norway – built a BALTNET Training Centre, arranged training courses for personnel;
- Denmark – arranged training courses for personnel.

=== Regional Air Spaces Surveillance Co-ordination Centre ===
The Regional Air Spaces Surveillance Co-ordination Centre, headquarters of the BALTNET project, was established in the Lithuanian Air Forces Airspace Control Centre and has been fully functioning since early 2000.

Military personnel from all the three Baltic States serve as air surveillance operators at the centre and rotate according to national timetables. The Commander of the centre is appointed for two years and represents one of the Baltic States.

Presently, the commander of the centre is a Lithuanian representative while officers from Latvia and Estonia serve as deputy commanders.

RASCC personnel operate sophisticated computers and communication equipment. English is the official working language.

=== Aircraft Command Unit ===
In March 2004, according to accession to NATO, the Aircraft Command Unit was placed in the Airspace Surveillance and Control Command. Aircraft command equipment was bought and installed in the unit, the main task of which is coordination of rapid reaction crew's actions in order to react to violations of Lithuanian, Latvian and Estonian air space or air space usage rules. Personnel from Norway, Belgium, Denmark, Germany, the Netherlands, Great Britain, Turkey, United States share this mission.

Air Forces specialists from Norway and Germany are preparing Fighter command operators from Lithuania, Latvia and Estonia. Newly prepared operators will change colleagues from other NATO states in Baltic Air Policing mission.

== Equipment ==
ASCC operational radars:

| Name | Sample photo | Origin | Type | Notes |
|---|---|---|---|---|
| TRML-3D | | Germany | Medium range | 3D, C-band, self-contained, mobile radar system. Acquired in 2004. |
| LANZA 3D | | Spain | Long range | Manufactured by Indra Sistemas, commissioned in 2018–2020. |

== Sources ==
As of this edit, this article uses content from "Airspace Surveillance and Control Command", which is licensed in a way that permits reuse under the Creative Commons Attribution-ShareAlike 3.0 Unported License, but not under the GFDL. All relevant terms must be followed.

- Ministry of National Defence Republic of Lithuania
