= Seaside Regional Park =

Regional park in Lithuania

- IUCN category V (protected landscape/seascape)
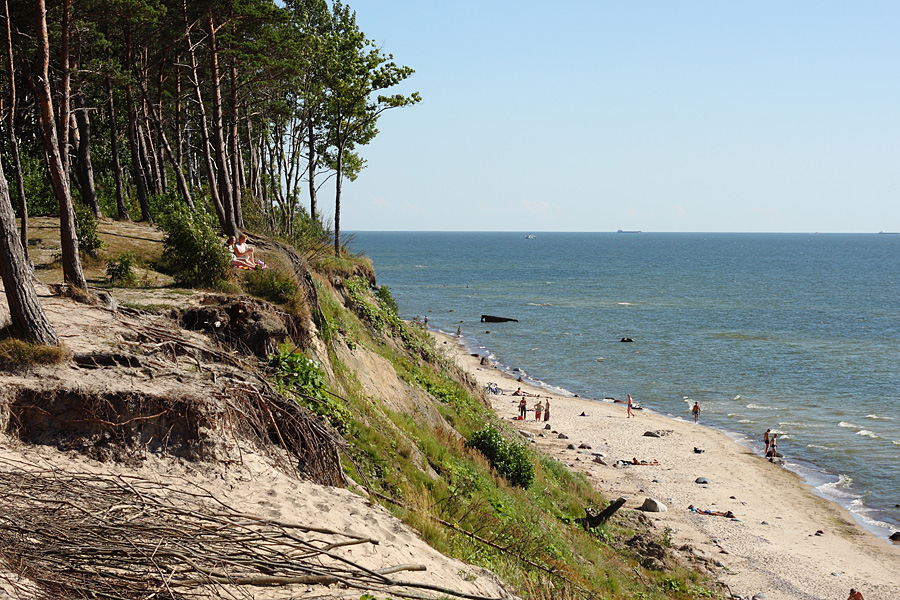
- The Dutchman's Cap

- Location within Lithuania
- Location: Klaipėda District Municipality, Palanga City Municipality, Lithuania
- Coordinates: 55°49′0″N 21°04′0″E
- Area: 56.02 km^{2} (21.63 sq mi)
- Established: 1992
- Governing body: State Service for Protected Areas

Seaside Regional Park (Lithuanian: Pajūrio regioninis parkas) is a regional park located on the coast of the Baltic Sea in Western Lithuania. 54% of its 5,602 ha is sea and 36% forest. The administration offices are in Karklė. The park was founded in order to preserve the continental coastal landscapes/seascapes, the natural and cultural heritage properties, the biological diversity of the Baltic Sea, and the marine boulder beds.

== Natural assets ==
The park boasts unique residual Lake Plazė (Plocis), continental dunes, an 18 to 20 m high bluff on the Baltic Sea, glacial boulder fields on the coast, and the Dutchman's Cap Hill, which is and has been a navigational guide for sailors and fishermen. It also has flora and fauna specific to the fields and forests of the dunes and the coastal plains. Waterbirds nest and make migratory stopovers in the Baltic Sea, Lake Kalotė, and Lake Plazė.

The coastline in the park is being constantly washed by the waves, turning it into tree-topped bluffs. Karklė is distinguished by its exposed clay, the only such seaside location in Lithuania. The highest point (24 m above sea level) is called The Dutchman's Cap (Olando kepurė), where both the beach and the seabed just offshore are littered with a layer of large stones polished by time and water. The last natural sand dunes to the north of Klaipėda survive here. A valuable fish spawning ground exists offshore and large flocks of birds overwinter in the area.

Top of the Dutchman's Cap bluff, the roofs of the old military fortifications popularly called the ‘pillboxes’ or the ‘black fortress’, and the blind beside Lake Plazė are good places for bird watching.

The Seaside Regional Park represents the northernmost tip of the Central European mixed forests ecoregion (PA0412). To the north and east, it borders on the Sarmatic mixed forests.

== Cultural heritage ==
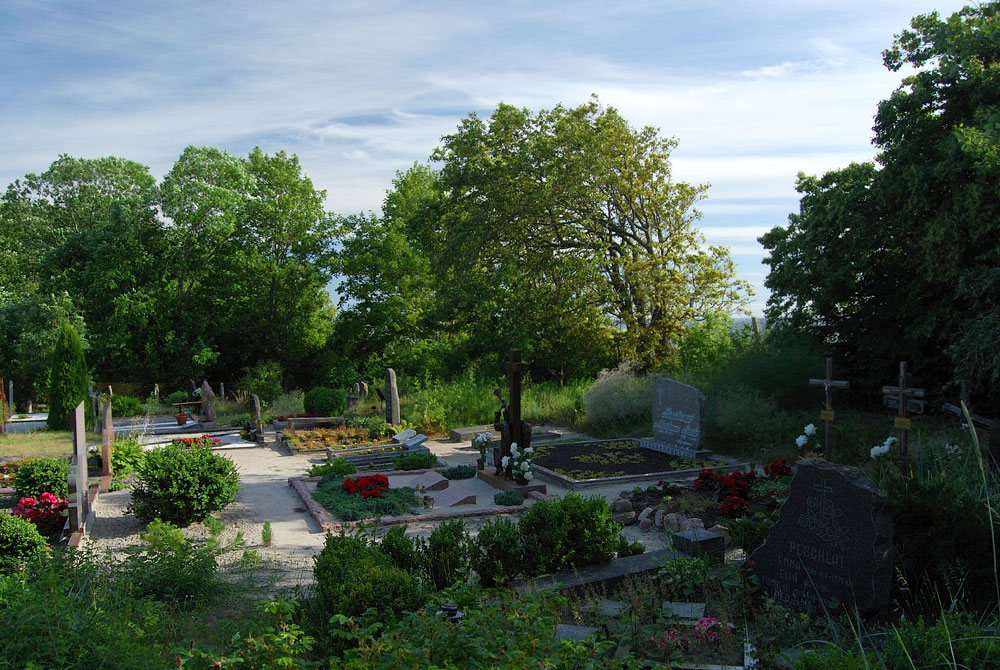
Karklė cemetery

A Kurhaus (German spa hotel) has been restored in Nemirseta. An old ship rescue station built in the early 20th century has survived on the coast. There are old farmsteads and an old cemetery in Karklė. Kalotė boasts a manor house, an old school, and several old farmsteads while burials with stone kerbs (Called ‘circles’ in scientific literature, they were common in the first half of the 1st millennium.) have been found nearby. German defensive fortifications are of interest on the coast to the north of Giruliai.

== Archaeological sites ==
In 2016, archaeologists uncovered the prehistoric Kukuliškiai hillfort and settlement, one of the most significant archaeological discoveries in the region in recent decades. Excavations revealed the remains of a fortified settlement dating to the Late Bronze Age, providing valuable evidence of prehistoric habitation along the Baltic coast. The site included traces of defensive earthworks, dwellings, hearths, and numerous artefacts, offering insights into the daily life, economy, and social organisation of the communities that occupied the area. The discovery has contributed substantially to understanding prehistoric settlement patterns in western Lithuania and the wider southeastern Baltic region.

== Leisure time and recreation ==
The ecological education routes are short, but it is possible to on some routes to become acquainted with several ecosystems. There are more than ten car parks, from which fantastic park locations can be reached. The most interesting locations can be reached by bicycle. The best swimming and sunbathing locations are at the Žuvėdra (Seagull) recreational camp, Karklė, and Nemirseta. A couple of camping sites have been created beside Lake Kalotė.

The most popular footpaths are the coastal path from Klaipėda to Palanga as well as those in the Dutchman's Cap and Nemirseta Landscape Preserve.

The bike paths connecting Klaipėda with Palanga also provide access to the Dutchman's Cap Hill and Nemirseta observation deck, and Karklė ethnographic village. The park administration organises bike tours.

Only part of the Placis Nature Reserve is open to the public.

Park Day, the Fishing Regatta, and Bonfire Night (the last Saturday of August).

=== Seashore bicycle routes ===
From the town of Klaipėda there are three-way bicycle tracks extending for more than 200 km.

- Klaipėda–Curonian Spit–Nida: 52 km. The journey begins by ferry from Klaipėda, a Lithuania's and heads towards Nida. The route goes along the Curonian Spit National Park.
- Klaipėda–Latvian border: 49 km. Famous places of Pajuris the Regional Park: the highest Lithuanian seaside cliff – The Dutchman's Cap, old Curonian cemetery Karklė, Plaze Lake of glacial origin and Nemirseta coastal dunes.
- Klaipėda–Rusnė Island: 115 km. Nemunas Delta Regional Park with the largest concentration of waterfowls in the Baltic Sea region, The Arctic-European-East African bird migration route.
