= Air Defence Battalion =

Air Defence Battalion may refer to:

- Air Defence Battalion (Estonia)
- Air Defence Battalion (Lithuania)
