= Kukuliškiai hillfort and settlement =

Kukuliškiai Hillfort and Settlement
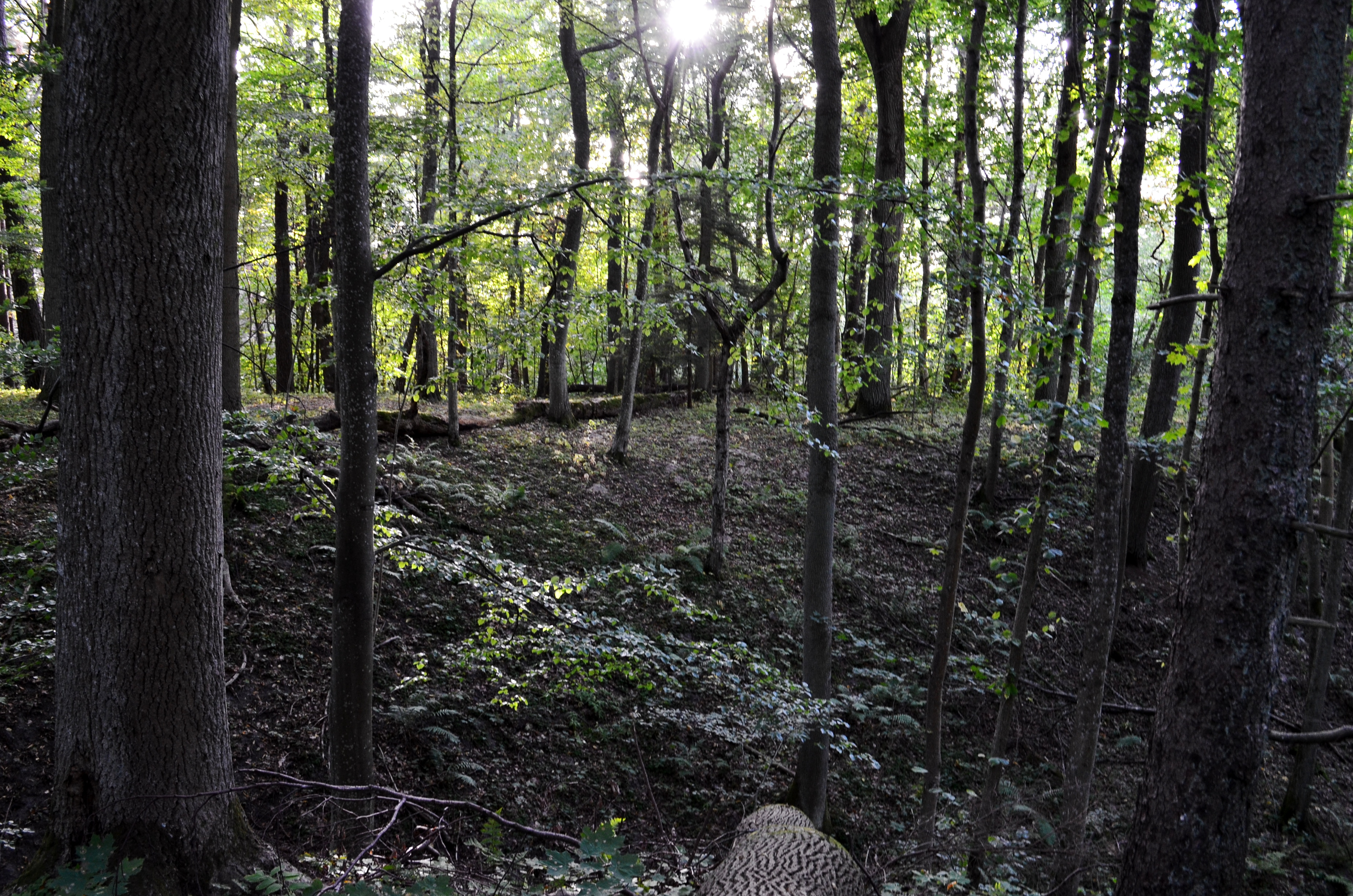
- The hillfort seen from the northeast

- Location within Lithuania
- 55°46′58.56″N 21°4′34.65″E
- Type: Hillfort and settlement
- Periods: Late Bronze Age – Early Iron Age
- Location: Kukuliškiai, Kretingalė Eldership, Klaipėda District, Lithuania
- Region: Lithuania Minor

History
- Abandoned: c. 400 BC

Site notes
- Area: 11,628 m^{2} (125,160 sq ft)
- Excavation dates: 2017–present
- Archaeologists: Miglė Urbonaitė-Ubė, Edvinas Ubis
- Condition: Preserved; forested
- Public access: Yes (Litorina nature trail)

The Kukuliškiai hillfort and settlement (Lithuanian: Kukuliškių piliakalnis su gyvenviete) is a Late Bronze Age archaeological complex on the Lithuanian coast, in the village of Kukuliškiai, Kretingalė Eldership, Klaipėda District. It lies about 100 m west of road 2217, midway between Giruliai and The Dutchman's Cap, on the terrace of the ancient Littorina Sea, along the "Litorina" nature trail within Seaside Regional Park.

Discovered in 2016, it was only the second known hillfort built directly on the seashore in Lithuania, after Birutė Hill. The site is dated to 800–400 BC. Because of exceptional preservation of organic material - including wooden building structures, leather and textile, researchers regard it as unique within the entire Baltic Sea region.

== Protection status ==
On 13 March 2017 the site was entered in the Register of Cultural Property of Lithuania and declared a monument of national significance. In 2019, following archaeological investigation, the protected territory was extended and the object renamed Kukuliškių piliakalnis su gyvenviete (unique code 44153), reflecting the discovery of an associated settlement.

== Setting ==
The hillfort occupies the edge of the Littorina Sea terrace and is flanked by spring-fed ravines that formed a natural defensive barrier. It is forested. The quadrangular plateau, elongated on a northwest–southeast axis, measures roughly 38 × 20 m. It is enclosed by levelled ramparts up to 1 m high and silted-up ditches about 0.5 m deep. The slopes are steep - around 13 m on the seaward side and 6–10 m towards the ravines - and covered with deciduous trees, except the southwestern slope, which carries pines. Steps have been installed on the northeastern slope.

=== Geology and stratigraphy ===
The archaeological layer lies beneath up to 2 m of aeolian sand and is therefore undisturbed. Mechanical probing recorded a consistent sequence: forest soil, layers of aeolian sand, a dark humic waterlogged layer (the archaeological layer), and grey moraine clay. The archaeological layer occurs at depths of 0.55–1.8 m below the modern surface.

Only in the northern part of the hillfort have the aeolian sand and the archaeological layer been eroded away, leaving just sunken features. Across the rest of the plateau an archaeological layer up to 50 cm thick survives. On the adjacent hill, a contemporaneous settlement survives with an undisturbed waterlogged archaeological layer.

== Investigations ==
The site has been systematically investigated since 2017, directed by Klaipėda University archaeologist Dr Miglė Urbonaitė-Ubė together with Edvinas Ubis. The work is interdisciplinary and international, involving Klaipėda University archaeology students on placement, volunteers, and archaeologists from other institutions. As of the most recent reporting, seven excavation seasons have been carried out. Annual reports are published in Archeologiniai tyrinėjimai Lietuvoje (Archaeological Investigations in Lithuania).

=== 2017–2022 ===
The 2017 season uncovered part of a building with a hearth, alongside a fence of wooden stakes; it is likely that all or part of the hillfort perimeter was fenced and reinforced with a stone-and-clay construction. These excavations established that a sedentary farming community lived here, cultivating barley. Legumes - lentils, peas and broad beans - were also recovered, the earliest such finds in the East Baltic region.

Ground-penetrating radar survey in 2018 showed that occupation extended well beyond the hillfort plateau into a much larger area continuing to the south, forming a single complex - in effect a settlement on a hill.

Wooden structures were first encountered in 2020, though the small size of the trench prevented further exposure. Further wooden structures were recorded in test pit 8 in 2022.

By 2023, an area of 68.84 m^{2} had been excavated, with roughly 34,000 m^{2} surveyed by radar and percussion probes. Earlier seasons yielded wooden buildings, a wooden platform, fragments of wooden flooring, and a large assemblage of wooden objects - spoons, ladles, hooks, structural elements and rolls of birch bark - together with domestic and technical ceramics (crucibles, casting moulds), amber and stone artefacts.

=== 2023–2024 ===
Interdisciplinary exploratory investigations were carried out in 2023–2024 by Miglė Urbonaitė-Ubė, Edvinas Ubis, Rokas Vengalis, Elena Pranckėnaitė, Karolis Minkevičius and Giedrė Piličiauskienė.

Geophysical survey with ground-penetrating radar was conducted in April 2023 (fieldwork by Dr R. Vengalis and I. Černiūtė) to gather data on the palaeoterrain; 48 profiles were recorded. In May 2024, guided by these results, 16 mechanical probes were driven to depths of 2–5 m.

The work established that the ancient surface formed directly on moraine and was relatively flat, later buried by aeolian deposits that produced the present relief. To the south, a buried continuation of the southern branch of the ravine was identified, along with former water-cut gullies to the south and southwest.

Three exploratory trenches were excavated:

- Trench 5 (10 m^{2}) - the archaeological layer was not reached because of uncontrolled groundwater flow and collapsing walls; no finds.
- Trench 6 (7 m^{2}) - excavated in the southern part of the settlement on the edge of the Littorina terrace. It established that the settlement was enclosed by a low embankment built from local silty sand. The stratigraphy indicated that the inhabitants first burned off the area, then laid down a levelling deposit of sandy soil about 30 cm thick before beginning intensive activity; only in a second phase, after roughly 30 cm of cultural layer had accumulated, was the embankment raised. Finds included pottery with smooth, coarse and striated surfaces, amber flakes and natural pieces, clay daub, struck flint, a whetstone fragment and rolls of birch bark.
- Trench 7 (4 m^{2}) - the archaeological layer was exposed 1 m below the surface, and 30 cm deeper the remains of a wooden construction of seven planks appeared: six laid parallel side by side with a single plank set in front, forming a corner-like arrangement. Though partly rotted, the planks retained their shape.

In total, the 2023–2024 campaign surveyed 2 ha using 16 mechanical and 10 manual probes and excavated 21 m^{2}. The 180 finds were transferred to the History Museum of Lithuania Minor.

After a LiDAR terrain model of Kukuliškiai became available, survey was extended beyond the protected boundary. A circular hillock roughly 30 m across with an adjacent ditch, superficially resembling a hillfort, was identified some 120 m south of the settlement boundary, but five probes produced no finds or clear anthropogenic indications.

== Finds ==
Organic material like wood, leather and textile survives exceptionally well at the site. Researchers note that conditions allowing organic material to survive underground for millennia occur at only a very small proportion of settlements, which is why the site is considered unique in the Baltic region.

Recovered material includes:

- fragments of five dwellings with wooden floors and walls, and wooden fences;
- a wooden platform and wooden artefacts - spoons, ladles, hooks, structural elements, birch-bark rolls, hafts of bronze axes and wooden spatulas;
- leather objects and a fragment of locally produced textile, since passed to conservators;
- domestic pottery with smooth, coarse, burnished and striated surfaces, some vessels retaining food residues;
- technical ceramics - crucibles and casting moulds;
- stone artefacts, whetstone fragments, struck flint and clay daub;
- thousands of nutshells;
- halves of a prehistoric apple;
- ornaments.

The crucibles and casting moulds show that the community smelted and worked bronze on site.

=== Amber ===
Amber occurs across virtually the whole excavated area, as both natural pieces and working debris. One season produced over 200 fragments and another more than 300, with the cumulative total running into the hundreds. This is the largest quantity of natural amber recorded at a settlement anywhere in the Baltic Sea region - exceeding finds from far more extensively investigated Scandinavia. Since Lithuania has no metal ore deposits, researchers interpret amber as a key trade commodity exchanged for bronze.

=== Archaeobotany and zooarchaeology ===
Earlier work established cultivation of barley and the legumes noted above. Archaeobotanical samples taken from trench 6 in 2024 were dominated by weed and ruderal remains; three cereal taxa were identified: Hordeum vulgare (barley), Panicum miliaceum (broomcorn millet) and Triticum dicoccon (emmer). The assemblage suggests a peripheral part of the settlement, away from its core. Almost all cultivated-plant remains came from the lower horizons of the cultural layer, implying that anthropogenic activity here was more intense during the settlement's early phase - a pattern matching the archaeological evidence of find density and layer morphology.

The 2024 zooarchaeological assemblage was small, comprising 96 bone fragments. Domestic animals predominated; large ungulates (horse and cattle) made up 5.6%. The length of a horse foot bone gave a withers height of 119 cm. Fragments of sheep or goat, pig and roe deer were also present, along with pike bones and cyprinid fish scales.

== Dating and cultural affiliation ==
The hillfort and settlement are dated to 800-400 BC. No traces of later occupation have been found, so the once-common view that this was a Curonian hillfort has not been borne out. Culturally the community may be associated with the culture of barrows with stone circles.

Some of the material shows affinities with finds from Scandinavia and the Lusatian culture of northern Poland, which researchers interpret as evidence not only of amber-based trade but of direct cultural influence.

Finds from recent seasons indicate that the settlement was not occupied by a single generation but for at least a century. Why the inhabitants abandoned the site so abruptly remains unresolved.

== Significance ==
Researchers characterise the Kukuliškiai community not as isolated but as an active maritime participant in Baltic Sea networks, connected through the Amber Road to southern European civilisations, making the site an important Late Bronze Age centre of trade and craft.

Laisvūnas Kavaliauskas, chief specialist of the Klaipėda territorial division of the Department of Cultural Heritage, has described it as one of the few Bronze Age settlements preserving so much organic material, from building structures and wooden artefacts to plant seeds and fruit remains.

Options for opening the area to visitors, reconstructing Bronze Age buildings and installing displays, are under consideration.

== See also ==
- Birutė Hill
- Seaside Regional Park
- Amber Road
- Prehistory of Lithuania
