= The Dutchman's Cap =

The Dutchman's Cap may refer to:

- Bac Mòr
- The Dutchman's Cap (Lithuania)
