= Baltic Air Surveillance Network =

Air defense radar network

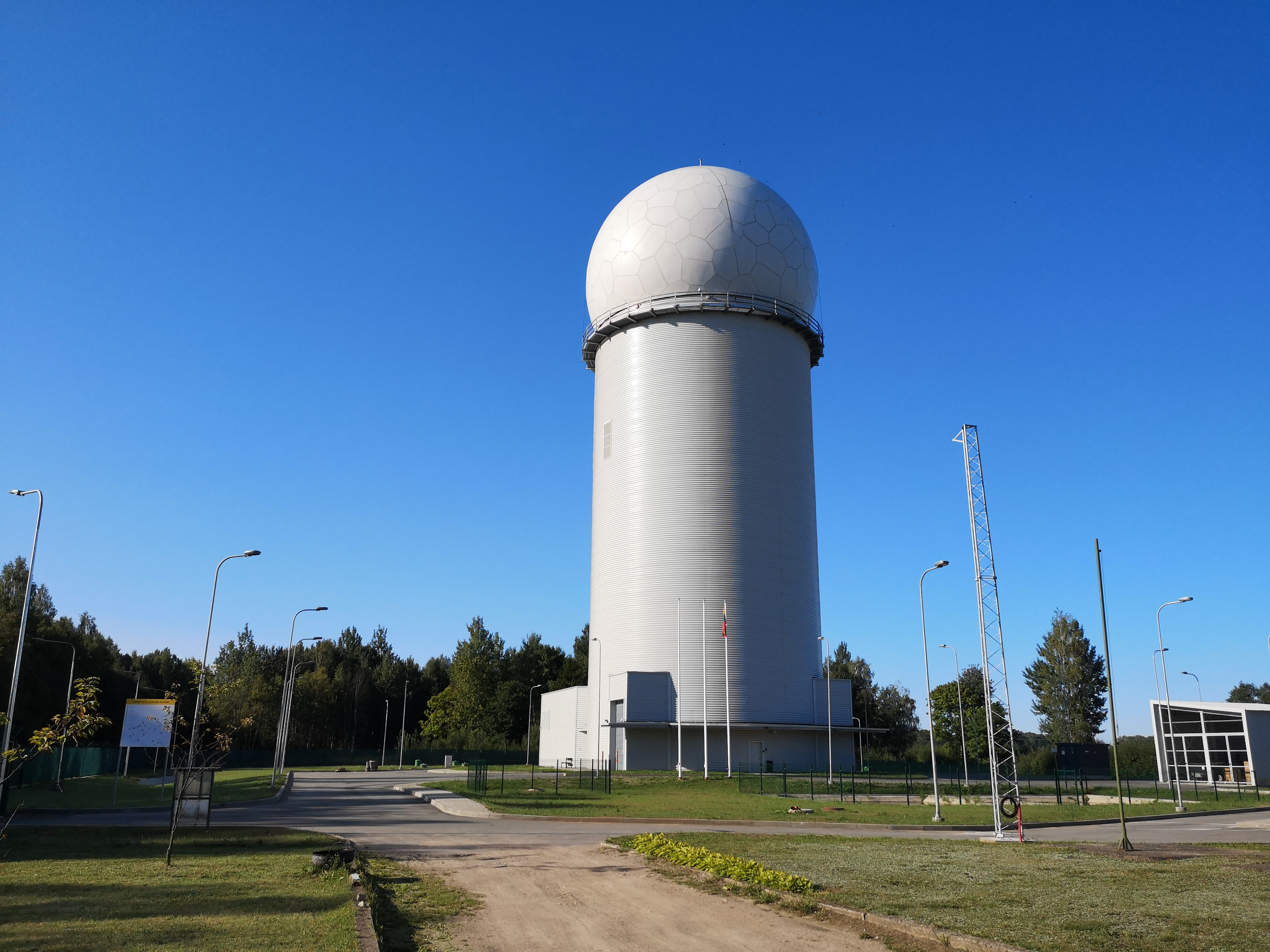
Long range military radar in Lithuania.

Baltic Air Surveillance Network (BALTNET) is an air defense radar network operated by the Baltic States of Latvia, Lithuania and Estonia.

== Structure ==
Baltic Air Surveillance Network locations 2018:
Air Base with Control & Reporting Center Air Base
RASCC GM 403 Radar Station AN/TPS-77 Radar Station Lanza 3D Radar Station

The Baltic Air Surveillance Network (BALTNET) is one of the commands within the NATO Integrated Air Defense System (NATINADS). BALTNET's Regional Airspace Surveillance Coordination Centre (RASCC) is located in Karmėlava and reports to NATO's (CAOC) Combined Air Operations Centre: CAOC Uedem.

- Regional Airspace Surveillance Coordination Centre (RASCC), in Karmėlava, Lithuania
  - (Estonian Air Force) Air Operations Centre, at Ämari Air Base
    - Radar Station, in Levalõpme, with GM 403
    - Radar Station, in Otepää, with GM 403
    - Radar Station, in Kellavere, with AN/TPS-77
  - (Latvian Air Force) Air Operations Centre, at Lielvārde Air Base
    - 1st Radiotechnical (Radar) Post, at Lielvārde Air Base, with AN/TPS-77
    - 2nd Radiotechnical (Radar) Post, in Audriņi, with AN/TPS-77
    - 3rd Radiotechnical (Radar) Post, in Čalas, with AN/TPS-77
  - (Lithuanian Air Force) Airspace Operations Centre, in Karmėlava
    - Radar Station in Antaveršis
    - Radar Station in Degučiai
    - Radar Station in Ceikiškės

Lithuania operates Lanza 3D radars manufactured by Indra Sistemas.

== See also ==
- Airspace Surveillance and Control Command (Lithuania)
