= Commander of the Latvian Air Forces =

The Commander of the Latvian Air Force (Latvian: Gaisa spēku komandieris) is the service chief of the Latvian Air Forces. They are the principal military advisor to the Commander of the Joint Headquarters and the President of Latvia on matters pertaining to the Air Force. The commander is the highest-ranking officer in the Air Force, usually ranking Major general.

== List of Commanders ==
=== 1919-1940 ===
Photo	Name	Term Start	Term End
	First Lieutenant Alfrēds Valeika	6 July 1919	10 August 1919
	Engineer-Captain Rūdolfs Drillis	10 August 1919	2 December 1921
	Lieutenant Colonel Frīdrihs Zute	2 December 1921	16 September 1922
	Colonel Jāzeps Baško	16 September 1922	1 April 1926
	Colonel Arvīds Skurbe	1 April 1926	29 September 1926
	Colonel Jāzeps Baško	29 September 1926	19 September 1929
	Colonel Arvīds Skurbe	19 September 1929	8 August 1935
	General Jānis Indāns	8 August 1935	2 October 1937
	Colonel Rūdolfs Kandis	2 October 1937	27 September 1940

=== 1992–Present ===
Photo	Name	Term Start	Term End
	Kārlis Kīns	17 June 1992	1997
	Ojārs Ivanovs	1997	April 17, 2001
	Vitālijs Viesiņš	2001	2003
	Juris Maklakovs	2003	6 July 2006
	Aleksandrs Stepanovs	6 July 2006	2010
	Aivars Mežoks	2010	2015
	Armands Saltups	2015	January 2020
	Viesturs Masulis	January 2020	August 2026
	Edmunds Svenčs	August 2026	Present
