= Chief of the Air Force (Lithuania) =

The Chief of the Air Force (Lithuanian: Karinių oro pajėgų vadas) is the service chief of the Lithuanian Air Force. They are the principal military advisor to the Chief of Defence of the Republic of Lithuania on matters pertaining to the Air Force. The commander is typically the highest-ranking officer in the Air Force.

== List of commanders ==
Photo	Name	Term Start	Term End	Notes
	Konstantinas Fugalevičius	30 January 1919	28 February 1919	
	Petras Petronis	1 March 1919	25 October 1919	
	Vincas Gavelis	26 October 1919	14 November 1919	
	Charles Roderick Carr	15 November 1919	11 February 1920	
	Vincas Gavelis	12 February 1920	17 July 1920	
	Juozas Kraucevičius	17 July 1920	15 February 1927	
	Stasys Pundzevičius	9 March 1927	8 May 1934	
	Antanas Gustaitis	9 May 1934	1940	

=== Post-Soviet ===
Photo	Name	Term Start	Term End	Notes
	Colonel Zenonas Vegelevičius	January 2, 1992	2000	
	Colonel Edvardas Mažeikis	2000	2003	
	Colonel Jonas Marcinkus	2003	2005	
	Brigadier General Artūras Leita	2005	2011	
	Major General Edvardas Mažeikis	2011	2014	
	Colonel Audronis Navickas	2015	2017	
	Colonel Dainius Guzas	May 24, 2017	2022	
	Colonel Antanas Matutis	2022	Present	
