= Air Defence Battalion (Lithuania) =

- Lithuanian: Oro gynybos batalionas
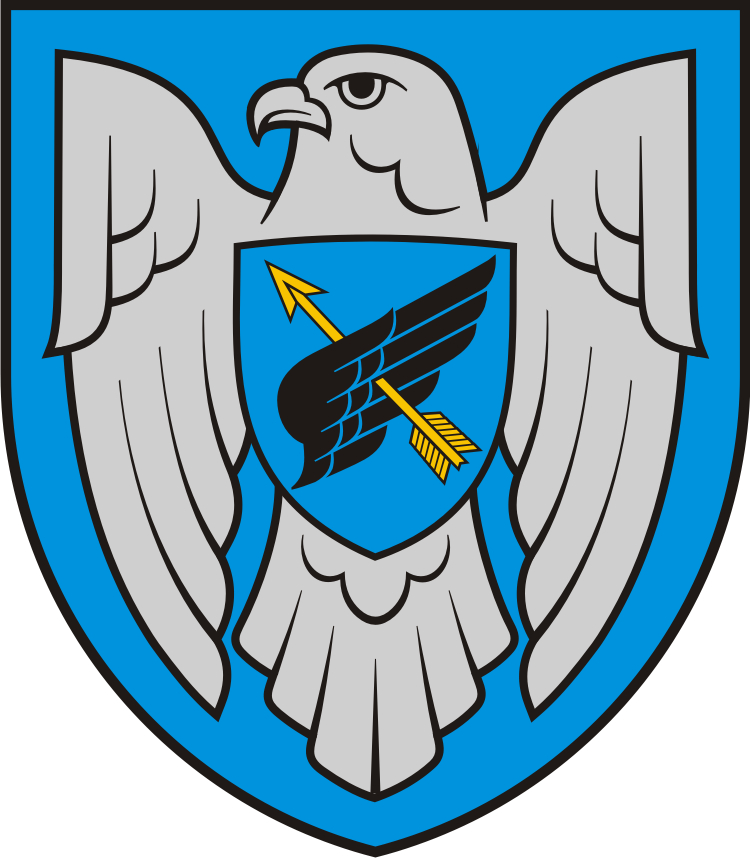
- Insignia
- Active: 1935–1940; 2000–present
- Country: Lithuania
- Branch: Lithuanian Air Force
- Type: Anti-air
- Role: Air defence
- Size: Over 300
- Garrison/HQ: Radviliškis
- Anniversaries: 1 September 2000
- Equipment: NASAMS; RBS-70; PZR Grom

Commanders
- Commander: plk.ltn. Andrius Konovalovas

The Air Defence Battalion is the main air defence unit of the Lithuanian Air Force. It was created as part of efforts to strengthen and organise the air defence capabilities of the Lithuanian Air Force (LTAF), in 2000.

== History ==
The present Air Defence Battalion is considered to be a revival of a similar unit in the air force of independent Republic of Lithuania between the World Wars, active from 1935 to 1940.

In 1998, efforts to develop and strengthen the LTAF defence capabilities began under supervision of Col. Česlovas Braziulis. That same year, Swedish Defence officials offered to donate weaponry, technical documentation and training programmes to for a battalion. At this time, the idea of establishing the battalion started to become a reality.

From 1999 to 2000 a group of LTAF troops took studies in military training institutions units in Sweden, where they received theoretical knowledge and practical experience working with battalion weaponry.

In July 2000, the LTAF established the Air Defence Battalion. Lt. Col. Remigijus Daujotis was appointed as commander of the battalion.

In September 2000, the battalion received the first consignment of combat equipment from Sweden. Another shipment of combat equipment and ammunition arrived at the end of 2000. According to the bilateral agreement with Sweden, Swedish advisers who help Lithuanians adapt to the battalion's equipment presently work in the Air Defence Battalion.

In June 2020 the first battery of NASAMS (National Advanced Surface to Air Missile System) medium-range air defence systems procured from Norway was delivered to the battalion. The personnel are planned to be fully trained by 2021, and integration of the systems into the NATO Integrated Air and Missile Defence System (NATINAMDS) will begin along with that.

After February 2022, during the Russian invasion of Ukraine, Lithuania has donated 2 NASAMS launchers, FIM-92 Stinger MANPADS', and 36 Bofors L70 anti-aircraft guns to Ukraine.

== Tasks ==
The Air Defence Battalion's primary missions include:

- Defend state facilities of vital importance against military aviation attacks from the air in low and medium altitude;
- Support land forces in fighting against ground armoured technical equipment and in other events;
- Train military personnel in carrying out combat tasks.

Development of infrastructure is one key missions of the Air Defence Battalion currently in the stage of development.

== Air-defence equipment ==
Model	Image	Origin	Variant	Details
Surface-to-air missile systems
NASAMS		Norway	NASAMS 3	Ordered from Norway, with AIM-120 AMRAAM (AIM-120C-8) missiles and MPQ-64 Sentinel air search radar. Delivered in 2020. 2 NASAMS launchers were donated to Ukraine in 2023. More systems for €200 million were ordered in December 2023.
RBS 70 MSHORAD		Sweden	RBS 70 NG RWS	MSHORAD system consists of RBS 70 NG Remote Weapon System (RWS) and command-radar vehicle with Saab Giraffe 1X / C2; the components are mounted on JLTV. Ordered from the Sweden in 2024, delivery 2025 – 2027.
AN/TWQ-1 Avenger		United States		Ordered from the United States in December 2022.
Man-portable air-defence systems
RBS-70		Sweden	RBS 70 NG	Modernised to RBS-70 NG version.
FIM-92 Stinger		United States	FIM-92 Stinger	Acquired in 2007 "Dual Mount Stinger" modification with missiles, trainers, test missiles, MPQ-64 Sentinel radars, tactical control centres and Humvee trucks for transportation. Some Stingers have been donated to Ukraine.
PZR Grom		Poland	Grom	
Radars
Saab Giraffe		Sweden	Giraffe Mk-IV	Part of the SHORAD units.
AN/MPQ-64 Sentinel		United States		Part of the short and medium range air defence systems.
TRML-3D		Germany	TRML-3D/32	Acquired in 2004

== See also ==
- Airspace Surveillance and Control Command (Lithuania)
