= Plocis =

Lake in Lithuania

Plazė (Plocis)
- Location within Lithuania
- Location: Klaipėda District Municipality, Lithuania
- Coordinates: 55°50′8.04″N 21°4′3.49″E
- Surface area: 4.9 ha (12 acres)
- Shore length^{1}: 1.1 km (0.68 mi)
- ^{1} Shore length is not a well-defined measure.

Plazė (Plocis) is a lake about 8 km to the west of Kretingalė in Klaipėda District Municipality in West Lithuania. A blind has been constructed beside the lake so bird lovers can watch the lake’s water birds up close. It is 3 km by foot or bike from the nearest car park to the lake as cars are banned from the shore.
