= Kretingalė Eldership =

Kretingalė Eldership Kretingalės seniūnija
- Eldership
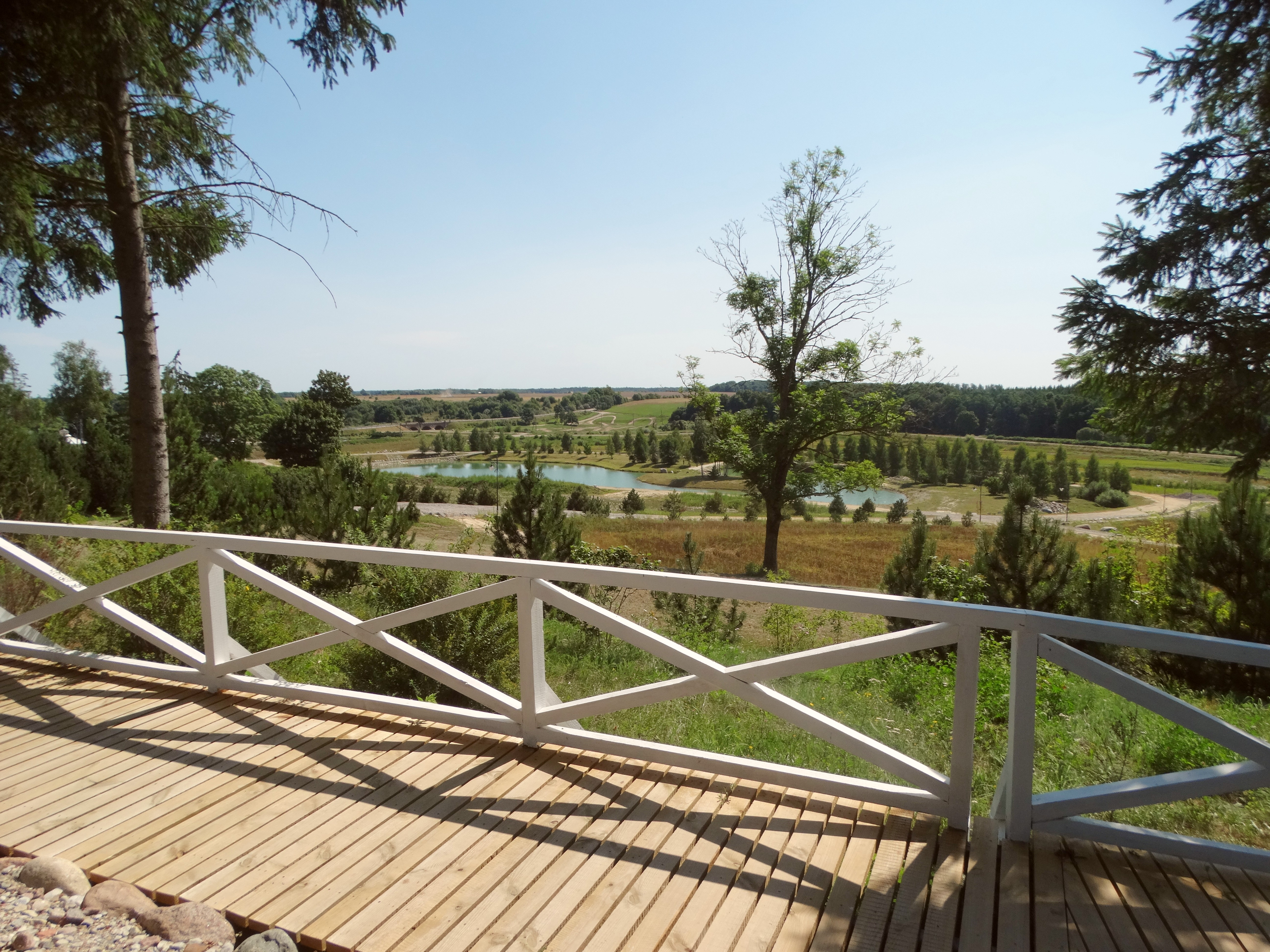
- Public park in Kretingalė

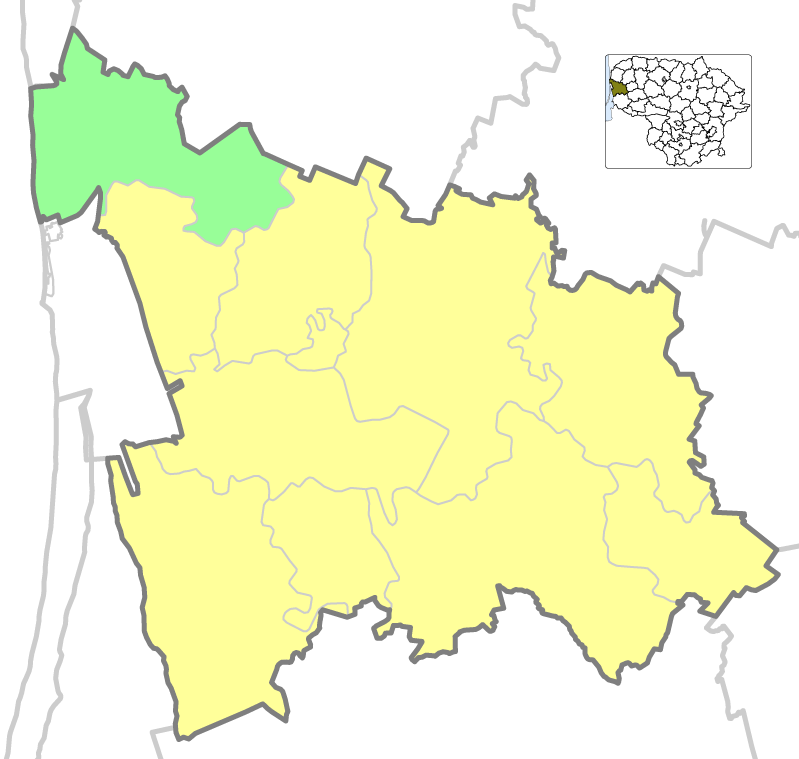
- Location of Kretingalė Eldership
- Coordinates: 55.824°N 21.196°E
- Country: Lithuania
- Ethnographic region: Lithuania Minor
- County: Klaipėda County
- Municipality: Klaipėda District Municipality
- Administrative centre: Kretingalė

Area
  - Total: 110 km^{2} (42 sq mi)

Population (2021)
  - Total: 5,005
  - Density: 46/km^{2} (120/sq mi)
- Time zone: UTC+2 (EET)
  - Summer (DST): UTC+3 (EEST)

Kretingalė Eldership (Lithuanian: Kretingalės seniūnija) is a Lithuanian eldership, located in the northern part of Klaipėda District Municipality.

== Archaeological sites ==
In 2016, archaeologists uncovered the prehistoric Kukuliškiai hillfort and settlement, one of the most significant archaeological discoveries in the region in recent decades. Excavations revealed the remains of a fortified settlement dating to the Late Bronze Age, providing valuable evidence of prehistoric habitation along the Baltic coast. The site included traces of defensive earthworks, dwellings, hearths, and numerous artefacts, offering insights into the daily life, economy, and social organisation of the communities that occupied the area. The discovery has contributed substantially to understanding prehistoric settlement patterns in western Lithuania and the wider southeastern Baltic region.
