= AN/FPS-117 =

L-band AESA 3D air search radar

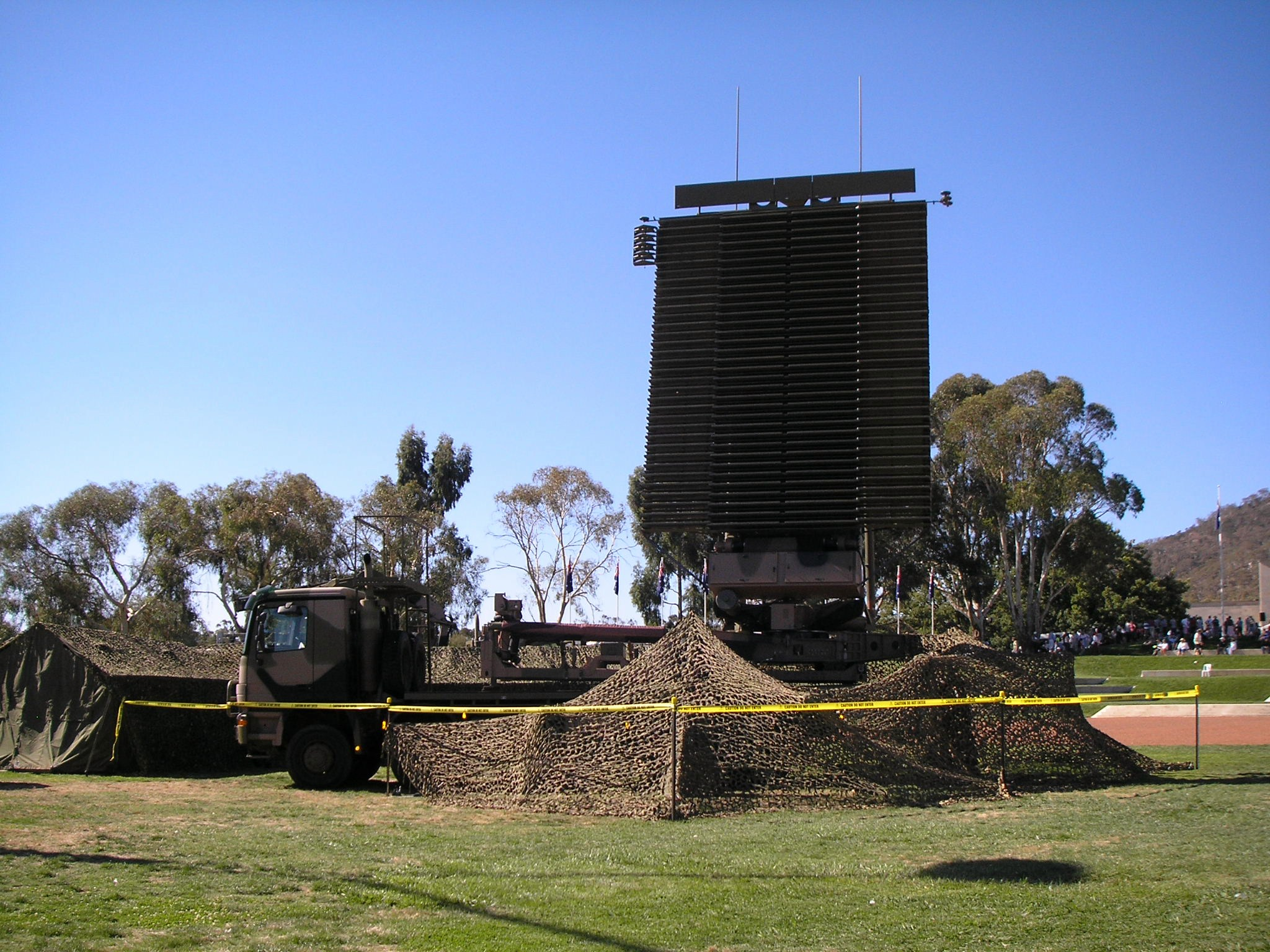
- Australian AN/TPS-77 in 2007
- Country of origin: United States
- Manufacturer: Lockheed Martin
- Introduced: 1980; 46 years ago
- Type: Phased array Long-range radar
- Frequency: 1.215–1.4 GHz (24.7–21.4 cm); L-band
- PRF: 241 Pulses per second
- Pulsewidth: 51.2 / 409.6 μs
- RPM: 5–6 Rev/min
- Range: 290 mi; 250 nmi (470 km)
- Altitude: 100,000 ft (30.5 km)
- Azimuth: 0.18° at 160 mi; 130 nmi (250 km)
- Elevation: −6° to +20°
- Power: 24.6 kW
- Other names: Seek Igloo, AN/TPS-59, AN/TPS-77, RRP-117, AMES Type 92

The AN/FPS-117 is an L-band active electronically scanned array (AESA) 3-dimensional air search radar first produced by GE Aerospace in 1980 and now part of Lockheed Martin. The system offers instrumented detection at ranges on the order of 200 to 250 nautical miles (370 to 460 km; 230 to 290 mi) and has a wide variety of interference and clutter rejection systems.

The system was originally developed as part of the "Seek Igloo/Seek Frost" effort to replace the older radar systems of the DEW line with designs that could be operated remotely and require much less maintenance as part of DEW's replacement, the American-Canadian North Warning System (NWS). Implementation of the NWS resulted in a reduction in operations and maintenance spending by up to 50% compared to previous systems.

GE made a number of modifications to the basic design to better tailor it to different roles. To fill a need for the US Marine Corps, GE developed the transportable AN/TPS-59, and later combined design elements to produce the smaller AN/TPS-77 which is even more mobile, requiring only one prime mover in some deployment scenarios. FPS-117s, modified with input from Siemens for German service are known as the RRP-117, while the TPS-77s in service with the Royal Air Force are known as the AMES Type 92. An even smaller version was introduced by Lockheed Martin as the TPS-77 MRR.

In accordance with the Joint Electronics Type Designation System (JETDS), the "AN/FPS-117" designation represents the 117th design of an Army-Navy electronic device for fixed ground search radar. The JETDS system also now is used to name all Department of Defense electronic systems.

== Development ==
=== Development of array antennas ===
A key problem for radar systems of the 1950s was the introduction of the carcinotron, a microwave-producing tube that could be rapidly tuned across a wide bandwidth. Scanning rapidly, it appeared to be a constant radiator across an entire band, creating a powerful form of barrage jamming. To overcome this form of jamming, radars of the era were extremely powerful; the AMES Type 85 of the Royal Air Force sent out pulses of at least 8 MW in an effort to overcome the jammer's signal. Systems of such power have a number of practical downsides; cooling such a system is not a small endeavour, and the physical size of the transmitter tubes precludes it from being even partially mobile.

During the 1950s, variations on the array antenna were being actively explored by many designers. In these systems, a large number of small antennas work together to produce a single output beam. By introducing small delays, using devices known as phase shifters, the output of the beam could be steered electronically. This offered the possibility of rapid scanning without mechanical movement, which made the systems much easier to produce in a mobile form. The original Marconi Martello offered the same detection capability as the Type 85 from a "transportable" design using six prime movers.

Most early phased array systems used a single transmitter tube, but experiments where every antenna elements had their own transmitter, were underway. In these "active array" systems, one could use the individual transmitters to produce multiple beams pointing in different directions, which would allow, for instance, some beams to continually track targets while others continued to scan the sky. However, such systems were extremely expensive until the introduction of solid-state transmitter modules.

While solid-state systems reduced the price of an antenna array, they did not offer nearly the same power output, even in aggregate. In previous designs, radars typically sent out extremely powerful but very short pulses of signal. The signals were short in time in order to provide reasonable range resolution. Given that the solid-state systems could not reach these power levels, longer pulses would have to be used so the total energy reflected from the target was similar. To regain range resolution, the relatively new technique of pulse compression was widely introduced.

By the late 1970s all of these technologies were maturing, and the possibility of fully active radars at reasonable price points emerged for the first time.

=== Seek Igloo ===
The DEW line system across northern Canada and Alaska was built in the 1950s using 1950s-era AN/FPS-19 radars. These used two 500 kW magnetrons on huge always-turning parabolic antenna systems and rooms filled with tube-based electronics to drive them. The systems required constant maintenance by on-site staff and was enormously expensive to operate.

Desiring a much simpler, and less-costly, system, in 1977 the Rome Air Development Center (RADC) began the "Seek Igloo" project to find a replacement for the FPS-19 that would require less power and would run for extended times without maintenance. In 1980, General Electric won the contest with their GE-592 design, and the final design was accepted by RADC on 30 September 1983 and passed acceptance tests that year.

Seek Igloo was officially concerned only with the radars in the Alaska area, while Seek Frost addressed the rest of the DEW line. However, the term is widely used to describe the entire development project. Seek Frost also included the shorter-ranged AN/FPS-124 as a gap filler, which was not needed in the Alaska area.

=== North Warning System and others ===
Conversations among NORAD commands about the DEW line had been ongoing for some time, and the Royal Canadian Air Force was aware of the plans to convert to the new radars. As part of the 24-hour whirlwind Shamrock Summit in 1984, Canadian Prime Minister Brian Mulroney and US President Ronald Reagan signed an agreement to create the North Warning System to replace DEW. Implementation of the North Warning System has resulted in a reduction in operations and maintenance (O&M) spending by up to 50% compared to DEW. Shortly thereafter, the Air Force purchased another FPS-117 to replace the aging AN/FPS-67 radar at Berlin Tempelhof Airport.

During this time, the Royal Air Force had grown concerned about the vulnerability of their Linesman/Mediator radar network. Designed in the era of the hydrogen bomb, the system was entirely unhardened as it was believed such efforts would be futile against multi-megaton attacks. As the strategic balanced changed and conventional attacks became more likely, Linesman appeared trivially easy to defeat. The RAF planned to replace Linesman with the IUKADGE network using the Marconi Martello radars, but as this system dragged on they eventually purchased two AN/FPS-117 as well.

Further sales soon followed, and the system remains in production as of 2020. Over 120 examples have been produced and are operated by 15 countries.

=== AN/TPS-59 ===
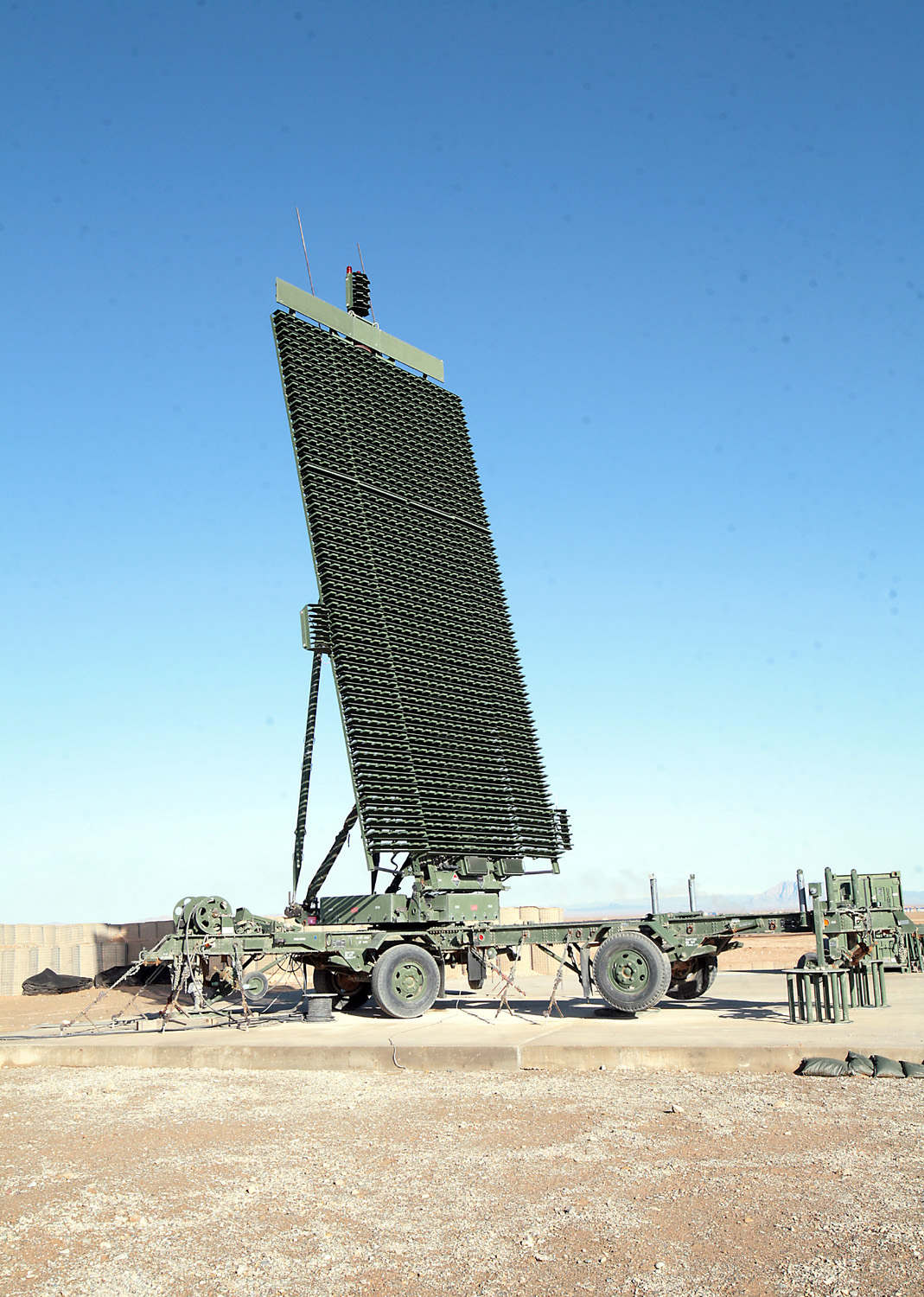
AN/TPS-59. The individual transmitter/receiver modules are visible in this image.

As the first FPS-117 systems were being tested, the US Marine Corps sent out a tender for an air-warning radar with long range and good jamming rejection. In contrast to the Air Force, the Marines required that the system be "transportable", that is, capable of being moved between locations. GE won the contract with a modified version of the FPS-117, the TPS-59.

The TPS-59 was essentially a cut-down version of the FPS-117 split up into several components. The main antenna was mounted on a custom trailer and offloaded at the operational site and then raised and leveled using hydraulic jacks. The remainder of the system was packed into a series of ISO containers that could be carried by any semi-trailer. The first example entered service in 1985.

In the 1990s, the Marines sent out another contract for upgrades to their MIM-23 Hawk missile systems to allow them to attack short-range ballistic missiles. The TPS-59(V)3 modified the existing TPS-59 radar sets to provide much higher altitude coverage, up to 500,000 ft (150,000 m).

All U.S. TPS-59 radars were decommissioned in September 2020.

=== AN/TPS-77 ===
A further version of the series was introduced as the TPS-117, soon renamed TPS-77. This is a further cut-down of the original design, producing a smaller antenna. Combined with modern electronics, the system is now transportable by a single custom prime mover vehicle. This system has replaced most radars in the UK's network.

== Description ==
The system is a long range (up to 250 nautical miles or 460 kilometres), L-band pencil beam search radar with solid-state transmitters. The AESA principle uses active transmitters in each individual antenna in the 44-by-32 antenna array. The combined power of the entire array is about 25 kW, much lower than the multi-megawatt transmitters found in earlier radar designs. To compensate for the lower power, longer pulses are used. To extract accurate range information, the receivers employ pulse compression. The system design includes a redundant architecture with computer software remote controlled and monitored operations to minimize manning requirements. It is typically also equipped with an identification friend or foe system using a second antenna on top.

The Air Force and the FAA also operate a limited number of AN/FPS-117 radars within the continental United States. The AN/FPS-117 radar is capable of randomly hopping among 18 channels in the 1215-1400 MHz band.

Originally selected for the Alaskan Air Command's SEEK IGLOO project, the radar was also picked to replace the United States Air Force's AN/FPS-67 radar at Berlin's Tempelhof Airport and was commissioned at Tempelhof in July 1984.

The AN/TPS-77 is a version of the same radar mounted on a transportable platform. This is currently the main radar used by the Royal Air Force.

The RRP-117 version is a model which is being supplied to Germany with an offset input from Siemens in fixed-site applications.

In 2011, Lockheed Martin was awarded a contract to upgrade the radars to extend their operational lives through 2025.

== Operators ==
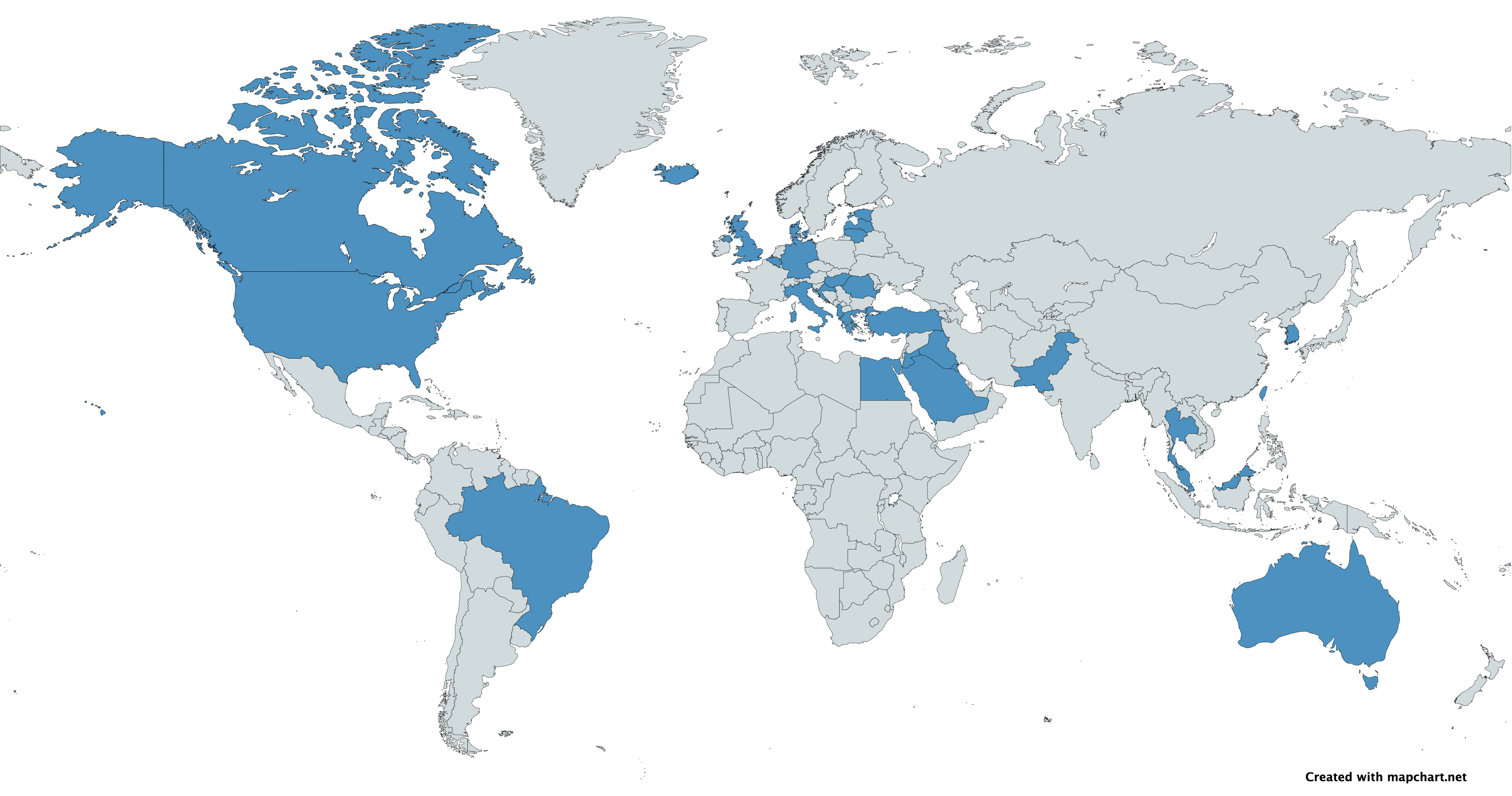
Map with AN-TPS-77 operators in blue

- Albania As of November 2020, Albania Air Force operates a AN/TPS-117 Long-range radar system on Mida mountain near Pukë, which was a joined investment of Albania and the US through Lockheed Martin with $19 million coming from Albania and $3 million from the US. The radar is integrated into the NATO Integrated Air Defense System.
- Australia
- Belgium
- Brazil
- Canada – 17: AN/FPS-117 used in North Warning System (13) and four Canadian Coastal Radar sites. AN/TPS-77 used in mobile radar squadrons.
- Croatia
- Denmark
- Egypt – AN/TPS-59 and AN/TPS-59/M34
- Estonia – Used in Baltic Air Surveillance Network
- Germany – Uses German variant RRP-117
- Hungary
- Greece
- Iceland
- Iraq
- Italy
- Jordan
- Kuwait
- Latvia – Used in Baltic Air Surveillance Network
- Lithuania – Used in Baltic Air Surveillance Network
- Malaysia
- Pakistan – AN/TPS-77. In 2005, the United States Air Force awarded a contract to Lockheed Martin supplying Pakistan with six AN/TPS-77 systems for US$89 million.
- Romania
- Saudi Arabia
- Singapore – Republic of Singapore Air Force
- South Korea – Used on Ulleungdo Island to defend Liancourt Rocks from a territorial dispute with Japan, and on the Korean Demilitarized Zone.
- Taiwan – 7 AN/FPS-117 and 4 AN/TPS-117 acquired in 2002.
- Thailand
- Turkey
- United Kingdom
- United States – Used in North Warning System

== Variants ==
- AN/FPS-117 – Standard fixed version produced by Lockheed Martin.
- AN/TPS-59 - Transportable version produced by Lockheed Martin.
- AN/TPS-77 – Transportable, improved, smaller and more mobile version produced by Lockheed Martin.
- AN/TPS-77 MRR - Transportable, improved, the smallest and the most mobile version produced by Lockheed Martin.
- RRP-117 – German fixed variant of AN/FPS-117 produced by Lockheed Martin, modified by Siemens to meet German Air Force requirements.
- AMES Type 92 - British variant of AN/TPS-77 produced by Lockheed Martin, used by Royal Air Force.

== See also ==
- Bendix AN/FPS-20
- AN/TPS-59
- Ground Master 200
- List of radars
- List of military electronics of the United States
