= Nemirseta =

- District of Palanga
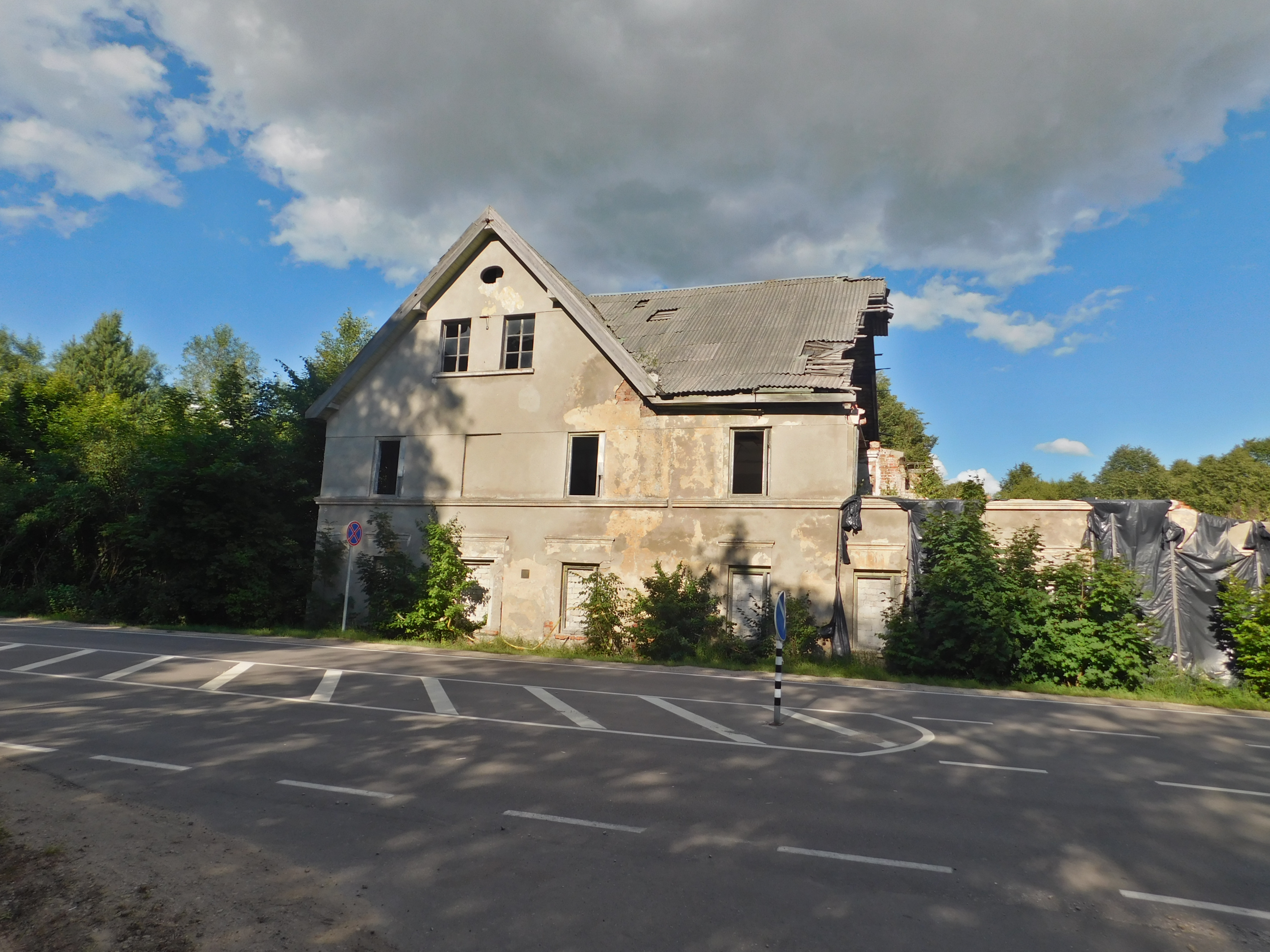
- Former spa house

- Location within Lithuania
- Coordinates: 55°53′N 21°04′E
- Country: Lithuania
- County: Klaipėda County
- Municipality: Palanga city municipality
- Within town limits: 1958
- Time zone: UTC+2 (EET)
  - Summer (DST): UTC+3 (EEST)

Nemirseta (German: Nimmersatt) is a district of the Lithuanian seaside resort Palanga, located on the Baltic coast north of Klaipėda. The place, which consists mainly of two deserted buildings which were formerly an inn and customs house, is notable for having marked for about five centuries the northernmost point of Prussia (i.e. the Province of East Prussia) and the northeastern tip of the German Empire from 1871 to 1920.

== Etymology ==
Its name in German is the term for "yellow-billed stork", although etymologically it is a corruption of the Old Curonian toponym Nimersata denoting marshy land (nemiršele).

== History ==
During the Prussian Crusade from about 1200 onwards, the area of the local Baltic Skalvian and Curonian pagans was conquered by German military orders, at first by the Sword Brethren, after the 1236 Battle of Saule by the Teutonic Knights. When in the early 15th century the State of the Teutonic Order interfered with the neighbouring Grand Duchy of Lithuania and the Kingdom of Poland, culminating in the Polish–Lithuanian–Teutonic War, the 1422 Treaty of Melno finally fixed the borders of the Monastic State with the Lithuanian Samogitia region.

In 1454, King Casimir IV Jagiellon incorporated the area to the Kingdom of Poland upon the request of the anti-Teutonic Prussian Confederation. the Teutonic Order regained authority over the town as a fief of the Polish Crown. In the course of the Protestant Reformation, the Teutonic State in 1525 dissolved and the Nemirseta area became the northernmost outpost of secularized Duchy of Prussia, from 1618 of united Brandenburg-Prussia under the Lutheran House of Hohenzollern, remaining a vassal duchy within the Polish–Lithuanian Commonwealth. By the 1660 Treaty of Oliva the "Great Elector" Frederick William of Brandenburg was able to shift off Polish suzerainty. When the Hohenzollern Kingdom of Prussia merged into the German Empire in 1871, Nimmersatt became its northeasternmost settlement. Schoolchildren were taught the rhyme Nimmersatt, wo das Reich sein Ende hat, which means "Nimmersatt, where the Empire ends". The village included a customs house and an inn (Kurhaus) providing shelter for travellers from and to Imperial Russia's Lithuanian provinces.

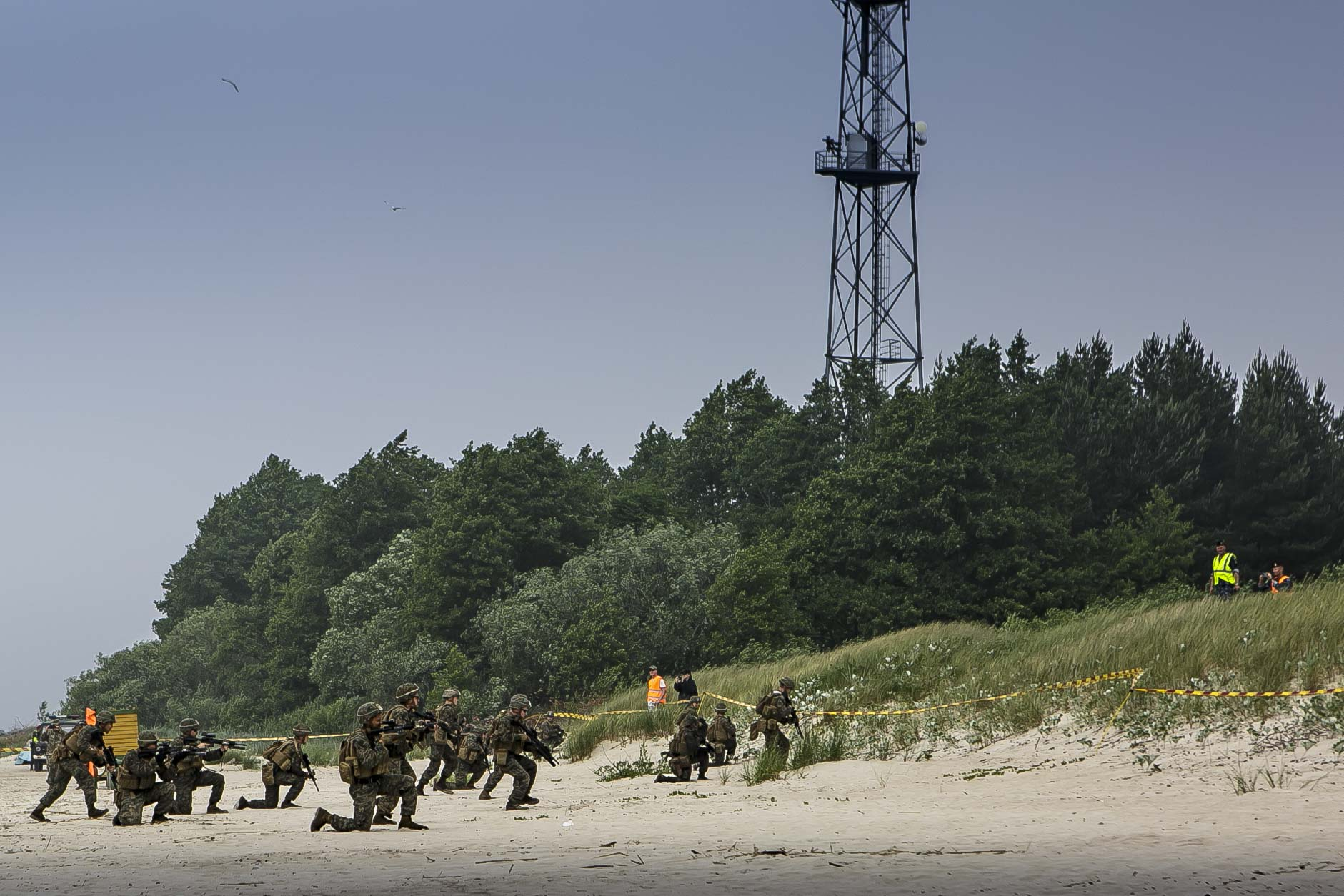
BALTOPS military exercise in 2018

A part of the Province of East Prussia until after World War I, in 1920 Nemirseta was with the Klaipėda Region (Memelland) separated from Germany according to the Treaty of Versailles. It was put under administration of the League of Nations and controlled by French forces, until the 1923 Klaipėda Revolt, after which it was annexed by Lithuania. For a brief period Nemirseta again became a border checkpoint, when Lithuanian Foreign Minister Juozas Urbšys under pressure by Nazi Germany in March 1939 signed an agreement after which the Klaipėda Region was reannexed by Germany. The secret protocol of the Molotov–Ribbentrop Pact allocated it to the German sphere of influence.

After World War II, according to the 1945 Potsdam Agreement, the region again became part of Lithuania, although as the Soviet-controlled Lithuanian Soviet Socialist Republic and the remaining German population was expelled. Part of a large Soviet Army proving ground, the place now called Nemirseta finally lost its meaning as a German border town and most of the buildings were demolished. The area was incorporated into the Palanga municipality in 1975.

== See also ==
- Kutuzovo, Krasnoznamensky District, Kaliningrad Oblast, formerly known as Schirwindt, the easternmost settlement in the old German Reich
- Gravelotte, the westernmost settlement in Germany from 1871-1918
