= The Dutchman's Cap (Lithuania) =

Hill on the coast of Lithuania

Coordinates: 55°47′48″N 21°04′02″E

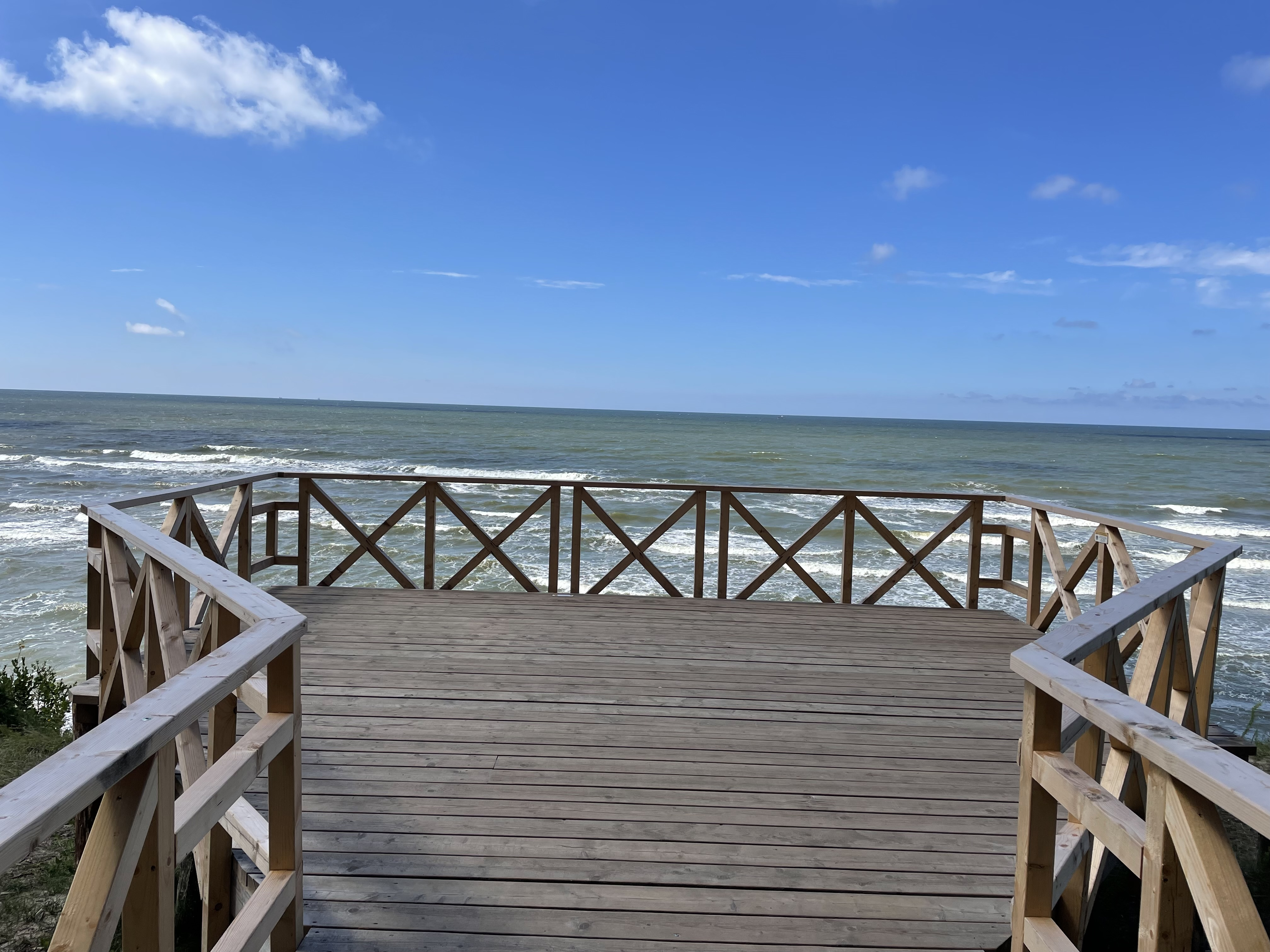
The Dutchman's Cap

The Dutchman's Cap (Lithuanian: Olando kepurė) is a hill with a 24.4 m high bluff, which is in Lithuania's Seaside Regional Park, near Karklė and 2 km north of Giruliai on the Baltic Sea coast. It was created 12000–15000 years ago during the last Baltic glaciation.

The name stems from an alleged similarity of the high bank to a mariner's cap.

== Geology ==
The hill is a parabolic dune created by aeolian processes on a moraine ridge. The location is now subject to strong erosion by the Baltic Sea, which is exposing various-sized boulders from the moraine. As a consequence, boulder rubble has accumulated on the so-called beach. As the bluff's base is destroyed, earth slips down the bluff's entire face, in an example of mass wasting.

=== Mammoth tusk discovery ===
A mammoth tusk was unearthed on the hill in August 2024. The tusk is believed to be over 10,000 years old, dating back to the Late Pleistocene. The tusk, measuring approximately 55 centimetres, was discovered by a passerby named Artūras while hiking along the coastal cliffs. He noticed a wood-like object embedded in clay, which turned out to be a well-preserved section of a mammoth tusk. Specialists from the Museum of Lithuania Minor and the Seaside Regional Park were called in to excavate the find.

The tusk is part of a larger pattern of Ice Age-era remains along Lithuania’s Baltic coast. According to the Seaside Regional Park’s director, over 50 mammoth bone finds have been recorded in the region. The Dutchman's Cap find adds a well-preserved specimen to this record and offers new research opportunities in paleontology and Pleistocene-era climate studies.

After initial documentation, the tusk was transported to the Museum of Lithuania Minor for preservation. It is undergoing conservation treatment and will be publicly exhibited upon completion.

== Historical importance ==
The Dutchman's Cap has long been a navigational guide for sailors and fishermen, and so in the early 19th century, markers were erected here, and have been shown on charts ever since. A view of the sea with a steep shoreline and stony beaches opens up here. The top of the bluff is a good place to watch birds flying above the sea.
