= Karmėlava =

Karmėlava Кормяловъ (historical name)
- Town
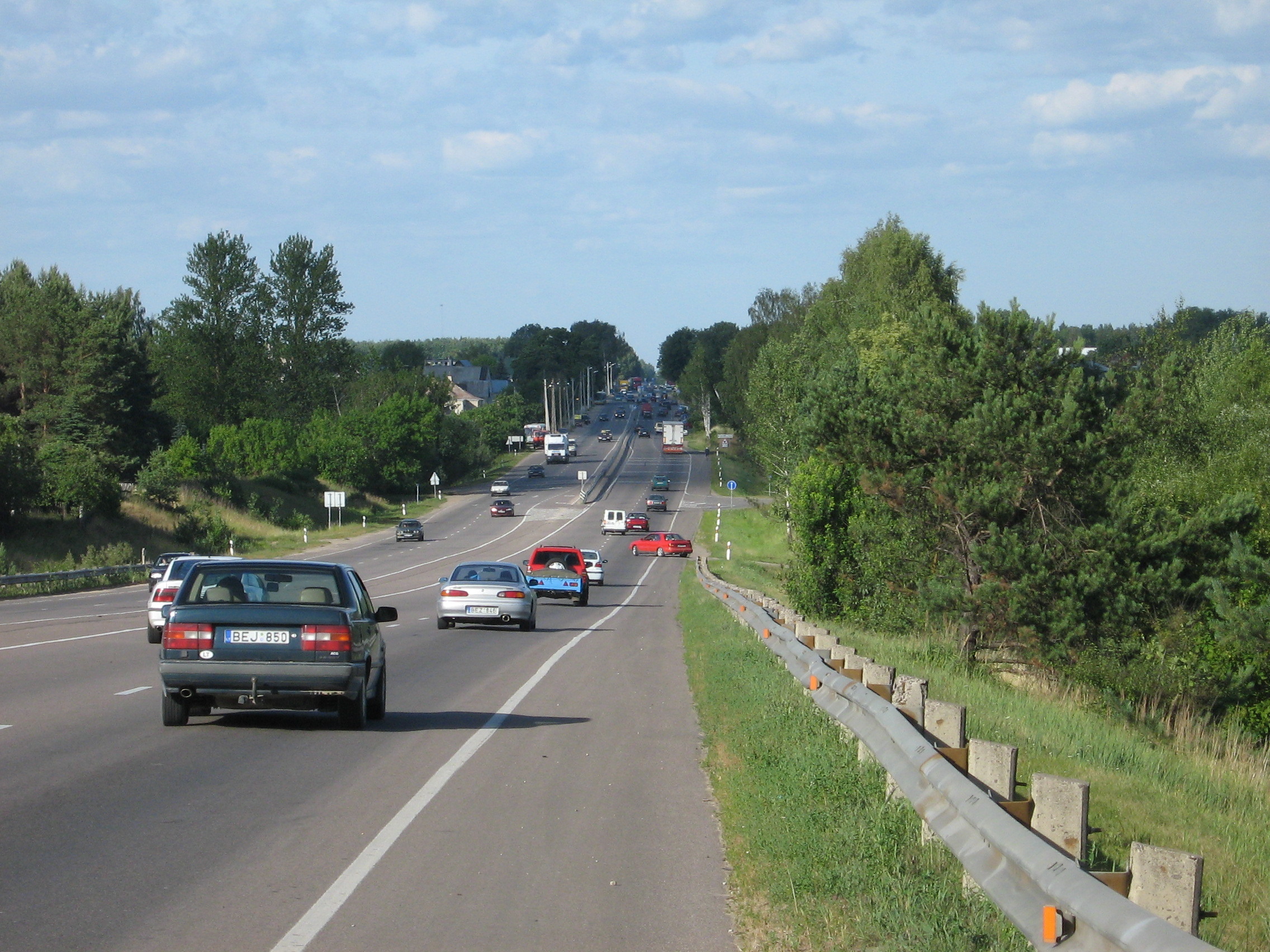

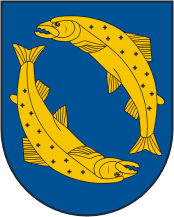
- Coat of arms

- Location in Lithuania
- Coordinates: 54°58′20″N 24°04′0″E
- Country: Lithuania
- Ethnographic region: Aukštaitija
- County: Kaunas County
- Municipality: Kaunas district municipality

Area
  - Total: 9.90 km^{2} (3.82 sq mi)

Population (2021)
  - Total: 1,195
- Time zone: UTC+2 (EET)
  - Summer (DST): UTC+3 (EEST)
- Area code: 37037

Karmėlava is a small town in Kaunas district municipality, on the left bank of the Neris River, by the A6 (Kaunas–Zarasai–Daugpilis) highway, 6 km northeast of the northern border of Kaunas and near the second-busiest civil airport in Lithuania, Kaunas International Airport. In Karmėlava, there is also a full-time, self-study general education school, Karmėlavos Balio Buračo Gymnasium

== Geography ==
A wide panorama of the Neris opens from the Karmėlava hillfort. Next to the town is a smaller settlement – Karmėlava II.

== History ==
Karmėlava is one of the oldest settlements in Lithuania. The first inhabitants of Karmėlava appeared in the Stone Age, their campsite was on a wide dune near the village of Rykštynė. There is a Karmėlava cemetery and the 14th-century Karmėlava hillfort.

Karmėlava was founded in 1387 by Grand Duke Władysław II Jagiełło of Lithuania. The area, called Kremilow, is mentioned in descriptions of the Die Littauischen Wegeberichte at the end of the 14th century.

In 1549, the Karmėlava manor belonged to Barbara Radziwiłł. Karmėlava is marked on the first map of the Grand Duchy of Lithuania in 1613.

In the 19th century, Karmėlava was a village Užusaliai rural municipality, Kaunas county.

In 1812, during Napoleon's invasion of Russia, a corps under Marshall M. Nejas was stationed in Karmėlava as the army crossed the Nemunas near Kaunas. In the November Uprising, the village served as a base for rebels led by Mauricijus Prozor, who launched several attacks on Kaunas. In mid-April 1831, a major battle took place near Turžėnai between the insurgents and the Russian imperial forces. Residents of Karmėlava also participated in the January Uprising.

In 1918–1940, a girls' farm and home economics school operated in the former Karmėlava manor.

== Residents ==
In 1789, there were 20 villages in Karmėlava.

Demographic development between 1865 and 2021
| 1865 | 1923 | 1959 | 1970 | 1977 | 1979 |
|---|---|---|---|---|---|
| 190 | 470 | 1543 | 2584 | 3480 | 3664 |
| 1985 | 1989 | 2001 | 2011 | 2021 | – |
| 3375 | 1296 | 2886 | 1395 | 1195 | – |

== Coat of arms ==
In 1720, the governor of Karmėlava, Jonas Mykolas Poklevskis Koziela, granted this state-owned estate the privilege of a market. Jews were allowed to settle in the town. On March 17, 1792, the last king of the Polish-Lithuanian Commonwealth, Stanisław August Poniatowski, granted the town Magdeburg rights and a coat of arms. On November 24, 1998, the decree of the President of Lithuania confirmed the coat of arms of Karmėlava.

== Economics ==
=== Aviation ===
Kaunas Airport is located directly within the town, providing most of its economic growth, and has operated since 1988. Companies which operate include Apatas Air, Aviakompanija Lietuva, Ryanair, and Wizz Air.

In 2002, the Baltic Air Surveillance Network and Kaunas Aviation Meteorological Station were established here. Collected information is reported back to the Combined Air Operations Centre in Germany.

=== Commercial ===
Companies include furniture producer Magdaris, window and door producer Gipura, and bakeries like Mentora ir Ko and Baltasis pyragas.

== Sport ==
Karmėlava has a football team called FK Neris Karmėlava.
