= Lithuanian Armed Forces =

Armed forces of Lithuania

- Lietuvos ginkluotosios pajėgos
- Insignia of the Lithuanian Armed Forces

- Flag of the Lithuanian Armed Forces
- Founded: 23 November 1918 (first armed formations c. 12th century)
- Current form: 25 April 1990
- Service branches: Land Force; Air Force; Navy; Special Operations Force; War time only: Riflemen's Union; Public Security Service; State Border Guard Service
- Headquarters: Vilnius
- Website: Official website

Leadership
- Commander-in-Chief: President Gitanas Nausėda
- Minister of National Defence: Robertas Kaunas
- Chief of Defence: General Raimundas Vaikšnoras

Personnel
- Military age: 18–55
- Conscription: 9 months
- Active personnel: 23,000 (2021)^{[a]} 14,150 paramilitary (2021)^{[b]}
- Reserve personnel: Active reserve 28,000, total reserve 104,000 (2021)

Expenditure
- Budget: €4.79 billion (2026)
- Percent of GDP: 5.38% (2026)

Industry
- Foreign suppliers: Denmark; Finland; France; Germany; Israel; Norway; Poland; Spain; Sweden; United Kingdom; United States

Related articles
- History: 1918–20 Lithuanian Wars of Independence; 1944–53 Lithuanian partisans 1994 Bosnian War; 2001–2021 War in Afghanistan (2001–2021); 2003–2008 Invasion of Iraq; 2004–Present Kosovo Force; 2013–2024 EUTM Mali; 2013–Present Operation Atalanta; 2014 Operation Sangaris; 2015–present EU Navfor Med; 2017–2023 MINUSMA
- Ranks: Lithuanian military ranks

The Lithuanian Armed Forces (Lithuanian: Lietuvos ginkluotosios pajėgos) are the military of Lithuania. The Lithuanian Armed Forces consist of the Lithuanian Land Forces, the Lithuanian Navy, the Lithuanian Air Force and the Lithuanian Special Operations Force. In wartime, the Lithuanian State Border Guard Service (which is under the supervision of the Ministry of the Interior in peacetime) becomes part of the Lithuanian Armed Forces.

The purpose of the Lithuanian Armed Forces are to be the principal deterrent against any security threat to the nation. Lithuania's defence system is based on the concept of "total and unconditional defence" mandated by Lithuania's National Security Strategy. The goal of Lithuania's defence policy is to prepare their society for general defence and to integrate Lithuania into Western security and defence structures. The Ministry of National Defence is responsible for combat forces, search and rescue, and intelligence operations.

Male conscription is in place since 2015, when it was reinstated after being ended in 2008, due to concerns about the geopolitical environment in light of the Russo-Ukrainian War. Female service in Lithuania is currently voluntary, but it has become the subject of growing political and public debate, with defence officials and policymakers advocating a greater role for women in the armed forces and some leaders warning that Lithuania may ultimately need to introduce female or universal conscription in response to long-term security challenges, demographic constraints, and the evolving regional security environment.

In early 2022, Lithuania's defence budget for 2022 was approximately €1.05 billion,^{[c]} but it was increased to €1.5 billion on 17 March 2022. In 2024, the budget was raised to €2.3 billion and is projected to reach 3.03% of GDP.

== History ==
=== Grand Ducal Lithuanian Army ===
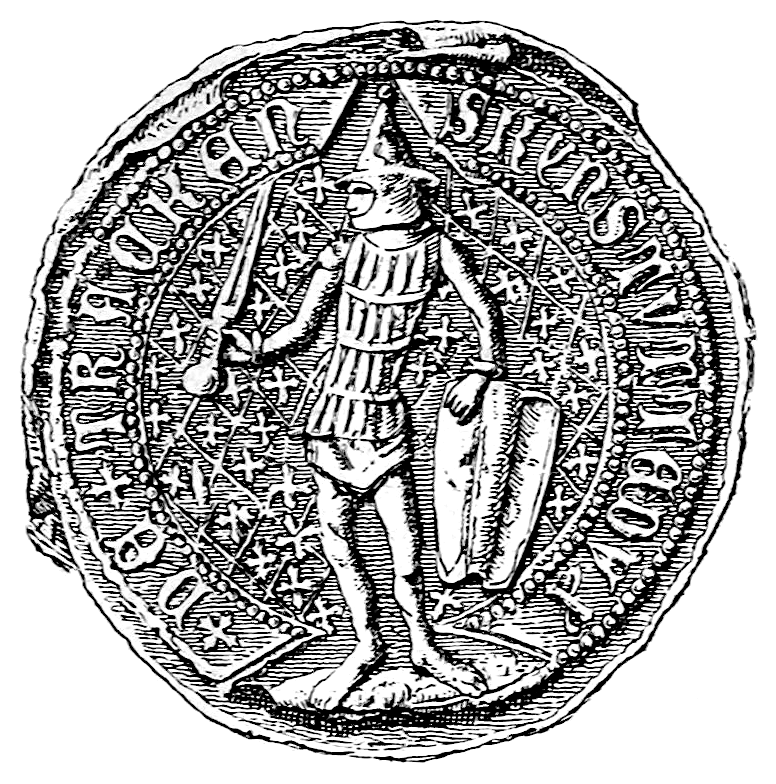
Seal of Grand Duke Kęstutis from 1379 depicting a Lithuanian infantryman

The Lithuanian military originates in the Grand Ducal Lithuanian Army, active from the 13th century to 1795. It fought many major battles, such as the Battle of Blue Waters (1362/63), Battle of Grunwald (1410), Battle of Orsha (1514) and Battle of Kircholm (1605). After the Union of Lublin in 1569, the Lithuanian Army remained equal to the Polish Crown army in the military of the Polish–Lithuanian Commonwealth until the Third Partition in 1795.

Similarly to other medieval European states, the army was raised by the nobility during the Late Middle Ages. By the 17th century, it was mostly outclassed by professional forces and a standing army was instituted.

==== 13th century ====
From the 12th century's end and into the 13th century, Lithuania frequently went to war against the western and southwestern Rus' states, Kingdom of Galicia-Volhynia and Duchy of Masovia, and also devastated the lands along the Daugava and elsewhere. From the early 1200s, Lithuanians fought against the Swordbrothers, then from 1237 against the Livonian Order, and from the second half of the 13th century's against the State of the Teutonic Order. Fighting on Lithuania's northern and western frontiers was unceasing, the Lithuanian state expanded southwards and eastwards in the Late Middle Ages. The Lithuanian army was mobile, as it had to fight on many fronts: the State of the Teutonic Order to the west, the Livonian Order to the north, the Golden Horde and its vassal Muscovy to the east, and the Tatar khanates to the south. According to 13th-century sources, Lithuanian soldiers rode horses on military expeditions but fought on foot, arranged in three rows during battles. The best-armed and most experienced fought in the front, while the least experienced and lightly armed were in the last row. Furthermore, the Lithuanians were skilled at fighting using spears, especially on horseback. The earliest written mention of such tactics, from 1208, says that Lithuanians on horses threw spears at their enemies.

Although the Germans initially had superior weaponry in the 13th century, the Lithuanians won the Battles of Saule (1236), Durbe (1260), Karuse (1270) and the Aizkraukle (1279). However they were less successful against enemy fortifications, especially brick castles. Eventually the front lines stabilised over time, and the one against the Livonian Order more or less followed the modern Latvia–Lithuania border, while the one against the Teutonic Order was close to the Nemunas. A castle system fortified the Lithuanian side of the border along the river.

==== 14th century ====
Over the 14th century, the Teutonic and Livonian orders organised raids into Lithuania. Lithuanians reciprocated by raiding their respective territories, but the Lithuanian raids were fewer in number. The Lithuanians won the Battle of Medininkai (1320), but lost the Battle of Strėva (1348). More and more, the Teutonic Order destroyed the Lithuanian castle system along the Nemunas and built their own castles near the Lithuanian ones. As the German and Livonian orders were constantly reinforced by Christian European countries, it became increasingly difficult to defend Lithuania solely by military means. A new generation of the Lithuanian Grand Dukes, Jogaila and Vytautas the Great, used not only military, but also diplomatic and political means, for example Lithuanian baptism in 1387, to protect Lithuania.

Meanwhile, on the other side of Lithuania, the Golden Horde's army was destroyed in the Battle of Blue Waters (1362–1363). In 1368, 1370, and 1372, the Lithuanian Grand Duke Algirdas led a military expeditions against Muscovy. However, the Battle of the Vorksla River (1399) was a decisive victory for the Golden Horde.

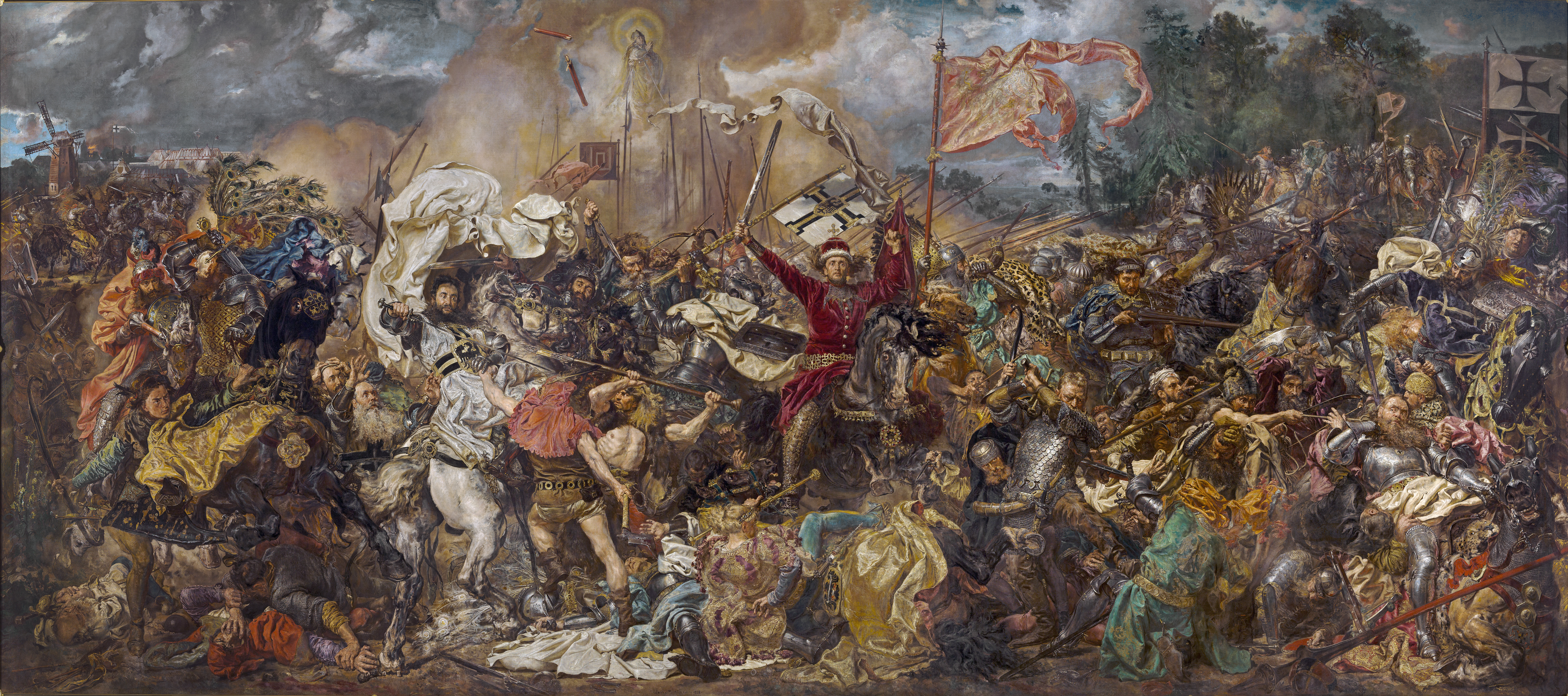
Battle of Grunwald (1410) was one of the largest in medieval Europe

==== 15th century ====
Finally, the German Teutonic Order was crushed in the Battle of Grunwald (1410) (known as Battle of Žalgiris in Lithuanian historiography), which was the largest Middle Age battle in Central and Eastern Europe. In this key battle, the Lithuanian Army was led by Vytautas the Great. Under him, the Lithuanian Army attacked the lands of the Republics of Pskov, in 1426, and Novgorod, in 1428. The Grand Duchy of Lithuania had internal civil wars in the first half of the 15th century. The Lithuania Army engaged in biological warfare already in 1422, when it catapulted manure made from infected victims into an opposing Bohemian town as part of the Hussite Wars. In 1435, Sigismund Kęstutaitis' army defeated the opposing army, which included troops of the Livonian Order, led by Švitrigaila in the Battle of Wiłkomierz.

==== 16th century ====
This century was marked by war of Lithuania against Muscovy and the Crimean Khanate, against whom they won the Battle of Kletsk in 1506. The strengthening Grand Duchy of Moscow starting in the late 15th century waged unceasing wars over Lithuania's eastern territories. In 1514, during the fourth war, the Lithuanians triumphed over the numerically larger Muscovite army in the famous Battle of Orsha. However, Lithuania lost a part of its eastern lands, most notably the strategically important fortress of Smolensk. Lithuania fought against Muscovy in the Livonian War and won against the Muscovite army, twice its size in the Battle of Ula in 1564. Three years into the Livonian War, the Treaty of Vilnius. made Livonia part of Lithuania in 1561 with the Union of Lublin concluded in 1569. In the late 1570s and early 1580s, the Lithuanian and Polish armies cooperated in Stephen Báthory's incursions into Russia.

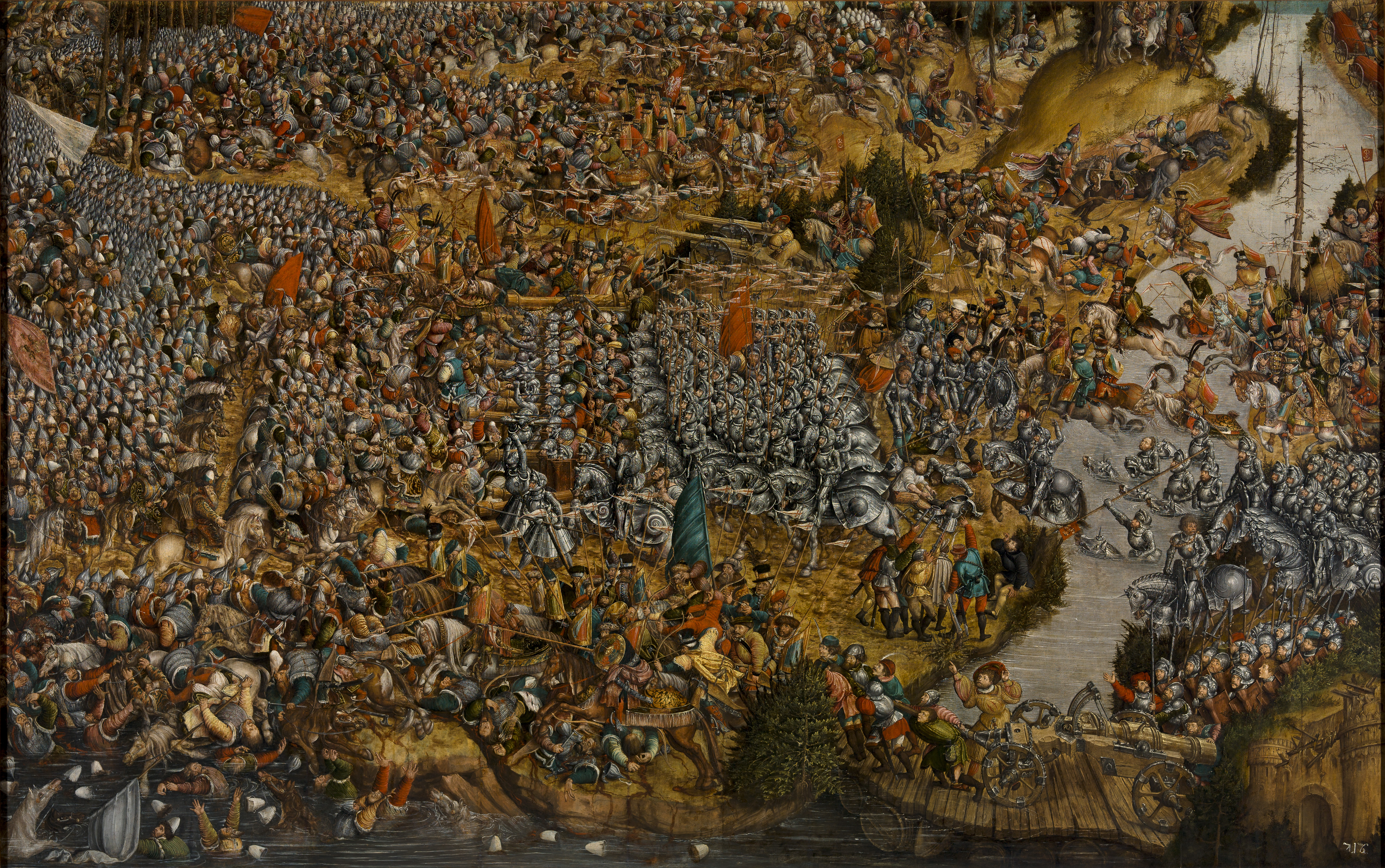
The victory of the Polish-Lithuanian forces over the Grand Duchy of Moscow at the Battle of Orsha in 1514

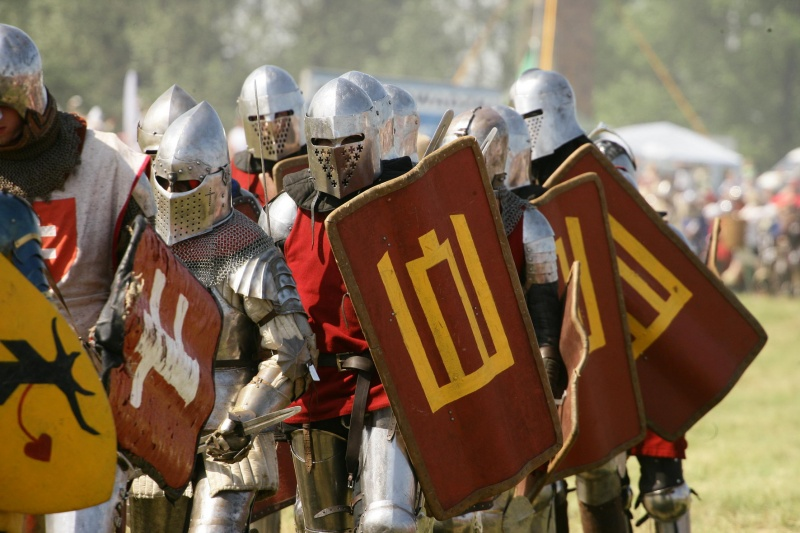
Modern reconstruction of the Lithuanian knights from the 14-15th century

==== 17th century ====
The 17th century was marked by wars against Sweden, the Tsardom of Muscovy and the Ottoman Empire. The Lithuanian army and the Polish army fought against the Ottoman forces notably at both Battles of Khotyn in 1621 and 1673. During the war with Sweden from 1600 to 1629, the Lithuanian army defeated Swedish forces three times their number at the Battle of Kircholm in 1605. However, this war highlighted the Commonwealth's difficulty recruiting and retaining enough troops, better arming its soldiers with firearms and bettering their use. Sweden seized a significant part of Livonia as part of Swedish Livonia. In the first half of the 17th century, Smolensk returned to Lithuania following the Smolensk War.

The Commonwealth's military weakness in the middle and late 17th century was evidenced in the Deluge. In 1655, the much-smaller Lithuanian army could not defend the Lithuanian capital of Vilnius against Muscovite attack. This was the first time that Vilnius was occupied by a foreign state. The Swedish and Muscovite armies occupied large parts of Lithuania. Nevertheless, Lithuania succeeded in holding out and liberated Vilnius, Kaunas, Samogitia and the eastern Voivodeships, except for Smolensk Voivodeship and other parts. Militarily speaking, however, the Grand Duchy of Lithuania was weakening.

==== 18th century ====
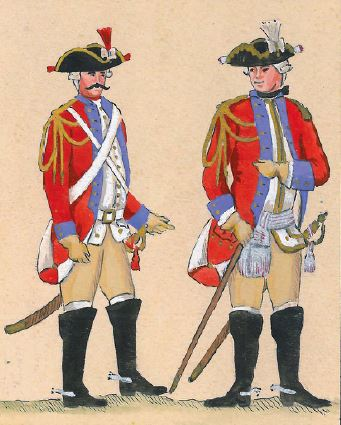
The Lithuanian Army's Life Dragoons Regiment, part of the Royal Guards (1775)

During the Great Northern War the Lithuanian Army no longer defended the country and the Lithuanian magnates' private armies supported different sides. Throughout the 18th century, the many nobles confederations sought different political goals. The Bar Confederation (1768–1772), which happened partly in Lithuania, attempted but failed to stem the increasing influence of Imperial Russia and the First partition of the Polish-Lithuanian Commonwealth followed. In the face of the possible loss of independence, military reforms in the Four Years' Sejm (1788–1792) significantly expanded the Lithuanian army, which reached a strength of 17,500. Attempts to make the Commonwealth's armies equal those of neighbouring absolute monarchies were unsuccessful and the unsuccessful War of 1792 resulted in the Second Partition.

The Polish and Lithuanian armies put up a spirited fight against the Imperial Russian Army and the Prussian Army in the Kościuszko Uprising. In addition to regular forces, many ad hoc units such as the Vilnian National Guard also fought, as well as many irregular units. In the end, the Uprising was defeated and much of the remainder of the Lithuanian Army was lost in the Battle of Praga on 4 November 1794. With the uprising defeated, the Grand Duchy of Lithuania and the Kingdom of Poland ended with the Third Partition, and their respective armies being disbanded.

=== Interwar and post-war periods ===
Size of active Lithuanian Army during the interwar
Date	Total number
5 March 1919	3,000
24 January 1920	28,903
8 September 1920	27,802
1 January 1921	43,996
1 November 1924	13,241
1 May 1926	7,894
1 January 1928	16,483
1 December 1934	19,784
1 March 1938	25,655
5 September 1939	37,027
30 September 1939	89,470
1 March 1940	31,895

After Lithuania's restoration on 16 February 1918, the country immediately began creating an army. The Ministry of Defence's first order, issued on 23 November 1918, is considered to mark the establishment of the modern Lithuanian Armed Forces. The newly-formed army almost immediately fought three wars of independence. Having won the Lithuanian–Soviet War and the war against the Bermontians, Lithuania lost large chunks of territory, including its capital Vilnius in the Polish–Lithuanian War. Armoured equipment in the interwar period, primarily consisted of light tanks and armored cars: French Renault FT-17s, British Vickers Carden-Loyd M1934s and M1936s, Swedish Landsverk-181, and German Ehrhardt E-V/4. In 1935, the country opened an advanced military research laboratory, specialising in chemical materials for ammunition as well as defence against chemical warfare. The construction of the laboratory was supervised by Juozas Vėbra. In 1940, Lithuania had a considerable Air Force, consisting of 118 aircraft with about half of them designed and produced locally. During the World War II, Lithuania was invaded by both Nazis and Soviets, which eventually concluded in Soviet occupation. The Lithuanian Armed Forces transformed into the Lithuanian People's Army in 1940 under the People's Government of Lithuania. Despite Soviet deportations from Lithuania, armed Lithuanian resistance lasted until the 1950s.

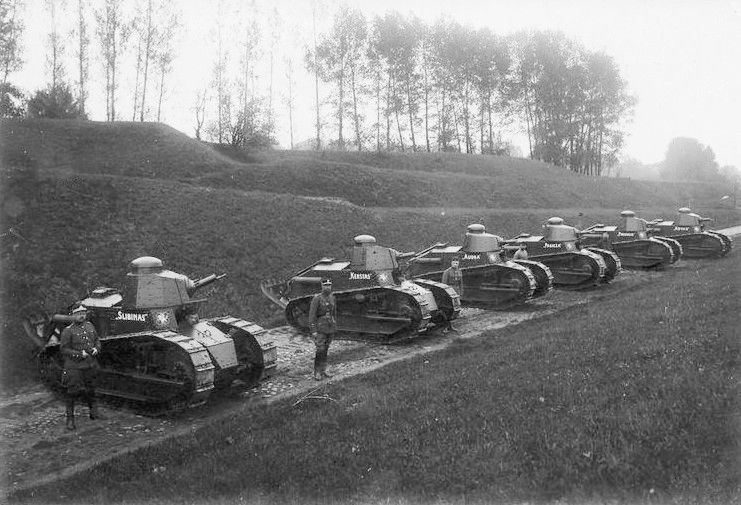
Lithuanian Renault FT-17 tanks in 1924

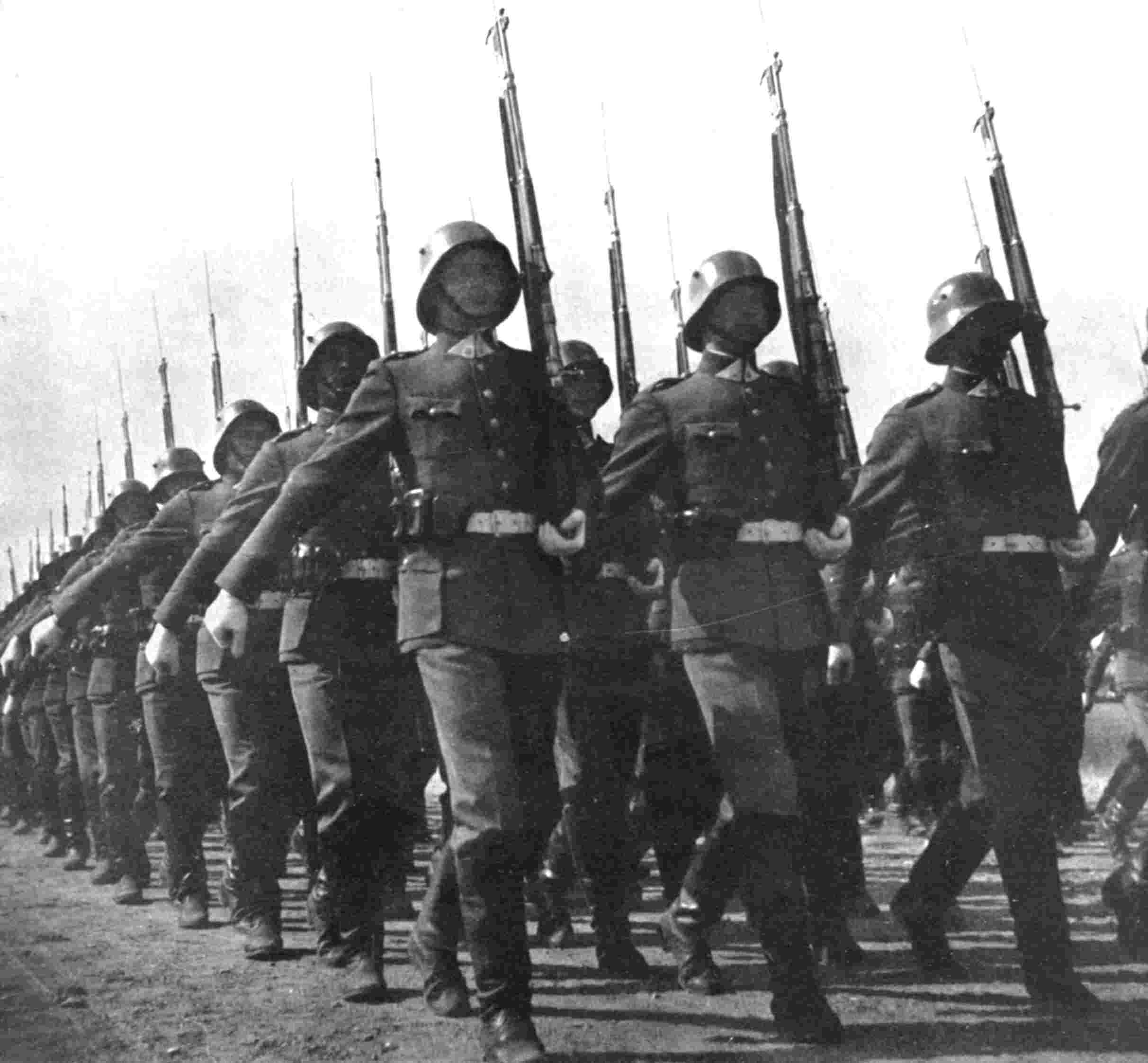
Lithuanian Army in 1938

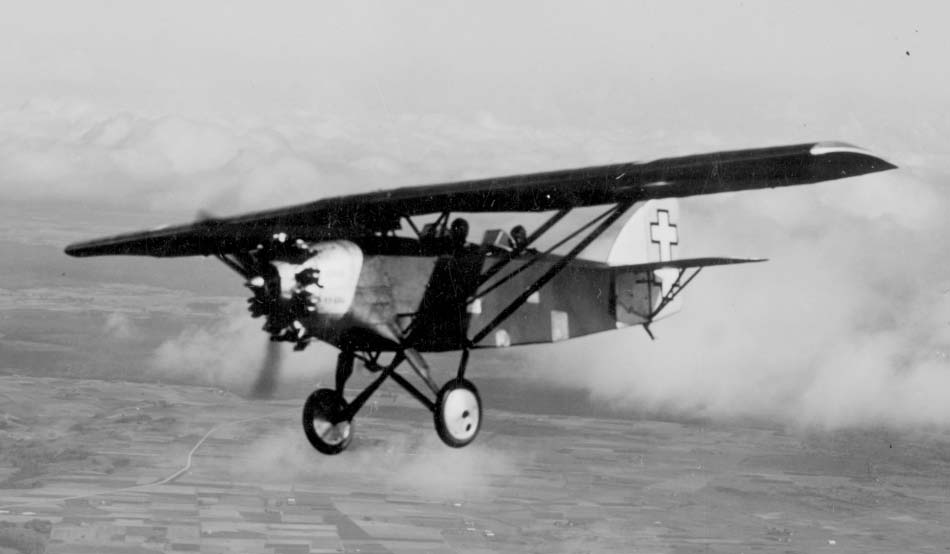
Lithuanian design ANBO III aircraft from 1930s

=== Restoration and NATO ===
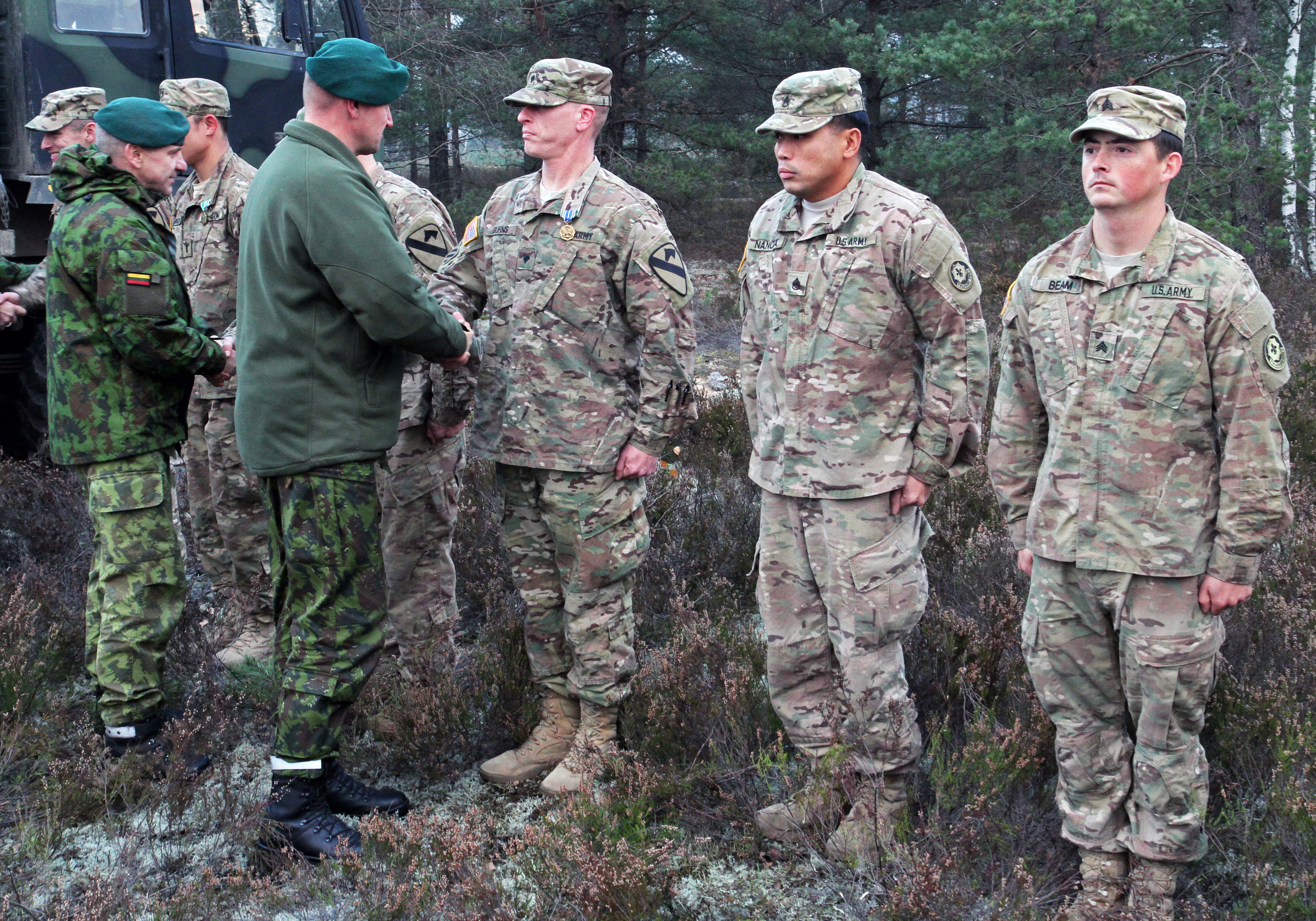
Lithuanian soldiers shaking hands with the American soldiers during the Operation Atlantic Resolve in 2014

Following the restoration of independence, the defence forces were formally reestablished on 25 April 1990 with the creation of the Department of National Defence. After the January Events, the Voluntary National Defence Service was formed of lightly armed volunteers. The Lithuanian Armed Forces were officially restored on 19 November 1992. Western European countries, especially Sweden, helped to arm the initial force by selling or donating excess equipment. Lithuania began the modernisation of its military, becoming the first European country to acquire the US-made FGM-148 Javelin systems in 2001 and the FIM-92 Stinger systems in 2002.

Lithuania applied for NATO membership in 1994 and eventually joined the alliance in 2004. It has modernised its armed forces and participated in various international missions including the NATO-led mission in Afghanistan. Conscription ended in September 2008, but was reintroduced in 2015 due to deteriorating geopolitical environment after the Russia's military intervention in Ukraine. NATO also responded by establishing the NATO Enhanced Forward Presence in 2017 with a battlegroup in Lithuania which was led by Germany.

=== After the Russian invasion of Ukraine ===
Crews of the 1st Division's "Iron Wolf" Brigade tank battalion carrying out loading and live-fire exercises with Leopard 2 tanks.

After the 2022 Russian invasion of Ukraine, Lithuania rapidly increased the defence spending, becoming one of the top spenders by GDP in the NATO military alliance. The following years marked major acquisitions, including M142 HIMARS with the ATACMS tactical ballistic missiles, additional NASAMS medium-range air defence systems and artillery ammunition. In 2023, Lithuanian leadership approved the plans to form an army division, based on the three army brigades. As part of the plan, the country also decided to acquire Leopard 2 tanks. In 2023, Germany agreed to deploy a brigade in Lithuania on a permanent basis. The Bundeswehr's 45th Panzer Brigade, consisting of ~5,000 troops, is scheduled to be deployed by 2027. On 28 January 2025, the 1st Division was re-created.

== Organization ==
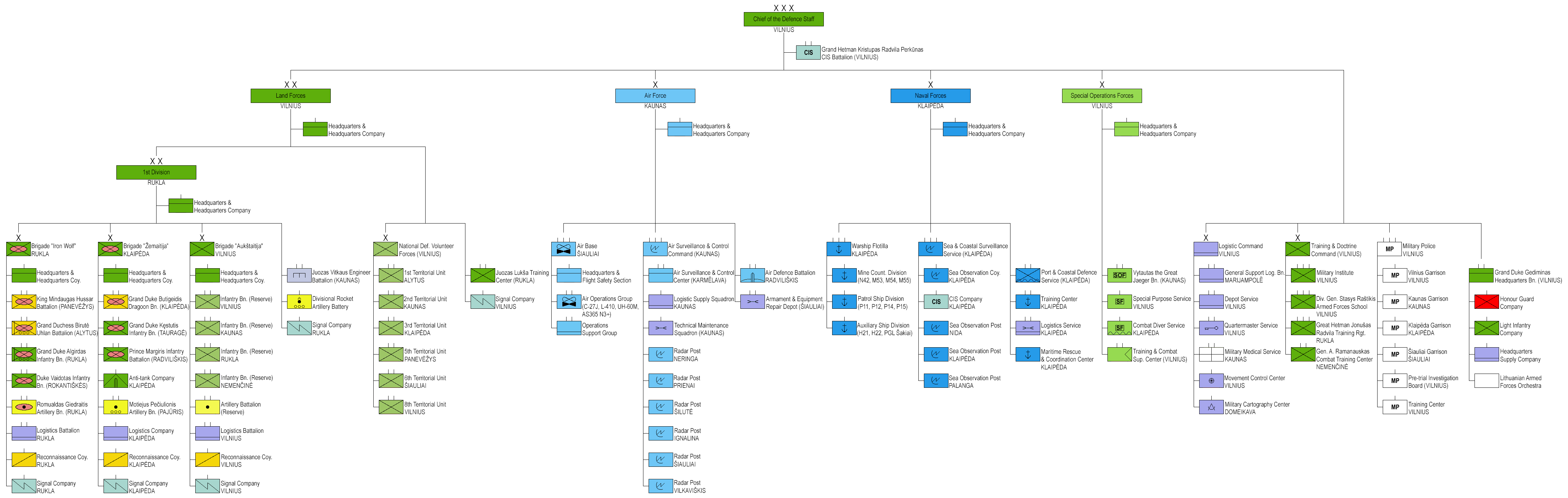
Structure of the Lithuanian Armed Forces, 2025 (click to enlarge)

The President of Lithuania is the commander-in-chief of the Lithuanian Armed Forces according to the Constitution of Lithuania. Ministry of National Defence is directly responsible for the organisation of the defence system. Chief of Defence (Lithuanian: Kariuomenės vadas) is subordinate to the Minister of National Defence. Defence Staff (Lithuanian: Gynybos štabas) of the Armed Forces is responsible for the preparation of defence and mobilisation plans.

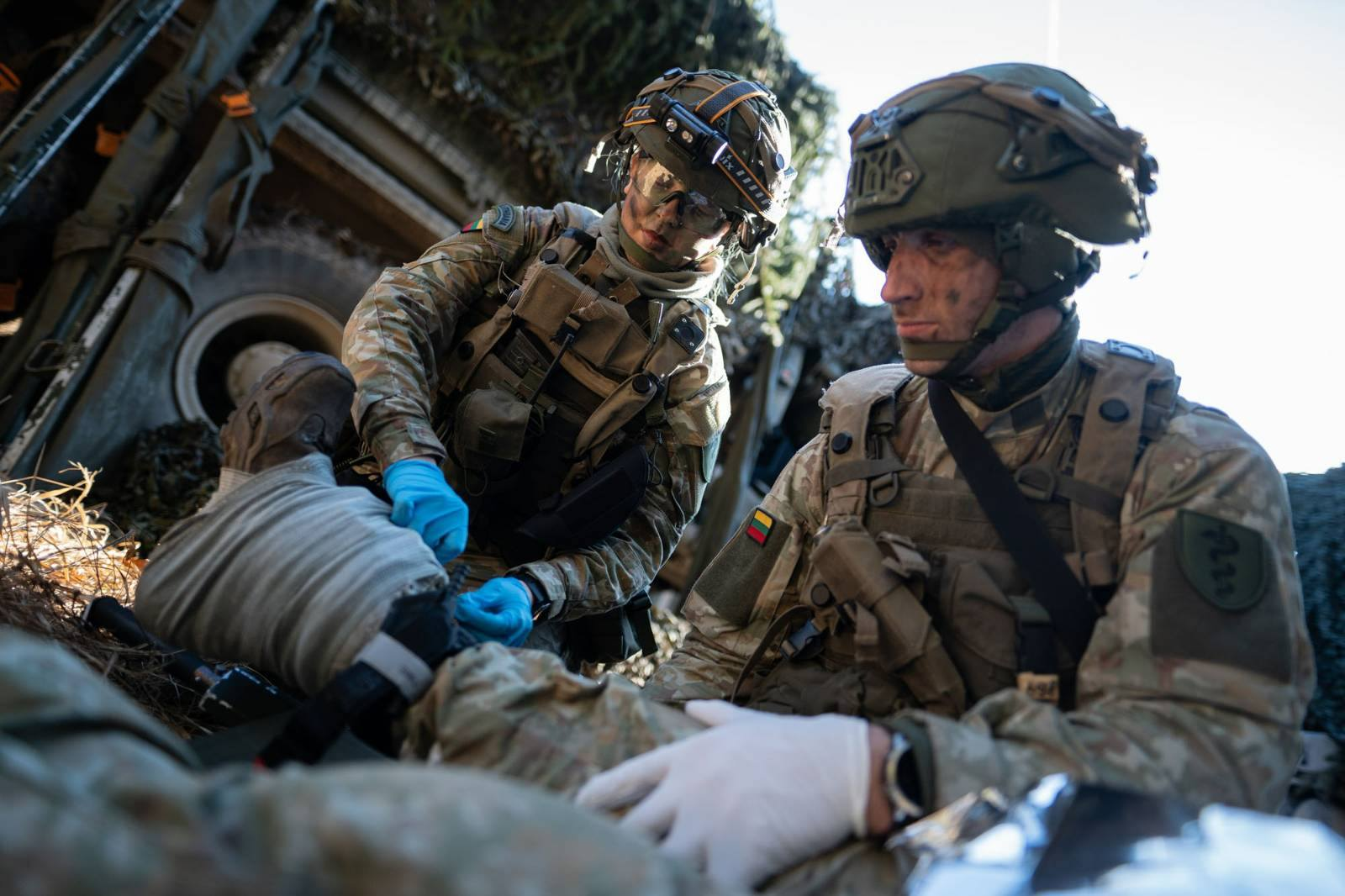
Logistics Command medics during „Allied Spirit 2025“ exercise

The Lithuanian Armed Forces consist of the Lithuanian Land Force, Lithuanian Air Force, Lithuanian Navy, Lithuanian Special Operations Force and other units:

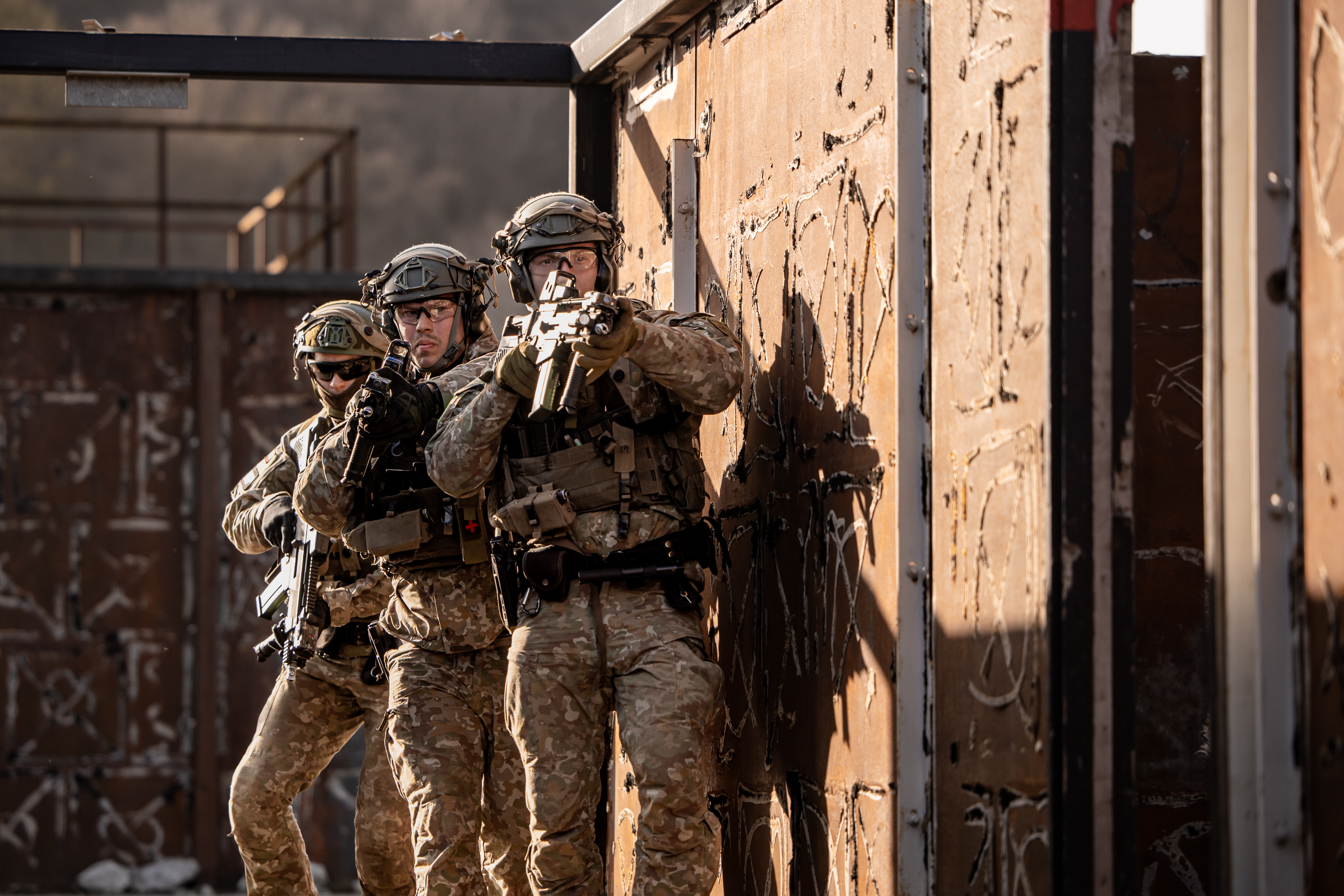
Lithuanian Military Police during „Allied Spirit 2025“ exercise

Support branches of the Armed Forces:

- Training and Doctrine Command;
- Military Commandant's Offices Command;
- Cyber Defence Command;
- Logistics Command;
- Military Ordinariate;
- Military Police.

Separate units directly subordinated to the Armed Forces Command:

- Autonomous Remote Unmanned Operations "ANBO" Formation;
- Finance and Accounting Department;
- Grand Duke Gediminas Staff Battalion;
  - Lithuanian Armed Forces Headquarters Band.
- Lithuanian Armed Forces Officers Club;
- Lithuanian Armed Forces Sports Club (CISM delegation);
- Department of Strategic Communications;
- Administration of Lithuanian Military Aviation.

Directly subordinated to the Chief of Defence are the Special Operations Force and Military Police. The Reserve Forces are under command of the Lithuanian National Defence Volunteer Forces. Lithuanian Riflemen's Union is a paramilitary organization that cooperates with the Armed Forces, but it is not part of them. However, during the state of war, its armed formations fall under the command of the Armed Forces. The same applies to the State Border Guard Service and the Public Security Service.

=== Land Forces ===
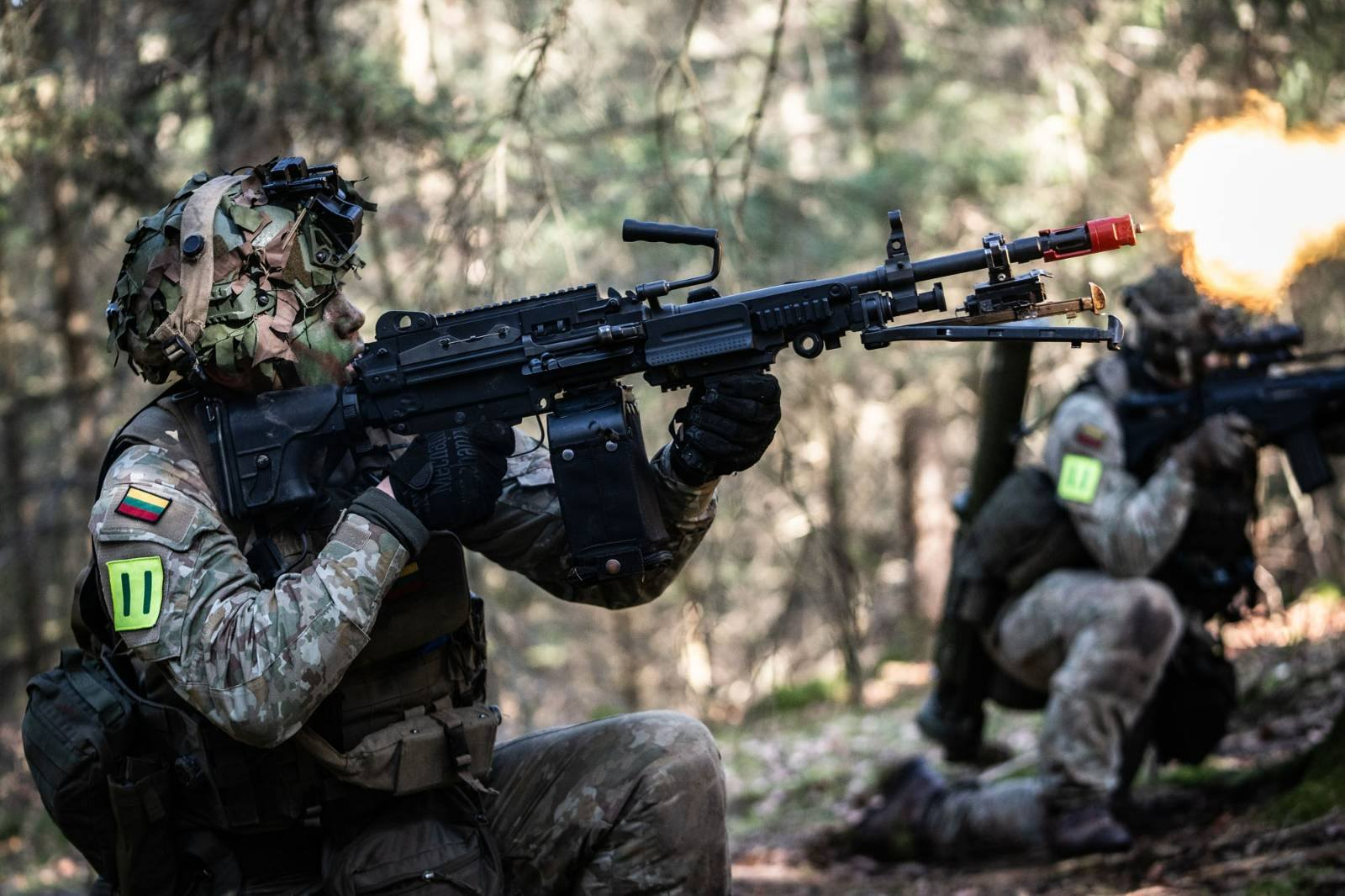
Lithuanian 1st Division soldiers during „Allied Spirit 2025“ exercise

The core of the Lithuanian Land Forces is the 1st Division, comprising three infantry brigades, dedicated support battalions, and two branch regiments - the Colonel Juozas Vitkus Engineer Regiment and the Artillery Regiment. Certain units from other service branches are also operationally assigned to the division. Meanwhile, the Major Juozas Lukša Land Forces Training Center reports directly to the Land Forces Headquarters, and the National Defence Volunteer Forces provide a brigade-sized capability structured into six territorial units.

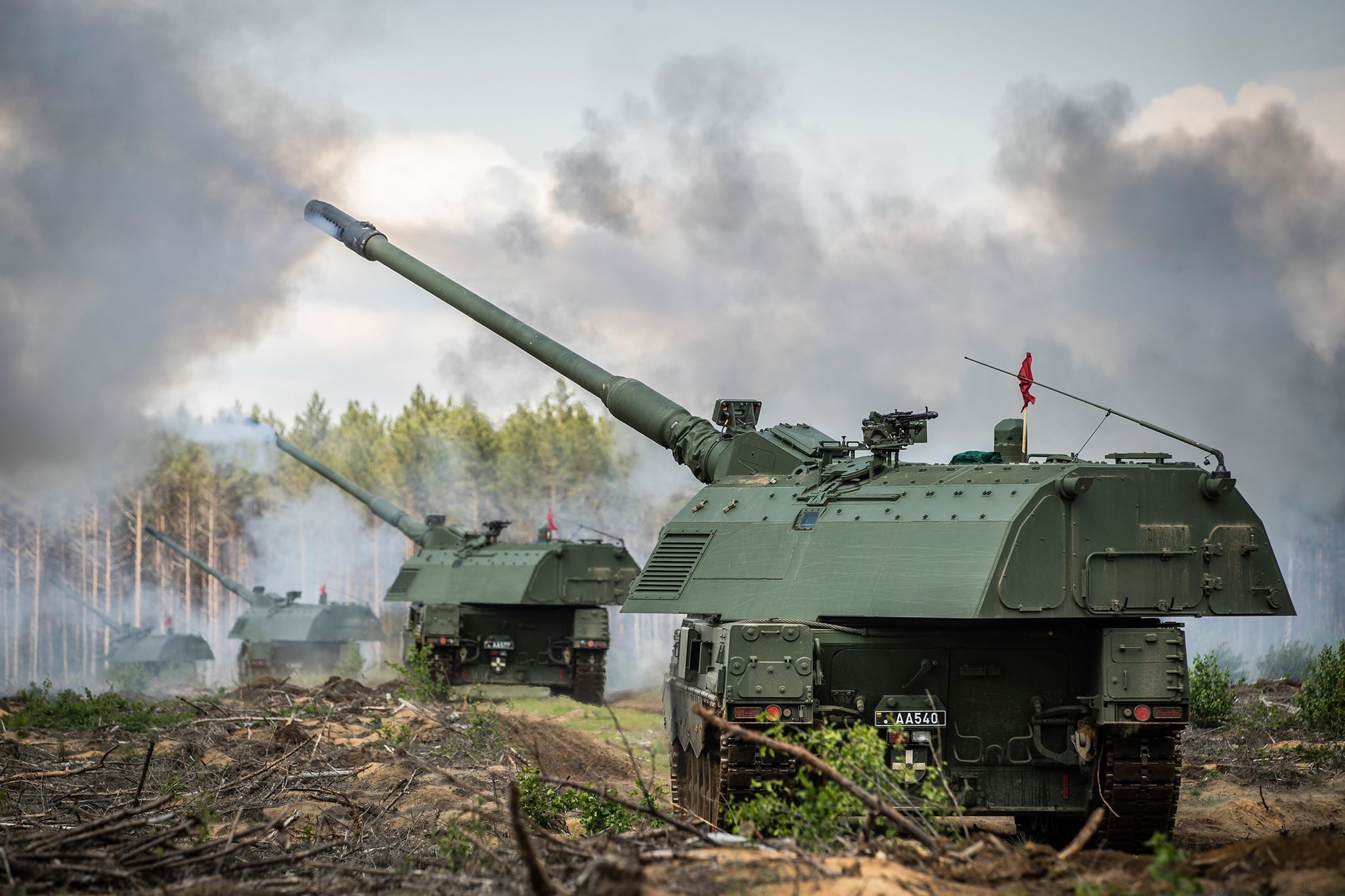
Lithuanian PzH 2000 battery of General Romualdas Giedraitis Artillery Battalion during an exercise

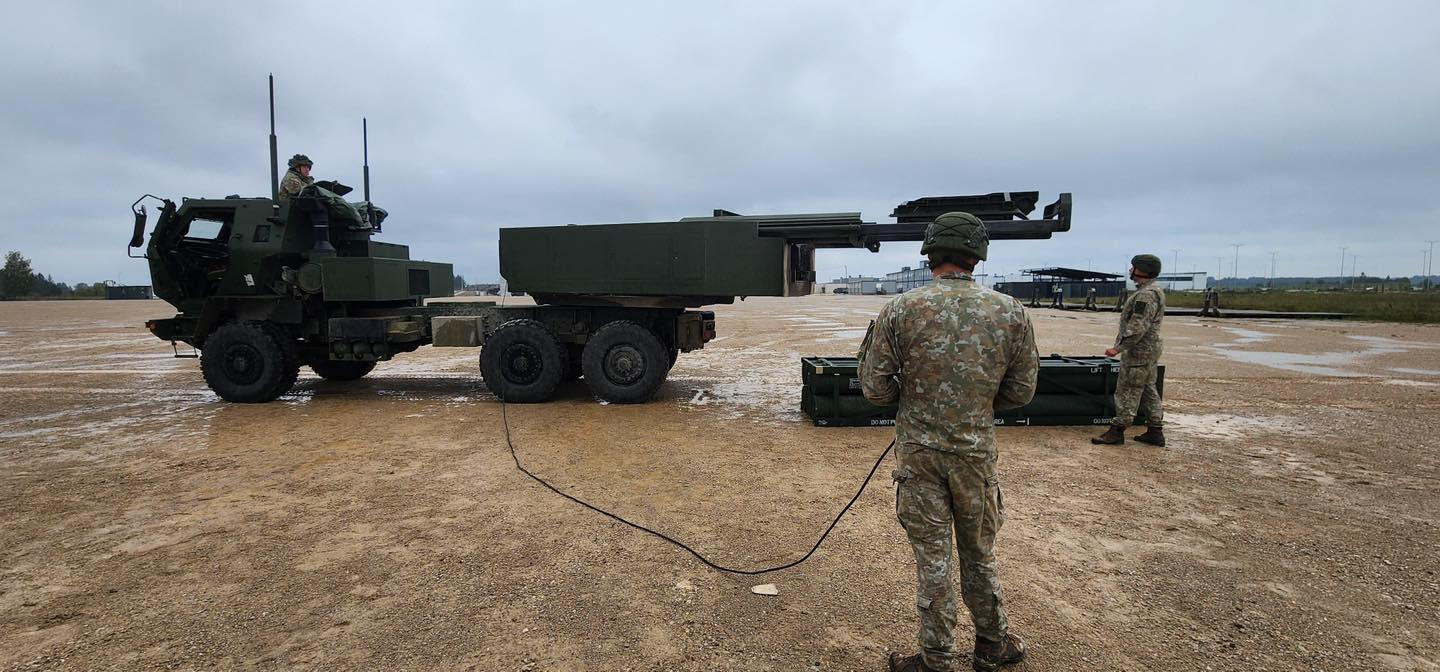
1st Division HIMARS battery during Operation „Baltic Alliance“

The Lithuanian Land forces use equipment compatible with NATO standards. Since 2007, the standard assault rifle is the German Heckler & Koch G36. Units are supplied with modern variants of anti-tank weapons (M72 LAW, Carl Gustaf, AT4, FGM-148 Javelin) as well as man-portable air-defense systems (PZR Grom, PPZR Piorun, RBS-70). Modern armoured equipment includes: Oshkosh L-ATV armoured cars, Boxer infantry fighting vehicles (local designation IVF "Vilkas") armed with Spike-LR anti-tank missiles and PzH 2000 self-propelled howitzers. Lithuanian Land forces have carried out major modernization and acquired more new weapons and heavier armour.

Lithuania has been restructuring its armed forces so that one-tenth of the Land Forces could at any given time be deployed for international operations, while half of the Land Forces would be prepared to deploy outside Lithuania's borders. The volunteers have already successfully participated in international operations in the Balkans, Afghanistan and Iraq.

=== Air Force ===
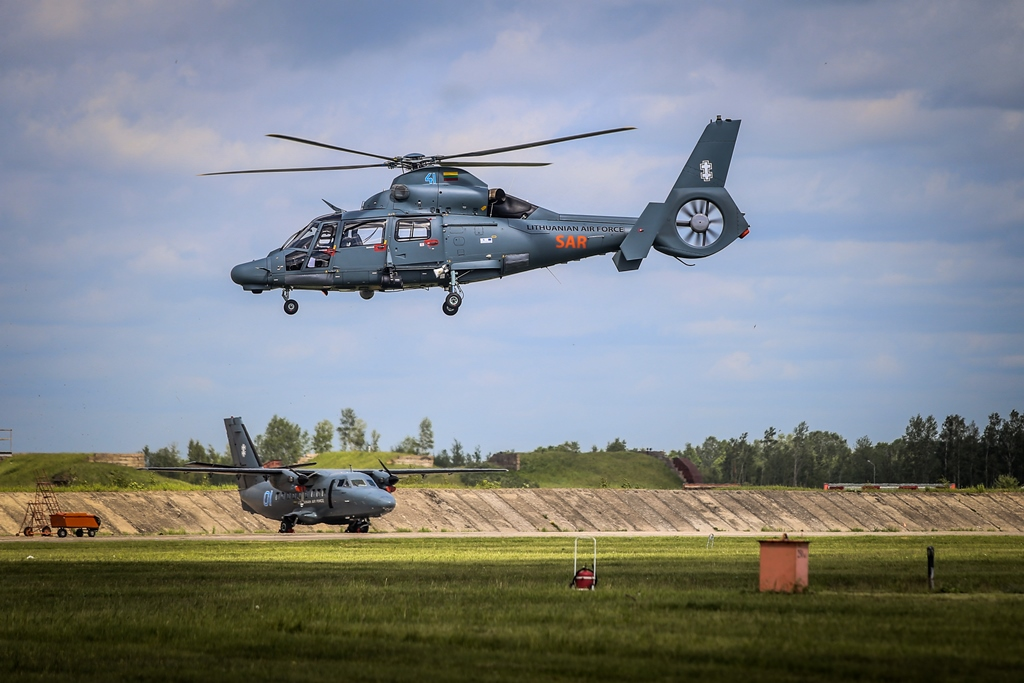
Lithuanian Air Force Zokniai Air Base.

The Lithuanian Air Force (LAF) is an integral part of the Lithuanian Armed Forces. The LAF is formed by professional military servicemen and non-military personnel. Units are located at various bases across Lithuania:

- Kaunas (Headquarters and the Airspace Surveillance and Control Command);
- Karmėlava (Air Space Control Centre);
- Nemirseta (providing basing for sea search and rescue detachment);
- Šiauliai (Zokniai Air Base, Air Force Armament and Equipment Repair Depot);
- Radviliškis (1st Air Defence Battalion).

The initial formation of the LAF was the 2nd transport squadron with the transfer of 20 An-2 aircraft from civilian to military use, with initial basing at the Barysiai Airport on 27 April 1992. These were joined by four L-39C Albatros aircraft to be used by the 1st fighter (training) squadron. These were in addition to Mil Mi-8 helicopters and a short-range transport aircraft L-410, all of which went through a capital overhaul, upgrade and modernisation in the 2000s.

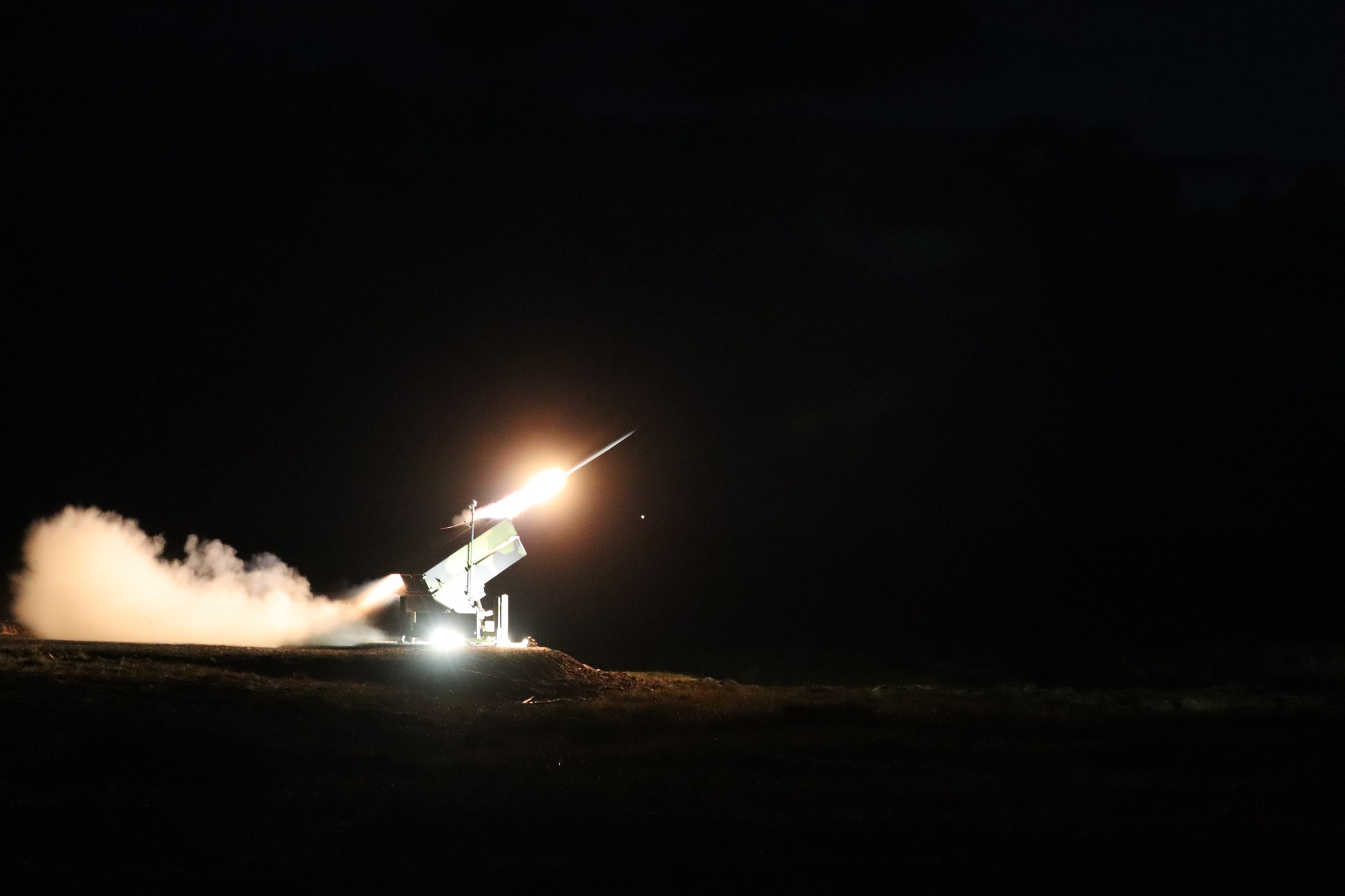
Lithuanian Air Force Air Defence Battalion NASAMS battery during "Joint Silver Arrow 2023" exercise.

Following the initial acquisitions, the LAF began its aircraft's modernisation by ordering three C-27J Spartan transporters in 2006. In 2013, three Eurocopter AS365 Dauphin helicopters were acquired from France and, in 2020, Lithuania announced an order or four Sikorsky UH-60 Black Hawk helicopters from the USA. Simultaneously, new medium-range and long-range radars were acquired for the Airspace Surveillance and Control Command.

Air space is patrolled by jet fighters from other NATO members and they are based in Zokniai Air Base, near the city of Šiauliai (see Baltic Air Policing). The external border of the European Union (with Kaliningrad and Belarus) is patrolled by the Aviation Unit of the Lithuanian State Border Guard Service which, since the 2000s, uses helicopters EC-120, EC-135 and EC-145.

=== Navy ===
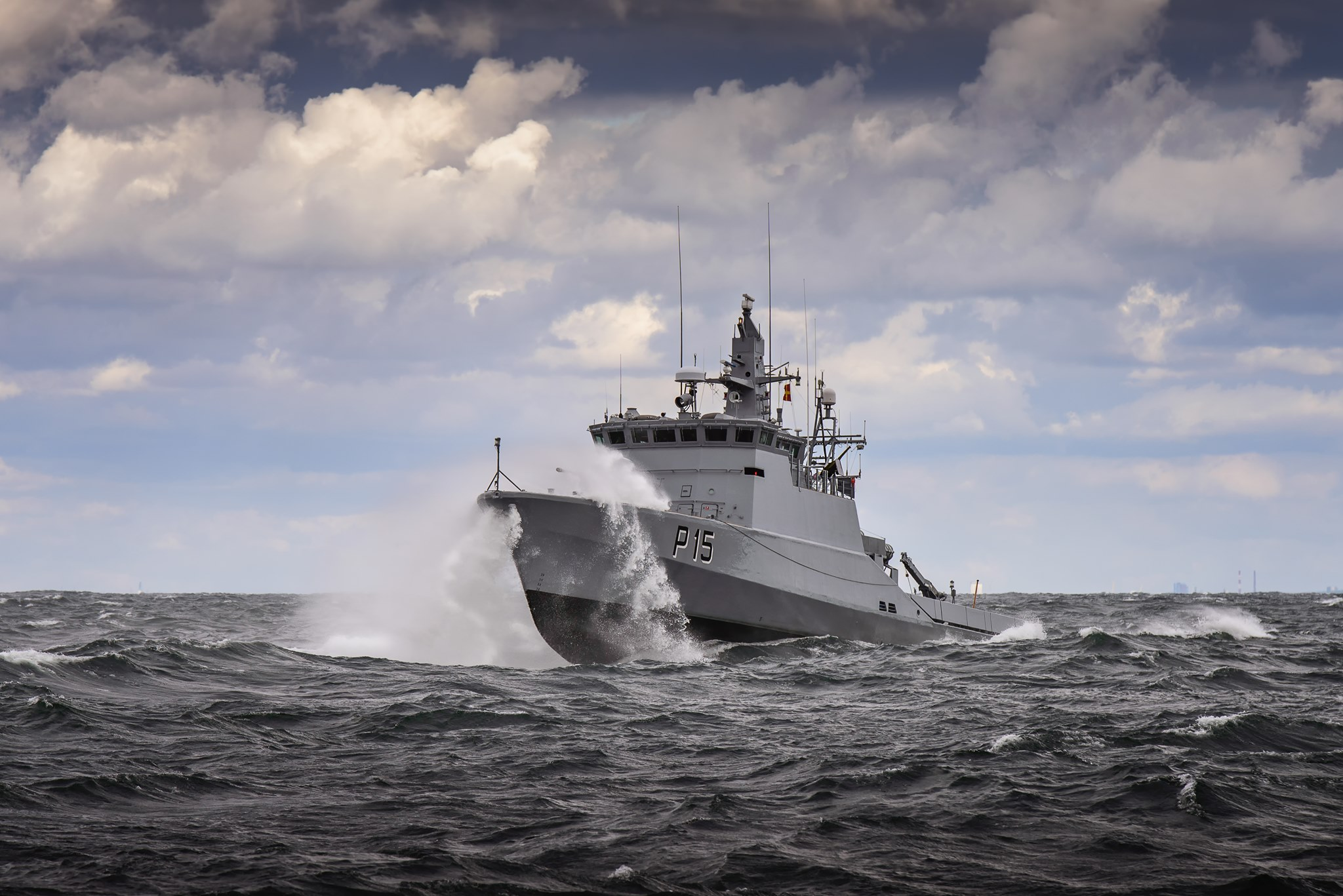
Lithuanian Naval Forces Flyvefisken-class ship Sėlis

The Navy consists of the Warship Flotilla, the Sea Coastal Surveillance System, the Naval Logistic Service, Training Center and Maritime Rescue Coordination Center. The flotilla is the core component of the Navy and consists of the Mine Countermeasures Squadron, the Patrol Ships Squadron, and the Harbour Boats Group. The current Commander in Chief of the Lithuanian Navy is Flotilla Admiral Giedrius Premeneckas.

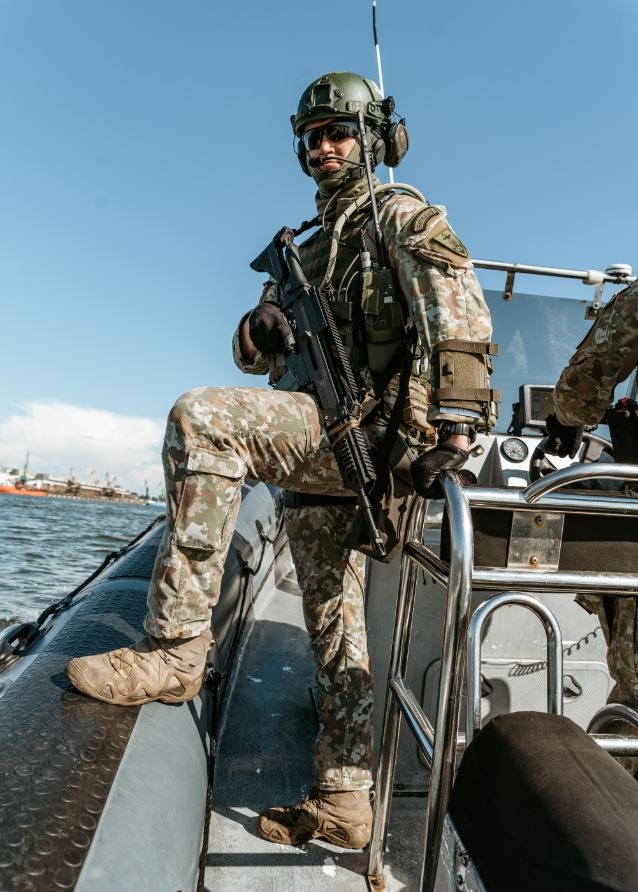
Marine fusiliers Boarding team

The Naval base and Headquarters are located in the city of Klaipėda. The Navy uses patrol ships for coastal surveillance. The four newly acquired Flyvefisken-class patrol vessels replaced the older Storm-class patrol boats and Grisha-class corvettes.

==== Marine fusiliers ====
From 1 August 2022, in order to eliminate the coastal and port defense gap and perform other functions assigned to the marines, the Naval Forces Port and Coastal Defense Service was established and partially formed by merging the Explosive Ordnance Disposal (EOD) Divers Team and the Naval Forces Logistics Service Security Company into one structure, which includes two infantry (fusilier) companies. In the process of forming the unit's traditions, the soldiers serving in the unit began to be called marine fusiliers (marine infantry), and the service itself is unofficially called the Fusilier Battalion.

In April 2025, the Navy announced that the marine unit would be officially renamed the General Kazimieras Nestoras Sapiega Fusiliers Battalion and would continue the traditions of the 7th Fusiliers Regiment.

=== Special Operations Forces ===
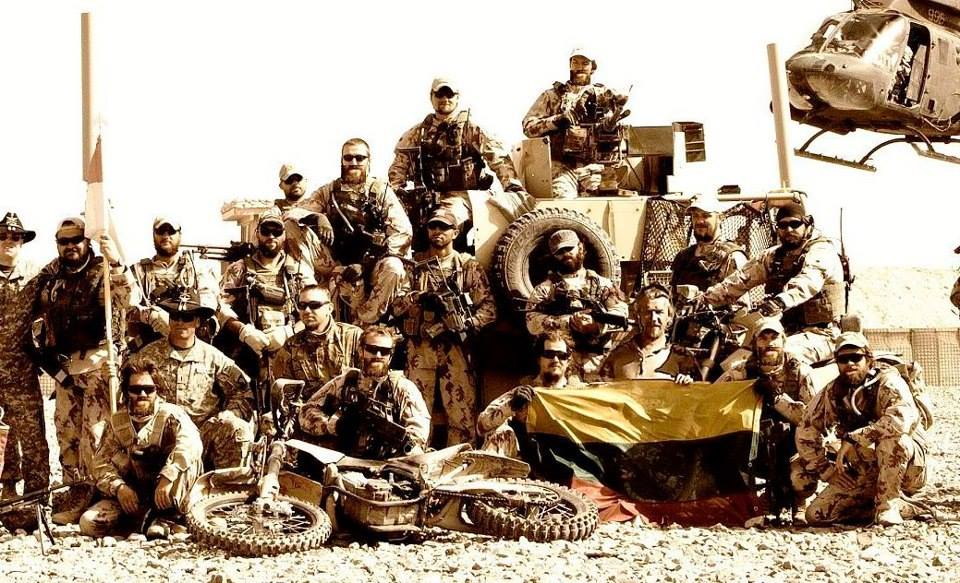
Lithuanian Special Forces squadron Aitvaras deployed in Afghanistan.

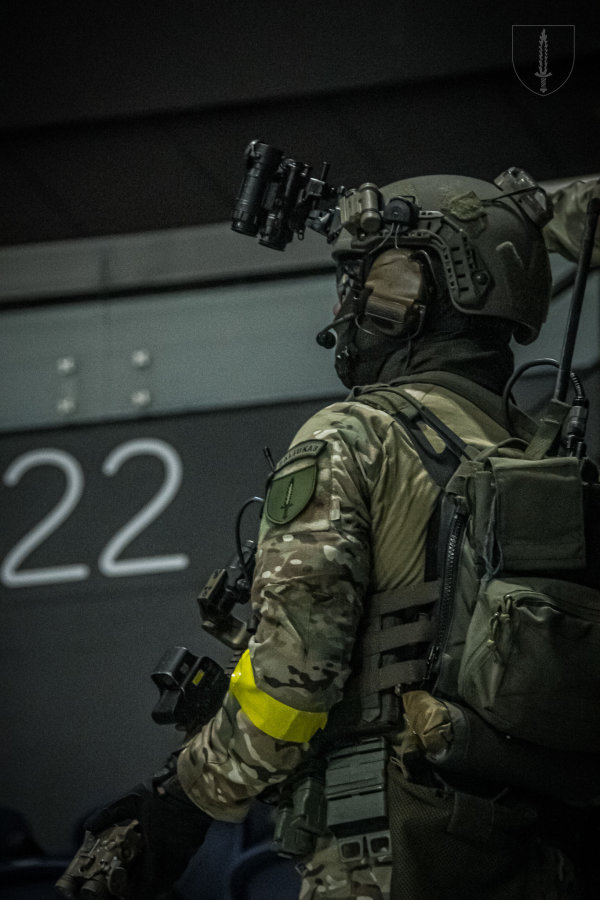
Special Purpose Unit (YPT) operator during joint counter-terrorism exercise with ARAS.

The Lithuanian Special Operations Forces of Lithuanian Armed Forces have been in operation de facto since 2002 and it were established de jure on 3 April 2008, when amendments of National Defence System organisation and military service law came into force.

The Special Operations Forces are responsible for special reconnaissance, direct actions, and military support. They have also in charge of other tasks, e.g., protection of VIPs in peacetime. They are formed by the Special Purpose Service, Vytautas the Great Jaeger Battalion and Combat Divers Service. The Special Operations Forces organization is flexible, which makes it easy to form squadrons intended for specific operations and missions. The Special Operations Forces can be called upon inside the territory of Lithuania when law enforcement agencies lack or do not have the necessary capabilities to react to terrorist attacks.

The Special Operations Forces Squadron "Aitvaras" was deployed to Afghanistan for Operation Enduring Freedom. From 2005 to 2006 its squadrons were on standby as part of the NATO Response Force.

== International cooperation ==
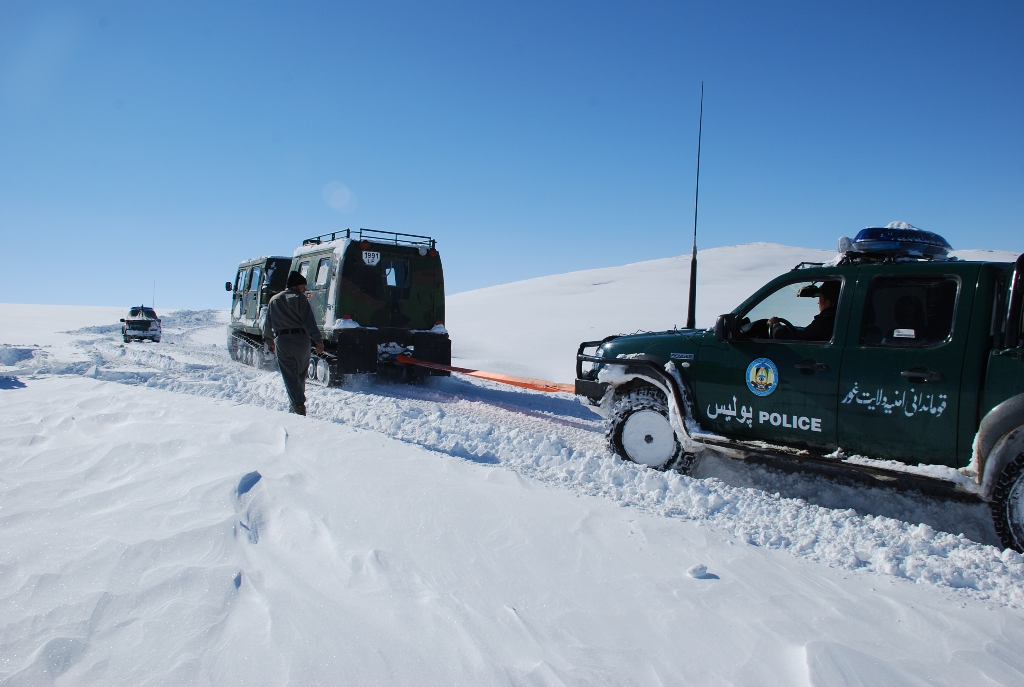
Lithuanian Bandvagn 206 helping an Afghan National Police vehicle in the snow

Lithuania has been a member of NATO military alliance since 2004. In the European Union, Lithuanian Armed Forces have also taken part in the Nordic Battle Group since 2008. Lithuanian Armed Forces also participate in the Joint Expeditionary Force formed in 2014.

In 2009, to encourage regional cooperation, Lithuania joined the initiative to form the Lithuanian–Polish–Ukrainian Brigade.

=== NATO membership ===
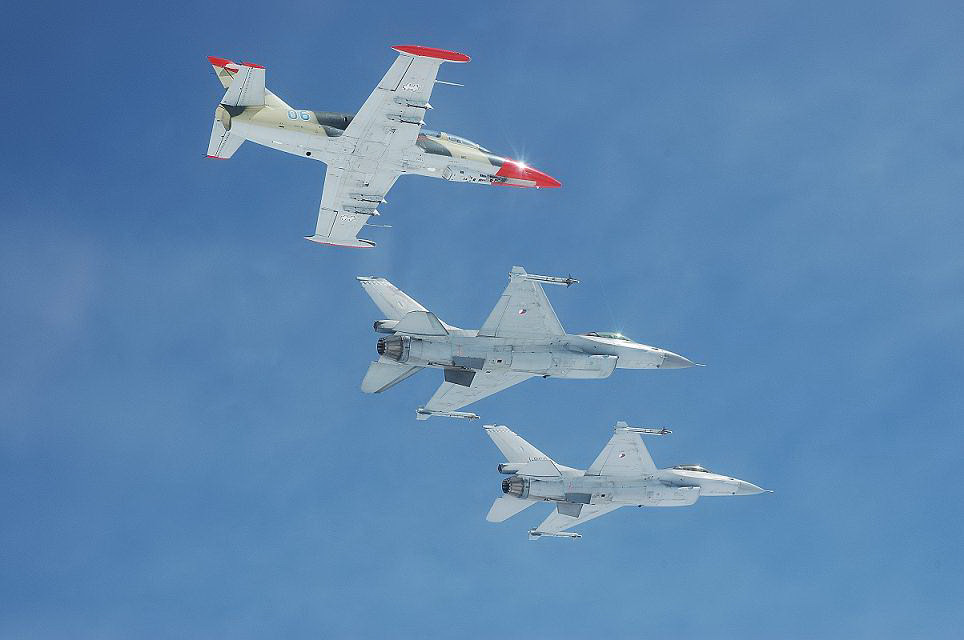
Lithuanian Air Force L-39ZA with two Royal Netherlands Air Force F-16AM Fighting Falcon

Soon after the restoration of independence, Lithuania applied for NATO membership in January 1994. Together with another six Central and Eastern European countries, Lithuania was invited to join the North Atlantic Treaty Organization in the 2002 Prague summit and became a member of the Alliance in March 2004. Lithuania entered NATO on full-fledged rights immediately after the procedures of joining the North Atlantic Treaty were completed and acquired rights to participate in the political decision-making process of the Alliance. Integration into the military structures of NATO became a long-term task of the Lithuanian Armed Forces. Mechanised Infantry Brigade "Iron Wolf" was affiliated to the Danish Division based on agreements signed by Denmark and Lithuania in August 2006. Lithuanian Armed Forces started to boost the Brigade's ability to cooperate with the forces of other NATO members.

==== NATO operations and deployments in Baltics and Lithuania ====
Baltic Air Policing was established by NATO allies since Lithuania and the other Baltic states do not have capabilities to secure their airspace. Fighter jets of NATO members are permanently deployed in Zokniai airport near the city Šiauliai to provide cover for the Baltic states airspace. In 2013, NATO Energy Security Centre of Excellence was established in Vilnius.

Following the 2016 Warsaw summit, NATO Enhanced Forward Presence was deployed in the Baltic States with the multinational battalion battle group in Lithuania being led by Germany.

=== Cooperation between the Baltic States ===
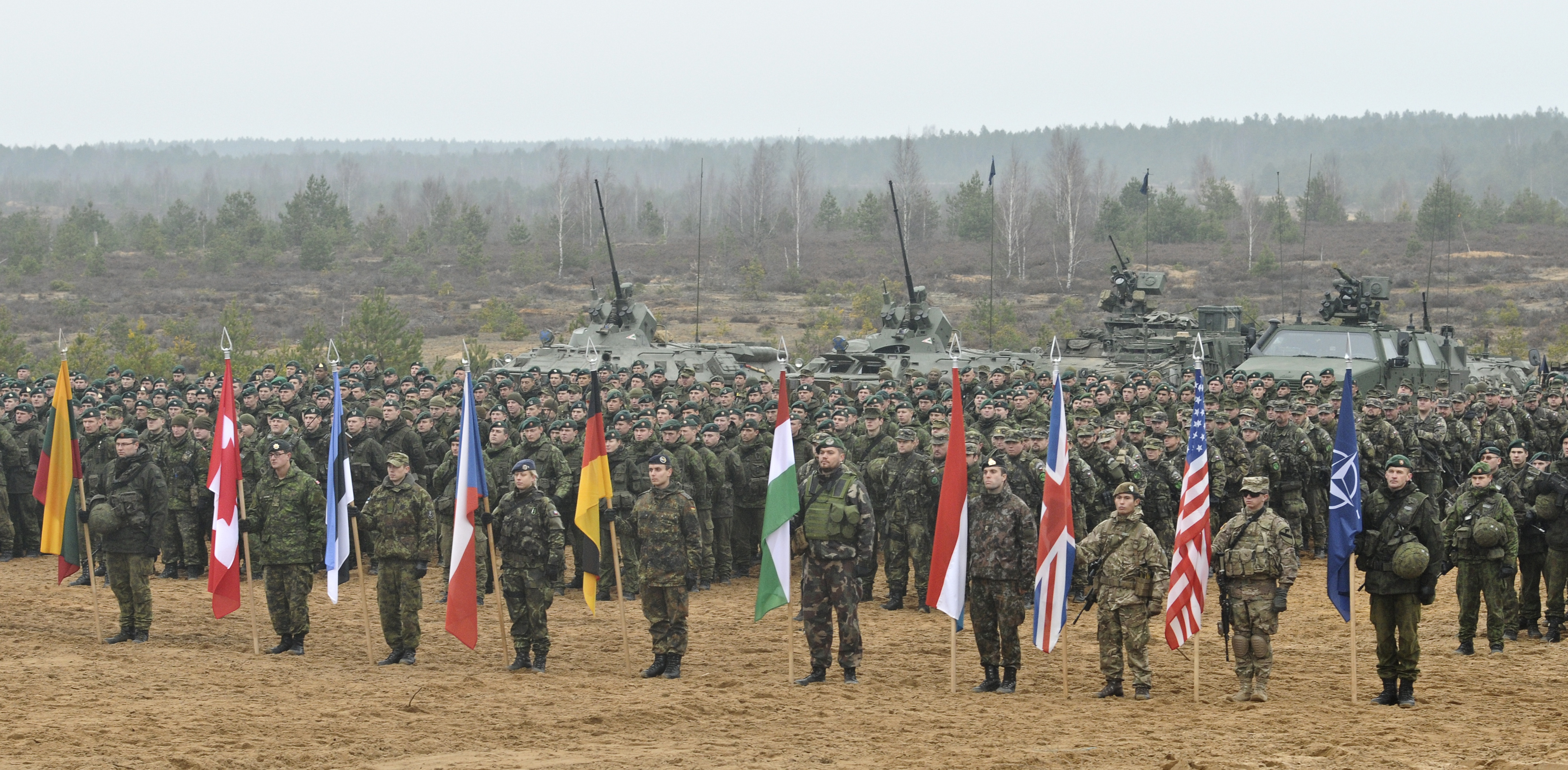
Lithuanian soldiers with their NATO allies during Iron Sword 2014.

Lithuania also cooperates with the two other Baltic states – Latvia and Estonia in several trilateral Baltic defence co-operation initiatives:

- Baltic Battalion (BALTBAT) – infantry battalion for participation in international peace support operations, headquartered near Riga, Latvia;
- Baltic Naval Squadron (BALTRON) – naval force with mine countermeasures capabilities, headquartered near Tallinn, Estonia;
- Baltic Air Surveillance Network (BALTNET) – air surveillance information system, headquartered near Kaunas, Lithuania;
- Joint military educational institutions: Baltic Defence College (BALTDEFCOL) in Tartu, Estonia, Baltic Diving Training Centre in Liepāja, Latvia and Baltic Naval Communications Training Centre in Tallinn, Estonia.
- Baltic Defense Line – defensive fortication line along the borders of Baltic countries and Russia/Belarus.

In January 2011, the Baltic states were invited to join Nordic Defence Cooperation, the defence framework of the Nordic countries. In November 2012, the three countries agreed to create a joint military staff in 2013. Future co-operation will include sharing of national infrastructures for training purposes and specialisation of training areas (BALTTRAIN) and collective formation of battalion-sized contingents for use in the NATO rapid-response force.

=== Foreign missions and operations ===
Lithuanian soldiers have taken part in international operations since 1993. From the summer of 2005 until 2014, Lithuania has been part of the International Security Assistance Force in Afghanistan (ISAF), leading a Provincial Reconstruction Team (PRT) in the town of Chaghcharan in the province of Ghor. The PRT included personnel from Denmark, Iceland and the US. There have also been special operation forces units in Afghanistan. They were placed in Kandahar province.

Since joining international operations in 1993, Lithuania has lost two soldiers. 1st Lt. Normundas Valteris fell in Bosnia (17 April 1996), Sgt. Arūnas Jarmalavičius in Afghanistan (22 May 2008).

=== Current operations (in 2022) ===
Deployment	Organization	Operation	Personnel
Central African Republic	EU	EUTM RCA	2
Iraq	NATO	NATO Mission Iraq	2
Mali	EU	EUTM Mali	2
Mali	UN	MINUSMA	45
Kosovo	NATO	KFOR	1
Ukraine		JMTG-U	30

== List of military equipment ==
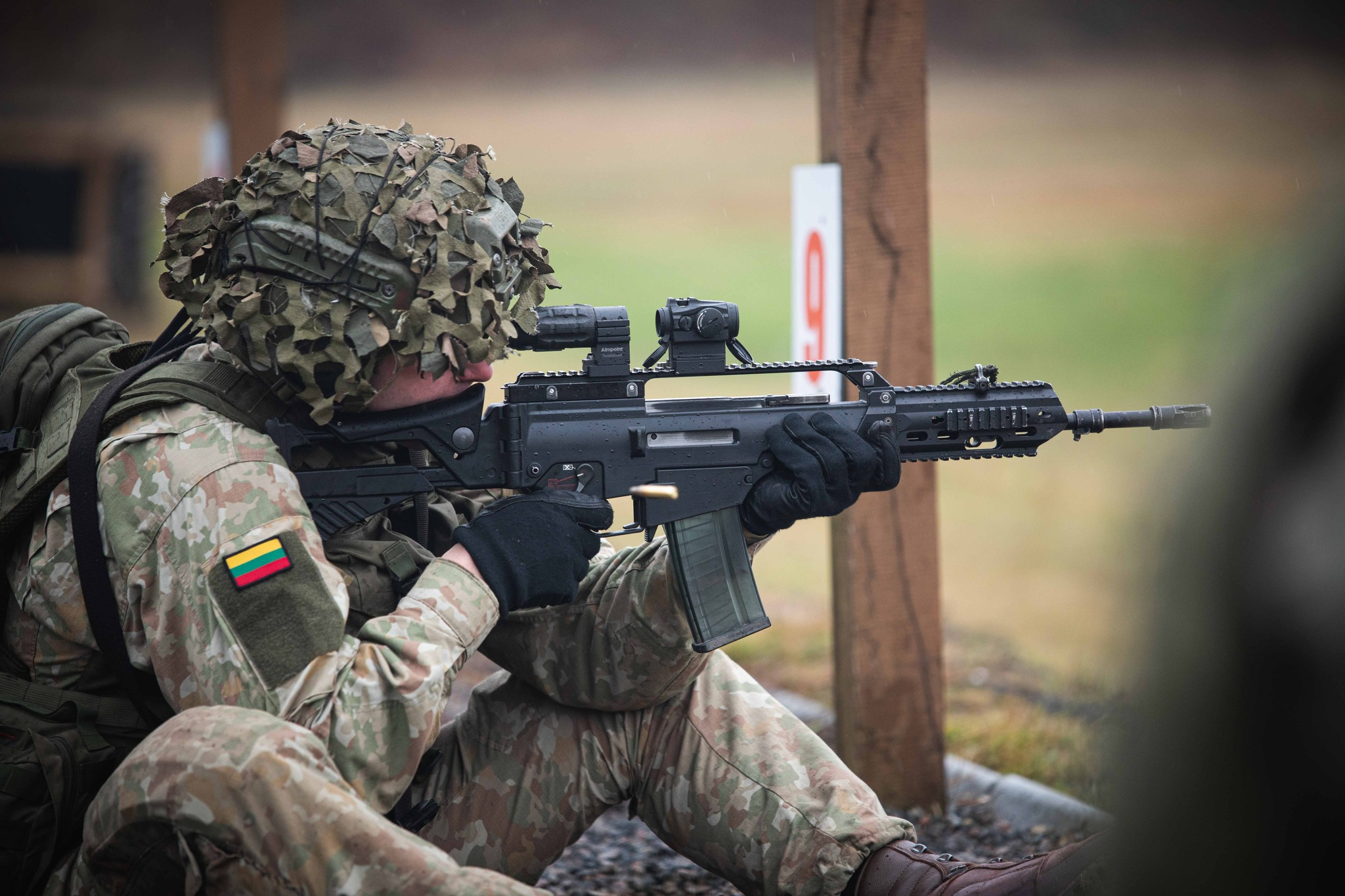
Heckler & Koch G36

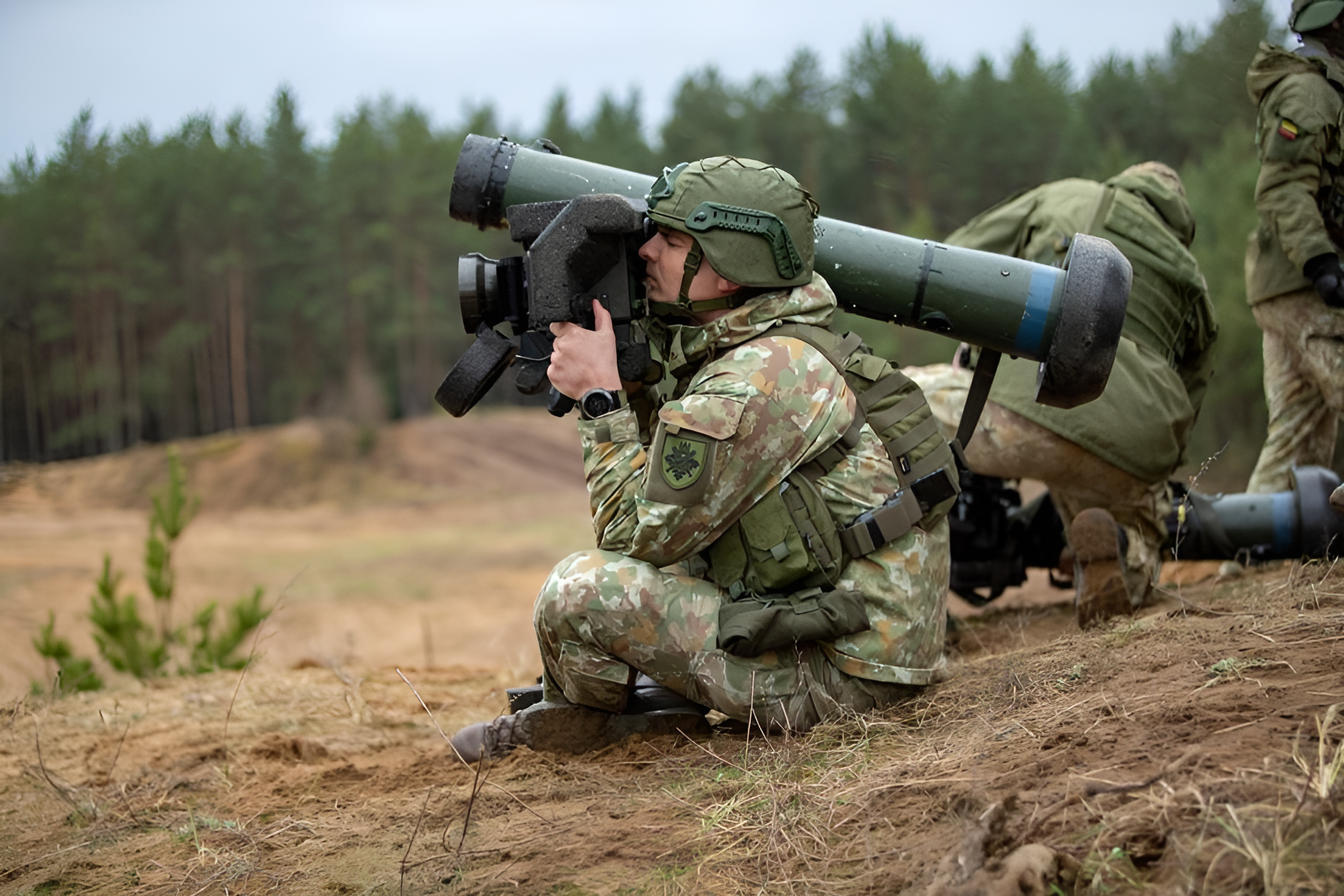
FGM-148 Javelin

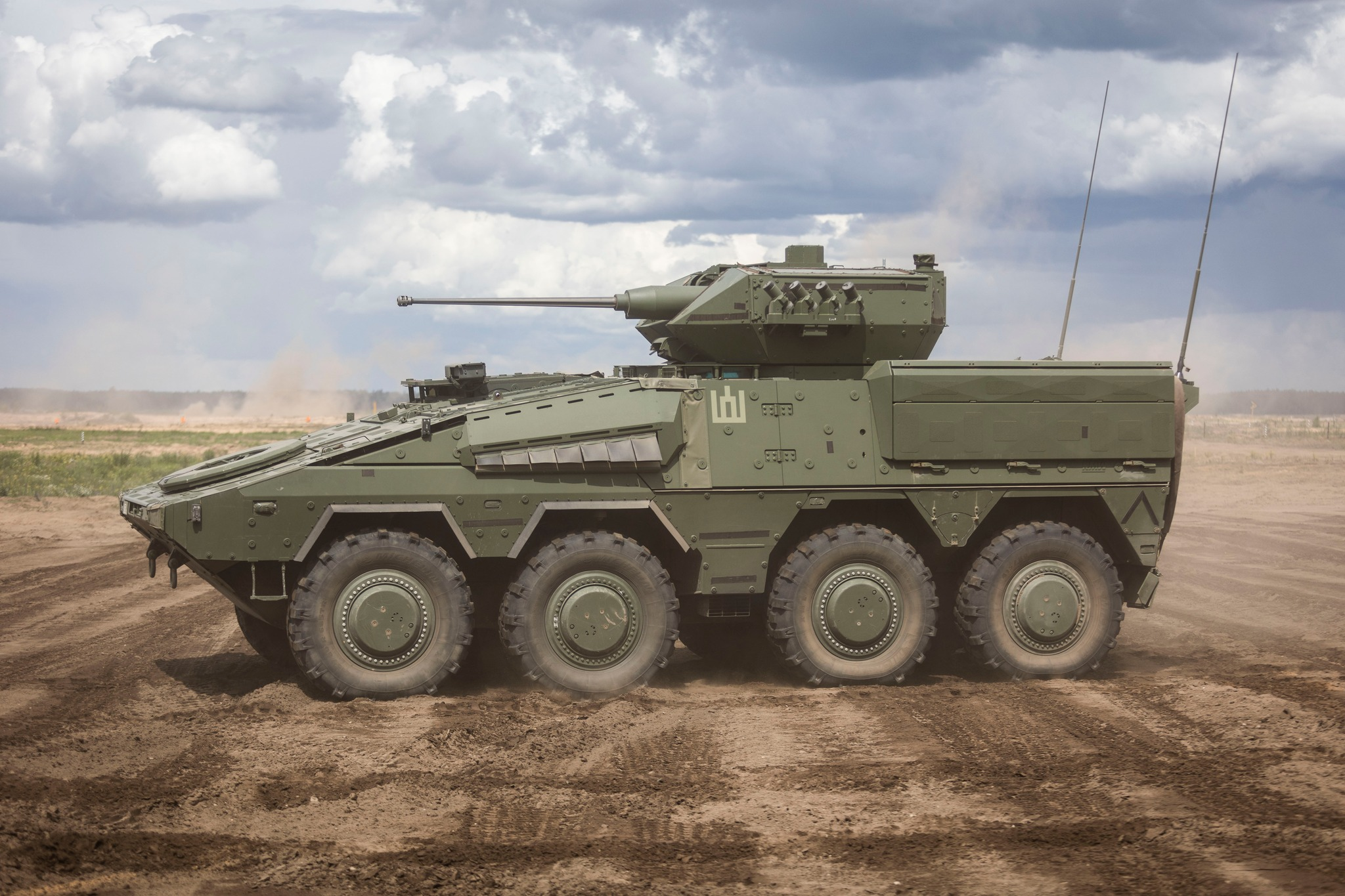
IFV Vilkas

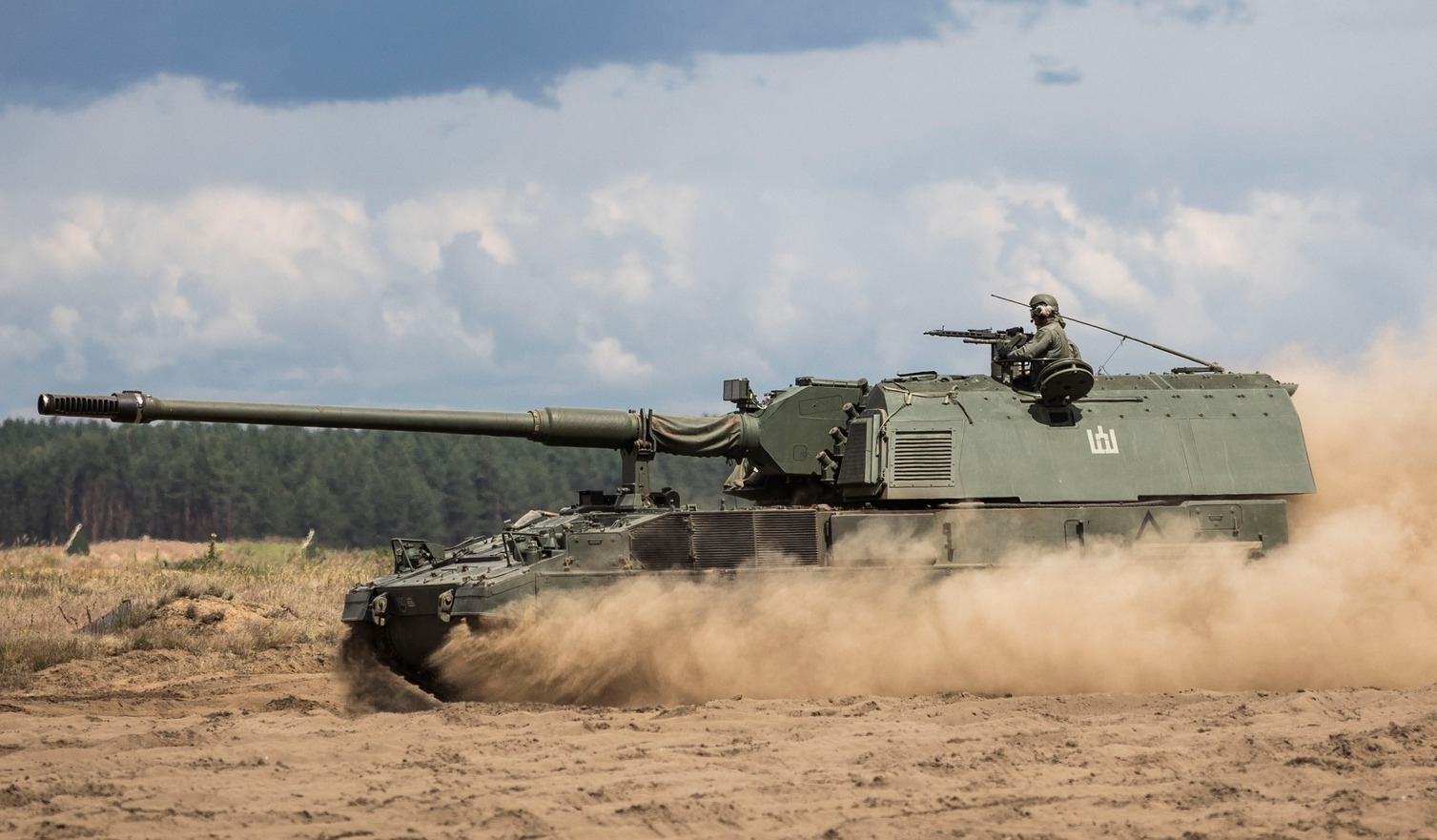
PzH 2000

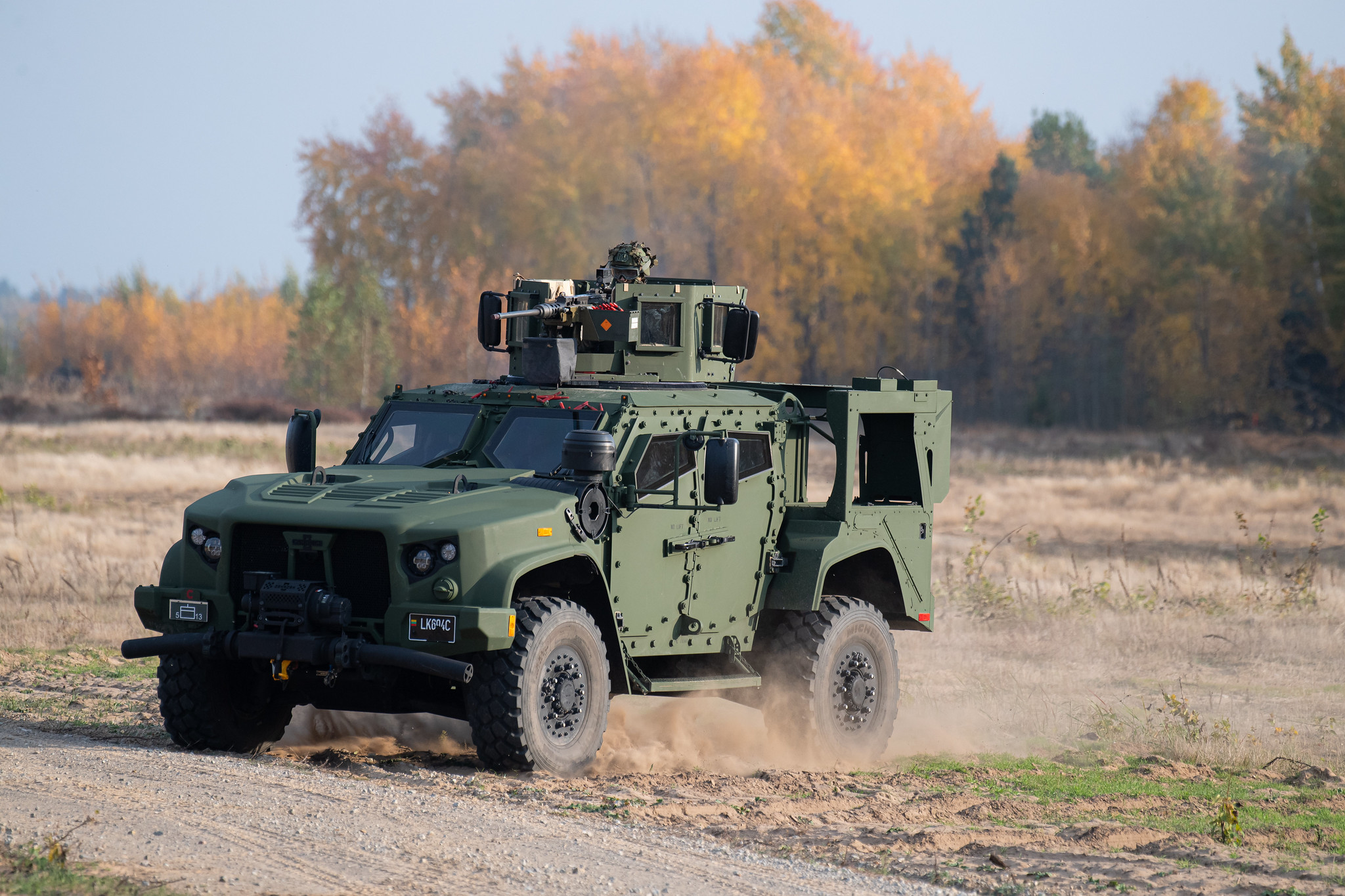
JLTV

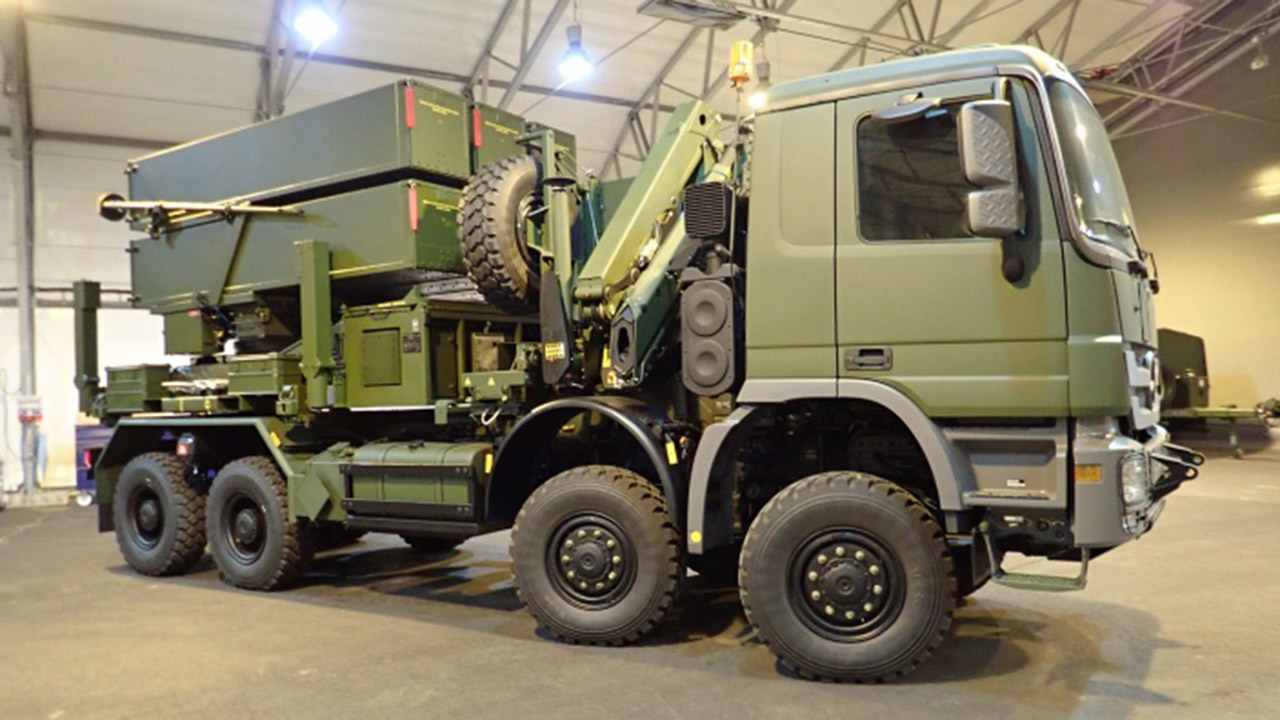
NASAMS 3

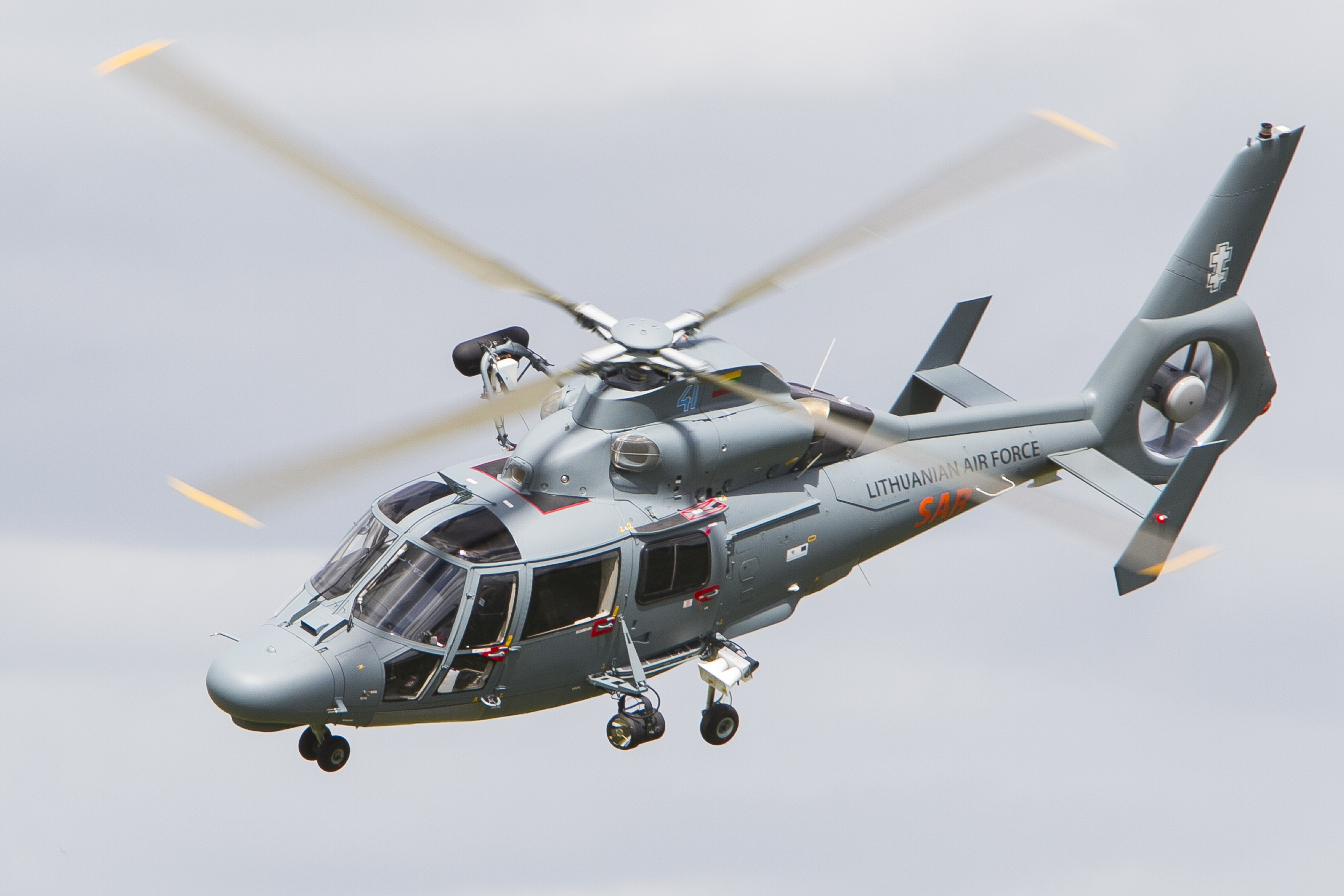
Eurocopter AS365 Dauphin

== Military industry ==
After the 2022 Russian invasion of Ukraine, Lithuania has sought to develop its military industrial base.

Lithuania has an ammunition producer, AB Giraitė Ammunition Plant (small caliber ammunition). Lithuania also has a state-owned explosives manufacturer, Detonas, that is aiming to start producing military explosives (RDX, PETN, HMX).

Lithuania has made a contract with the company Rheinmetall about establishing an artillery ammunition and artillery charge (gunpowder) production plant in Lithuania. The building of the plant started in November 2025. Also a conctract with Northrop Grumman and Nammo for production of medium-calibre (30mm) ammunition in Lithuania has been signed. Also new armored fighting vehicle assembly and maintenance facilities have been set up. Lithuania has also developed its drone industry.

== See also ==
- Equipment of the Lithuanian Land Force
- Baltic Air Policing
- NATO Enhanced Forward Presence

== Notes ==
a. The 23,000 is structured like this: 14,500 in the Army, 1,500 in the Air Force, 700 in the Navy, and 6,300 in other units. The other units includes the Logistics Support Command (1,400), Training and Doctrine Command (1,500), the Special Operations Force (unknown) as well as the battalions of HQ and Military Police (2,600).

b. The paramilitary includes 10,600 of the Riflemen's Union and 3,550 of the State Border Guard Service.

c. The number of 1.05 billion is without including military pensions. When the military pensions are included, the military budget reaches 1.12 billion.

== Bibliography ==
- Čepinskytė, Agnė (6 June 2016). "Lithuania Reinstates Conscription: Implications on Security, National Identity, and Gender Roles". Foreign Policy Research Institute. Archived from the original on 16 May 2022.
- Hackett, James, ed. (14 February 2022). "The 2022 Military Balance Chart". The Military Balance. 122 (1). International Institute for Strategic Studies. ISSN 0459-7222.
- Sytas, Andrius (23 June 2022). "Lithuania president eyes hike in defence spending to host more NATO troops". Vilnius. Reuters. Archived from the original on 25 June 2022.
- Vaičenonis, Jonas (2002). "Lietuvos kariuomenės skaičiai 1920–1939 m." (PDF). Karo Archyvas (in Lithuanian). 17. Vilnius. Archived from the original (PDF) on 15 December 2022.
