= Lithuanian Military Police =

Military law enforcement agency of the Republic of Lithuania

- Lietuvos karo policija
- Insignia
- Active: 1919–1940, 1998–present
- Country: Lithuania
- Branch: Military police
- Type: Agency
- Role: Law-enforcement
- Part of: Lithuanian Armed Forces
- Garrison/HQ: Vilnius
- Website: Link

Commanders
- Current commander: Lieutenant Colonel Laimas Baliūnas
- Chief of Staff: Major Darius Bartaševičius
- Command Sergeant Major: Senior Warrant Officer Arūnas Daublys

Insignia
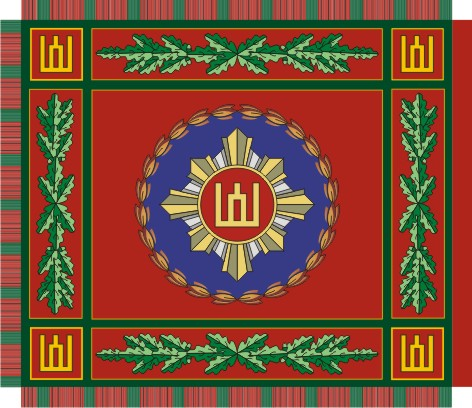
- Flag

The Lithuanian Military Police (Lithuanian: Lietuvos karo policija) is a law enforcement agency operating within the national defence system of the Republic of Lithuania and is a part of the Lithuanian Armed Forces. Military Police are directly subordinate to the Chief of Defence of the Republic of Lithuania. Main tasks of Military Police include preventing of crimes and other breaches of legal acts, investigating and disclosing offences, enforcing law and order in military territories and in the armed forces and ensuring the security of military traffic.

== History ==
15 March 1919 is the date of establishment of the Military Police of the Lithuanian Armed Forces, when the Kaunas Military Commandant organized a company of Kaunas militia with the purpose of which was to help maintain order in the city and the county. On 15 March 1919, Jonas Jočys, an officer, was appointed Commander of the Company, and Jonas Šalkauskas, his assistant. There were 60 soldiers assigned to the Military Field Military Company. The Military Police of the Lithuanian Armed Forces was reestablished in 22 October 1998. On 22 October 1998 in the Parliament of Lithuania the Military Police Law of the Lithuanian Armed Forces was adopted which served as a basis for the establishment of military police. In 1999 Major Dainius Janėnas was appointed as Commander of Military Police. In 2000 Vilnius and Kaunas Garrisons were established, and a year later, the Klaipėda Garrison was formed. In 2005, Šiauliai Garrison was also established. In 2004 Lt Col Sigitas Butkus was appointed as Commander of Military Police. On 22 October 2004, Military Police colours were adopted.

== Mission ==
The Military Police Law outlines the Military Police's competence, functions and tasks as well as organizational procedures, rights and responsibilities of military policemen and relationship with other law enforcement institutions. Functions of Military Police include:

- Implementation of measures to prevent crimes and other breaches of legal acts;
- Recording and control of crimes and other violations of legal acts;
- Investigation of committed crimes and other breaches of legal acts.

Keeping with procedures outlined in legislation Military Police carries out search of soldiers suspected or accused in crimes and violations of other legal acts, deserted or missing soldiers as well as pretrial investigations in cases that are in the competence of Military Police under the legislation on penal process, in cases stipulated in legislation, carries out the orders of interrogators, prosecutors, judges and courts. Military Police maintains military discipline and order by patrolling, security of military transport, escorting of military transport convoys, as well as guarding of key military objects, guardhouses.

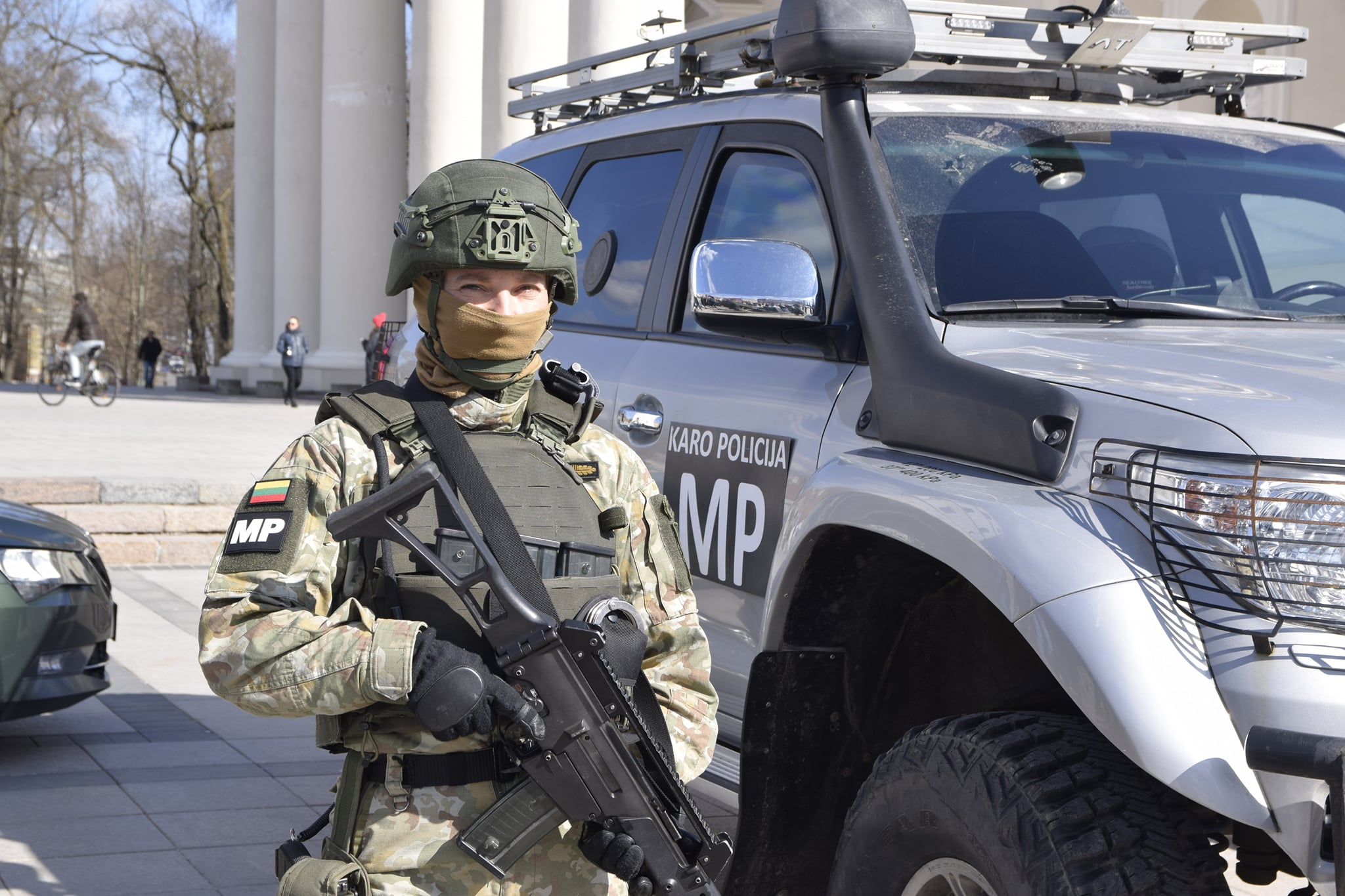
Military Police officer in combat gear

Military policemen participate in multinational operations and exercises. They already participated in international missions in Bosnia and Herzegovina, missions in Iraq, multinational exercises Amber Hope, Baltic Challenge, Baltic Eagle, Strong Resolve, Rescuer-Medceur, where they maintained security of military transport and public order. Any person serving in the National Defence System or having served in the compulsory military service, after passing an established selection process can be accepted to Military Police.

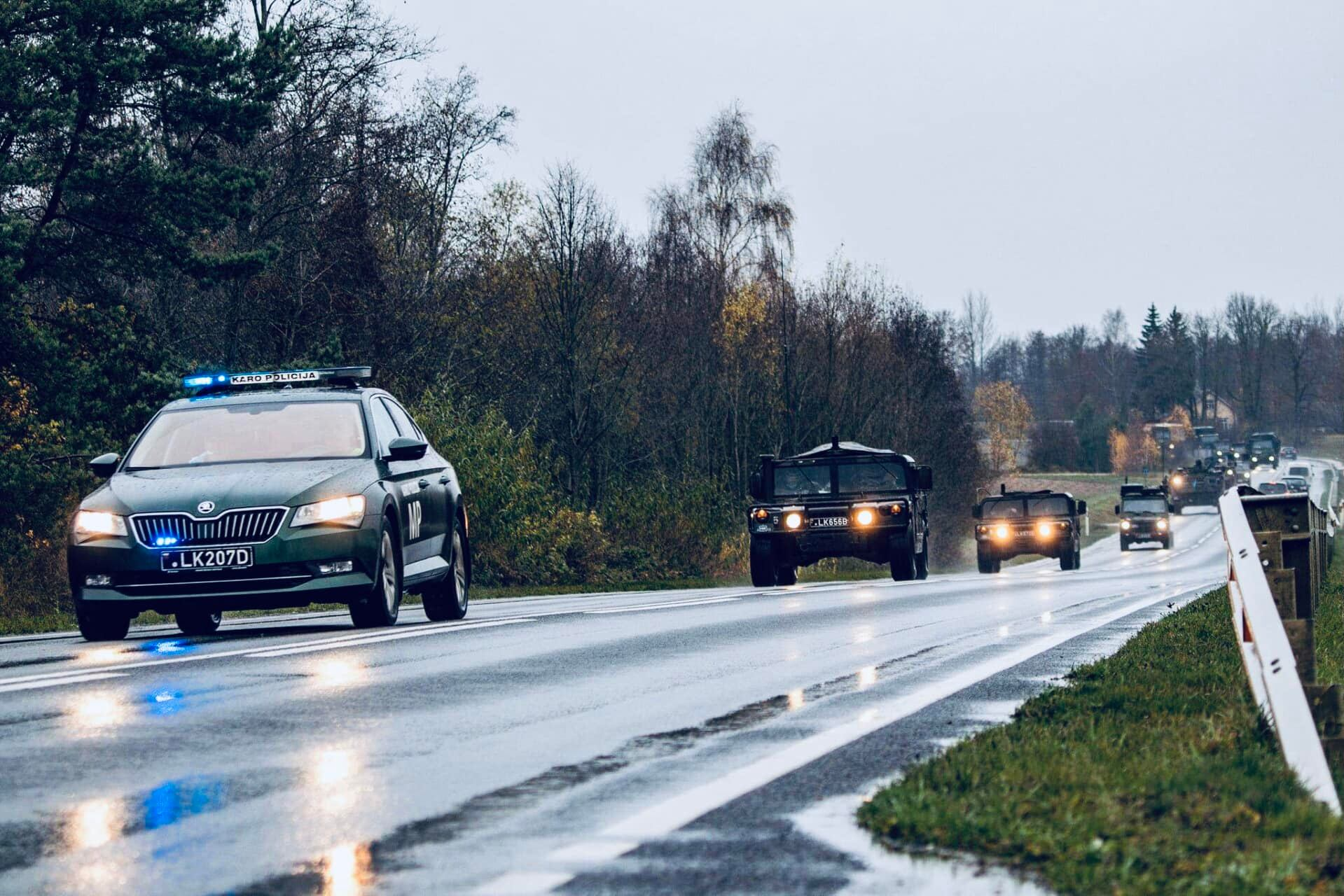
Military Police car escorting the convoy

== Units ==
Military Police carries out its functions in accordance with administrative division of the Republic of Lithuania:

- Military Police Staff;
- Pre-trial investigation;
- Vilnius Garrison - responsibilities include Vilnius and Utena districts;
- Kaunas Garrison - responsibilities include Kaunas, Marijampolė and Alytus districts;
- Klaipėda Garrison - responsibilities include Klaipėda, Tauragė and Telšiai districts;
- Šiauliai Garrison - responsibilities include Šiauliai and Panevėžys districts.
