= Vilnian National Guard =

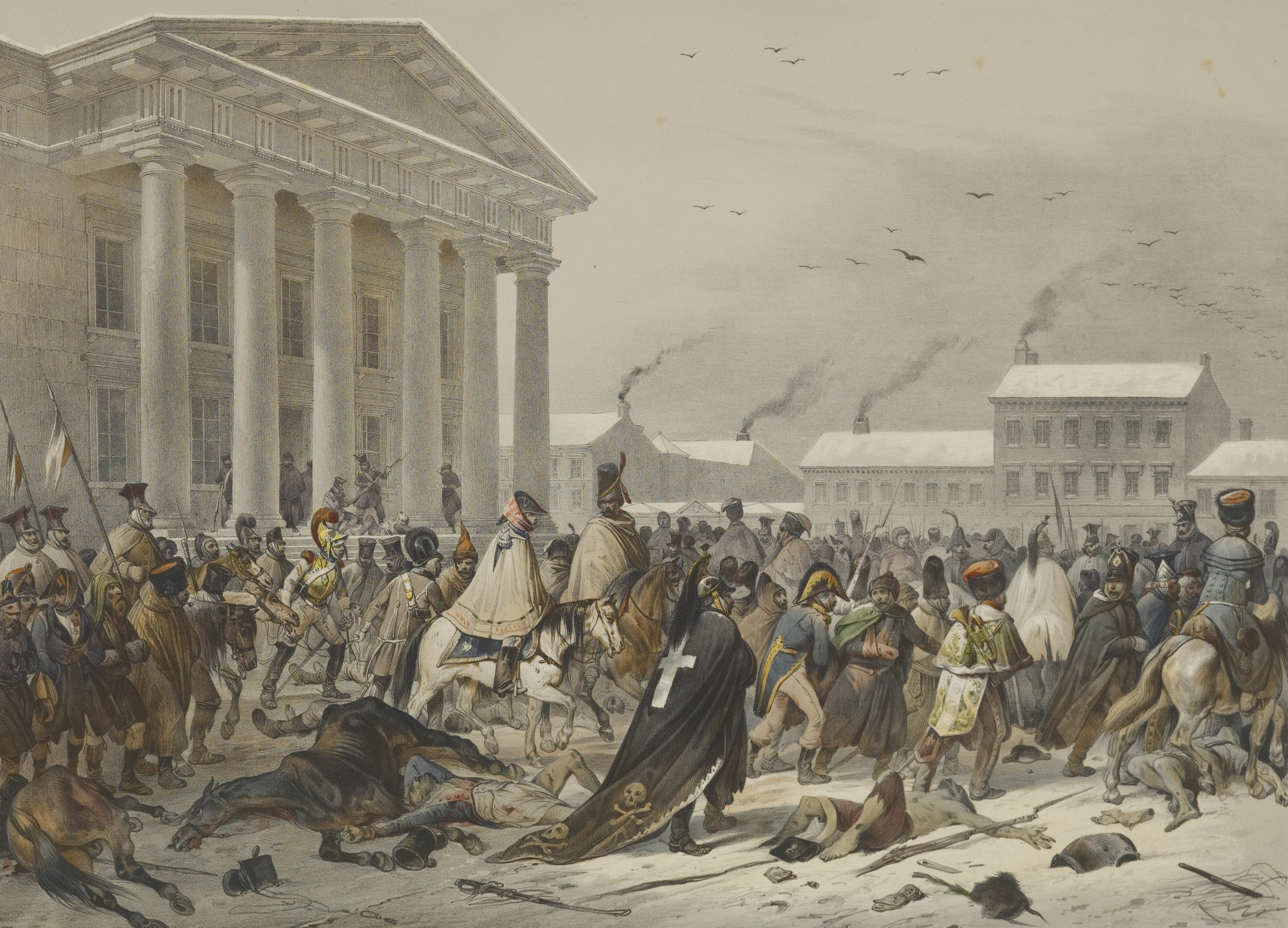
Retreating French army after the unsuccessful invasion of Russia in 1812 at the Town Hall of Vilnius

Vilnian National Guard (Polish: Gwardia Narodowa Wileńska) was a paramilitary unit formed in the city of Vilna (modern Vilnius, Lithuania) during the French invasion of Russia in 1812. Among the duties of the unit were maintaining law and order in the city, but also guarding state and military buildings. The Vilnian National Guard took part in the Battle of Vilna later that year, during Napoleon's retreat from Russia. Following the Russian take-over of the city the Guard was disbanded.

Already before the French invasion started, a large part of the former Grand Duchy of Lithuania revolted against the Russian Empire. Soon after his arrival to Vilna, Napoleon Bonaparte formed the Provisional Government of the Grand Duchy of Lithuania, promising to restore it to its former wealth. The new government instantly renewed the Polish–Lithuanian Union and agreed to form the forces of the popular uprising into regular army. On July 5, 1812, the irregulars were formed into three regiments of guards cavalry and five regiments of infantry.

In addition to the regular units, on July 1 an irregular unit of Vilnian burghers was formed in order to carry out police and safekeeping duties within the confines of the city. The unit, named Vilnian National Guard, or Gwardia Narodowa Wileńska in Polish, was composed of 2 battalions. In accordance with the rules for similar units formed in Warsaw, Minsk, Grodno and other towns, the membership was to be limited to all able-bodied men between 18 and 50 years of age, who possessed financial qualifications for the service (two thirds of all the recruits paid for their own equipment and uniform).

Following the renewal of the Polish–Lithuanian Union the command over the unit was passed to experienced Polish officers from the Duchy of Warsaw, often veterans of the Old Guard. The first commander of the newly formed unit was Colonel Kozielski. Among its officers was also Józef Deszczyński, a noted Polish composer and director of the epoch.
