= Walter NZ 40 =

1920s Czech piston aircraft engine

NZ 40
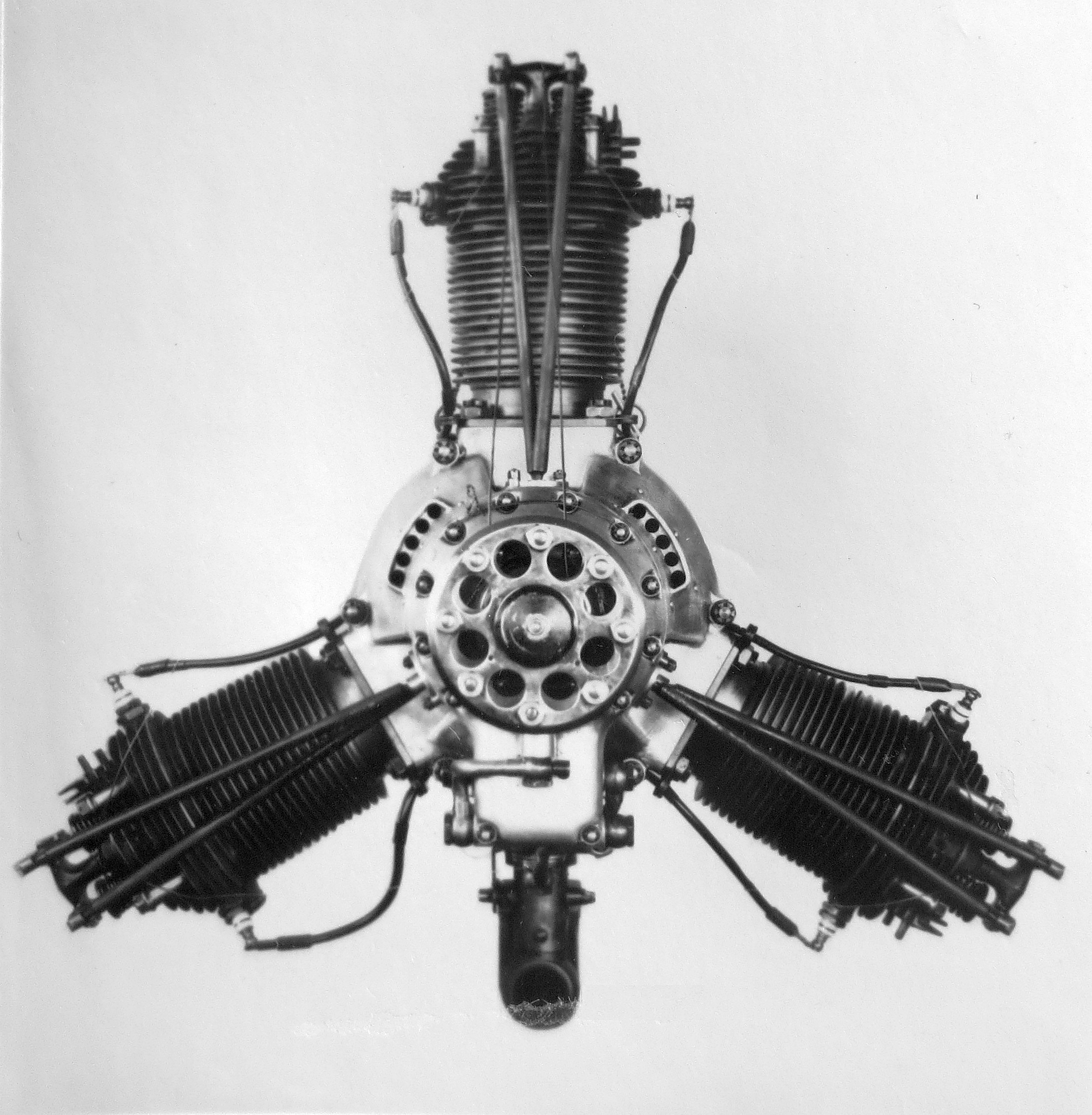
- Walter NZ 45
- Type: Radial aero engine
- National origin: Czechoslovakia
- Manufacturer: Walter Aircraft Engines
- First run: 1929
- Developed from: Walter NZ 60

The Walter NZ 40 was an unsuccessful, three-cylinder, air-cooled, radial engine for aircraft use built in Czechoslovakia by Walter Aircraft Engines in the late-1920s.

== Design and development ==
Using common cylinders and parts from the earlier Walter NZ 60 (Novák-Zeithammer) engine the NZ 40 was the last in this series of engines. Problems with imbalance causing vibrations lead to the type being redesigned as the NZ 45. This version underwent a type test in early 1932 but the problems were not fully resolved and the engine did not find any aircraft application. Very few of these engines were produced before being replaced in the range by the Walter Polaris.

== Specifications (NZ 40) ==
Data from Němeček.

=== General characteristics ===
- Type: Three-cylinder radial piston engine
- Bore: 105 mm (4.13 in)
- Stroke: 120 mm (4.72 in)
- Displacement: 3.12 L (190 cu in)
- Length: 695 mm (27.4 in)
- Diameter: 965 mm (38.0 in)
- Dry weight: 72 kg (159 lb)

=== Components ===
- Valvetrain: Overhead valve, two valves per cylinder
- Fuel system: Zenith carburettor
- Oil system: Pressure fed, dry sump
- Cooling system: Air-cooled
- Reduction gear: Direct drive

=== Performance ===
- Power output: 33 kW (44 hp) at 1,700 rpm
- Compression ratio: 4.48:1

== See also ==
Comparable engines

- Blackburne Thrush
- Szekely SR-3

Related lists

- List of aircraft engines
