= Fiat 509 =

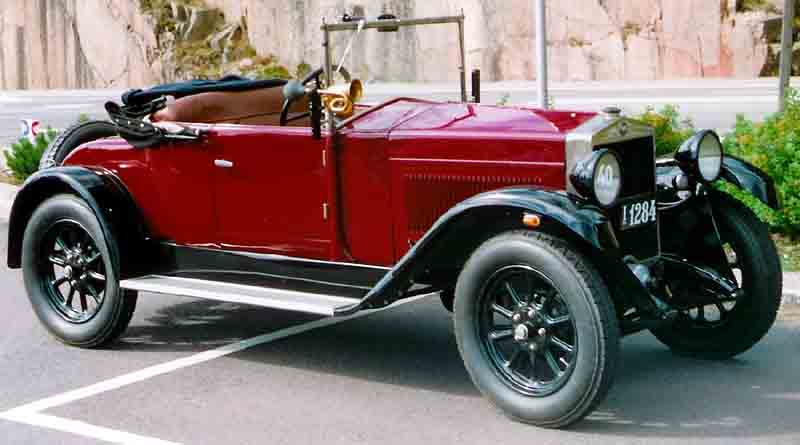
- Fiat 509 Spider 1925

Overview
- Manufacturer: Fiat
- Production: 1924–1929

Body and chassis
- Class: Small family car (C)
- Body style: 2/4-door sedan 2/4-door cabriolet 2-door spyder
- Layout: FR layout

Powertrain
- Engine: 990 cc SOHC I4
- Transmission: 3-speed manual

Dimensions
- Wheelbase: 255 cm (100.4 in)
- Curb weight: 650 kg (1,430 lb)-800 kg (1,800 lb)

Chronology
- Predecessor: Fiat 501
- Successor: Fiat 508

The Fiat 509 was a model of car produced by Italian automotive manufacturer Fiat between 1925 and 1929 as a replacement for the 501. Approximately 90,000 of the model were sold. In 1926 the car was upgraded to the 509A. For 1928, the 509 was offered with standard insurance, also.

In addition to as the standard car, there were 509S and 509SM sports models, as well as taxi and commercial versions.

== Engines ==
The Fiat 509 was fitted with a 990 cc overhead cam engine.

Model	Years	Engine	Displacement	Power	Fuel system
509	1924-29	inline-four SOHC	990 cc	22 PS (16 kW)	single carburetor
509 S	1925-29	inline-four SOHC	990 cc	27 PS (20 kW)	single carburetor
509 SM	1925-29	inline-four SOHC	990 cc	30 PS (22 kW)	single carburetor

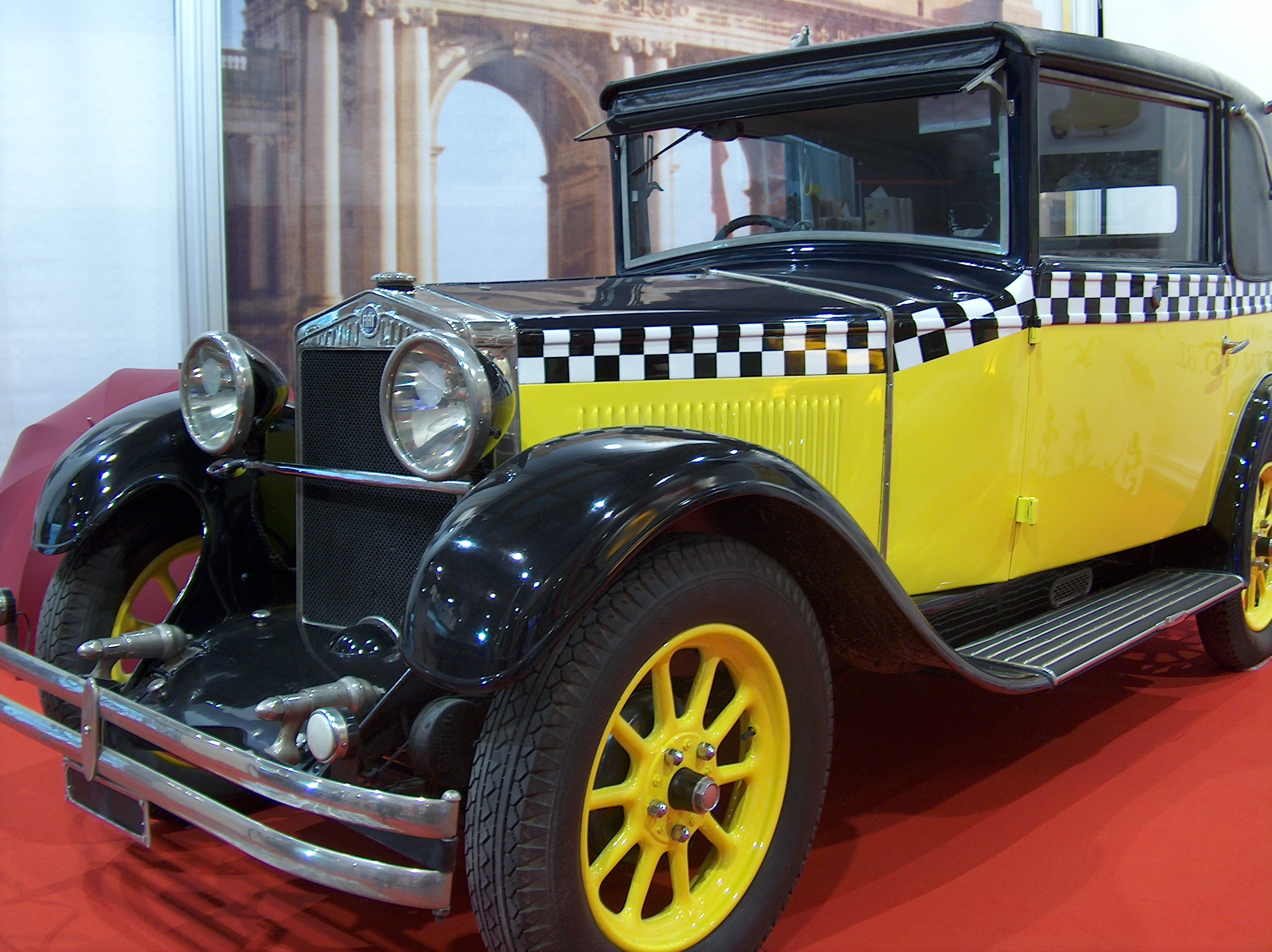
Fiat 509 at the European Motor Show Brussels 2006; this particular car is painted to resemble Gaston Lagaffe's car

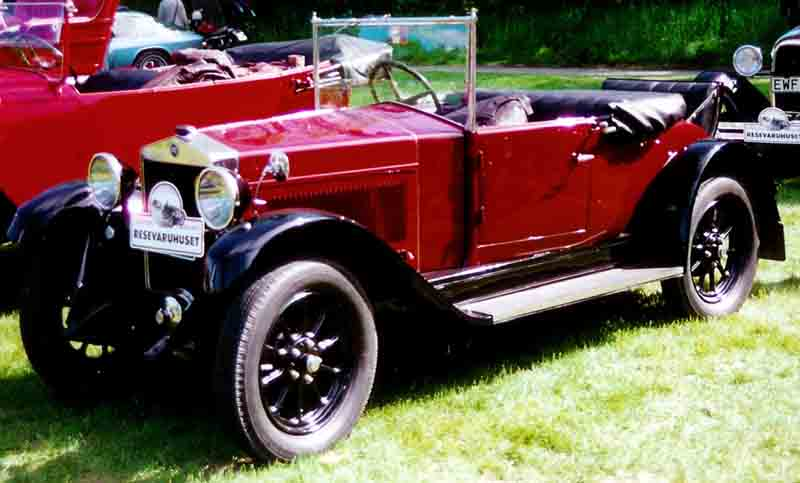
Fiat 509 Spider

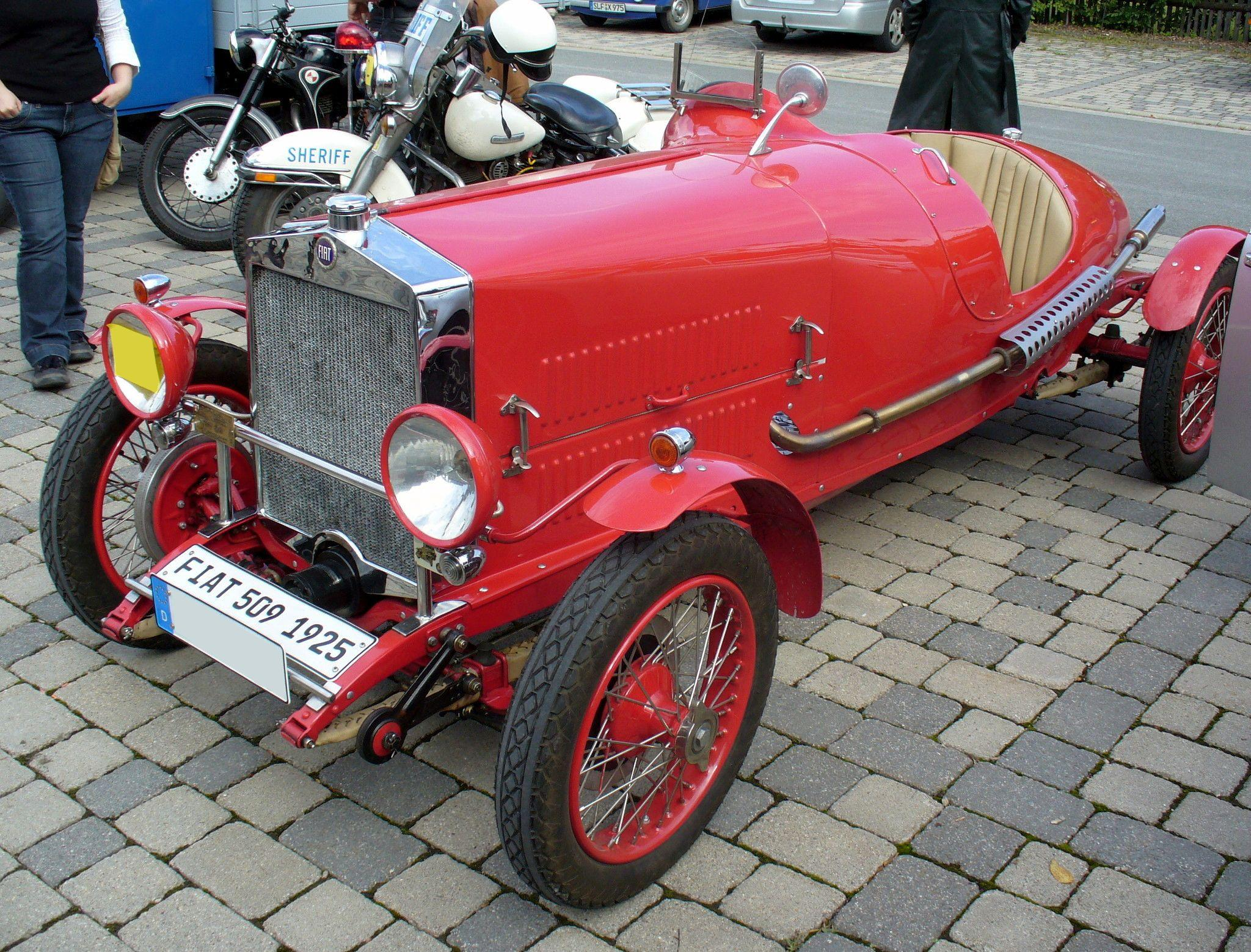
Fiat 509 SM 1925

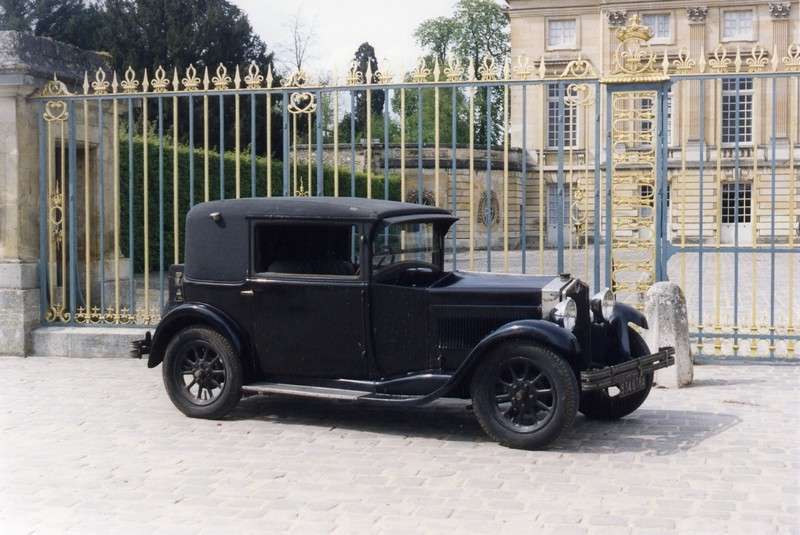
Fiat 509 Coupé Royal 1929 Pourtout

== In popular culture ==
A yellow and black Fiat 509 serves as the car of the Belgian comic character Gaston Lagaffe and is the center of many gags throughout the series.
