= Letov Š-39 =

Š-39
- Letov Š-239

General information
- Type: Sport aircraft
- National origin: Czechoslovakia
- Manufacturer: Letov

History
- First flight: 1931

The Letov Š-39 was a sport aircraft produced in Czechoslovakia during the 1930s. It was a conventional, parasol-wing monoplane with fixed tailskid undercarriage, and seating for the pilot and passenger in tandem, open cockpits. Because the cabane struts were very short, and the wing therefore placed very close to the top of the fuselage, the cockpits had the unusual arrangement of the passenger's being in front of the wing while the pilot's was behind it. The outer half of each wing was fitted with fixed slats along the leading edge. An initial batch of 23 machines was built for use by Czech aeroclubs. These were followed by batches of aircraft with alternative powerplants.

== Variants ==
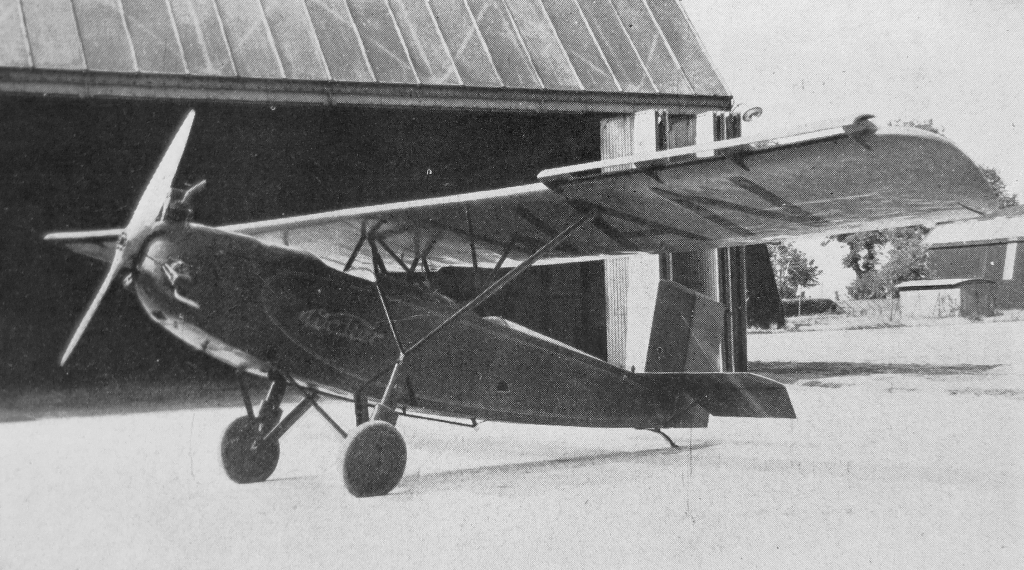
Letov Š-39 (OK-WAN) with Walter Polaris II engine

Š-39
Prototype with Orion LL-50 engine followed by production batch with Walter Polaris engines
Š-139
Production model with Pobjoy R engine and Townend ring
Š-239
Production model with Walter Minor 4 engine

== Specifications (Š-39) ==
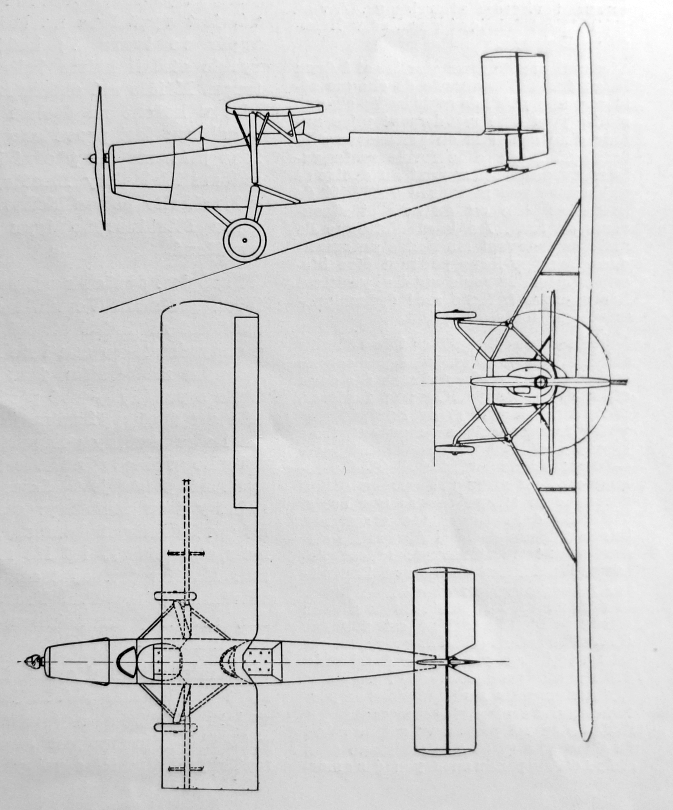
Three-view drawing, Letov Š-239

Data from Monografie: Letov Š-39, -139, -239

General characteristics

- Crew: One pilot
- Capacity: 1 passenger
- Length: 6.45 m (21 ft 2 in)
- Wingspan: 10.40 m (34 ft 1 in)
- Height: 2.25 m (7 ft 5 in)
- Wing area: 14.0 m^{2} (151 sq ft)
- Empty weight: 270 kg (595 lb)
- Gross weight: 522 kg (1,151 lb)
- Powerplant: 1 × Walter Polaris , 45 kW (60 hp)

Performance

- Maximum speed: 153 km/h (95 mph, 83 kn)
- Cruise speed: 130 km/h (81 mph, 70 kn)
- Range: 408 km (254 mi, 220 nmi)
- Service ceiling: 3,500 m (11,500 ft)
- Time to altitude: 9 minutes to 1,000 m (3,300 ft)
