= Walter Regulus =

1930s Czech piston aircraft engine

Regulus
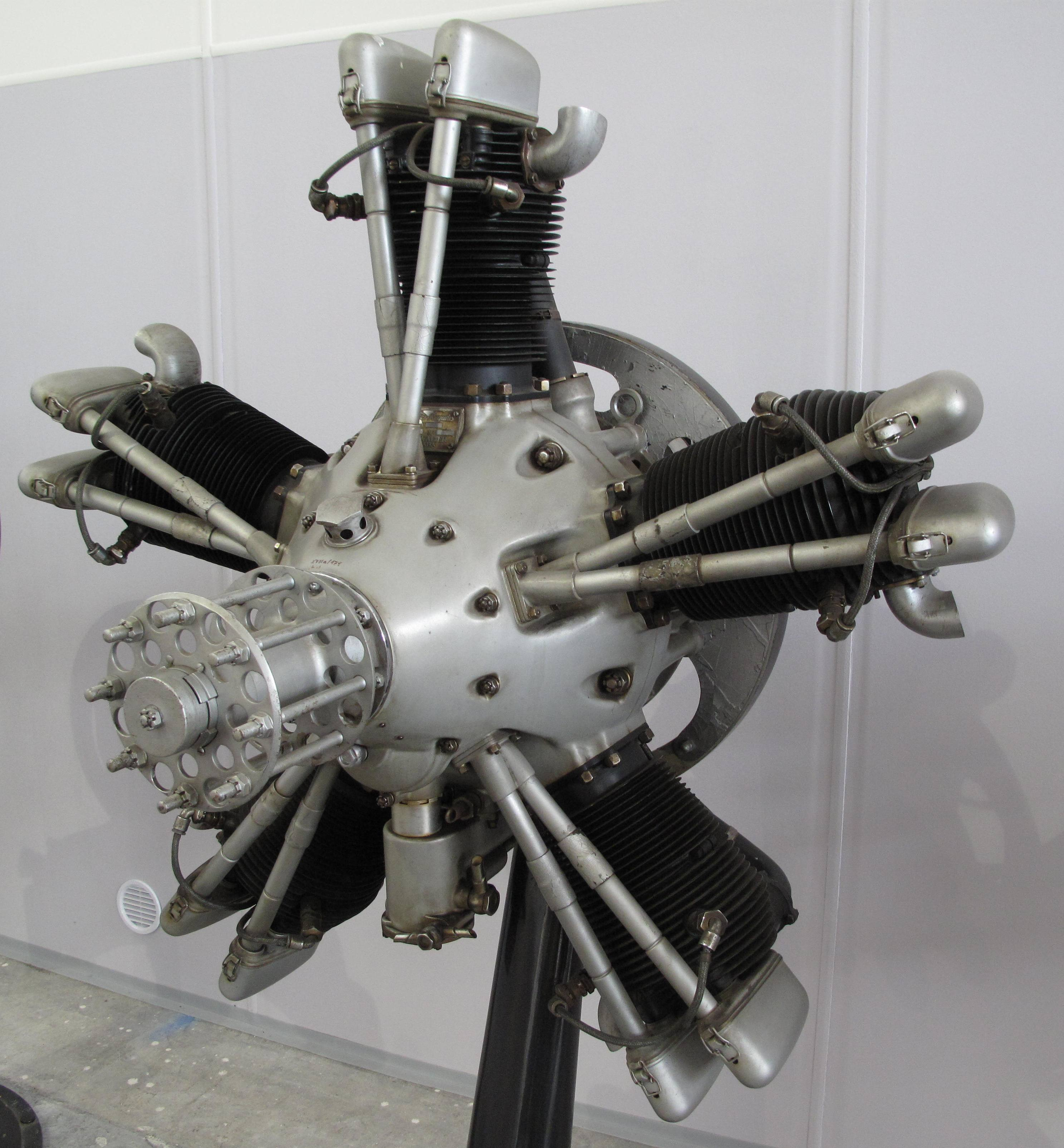
- Walter Regulus II
- Type: Radial aero engine
- National origin: Czechoslovakia
- Manufacturer: Walter Aircraft Engines
- First run: 1934

The Walter Regulus was a Czechoslovak five-cylinder, air-cooled radial engine for powering light aircraft that first ran in 1934. The engine produced 186 kW (250 hp).

== Engines on display ==
A preserved example of the Walter Regulus engine is on display at the following museum:

- Prague Aviation Museum, Kbely

== Specifications (Regulus) ==
Data from Jane's all the World's Aircraft 1931

=== General characteristics ===
- Type: 5-cylinder radial piston engine
- Bore: 135 mm (5.3 in)
- Stroke: 160 mm (6.3 in)
- Displacement: 11.45 L (699 cu in)
- Length: 1,104 mm (43.5 in)
- Diameter: 1,185 mm (46.7 in)
- Dry weight: 191 kg (421 lb)

=== Components ===
- Valvetrain: One intake and one exhaust valve per cylinder operated by pushrods and rockers
- Fuel system: One Zenith double 50DCJ carburettor
- Fuel type: Benzine / Benzol 50:50
- Oil system: dry sump, pressure system
- Cooling system: Air-cooled

=== Performance ===
- Power output: Normal:138 kW (185 hp) at 1,800 rpm; Maximum 170 kW (230 hp)
- Compression ratio: 5.7:1
- Specific fuel consumption: 0.282 kg/kWh (0.464 lb/(hp⋅h))
- Oil consumption: 0.013 kg/kWh (0.022 lb/(hp⋅h))

== See also ==
Comparable engines

- Armstrong Siddeley Mongoose
- Kinner R-5

Related lists

- List of aircraft engines
