= Walter Mars =

1930s Czech piston aircraft engine

Mars
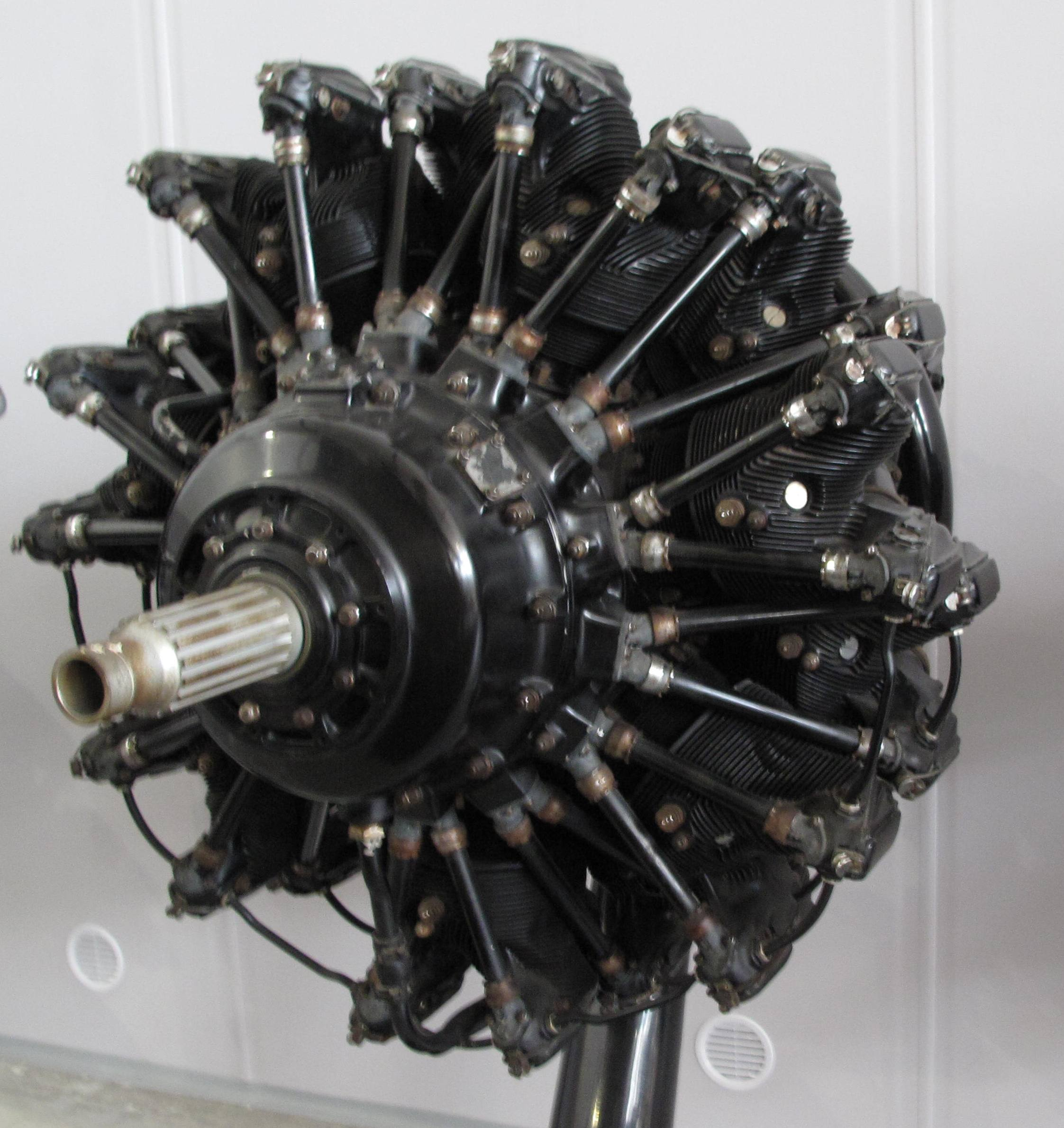
- Walter Mars 14 M
- Type: Radial aero engine
- National origin: Czechoslovakia
- Manufacturer: Walter Aircraft Engines

The Walter Mars was a Czechoslovak 14-cylinder, air-cooled radial engine for powering aircraft, a licensed built Gnome-Rhône 14M.

== Applications ==
- Focke-Wulf Fw 189 Note. 204 of these airplanes were produced in the Aero Praha factory during the war.

== Engines on display ==
A preserved example of the Walter Mars engine is on display at the following museum:

- Prague Aviation Museum, Kbely

== Specifications (Mars) ==
Data from Letectvi, 1937.

=== General characteristics ===
- Type: 14-cylinder two-row radial piston engine
- Bore: 122 mm (4.8 in)
- Stroke: 116 mm (4.6 in)
- Displacement: 18.98 L (1,158 cu in)
- Length: 1,282 mm (50.5 in)
- Diameter: 964 mm (38.0 in)
- Dry weight: 420 kg (930 lb)

=== Components ===
- Valvetrain: One intake and one exhaust valve per cylinder
- Fuel system: Carburettor
- Fuel type: Petrol
- Cooling system: Air-cooled

=== Performance ===
- Power output: 700 hp (520 kW) at 3,030 rpm
- Specific power: 27.3 KW/L
- Compression ratio: 6.5:1
- Power-to-weight ratio: 1.23 KW/Kg

== See also ==
Related lists

- List of aircraft engines
