= Walter Aircraft Engines =

Motor vehicle and aircraft engine manufacturer in Czechia

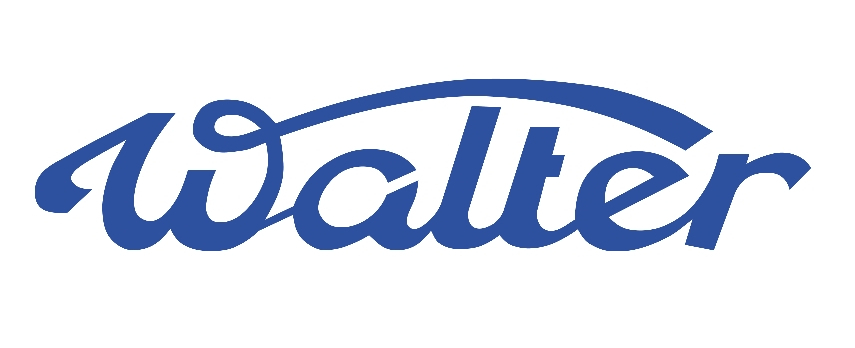
- Type: Subsidiary
- Industry: Automobiles, Aerospace
- Founded: 1911; 115 years ago
- Headquarters: Prague, Czech Republic
- Parent: GE Aerospace

Walter Aircraft Engines is an aircraft engine manufacturer and former automotive manufacturer. Its notable products include the M601 turboprop. The company is based in Prague, Czech Republic. It has been a subsidiary of GE Aerospace since July 2008, as GE Aviation Czech.

== History ==
Josef Walter founded the company in 1911 to make motorcycles and motor tricycles. It started to make automobiles in 1913: initially its own models, and later the Fiat 508, 514, 522 and 524 under licence.

By 1926 Walter was Czechoslovakia's fourth-largest car maker by sales volume. In 1929 it still held fourth place, and production peaked at 1,498 cars for the year. By 1932 Walter production had slumped to 217 cars for the year. The figure recovered to 474 in 1933, but fell again to 102 in 1936 and to only 13 in 1937.

Walter ceased car production in 1954.

Walter Standard 6

From the early 1920s Walter also manufactured BMW aircraft engines under license, as well as its own family of air-cooled radial piston engines. In the 1930s Walter also made Bristol Jupiter, Mercury and Pegasus engines under licence, and then created its own in-line inverted air-cooled four- and six-cylinder engines, and in 1936 an air-cooled inverted V12. Walter aircraft engines were used by the air forces of 13 countries before World War II.

During World War II Walter made Argus engines under license for Germany. Manufacture of the BMW 003 turbojet was put into preparation, but none were produced.

The Walter plant survived the war intact and in 1946 the company was nationalised as Motorlet n.p. It made Soviet-licensed piston engines, and in 1952 began manufacturing the Walter M-05 jet engine. This was the Soviet Klimov VK-1 engine, based on the Rolls-Royce Nene, which powered the MiG-15, and was exported to many countries. The company made a series of Soviet-designed engines during the 1950s and 1960s, though piston engine production was closed and transferred to Avia in 1964.

In 1995, the company was privatised as Walter a.s., and in 2005 the aviation engine division became Walter Aircraft Engines. In July 2006 it was acquired by the Czech investment firm, FF Invest. In March 2007 it was announced that Walter Aircraft Engines would merge with Avia's aero-engine division. The company was also merged with the precision casting company PCS.

In September 2007, it was announced that the company's assets (which do not include its current facility in Prague) would be purchased by GE Aviation. The transaction was completed in July 2008. GE's interest in Walter has to do with the former's desire to compete more aggressively with Pratt & Whitney in the small turboprop market; Pratt & Whitney holds a commanding market share there. Walter builds the M601 engine, which GE hopes to refine and position against Pratt & Whitney's PT6. Walter currently (in the 1980s) builds 120 M601 engines per year; GE intended to increase production, by 2012, to 1,000 engines per year.

== Walter engine families ==
Data from:Engine Data Sheets:Czechoslovakian Aero Engines

Walter developed families of engines based on common bore and stroke:

Atom / Mikron
Bore x Stroke 85 mm × 96 mm (3.35 in × 3.78 in)
Minor
Bore x Stroke 105 mm × 115 mm (4.14 in × 4.53 in)
Junior
Bore x Stroke 115 mm × 140 mm (4.53 in × 5.51 in)
Major / Sagitta
Bore x Stroke 118 mm × 140 mm (4.65 in × 5.51 in)

== Engines ==
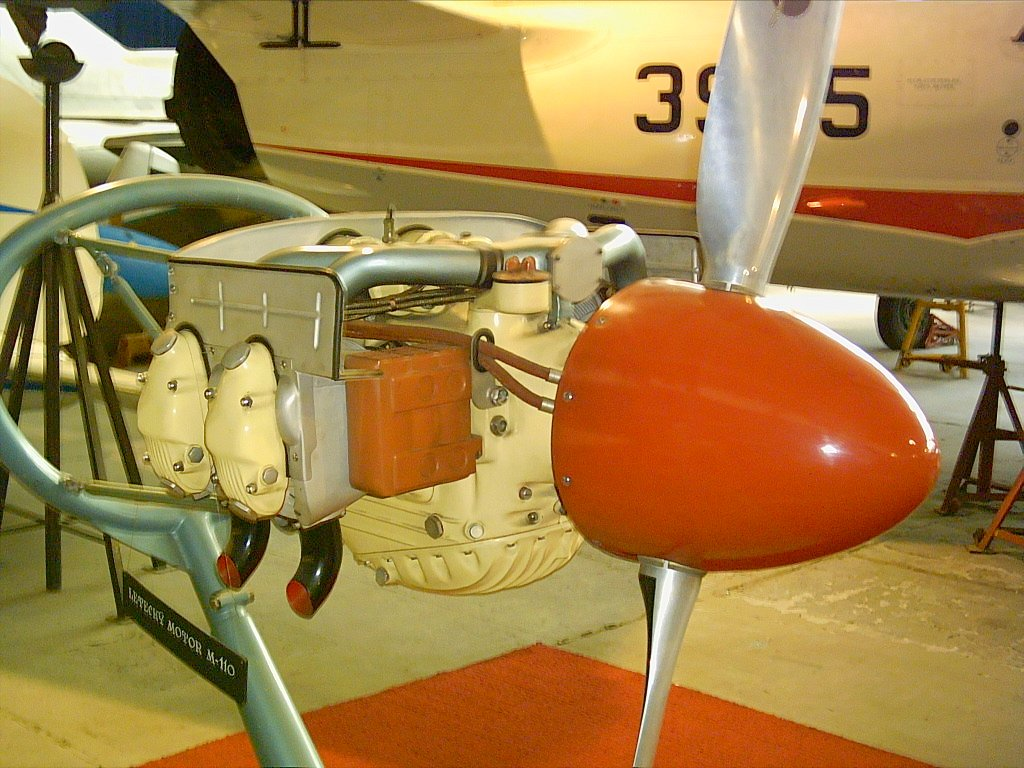
M110

=== Radial ===
- Walter Atlas
- Walter Bora
- Walter Castor
- Walter Gemma
- Walter Mars I
- Walter Mars - license built Gnome-Rhône 14M.
- Walter Merkur - license built Bristol Mercury
- Walter NZ 40
- Walter NZ 60
- Walter NZ 85
- Walter NZ 120
- Walter Polaris
- Walter Pollux
- Walter Regulus
- Walter Scolar
- Walter Super Castor - 9-cylinder development of the Castor
- Walter Venus
- Walter Vega

=== Inline ===
- Walter Junior
- Walter Major
- Walter Mikron -produced 1935 onwards
- Walter Minor - first produced 1929, from 105 to 160 hp outputs
- Walter M332 - entered production in 1958
- Walter M337 - 6-cylinder development of the M332
- Walter M431 (project)
- Walter M436 (project)

=== V12 ===
- Walter M446 (project)
- Walter Minor 12
- Walter Sagitta

=== Horizontally-opposed ===
- Walter Atom
- Walter A
- Walter M110
- Walter M202
- Walter M208

=== Turbojet ===
- Motorlet M-701

=== Turboprop ===
- Walter M601
- Walter M602
- GE Catalyst (Formerly ATP)

== Engines built under license ==
- Bristol Jupiter as Walter Jupiter
- Gnome-Rhône 14M as Walter Mars 14M
- Bristol Mercury as Walter Mercury
- Pobjoy R as Walter Mira R
- Gnome-Rhône Mistral Major as Walter Mistral 14K
- Packard DR-980 as Walter Packard Diesel
- Bristol Pegasus as Walter Pegasus
- BMW IIIa as Walter W-III
- BMW IV as Walter W-IV
- Junkers Jumo 204 as Walter Jumo IV C
- Fiat A.20 as Walter W-V, W-VI, W-VII and W-VIII
- Argus As 10 as Walter Argus 10
- Argus As 410 Walter Argus 410
- Rolls-Royce Nene as Walter M-05
- Klimov VK-1 as Walter M-06
- Walter M-07
- Ivchenko AI-25 as AI-25W

== See also ==
Related lists

- List of aircraft engine manufacturers
