= Balilla =

Genoese boy who started the 1746 anti-Habsburg revolt (1735–1781)

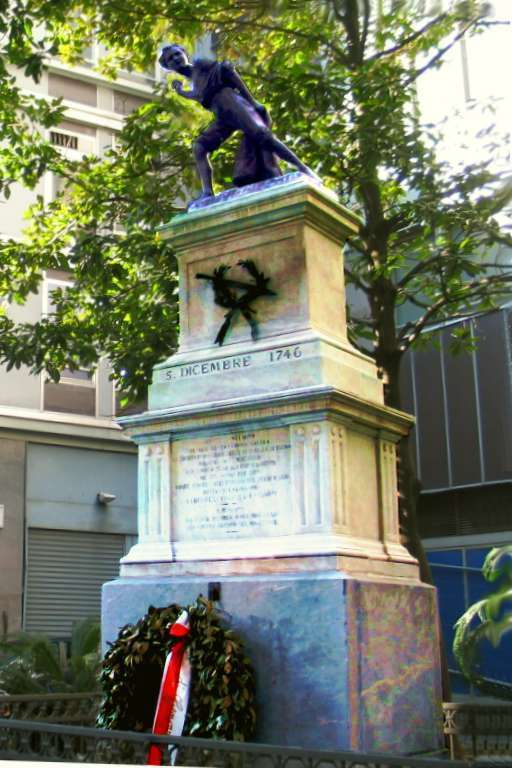
Balilla monument at Portoria Square in Genoa, Italy

Balilla was the nickname of Giovanni Battista Perasso (1735–1781), a Genoese boy who, according to tradition, started the revolt of 1746 against the Habsburg forces that occupied the city in the War of the Austrian Succession by throwing a stone at an Austrian official.

== Story and legacy ==
The word Balilla is thought to mean "little boy" and is thus one of only two clues about Perasso's age (the other being an Austrian report that makes reference to "a little boy" throwing stones at officials).

Legend asserts that while some Austrian soldiers were dragging an artillery piece along a muddy road in the Portoria neighbourhood of Genoa, the piece got stuck in a moat. The soldiers forced onlookers and passers-by to dislodge it, cursing and lashing them. Disgusted by the scene, Perasso allegedly grabbed a stone from the road and skilfully threw it at the Austrian patrol, asking his fellow citizens in the Genoese dialect: "Che l'inçe?" ("Am I to begin?" or "Shall I start?"), which set in motion an uproar which eventually caused the Austrian garrison to be evicted from the city. The phrase became proverbial in Italian as well.

For his supposed age and revolutionary activity, Perasso became a symbol of the struggle of the Italian people for independence and unification. Conversely, accounts of the sack of Genoa by Royal Piedmontese troops in 1849 mention soldiers running through the streets and shouting, "Genoese people are all Balilla, they do not deserve compassion, we must kill them all!".

Later on, Italy's Fascist Government named the Opera Nazionale Balilla (ONB), a school-grade scouting-paramilitary youth organization, after him. Accordingly, the anthem of the ONB began with the verse "Fischia il sasso..." ("The stone whistles...").

Several types of the Fiat 508 car, produced during the 1930s, were also named for Balilla (Fiat 508 Balilla, Fiat 508S Balilla Coppa d'Oro, Fiat 508 Balilla Sport, Fiat 508 Balilla Spider Militare). An Italian fighter plane designed in 1917, the Ansaldo A.1, was named Balilla.

He is also mentioned in the Italian National anthem, "Il Canto degli Italiani", composed in 1847: "I bimbi d'Italia / si chiaman Balilla" ("The children of Italy / are all named Balilla").

== Italian Navy submarines ==
Two Italian navy submarines were named Balilla:

- The former German U42 which was building at the FIAT yard in La Spezia when Italy entered World War I. It was sunk in 1916.
- The nameship of the Balilla class submarines, laid up in 1941 and scrapped after World War II.
