= Walter Atlas =

1930s Czech piston aircraft engine

Atlas
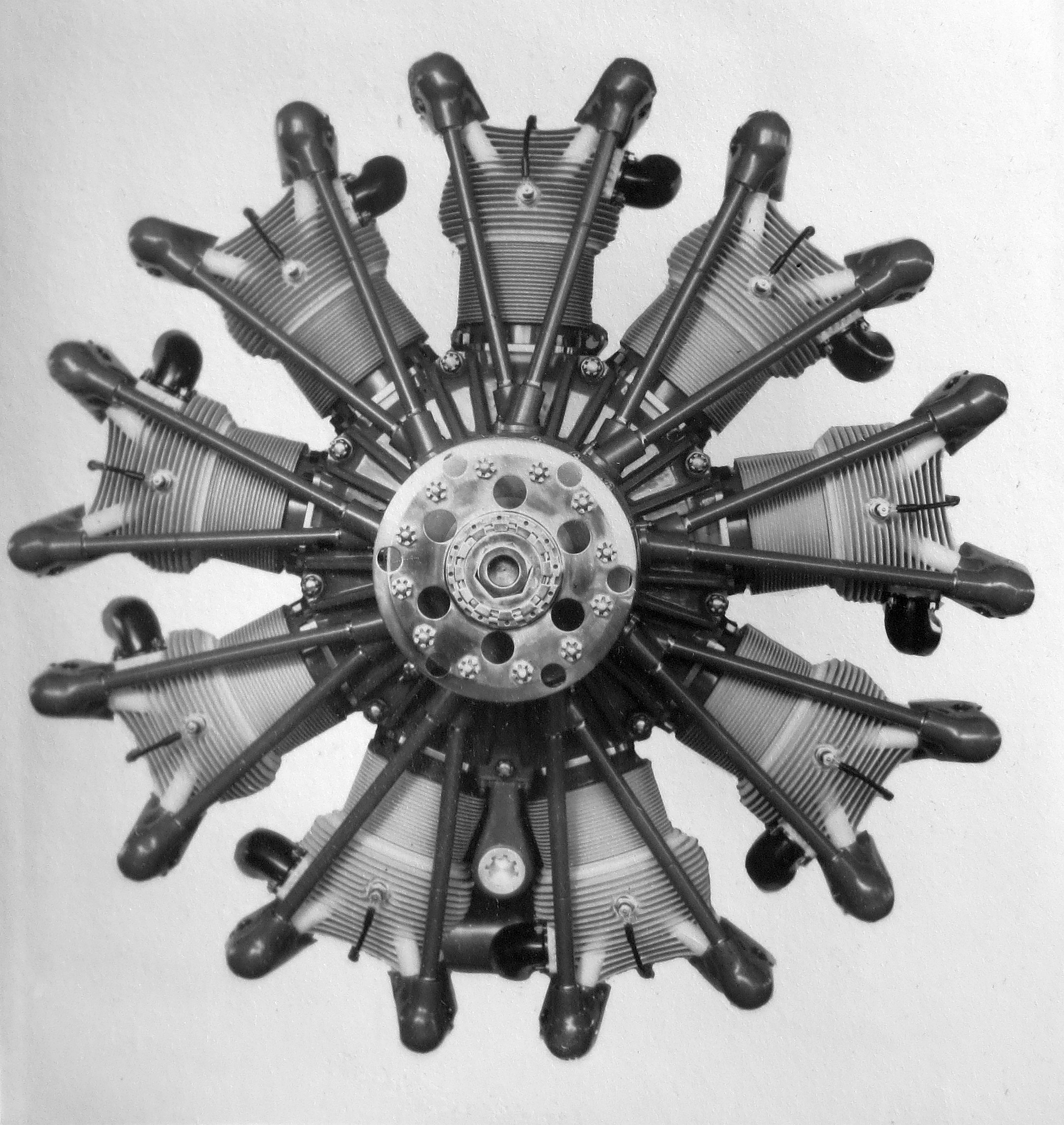
- Type: Nine-cylinder radial engine
- National origin: Czechoslovakia
- Manufacturer: Walter Engines
- First run: 1930

The Walter Atlas was a nine-cylinder, air-cooled, radial engine for aircraft use built in Czechoslovakia in the early 1930s.

== Design and development ==
The Atlas was the largest capacity and most powerful radial engine design developed by the Walter company. The engine was an attempt at high power output by using a much larger bore size than company's previous range. The engine was test run in spring 1930, encountering problems with cooling and operation.

The engine appeared at the Paris Aerosalon in December of that year. The engine did not attract any customers, further development was cancelled in 1931 and the company moved to producing licensed versions of the Bristol Mercury, Pegasus and Gnome-Rhône 14M.

== Variants ==
Atlas I
Direct drive, maximum power 478 kW (641 hp) at 1,950 rpm.

Atlas IR
Geared drive (ratio 1: 1.625), maximum power 529 kW (709 hp) hp at 1,950 rpm. Weight increased to 540 kg (1,190 lb).

== Specifications ==
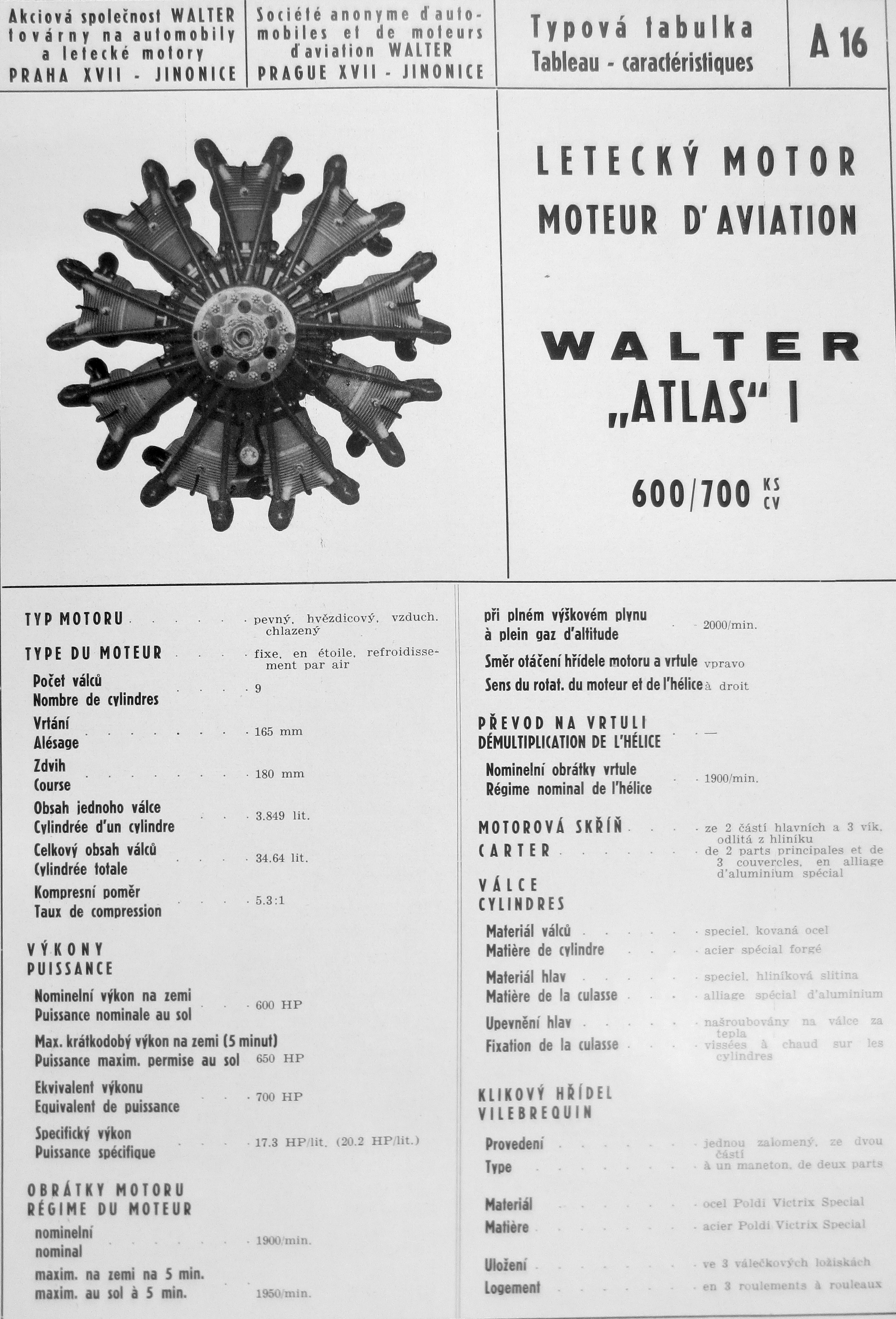
Atlas I data sheet

Data from Němeček and Letecvi.

=== General characteristics ===
- Type: 9-cylinder radial engine
- Bore: 165 mm (6.50 in)
- Stroke: 180 mm (7.09 in)
- Displacement: 34.64 L (2,114 cu in)
- Length: 1,333 mm (52.5 in)
- Diameter: 1,470 mm (57.9 in)
- Dry weight: 480 kg (1,058 lb)

=== Components ===
- Valvetrain: Overhead valve, two valves per cylinder
- Fuel system: Zenith carburettor
- Fuel type: 50% petrol, 50% benzene
- Oil system: Pressure system
- Cooling system: Air-cooled
- Reduction gear: Direct drive
- Starting system: Compressed air

=== Performance ===
- Power output: 478 kW (641 hp) at 1,950 rpm
- Compression ratio: 5.3:1

== See also ==
Related lists

- List of aircraft engines
