= Fiat 508 =

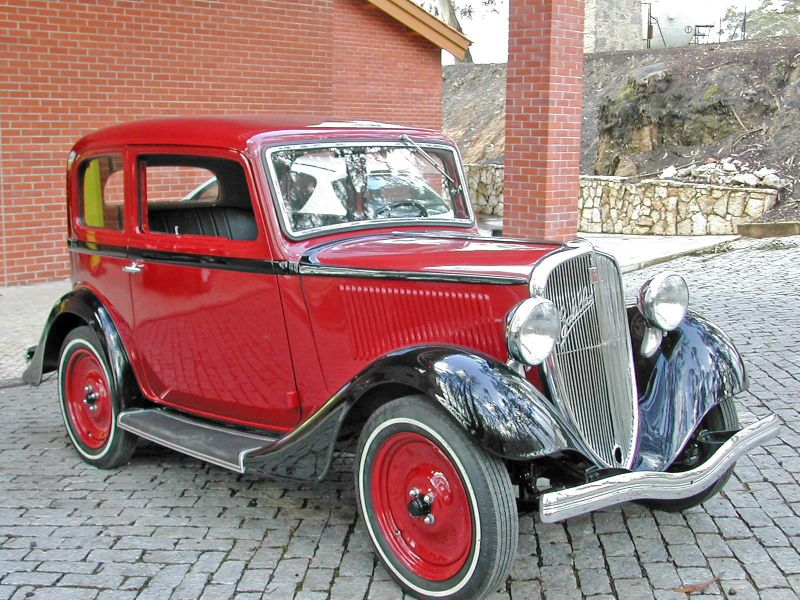
- Fiat 508B 1934

Overview
- Manufacturer: Fiat
- Also called: Fiat 508 Balilla; Fiat 6CV (France); NSU-Fiat 508 (Germany); Polski-Fiat 508 (Poland); Walter Junior (Czechoslovakia)
- Production: 1932–1937
- Assembly: Italy: Lingotto; Czechoslovakia: Jinonice (Walter); Poland: Warsaw (PZInż); Germany: Neckarsulm (NSU); France: Suresnes (SAFAF); France: Nanterre (Simca)

Body and chassis
- Class: Compact car / Small family car (C)
- Body style: 4-door sedan 2-door sedan 2-door spider 4-door torpedo
- Layout: FR layout

Powertrain
- Engine: 995 cc I4
- Transmission: 3-speed manual

Dimensions
- Length: 3,140 mm (123.6 in)
- Width: 1,400 mm (55.1 in)
- Height: 1,530 mm (60.2 in)
- Curb weight: 685 kg (1,510 lb)

Chronology
- Predecessor: Fiat 509
- Successor: Fiat 1100 Balilla (508C)

The Fiat 508 Balilla was a compact car designed and produced by Fiat from 1932 to 1937. It was, effectively, the replacement of the Fiat 509, although production of the earlier model had ceased back in 1929. It had a three-speed transmission (increased to four in 1934), seated four, and had a top speed of about 50 mph (80 km/h). It sold for 10,800 lire (or 8,300 2005 euro). About 113,000 were produced.

The car was also assembled by Walter Motors in Czechoslovakia, in the Państwowe Zakłady Inżynierii passenger vehicle factory in Poland, by NSU-Fiat in Germany, and by SAFAF (rebranded in 1934 as "Simca-Fiat") in France.

== Background ==
The car was developed by some of the leading Italian automotive engineers of the day, including Nebbia, Fessia and Tranquillo Zerbi. The goal was to incorporate some of the qualities of a high class automobile into a modestly priced vehicle. The car had its unveiling on 12 April 1932 at a motor show being held on the Fiera Milano trade fair site.

== Etymology ==
The popular 508 baby Fiat small automobile, one of the early people's cars designed by Dante Giacosa and launched at the 1932 Milan automobile show was christened Fiat Balilla.

Many believe that the "Balilla" name was connected with Italian Fascism, but Fiat later insisted that the car was named after the 1746 Genoa boy-hero, not the fascist youth organisation Opera Nazionale Balilla.

The provenance of the name was actually far older than the Italian Fascist movement. "Balilla" was the dialect-nickname of a Genovese boy called Giovanni Battista Perasso, who back in 1746 threw a stone - according to one report several stones - at an Austrian officer in protest over the Austrian military occupation. The action triggered a Genoese revolt against the Austrians and for this Balilla was celebrated as a local hero in Northern Italy through the intervening two centuries. The story of "Balilla" is nevertheless one of many popular heroic tales from history to have gained in prominence in the early decades of the twentieth century, given the heightened nationalistic characteristic of the period.

Previously, a class of light Regia Marina submarines of the Royal Italian Navy, and a pony tractor by Milan-based firm Motomeccanica had also been christened Balilla, and Fiat themselves had earlier used the name on the small Fiat-Ansaldo A1 biplane aircraft of World War I.

== Fiats 508A (1932–1934) and 508B (1934–1937) ==
The first 508 came with a front-mounted four-cylinder petrol side-valve engine of 995cc. Maximum power was listed as 20 hp (15 kW) at 3500 rpm, providing for a top speed of approximately 80 km/h (50 mph). Power passed to the rear wheels through a 3-speed manual gear box without the assistance of synchromesh on any of the ratios. Stopping power was provided by drum brakes on all four wheels.

At the end of 1933 power was increased to 24 hp (18 kW) at 3500 rpm, and the maximum speed went up to 85 km/h (53 mph). Transmission was upgraded to a four speed gear box. For 1934 the car now came with a slightly more aerodynamic looking "berlina" (saloon/sedan) body, available with either two or four doors. This version was identified as the Fiat 508B, and the original 1932 model was now, retrospectively, became the Fiat 508A.

== Engines ==
The Fiat 508 was fitted with a 995 cc side valve engine.

Model	Years	Engine	Displacement	Power (metric hp)	Fuel system
508	1932–37	side valve, straight-four	995 cc	20-24 hp	single carburetor
508 S	1933–37	side valve, straight-four	995 cc	30-36 hp	single carburetor

== Body versions ==
=== Berlina ===
The first 508A, introduced in 1932, was a 2-door "Berlina" (saloon/sedan) with four seats and a three speed "crash" gearbox. The front seats could be slid forwards and the backrests tilted in order to facilitate access to the back seat in what was a relatively small car. Unusually, the windows in the doors could be wound down by turning a crank handle fitted to the door, while the windscreen was hinged at the top and could be opened, while two windscreen wipers were powered by their own electric motor, positioned inside just above the windscreen. The interior used rubber mats while the seats were cloth covered. Accessories offered included a dash-mounted rear-view mirror, an interior light mounted on the centre of the roof and an externally mounted luggage platform at the back which, when specified, came with the spare wheel repositioned to a mounting point on the side of the car between the left-side door and the front wing. A "Lusso" ("de Luxe") version also featured a better type of cloth covering for the seats as well as extra bright work around the lights, front grille, wheels and door handles.

With the 508B, introduced early in 1934, the body was described as "more aerodynamic" although from the perspective of later developments in car styling, the 508B still followed the rather boxy lines associated with cheap cars from the early 1930s. The gear box was upgraded, now offering four forward speeds, and while the a 2-door "Berlina" remained on offer for a few more months, a 4-door "Berlina" was now added. In June of the same year the 2-door "Berlina" was delisted for Italy and there was a further face-lift for the 4-door bodied car, which now received a modified front grille and a windscreen, previously vertical, that was slightly raked, hinting at the more wholesale styling changes that would accompany the appearance in 1937 of the 508C version of the car. Standard and "Lusso" versions of the 4-door "Berlina" were both offered.

=== Spider ===
The 508 "Spider" was a small 2-door 2-seater cabriolet bodied car. The driver and passenger sat side by side, but the driver's seat was fixed a few centimetres further back than the passenger seat. On the Spider the seat coverings were made from leather. The car was available in both standard and "Lusso" ("de Luxe") versions. The windscreen could be folded down and the removable fabric hood could be stored in a suitably shaped storage bag provided for the purpose. The early "Spider" came with the same three-speed "no-synchromesh" gear-box as the "Berlina". However, it benefited mechanically from the 1934 upgrade, switching to a four-speed transmission. In the case of the "Spider", however, the 1934 upgrade was not accompanied by any change to the body shape.

=== Torpedo ===
A "Torpedo" bodied 508 was added to the range in 1933, with four seats and four doors, and in 1933 still with the 3-speed "crash" gear-box. It was offered only with the "Lusso" ("de Luxe") trimmings. As on the "Spider", seat covers and interior trimmings used coloured leather. The windscreen pillars and door hinges were chrome plated, and the removable fabric hood could be stored in a suitably shaped storage bag provided for the purpose. The upgrade to a four speed transmission in 1934 was not accompanied by any aesthetic changes to the "Torpedo" bodywork.

The Italian military was active in Tripolitania (now known as Libya) during this period, and a special "Torpedo Coloniale" was produced, sharing the features of the regular 508 Torpedo, but this car came with wider tyres and was painted the colour of sand.

=== Spider Sport ===
A lower sleeker shape than the "Spider", styling for the 2-seater "Spider Sport" included a distinctive tail treatment which attracted the catch-phrase "insect tail", designed in 1933 by Ghia and said to have been inspired by small roadster bodied English cars of the period. The early "Spider Sport" models came with the same crash gearbox as the other cars, but the engine was fed by a special carburetor, which with its raised compression ratio of 7:1 gave rise to a maximum output listed as 30 hp (22 kW) at 4,000 rpm. The final drive ratio was also altered, and top speed went up to 110 km/h (69 mph). Fiat 508s with this body type were assembled by Fiat in Italy, and were also included in the production schedules of Fiat affiliates/subsidiaries Germany, France and Czechoslovakia. Various small scale enhanced versions appeared, including the Fiat 508S, known as the "Fiat 508 Coppa d’Oro" ("Gold Cup"), especially prized by collectors 75 years later. The "Spider Sport" received the transmission upgrade to 4 speeds in 1934 together with a special overhead valves (at a time when other 508 variants still came with a side valve engine) and other technical enhancements which pushed the power up to 36 hp (26 kW). The most sporting versions advertised their performance aspirations with a more steeply tapered Tail section

=== Coupé ===
Launched in 1935, the "Coupé" bodied 508 (also sometimes known as the "Berlinetta Mille Miglia") shared its mechanical elements, including the more powerful 108CS engine, with the "Spider Sport". The body was a 2-seater aerodynamic Berlinetta, intended for competition use in colder climates such as those encountered in Northern Italy during the "Mille Miglia" (then run in late Winter). The Coupé may have been warmer in cold weather than the Spider Sport, but it was also heavier: competition success proved elusive.

=== Van ===
A commercial version of the Balilla was offered, both as a panel van or as a small flat-bed truck, with a 350 kg load capacity, based initially on the 3-speed 508A and later on the 4-speed 508B.

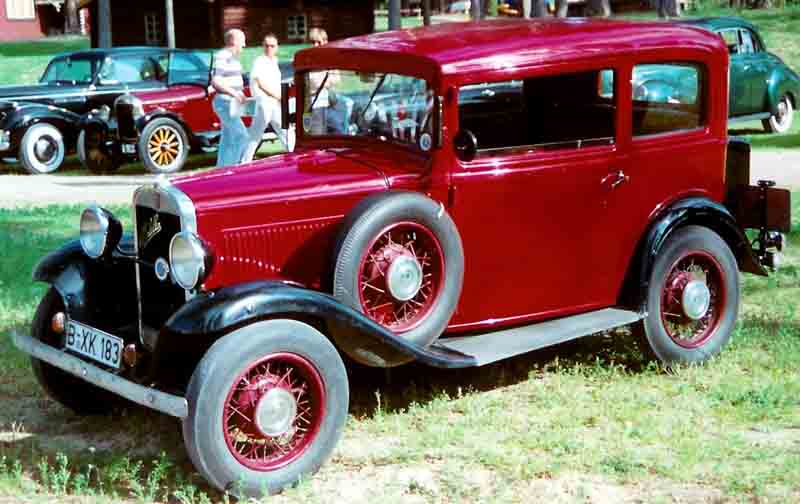
Fiat 508 Balilla 1932–1934

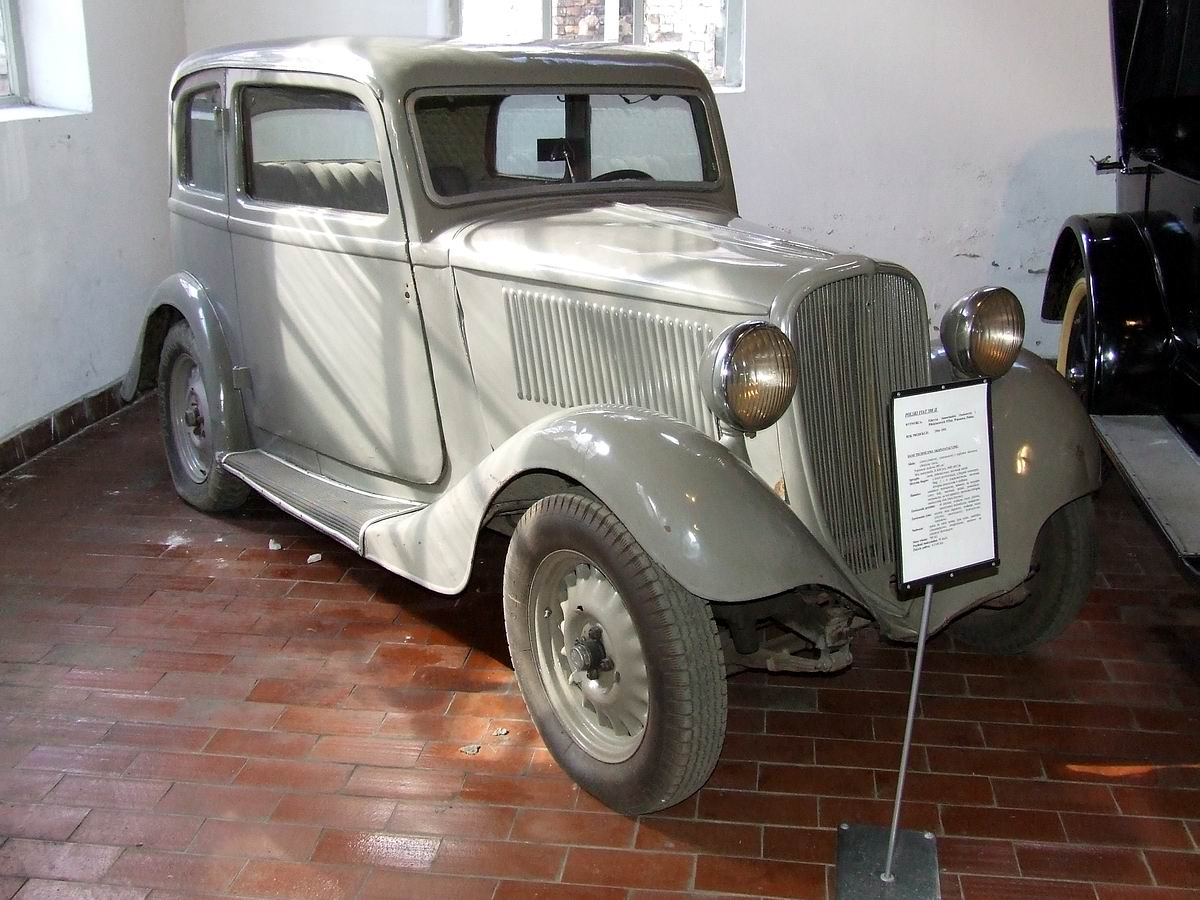
Fiat 508 Balilla 1934–1937

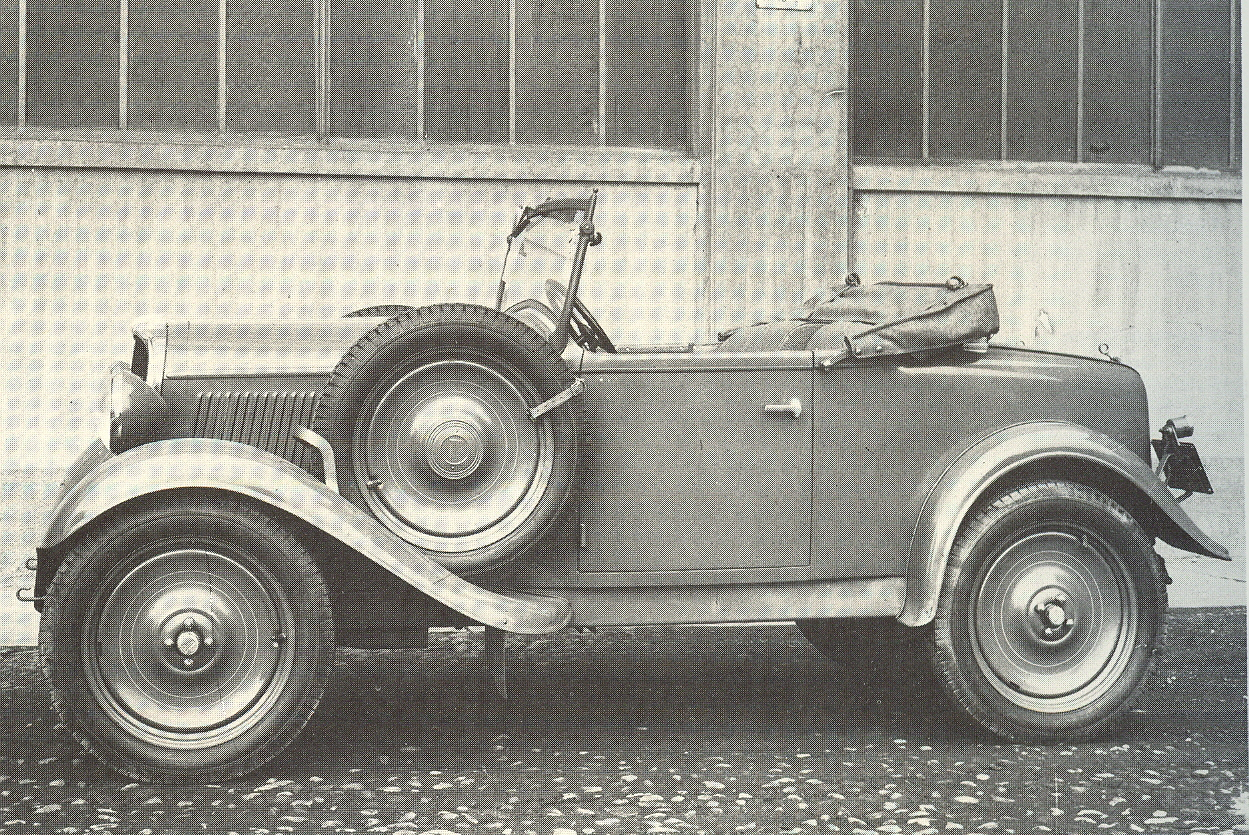
Fiat 508 Balilla Spider Militare 1932

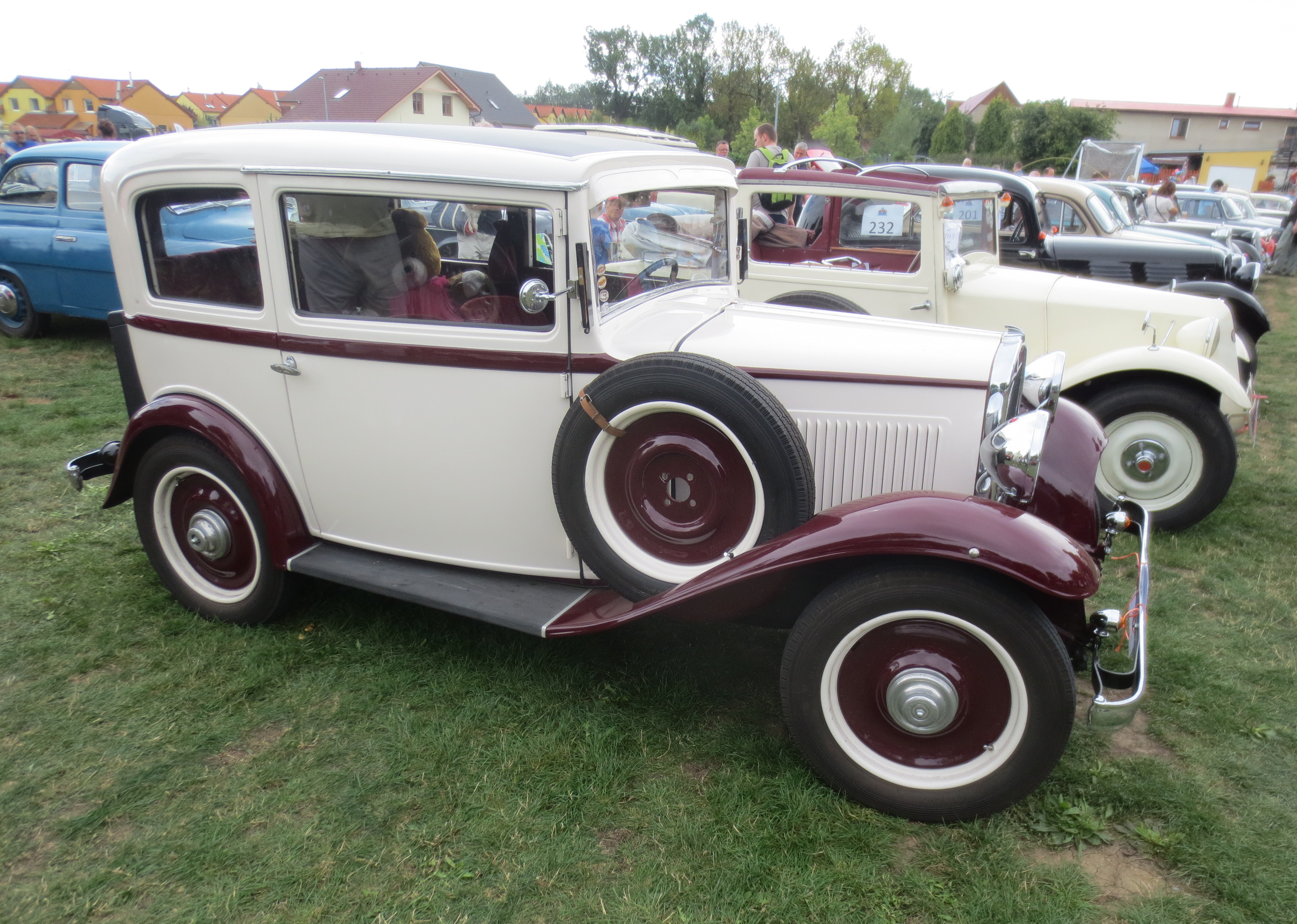
Walter Junior (1933) limousine

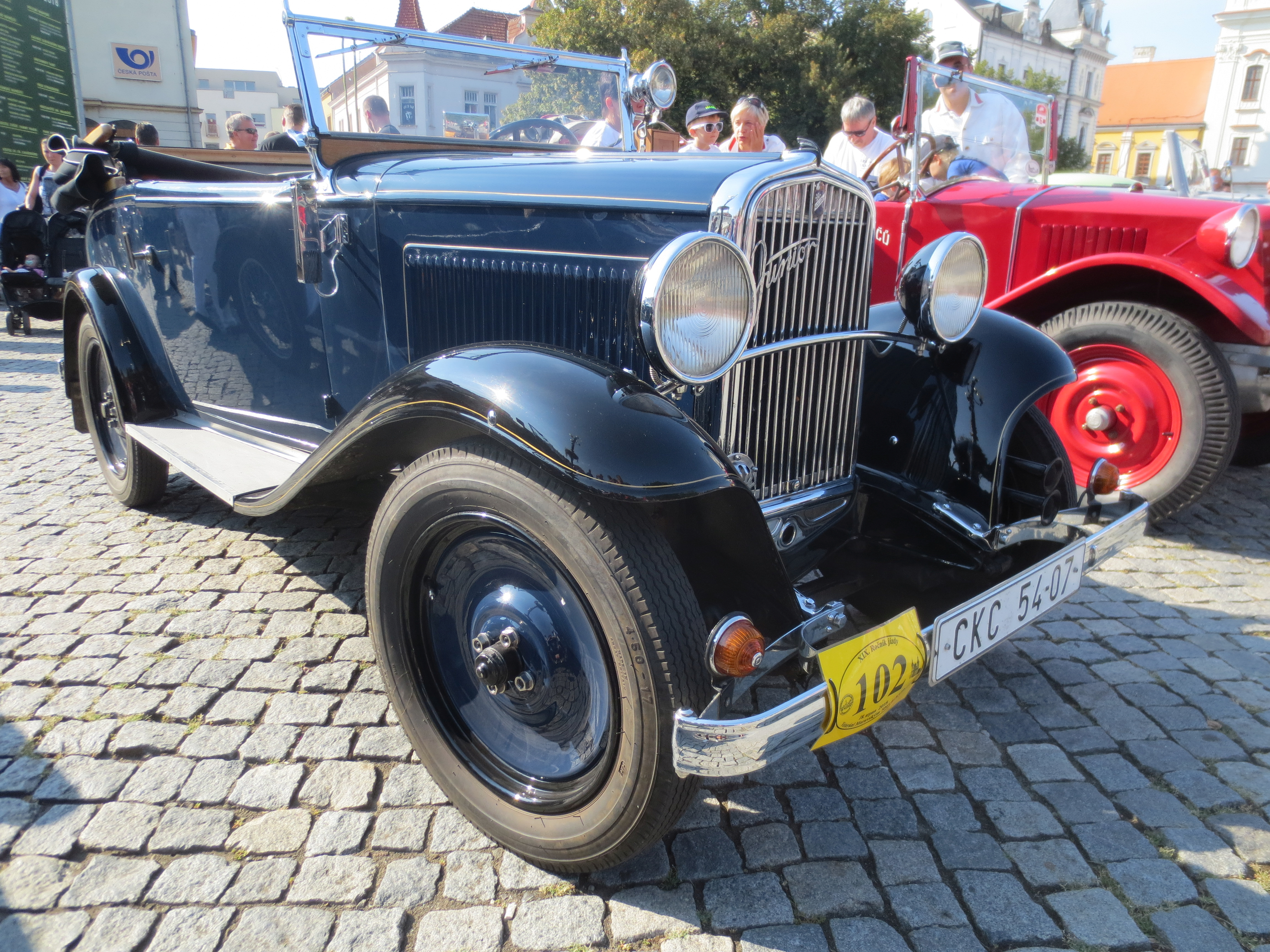
Walter Junior (1934) cabriolet

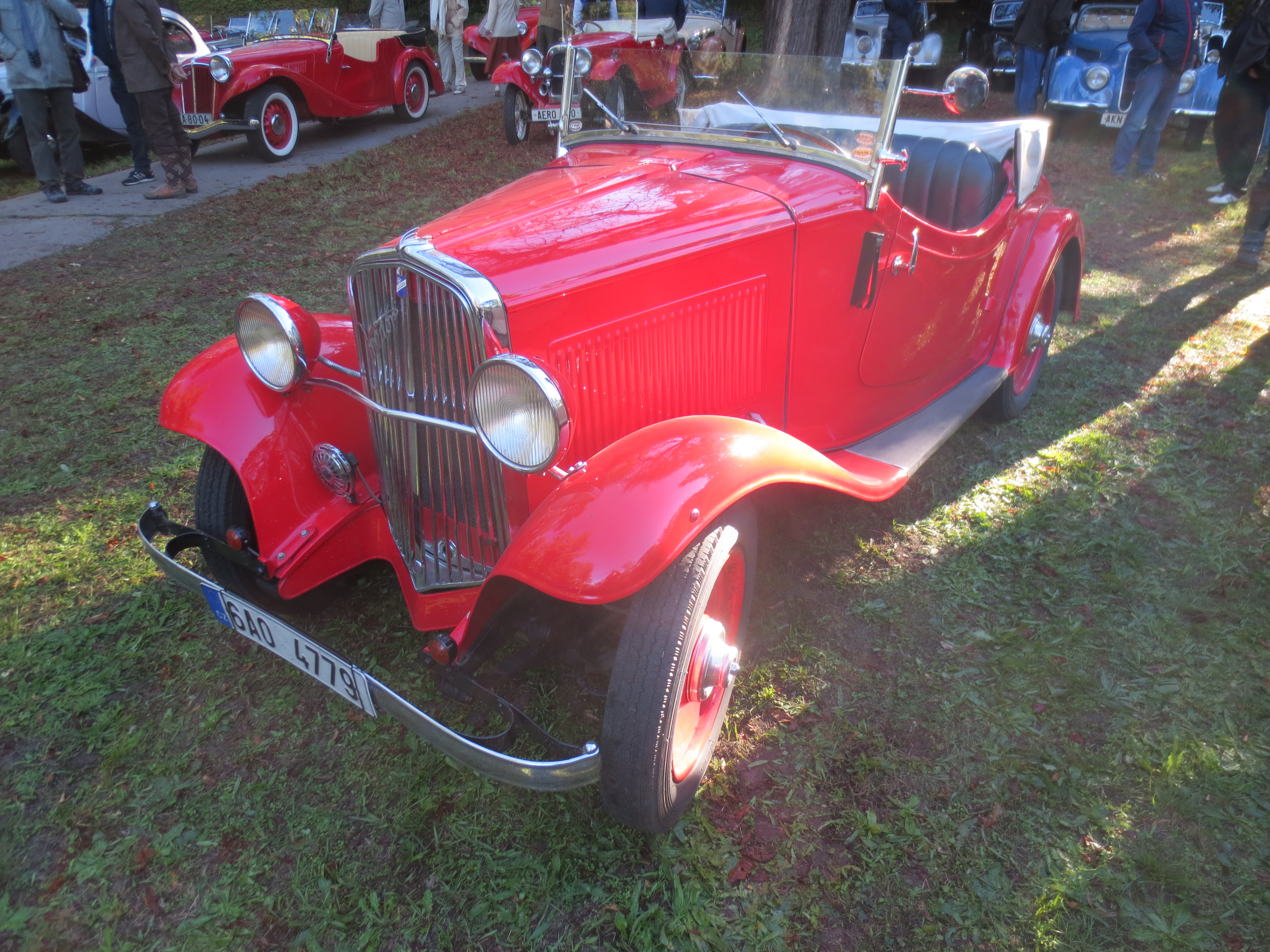
Walter Junior (1933) roadster

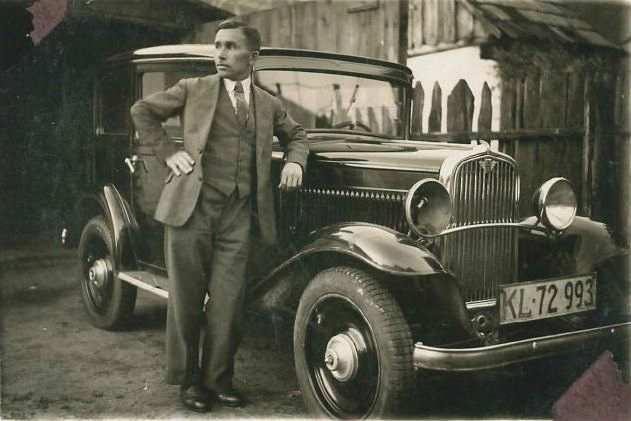
Polski Fiat 508-I

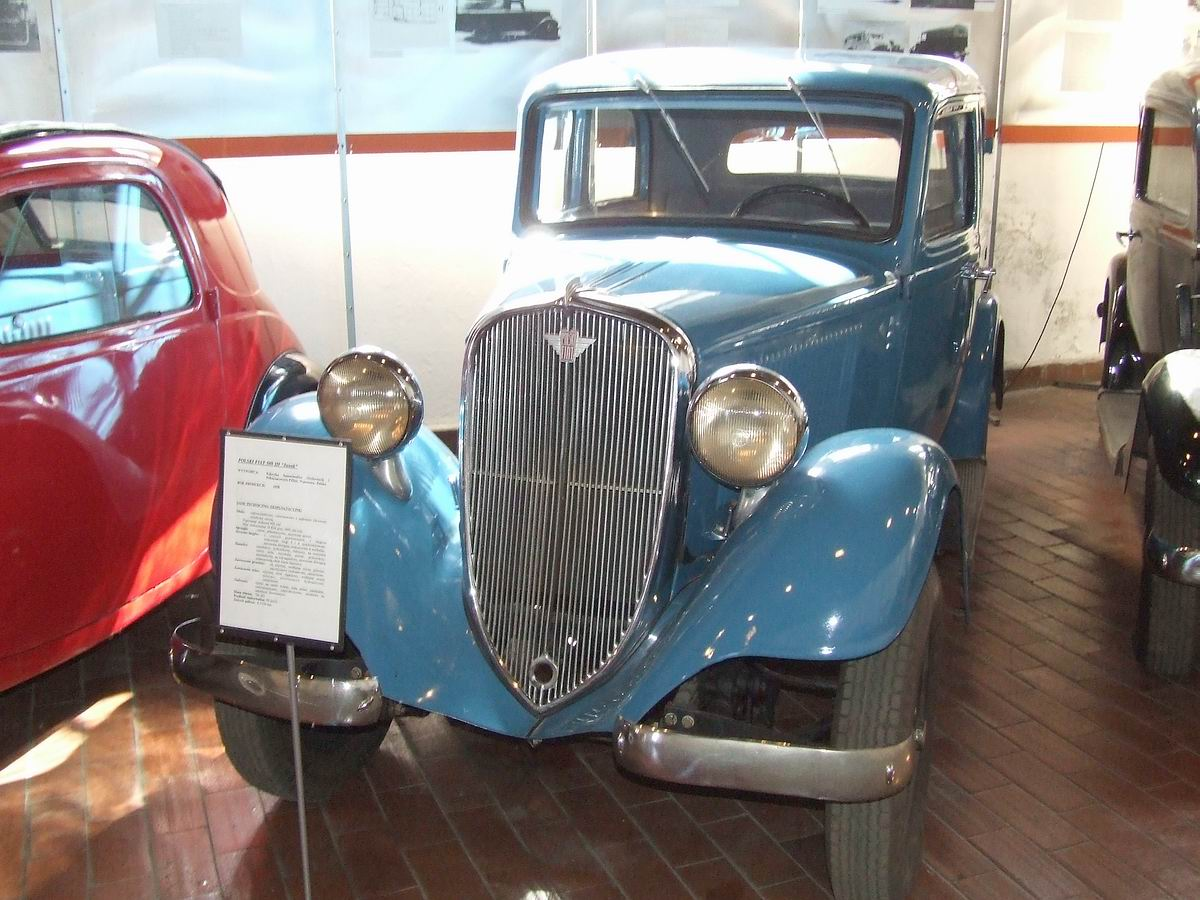
Polski Fiat 508 III Junak
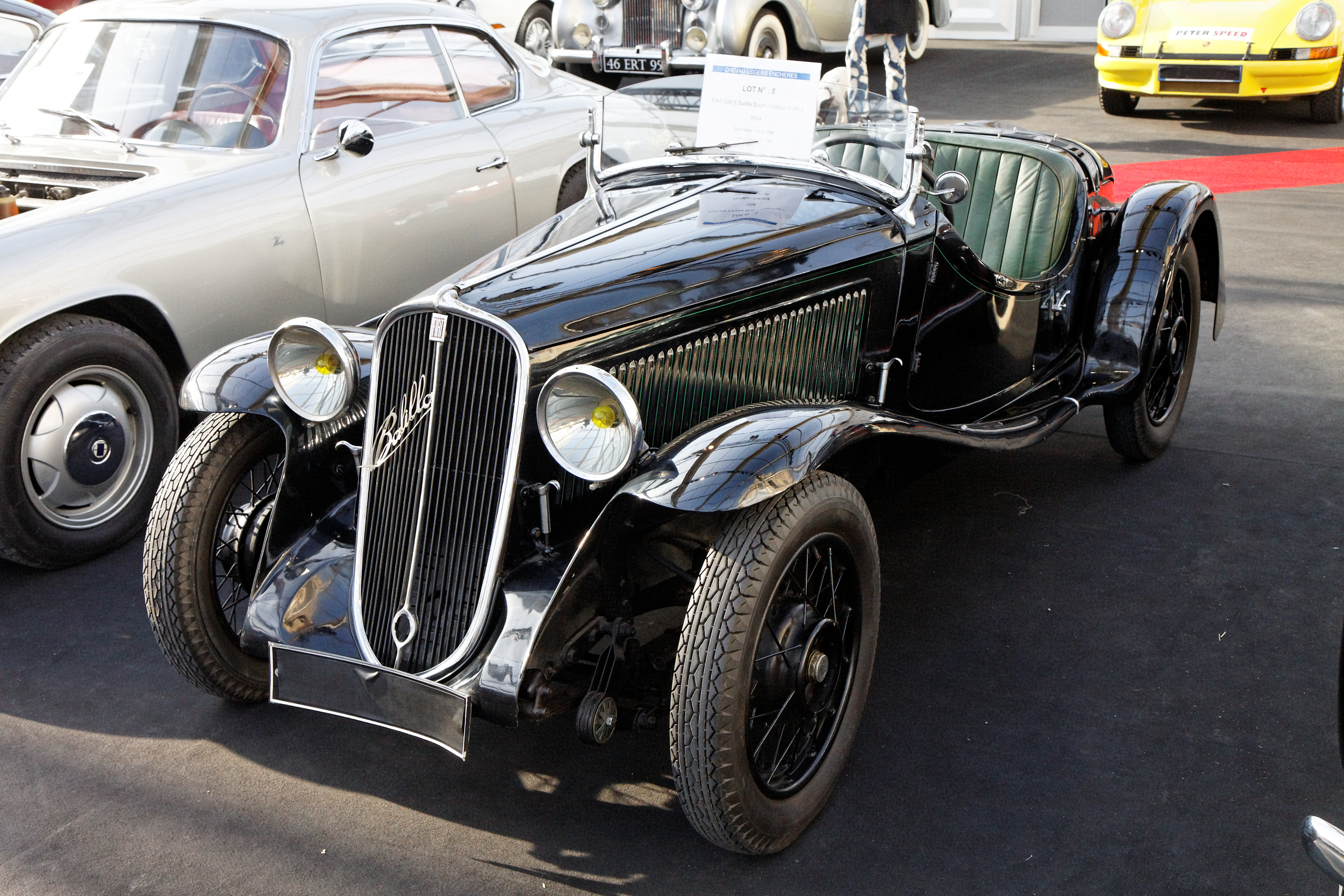
Fiat 508S Balilla Sport 'Coppa d'Oro' 1934

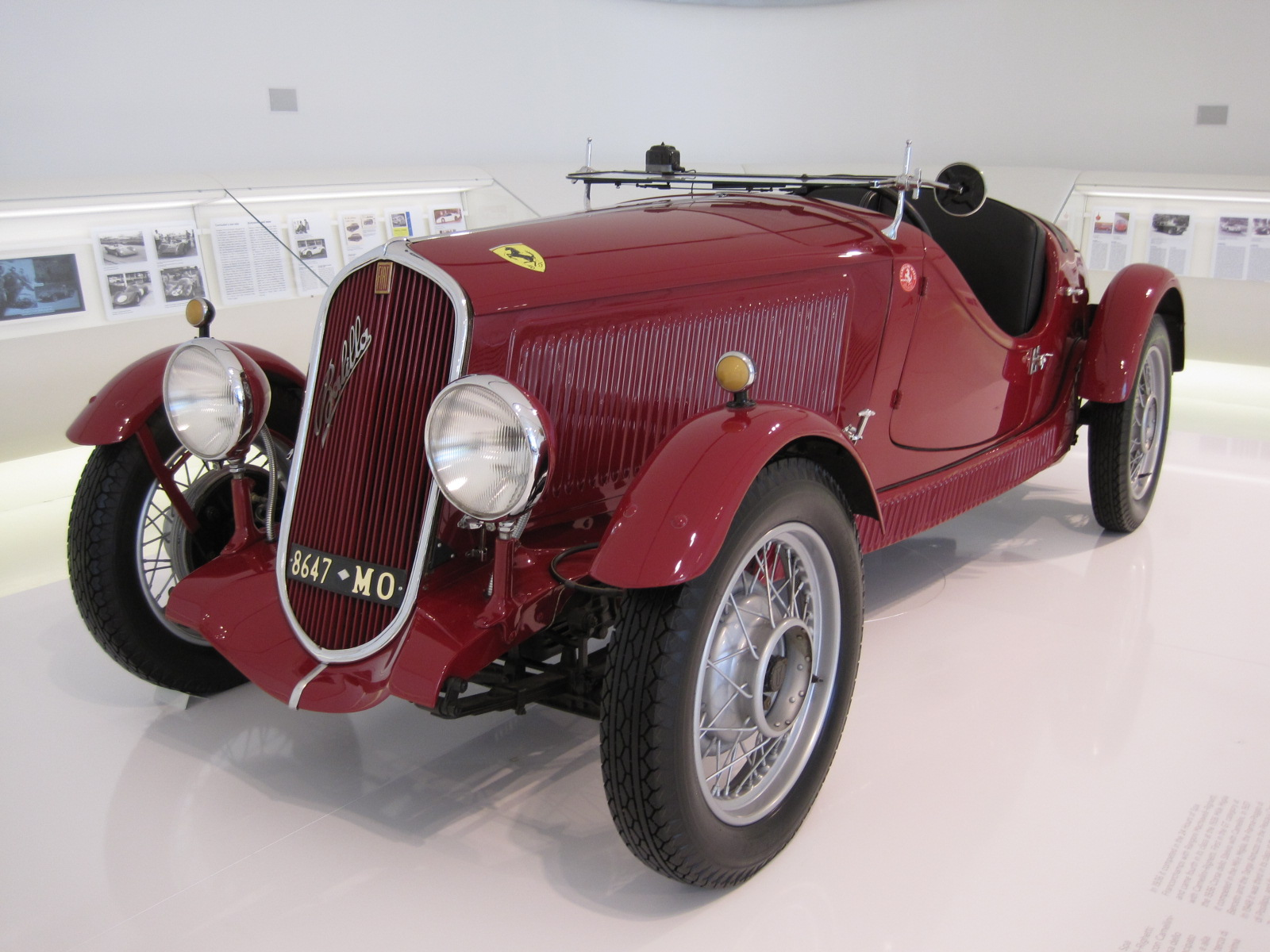
Fiat 508 Balilla Sport 1934

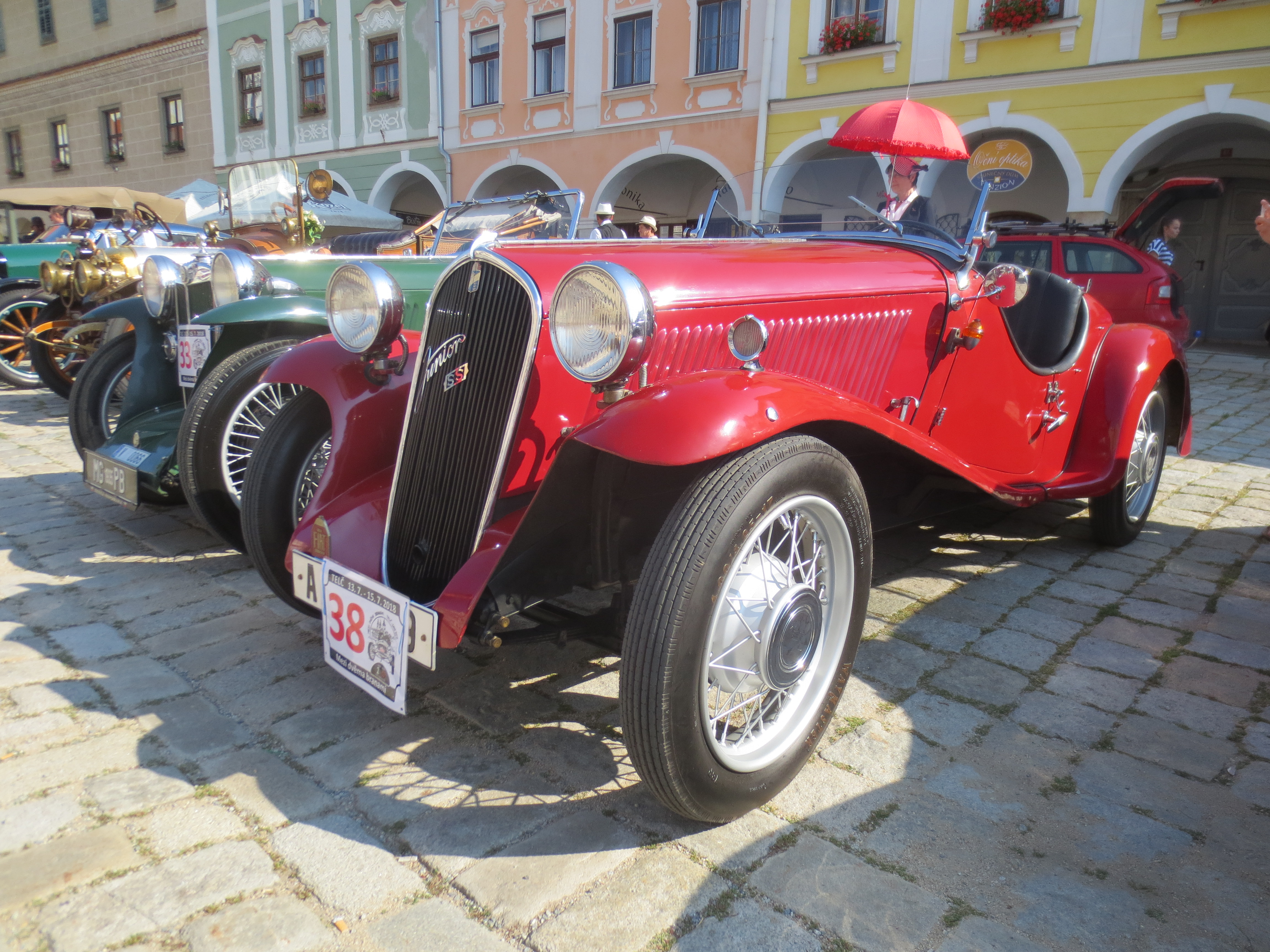
Walter Junior SS - Super Sport (1935)

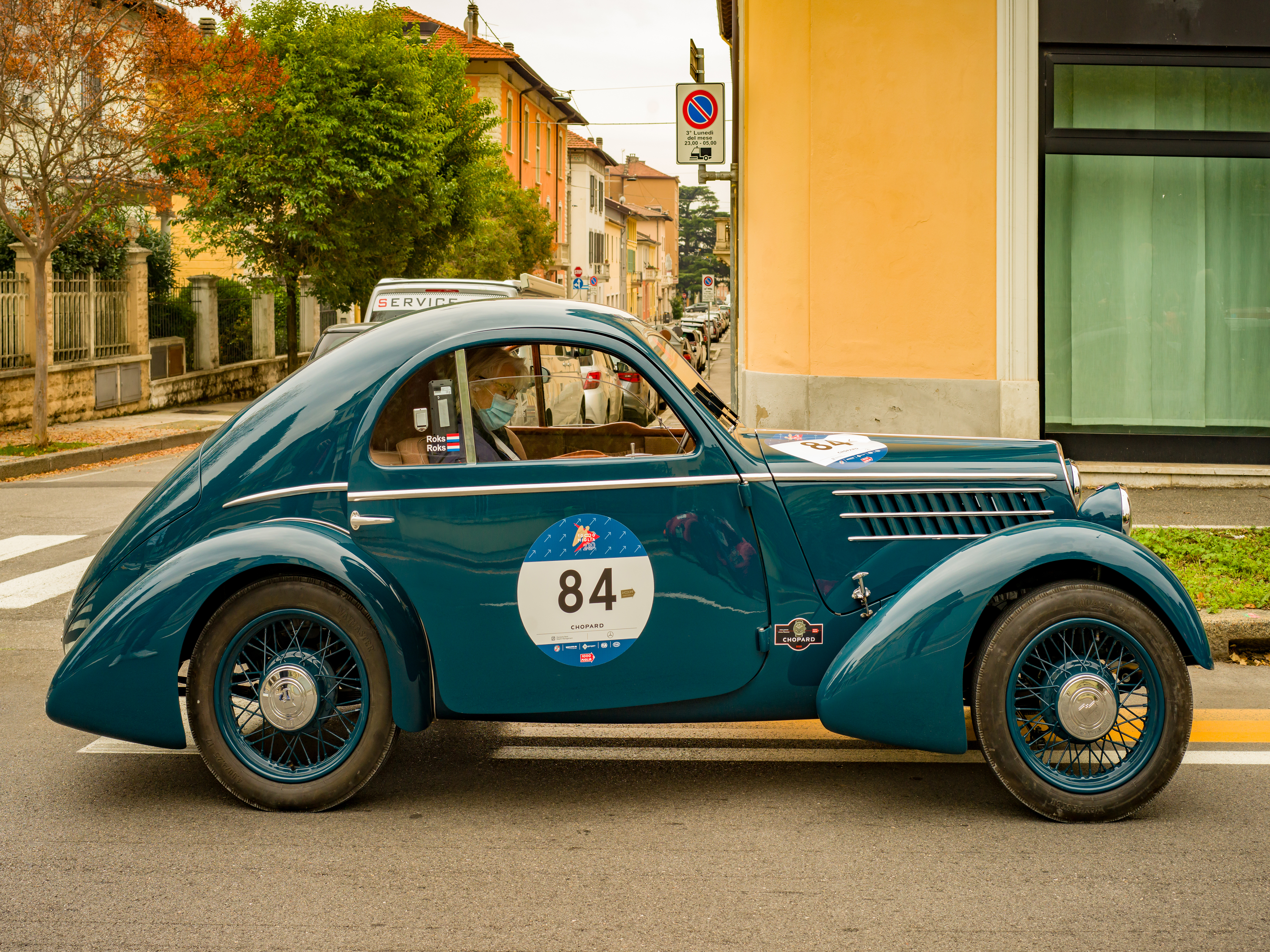
Fiat 508 CS Berlinetta MM (1935)

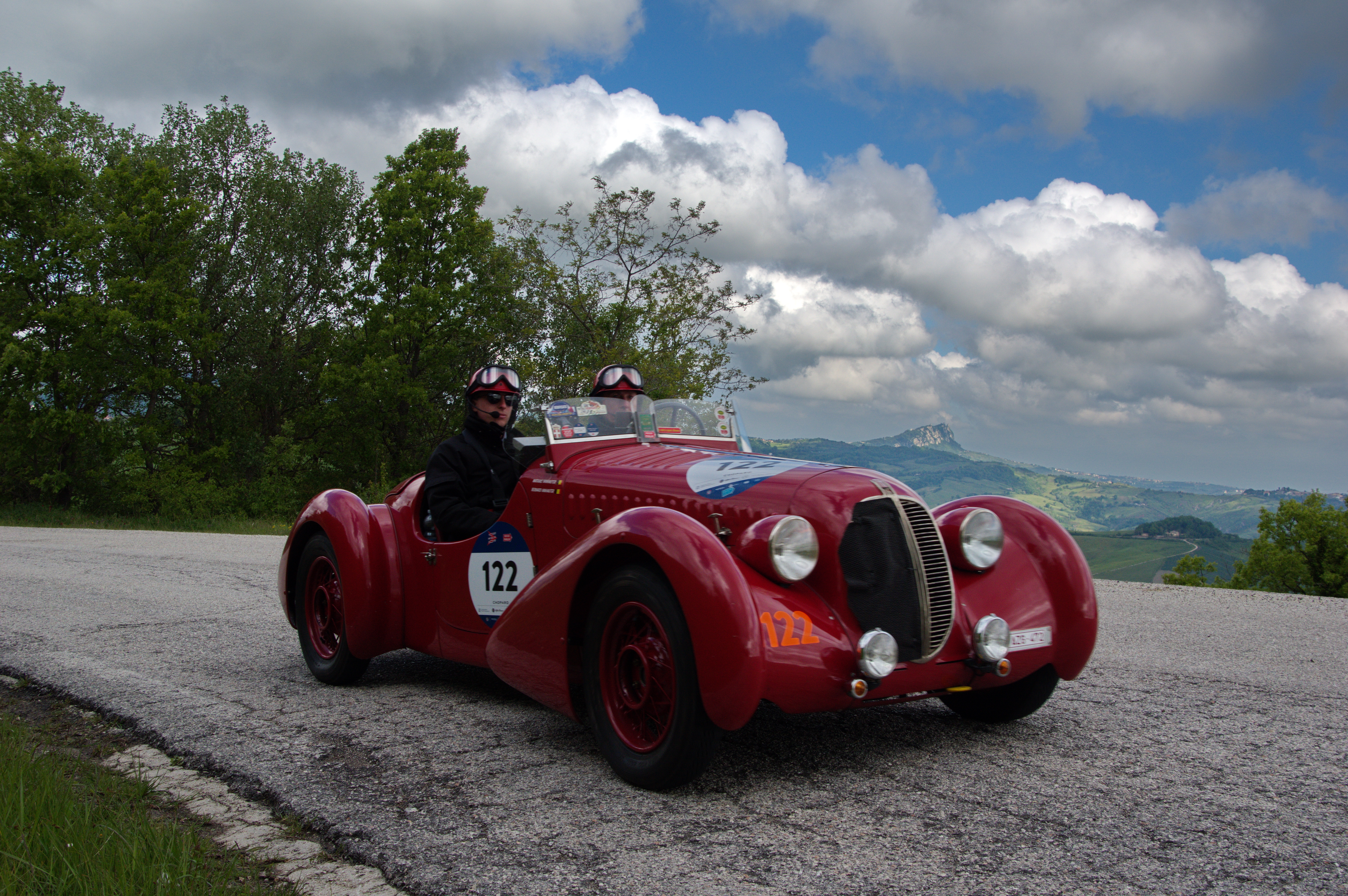
Fiat 508 C Spider speciale (1937)

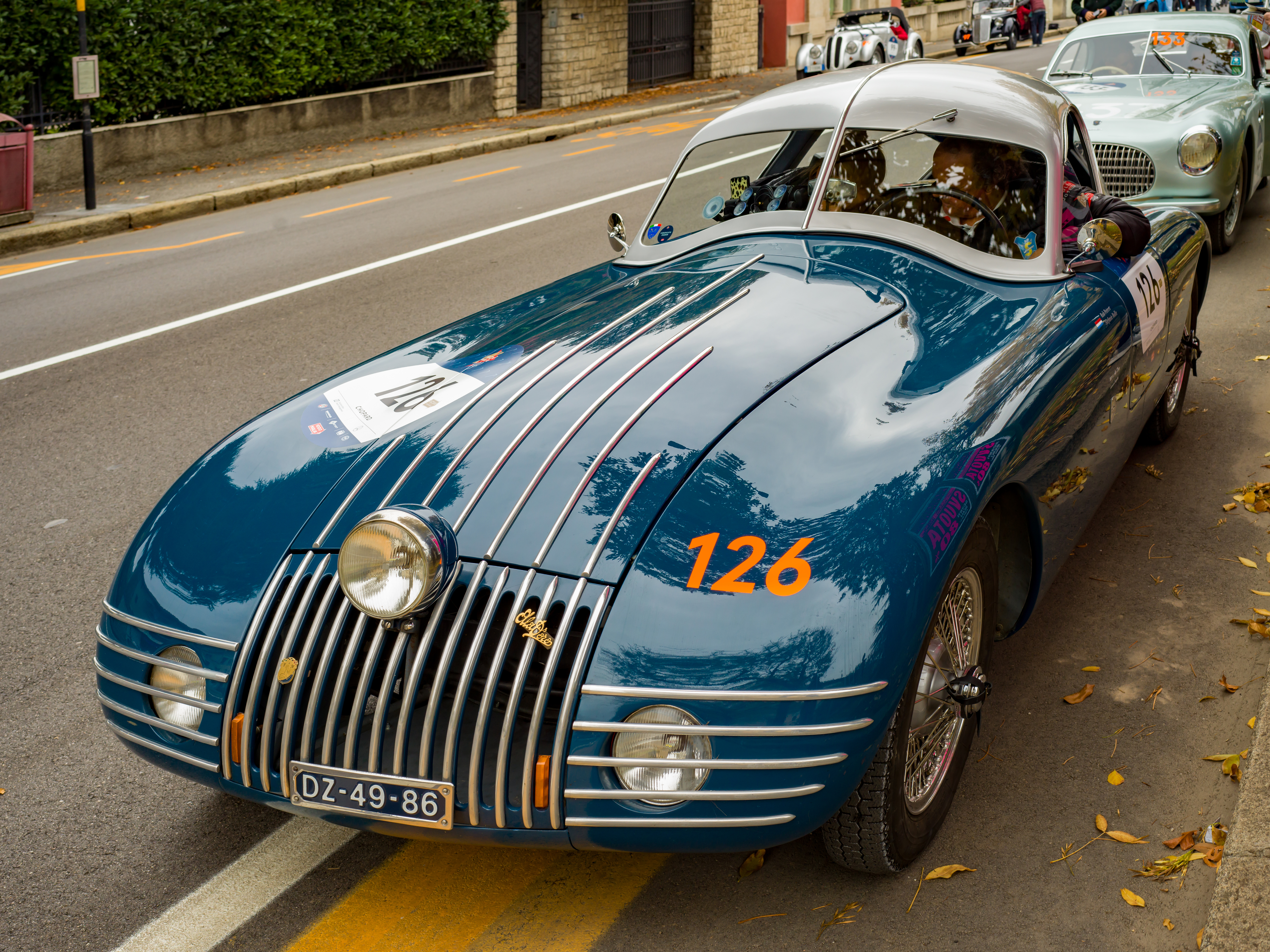
Fiat 508 CS Berlinetta MM (1947)

== Foreign assembly ==
=== Poland ===
As well as being assembled at Turin in Italy, three successive versions of the car were produced in Poland where it was branded as the "Polski-Fiat 508" and priced at 5,400 Zł.

The arrangement was based on an agreement dated 21 September 1932 and provided for the assembly of the car by Centralne Warsztaty Samochodowe in Warsaw. Assembly progressed to full-scale production in 1935 and the 508 became the country's top selling passenger car for a period during the 1930s. There were few paved roads in Poland at this time, and both the chassis and the axles of the car were strengthened, and the suspension was modified, in order to cope with the relatively harsh operating conditions resulting from the quality of the roads and of the Polish winter. 20 hp (15 kW) of power came from the same 995 cc engine as in the Italian car, however, and the Polish cars benefited, in 1935 from the upgrade that in Italy gave birth to the "508B", although the upgraded Polish version was known as the "508 II".

Production was abruptly halted by the outbreak of war and precise production statistics do not survive; but it is apparent that the Polish output of Fiat 508s ran to several - probably many - thousand.

=== Germany ===
In Germany a motor bike manufacturer called NSU Motorenwerke AG had recently been persuaded by the dire state of the economy (and by their bankers) to abandon ambitious plans to become an automobile producer, and to sell their car plant to anyone who could be found to buy it. NSU found Fiat who thereby in 1929 acquired for One Million Marks a nearly new purpose built car plant near Heilbronn. The 508 Balilla was one of the first two models to be built at the plant It was badged as a "Fiat-NSU" between 1934 and 1938, and as an "NSU-Fiat" between 1938 and 1941 (though Fiat's right to use the NSU name on Fiat passenger cars assembled in Germany would 25 years later become the subject of a noisily litigious dispute).

Production was halted by the outbreak of war and precise production statistics are not available, but it is thought that approximately 11,000 Fiat 508s were produced in Germany between 1934 and 1941 of which approximately 6,000, built between 1934 and 1938, were local equivalents of the 508A and the 508B.

=== France ===
The Fiat 508 Balilla was assembled in France under license from Fiat between 1932 and 1937, and is remembered in retrospect as the first Simca-Fiat. However, the "Simca-Fiat" business did not exist until 1934/35, and when, in 1932, French assembly started the car was simply known as a Fiat 6CV. It was assembled in France by a company called SAFAF. "6CV" was a name applied to many cars from different automakers and simply defined the car tax band and thereby the market segment in which the car competed. At this stage the cars were assembled in a small-workshop style factory in Suresnes near Paris. Most of the French auto-makers and their suppliers were based in the Paris region, and it proved practical and cost-effective to source many components and sub-assemblies locally, while taking care to maintain a disparate supplier base of smaller companies in order to avoid over dependence on any supplier and, it was said, lower the risk of abusive copying in France of Fiat component designs.

From the start, the French assembled Fiat 6CV was available as a "berline" (four-door saloon/sedan), a "coach" (two-door saloon/sedan), a "coupé" and a "roadster", and subsequently the range of body variant would be widened further. Power came, as in the Italian-built cars, from a 995 cc side-valve engine for which, initially, maximum power was listed as 20 hp (15 kW) at 3,400 rpm.

In November 1934 production at Suresnes came to an end when Fiat acquired the plant of the recently defunct auto-maker "Donnet", in the west of the country. It was at this point that Fiat funded and created the Société Industrielle de Mécanique et de Carrosserie Automobile (Simca). The move to the more spacious Nanterre facility permitted an increase in volumes which enabled the manufacturer to become one of the country's top tier automakers by the end of the decade. The name "Simca" was now introduced to French customers, the French built Fiat 508 being rebranded as the Simca-Fiat 6CV. In a culture of heightened political awareness and growing polarisation, there was some hostility to things Italian, at least from the French left, and especially in the buildup to Mussolini's Abyssinian invasion. Simca's (originally Italian) boss, Henri Pigozzi, was more attuned than most automobile bosses to the power of skilful marketing, and Simca-Fiat publicity of the period increasingly downplayed the Fiat ownership: by 1936 its new models were being branded simply as Simcas. The Simca-Fiat 6CV nevertheless retained the Balilla engine and other mechanical components, and it continued to look like a Fiat.

The Simca-Fiat 6CV made its last Motor Show appearance in October 1937. By this time three slightly bowed thin chrome stripes had appeared on each side of the bonnet/hood, representing the tail of a comet, and for its final year in production, the car was rebaptised as the "Simca-Fiat 6CV Comète". The list of different body variants produced by Simca in Nanterre extended to eight "different" shapes, though most of the steel body panels would have been common to several different shapes. The eight bodies featured in the 1937 show material were a 2-door "berline" (saloon/sedan), a 4-door "berline", a coupé, a cabriolet, a roadster, a "commerciale" (sharing most of the silhouette of the 2-door "berline" but with an opening tailgate) and a "fourgonette" (panel van). However, the Simca list did not include a "Torpedo" bodied car.

By the time the model was replaced in France by the Simca 8 (based on the next generation of the Fiat 508 Balilla) 26,472 of the cars had been built by Simca in Nanterre or its predecessor company, "SAFAF", in Suresnes.

=== Czechoslovakia ===
The 508 was also produced at Prague-Jinonice by Walter a.s. under designation Walter Junior. Production started in autumn 1932; until 1936, little over one thousand vehicles were built. All Juniors built got the three-speed gearbox. Prices started at 27,500 Kč for the two-door saloon.

== In popular culture ==
Famous Belgian cartoon author André Franquin's goofy hero-without-employment Gaston Lagaffe, uses a Balilla 508 (some say it is the very similar Fiat 509) as a daily transport. Though the car is "customized" with a checkered flag stripe (laboriously cut out of dozens of crossword puzzles), it is a hopeless piece of junk with a wheezy, smoke belching, misfiring engine. Nevertheless, Gaston doesn't seem to care and even "improves" his car with crackpot inventions, generally leading to some disastrous débacle. He generously offers rides to (generally reluctant) office colleagues who invariably regret their accepting, except Gaston's pointy nosed, pony-tailed, bespectacled love interest, Mademoselle Jeanne.

The Balilla 508 was one of the first attempt of mass motorization in Europe, long before the Volkswagen Beetle or the Citroën 2CV though its customers were more lower middle and middle class than working classes, it was a quite desired (and often stolen) item in 1930s Italy. It was such an emblematic car that a specially dedicated song (or better said dozens variations of an initial song) was created at the time of its launch.

The song is a burlesque and almost surrealist ballad called "La Balilla"about a small time cottage industrialist who sells soap, bleach and washing powder on town markets and makes a tidy income out of it, enabling him to buy a top of the range Balilla with an exotic option: a special custom upholstery made out of eel skin. He instantly triggers envy and jealousy around him; his sisters, brothers, neighbours, and relatives (and even a picturesque mob of passers-by) start literally to eat the car bit by bit. In the Sicilian and Neapolitan versions the car is rather stolen bit by bit, either by petty thugs or by seemingly respectable people acting just the same. Most rhymes are matching with some unlikely part of the car, the doctor eating the radiator or the brother ill with diabetes eating the magnete (magneto). In the end the unlucky motorist is left with almost nothing, a handful of nuts or even the smoke from the exhaust pipe.

There is a Lombard version of the song (considered the original one as Fiat is based in Torino - which makes little sense, as Torino is in Piedmont rather than Lombardy), but there are many other versions in various Italian dialects from Roma, Sicily, Abruzzo and others. Such a variety of versions mirror the wide diffusion and popularity of the Balilla 508 in the 1930s.
