= RWD 22 =

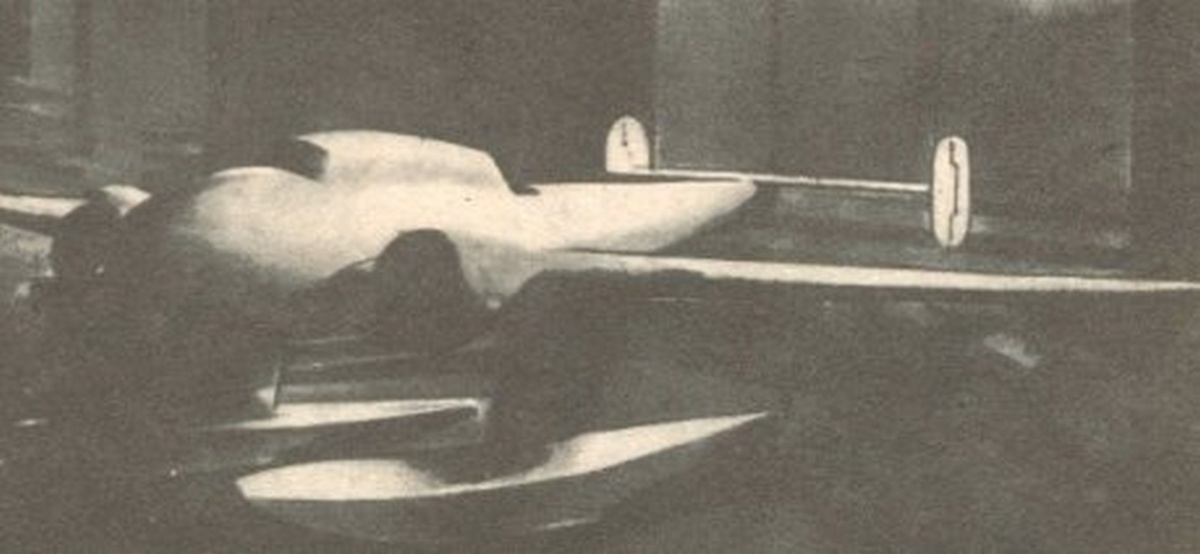
- RWD 22 wind tunnel model

General information
- Type: Torpedo bomber and naval reconnaissance floatplane
- National origin: Poland
- Manufacturer: RWD (Stanisław Rogalski, Stanisław Wigura and Jerzy Drzewiecki)
- Designer: Leszek Dulęba and Andrzej Anczutin
- Number built: 0

RWD 22 was a Polish twin-engine torpedo bomber and naval reconnaissance floatplane design. Developed by Leszek Dulęba and Andrzej Anczutin of Doświadczalne Warsztaty Lotnicze (Experimental Aeronautical Workshops, DWL) in 1939, the project was to be developed under the brand of the RWD design bureau. The outbreak of World War II interrupted the design and it never left the planning stage.

== Design and development ==
In late 1930s the Polish Navy sought a replacement for the ageing R-XIIIter and Lublin R-VIII. The new design was to replace those aircraft in both the torpedo bomber and close-range reconnaissance roles. Design of the RWD 22 started in October 1938 and by January 1939 the basic three projects were ready, each with different engine and armament configuration, but with a similar silhouette. The first version was to be equipped with a German-built Argus As-10c with 177 kilowatts (237 hp) of power and would carry up to 200 kilograms (440 lb) of bombs. The second variant was equipped with second generation Walter Minor 12-JMR with a projected power of 243 kilowatts (326 hp) and was to carry 300 kilograms (660 lb) of bombs. The third and final version was to be equipped with a Polish-built third generation 316 kilowatts (424 hp) PZL G-1620B Mors II engine, already being used with the RWD-14 Czapla. Alternatively, American Pratt & Whitney R-985 Wasp Junior SB could also be used. A land-based version of the aircraft was also being considered under a separate designation RWD 24. It was most likely to receive two Gnome-Rhône 14M Mars engines of 700 horsepower (520 kW).

In the summer of 1939 the third, heaviest variant was chosen by the Polish Navy and a wooden mock-up was completed for aerodynamic trials. The designers also received 150.000 Polish złoty for the prototype, which was to be completed by mid-1940. The first serial run was to be started in 1940 and by early 1942 the Naval Air Squadron was to receive the first 12 planes. However, the Nazi and Soviet invasion of Poland and the outbreak of World War II interrupted further works.

== Specifications (RWD 22 estimated) ==
Data from Polish Aircraft 1893–1939

General characteristics

- Crew: 3
- Length: 13.8 m (45 ft 3 in)
- Wingspan: 18 m (59 ft 1 in)
- Height: 4.2 m (13 ft 9 in)
- Wing area: 40 m^{2} (430 sq ft)
- Empty weight: 2,600 kg (5,732 lb)
- Gross weight: 4,300 kg (9,480 lb) training and reconnaissance
- Gross weight torpedo bomber: 4,620 kg (10,185.4 lb)
- Powerplant: 2 × P.Z.L. G.1620B Mors B 9-cyl. air-cooled radial piston engine, 350 kW (470 hp) each
- Propellers: 3-bladed Hamilton/P.Z.L. variable pitch metal propellers

Performance

- Maximum speed: 290 km/h (180 mph, 160 kn) at 1,500 m (4,900 ft)
- Cruise speed: 250 km/h (160 mph, 130 kn)
- Alighting speed: 93 km/h (58 mph)
- Range: 1,100 km (680 mi, 590 nmi)
- Ferry range: 2,530 km (1,570 mi, 1,370 nmi)
- Service ceiling: 5,500 m (18,000 ft)
- Time to altitude: 1,000 m (3,300 ft) in 4 minutes
- Wing loading: 108 kg/m^{2} (22 lb/sq ft)
- Power/mass: 0.138 kW/kg (0.084 hp/lb)
