= Walter Minor 12 =

1930s Czech piston aircraft engine

Minor 12
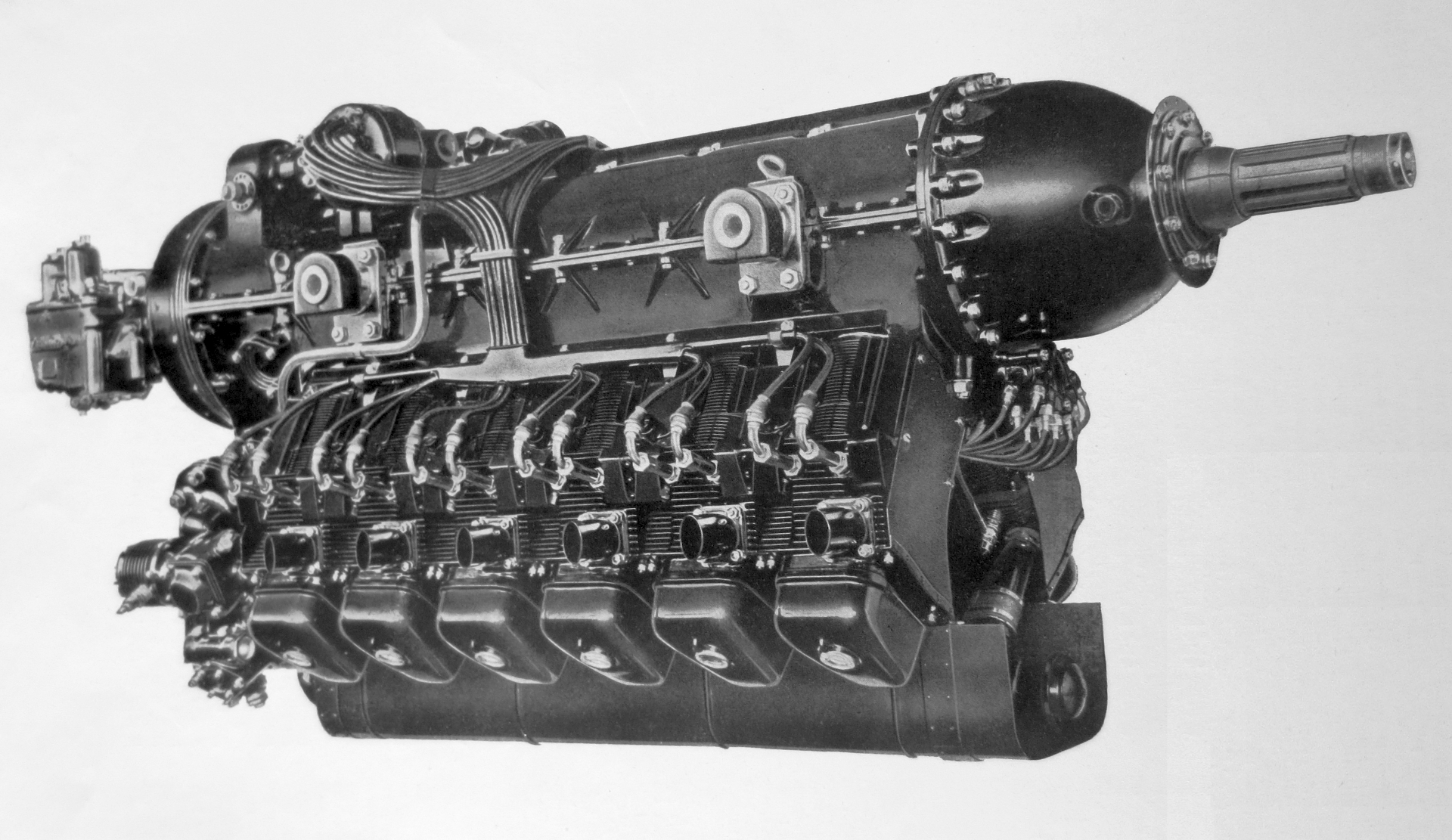
- Type: V-12 piston aero engine
- National origin: Czechoslovakia
- Manufacturer: Walter Aircraft Engines
- First run: 1937

The Walter Minor 12 was a 12-cylinder, air-cooled, V engine for aircraft use built in Czechoslovakia by Walter Aircraft Engines in the late-1930s.

== Design and development ==
Sharing the bore and stroke dimensions of the Walter Minor and the layout of the Sagitta this engine was first run in 1937. It appeared at the Paris Air Show in 1938 along with other engines from the Walter range. The engine passed a type test in January 1939 and was considered for an unproduced aircraft project, the Polish RWD 22, but due to the outbreak of World War II development and production of this engine did not continue.

== Applications ==
- RWD 22 (intended)

== Specifications (Minor 12 I-MR) ==
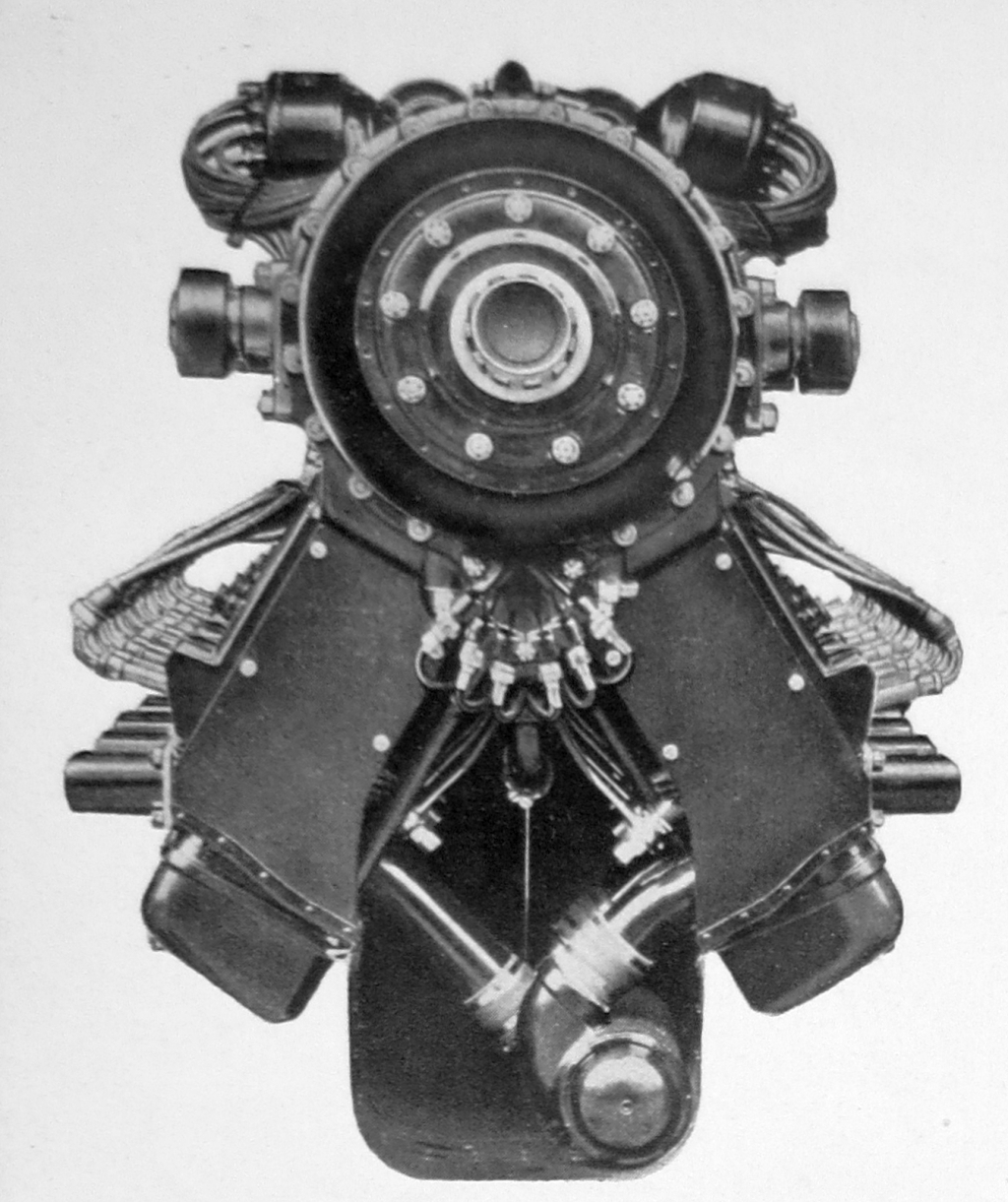
Front view

Data from Československá letadla I (1918-1945)

=== General characteristics ===
- Type: 12-cylinder inverted 60° V piston engine
- Bore: 105 mm (4.13 in)
- Stroke: 115 mm (4.53 in)
- Displacement: 11.95 L (729 cu in)
- Length: 1,925 mm (75.8 in)
- Width: 510 mm (20.1 in)
- Height: 805 mm (31.7 in)
- Dry weight: 325 kg (717 lb)

=== Components ===
- Valvetrain: Overhead valve, two valves per cylinder
- Supercharger: Rear mounted, crankshaft driven
- Fuel system: Zenith carburettor with automatic mixture control
- Fuel type: 85 octane petrol
- Oil system: Pressure fed
- Cooling system: Air-cooled
- Reduction gear: Farman gear, 3:2 reduction ratio

=== Performance ===
- Power output: 305 kW (409 hp) at 2,700 rpm (takeoff power)
- Compression ratio: 6.2:1

== See also ==
Related development

- Walter Minor
- Walter Sagitta

Comparable engines

- Argus As 410
- Ranger V-770

Related lists

- List of aircraft engines
