= Walter Polaris =

1930s Czech piston aircraft engine

Polaris
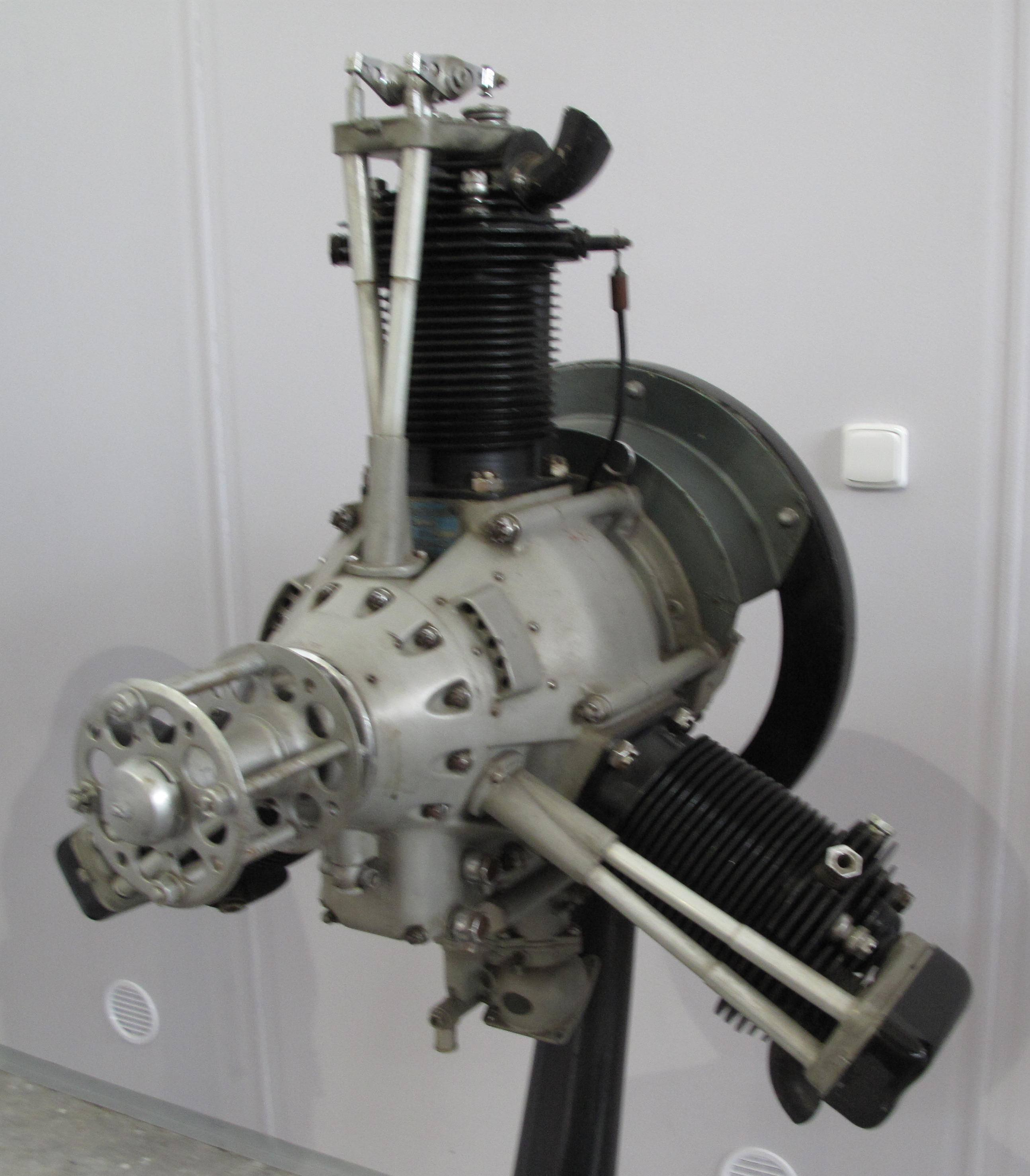
- Walter Polaris
- Type: Radial aero engine
- National origin: Czechoslovakia
- Manufacturer: Walter Aircraft Engines

The Walter Polaris was a Czechoslovak three-cylinder, air-cooled radial engine for powering light aircraft that was developed in the 1930s.

== Applications ==
- Letov Š-39
- Rearwin Junior

== Engines on display ==
A preserved example of the Walter Polaris engine is on display at the following museum:

- Prague Aviation Museum, Kbely

== Specifications (Polaris) ==
=== General characteristics ===
- Type: 3-cylinder radial piston engine
- Bore: 105 mm (4.13 in)
- Stroke: 120 mm (4.72 in)
- Displacement: 3.12 L (190 cu in)
- Length: 708 mm (27.9 in)
- Diameter: 926 mm (36.5 in)
- Dry weight: 72 kg (159 lb)

=== Components ===
- Valvetrain: One intake and one exhaust valve per cylinder
- Fuel system: Carburettor
- Fuel type: Petrol
- Cooling system: Air-cooled

=== Performance ===
- Power output: 44 kW (59 hp) at 1,900 rpm
- Compression ratio: 5.15:1

== See also ==
Comparable engines

- Blackburne Thrush

Related lists

- List of aircraft engines
