= Walter NZ 85 =

1920s Czech piston aircraft engine

NZ 85
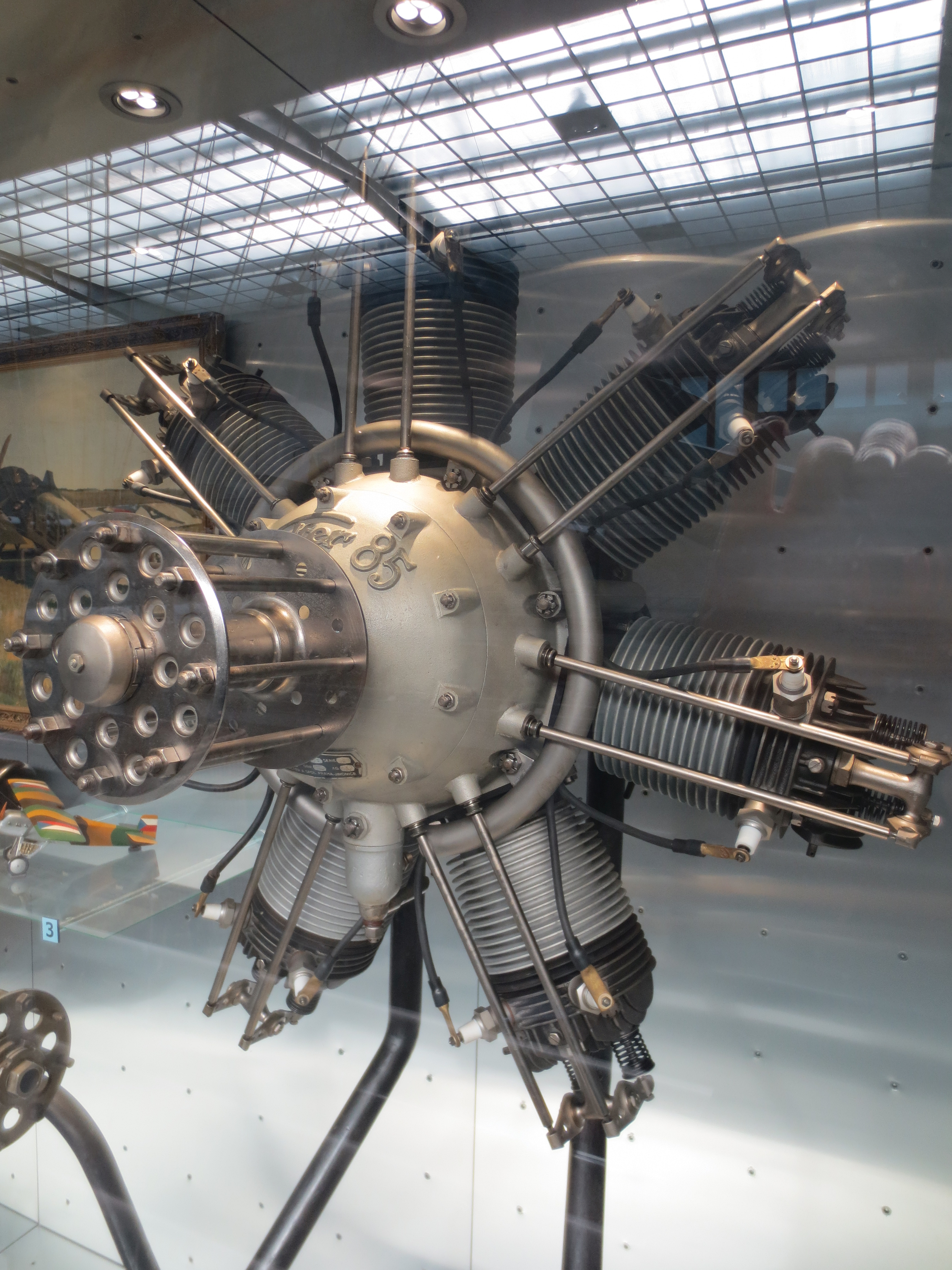
- NZ 85 on display at the National Technical Museum (Prague)
- Type: Radial aero engine
- National origin: Czechoslovakia
- Manufacturer: Walter Aircraft Engines
- First run: 1926
- Number built: 50
- Developed from: Walter NZ 60
- Developed into: Walter Venus

The Walter NZ 85 was a seven-cylinder, air-cooled, radial engine for aircraft use built in Czechoslovakia by Walter Aircraft Engines in the late-1920s.

== Design and development ==
Using common cylinders and parts from the earlier Walter NZ 60 (Novák-Zeithammer) engine the NZ 85 and the nine-cylinder NZ 120 were designed together. Lightened and tuned developments were known as the NZ 90 and NZ 95.

== Applications ==
- Aero A.34
- Avia BH-20
- Avia BH-29
- Breda Ba.15
- Couzinet 30 (intended application)
- Gribovsky G-8
- Hopfner HS-8/29
- IMAM Ro.5
- Letov Š-118
- Orta-Saint Hubert G.1
- Savoia-Marchetti S.56
- Shavrov Sh-1

== Specifications (NZ 85) ==
Data from Němeček.

=== General characteristics ===
- Type: Seven-cylinder radial piston engine
- Bore: 105 mm (4.13 in)
- Stroke: 120 mm (4.72 in)
- Displacement: 7.27 L (444 cu in)
- Length: 741 mm (29.2 in)
- Diameter: 990 mm (39.0 in)
- Dry weight: 125 kg (276 lb)

=== Components ===
- Fuel system: Zenith carburettor
- Cooling system: Air-cooled

=== Performance ===
- Power output: 74 kW (99 hp)

== See also ==
Comparable engines

- Armstrong Siddeley Genet Major

Related lists

- List of aircraft engines
