= LKL (disambiguation) =

LKL or Lkl may refer to:

- Lietuvos Krepšinio Lyga, the Lithuanian Basketball League
- Larry King Live, a U.S. TV talk and interview show
- Lubelski Klub Lotniczy, a Polish airplane company, maker of the LKL I, LKL II, LKL IV
- Lakselv Airport, Banak (IATA airport code LKL), Norway
- Lakeland (Amtrak station) (station code LKL), Florida, USA
- LKL, the ship prefix for the Lithuanian Naval Force
