= Albert A-20 =

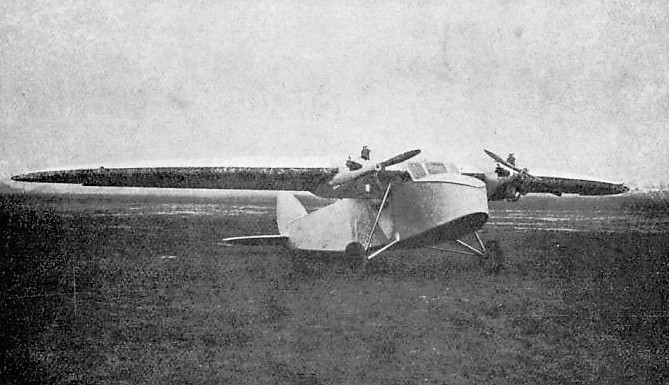

General information
- Type: Mailplane
- National origin: France
- Manufacturer: Avions Albert
- Number built: 1

History
- First flight: November 1929

The Albert A-20 was a French twin-engined monoplane designed for postal work in 1929. Only one was built.

== Design and development ==
The Albert A-20 had a cantilever, one-piece, thick section, high wing with a convex leading edge and a straight, unswept trailing edge, similar to the wings of the Albert TE.1 and Albert A-10. Narrow-chord ailerons occupied all the trailing edge. The wing structure included multiple spruce and plywood box-spars and variable thickness ply skin.

It was powered by two wing-mounted 45 kW (60 hp) Walter NZ 60 five-cylinder radial engines with their mountings enclosed in streamlined aluminium fairings. Fuel tanks were in the wings.

The A-20's fuselage was flat-sided, with a rectangular section throughout, though in plan the extreme nose was rounded as its section decreased. It was wooden, with four longerons and plywood skin. The cockpit was under the wing with a windscreen at the leading edge providing good views ahead and below. There were two side-by-side seats with opening side-windows, the pilot on the left and navigator on the right. A windowed starboard-side door gave access both to the cockpit and to an under-wing cabin behind the crew which could accommodate two passengers or 150 kg (330 lb) of mail. It was lit by a large window opposite the door.

Like the wing, the empennage was wood framed and ply covered. In plan the horizontal tail was roughly elliptical, with an in-flight adjustable tailplane and single-piece elevator. The fin had a quadrantal profile and carried a near-semicircular unbalanced rudder.

The A-20 had fixed, conventional landing gear, with a track of 3.18 m (10 ft 5 in). Each mainwheel, fitted with a brake, was on a V-strut hinged from the lower longeron, almost horizontal on the ground, with a long oleo strut to the upper longeron. The tailskid was a steel spring.

The exact date of the A-20's first flight is not known but several flights had been made by early December 1929, piloted by both Edouard Albert and Vancaudenberg. They reported a stable and well-behaved aircraft. Despite this, only one was built and there are no new reports on the A-20 beyond 1929 in the contemporary French literature.

== Specifications ==
Data from Les Ailes, December 1929 Performance figures calculated.

General characteristics

- Crew: 2
- Capacity: 2 (if used as a passenger transport)
- Length: 8.97 m (29 ft 5 in)
- Wingspan: 15.0 m (49 ft 3 in)
- Height: 2.90 m (9 ft 6 in)
- Wing area: 25 m^{2} (270 sq ft)
- Empty weight: 835 kg (1,841 lb)
- Gross weight: 1,255 kg (2,767 lb)
- Powerplant: 2 × Walter NZ 60 5-cylinder air-cooled radial piston engines, 45 kW (60 hp) each
- Propellers: 2-bladed, 2 m (6 ft 7 in) diameter wooden

Performance

- Maximum speed: 175 km/h (109 mph, 94 kn)
- Landing speed: 70 km/h (43 mph; 38 kn)
- Range: 900 km (560 mi, 490 nmi)
- Service ceiling: 5,000 m (16,000 ft)
