= Avia BH-10 =

Aerobatic sports plane

BH-10
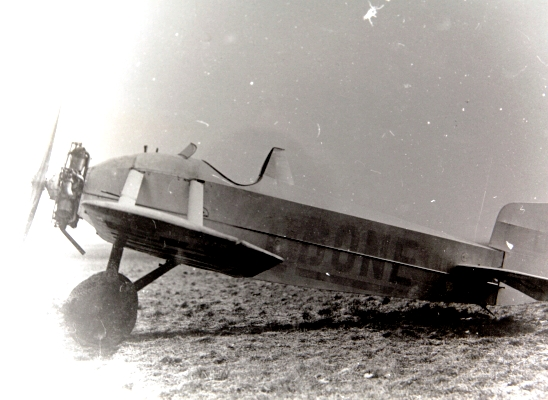

General information
- Type: Sports plane
- Manufacturer: Avia
- Designer: Pavel Beneš and Miroslav Hajn
- Number built: 21

History
- First flight: 1924

The Avia BH-10 was a single-seat aerobatic sports plane built in Czechoslovakia in 1924, based on the Avia BH-9, which was in turn developed from the BH-5 and BH-1. It was easily visually distinguished from the BH-9 by the tall anti-roll pylon added behind the open cockpit in order to protect the pilot in the event that the aircraft flipped over or crashed while inverted. 21 copies of the aircraft were built, 10 of which were bought by the Czechoslovak Army as a training aircraft and operated under the designation B.10.

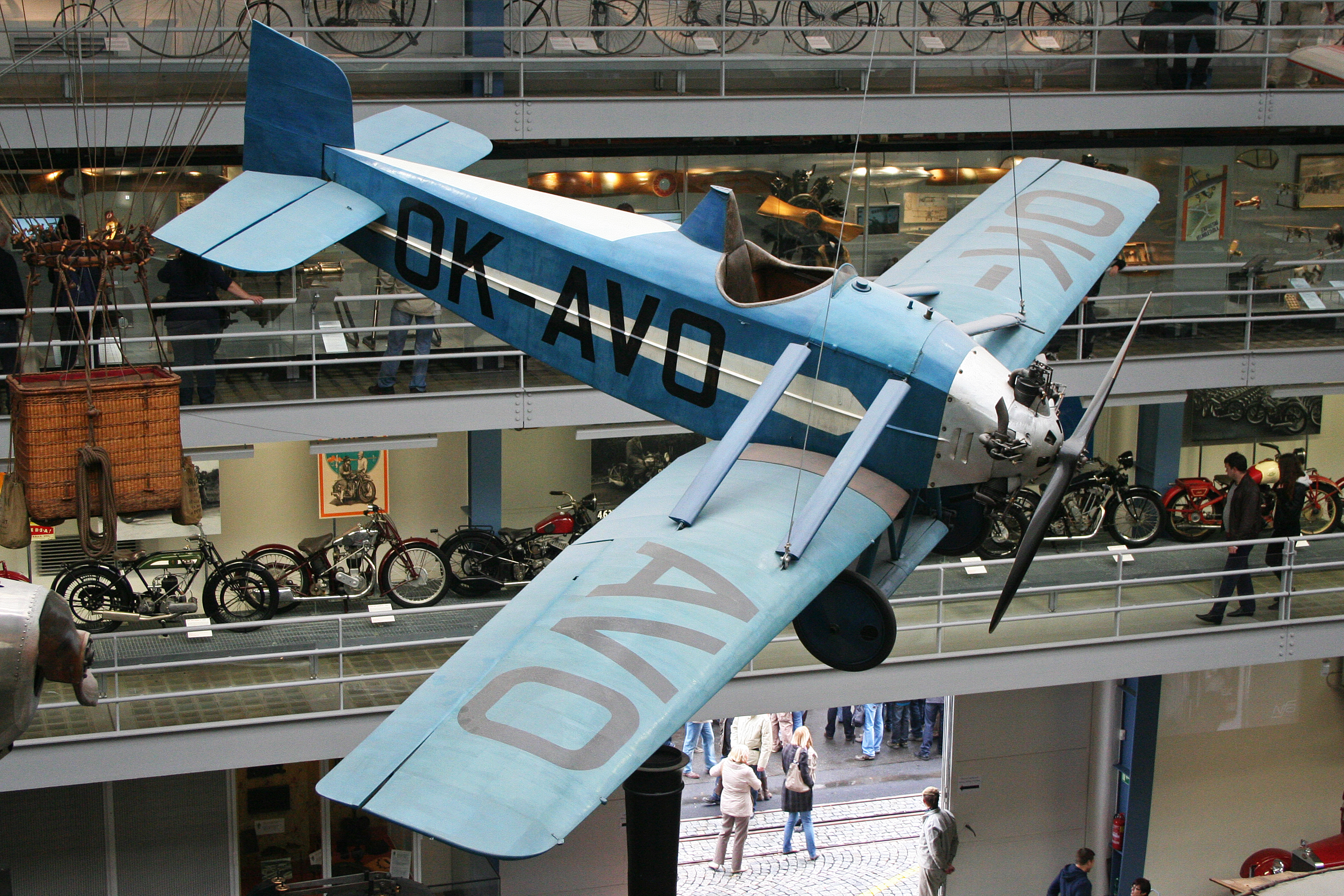
BH-10 in the National Technical Museum, Prague

== Specifications ==
General characteristics

- Crew: one pilot
- Length: 5.42 m (17 ft 9 in)
- Wingspan: 8.8 m (28 ft 10 in)
- Wing area: 9.8 m^{2} (105 sq ft)
- Empty weight: 288 kg (635 lb)
- Gross weight: 414 kg (913 lb)
- Powerplant: 1 × Walter NZ 60 , 45 kW (60 hp)

Performance

- Maximum speed: 160 km/h (100 mph, 87 kn)
- Range: 480 km (300 mi, 260 nmi)
- Service ceiling: 4,500 m (14,800 ft)
- Rate of climb: 3.3 m/s (656 ft/min)

== See also ==
Related development BH-5 – BH-9 – BH-11 – BH-12
