= A134 =

A134 may refer to:

- A134 road (England), a road in England
- Aero A.134, a Czechoslovak biplane
