= Avia BH-9 =

BH-9
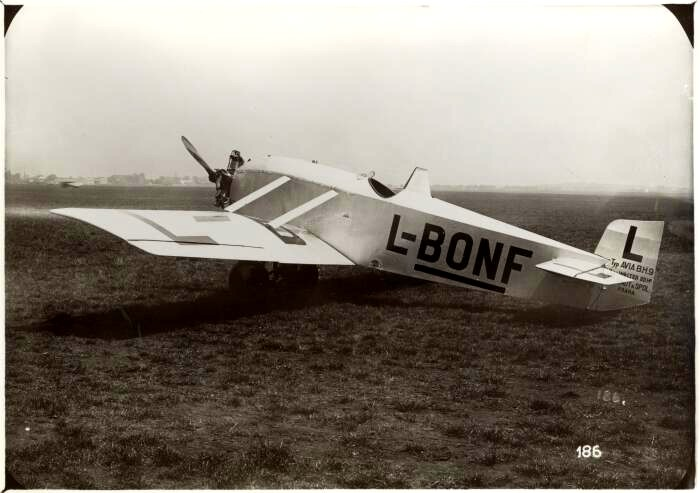

General information
- Type: Sports plane
- Manufacturer: Avia
- Designer: Pavel Beneš and Miroslav Hajn
- Number built: 11

History
- Introduction date: 1923
- First flight: 25 November 1923

The Avia BH-9 was a twin-seat sports plane built in Czechoslovakia in 1923, based on the BH-5. As with other developments in the BH-1 lineage, the BH-9 was a low-wing braced monoplane that accommodated the pilot and passenger in tandem, open cockpits. The BH-9's structure was strengthened to allow the use of a higher-power engine than in its predecessors, and for the first time, this was a domestically produced powerplant. Although built as a twin-seat aircraft at least one (registration L-BONF - see picture) was converted to a single-seater.

The Czechoslovak Army showed interest in it as a trainer and liaison aircraft, and ordered ten examples under the designation B.9.

A B.9 won the 1925 Coppa d'Italia air race, and the following year, one was flown on a 1,800 km (1,100 mi) circuit Prague-Paris-Prague with an average speed of 131.2 km/h (82 mph).

== Specifications ==
Data from Monografie: Avia BH-9

General characteristics

- Crew: one pilot
- Capacity: one passenger
- Length: 6.64 m (21 ft 9 in)
- Wingspan: 9.72 m (31 ft 11 in)
- Height: 2.53 m (8 ft 4 in)
- Wing area: 13.6 m^{2} (146 sq ft)
- Empty weight: 345 kg (761 lb)
- Gross weight: 552 kg (1,217 lb)
- Powerplant: 1 × Walter NZ 60 radial , 45 kW (60 hp)

Performance

- Maximum speed: 157 km/h (98 mph, 85 kn)
- Cruise speed: 120–125 km/h (75–78 mph, 65–67 kn)
- Range: 470 km (290 mi, 250 nmi)
- Service ceiling: 4,000 m (13,000 ft)

== See also ==
Related development

- BH-5
- BH-10
- BH-11
- BH-12
