= Avia BH-12 =

BH-12
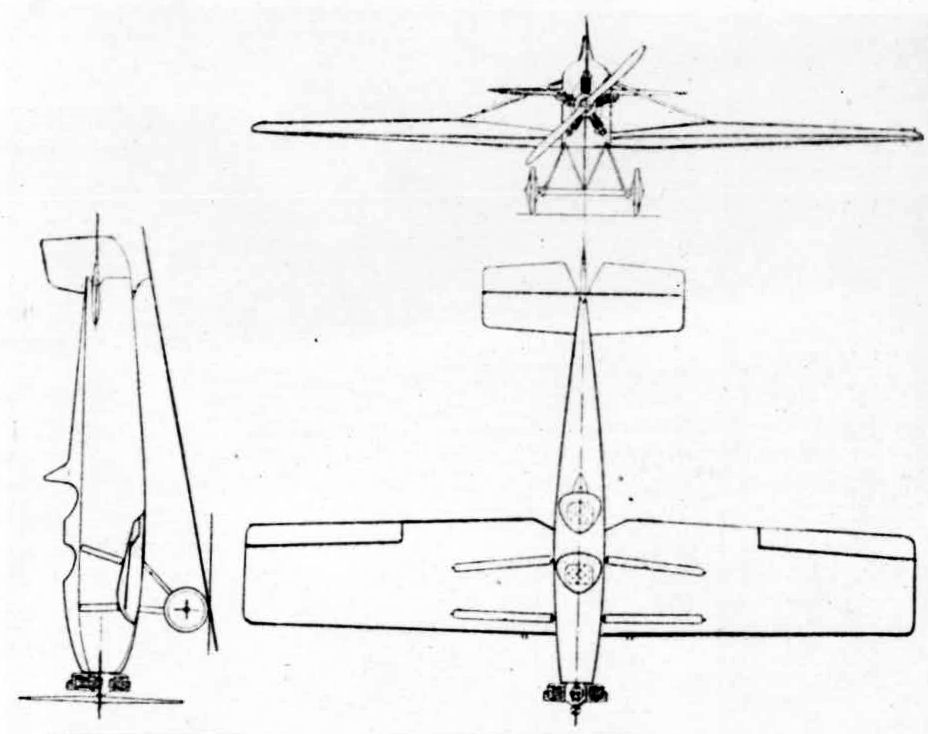
- Avia BH-12 3-view drawing from NACA-TM-37

General information
- Type: Sports plane
- Manufacturer: Avia
- Designer: Pavel Beneš and Miroslav Hajn
- Number built: 1

History
- First flight: 1924

The Avia BH-12 was a two-seat sport aircraft built in Czechoslovakia in 1924, the final development of the Avia BH-9 family that had its roots in Avia's first aircraft design, the BH-1. It was a low-wing, braced monoplane intended for sports flying, and featured a redesigned wing that could be folded to allow the aircraft to be towed by road. The wing pivoted around its spar and then folded back, flat against the fuselage sides.

== Specifications ==
General characteristics

- Crew: one pilot
- Capacity: one passenger
- Length: 6.34 m (20 ft 10 in)
- Wingspan: 9.77 m (32 ft 1 in)
- Wing area: 13.6 m^{2} (146 sq ft)
- Empty weight: 320 kg (705 lb)
- Gross weight: 550 kg (1,213 lb)
- Powerplant: 1 × Walter NZ 60 , 45 kW (60 hp)

Performance

- Maximum speed: 150 km/h (94 mph, 82 kn)
- Range: 520 km (324 mi, 282 nmi)
- Service ceiling: 5,000 m (16,400 ft)
- Rate of climb: 3.3 m/s (660 ft/min)

== See also ==
Related development

- BH-5
- BH-9
- BH-10
- BH-11
