= Hopfner HS-8/29 =

Utility Aircraft

HS-8/29
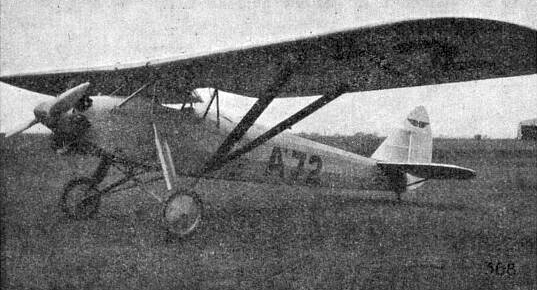
- Hopfner HS-8/29 with Walter NZ-85

General information
- Type: Utility aircraft
- National origin: Austria
- Manufacturer: Hopfner
- Designer: Theodor Hopfner
- Number built: 16

History
- First flight: 1928

The Hopfner HS-8/29 was a utility aircraft built in Austria in the late 1920s based on the Hopfner HS-5/28. It used a modernised version of its predecessor's airframe, being a conventional, parasol-wing monoplane with seating for two occupants in tandem, open cockpits. The landing gear was of fixed, tailskid type with divided main units. The first prototype used the same Walter NZ 85 engine that the later HS-5/28s had used, but this was followed by 14 production examples with Siemens engines, and a single prototype with a de Havilland Gipsy III.

== Variants ==
- HS-8/29 - version with Walter Venus, NZ 85 or Siemens Sh 14 engine (15 built)
- HS-8/29a - version with NZ 85 engine (1 built)
- HS-8/32 - HS-8/29a re-designated.

== Specifications (HS-8/29 - Walter Venus engine) ==
Data from Jane's all the World's Aircraft 1931

General characteristics

- Crew: 2
- Length: 7.7 m (25 ft 3 in)
- Wingspan: 11.26 m (36 ft 11 in)
- Width: 3.1 m (10 ft 2 in) folded
- Height: 2.4 m (7 ft 10 in)
- Wing area: 18 m^{2} (190 sq ft)
- Empty weight: 480 kg (1,058 lb)
- Gross weight: 780 kg (1,720 lb)
- Powerplant: 1 × Walter Venus 7-cylinder air-cooled radial piston engine, 82 kW (110 hp)
- Propellers: 2-bladed wooden fixed-pitch propeller

Performance

- Maximum speed: 145 km/h (90 mph, 78 kn) *Landing speed: 65 km/h (40 mph; 35 kn)
- Cruise speed: 155 km/h (96 mph, 84 kn)
- Range: 550 km (340 mi, 300 nmi)
- Time to altitude: 1,000 m (3,300 ft) in 7 minutes 30 seconds
- Wing loading: 41.7 kg/m^{2} (8.5 lb/sq ft)
- Power/mass: 9.4 kg/kW (15.4 lb/hp)
