= Albert A-10 =

Four-seat French transport aircraft

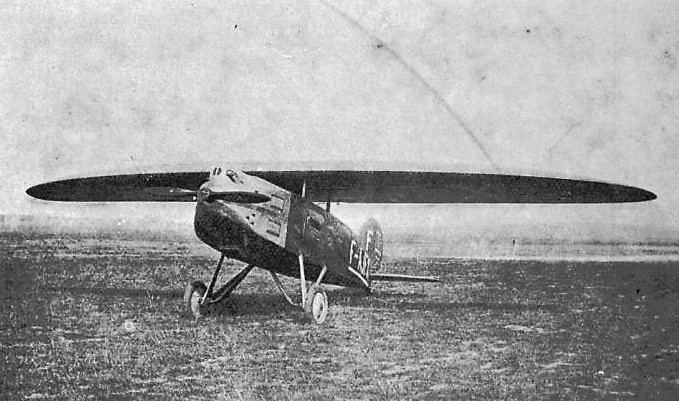

General information
- Type: Transport aircraft or air ambulance
- National origin: France
- Manufacturer: Avions Albert
- Number built: 2/3

History
- First flight: c. October 1929

The Albert A-10 was a four-seat French transport aircraft which could be rapidly converted into an air ambulance. Two or three examples were built between 1929 and 1932, using at least two different engines, but neither variant reached production.

== Design and development ==
The Albert A-10 had a cantilever, one-piece parasol wing of thick section mounted on four short, vertical struts from the fuselage. The wing was unusual in plan, with a convex leading edge and a straight, unswept trailing edge, rather like that of Albert's earlier Albert TE.1 parasol winged single seater. Narrow-chord ailerons occupied all the trailing edge. The wing structure included multiple spruce and plywood box-spars and ply skin.

The Albert 10 was powered by a 75 kW (100 hp) Hispano-Suiza 6Pa six-cylinder, liquid cooled inline engine, though Salmson or Lorraine radial engines could also be fitted using a different mounting. There was a fire wall at the rear of the engine. The Hispano was cooled with a rectangular, shuttered radiator under the nose and there were twin fuel tanks in the wing with dump valves for emergencies.

Behind the engine the wooden fuselage was rectangular in section and built around four longerons and frames. A windowed cabin under the wing had side-by-side seats for two passengers or, in air ambulance configuration, one seat and a stretcher side by side for patient and medic. The cabin could also be configured to carry freight. The pilot's open cockpit was behind the cabin and just behind the trailing edge of the wing. A second seat to the pilot's right, equipped with dual control, could accommodate either a co-pilot or another passenger.

The structure of the Albert A-10's empennage was wooden and similar to that of the wing. Its quadrant-shaped fin was part of the fuselage and carried a large, roughly semi-circular, unbalanced rudder. Its elliptical plan horizontal tail was mounted at mid-fuselage height with a one-piece, unbalanced elevator.

It had a fixed, conventional undercarriage with its mainwheels on cranked, split axles from the centreline of the fuselage underside; the track was 3.18 m (10 ft 5 in). On the prototype the axle ends were rubber sprung to faired steel V-struts from the lower fuselage longerons, though production aircraft would have had oleo strut shock absorbers. A steel spring tailskid reached out beyond the end of the fuselage.

The date of the first flight is not known precisely: in early October it was described as just completed but by mid-November it had obtained its certificate of airworthiness. It was still flying at the Villacoublay test ground in February 1930.

Though the A-10 had been designed from the start to be convertible into an ambulance aircraft and to accept Salmson engines of similar power to the Hispano, the A.XI or A-11S (S for sanitaire or ambulance) was not reported until 1932, fitted with a closely cowled 75 kW (100 hp) Salmson radial. It also had a different undercarriage to that of the first A-10, retaining the cranked axles but adding drag struts to the fuselage centre-line and inward-sloping oleo struts to the lower longerons. In April 1932 it was undergoing official tests at Villacoublay which continued at least into June. In October it was one of five prototypes that took part in the Tour de Propagande (Publicity Tour), flying around northern France in eight daily stages. Two A-11s flew. It is not known if one was the A-10, re-engined.

== Variants ==
A-10
Transport, Hispano engine.
A-11S
Air ambulance, Salmson 9AC engine.

== Specifications (Hispano engine) ==
Data from Les Ailes, October 1929

General characteristics

- Crew: One
- Capacity: Three passengers or freight
- Length: 8.54 m (28 ft 0 in)
- Wingspan: 12.50 m (41 ft 0 in)
- Height: 2.87 m (9 ft 5 in)
- Wing area: 21.60 m^{2} (232.5 sq ft)
- Empty weight: 700 kg (1,543 lb)
- Gross weight: 1,000–1,100 kg (2,205–2,425 lb)
- Powerplant: 1 × Hispano-Suiza 6Pa 6-cylinder inline engine, 75–89 kW (100–120 hp)
- Propellers: 2-bladed

Performance

- Maximum speed: 175 km/h (109 mph, 94 kn) at ground level
- Range: 750 km (470 mi, 400 nmi)
- Landing speed: 78 km/h (48 mph; 42 kn)
