= Avia BH-29 =

BH-29
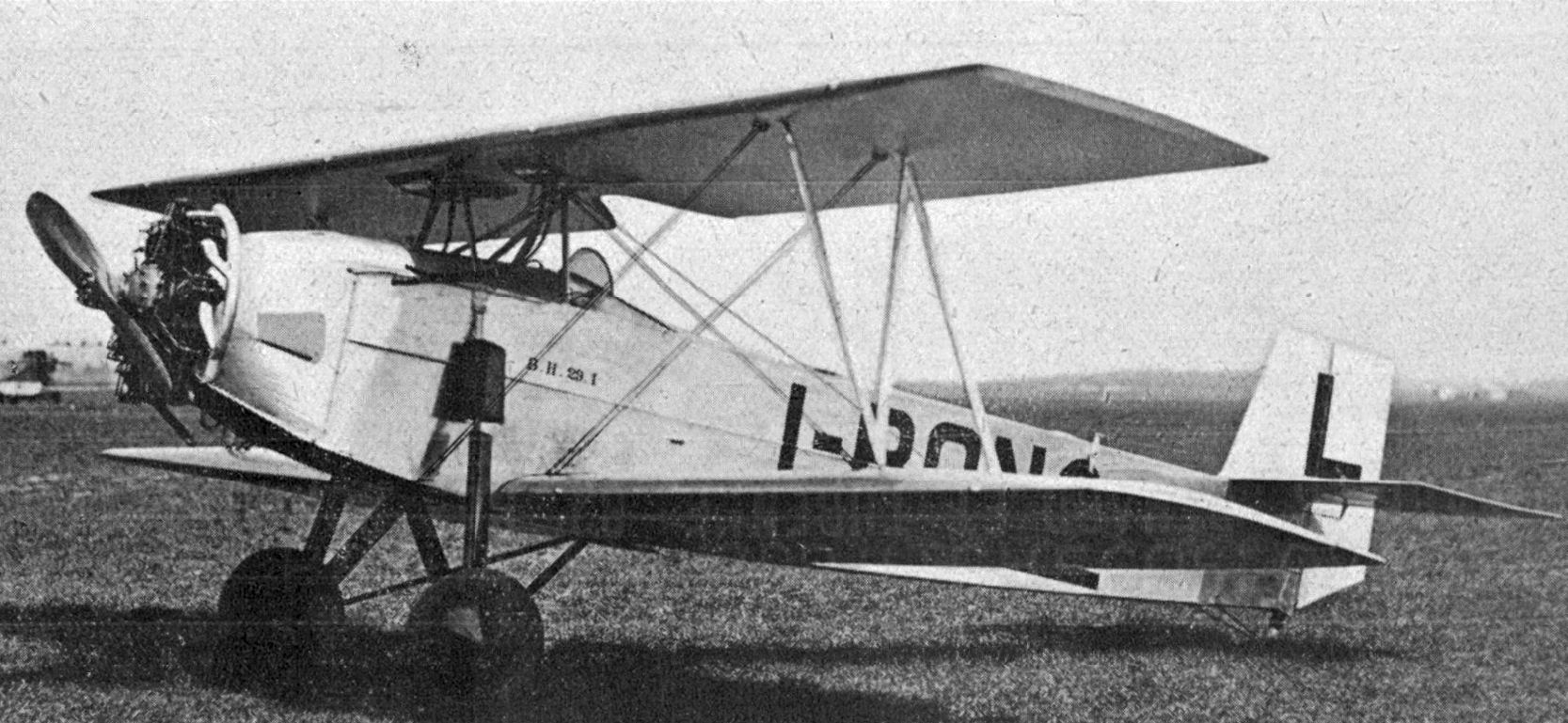

General information
- Type: Trainer
- Manufacturer: Avia
- Designer: Pavel Beneš and Miroslav Hajn
- Number built: 2

History
- First flight: 1927

The Avia BH-29 was a trainer aircraft built in Czechoslovakia in 1927, in the hope of marketing it to the Czechoslovak Army, and to Czechoslovak Airlines as a primary trainer. It was a conventional design, a staggered unequal-span biplane of wooden construction with tailskid undercarriage. The pilot and instructor sat in tandem open cockpits. The aircraft was powered by a 85 hp (63 kW) Walter NZ 85. A more powerful version was built, powered by a 120 hp (89 kW) Walter NZ 120 radial engine.

When no interest was shown in the aircraft domestically, Avia undertook a promotional tour where the aircraft was demonstrated in eighteen European countries, but this did not result in any sales either and only a few were built.

== Specifications (NZ 85 engine) ==
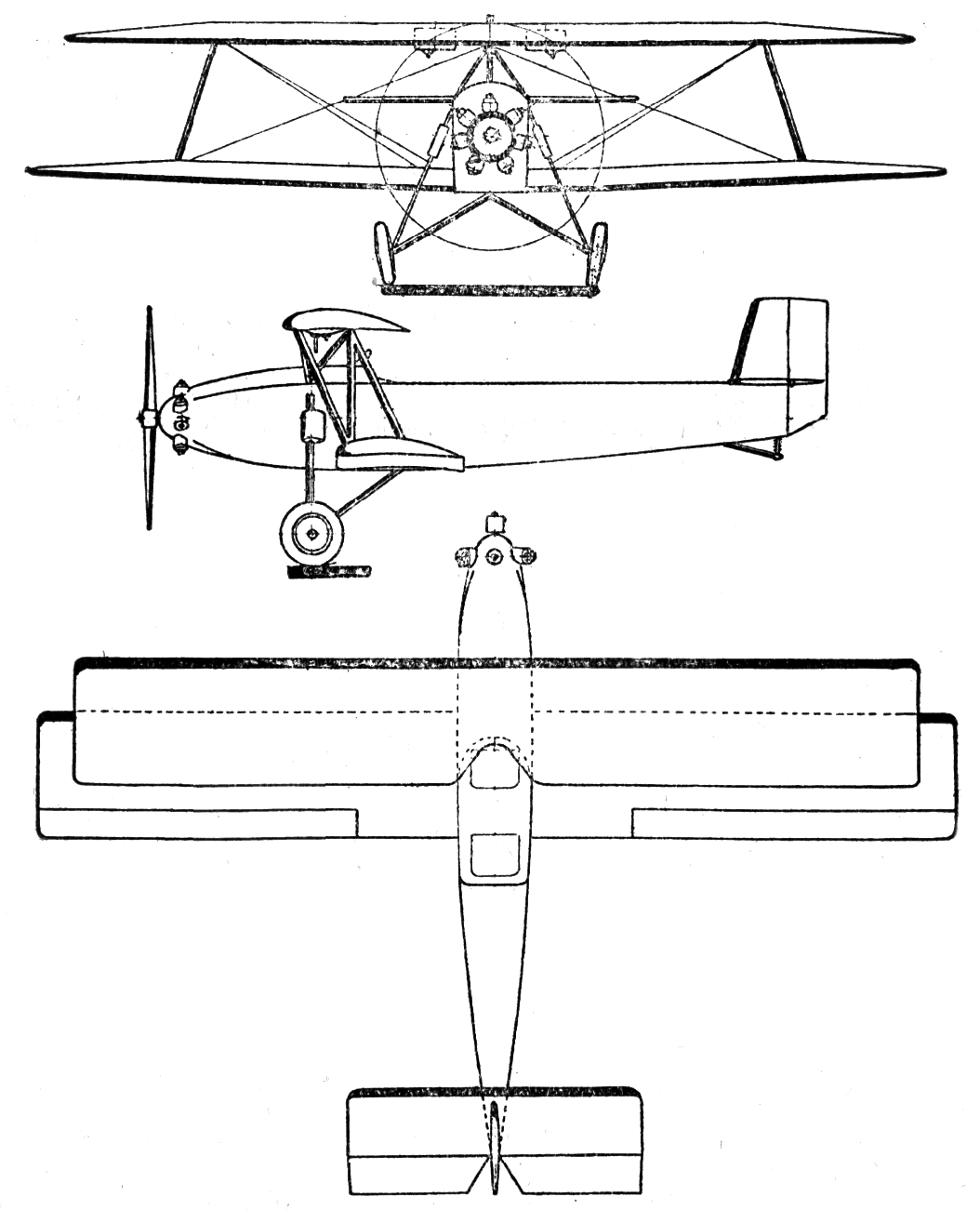
Avia BH-29 3-view drawing from Les Ailes, 21 June 1928

Data from Jane's all the World's Aircraft 1928

General characteristics

- Crew: two
- Length: 7.4 m (24 ft 3 in)
- Wingspan: 9.8 m (32 ft 2 in)
- Wing area: 25 m^{2} (270 sq ft)
- Empty weight: 545 kg (1,202 lb)
- Gross weight: 815 kg (1,797 lb)
- Powerplant: 1 × Walter NZ 85 7-cyl. air-cooled radial piston engine, 63 kW (85 hp) rated power, 75 kW (100 hp) for take-off
- Propellers: 2-bladed fixed-pitch propeller

Performance

- Maximum speed: 135 km/h (84 mph, 73 kn)
- Stall speed: 60 km/h (37 mph, 32 kn)
- Range: 420 km (260 mi, 230 nmi)
- Service ceiling: 2,200 m (7,200 ft)
- Rate of climb: 2.5 m/s (490 ft/min)
- Time to altitude: 1,000 m (3,300 ft) in 12 minutes; 2,000 m (6,600 ft) in 40 minutes
