= LKL II =

Polish three-seat touring aircraft

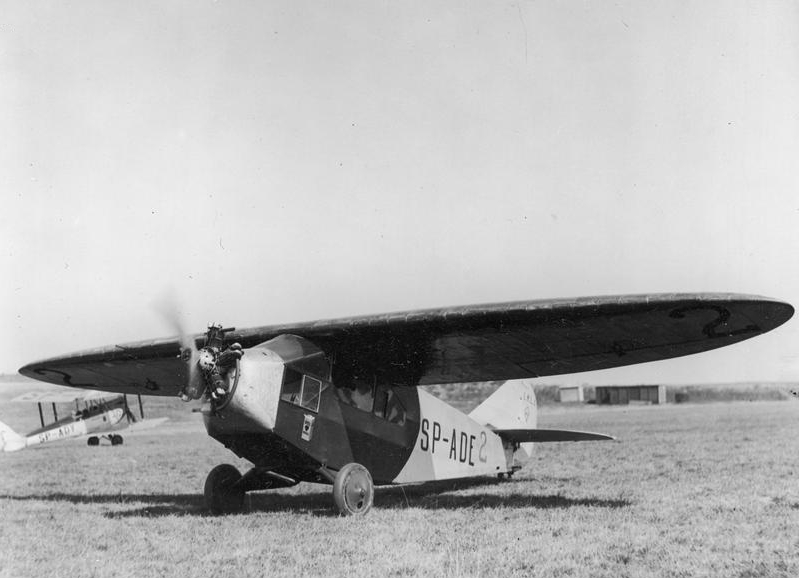

General information
- Type: Three-seat tourer
- National origin: Poland
- Manufacturer: Lubelski Klub Lotniczy (Lublin Aero Club)
- Designer: Bartolewski and Teisseyre
- Number built: 2

History
- First flight: July 1930

The LKL II was a Polish three-seat competitive touring aircraft first flown in 1930.

== Design and development ==
The LKL II was the first aircraft built in the workshop of the Lubelski Klub Lotniczy (LKL) and was intended to compete in the 1930 Second Challenge de Tourisme International. Two examples of the three-seat cabin monoplane were built together, starting in the summer of 1929 and completed the following year with a first flight in July 1930 flown by Jozef Zuromski. The second airframe was destroyed by fire during its first take-off attempt.

The LKL II was a high, cantilever wing aircraft of mixed construction which had a one-piece, two spar wooden wing with plywood covering, elliptical in plan and bolted directly on the top of the welded steel tube fuselage structure. It was powered by a 63 kW (85 hp) Walter Vega five-cylinder radial engine, mounted with its cylinders exposed for cooling. Behind the engine the fuselage was fabric covered. Its large, enclosed cabin had a bench seat for two passengers behind the pilot and a luggage compartment at the rear. Entry was via a starboard side door.

Its empenage was a steel tube structure with fabric covering. The fin was triangular and carried a deep semi-circular rudder which worked between the elevators. Its tailplane was mounted on top of the fuselage and was adjustable.

The LKL II had a fixed, conventional undercarriage with mainwheeels on streamlined struts hinged on the lower longerons. These joined rubber shock absorbers placed within the fuselage.

== Operational history ==
The loss of the second airframe slowed the development of the first, preventing it from participating in the Challenge but it was later much used by the LKL, taking part in several later contests. It came fifth in the first Lublinian-Podlasian competition early in 1931 and seventh out of twenty-two in the Fourth National Lightplane Contest in September 1931, on both occasions flown by Zuromski. It continued to take part in local events through 1932 until it was retired in 1934.

Bartolewski and Teisseyre considered an ambulance development of the LKL II and also studied and perhaps began to build the LKL III, which would have had a cleaned-up fuselage and a more powerful engine, but neither proposal generated sufficient funding to complete them.

== Specifications ==
Data from Cynk, 1971, except where noted

General characteristics

- Crew: One
- Capacity: Two passengers
- Length: 7 m (23 ft 0 in)
- Wingspan: 11.5 m (37 ft 9 in)
- Height: 2.54 m (8 ft 4 in)
- Wing area: 18.5 m^{2} (199 sq ft)
- Aspect ratio: 7
- Empty weight: 453 kg (999 lb)
- Max takeoff weight: 840 kg (1,852 lb)
- Powerplant: 1 × Walter Vega 5-cylinder radial, 63 kW (85 hp)
- Propellers: Two-bladed fixed-pitch propeller

Performance

- Maximum speed: 150 km/h (93 mph, 81 kn) at sea level
- Cruise speed: 120 km/h (75 mph, 65 kn)
- Range: 970 km (600 mi, 520 nmi)
- Service ceiling: 4,800 m (15,700 ft)
- Rate of climb: 3.5 m/s (690 ft/min)
- Landing speed:75 km/h (47 mph)
