= Avia BH-11 =

BH-11
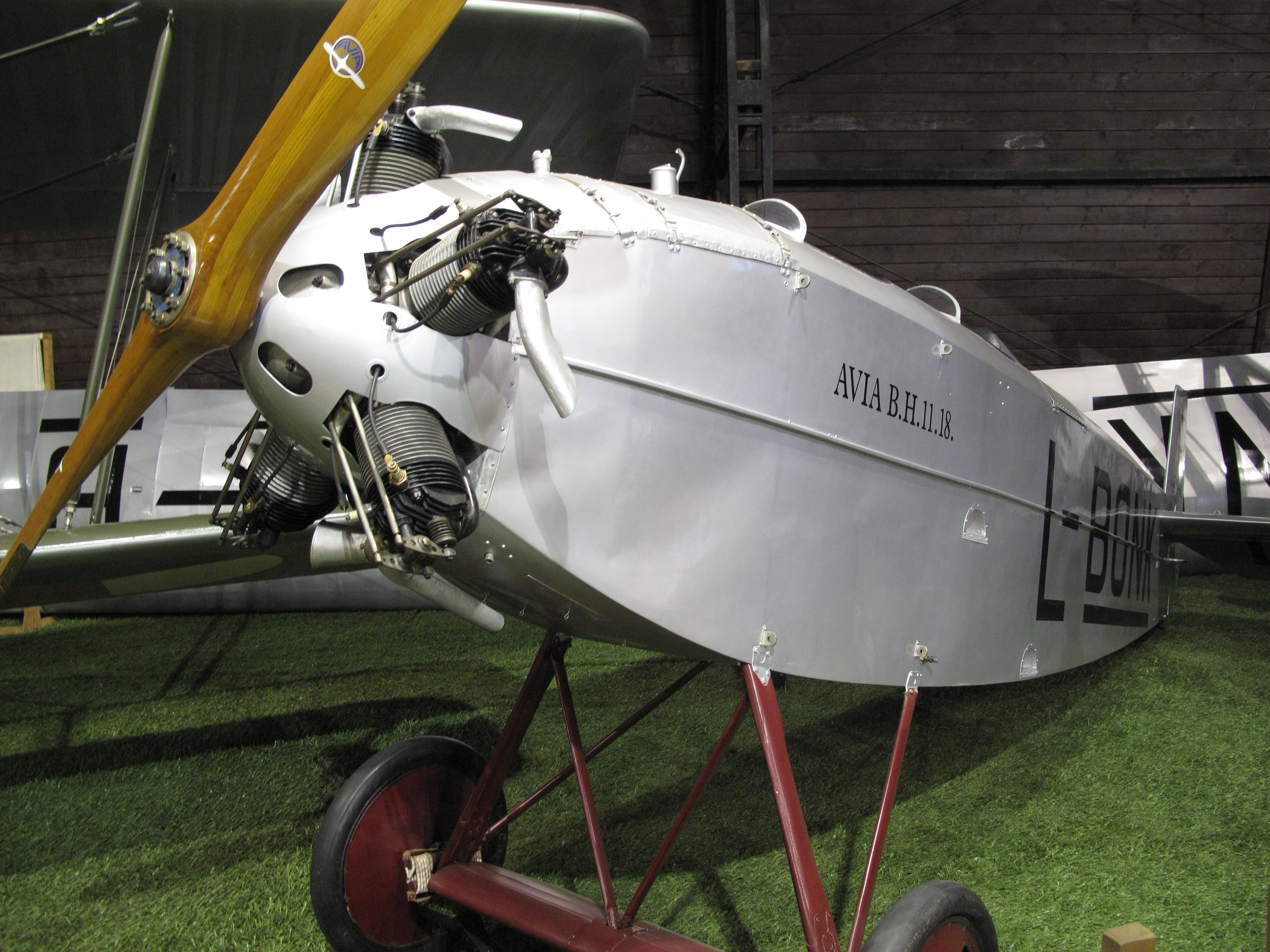

General information
- Type: Sports plane
- Manufacturer: Avia
- Designer: Pavel Beneš and Miroslav Hajn
- Number built: c. 20

History
- First flight: 1923
- Developed from: Avia BH-9

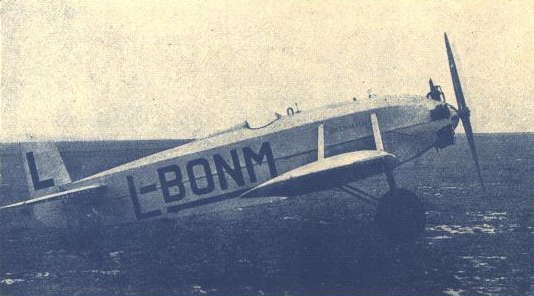
Avia BH-11b

The Avia BH-11 was a two-seat monoplane sport aircraft designed and produced by the Czechoslovak aircraft manufacturer Avia.

It was designed during the early 1920s as a further development of the Avia BH-9. The principal changes from its predecessor centred around the aircraft's redesigned forward fuselage. It performed its maiden flight in 1923. The project quickly garnered the attention of the Czechoslovak Army; the service ordered 15 aircraft, which were operated under the military designation B.11. They were used both as trainers and general liaison aircraft. The type proved itself to be quite competitive for the era, winning numerous air races during the mid 1920s.

Six years after the first flight of the BH-11, production commenced of a revised version, the BH-11B Antelope, that was marketed towards the civil sector instead. This replaced the original Walter NZ 60 45 kW (60 hp) engine with a Walter Vega of 63 kW (85 hp) and was built in small numbers. As a further development, the BH-11C retained the original engine but the wingspan was increased by 1.4 m (4 ft 6 in).

A BH-11A and a BH-11C are preserved at the Prague Aviation Museum, Kbely.

== Design ==
The Avia BH-11 was a twin-seat monoplane with a low-mounted wing and a fuselage primarily composed of plywood. It could accommodate up to two occupants, seated in tandem; the pilot was seated behind the passenger. A sturdy projection was present behind the pilot that protected both occupants in event of the aircraft capsizing. External visibility was relatively favourable. The primary flight controls consisted of a control stick and rudder bar; the trainer aircraft was outfitted with dual flight control which could be instantaneously disconnected if required. In terms of its flight performance, the aircraft was relatively stable and quick, capable of performing various aerobatic manoeuvres while also being relatively easy to fly. The aircraft was well suited to several mission types, particularly the training, liaison, and touring roles.

The BH-11 had trapezoidal-shaped wings and were thickest at the attachment points for the struts. Each wing was attached via a pair of joints to the lower longerons of the fuselage and were rigidly braced by two tubular struts against the upper pair of longerons. The forward struts were provided with threads for adjustment, which facilitated the wing to be rapidly and readily assembled and disassembled as required. While the aircraft was being transported on the ground, it was commonplace for the demounted wings to be suspended alongside the fuselage. The structure of the wing, which was largely composed wood, consisted of two spars, an assortment of ribs and rods. The exterior was mostly covered by fabric, although a plywood covering was present between the leading edge and the rear spar. The wing was produced in two sizes; trainer aircraft were typically fitted with a wing that had a span of 9.72 m (31.89 ft.) while the touring aircraft had an enlarged wing with a span of 10.2 m (33.46 ft.). The ailerons had a framework of welded steel tubes and were actuated via a system of rods and levers.

The structure of the fuselage comprised four wooden longerons that were connected by transverse frames. Towards the rear of the fuselage, it tapered to a vertical edge. The tail unit had a wooden cantilevered stabilizer. Both the elevator and rudder had tubular steel frames and were operated via flexible cables. A mixed construction undercarriage was used; the vertical struts were composed of wood while streamlined steel tubes were used for the inner V-shaped struts and the rear struts alike. The two semi-axles were lodged in a compact supporting plane and were furnished with rubber shock absorbers. The aircraft was equipped with a tail skid that used an arrangement steel springs.

The aircraft was typically powered by a single Walter NZ 60 five-cylinder radial engine, capable of generating up to 60 hp. It drove, via a direct drive arrangement, an in-house designed wooden twin-bladed fixed-pitch propeller. The engine was fitted within the aircraft's nose and mounted on the first full bulkhead. Fuel was stored within a single tank located at the top of the fuselage while the oil tank was placed in close proximity to the engine itself. Both tanks were composed of sheet aluminium.

== Operational history ==
During the mid 1920s, the BH-11 performed numerous long distance flight, proving itself capable of non-stop flights of as far as 1,200 kn (746 miles) between points such as London and the Black Sea. It was also promptly entered into several air races. During the Prague speed contest of 1925, the type covered the circuit of 200km (124.3 miles) while flying at around 160 kmph (99.4 mph). That same year, a BH-11 won the Cup of Italy; it repeated this feat the following year.

== Specifications (BH-11) ==
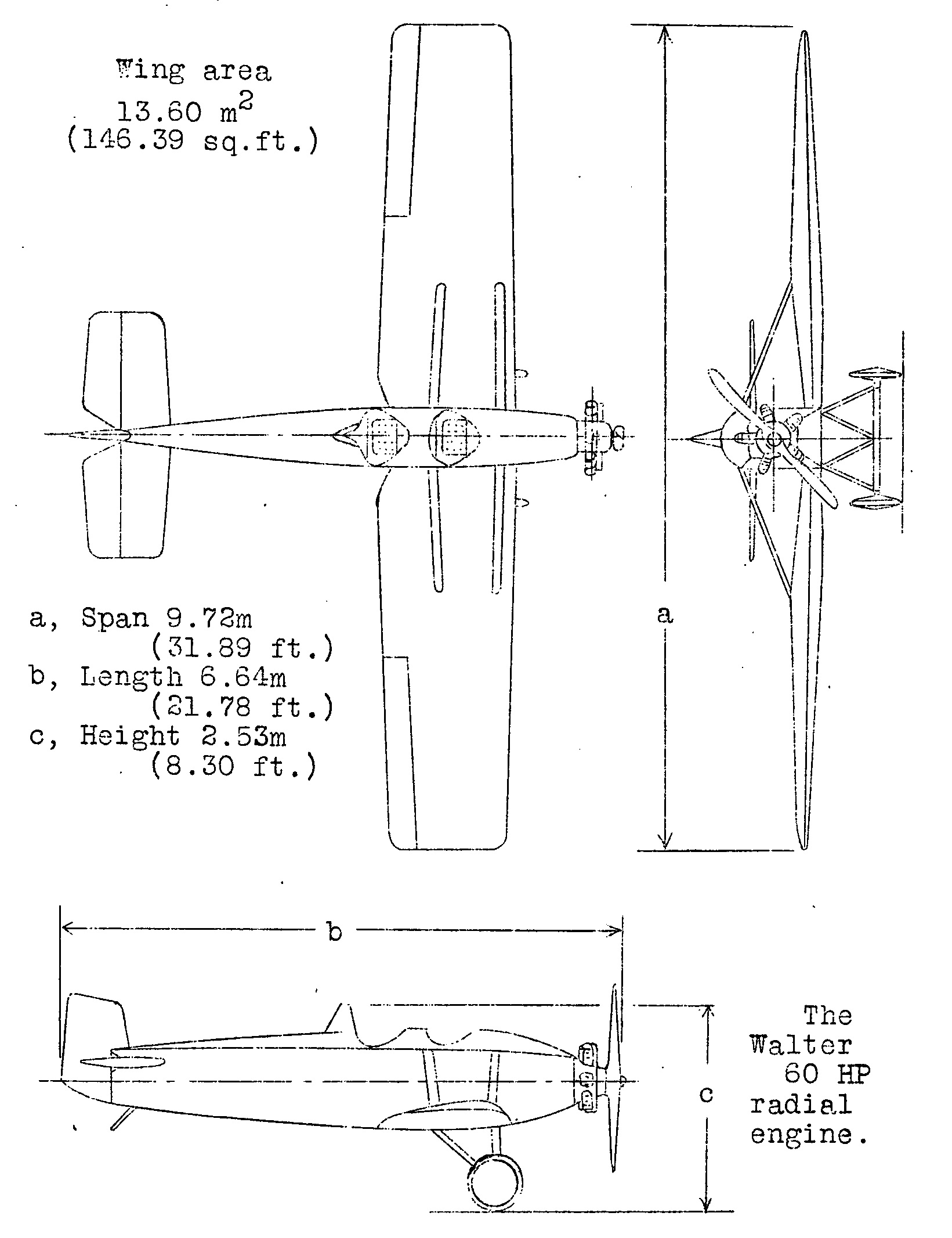
Avia BH-11 3-view drawing from NACA Aircraft Circular No.40

Data from Jane's all the World's Aircraft 1928, National Advisory Committee for Aeronautics

General characteristics

- Crew: 2
- Length: 6.64 m (21 ft 9 in)
- Wingspan: 9.72 m (31 ft 11 in)
- Height: 2.53 m (8 ft 4 in)
- Wing area: 13.6 m^{2} (146 sq ft)
- Empty weight: 360 kg (794 lb)
- Gross weight: 610 kg (1,345 lb)
- Fuel capacity: 80 kg (180 lb) fuel and oil
- Powerplant: 1 × Walter NZ 60 five-cylinder air-cooled radial piston engine, 45 kW (60 hp)
- Propellers: 2-bladed fixed-pitch propeller

Performance

- Maximum speed: 160 km/h (99 mph, 86 kn)
- Stall speed: 75 km/h (47 mph, 40 kn)
- Range: 650 km (400 mi, 350 nmi)
- Service ceiling: 3,300 m (10,800 ft)
- Rate of climb: 2.7 m/s (530 ft/min)
- Time to altitude: 1,000 m (3,300 ft) in six minutes; 2,000 m (6,600 ft) in 18 minutes
- Wing loading: 45 kg/m^{2} (9.2 lb/sq ft)
- Power/mass: 0.0733 kW/kg (0.0446 hp/lb)

== See also ==
Related development

- BH-5
- BH-9
- BH-10
- BH-12
