= Fizir AF-2 =

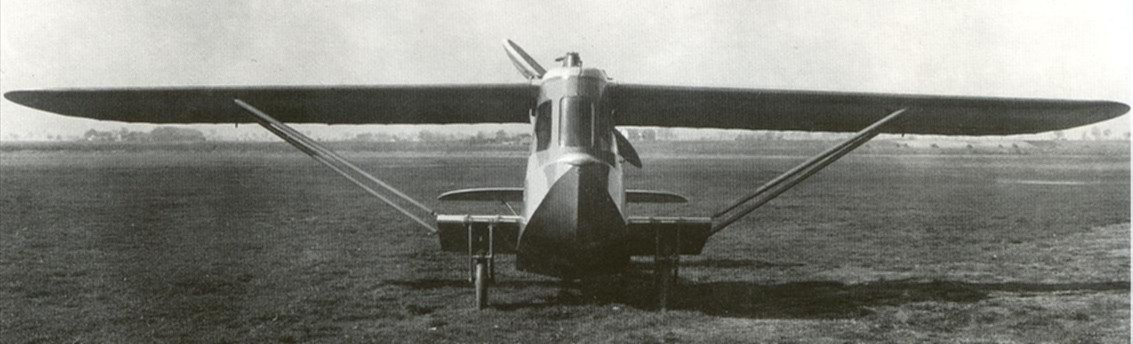

General information
- Type: Two seat amphibian
- National origin: Kingdom of Yugoslavia
- Designer: Rudolf Fizir

History
- First flight: 1930-31

The Fizir AF-2, Fizir 85 CV or Fizir-Vega was a two-seat amphibian intended for touring, sport and training.

== Design and development ==
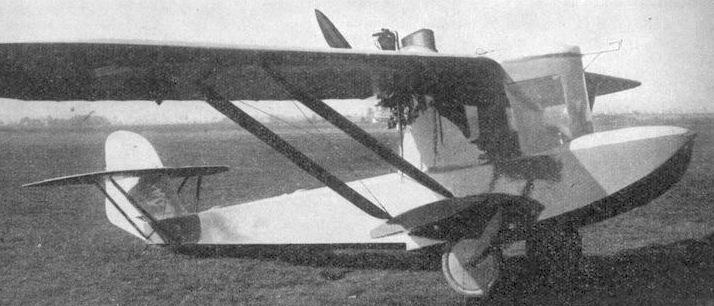
Fizir AF-2 photo from l'Aerophile April 1931

The Fizir AF-2 was an amphibious flying boat with a wood framed, plywood covered, single step hull, stabilized on the water by a pair of sponsons. On its forward upper surface there was a tall, airfoil section, largely vertically sided column containing the cockpit and joining fuselage and the wing centre section. The cockpit contained two seats in tandem with the pilot in front ahead of the wing leading edge and behind a vertical windscreen. He had two side windows, as did the passenger in the rear. An easily removable cabin top was available and dual controls could be fitted.

The AF-2 had a high, parallel chord, two part wing with straight edges, semi-elliptical tips and about 6° of sweep. It had a largely wooden structure with twin box spars and was fabric covered. The wing was braced on each side with a pair of parallel, backward leaning, faired struts from the tips of the sponsons to the wing spars. A pusher configuration engine was mounted on the rear wing spar within a central rectangular wing cut-out, with its propeller disk immediately behind the wing trailing edge. The AF-2 fitted was an 63 kW (85 hp) Walter Vega five-cylinder radial engine, though there were plans to install other types in the 60–82 kW (80–110 hp) power range. Its fuel tank was between the spars, immediately ahead of the gravity fed engine.

The empennage was conventional, with a straight edged, blunt topped fin and rudder. The tailplane, semi-elliptical in plan, was mounted halfway up the fin, braced on each side with a pair of struts from the lower fuselage. The elevators had a small cut-out for rudder movement. These tail control surfaces were fabric covered steel structures.

For use on land the AF-2 had independently mounted wheels, each between a pair of legs fitted with a shock absorber and hinged on a tube in the leading edge of the sponson. This arrangement enabled them to be raised by rotation, though still exposed, or lowered in fifteen seconds through a worm gear drive. There was a laminated tailskid.

The AF-2 probably first flew in late 1930 or early in 1931, though the exact date is not known and there are no further contemporary reports of its development in Flugsport or the major French and English journals.

== Specifications (Vega engine) ==
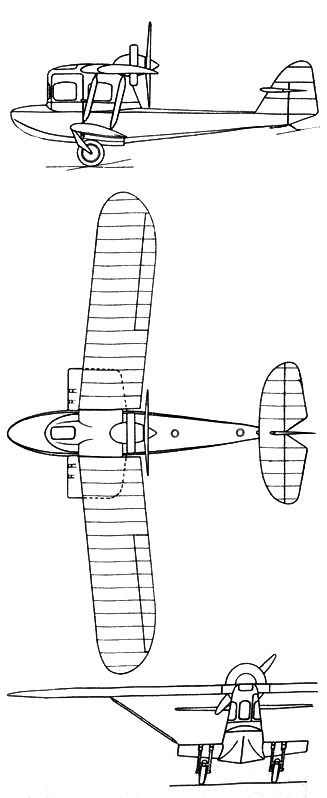
Fizir AF-2 3-view drawing from l'Aerophile April 1931

Data from L'Aérophile April 1931, p.117

General characteristics

- Crew: Two
- Length: 7.15 m (23 ft 5 in)
- Wingspan: 11.20 m (36 ft 9 in)
- Wing area: 16 m^{2} (170 sq ft)
- Empty weight: 460 kg (1,014 lb)
- Gross weight: 690 kg (1,521 lb)
- Powerplant: 1 × Walter Vega 5-cylinder radial, 63 kW (85 hp) 85 CV
- Propellers: 2-bladed

Performance

- Maximum speed: 140 km/h (87 mph, 76 kn) at ground level
- Range: 400 km (250 mi, 220 nmi)
- Service ceiling: 3,500 m (11,500 ft)
- Take-off distance: 100 m (330 ft)
- Take-off from water in: 10 sec
- Landing speed: 60–65 km/h (37–40 mph)
