= Pander E =

Dutch training aircraft

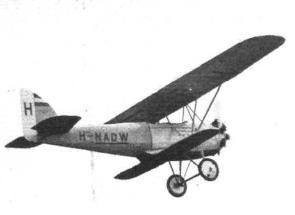
- The RAC's second Pander EC at the Dutch International Competition in July 1928

General information
- Type: Two-seat sport and training biplane
- National origin: Netherlands
- Manufacturer: Nederlandse Fabriek van Vliegtuigen H. Pander & Zonen
- Designer: Theo Slot
- Number built: 17

History
- First flight: 18 February 1926

The Pander E was the first indigenous Dutch training aircraft, used by clubs and also privately owned. A two-seat, single-engine biplane, 17 were built in the Netherlands from 1926 with engines of increasing power.

== Design and development ==
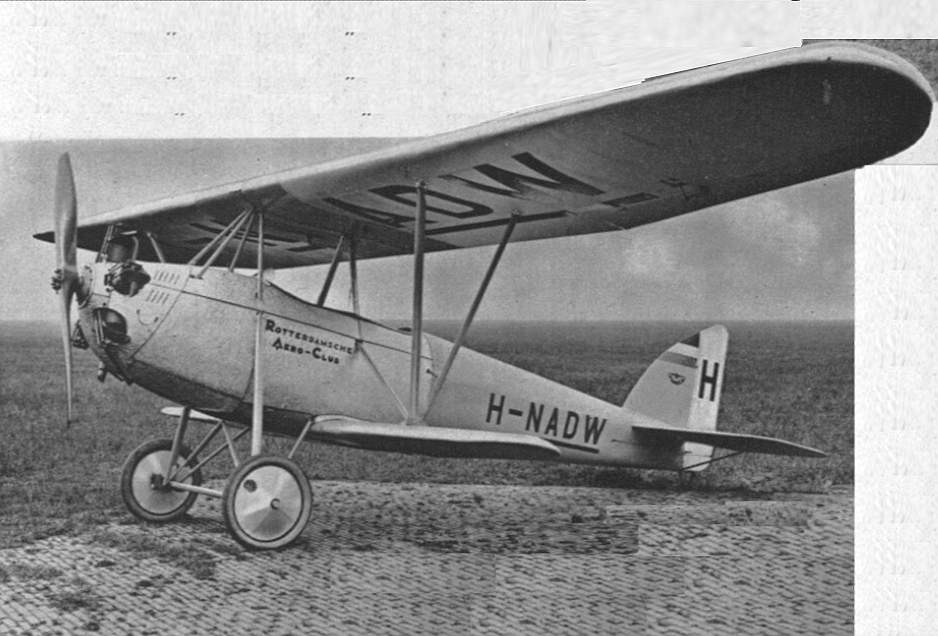
Walter NZ-60 and Pander EC

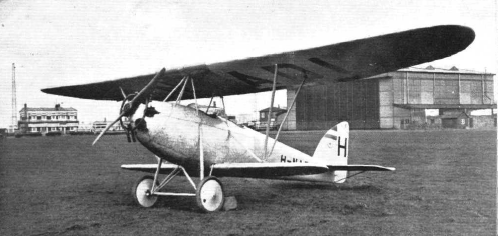
First prototype with Anzani engine

Pander followed their first aircraft, the small, single-seat monoplane Pander D with a two-seat, low-powered biplane for club and training use. The Pander E was a true sesquiplane, with a lower wingspan exactly half that of the upper span; in plan, though not in detailed construction the lower wing was almost a half scale copy of the upper wing, the two maximum chords being in the ratio of 0.52 and the area ratio 0.23. The wings were entirely of wooden construction, apart from part of their covering. The upper plane was built around two box spars with spruce flanges and plywood webs. From the leading edge to behind the forward spar the covering was three-ply, with fabric aft. There were ailerons only on this upper wing. The narrower lower wings were of similar construction but used only a single box spar, though this was extended into a larger D-box by ply skinning forward around the leading edge. The wings were arranged so that the rear spar of the upper one was vertically above the single lower wing spar and the aft member of the V-form interplane struts was correspondingly vertical, with the forward member reaching forward to the forward upper spar. These Vs leaned outwards, their base on the lower wing strengthened with a further single strut to the upper fuselage longeron. The upper wing, built in two pieces, was held high above the fuselage by four cabane struts to the front spar and two more to the aft; the wings were pin-jointed to them.

The fuselage of the early Pander Es was of mixed construction, the forward structure from welded steel tubes with aluminium sheet skinning and the rear wood-framed and plywood-covered. From the seventh aircraft onward, the fuselage became an all-metal structure. The fin and tailplane were wood framed and ply covered but the rudder and elevators had steel tube leading edges and sheet steel ribs. The open, tandem cockpits were fitted with dual control. The first Pander Es had a 45 hp (33 kW) Anzani 6-cylinder radial engine, cowled but with the cylinder heads exposed for cooling; later models used several different engines including members of the Walter NZ radial family engine as well as the de Havilland Gipsy inline. The fixed, conventional undercarriage was a steel tube structure with a single axle supported by V-form stuts on each side, one leg to the upper fuselage longeron and one to the lower, braced laterally by short struts to the lower centre fuselage.

The first Pander E flew on 18 February 1926.

== Operational history ==
One of the first public appearances of the Pander E first prototype was at the Coupe Zenith, held on 4 July 1926, where it was placed fourth. It was destroyed in a fatal crash less than a month later. Nonetheless, the Rotterdam Aero Club (RAC) placed an initial order for two, received in 1927, and another the following year; these were the first Dutch aircraft used for training. For financial reasons they set up the National Aviation School (NLS) and in 1929 transferred their three aircraft, all ECs with the 60 hp (33 kW) five-cylinder engine, to the NLS. Between then and 1932 the NLS received four more new aircraft from Pander, all 85 hp (63 kW), seven-cylinder powered EFs. In 1930 they acquired a previously privately owned EC and in 1932 a privately owned Gipsy-powered EG. The Dutch East Indies Flying Club bought two EGs, and there were five other individually owned examples, one EF and three EGs.

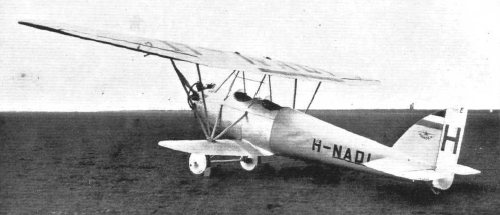
First prototype with Anzani engine

== Variants ==
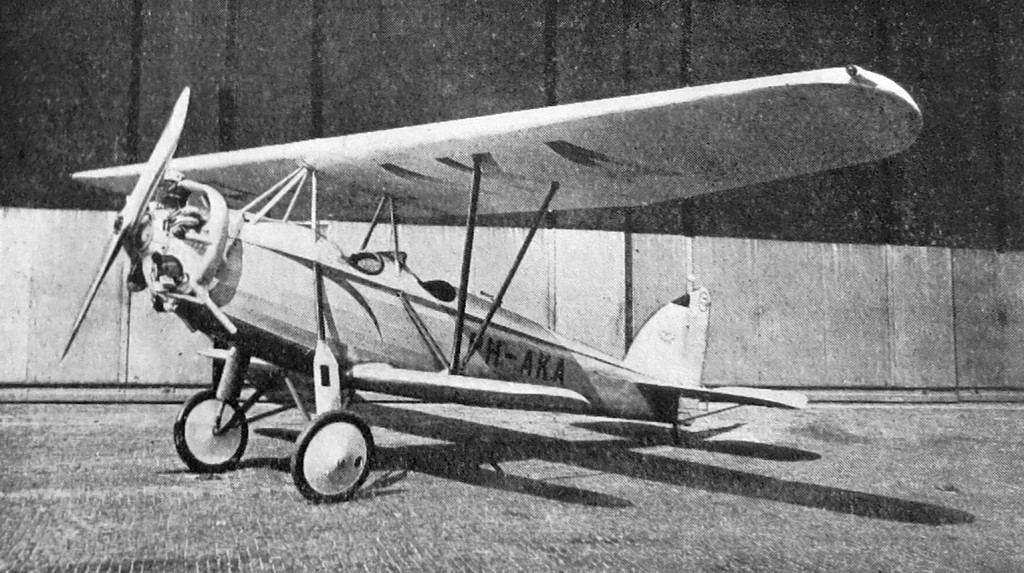
Engine Walter Vega and aircraft Pander EF85 (PH-AKA)

Numbers from Golden Years

E
First prototype. 45 hp (34 kW) Anzani 6-cylinder radial engine.
EC
or EC60; 60 hp (40 kW) Walter NZ 60 5-cylinder radial. (Note: Wesselink refers to the 60 hp engine as the Walter IV.) five built.
EF
or EF85; 85 hp (64 kW) Walter Vega eventually Walter NZ-70, 5-cylinder radial. six built.
EG
or EG100; 100 hp (75 KW) take off power de Havilland Gipsy I four-cylinder upright air-cooled inline. four built.
EH
or EH120; 120 hp (90 KW) take off power de Havilland Gipsy III four-cylinder upright air-cooled inline. one built.
EK
or EK80; one converted from EC.

== Specifications (Anzani engine) ==
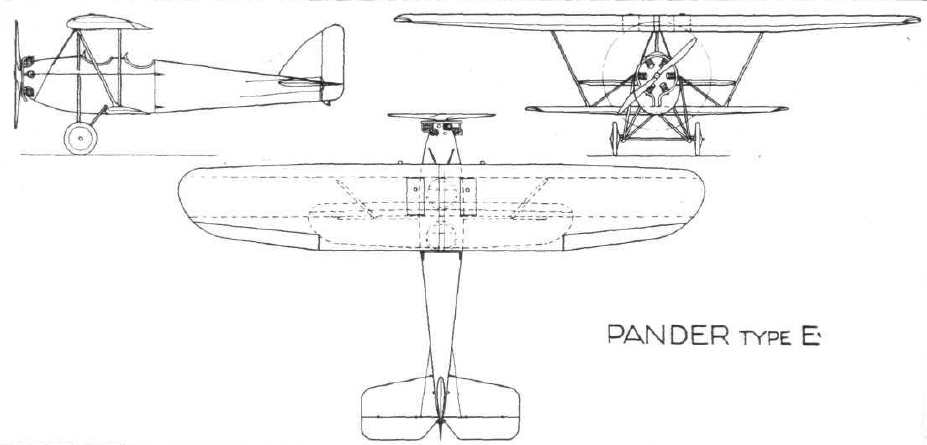
First prototype, Anzani engine

Data from Flight 1 April 1926

General characteristics

- Crew: two
- Length: 6.20 m (20 ft 4 in)
- Upper wingspan: 10.0 m (32 ft 10 in)
- Lower wingspan: 5.0 m (16 ft 5 in)
- Wing area: 17.61 m^{2} (189.6 sq ft) total (upper wing 14.31 m^{2} (154.0 sq ft)); lower 3.0 m^{2} (35.5 sq ft))
- Empty weight: 318 kg (702 lb)
- Gross weight: 535 kg (1,180 lb) pilot, passenger, 4 h fuel
- Fuel capacity: 68.2 L (15 Imp gal; 18 US gal)
- Powerplant: 1 × Anzani 6-cylinder 2-row air-cooled radial engine, 34 kW (45 hp) continuous at 1,500 rpm and maximum 37 kW (50 hp) at 1,580 rpm
- Propellers: 2-bladed

Performance

- Maximum speed: 126 km/h (78 mph, 68 kn)
- Cruise speed: 116 km/h (72 mph, 63 kn)
- Service ceiling: 3,500 m (11,500 ft)
- Time to altitude: 915 m (3,000 ft) in 7.75 min
- Wing loading: 30 kg/m^{2} (6.2 lb/sq ft)
- Power/mass: 62 W/kg (0.038 hp/lb) at normal power
- Landing speed: 61 km/h (38 mph)
