= Breda Ba.15 =

Two-seat light aircraft produced in Italy in 1928

Ba.15
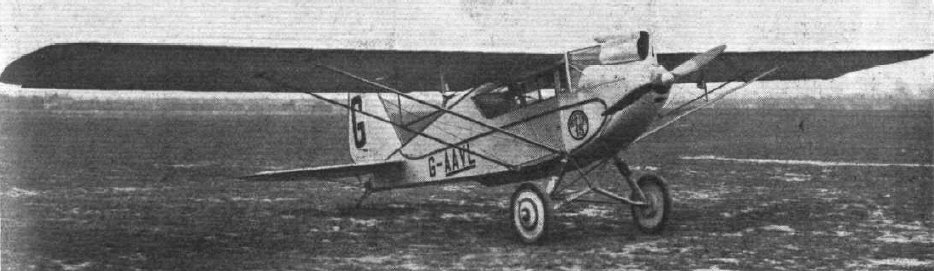
- Breda Ba.15

General information
- Type: utility
- Manufacturer: Breda
- Designer: Cesare Pallavicino
- Primary user: Regia Aeronautica

History
- First flight: 1928

The Breda Ba.15 was a two-seat light aircraft produced in Italy in 1928.

== Design and development ==
The Ba.15 was a high-wing braced monoplane of conventional design that seated the pilot and passenger in tandem within a fully enclosed cabin. Ba.15s were fitted with a wide variety of engines. The most popularly selected was the Walter Venus, but examples also left the factory powered by Cirrus III, de Havilland Gipsy, Colombo S.63, Walter Mars I, and Isotta Fraschini 80 T engines.

== Operational history ==
Breda Ba.15s took part in several competitions. Among others, in August 1930 Col. Sacchi won the race Giro Aereo d'Italia flying Breda Ba.15S (altogether 10 Bredas took part in this contest). Besides their civil use, some Ba.15s were operated by the Regia Aeronautica. An example is preserved at the Museo Nazionale della Scienza e della Tecnologia in Milan. One Ba.15 was bought in 1929 by an Italian resident in Paraguay, Nicola Bo. The plane had the Italian civil registration I-AAUG. This plane was later sold to the Paraguayan Military Aviation and used in the Chaco War as a light transport plane with the serial T-8. It was destroyed in an accident in 1933.

== Variants ==
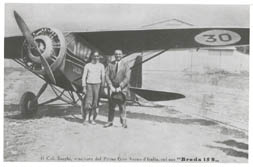
Breda Ba.15S

- Ba.15 : Two-seat cabin touring, sporting aircraft.
- Ba.15S : Improved version.

== Operators ==
Ethiopia

- Ethiopian Air Force

Kingdom of Italy

- Regia Aeronautica

Paraguay

- Paraguayan Air Arm

== Specifications (Ba.15S) ==
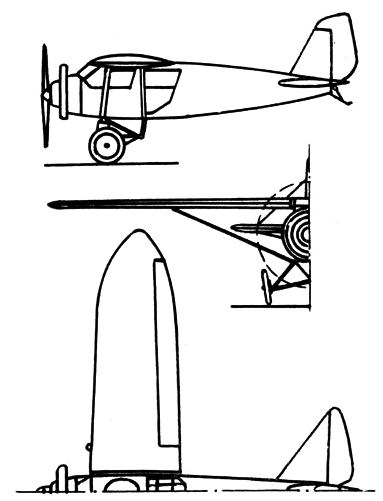
Breda Ba.15 3-view drawing from L'Aerophile Salon 1932

General characteristics

- Crew: 1 pilot
- Capacity: 1 passenger
- Length: 7 m (23 ft 0 in)
- Wingspan: 10.8 m (35 ft 5 in)
- Height: 2.25 m (7 ft 5 in)
- Wing area: 16 m^{2} (170 sq ft)
- Gross weight: 770 kg (1,698 lb)
- Powerplant: 1 × Walter Venus 7-cyl. air-cooled radial piston engine, 82 kW (110 hp)
- Propellers: 2-bladed fixed pitch propeller

Performance

- Maximum speed: 200 km/h (120 mph, 110 kn)
- Endurance: 6 hours
- Service ceiling: 4,000 m (13,000 ft)
