= Skraba S.T.3 =

Two-seat Polish biplane built in 1928

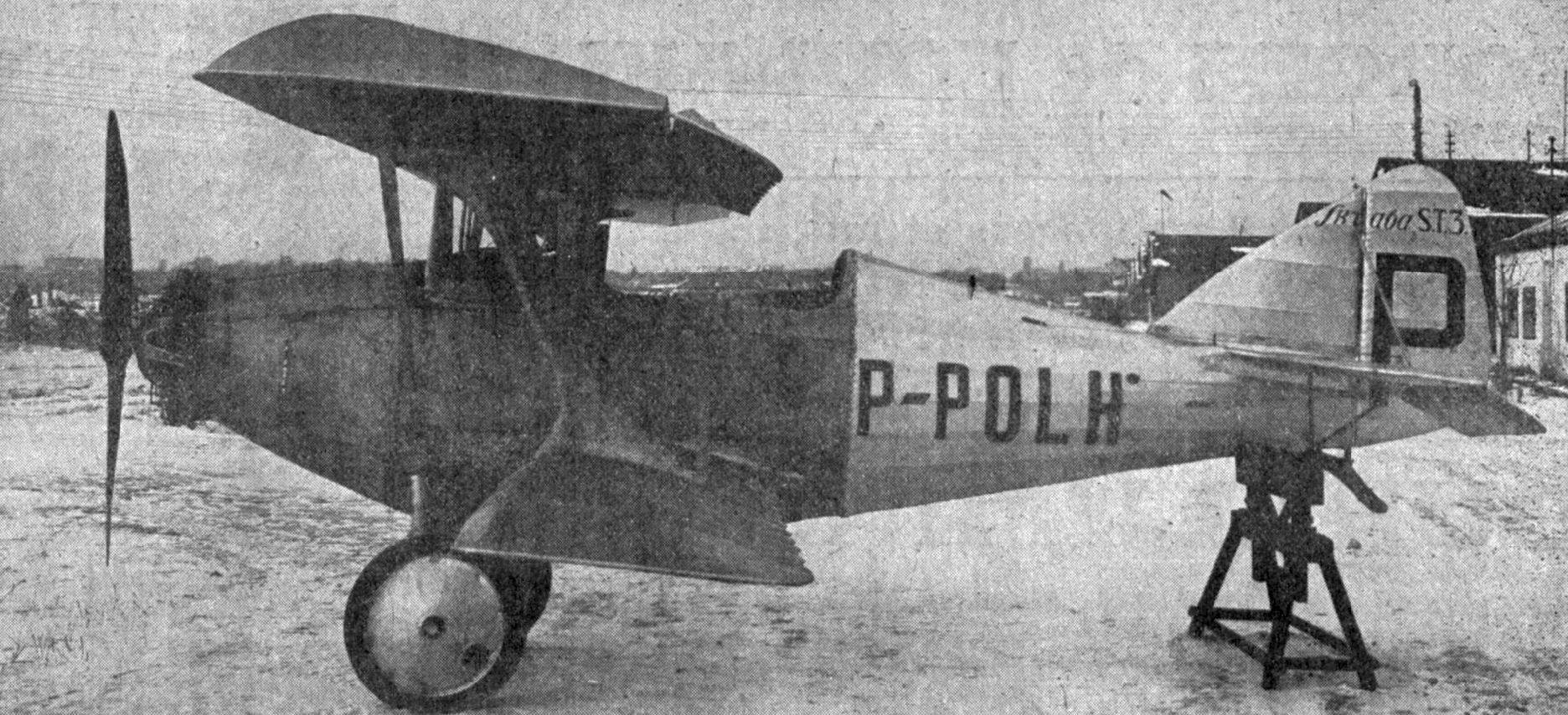

General information
- Type: Two-seat sport and touring aircraft
- National origin: Poland
- Manufacturer: C.W.L. (Centralne Warsztaty Lotnicze - central aviation workshops)
- Designer: Boleslaw Skraba
- Number built: 1

History
- First flight: July 1927

The Skraba S.T.3 was a two-seat Polish biplane built in 1928. It was the first all-metal aircraft designed in Poland; only one was completed.

== Design and development ==
Bolesław Skraba (born 1894), a former Austro-Hungarian pilot during the First World War, was one of the most experienced Polish flight instructors in early interwar period, and also the test pilot in C.W.L. (central aviation workshops) in Warsaw. One of his greatest ambitions at that time was to establish an aircraft range record on a Polish-made plane. Building of Skraba S.T.3 was his private initiative, as it was mainly designed to achieve the mentioned goal.

The S.T.3 had a duralumin structure and was a sesquiplane; though the lower wing had a span only slightly less than the upper, its chord was reduced to 60%. The lower wing was also aerodynamically thinner than the upper. Both wings were in two parts and had blunted rectangular plans. They were built around two girder spars, with dural skin around the leading edges and fabric covered elsewhere, including the full-span ailerons which were mounted on the upper wing only. The S.T.3 was a single bay biplane with extreme stagger, braced on each side by a single streamlined, forward-leaning interplane strut with wide extremities connecting to both forward and aft spars. The upper wing was held over the fuselage with a cabane of two transverse inverted V-struts from the spars at the central wing joint to the upper fuselage longerons. The lower wings were attached to the lower longerons.

The underlying fuselage structure was a rectangular section girder frame of dural tubes. This tapered in the nose into mountings for the 30 kW (40 hp) nine-cylinder Salmson 9AD radial, though this engine was slow to arrive and the first flights were made with a 34 kW (45 hp), six-cylinder Anzani 6 radial. The S.T.3 was designed to make long distance, possibly record-setting, flights and a large fuel tank was fitted within a bulbous underside. Well behind the engine there was a long, open cockpit with two seats in tandem, the forward one over the lower wing and with a cut-out in the upper wing trailing edge to improve the field of view. The S.T.3 was flown solo from the rear seat, which had a headrest in a fairing stretching back to the tail, but dual control was fitted. The forward fuselage from the engine to the rear of the cockpit was given a rounded section with dural plating but aft that form was continued by fabric covering over duralumin stringers.

The S.T.3 had conventional tail, with an elliptical plan, wire braced tailplane and elevators mounted on top of the fuselage. Its fin was triangular, carrying a rudder which ran down to the keel and worked in a small elevator cut-out.

The landing gear was fixed and conventional, with large wheels on a single axle with a track of 1.40 m (55 in). The axle was mounted via rubber cords to a V-strut on each side. Its tall wooden tailskid was also rubber cord sprung.

The uncovered fuselage of the S.T..3 was exhibited in May 1927 at the Warsaw Aviation Exhibition and the aircraft first flew in July. The Salmson engine was fitted by October when it flew in the National Lightplane Contest. By then it had a revised windscreen and faired-in undercarriage legs. Flown by Skraba, it was placed fifth of six.

It underwent a major rebuild at the start of 1928 in which the span was increased by 800 mm (31.5 in) and the length by 200 mm (7.9 in). The changes to the wing dimensions increased the wing area by 7.6%. The tail surfaces were also enlarged, the belly tank removed, upper decking lowered and the structure generally refined to decrease weight. The modified machine was complete by 12 May 1928. That September it took part in the 2nd National Lightplane Contest. It failed to improve its previous rating, coming tenth out of twelve, but it did get an official award for its short (70 m (230 ft)) landing run.

Even after the 1928 revisions the innovative S.T.3's performance was unimpressive and only one was built. Cynk claims it inspired the design of the DUS III Ptapta, another all-metal staggered biplane sports and touring aircraft.

After personal tragedy (a sudden and unexpected death of his only son) Bolesław Skraba left the aircraft industry. He died in Warsaw in 1943.

== Specifications (Salmson engine, 1927 airframe) ==
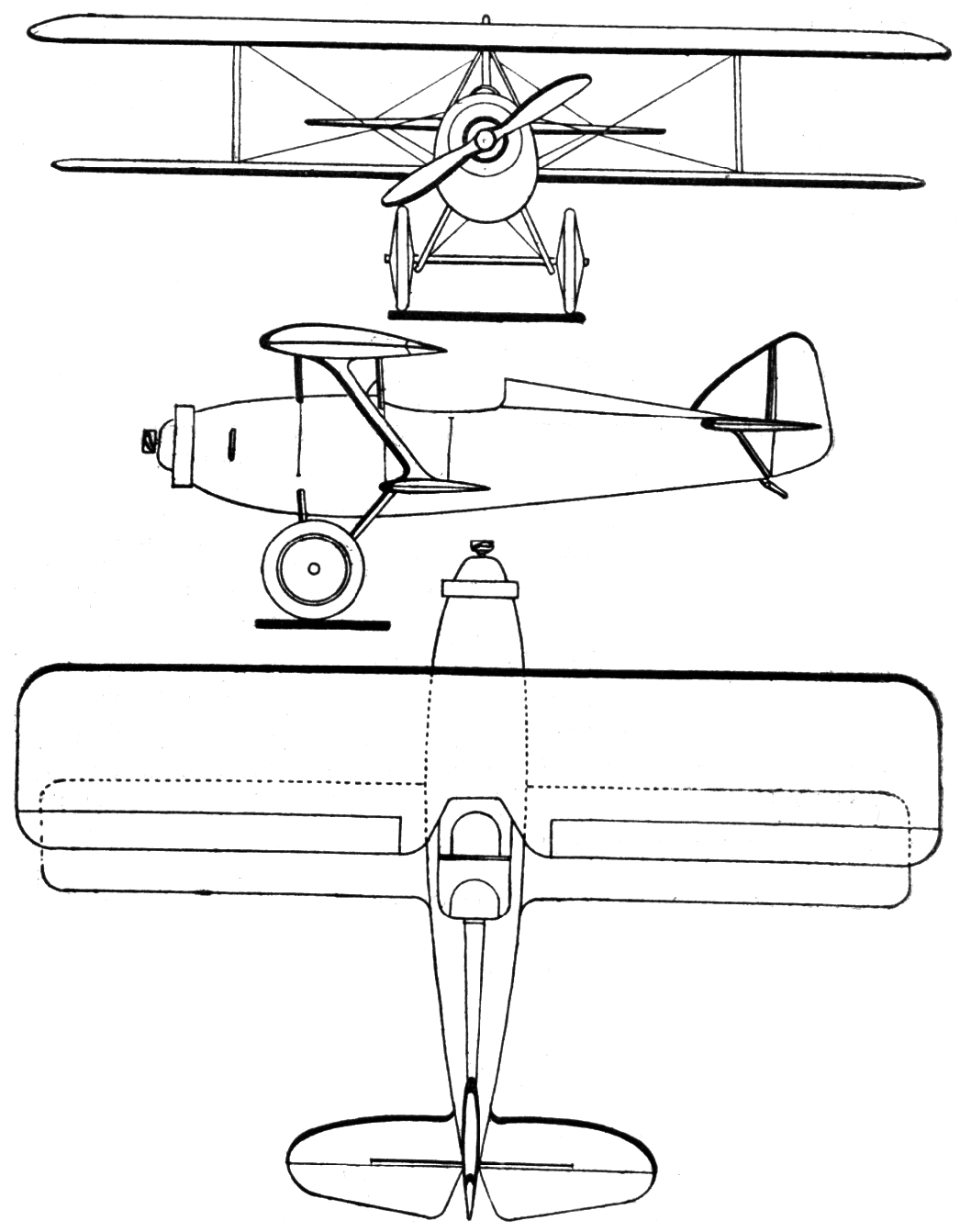
Skraba S.T.3 3-view drawing from Les Ailes February 9,1928

Data from Les Ailes, February 1928

General characteristics

- Crew: One
- Capacity: One passenger/co-pilot
- Length: 5.30 m (17 ft 5 in)
- Upper wingspan: 7.50 m (24 ft 7 in)
- Height: 2.30 m (7 ft 7 in)
- Wing area: 17 m^{2} (180 sq ft)
- Airfoil: Wytosyznski
- Empty weight: 325 kg (717 lb)
- Gross weight: 490 kg (1,080 lb)
- Max takeoff weight: 550 kg (1,213 lb)
- Fuel capacity: 180 L (40 imp gal; 48 US gal)
- Powerplant: 1 × Salmson 9AD 9-cylinder radial, 30 kW (40 hp)
- Propellers: 2-bladed wooden fixed pitch propeller

Performance

- Maximum speed: 120 km/h (75 mph, 65 kn) at 1,000 m (3,300 ft)
- Stall speed: 60 km/h (37 mph, 32 kn) minimum speed
- Endurance: normal, 4.5 h; with maximum fuel 15 h.
- Service ceiling: 2,500 m (8,200 ft)
- Time to altitude: 26 min to 1,000 m (3,300 ft); at maximum weight 47 min.
- Landing run: 70 m (230 ft)
