= Walter Vega =

1930s Czech piston aircraft engine

Vega
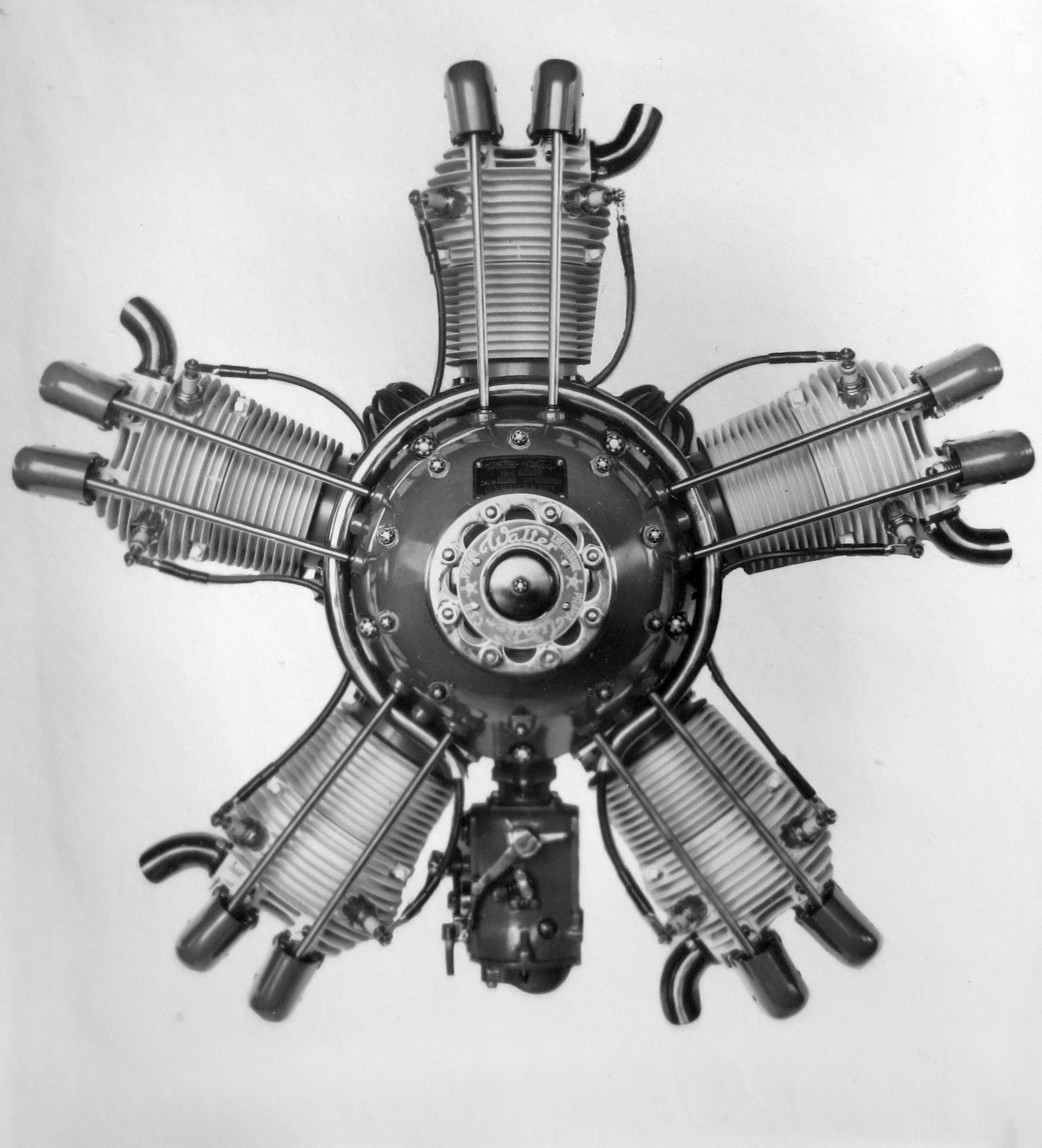
- Walter Vega, radial five-cylinder
- Type: Radial aircraft engine
- National origin: Czechoslovakia
- Manufacturer: Walter Aircraft Engines
- Designer: František Adolf Barvitius
- First run: 1929

The Walter Vega was a five-cylinder, air-cooled, radial engine for aircraft use, built in Czechoslovakia in the late 1920s.

== Applications ==
- Aero A.34
- ANBO V
- Avia BH-11
- Couzinet 22
- Fizir AF-2
- Pander E85
- PWS-8

== Specifications ==
Data from Flight.

=== General characteristics ===
- Type: five-cylinder radial engine
- Bore: 105 mm (4.1 in)
- Stroke: 120 mm (4.7 in)
- Dry weight: 102.5 kg (226 lb)
- Designer: František Adolf Barvitius

=== Components ===
- Valvetrain: Overhead valve, one inlet and one exhaust valve per cylinder
- Fuel system: Zenith Type 50J carburettor
- Fuel type: Petrol
- Oil system: Pressure and scavenge pump
- Cooling system: Air-cooled
- Reduction gear: Direct-drive

=== Performance ===
- Power output: 63 kW (85 hp) at 1,750 rpm
- Compression ratio: 5.15:1
- Power-to-weight ratio: 0.61 kW/kg (0.37 hp/lb)

== See also ==
Related lists

- List of aircraft engines
