= LKL IV =

General information
- Type: two-seat club aircraft
- National origin: Poland
- Manufacturer: Lubelski Klub Lotnitczy
- Number built: 1

History
- First flight: Autumn 1932

The LKL IV and LKL V were a pair of very similar Polish parasol wing two-seaters, built in the early 1930s. They differed primarily in their engines.

== Design and development ==
Members of the Lublin Airport Club (Lubelski Klub Lotnitczy in Polish, hence LKL) began to design a pair of parasol wing, two-seat aircraft for the Club's use in 1931. They differed chiefly in their engines and the lengths and the cowlings associated with them, though there were also undercarriage design variations. The LKL IV had a 63 kW (85 hp) aircooled, four-cylinder upright inline engine and was first flown in the autumn of 1932. The LKL V was powered by a 93 kW (125 hp) Warner Scarab seven-cylinder radial engine and flew a few weeks later.

The wooden wing was rectangular in plan out to rounded tips and was in two parts, each built around twin spars and fabric covered. They were braced by pairs of parallel faired struts from the lower fuselage longerons to the spars and the central join was held above the fuselage on a cabane of steel transverse inverted V-struts.

Because the Cirrus was an upright engine, its enclosing cowling raised the nose ahead of the cockpit, though the underside sloped upwards. A long exhaust on the port side exited low on the fuselage under the wing. The radial Scarab of the LKL V allowed a lower nose; its cylinders were enclosed by a Townend ring-type housing. Because of the more compact radial, the LKL V was 270 mm (10.6 in) shorter than the LKL IV and was also had a slightly lower (12 kg (26 lb)) empty weight. Its greater power allowed an increase of (22 kg (49 lb)) in the loaded weight. Fuel tanks were in the fuselage. Behind the engines the fuselages were rectangular in section, built around welded steel tube structures and largely fabric-covered. There were two tandem open cockpits with dual controls under the wing, which had a rounded cut-out in its trailing edge.

Their tail surfaces were fabric-covered wooden framed structures. The tailplanes were mounted on top of the slender rear fuselage and strut-braced from below and their fins were small, with a cropped triangular profile and carrying full, rounded balanced rudders. Both had divided-type, fixed, conventional landing gear with half-axles and with radius rods from the lower fuselage longerons. There were differences in the forward, shock absorbing legs; the LKL IV had oleo struts from the upper longerons and the LKL V had faired, compressed rubber legs from the bases of the forward wing struts. In 1934 the LKL IV's undercarriage was shortened, though without changing the geometry.

== Operational history ==
Both aircraft were used by the LKL for several years and flown in local competitions. Both took part in the second International Aviation meeting held in Warsaw in May 1933 where Zygmunt Martiniak flew the LKL IV into second place and in the Fifth National Lightplane Contest that September, where the LKL V, flown by Kolaxzkowski, came ninth. The LKL V continued to fly until autumn 1936.

== Variants ==
LKL IV
63 kW (85 hp) Cirrus III engine
LKL V
93 kW (125 hp) Warner Scarab engine

== Specifications (LKL IV) ==
Data from J. Cynk (1971) except where noted

General characteristics

- Crew: Ome pilot
- Capacity: One passenger
- Length: 7.12 m (23 ft 4 in)
- Wingspan: 11.6 m (38 ft 1 in)
- Wing area: 18 m^{2} (190 sq ft)
- Empty weight: 462 kg (1,019 lb)
- Gross weight: 740 kg (1,631 lb)
- Powerplant: 1 × Cirrus III 4-cylinder, air-cooled inline, 63 kW (85 hp)
- Propellers: 2-bladed

Performance

- Maximum speed: 158 km/h (98 mph, 85 kn) at sea level
- Cruise speed: 122–130 km/h (76–81 mph, 66–70 kn)
- Stall speed: 72 km/h (45 mph, 39 kn) minimum speed
- Range: 800 km (500 mi, 430 nmi)
- Service ceiling: 3,000 m (9,800 ft)
- Rate of climb: 2.5 m/s (490 ft/min)
