= Aero A.34 Kos =

A.34 Kos
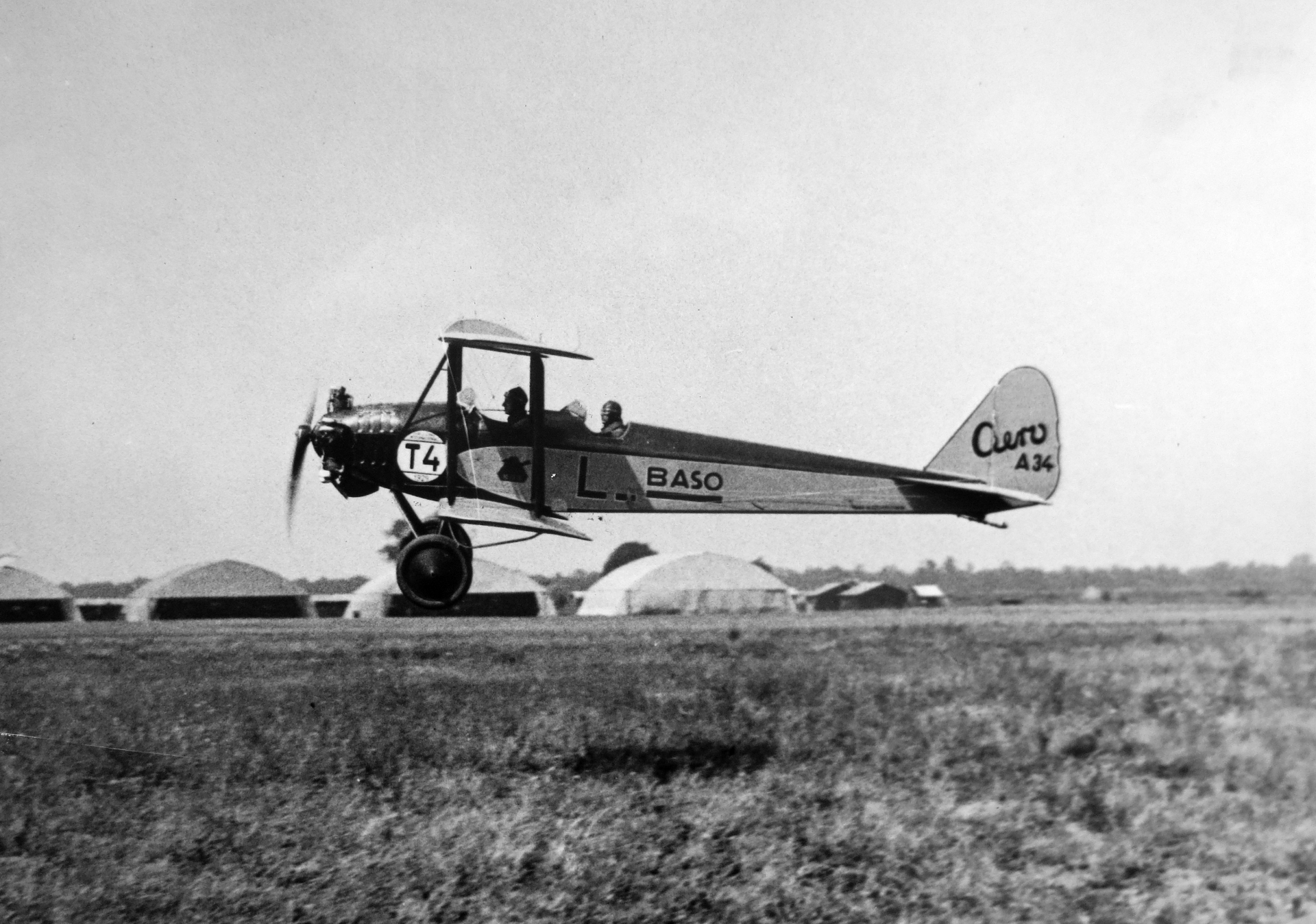
- Aircraft Aero A-34 piloted by Josef Novák (1893-1934) during the Challenge International de Tourisme 1929.

General information
- Type: Light Sport Aircraft
- National origin: Czechoslovakia
- Manufacturer: Aero Vodochody

History
- First flight: 1929

The Aero A.34 Kos (Czech: "Blackbird") was a small sports and touring biplane built in Czechoslovakia in the 1930s.

It was designed in 1929. The design was similar to the De Havilland Gipsy Moth. Of conventional biplane configuration and wooden construction, it featured wings that could be folded to allow it to be towed to and from airfields by automobile (width 2.91 m).

A prototype (registration L-BASO) had an 85 hp Walter Vega radial engine. It took part in the Challenge 1929 international contest (piloted by Josef Novak), but had to withdraw due to engine failure and crash-landing on August 8, 1929.

Seven A.34s and its variants were built by Aero, with different engines: three A.34Js had the Walter Junior engine, and three A.134s had the 100 hp Walter Venus. They were used as trainers and sports planes in Czechoslovak civilian and military aviation.

== Variants ==
- A.34
- A.34J
- A.34W : Three aircraft powered by the 105 hp (78 kW) Walter Junior inline piston engine.
- A.134 : One prototype powered by the 130 hp (97 kW) Walter NZ 85 radial piston engine.

== Specifications (A.34) ==
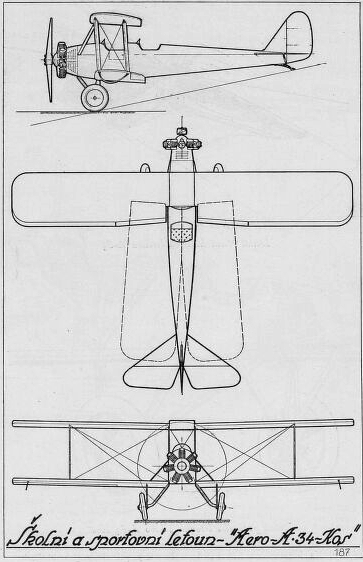
Aero A-34 Kos

General characteristics

- Crew: one
- Capacity: one passenger
- Length: 6.8 m (22 ft 4 in)
- Wingspan: 8.8 m (28 ft 10 in)
- Height: 2.5 m (8 ft 2 in)
- Wing area: 21.3 m^{2} (229 sq ft)
- Empty weight: 400 kg (882 lb)
- Gross weight: 640 kg (1,411 lb)
- Powerplant: 1 × Walter Vega five-cylinder, air-cooled, radial engine, 63 kW (84 hp)

Performance

- Maximum speed: 160 km/h (99 mph, 86 kn)
- Range: 320 km (200 mi, 170 nmi)
- Rate of climb: 2.11 m/s (416 ft/min)
- Wing loading: 30 kg/m^{2} (6.1 lb/sq ft)
- Power/mass: 100 W/kg (0.06 hp/lb)

== See also ==
Aircraft of comparable role, configuration, and era

- Caudron C.230
- De Havilland Gipsy Moth
- PZL.5
