= DUS III Ptapta =

Ptapta
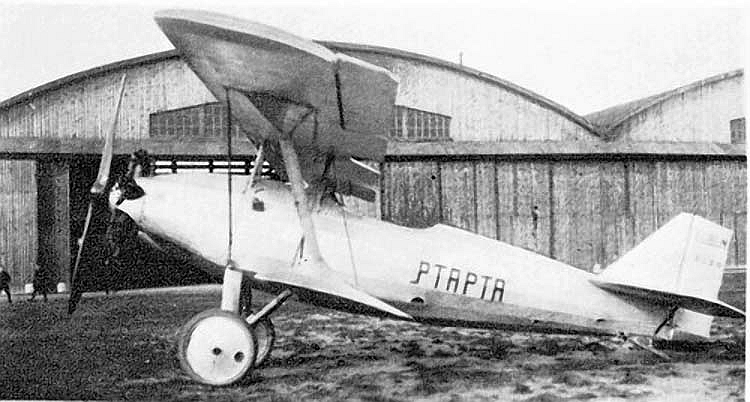

General information
- Type: Two seat sport and tourer
- National origin: Poland
- Designer: Jerzy Dabrowski and Antoni Uszacki
- Number built: 1

History
- First flight: 21 September 1928

The D.U.S. III Ptapta was a two-seat sports and touring biplane and only the second Polish aircraft using aluminium alloy construction.

== Design and development ==
The Ptapta was designed by Jerzy Dabrowski and Antoni Uszacki (hence the design group name D.U.S. or DUS) and was strongly influenced by the Skraba S.T.3, flown in 1927. In that year Dabrowski and Uszacki led a group of employees from the Plage and Laskiewicz factory, who in 1928 formed the Lubelski Klub Lotniczy (Lublian Aviation Club), referring to the Ptapta as the LKL I. The factory allowed use of their workshop and the LOPP provided funding and loaned an engine. It flew for the first time either on 21 September 1928 by Antoni Mroczkowski or 10 October. With a light load it could be flown aerobatically.

The largely aluminium-alloy framed Ptapta was a biplane with a larger span and chord upper wing. Both upper and lower wings were built around two duralumin spars, with wooden ribs and fabric covering. They were rectangular in plan apart from slightly angled tips and mounted with marked stagger. Only the upper wings carried ailerons. The upper and lower wings were braced together with a single interplane strut with flared ends on each side and the upper wing was attached to the fuselage centrally by a pair of transverse cabane inverted V-struts to the spars.

Its 45 kW (60 hp) Walter NZ 60 five-cylinder radial engine was installed, with its cylinders exposed for cooling, in a pointed nose where the oval section duralumin fuselage structure was covered in dural sheet. A long cut-out in the fuselage with dural decking ahead of it contained the two open tandem cockpits. The forward position was under the wing trailing edge, in which a cut-out provided a better field of view and eased access. Elsewhere the fuselage was fabric covered. The Ptpta's fin was triangular in profile and carried a deep, rectangular rudder. A triangular tailplane carried rectangular elevators with a cut-out for rudder movement; it was placed at the top of the fuselage and braced from below by a single strut on each side.

The Ptapta had conventional, tailskid landing gear of the divided type, with mainwheels on cranked axles from the central fuselage underside, with trailing struts acting as radius arms and vertical main legs equipped with rubber shock absorbers.

== Operational history ==
Some six weeks after its first flight the Ptapta took part in the Second National Lightplane Contest, again flown by Mroczkowski. It finished in eighth place.

In the summer of 1929 the Ptapta was modified by the removal and covering-over of the front cockpit and its replacement by a large fuel tank to allow an attempt on the lightplane distance record. The extra fuel gave a calculated range of 2,800 km (1,700 mi) though, as the record was soon broken by others, yet more fuel was required. A newer, 52 kW (70 hp), Walter NZ engine was also fitted. Before attempting the record flight the Ptapta took part in October 1929 in the First Tour of Southwestern Poland and then, flown by Władysław Szulczewski, made a trial endurance flight which was curtailed by bad weather. A record attempt was made on 30 April 1930 but ended immediately in the destruction of the very heavily loaded aircraft, which stalled on take-off from Poznań. Other accounts of this loss give different dates and places.

== Specifications (two-seater) ==
Data from Cynk, 1971 except where noted

General characteristics

- Crew: One
- Capacity: One passenger
- Length: 5.39 m (17 ft 8 in)
- Wingspan: 8 m (26 ft 3 in)
- Height: 2.14 m (7 ft 0 in)
- Wing area: 15 m^{2} (160 sq ft)
- Empty weight: 322 kg (710 lb)
- Gross weight: 566 kg (1,248 lb) normal loaded
- Powerplant: 1 × Walter NZ 60 5-cylinder radial, 45 kW (60 hp) rated power; 48 kW (65 hp) for take-off
- Propellers: 2-bladed

Performance

- Maximum speed: 160 km/h (99 mph, 86 kn)
- Cruise speed: 140 km/h (87 mph, 76 kn)
- Service ceiling: 2,300 m (7,500 ft)
- Time to altitude: 1,763 m (5,784 ft) 30 min
- Landing Speed: 65 km/h (40 mph)
