= Albert TE.1 =

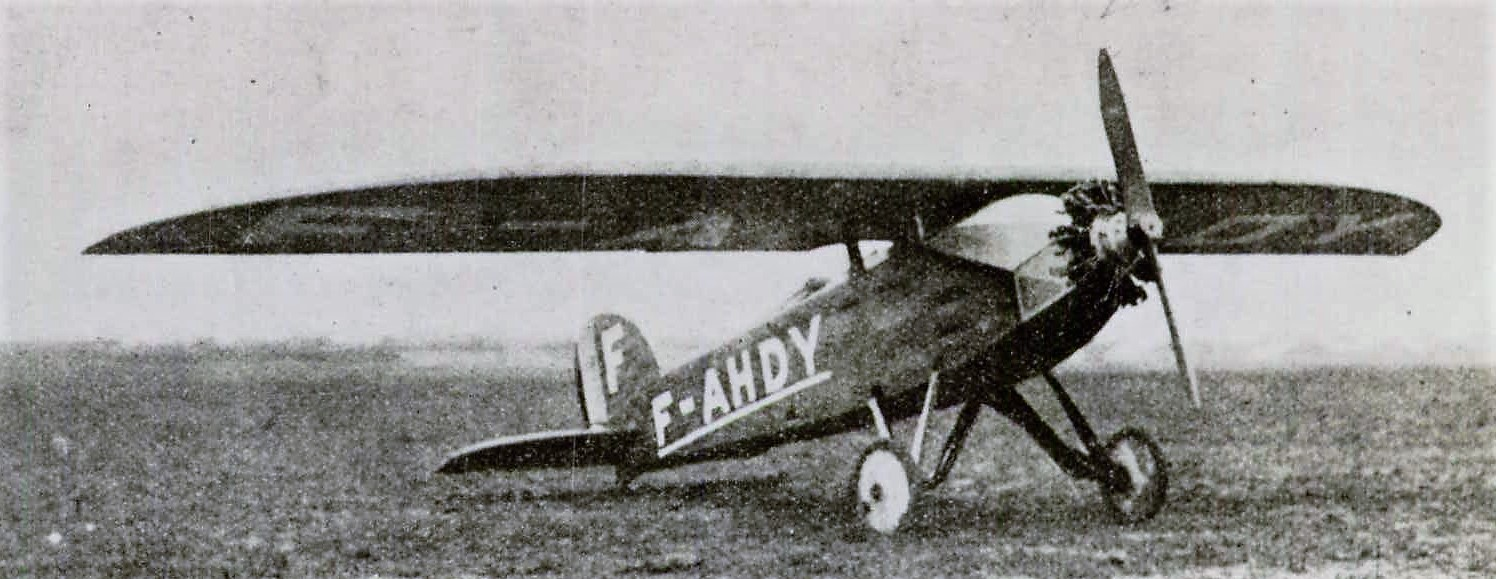

General information
- Type: Light sports aircraft
- National origin: France
- Manufacturer: Avions Albert
- Designer: Robert Duhamel
- Number built: at least 4

History
- First flight: by autumn 1925

The Albert TE.1 was a single seat cantilever parasol wing monoplane, wood framed and skinned and built in France in 1926. It made some notable long flights, set a French altitude record for its class and proved a practical light aircraft.

== Design and development ==
During the early 1920s, considerable effort across northern Europe went into the development of very small and economical aircraft, exemplified for example by those at the British Lympne light aircraft trials and at the 1925 meeting at Vauville. Despite some progress with, for example, the Pander D or the Caudron C.109, suitable engines were few; aircraft could take off on as little as 15 kW (20 hp) but not do much more and available 45 kW (60 hp) units were heavy. Albert Aviation decided that the 30 kW (40 hp) Salmson 9 AD nine-cylinder air-cooled radial engine was the best compromise.

In 1926 this engine was installed in a small, single seat aircraft called the Albert TE.1, designed by Robert Duhamel, this aircraft had previously flown in 1925 powered by a 30 kW (40 hp) water-cooled Vaslin V 6 B V6 engine, which had a square radiator on the nose. The TE, or Te in the designation acknowledged the use of multi-layer mahogany skinning methods developed by Alphonse Tellier and widely applied to the construction of early monocoque fuselages. It had a cantilever, one-piece parasol wing built around two wooden box spars, covered with plywood. In plan its trailing edge was straight and unswept and over the inner 50% of the span the leading edge was parallel to it; in the outboard portion the leading edge was curved elliptically. The wing was attached to the raised centre of the fuselage and braced to each fuselage side with a pair of very short struts. With only six attachment points, involving twelve bolts, it was easy to separate wing and fuselage for transport. Narrow, long-span ailerons filled more than two-thirds of the trailing edge; these were operated by control rods, rather than wires.

The fuselage was constructed from spruce and ply box girders and was ply covered, with flat sides and bottom and a pitched top. The engine was mounted uncowled on a steel tube frame and the open single cockpit was half under the trailing edge, allowing clear views above and below the wing. Its empennage was conventional and of similar construction to the wing; the tailplane was mounted at mid-fuselage and had a plan similar to that of the wing, with full span, narrow chord elevators controlled by rods. The vertical fin was quadrant shaped and carried a cable controlled semi-circular rudder that extended down as far as the tailplane.

The TE.1 had a wide-track (1,550 mm (61 in)) tailskid undercarriage with mainwheels on faired, cranked half-axles hinged from the central fuselage underside, their ends independently bungee sprung from the vertices of faired V-struts from the lower fuselage longerons. Its tailskid was a double cantilever steel leaf spring.

The exact date of the first flight of the TE.1 remains uncertain but it had completed its official testing at Villacoublay before April 1926. It was economical, with an optimum fuel consumption of about 16 km/L or 45 mpg, and was fully aerobatic. It was proposed as a potential single-seat trainer, a mail plane or a military communications aircraft; it could also be equipped with a machine gun "in place of cavalry".

Three different Albert TE.1s were at the two Orly light plane contests and another was built under licence in the U.S.

There is a report from the 1928 Orly event that Avions Albert were constructing a more powerful version, the Albert TE.2. It had a 95 hp (71 kW) engine and seated two, side by side, for training. It is not known if this aircraft was completed.

== Operational history ==
In the summer of 1926 Thoret flew a TE.1 on two notable out and return flights. The first, flown in six stages, each lasting between five and nine hours, was from Paris (Villacoublay) to Venice. He left on 5 June 1926 and returned eleven days later after flying some 2,500 km (1,600 mi) and crossing the Alps at 3,000 m (9,800 ft). The following month he flew from Paris to Warsaw, leaving on 16 July and arriving, via Prague, the next day. Early next morning he took off for Paris, returning non-stop in just over ten hours and ending a round trip of 3,000 km (1,900 mi).

The same aircraft, along with another TE.1, was amongst eight contestants in the Concours d'Avions Économiques or light-plane contest held at Orly between 9–15 August 1926. The aim was to decide the most practical of the five different types, including ease of folding/wing detachment for road transport, the ability to accommodate parachutes and fire protection, as well as performance (take off distance, climb, speed) and fuel efficiency; more controversial was an economy coefficient which deliberately enhanced the final scores of two-seaters on the grounds of their greater practicality. The two Albert machines were the fastest present and were placed first and second before the economy coefficient was applied, after which they fell behind the two two-seat Avia BH-11s into third and fourth place.

There was another Orly light aircraft meeting in 1928, in which a different TE.1 participated. Again it was handicapped against two-seaters and was only at mid-table before the final reliability test, which it failed to complete.

On 20 June 1927 a TE.1, flown by Albert, set a French altitude record in the lightplane class at 5,535 m (18,159 ft).

== Specifications (Salmson engine) ==
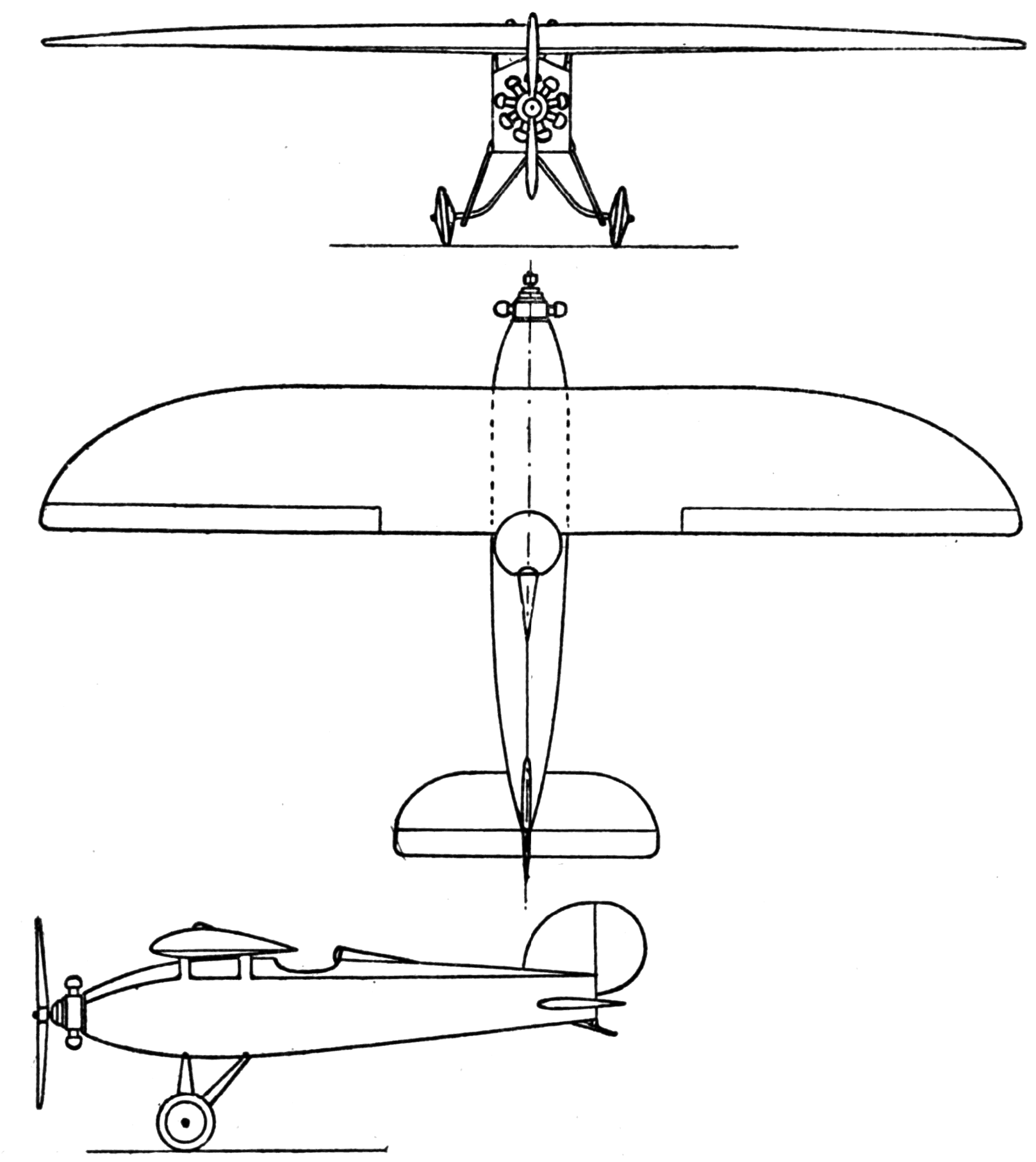
Albert TE.1 3-view drawing from L'Aéronautique April,1926

At Orly, 1928

Data from L'Aérophile (1926), Jane's all the World's Aircraft 1928, Aviafrance:Albert TE.1

General characteristics

- Crew: one
- Length: 5.50 m (18 ft 1 in)
- Wingspan: 8.80 m (28 ft 10 in)
- Height: 1.98 m (6 ft 6 in)
- Wing area: 10 m^{2} (110 sq ft)
- Empty weight: 255 kg (562 lb)
- Gross weight: 387 kg (853 lb)
- Fuel capacity: 44 kg (97 lb)
- Powerplant: 1 × Salmson 9 AD 9-cylinder radial, 30 kW (40 hp) 40 CV at 2,000 rpm
- Propellers: 2-bladed Duhamel fixed pitch propeller

Performance

- Maximum speed: 150 km/h (93 mph, 81 kn) at ground level
- Cruise speed: 105 km/h (65 mph, 57 kn) economical
- Range: 1,000 km (620 mi, 540 nmi)
- Service ceiling: 5,500 m (18,000 ft) theoretical
- Time to altitude: 13 min 32 sec to 2,000 m (6,600 ft)
- Wing loading: 39.2 kg/m^{2} (8.0 lb/sq ft)
- Thrust/weight: 0.0761 kW/kg (0.0463 hp/lb)
- Take-off distance: 98 m (320 ft)
- Landing run: 88 m (290 ft)

== Bibliography ==
- Cortet, Pierre (December 1997). "Rétros du Mois" [Retros of the Month]. Avions: Toute l'aéronautique et son histoire (in French) (57): 5. ISSN 1243-8650.
