= Walter NZ 60 =

1920s Czech piston aircraft engine

NZ 60
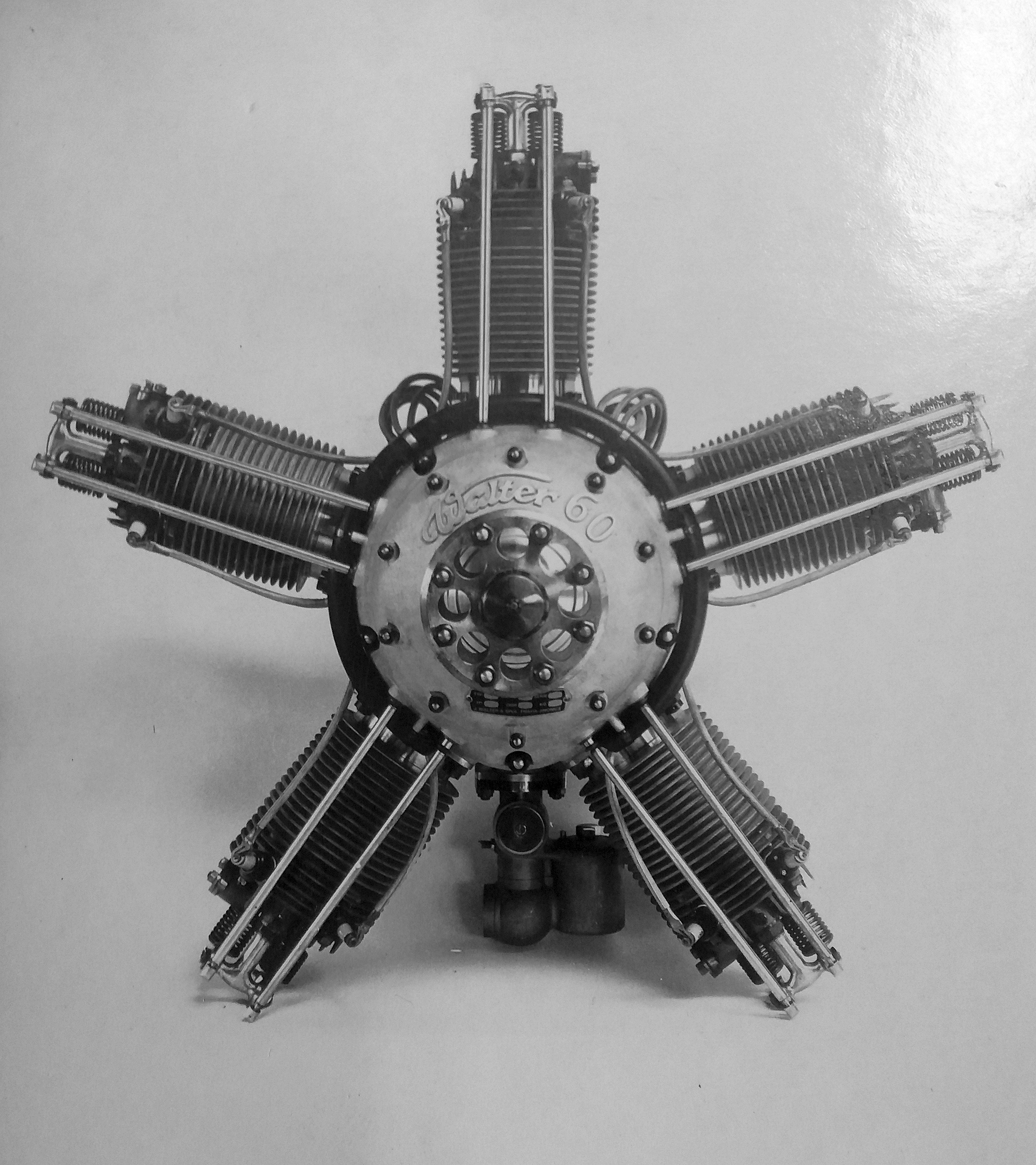
- Walter NZ 60
- Type: Radial aero engine
- National origin: Czechoslovakia
- Manufacturer: Walter Aircraft Engines
- First run: 1920s

The Walter NZ 60 was a five-cylinder, air-cooled, radial engine for aircraft use built in Czechoslovakia by Walter Aircraft Engines in the 1920s.

== Applications ==
- Albert A-20
- ANBO II
- Avia BH-9
- Avia BH-10
- Avia BH-11
- Avia BH-12
- DUS III Ptapta
- Gribovsky G-8
- Kalinin K-9
- Pander E

== Specifications ==
=== General characteristics ===
- Type: 5-cylinder air-cooled radial
- Bore: 105 mm (4.1 in)
- Stroke: 120 mm (4.7 in)
- Displacement: 5.2 L (317 cu in)
- Dry weight: 100 kg (220 lb)

=== Performance ===
- Power output: 45 kW (60 hp) at 1,400 rpm

== See also ==
Related lists

- List of aircraft engines
