= Walter Venus =

1920s Czech piston aircraft engine

Venus
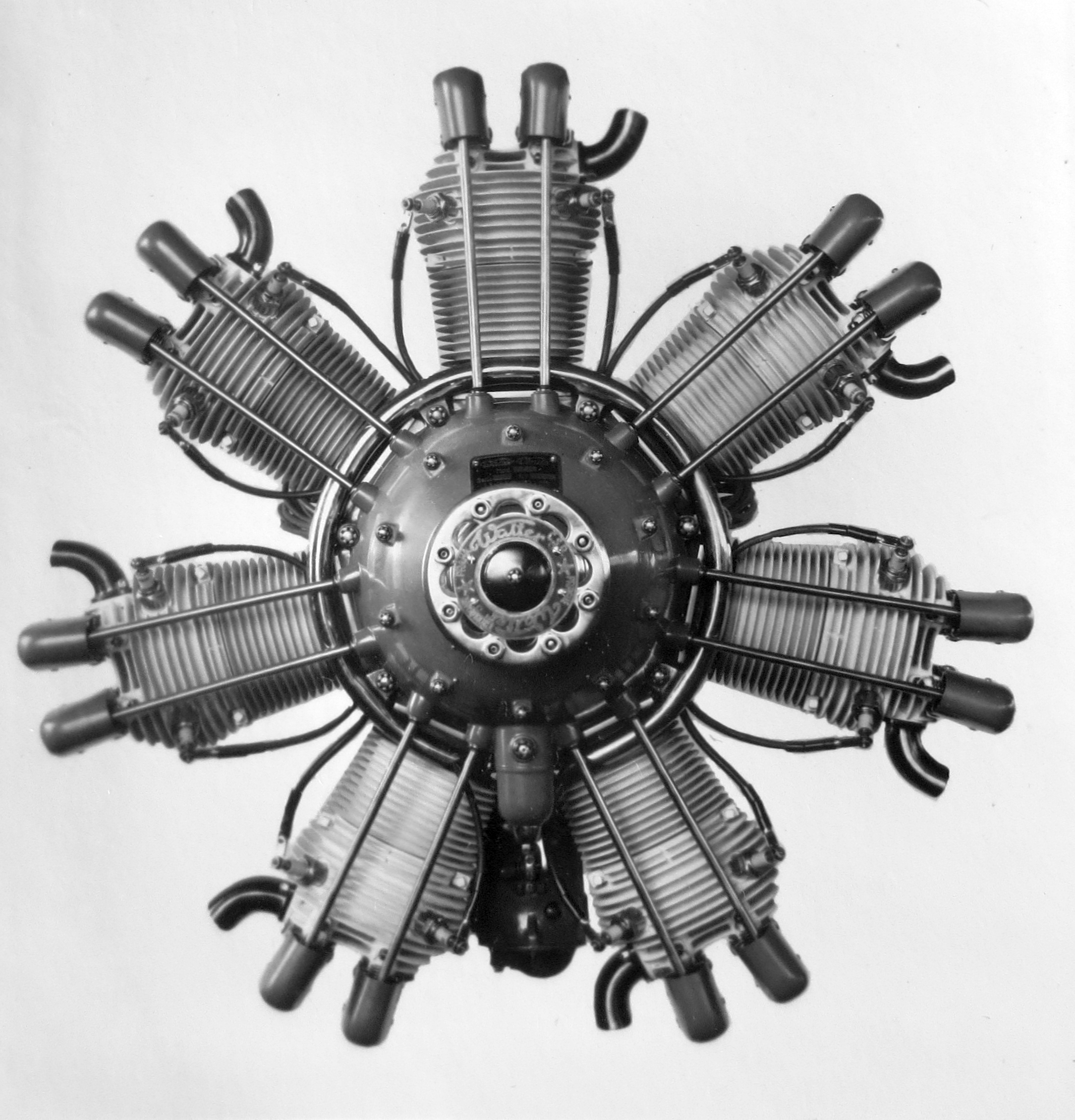
- Type: Radial aircraft engine
- National origin: Czechoslovakia
- Manufacturer: Walter Aircraft Engines
- First run: 1929

The Walter Venus was a seven-cylinder, air-cooled, radial engine for aircraft use, built in Czechoslovakia in the late 1920s.

== Applications ==
- Aero A.34
- ANBO V
- Savoia-Marchetti S.56A

== Specifications ==
Data from Flight.

=== General characteristics ===
- Type: seven-cylinder radial engine
- Bore: 105 mm (4.1 in)
- Stroke: 120 mm (4.7 in)
- Dry weight: 178 kg (393 lb)

=== Components ===
- Valvetrain: Overhead valve, one inlet and one exhaust valve per cylinder
- Fuel system: Zenith Type 50J carburettor
- Fuel type: Petrol
- Oil system: Pressure and scavenge pump
- Cooling system: Air-cooled
- Reduction gear: Direct-drive

=== Performance ===
- Power output: 82 kW (110 hp) at 1,750 rpm
- Compression ratio: 5.15:1
- Power-to-weight ratio: 0.46 kW/kg (0.28 hp/lb)

== See also ==
Related lists

- List of aircraft engines
