= Avia BH-5 =

BH-5
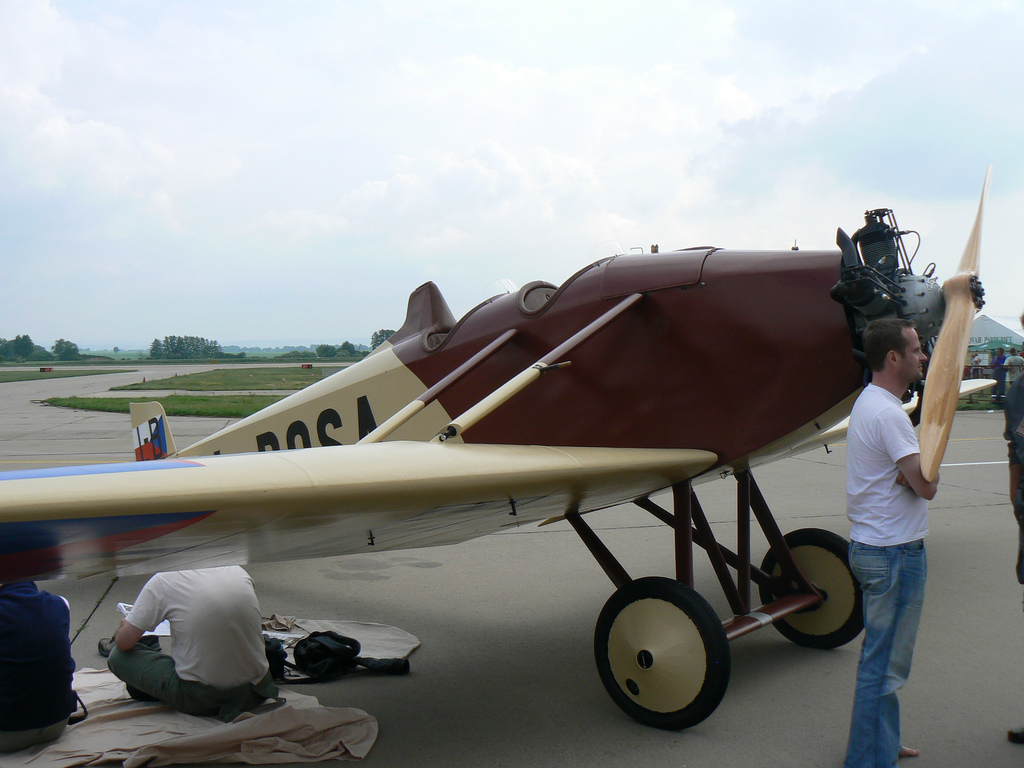

General information
- Type: Sports plane
- National origin: Czechoslovakia
- Manufacturer: Avia
- Designer: Pavel Beneš and Miroslav Hajn
- Number built: 1

History
- First flight: 1923

The Avia BH-5 was a two-seat sport aircraft built in Czechoslovakia in 1923. It was based on the firm's experience with the BH-1 and shared that aircraft's basic design: a low-wing, braced monoplane. As a result of its L-BOSA registration, all slow flying Avia monoplanes of the BH-5 lineage (BH-5 through to BH-12) were nicknamed Boska. The BH-5 was flown competitively by Zdeněk Lhota at the Belgian Touring Aircraft Contest in Brussels in 1923, and won both the overall prize for the event and the King of Belgium Prize. The same year, it won the first prize in its class in the Czechoslovak President of the Republic Competition.

On 1 June 2007, a replica (OK-BOS) built by Marcel Sezemský and members of Historická letka Republiky československé, completed its first flight from Mladá Boleslav in the Czech Republic. The engine used is an original 1923 Walter NZ 60 five-cylinder unit.

== Specifications ==
General characteristics

- Crew: one pilot
- Capacity: one passenger
- Length: 6.56 m (21 ft 6 in)
- Wingspan: 9.70 m (31 ft 10 in)
- Wing area: 13.5 m^{2} (145 sq ft)
- Empty weight: 337 kg (743 lb)
- Gross weight: 575 kg (1,268 lb)
- Powerplant: 1 × Anzani radial , 52 kW (70 hp)

Performance

- Maximum speed: 150 km/h (94 mph, 82 kn)
- Range: 480 km (300 mi, 260 nmi)
- Rate of climb: 2.5 m/s (550 ft/min)
