= Eduardo Barrón =

Spanish pilot and aeronautical engineer

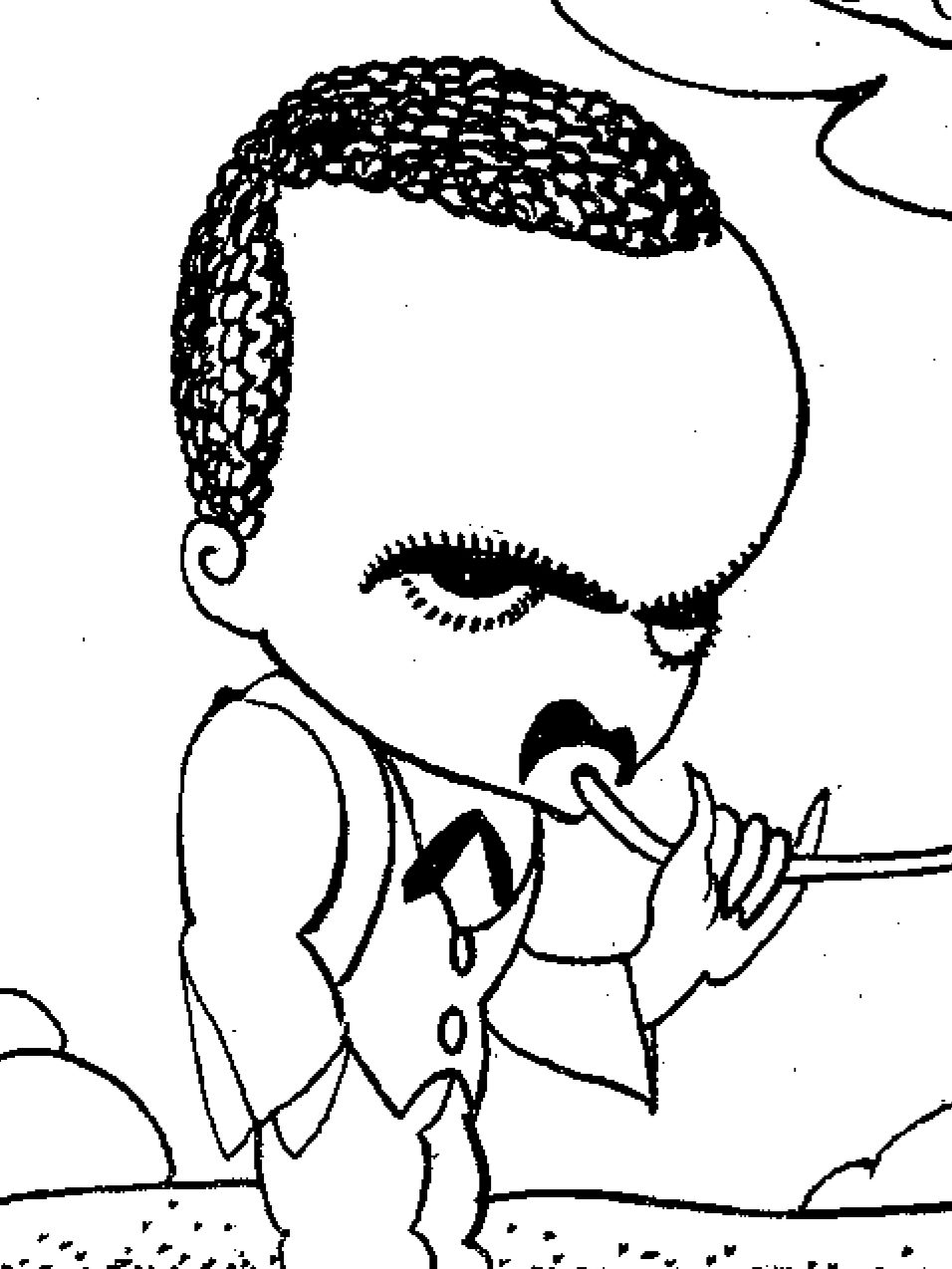
- Born: 7 September 1888; Matanzas, Cuba
- Died: 13 January 1949 (aged 60); Madrid
- Engineering career
- Projects: Barron Flecha; Barron W Loring R-I; Loring R-III
- Awards: Order of Charles III

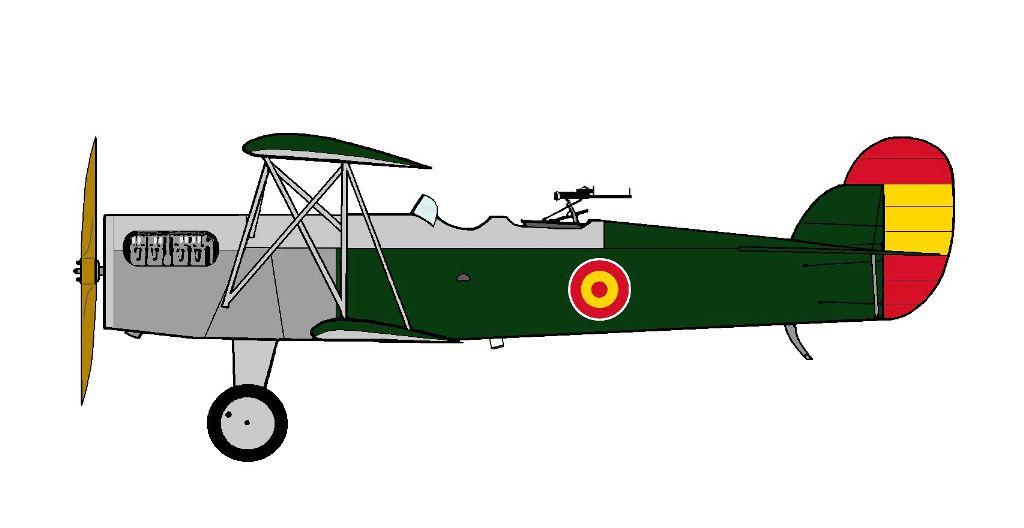
Loring R-1, the first aircraft designed by Barrón for Talleres Loring that was produced in significant numbers.

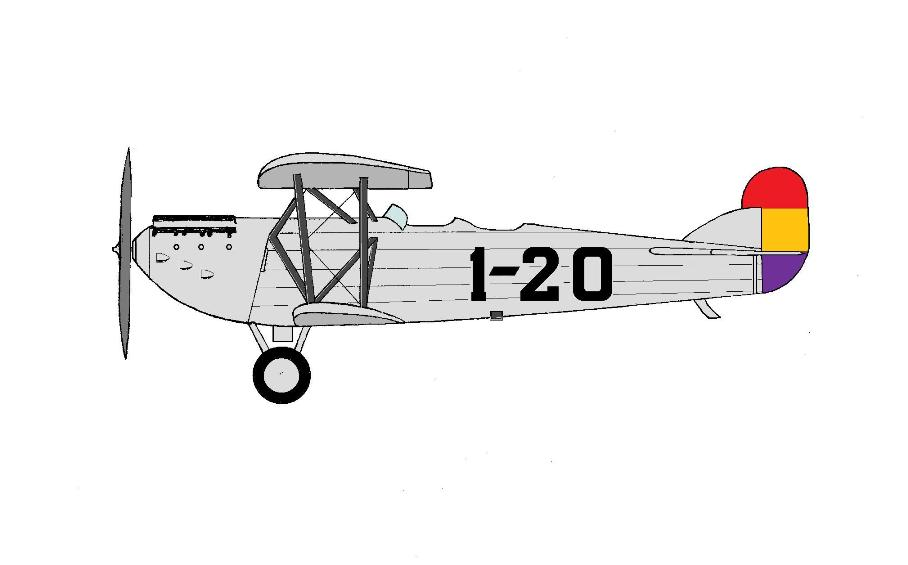
The Loring R-3, the most successful plane designed by Barrón.

Eduardo Barrón (full name Eduardo Barrón y Ramos de Sotomayor; 7 September 1888 – 13 January 1949) was a Spanish aeronautical engineer and military pilot who led the design department at Talleres Loring from 1923 to 1930.

== Biography ==
Eduardo Barrón was born in a village in Colonial Cuba. His family moved to Spain towards the turn of the century, settling in Madrid. He studied at the Academy of Military Engineering of Guadalajara in 1902, becoming an apprentice lieutenant in 1907. Barrón was posted to the Compañía de Aeroestación y Alumbrado en Campaña aerostat section in 1908 under Colonel Vives, becoming a certified balloon pilot in July 1909. His unit was transferred to Spanish North Africa where he took part in the local military campaigns between 1909 and 1910.

In 1911 Barrón was transferred back to peninsular Spain where he was selected to become an aircraft pilot, together with pioneering Spanish military airmen Alfredo Kindelán, Emilio Herrera, Enrique Arrillaga and José Ortiz Echagüe. Barrón became the second person to pass the first military pilot training course in Spain. The following year he was promoted to captain of the newly created Aeronautics section that was separated from the aerostat section under the orders of Alfredo Kindelán.

In 1913 Barrón was posted to the Tétouan aerodrome, where he was in charge of the Lohner B.I aircraft newly bought from Austria-Hungary. He carried out reconnaissance and light bombing in the Tétouan area as leader of the group.

=== Early aircraft development ===
In 1914 Barrón was transferred to Cuatro Vientos near Madrid in order to become involved in aircraft construction at the new military aircraft workshop. He modified the Lohner biplanes producing a new model that would be known as Barrón Flecha, credited to be the first step of the Spanish aeronautical industry. The plane made its first flight in April 1915, following which he fitted the Flecha with a more powerful 140 hp Hispano-Suiza motor for a demonstration flight before King Alfonso XIII on 27 July. Following the successful demonstration the Carde y Escoriaza company, based in Saragossa, was commissioned to build twelve Flecha planes that would not be ready until 1916.

Barrón continued modifying the Flecha prototype, producing a new Hispano-Suiza-fitted model which had improved visibility for the pilot and which he named Barrón W. Subsequently, twelve Barrón W were built at the Cuatro Vientos workshops. After a visit to France, where he studied in depth the building of the SPAD S.VII, he built a version of the same plane that he would designate España, also fitted with a Hispano-Suiza motor. The Loring Pujol y Cia company in Barcelona was commissioned with building twelve units of the Barrón España, but these never entered active service owing to serious construction flaws.

In 1917 Barrón, left the military in order to lead the aviation section of 'La Hispano', a subsidiary company of Hispano-Suiza. He designed a reconnaissance and a fighter plane for the company in 1918, the Hispano Barrón. However, the stock of cheap and more technologically advanced World War I planes available at the end of the conflict foreclosed any incentive for the development of a local aircraft industry for the time being.

Barrón returned to the military profession in 1920 and was posted to the Tablada Aerodrome near Seville. In August 1921 he became commander and was transferred back to Cuatro Vientos in order to take charge of the direction of the workshops and stores (Talleres y Almacenes). In 1922 he was transferred again to Seville as chief of the military airbase and in October the same year he married Matilde de la Vega y Martínez de Mora.

=== Engineer at Loring and retirement ===
Barrón returned to Cuatro Vientos in order to become chief engineer at a newly built aeronautical factory, Talleres Loring, which had won a contract to produce Fokker C.IV reconnaissance planes under licence.

While at Loring Barrón designed and tested his own planes in flight, beginning with the Loring RB military surveillance aircraft, an obscure monoplane prototype of which there are no data. Meanwhile, General Primo de Rivera took power and began a dictatorship that sought to protect and promote local industries. Thanks to this support, Barrón's following project, the Loring R.I reconnaissance and light bomber, went into production and thirty units were built for the Aeronáutica Militar of the Spanish Army. Based on this plane he designed and developed the Loring R-III, an aircraft of similar characteristics powered by a Hispano-Suiza 12Hb, which went into production with a total of 110 units built. These were delivered to the Aeronáutica Militar beginning in 1929, still during Primo de Rivera's dictatorship.

Meanwhile, and despite the favorable situation the Spanish aeronautical industry enjoyed, other planes designed by Barrón remained in the prototype stage. Among these the following deserve mention: the Loring R-II, the Loring C-I fighter, the Loring T.1 trainer, and the Loring E.II light plane powered by an Elizalde A6 110 hp radial engine. A modified E.II, named La Pepa and fitted with a Kinner K-5 motor, would be used by Fernando Rein Loring (1902-1978) in his solo flight from Madrid to Manila in 1932.

By 1930 Barrón suffered a stroke followed by hemiplegia and had to interrupt all professional activity at Loring Aeronautical Works. A prototype was built of his Loring T-3 three-engined commercial monoplane, also known as Barrón Colonial in 1931, but other designs, including the Loring B-2 a 4,000 kg payload bomber powered by six engines, remained in the project stage.

=== Later life ===
In 1931 Eduardo Barrón applied for retirement and obtained from the newly installed Spanish Republican government a substantial pension. Barrón also finally was granted the aeronautical engineer title by the Republic, for until then he had been carrying out his successful engineering work without being academically certified. Around that time the Loring company began to face financial difficulties in the wake of the Great Depression and it became an uphill task for Jorge Loring to finance Barrón's more ambitious aircraft projects.

Barrón moved to Seville, his wife's town, in 1933 where he lived in semi-retirement. In July 1936, at the outbreak of the Spanish Civil War, he was commissioned by General Queipo de Llano to adapt local industries to the war effort. At the end of the civil war, he was promoted to the rank of colonel of the Corps of Aeronautical Engineers. In 1944 he was given the largely ceremonial post of inspector at the Dirección General de Industria y Material, and had to move to Madrid, ascending to the rank of general in 1945. He died in Madrid in 1949, following a new stroke.

== Bibliography ==
- Warleta Carrillo, José. Eduardo Barrón y Ramos de Sotomayor, in Aeroplano. Revista de Historia Aeronáutica, nº 6. Marzo 1989. p. 64 and foll.
- Permuy López, Rafael Angel y González Serrano, José Luis. Aviación Militar Española, editorial Tikal, Madrid, 2010, p. 13 and foll. ISBN 9788499280660

== See also ==
- List of Interwar military aircraft
