= Adaro Chirta =

1935 Spanish trainer aircraft

Chirta
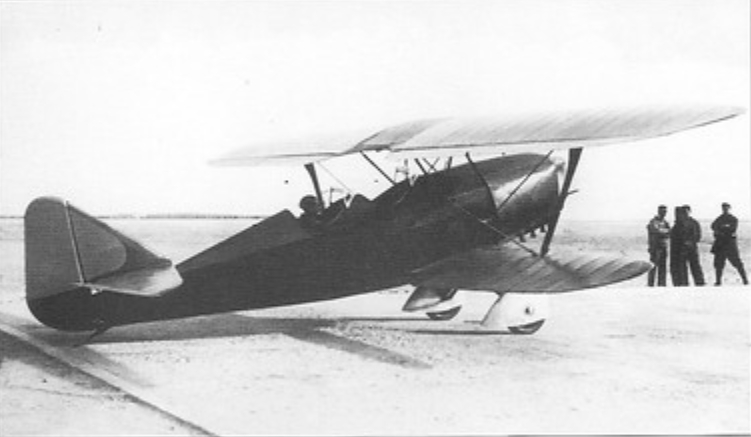
- Adaro Chirta (Lei Ailes 1935)

General information
- Type: Trainer
- National origin: Spain
- Manufacturer: Adaro
- Designer: Julio Adaro Tarradillos
- Number built: 1

History
- First flight: early 1935

The Adaro 1.E.7 Chirta was a Spanish military trainer aircraft built shortly before the outbreak of the Spanish Civil War.

== Design and development ==
Designed in 1934 in response to a Spanish Air Force requirement as part of its modernisation programme, the Chirta was a conventional sesquiplane, constructed of wood and metal and seating the student and instructor in tandem open cockpits. Slightly tapered wings had ailerons only on the upper wings; unusually, these covered the full span. Fuel was carried in an upper wing tank. There was a cut-out in the trailing edge of the upper wing for better upward visibility from the rear seat; the front seat was under the wing. A triangular fin carried a slightly rounded, unbalanced rudder. The tailskid undercarriage had faired wheels on V-form main legs. The Chirta was intended to undertake fighter training and to be fully aerobatic.

Though the exact date of the first flight of the Chirta is not known, by early July 1935 it was flying and sufficiently developed to have taken part in competitive trials for the trainer contract. It was evaluated against the Gil-Pazó GP-1 and Hispano E-34 but was ranked third, so no production contract was awarded. No further examples were built, though the prototype survived undamaged until at least November 1936, when Francoist forces captured Cuatro Vientos, where the trials had taken place.

== Specifications ==
Data from Les Ailes 23 May 1935,

General characteristics

- Crew: 2
- Length: 6.50 m (21 ft 4 in)
- Wingspan: 10.00 m (32 ft 10 in)
- Height: 2.5 m (8 ft 2 in)
- Wing area: 20 m^{2} (220 sq ft)
- Empty weight: 450 kg (992 lb)
- Gross weight: 720 kg (1,587 lb)
- Fuel capacity: 150 L (33 imp gal; 40 US gal)
- Powerplant: 1 × Walter Junior 4-cylinder, air cooled inverted inline piston, 75 kW (100 hp)
- Propellers: 2-bladed

Performance

- Maximum speed: 180 km/h (110 mph, 97 kn)
- Cruise speed: 150 km/h (93 mph, 81 kn)
- Stall speed: 70 km/h (43 mph, 38 kn)
- Minimum control speed: 70 km/h (43 mph, 38 kn)
- Range: 1,000 km (620 mi, 540 nmi)
- Service ceiling: 5,000 m (16,000 ft)
- Take-off distance: 70 m (230 ft)
- Landing run: 60 m (200 ft)
