= Aeronáutica Industrial S.A. =

Spanish aeronautical company

- Industry: Aeronautics, defence
- Founded: 1934
- Founder: Jorge Loring Martinez
- Defunct: 1995
- Fate: Merged
- Successor: CASA
- Headquarters: Spain
- Products: Aircraft

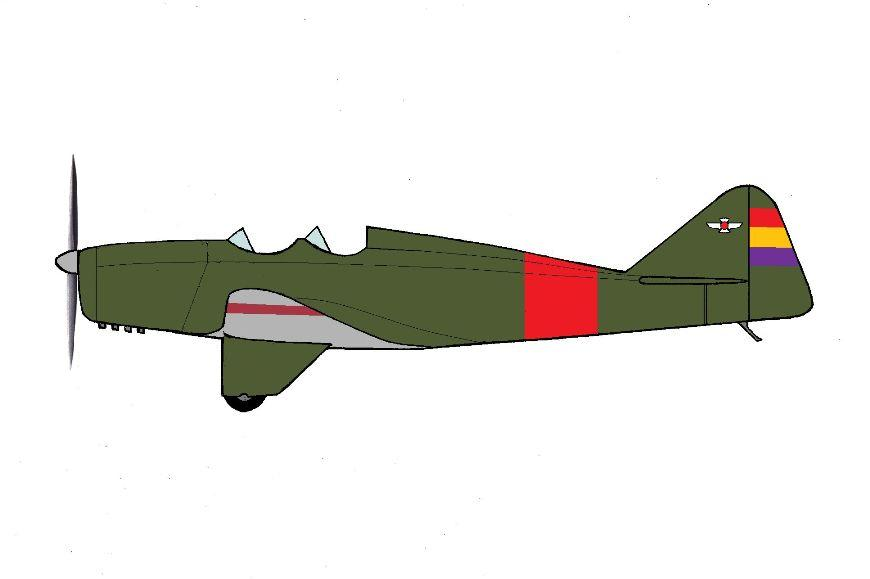
González Gil-Pazó GP-1 trainer of the Spanish Republican Air Force.

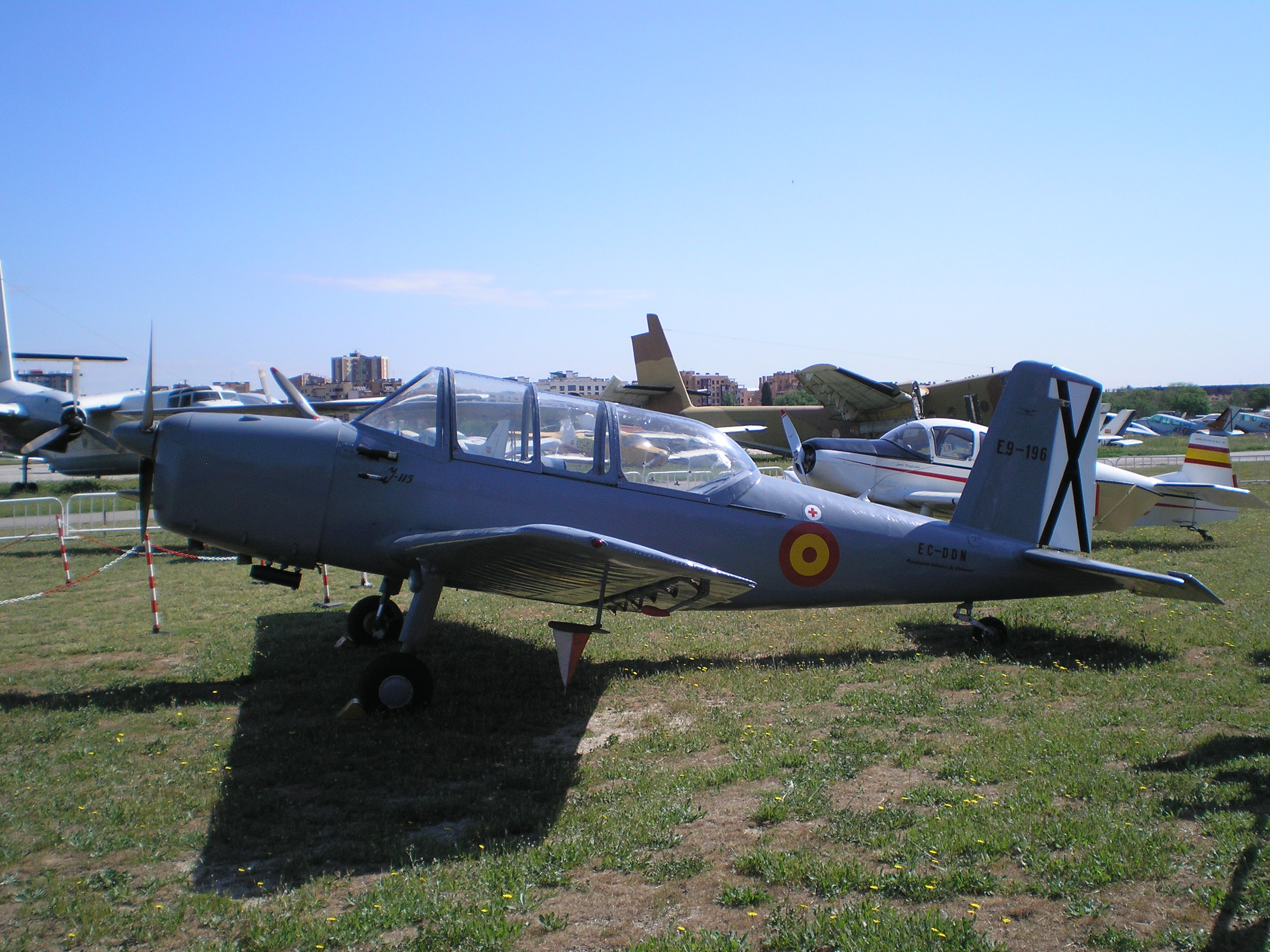
AISA I-115 of the Spanish Air Force.

Aeronáutica Industrial S.A. is a Spanish aeronautical company. The predecessor company, Talleres Loring had been founded by Jorge Loring in 1923.

== History ==
The predecessor company was founded by Jorge Loring Martinez in Cuatro Vientos near Madrid in 1924. Aeronáutica Industrial S.A. was established in 1934 and through the course of the 20th century manufactured a number of light aircraft designs including Cierva autogyros.

In 1954, AISA purchased Spanish manufacturer Iberavia and took over the I-11 light plane project, eventually building around 400 examples. For a time it specialised in the maintenance and upgrading of helicopters. In 1982 it attempted, unsuccessfully, to market an autogyro design of its own, the GN.

The company was bought by CASA in 1995, but continues to operate under its own name.

== List of Aircraft ==
- González Gil-Pazó No. 1 (1931), tandem two-seat low wing trainer.
- González Gil-Pazó GP-1 (1934), development of No. 1 with improved fuselage and wing. 100 ordered by Spanish Republican Air Force, but only 40 built due to the Spanish Civil War.
- González Gil-Pazó GP-2 (1935) GP-1 with enclosed cockpit and modified fuselage.
- González Gil-Pazó GP-4
- INTA HM.1 (1943), tandem two-seat low wing trainer, also known as Huarte Mendicoa HM-1 after its designer.
- Iberavia I-11 (1951) - single-engine trainer/touring aircraft with fixed tricycle undercarriage and side-by-side seating. Two prototypes built
- AISA I-11B (1952) AISA production version of I-11, with smaller canopy and tailwheel undercarriage used by civil aviation clubs and the Spanish Air Force.
- AISA I-115 "E-6" (1950s) I-11B variant with revised fuselage for tandem seating used by the Spanish Air Force

  AISA AVD-12 First flight 18.08.1954 

- AISA GN (1982) single-engine four-seat autogyro prototype. One built
