= AISA I-115 =

I-115
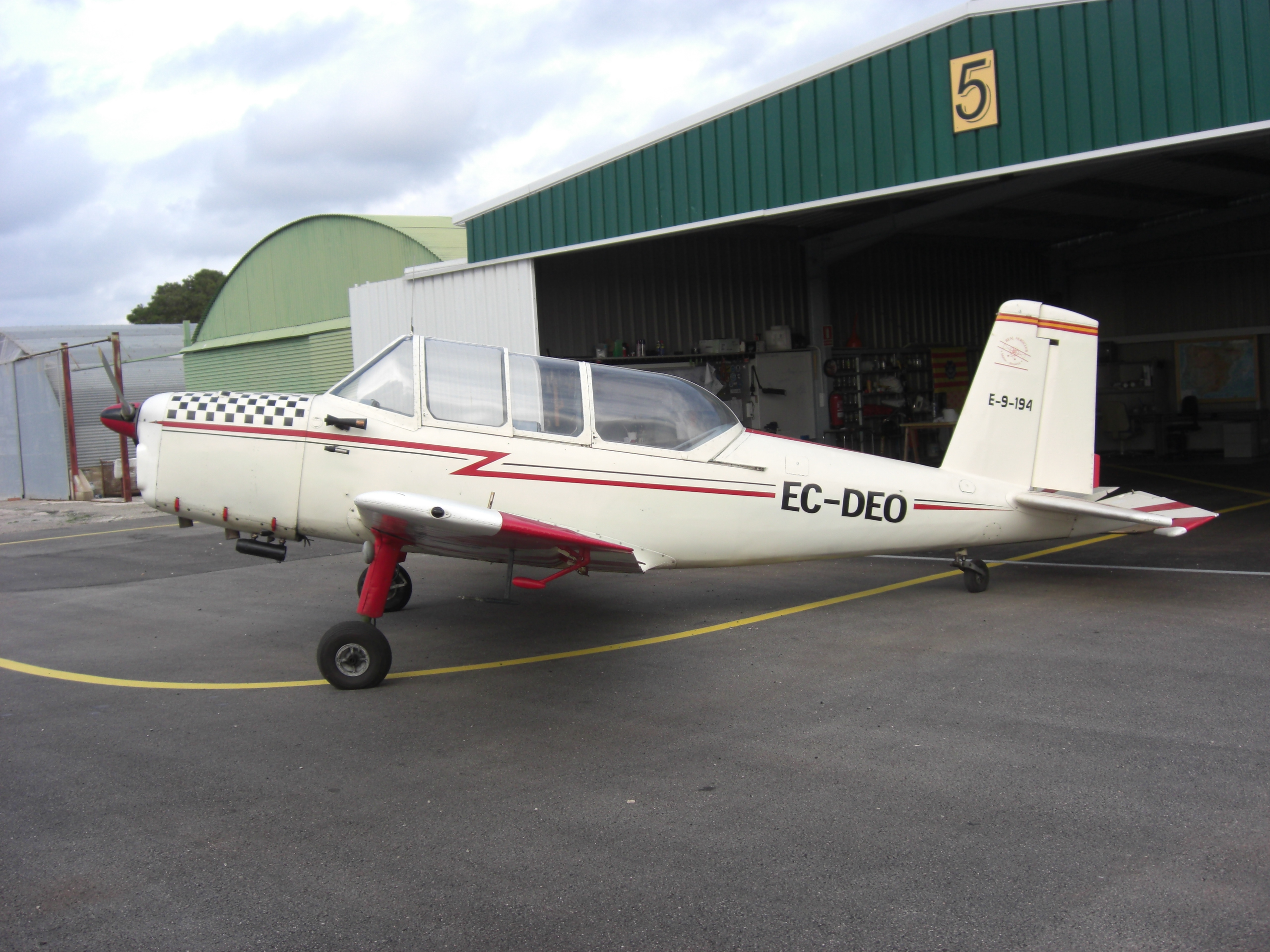

General information
- Type: Basic trainer
- National origin: Spain
- Manufacturer: AISA (Aeronáutica Industrial S.A.)
- Primary user: Spanish Air Force
- Number built: c.200

History
- Introduction date: 1956
- First flight: 20 June 1952
- Retired: 1976
- Developed from: AISA I-11

The AISA I-115 is a low-wing single-engined military primary trainer with tandem seating, which went into service with the Spanish Air Force in 1956. After retirement in 1976 many were sold to civil operators.

== Development ==
The AISA I-115 was a military development of the single-engined civil side-by-side seat I-11 which first flew in 1951. This aircraft was designed by Iberavia but built by Aeronáutica Industrial S.A. (AISA); later, Iberavia were taken over by AISA. The I-115 inherited the tail wheel undercarriage of the production version of the I-11, the I-11B, but was a longer machine because the Spanish Air Force wanted tandem seating for its trainers, had a slightly greater span and was considerably heavier. These changes called for more power, so the I-115 used a 112 kW (150 hp) ENMA Tigre inverted in-line engine.

Like the I-11 the I-115 had an all wood structure and most surfaces were plywood covered apart from fabric covered ailerons and flaps. The low, tapered, straight edged and square tipped wings had two spars and stressed plywood skin. Wing dihedral was 6°. The ailerons were differentially operated and drooped when the slotted flaps were lowered. The vertical stabiliser was almost rectangular and carried a balanced rudder. The horizontal tail surfaces were more tapered, the elevators balanced and carrying trim tabs. The fuselage was a wooden monocoque. The tandem cockpits were enclosed with a long, glazed cover with independent sliding sections for both instructor and pupil. Dual controls and instrumentation included provision for blind flying. The undercarriage was fixed and unfaired, each mainwheel carried on a single exposed leg. The mainwheels had brakes and the tailwheel was steerable.

The first prototype flew on 20 June 1952.

== Operational history ==
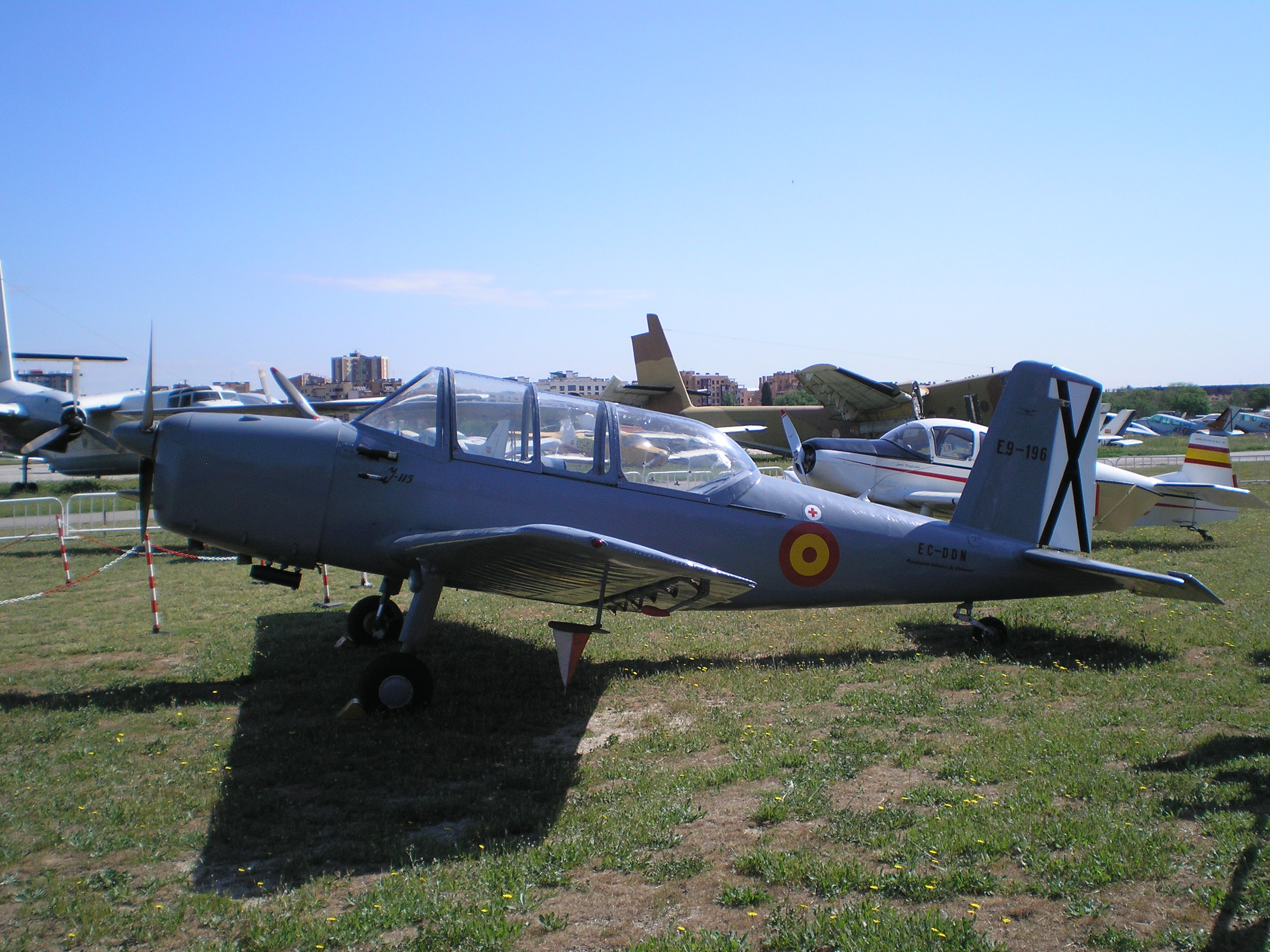
AISA I-115 EC-DDN painted in Spanish Air Force markings

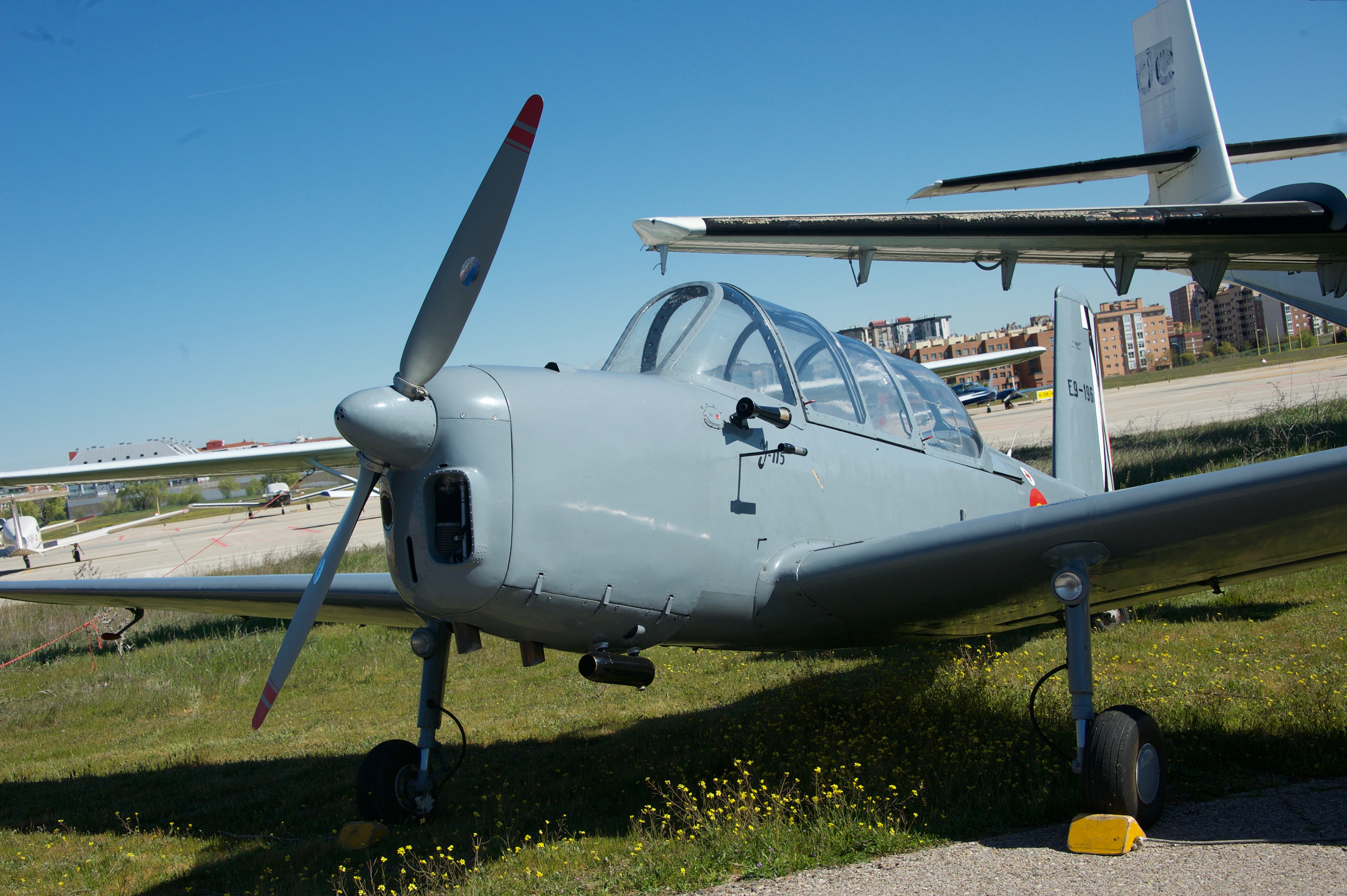
An AISA I-115 at Cuatro Vientos airport

About 200 I-115s were delivered to the Spanish airforce, 150 by the Spring of 1956; at that time there was an order for another 150. They were initially known as the type EE.6, EE being Escuela Elemental or Primary Training, but when this category was dropped the I-115 became the E.9 (E for - Entrenamiento or Trainer). The E.9 was in service from 1956 to 1976. Despite the long service, there was criticism of its spinning behaviour and its weight: apparently the unofficial nickname Garrapata or Tick was meant to describe the E.9's reluctance to leave its host, the ground. Most E.9s were powered by the Tigre engine but some late models had the 145 hp de Havilland Gipsy Major engine and others a 190 hp Lycoming O-435-A.

Many I-115s were sold to civilians at the end of their military service and in 2014 seven were still on the Spanish civil register. Three of these were in museums but were active until at least 2009.

== Specifications ==
Data from Jane's All the World's Aircraft 1956–57.

General characteristics

- Crew: 2
- Length: 7.35 m (24 ft 1 in)
- Wingspan: 9.54 m (31 ft 4 in)
- Height: 2.10 m (6 ft 11 in)
- Wing area: 14.0 m^{2} (151 sq ft)
- Airfoil: NACA 23015/23009
- Empty weight: 612 kg (1,349 lb)
- Gross weight: 900 kg (1,984 lb)
- Fuel capacity: 135 L (30 imp gal; 36 US gal)
- Powerplant: 1 × ENMA Tigre G-IV-B four-cylinder inverted air-cooled, 110 kW (150 hp)

Performance

- Maximum speed: 240 km/h (150 mph, 130 kn)
- Cruise speed: 204 km/h (127 mph, 110 kn)
- Endurance: 3.5 hr (at 70% power)
- Service ceiling: 4,400 m (14,400 ft)
- Rate of climb: 3.48 m/s (686 ft/min)
- Takeoff distance to 15 m (50 ft): 380 m (1,247 ft)
- Landing distance from 15 m (50 ft): 350 m (1,148 ft)
