= Loring R-III =

R-III
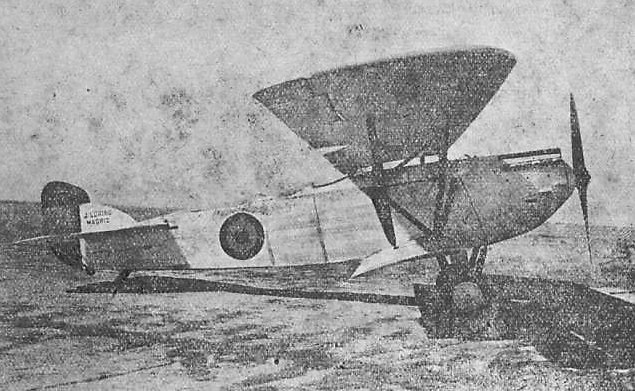

General information
- Type: Reconnaissance and light attack aircraft
- National origin: Spain
- Manufacturer: Talleres Loring
- Designer: Eduardo Barron
- Primary user: Aeronáutica Militar
- Number built: 110

History
- First flight: 1926

The Loring R-III or R-3 was a 1920s Spanish two-seat sesquiplane reconnaissance and light attack aircraft designed by engineer Eduardo Barrón and built by Dr. Jorge Loring's company, Talleres Loring.

== Operational history ==
In the mid 1920s, during General Primo de Rivera's dictatorship the R-III entered a contest along with the Potez 25 for the modernization of the Spanish Military Air Arm. Both planes had similar characteristics, but the Military Directory favoured the Loring R-III in order to promote local industries. The Aeronáutica Militar placed an order of 110 units, which put the Loring company at the head of the Spanish aeronautical industry of the time.

In October and November 1926 three variants of the R-3 were exhibited at the Loring section of the National Aeronautics Exhibition held in Madrid's Palacio de Cristal: The R-3, the C-1 fighter and the T-1 light trainer. Neither the fighter nor the trainer variants, however, went into production.

Some R-3s remained in service well after the proclamation of the Spanish Republic until the outbreak of the Spanish Civil War. It is not clear, however, whether they saw active service in the civil war.

== Variants ==
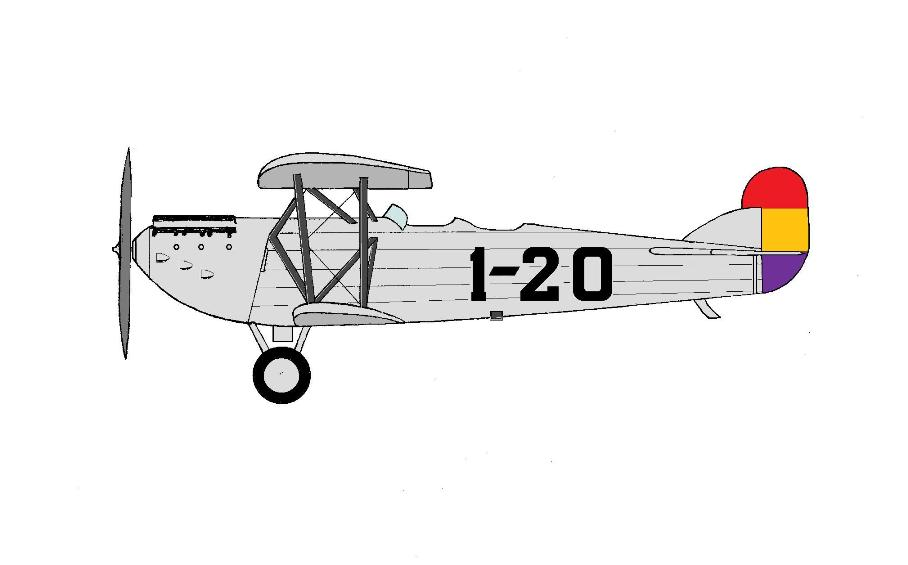
Loring R-III Aeronautica Militar

R-3
The main version with two tandem open cockpits; powered by a 600 kW (800 hp) Hispano-Suiza 12Hb engine.

C-1
Fighter prototype based on the R-3; one built and exhibited at the Palacio de Cristal Aeronautical exhibition in 1926.

T-1
Light trainer based on the R-3; one prototype built in 1926.

== Operators ==
Spain (Kingdom)

- Aeronáutica Militar

Spain (Republic)

- Aeronáutica Militar

== Specifications ==
Data from Ejército del Aire website, Jane's all the World's Aircraft 1931

General characteristics

- Crew: 2
- Length: 9.7 m (31 ft 10 in)
- Wingspan: 14.5 m (47 ft 7 in)
- Height: 2.6 m (8 ft 6 in)
- Wing area: 46.5 m^{2} (501 sq ft)
- Empty weight: 1,460 kg (3,219 lb)
- Gross weight: 2,380 kg (5,247 lb)
- Powerplant: 1 × Hispano-Suiza 12Hb V-12 water-cooled piston engine, 450 kW (600 hp)
- Propellers: 2-bladed fixed-pitch propeller

Performance

- Maximum speed: 235 km/h (146 mph, 127 kn)
- Stall speed: 82 km/h (51 mph, 44 kn)
- Service ceiling: 8,000 m (26,000 ft)
- Time to altitude:

1,000 m (3,300 ft) in 3 minutes
5,000 m (16,000 ft) in 22 minutes

- Wing loading: 51 kg/m^{2} (10 lb/sq ft)
- Power/mass: 0.1912 kW/kg (0.1163 hp/lb)

Armament

- Guns:

2 × fixed, forward-firing 7.7 mm (0.303 in) machine guns in the engine cowling.
2 × trainable 7.7 mm (0.303 in) machine guns on a Scarff ring for the observer.

- Bombs: 40x 11 kg (24 lb) or 8x 50 kg (110 lb) bombs

== See also ==
Related development

- Loring R-I

Aircraft of comparable role, configuration, and era

- AME VI

Related lists

- List of Interwar military aircraft
- List of aircraft of the Spanish Republican Air Force
