= Walter Jr. =

Walter Jr. may refer to

== People ==
- Walter Bishop Jr. (1927–1998), an American jazz pianist
- Walter P. Chrysler Jr. (1909–1988), an American art collector and museum benefactor
- Walter Cronkite (full name Walter Leland Cronkite Jr., 1916–2009), an American broadcast journalist
- Walt Frazier (full name Walter Frazier Jr., born 1945), an American former basketball player
- Walter A. Haas Jr. (1916–1995), chairman of Levi Strauss & Co from 1970 to 1981
- Walt Lemon Jr. (born 1992), an American professional basketball player
- Walter M. Miller Jr. (1923–1996), an American science fiction writer
- Wally Schirra (full name Walter Marty Schirra Jr., 1923–2007), an American naval aviator, test pilot, and NASA astronaut
- Walter Scott Jr. (1931–2021), an American civil engineer
- Walter White Jr., fictional character debuted in 2008 in Breaking Bad

== Other ==
- Walter Junior, a 1930s Czech aero-engine also built under license as the P.Z. Inż. Junior
