= Jorge Loring Martinez =

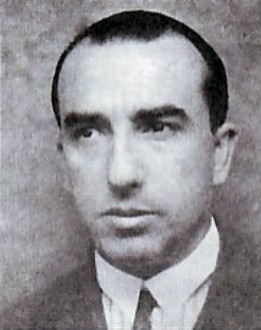
- Born: October 12, 1889; Málaga, Spain
- Died: September 22, 1936 (aged 46); Madrid, Spain
- Occupations: Inventor, Entrepreneur, Engineer
- Children: Jorge Loring Miró SJ
- Parent(s): Manuel Loring, Ana Martinez

Jorge Loring Martinez (Málaga, Spain, October 12, 1889 – Madrid, Spain, September 22, 1936) was a Spanish engineer and entrepreneur, pioneer of civil aviation in that country, and considered by the Spanish Patent Office one of their great inventors. Grandson of businessman and politician Jorge Loring y Oyarzábal, he was born into a wealthy family which from the beginning of the century was dedicated to banking, mining, steel and railways.

== Education and early career ==
In 1912 he graduated in Madrid as a civil engineer. In 1916 he joined the administration and was assigned to the Head of Public Works, Ciudad Real, but soon asked for leave to pursue his true calling: aviation. That same year he received the degree of airplane pilot in the National School of Aeronautics, established in Madrid, and acquired an aircraft (type Blériot) made in Spain that tore shortly after landing. In 1917 he became a coach at Casa Pujol, Comabella y Cia. In Barcelona, he was owner of an airline pilot school in El Prat de Llobregat and some workshops for building cars and planes.

== Partnership ==
In 1919, he with a mechanical genius and Argentinian inventor Raúl Pateras Pescara, formed a partnership to operate Helicopteracion Pateras Pescara. They received a delegation from France of the French Aerospace Technical Services in 1921.

== Air Service ==
In 1920, he obtained the concession air postal service between Seville and Larache (Morocco), and after leaving Casa Pujol created in 1921 the Spanish Air Traffic Company (CETA), the first Spanish passenger civil airline. Jorge Loring exploited the concession of the line until it was integrated with other airlines to form a joint monopoly called CLASSA (Concesionaria de Líneas Aéreas Subvencionadas), which was replaced by LAPE (Líneas Aéreas Postales Españolas) in April 1932.

In 1922, he established a private school for pilots in Carabanchel (Madrid) and was named manager of a blimp for travel between Seville and Buenos Aires.

== Aircraft manufacturer ==
The following year, Jorge Loring Martinez created the company Talleres Loring (Loring Workshops), located in Cuatro Vientos, (Madrid), which began manufacturing military aircraft beginning with Fokker C.IV planes. Later Talleres Loring would build some of Juan de la Cierva's autogyro prototypes, such as the Cierva C.7 and Cierva C.12, as well as the Loring R-1, the Loring R-2 and the Loring R-3 airplanes. Overwhelmed by the large financial cost of its projects, in 1931 Jorge Loring rejoined the government service. Three years later he was bailed out by his brother and founded Aeronáutica Industrial S.A. (AISA) to manufacture airplanes and aircraft for military use.

== War and death ==
Holding a monarchist and conservative ideology, at the outbreak of the Spanish Civil War he initially sought the protection of the British Embassy. However, he kept his business going, attending daily to their offices in Carabanchel, the place where he would be shot in November 1936.

== Aviation patents ==
Jorge Loring registered aviation-oriented patents on seven occasions, (pat. No. 56 912), in 1913, and (pat. No. 85 802), in 1923. Other patents (between 1918 and 1919) made reference to engines and propellers (pats. No. 68,049, No. 70,669, No. 70,908, No. 71,433, No. 71,484).
