= AME VI =

Type of reconnaissance plane built in Spain in 1924

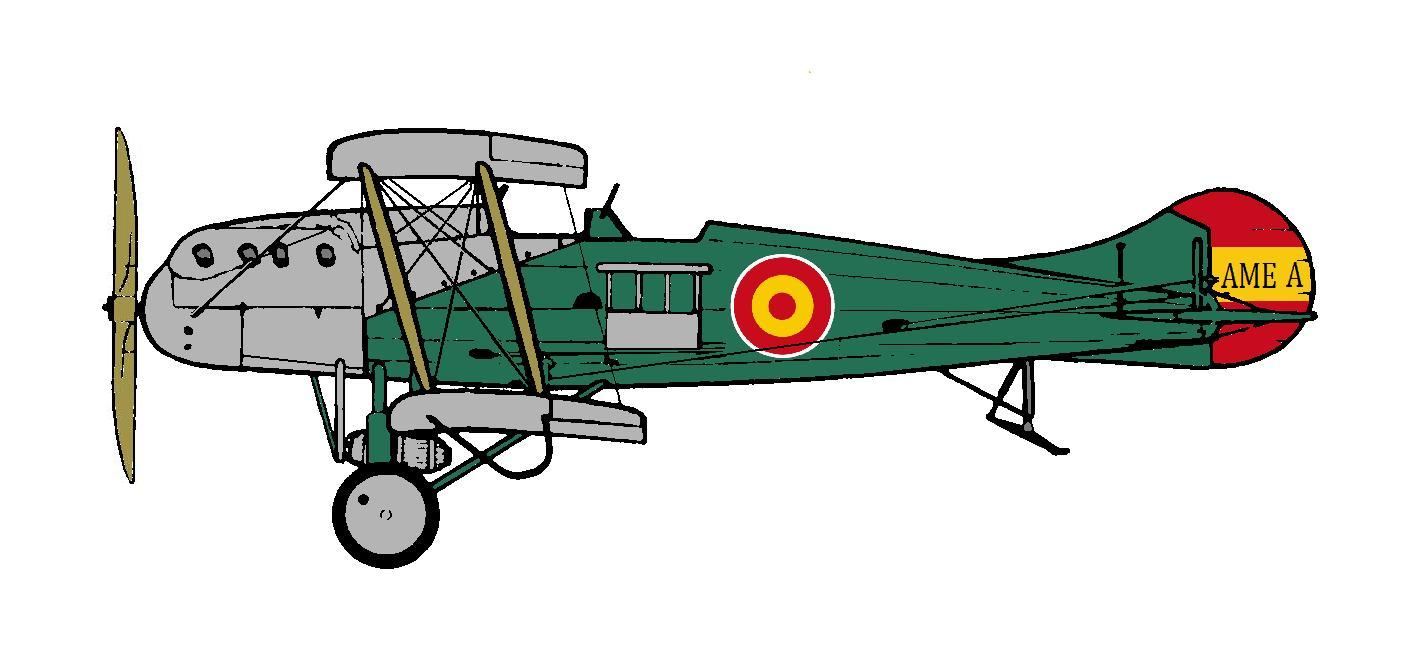

General information
- Type: Reconnaissance aircraft
- National origin: Spain
- Manufacturer: Aeronáutica Militar Española
- Designer: Manuel Bada Vasallo and Arturo González Gil
- Primary user: Aeronáutica Militar
- Number built: 20

History
- Introduction date: 1925
- First flight: 1924

The AME VI was a reconnaissance aircraft, produced in Spain in the mid 1920s.

== Design and development ==
It was designed by pilot and engineer Captain Manuel Bada Vasallo assisted by Arturo González Gil based on the Bristol F.2b aircraft used at the time by the Spanish Military Air Arm (Aeronáutica Militar Española), hence its designation AME.

The two first prototypes were built in 1924 at the Aeronáutica Militar workshop in Cuatro Vientos. Conventional for its day, it was a biplane with staggered wings powered by a Hispano-Suiza 8Fb 220 kW (300 hp) engine. The twin-leg Lamblin radiators were mounted on the undercarriage. The pilot and observer sat in open cockpits in tandem.

Twenty examples were produced for the Aeronáutica Militar of the Spanish Army in 1925 and 1926, being incorporated in the Grupo IV unit at Melilla, along with the existing Bristol F-2b. In February 1927 the AME VI were made part of the Escuela de Observadores training unit at Cuatro Vientos. They remained in service until December 1931 when they were phased out during the military restructuring promoted by Manuel Azaña, the newly nominated Minister of War of the republican government. Azaña's aim was to modernize the Spanish military and cut down the expenses of the state in the aftermath of the Great Depression.

The AME VI was further developed with redesigned fuselage and tail unit as the AME VIA

== Operators ==
Spain (Kingdom)

- Aeronáutica Militar

Spain (Republic)

- Aeronáutica Militar

== Specifications ==
Data from Encyclopedia of Spanish Military Aircraft

General characteristics

- Crew: 2
- Length: 7.8 m (25 ft 7 in)
- Wingspan: 11.9 m (39 ft 1 in)
- Height: 3.6 m (11 ft 10 in)
- Empty weight: 870 kg (1,918 lb)
- Gross weight: 1,250 kg (2,756 lb)
- Powerplant: 1 × Hispano-Suiza 8Fb V-8 water-cooled piston engine, 220 kW (300 hp)

Performance

- Maximum speed: 190 km/h (120 mph, 100 kn)
- Range: 500 km (310 mi, 270 nmi)
- Service ceiling: 6,100 m (20,000 ft)

Armament

- Guns: 1 × fixed backward firing machine gun in rear cockpit
- Bombs: Light bombs

== See also ==
Related development

- Bristol F.2 Fighter

Aircraft of comparable role, configuration, and era

- Loring R-1

Related lists

- List of Interwar military aircraft
