= AISA I-11 =

I-11
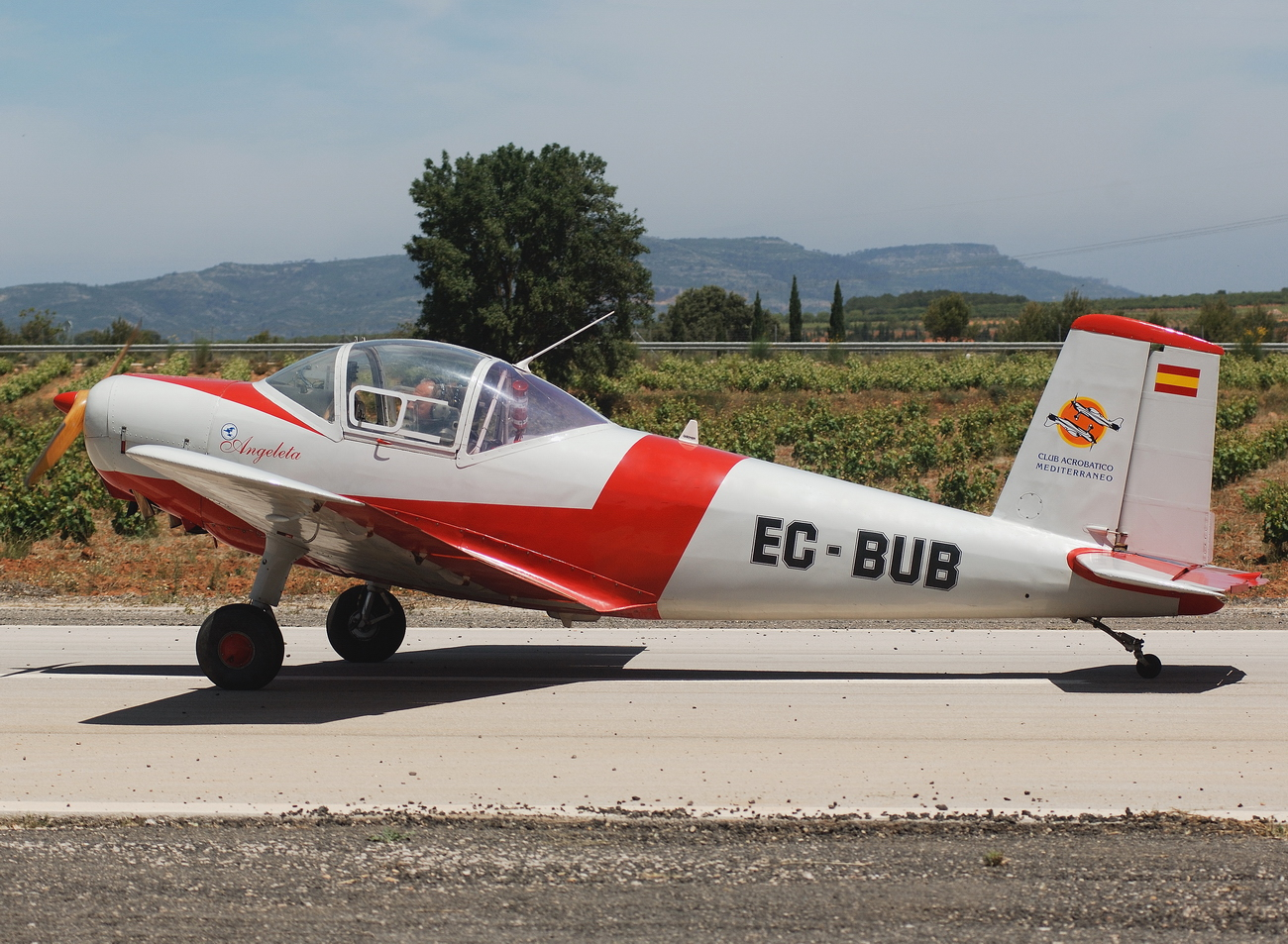

General information
- Type: Two-seat general aviation aircraft
- Manufacturer: Iberavia/AISA
- Number built: 208

History
- First flight: 16 July 1951
- Variants: AISA I-115

The I-11 was a two-seat civil utility aircraft manufactured in Spain in the 1950s. Originally designed by the Spanish aircraft company Iberavia, its first (of two) prototype flew on 16 July 1951. It was a low-wing monoplane of conventional configuration with fixed, tricycle undercarriage and a large, bubble canopy over the two side-by-side seats. Flight characteristics were found to be pleasing, but before plans could be made for mass production, Iberavia was acquired by AISA.

The new management decided to continue with development, but made a few changes to the design, reducing the size of the canopy, and replacing the undercarriage with a taildragger arrangement. This configuration entered production in 1952 with an order from the Director General for Civil Aviation for 70 aircraft for use in Spain's aeroclubs. The Spanish Air Force then ordered 125 for use in training and liaison roles.

The Air Force then requested 200 aircraft built with the seats in tandem, which were designated I-115 by the manufacturers powered by a 112 kW (150 hp) ENMA Tigre inverted air-cooled engine.

== Variants ==
I-11
2 prototypes by Iberavia, tricycle undercarriage
I-11B
Production examples by AISA
AISA I-115
Tandem-seat version.

== Operators ==
Spain

- Spanish Air Force

== Specifications (I-11B) ==
Data from Jane's All The World's Aircraft 1969–70

General characteristics

- Crew: 1
- Capacity: 1 passenger or trainee
- Length: 6.48 m (21 ft 3 in)
- Wingspan: 9.32 m (30 ft 7 in)
- Height: 1.91 m (6 ft 3 in)
- Wing area: 13.4 m^{2} (144 sq ft)
- Empty weight: 420 kg (926 lb)
- Gross weight: 669 kg (1,474 lb)
- Powerplant: 1 × Continental C90-12F Four-cylinder air-cooled horiztonally opposed piston engine, 67 kW (90 hp)

Performance

- Maximum speed: 201 km/h (125 mph, 109 kn)
- Cruise speed: 180 km/h (110 mph, 96 kn)
- Range: 640 km (400 mi, 350 nmi)
- Service ceiling: 4,700 m (15,400 ft)
- Rate of climb: 3.69 m/s (726 ft/min)
