= Adaro (company) =

Spanish aircraft manufacturer

- Industry: Aircraft manufacturing
- Founder: Julio Adaro
- Headquarters: Spain

Adaro was a Spanish aircraft manufacturer founded by engineer Julio Adaro to manufacture training aircraft for the Spanish Air Force prior to the Civil War.

== List of Aircraft ==
- Adaro Chirta (1935) single-engine two-seat biplane training aircraft
