= Cierva C.7 =

C.7
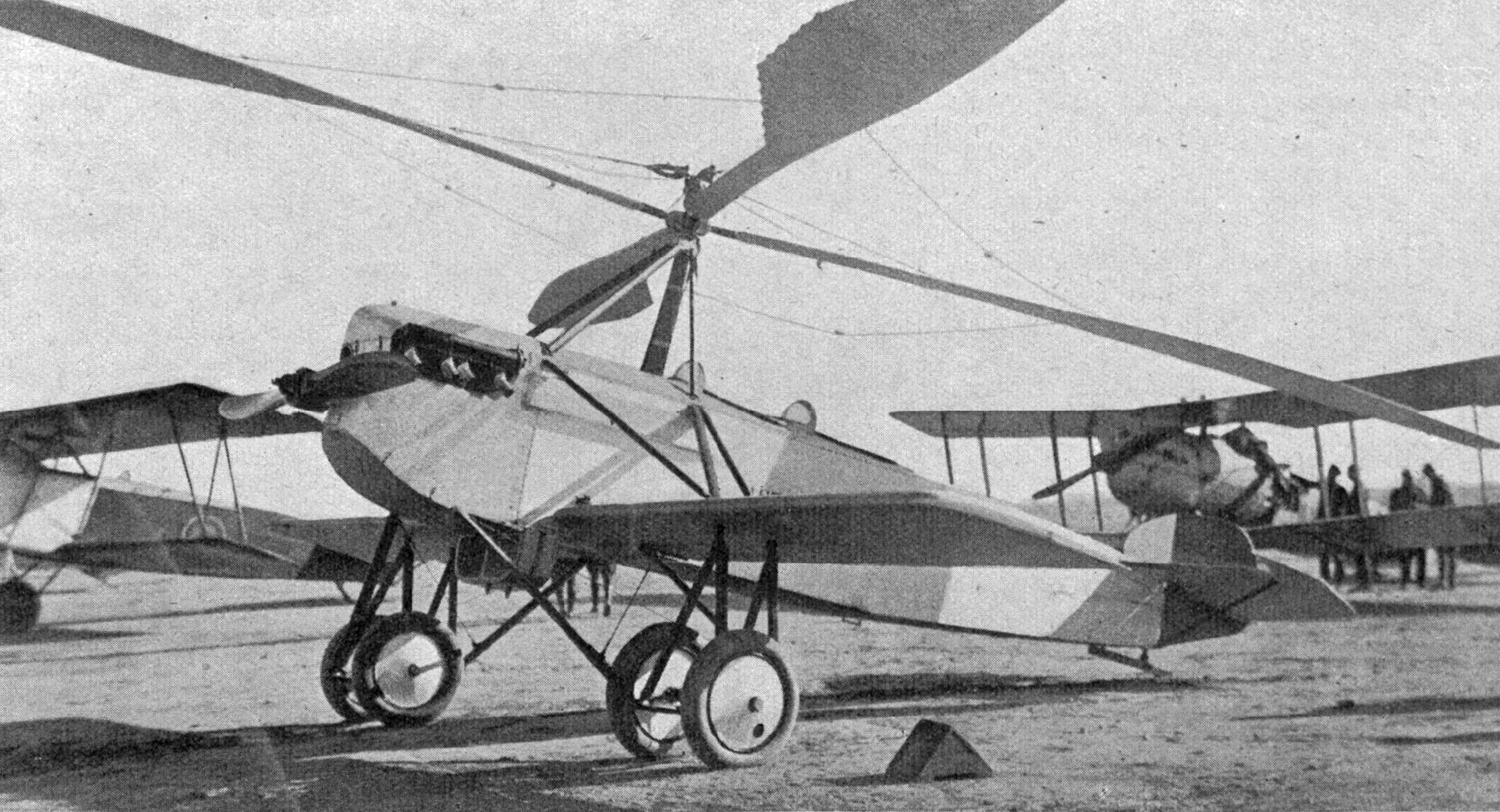
- Cierva C.7 at L'Aeronatique in January 1927

General information
- Type: Experimental autogyro
- Manufacturer: Loring Workshops
- Designer: Juan de la Cierva
- Primary user: Spanish Air Ministry

History
- First flight: November 15, 1926

The Cierva C.7 was an experimental autogiro designed by Juan de la Cierva and built in the late 1920s.

== Development history ==
On January 7, 1927, the Cierva C.6C was flying at 30 m (98 ft), when one of its blades detached from the hub. The autogyro began to descend vertically at almost normal speed for autorotation. At 6 m (20 ft) from the ground, a second rotor blade came off. The pilot Courtney was fortunately only slightly bruised. The reaction of the British Air Ministry to this accident, was the suspension of all autogyro flights in Great Britain until a solution was found to the detachment of the blades in flight.

Juan de la Cierva designed a new rotor with a second linkage on the hub to correct the overstrain to eliminate cyclic stresses. To the existing one of abatement that eliminated the problem of lift asymmetry, a second one was added, which was designated as a drag joint, which allowed the blade to oscillate in the plane of rotation. He could not carry out the tests with this new configuration with the prohibition against flight still in place, so de la Cierva moved to Madrid to work on the C.7; there it was fitted with a new double-jointed rotor head. After carrying tests, including flights with Juan de la Cierva as a passenger, it was concluded that the appropriate solution had been reached. In addition it gave a much smoother flight.

== Variants ==
C.7
Two-seater gyroplane with a 300 hp Hispano Suiza engine.
C.VII
Denomination given by the Loring company.

== Specifications (C.6) ==
Data from

General characteristics

- Crew: one
- Length: 29 ft 6 in (9 m)
- Max takeoff weight: 1,984 lb (900 kg)
- Powerplant: 1 × Hispano-Suiza 8F 9-cyl. air-cooled rotary piston engine, 300 hp (220 kW)
- Main rotor diameter: 32 ft 10 in (10 m)
- Main rotor area: 845.5 sq ft (78.55 m^{2})
- Propellers: 2-bladed fixed-pitch wooden propeller

Performance

- Maximum speed: 62 mph (100 km/h, 54 kn)

== See also ==
Related lists

- List of experimental aircraft
