= Talleres Loring =

Spanish aeronautical company

- Industry: Aeronautics, defence
- Predecessor: Loring Pujol y Cia
- Founded: 1923
- Founder: Jorge Loring Martinez
- Defunct: 1934
- Fate: Bankruptcy
- Successor: Aeronáutica Industrial S.A.
- Headquarters: Spain
- Products: Aircraft

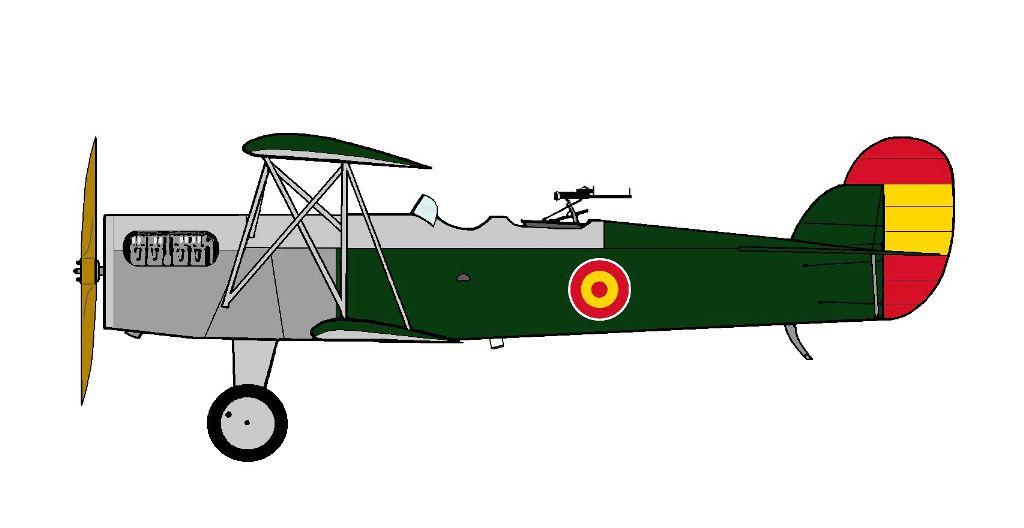
Loring R-1 of the Aeronáutica Militar ca. 1927

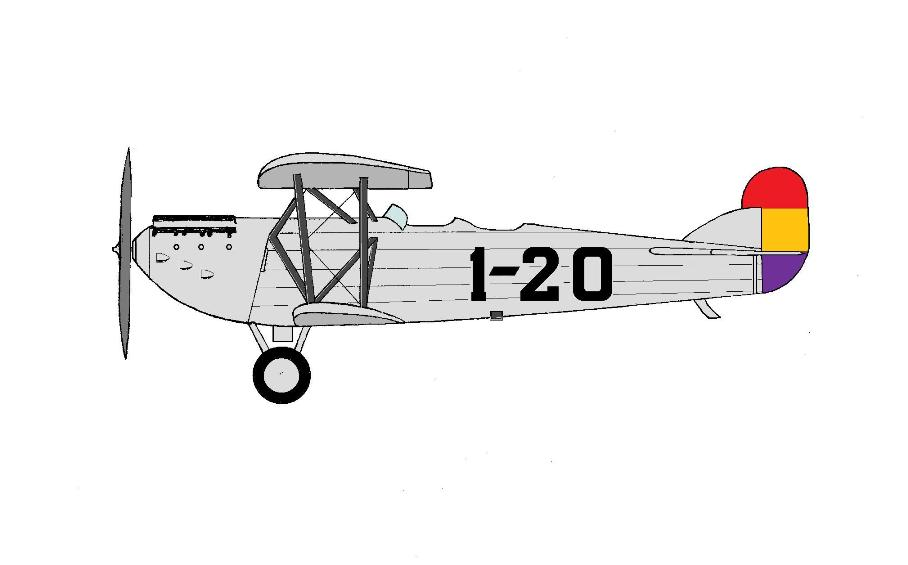
The Loring R-3, last model built for Aeronáutica Militar.

Talleres Loring (Loring Workshops) was a Spanish aeronautical company founded by engineer and entrepreneur Jorge Loring after moving to Madrid.

== History ==
A predecessor company, Loring Pujol y Cia, had been founded in Barcelona by Jorge Loring together with Claudio Baradat Guillé in 1918.

The new company established its factory in Cuatro Vientos, Carabanchel, in SW Madrid in 1923 and began production in 1924. It soon received orders to manufacture military aircraft, beginning with Fokker C.IV planes. Later Talleres Loring would build some of Juan de la Cierva's autogyro prototypes, such as the Cierva C.7 and Cierva C.12.

Talleres Loring also would produce its own aircraft, mostly designed by engineer Eduardo Barrón, such as the Loring R-1, the Loring R-2 and the Loring R-3 airplanes. Overwhelmed by the large financial cost of its projects, in 1931 Jorge Loring rejoined the government service. Three years later, in 1934, the Talleres Loring company filed for bankruptcy. Jorge Loring was bailed out by his brother and founded Aeronáutica Industrial S.A. (AISA), which also manufactured aircraft for military use, and where he was found dead on 22 September 1936, at the beginning of the Spanish Civil War.

The Loring RB surveillance aircraft, a monoplane prototype said to have been built right at the beginning in 1923, and the T-2 are developments about which there are almost no data.

== List of Aircraft ==
- C-1, fighter prototype based on the R-3; one built and exhibited at the Palacio de Cristal Aeronautical exhibition in 1926.
- E-1, two-seat light monoplane prototype with an extra fin and rudder placed over the fuselage; first flown in 1929.
- E-2, parasol wing light monoplane; at least 4 built in 1930.
- R-1, two-seat sesquiplane for surveillance and light bombing, 30 built in 1925.
- R-2, a development of the R-I that did not go into production.
- R-3, a reconnaissance and light attack aircraft; four prototypes built in 1926; went into production in 1927 with a total of 110 units built.
- T-1, light trainer aircraft based on the R-3; one prototype built in 1926.
- T-2, also known as B-1, commercial biplane prototype for 5 passengers; built in 1929 or 1930
- T-3, three-engined commercial monoplane, also known as Barrón Colonial; a "colonial aircraft" built in 1931, first flight in 1932.
- B-2, ambitious project of a six-engined bomber with a 4.000 kg payload that remained on paper.
- Loring X, a two-seat low-wing monoplane with closed cockpit; built in 1934.

Under licence

- Cierva C.12
- Fokker C.IV
