= Beneš-Mráz Be-150 Beta-Junior =

Be-150 Beta Junior
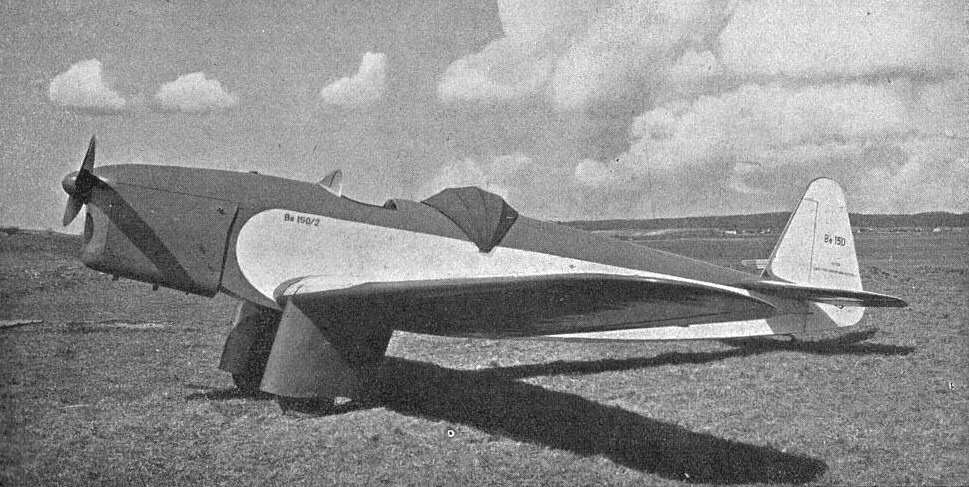

General information
- Type: Light aerobatic trainer and racing aircraft
- National origin: Czechoslovakia
- Manufacturer: Beneš-Mráz (Pavel Beneš and Jaroslav Mráz)
- Designer: Ing. Pavel Beneš
- Number built: 3

History
- First flight: 5 January 1937
- Developed from: Beneš-Mráz Be-50 Beta-Minor

The Beneš-Mráz Be-150 Beta-Junior was a light aerobatic trainer and racing aircraft, designed and built in Czechoslovakia in the late 1930s.

== Design and development ==
With the success of the Beneš-Mráz Be-50 Beta-Minor Beneš decided to produce a smaller version with better performance for sport flying. A major incentive was the availability of five spare 78 kW (105 hp) Walter Junior engines, which would imbue the Be-150 with much improved vertical performance compared to the Be-50.

Beneš shortened the fuselage and fitted the short-span wings of the Be-52, retaining the open cockpits and fixed, trousered, tailwheel undercarriage of the Be-50.

== Operational history ==
The Be-150 was first flown on 5 January 1937, but was rejected by the MNO (Czechoslovak Ministry of Defense) and the three production aircraft were used for general flying club use and for air racing.

== Specifications (Be-150) ==
Data from

General characteristics

- Crew: 2
- Length: 7.55 m (24 ft 9 in)
- Wingspan: 10.66 m (35 ft 0 in)
- Wing area: 14 m^{2} (150 sq ft)
- Gross weight: 790 kg (1,742 lb)
- Powerplant: 1 × Walter Junior 4-cyl. Air-cooled inverted in-line piston engine, 78 kW (105 hp)

Performance

- Maximum speed: 215 km/h (134 mph, 116 kn)
- Cruise speed: 185 km/h (115 mph, 100 kn)
- Range: 750 km (470 mi, 400 nmi)
- Service ceiling: 5,500 m (18,000 ft)
