= Loring R-1 =

Type of aircraft

R-I
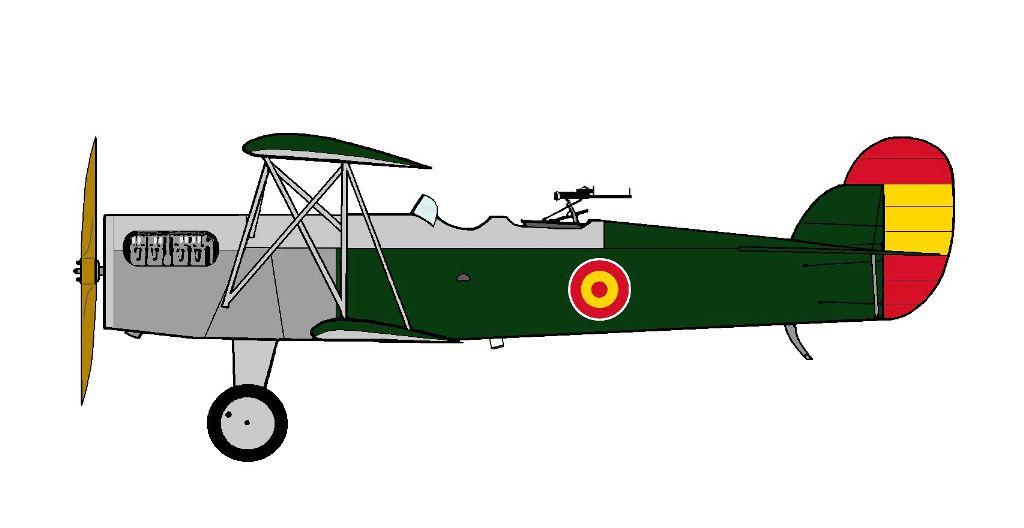

General information
- Type: Reconnaissance and light attack aircraft
- National origin: Spain
- Manufacturer: Loring
- Designer: Eduardo Barron
- Primary user: Aeronáutica Militar
- Number built: 30

The Loring R-1 or R-I was a reconnaissance aircraft and light bomber produced in Spain in the late 1920s. It was the first design by Eduardo Barron for Jorge Loring's company — Talleres Loring, and the firm's first aircraft of its own design.

== Design and development ==
Conventional for its day, it was a biplane with staggered wings that were braced with struts in a Warren truss-like configuration. The pilot and observer sat in open cockpits in tandem and the main units of the fixed, tailskid undercarriage were divided.

The design of the Loring R-I was inspired by the Fokker C.V, and saw service in Morocco during the last stages of the Rif War from July 1926 until March 1927.

Thirty examples were produced for the Aeronáutica Militar of the Spanish Army. They remained in service until December 1931 when they were phased out during the military restructuring promoted by Manuel Azaña, the newly nominated Minister of War of the republican government. Azaña's aim was to modernize the Spanish Military and cut down the expenses of the state in the aftermath of the Great Depression.

== Variants ==
R-1
First prototype aircraft that later went into production.
R-2 (R-II)
A refined version able to take heavier load than the R-I that was designed around 1925 before production shifted to the Loring R-3.

== Operators ==
Spain (Kingdom)

- Aeronáutica Militar

Spain (Republic)

- Aeronáutica Militar

== Specifications ==
Data from

General characteristics

- Crew: 2
- Length: 9.7 m (31 ft 10 in)
- Wingspan: 14 m (45 ft 11 in)
- Empty weight: 1,850 kg (4,079 lb)
- Gross weight: 2,120 kg (4,674 lb)
- Powerplant: 1 × Lorraine Dietrich 12 Eb , 340 kW (450 hp)

Performance

- Maximum speed: 216 km/h (134 mph, 117 kn)
- Range: 800 km (500 mi, 430 nmi)
- Service ceiling: 7,000 m (23,000 ft)

Armament

- 1 × fixed backward firing machine gun in rear cockpit
- Light bombs

== See also ==
Related development

- Loring R-III

Aircraft of comparable role, configuration, and era

- AME VI
- Fokker C.IV

Related lists

- List of Interwar military aircraft
