= AISA GN =

Spanish prototype autogyro

GN

General information
- Type: Autogyro
- Manufacturer: AISA
- Number built: 1

History
- First flight: 1982

The AISA GN was a prototype four-seat autogyro developed in Spain between 1971 and 1982. it featured an extensively-glazed cabin fitted with a pusher engine and tricycle undercarriage. A separate tail fin was carried at the end of two booms mounted to stub wings. The prototype was developed with a 200 hp engine. The aircraft suffered from an extremely prolonged development, but finally took to the air on 20 July 1982. In September that year, however, it was damaged in an accident, and development was finally abandoned.

== Specifications (performance estimated) ==
Data from Jane's All the World's Aircraft 1982–83

General characteristics

- Crew: 1
- Capacity: 3 passengers
- Length: 6.50 m (21 ft 4 in)
- Height: 3.20 m (10 ft 6 in)
- Empty weight: 978 kg (2,156 lb)
- Max takeoff weight: 1,400 kg (3,086 lb)
- Fuel capacity: 151 L (40 US gal; 33 imp gal)
- Powerplant: 1 × Lycoming IO-540-K1A5 air-cooled flat-six engine, 220 kW (300 hp)
- Main rotor diameter: 12.00 m (39 ft 4 in)
- Main rotor area: 108.62 m^{2} (1,169.2 sq ft)

Performance

- Maximum speed: 240 km/h (150 mph, 130 kn) at sea level
- Cruise speed: 212 km/h (132 mph, 114 kn)
- Range: 800 km (500 mi, 430 nmi)
- Endurance: 6 hr (pilot and 2 passengers)
- g limits: +3.5/-1.0
- Rate of climb: 60 m/s (12,000 ft/min)
