= Walter Junior =

1930s Czech piston aircraft engine

Junior
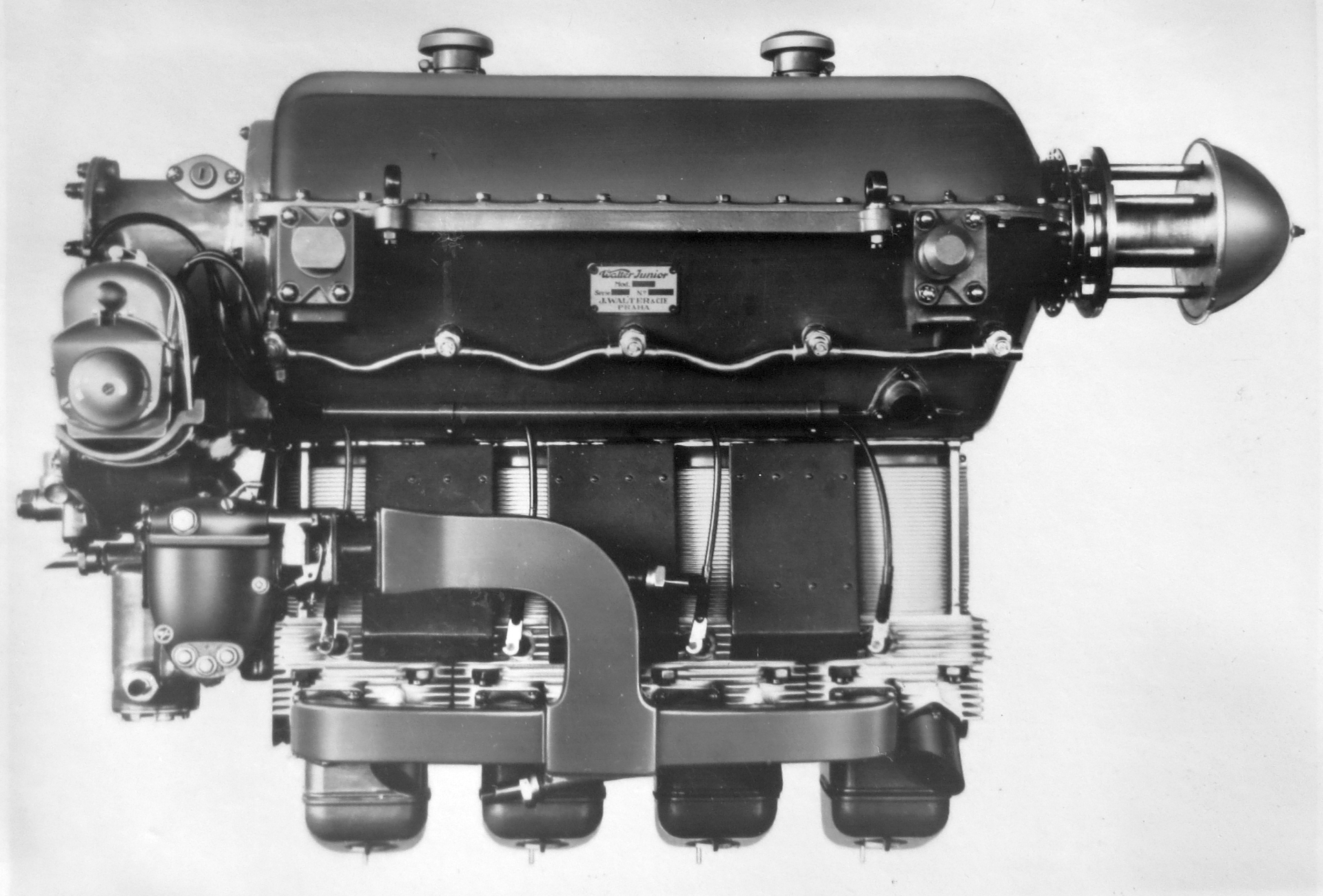
- Type: Inline piston engine
- National origin: Czechoslovakia
- Manufacturer: Walter Aircraft Engines
- First run: 1932

The Walter Junior was a family of four cylinder air cooled inverted inline engines produced by Walter Aircraft Engines in Czechoslovakia in the 1930s for aircraft, characterised by a bore and stroke of 115 mm × 140 mm (4.53 in × 5.51 in), a displacement of 5,814 cm^{3} (354.8 cu in) and producing roughly 78 kW (105 hp).

The Junior was also built in Poland as the P.Z. Inż. Junior.

== Variants ==
Walter Junior 4-I
78 kW (105 hp) at 2,000 rpm.

Walter Junior-Major
89 kW (120 hp) at 2,100 rpm (nominal), 97 kW (130 hp) at 2,350 rpm (maximum).

P.Z. Inż. Junior
Approximately 600 engines manufactured under license in Poland by Państwowe Zakłady Inżynierii, Warsaw.

Elizalde J4
Approximately 150 engines manufactured under license in Spain by Elizalde SA Barcelona.

== Applications ==
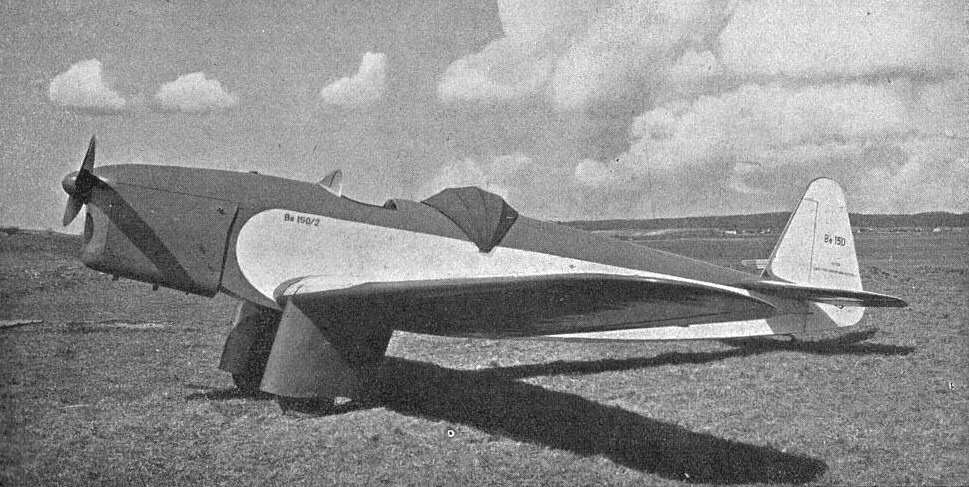
Beneš-Mráz Be-150 Beta-Junior

- Adaro Chirta
- Aero A.34
- Beneš-Mráz Be-150 Beta-Junior
- Breda Ba.15
- de Havilland Puss Moth
- González Gil-Pazó GP-1
- Hispano-Suiza E-34
- Hopfner HS-10/32
- Praga BH-111
- RWD 5
- RWD 8
- RWD 10

== Specifications ==
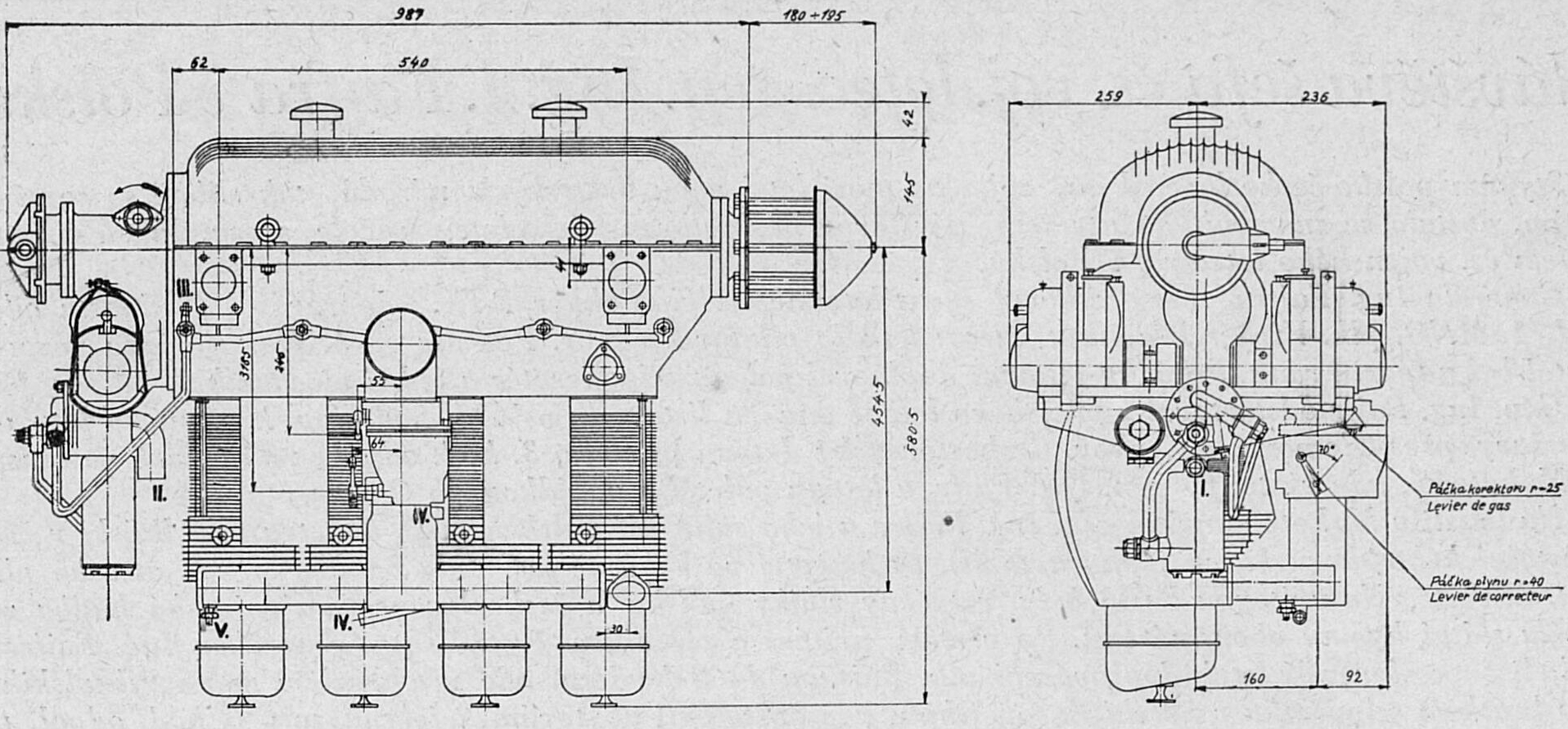

=== General characteristics ===
- Type: 4-cylinder inverted air-cooled inline
- Bore: 115 mm (4.5 in)
- Stroke: 140 mm (5.5 in)
- Displacement: 5.816 L (354.9 cu in)
- Length: 1,182 mm (46.5 in)
- Width: 526 mm (20.7 in)
- Height: 767 mm (30.2 in)
- Dry weight: 135 kg (298 lb) dry

=== Components ===
- Valvetrain: One intake and one exhaust valve per cylinder operated by pushrods and rockers
- Fuel system: Zenith or Claudel-Hobson carburettor
- Fuel type: 68 octane petrol
- Oil system: Pressure fed, dry sump
- Cooling system: Air-cooled
- Reduction gear: Direct drive, left hand tractor

=== Performance ===
- Power output: 78 kW (105 hp) at 2,000 rpm (nominal), 89 kW (120 hp) at 2,200 rpm (maximum)
- Compression ratio: 5.2:1

== See also ==
Comparable engines

- Menasco Pirate

Related lists

- List of aircraft engines
