= Iberavia =

Spanish airplane development company

Iberavia was a Spanish aircraft manufacturing company established in Madrid in 1946. Originally, the firm built aircraft instruments, but from 1948 onwards supplied training gliders of its own design to the Spanish Air Force (the IP-2). In 1951 it flew a prototype light plane, the Iberavia I-11 which only entered production when the firm was bought by AISA shortly thereafter.
