= Hispano-Suiza E-34 =

1935 Spanish trainer aircraft

E-34
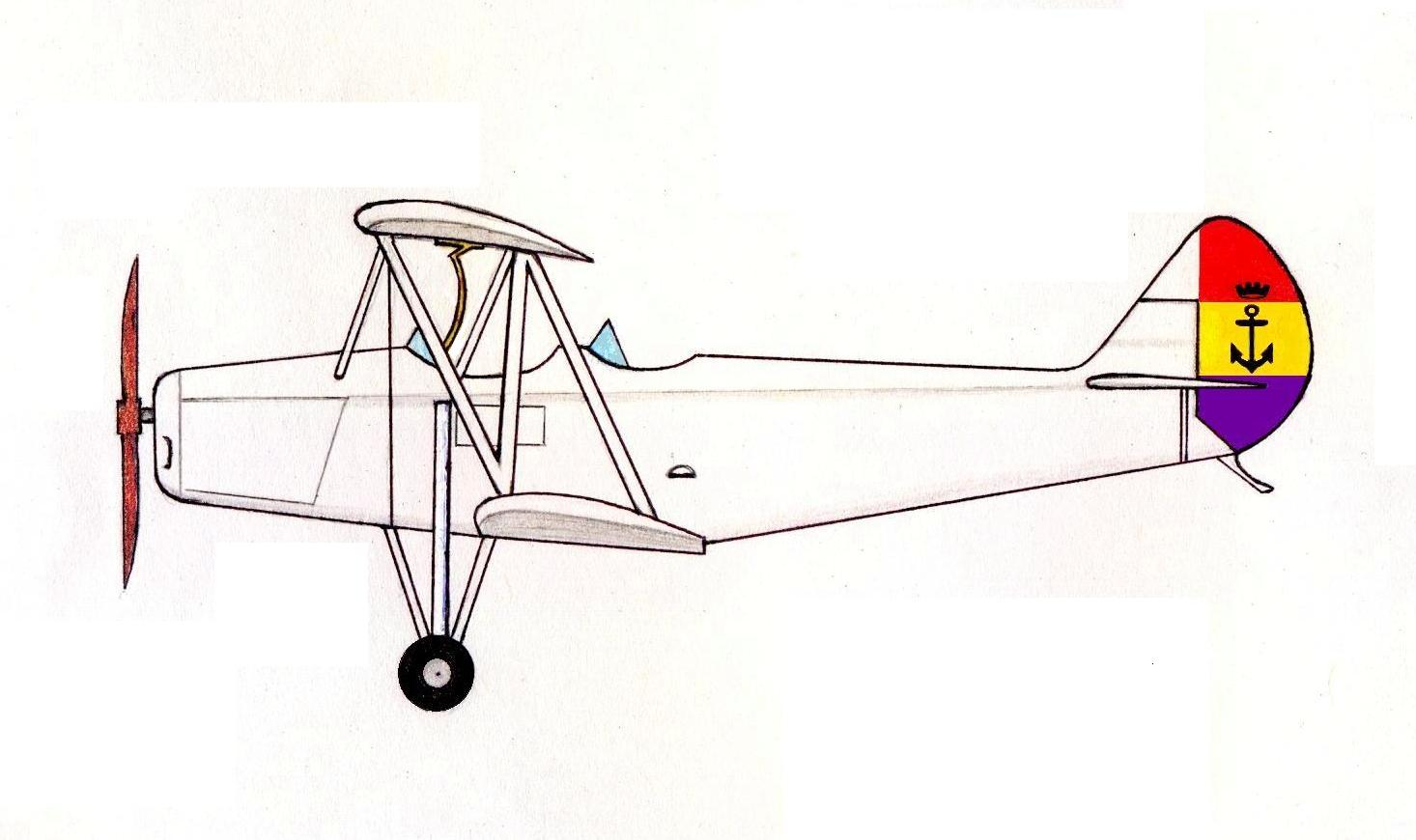
- Hispano-Suiza E-34 in Aeronáutica Naval markings

General information
- Type: Basic trainer
- National origin: Spain
- Manufacturer: Hispano-Suiza
- Designer: Vicente Roa Miranda
- Number built: 6

History
- First flight: c.1935
- Developed from: Hispano-Suiza E-30

The Hispano-Suiza E-34, later renamed Hispano HS-34, was a Spanish single engine, tandem seat biplane, designed as a basic trainer. Twenty five were ordered by the Aeronáutica Naval, but only five had been completed when the Spanish Civil War intervened.

== Design and development ==
In 1934, the Aeronáutica Militar called a competition for a Spanish-designed and built basic trainer. Three companies responded, including Hispano-Suiza.

The E-34 was a single engine biplane, seating two in tandem. It had unswept single bay wings of the same span and constant chord, with some stagger. The wings were fabric-covered wooden structures. Only the lower wing carried dihedral. The N-shaped interplane struts were assisted by flying wire bracing. The upper wing was supported over the fuselage by a pair of N-shaped struts to the upper fuselage longerons. The upper centre section had a large cut-out in its trailing edge for better upward visibility, and also contained the fuel tank. Ailerons were fitted only on the lower wing. The HS-34 had its tailplane mounted on top of the fuselage, carrying split elevators. The rudder was horn balanced.

The E-34 had a rectangular cross-section fuselage formed from steel tubing with internal wire bracing. Its cockpits were open. The undercarriage used a pair of internally sprung mainwheels with balloon tyres and a tailskid. A split axle was mounted on a short V-strut below the fuselage. On the prototype, the undercarriage main legs were short, mounted on the lower fuselage longerons and assisted by short forward struts. The second prototype and production aircraft had longer legs fixed to the upper longerons. The prototype and production series aircraft were powered, as the rules of the competition required, by a 105 hp (78 kW) Walter Junior four-cylinder inverted inline engine, although the second prototype was fitted with the more powerful 130 hp (97 kW) de Havilland Gipsy Major of the same configuration.

== Operational history ==
The E-34 did not win the Aeronáutica Militar competition, and was therefore not ordered by them, but the Aeronáutica Naval placed an order for twenty five in August 1935. Only five had been built before the Spanish Civil War put an end to production of non-combat aircraft.

In 1935, before the Spanish Civil War, the second prototype, with its Gipsy engine, new undercarriage and Handley Page slots was displayed at the International Exposition held at Montjuich. Following the restructuring of the Republican Armed Forces in September 1936, the Aeronáutica Naval was merged with the Aeronáutica Militar in order to form the Spanish Republican Air Force.

=== Post Civil War, the Hispano HS-34 ===
Hispano-Suiza became Hispano Aviación after the Spanish Civil War. In 1941 a final unit was assembled using recovered parts of an E-34 and a Gipsy engine. Hispano had hopes of restarting production, suggesting the HS-34 might find a rôle as a glider tug. On 18 April 1942, a successful test took place, flown by the usual Hispano test pilot Fernando Floes Solis, but the type was not accepted by the military. Instead, it flew with the civil Aero Club of Seville. Lage suggests that this aircraft may be the HS-41 referred to in the 1942 Hispano catalogue.

== Aircraft on display ==
Hispano E-34 EC-AFJ, ex-AdE E.34-1 is on display at the Museo del Aire, Madrid.

== Specifications (Walter Junior engine) ==
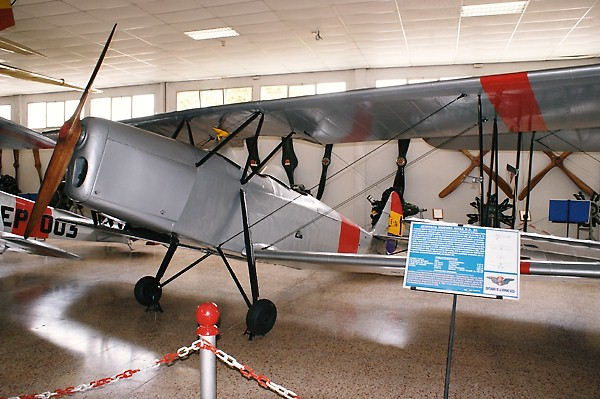
Hispano-Suiza E-34 with Spanish Republican Air Force markings. Museo del Aire, Cuatro Vientos, Madrid.

Data from Lage

General characteristics

- Crew: 2
- Length: 7.34 m (24 ft 1 in)
- Wingspan: 9.1 m (29 ft 10 in)
- Height: 2.54 m (8 ft 4 in)
- Wing area: 25.50 m^{2} (274.5 sq ft)
- Empty weight: 522 kg (1,151 lb)
- Gross weight: 773 kg (1,704 lb)
- Fuel capacity: 100 L (22 Imp gal, 26.4 UKS gal)
- Powerplant: 1 × Walter Junior 4-cylinder inverted inline piston engine, water cooled, 78 kW (105 hp)
- Propellers: 2-bladed

Performance

- Maximum speed: 170 km/h (110 mph, 92 kn)
- Cruise speed: 130 km/h (81 mph, 70 kn)
- Stall speed: 65 km/h (40 mph, 35 kn)
- Range: 350 km (220 mi, 190 nmi)
- Service ceiling: 3,000 m (9,800 ft)
- Time to altitude: 7 min to 1,000 m (3,280 ft)

== Operators ==
Spain

- Spanish Republican Navy - Aeronáutica Naval

Spain (Spanish State)

- Spanish Air Force

== See also ==
Related lists

- List of Interwar military aircraft
- List of aircraft of the Spanish Republican Air Force
