= Fokker C.IV =

1923 Dutch two-seat reconnaissance aircraft

C.IV
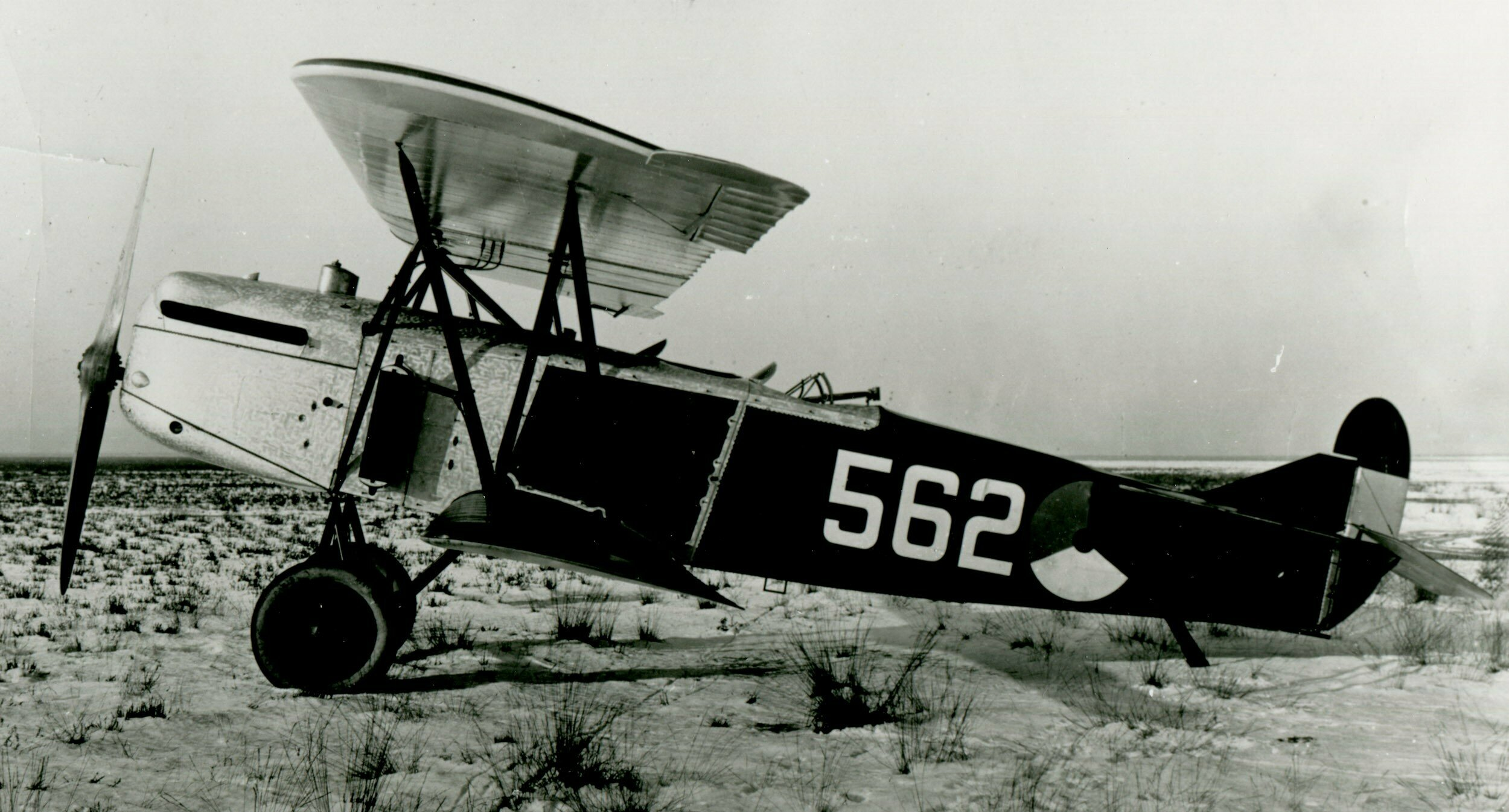

General information
- Type: Two-seat reconnaissance aircraft
- Manufacturer: Fokker
- Primary users: Dutch Army Air Corps United States Army Air Service; USSR
- Number built: 159

History
- Introduction date: 1924
- First flight: 1923

The Fokker C.IV is a 1920s Dutch two-seat reconnaissance aircraft that was designed and built by Fokker.

== Design and development ==
The C.IV was developed from the earlier C.I but it was a larger and more robust aircraft. The C.IV was designed as a reconnaissance biplane with a fixed tailwheel landing gear and was originally powered by the Napier Lion piston engine. It had a wider fuselage and wider track of the cross-axle landing gear than the C.I.

== Operational history ==
Examples of the C.IV were delivered to both the Dutch Army Air Corps (30 aircraft) and the Dutch East Indies Army (10 aircraft). It was also exported; the USSR bought 55 aircraft and the United States Army Air Service acquired eight. Twenty aircraft were licensed built in Spain by the Talleres Loring company for the Spanish Army's Aeronáutica Militar. After service as reconnaissance machines the aircraft were then operated as trainers into the 1930s.

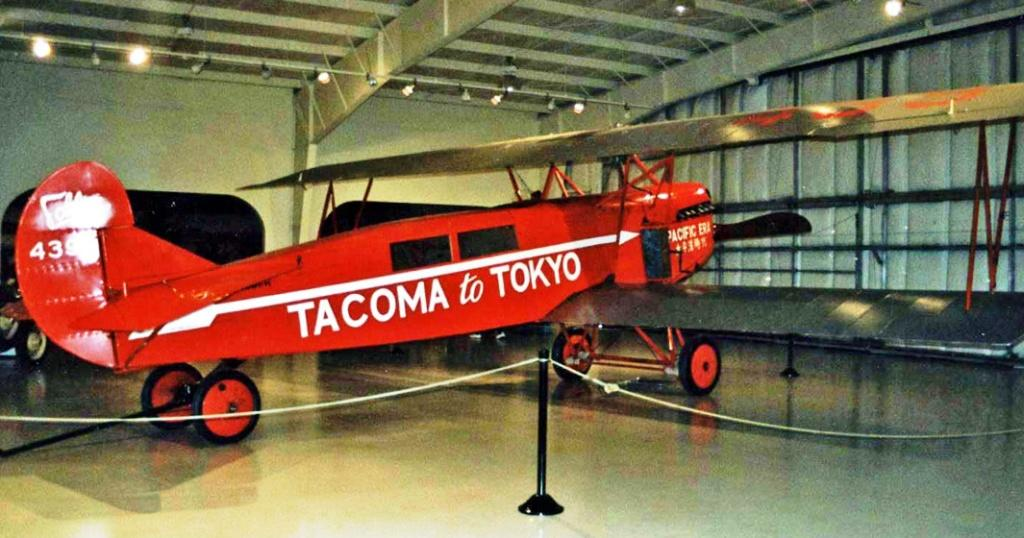
Fokker C.IVA modified with cabin for passengers for planned non-stop flight Tacoma-Tokyo. Preserved airworthy in Owls Head Museum, Maine.

The last flying example of a C.IV is C.IVa s/n4127/N439FK with a Rolls-Royce Eagle VIII engine, preserved at the Owls Head Transportation Museum in Owls Head, Maine. It was used in a trans-Pacific attempt in the late 1920s or early 1930s. Pilots Bob Wark and Eddie Brown took out the seats in the passenger compartment and installed a large fuel tank. They also put a small cockpit just in front of the vertical stabilizer with a hand-powered fuel pump inside. In flight, the crew member sitting there would transfer fuel to the main tank in the wing, where it would be fed by gravity into the engine. In this trans-Pacific attempt they planned not to go straight across the Pacific but up the West Coast of North America to Alaska and down the chain of Aleutian Islands, proceeding down the Chinese coast to Tokyo. They took off from Tacoma, Washington and started to head north, but made it only about 100 miles of the way to Vancouver, British Columbia when the engine vapor locked and forced a landing in a field. They had to dump most of their fuel to bring down the weight in order to take off from the field. When they got back in the air, they started heading for nearby Ladner Field, Vancouver to top off the tanks, but they crashed upon landing and decided to give up. They loaded the C.IV onto a Ford AA flatbed truck and brought it back to Washington State. It ended up in Ephrata, Washington, where it was kept outdoors and was eventually badly burned in a grass fire. It sat until 1970, when one of the museum's trustees found it and restored it and donated it to the museum.

== Variants ==
C.IV
Production version with a 336 kW (450 hp) Napier Lion engine.
C.IVA
A reduced wing-span version (12.50 m/41 ft) and reduced takeoff weight. Built for the Dutch East Indies Army. powered by a Rolls-Royce Eagle VIII V-12 engine
C.IVB
As C.IV but using a Rolls-Royce Eagle or Liberty L-12 engine.
C.IVC
Long-range reconnaissance version with extended wingspan (14.27 m/46 ft).
C.IV-W
Extended wingspan as C.IVC and fitted with twin-floats and Napier Lion engine.

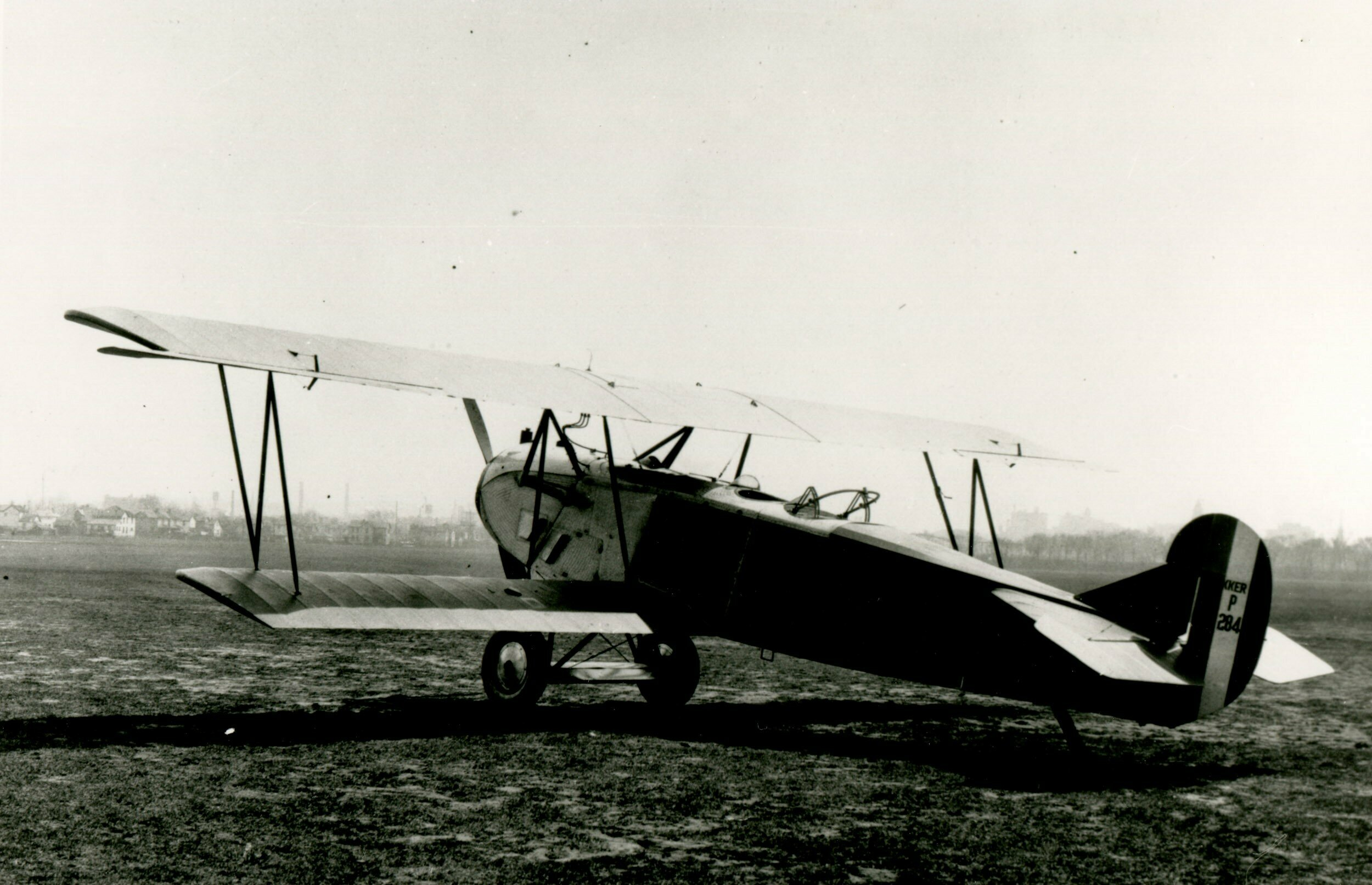
Fokker CO-4A scout aircraft.

C.IVH
Special version for a flight between Amsterdam and Tokyo in 1924.
XCO-4
United States Army designation for three aircraft for evaluation.
CO-4A
United States Army designation for five production aircraft powered by 313 kW (420 hp) Liberty L-12A engine and fuselage extended by 24 cm (9½ in).
AO-1
United States Army designation for an artillery spotting version modified from one of the XCO-4s

== Operators ==
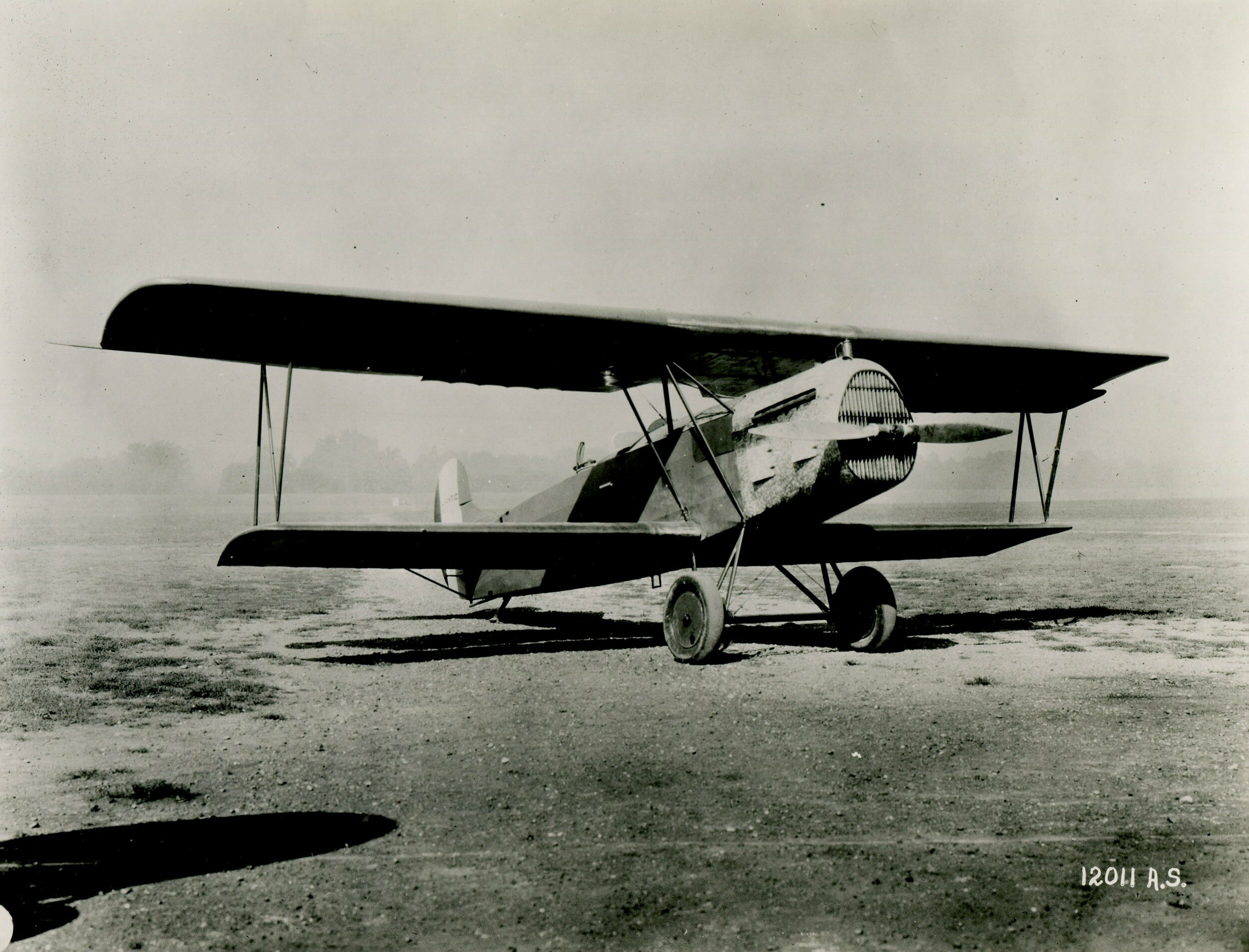
Fokker AO-1 in US service.

Netherlands

- Dutch Air Force

Spain

- Aeronáutica Militar

United States

- United States Army Air Service

Soviet Union

- Soviet Air Force

== Specifications (C.IV) ==
Data from The Illustrated Encyclopedia of Aircraft (Part Work 1982-1985), 1985, Orbis Publishing, Page 1858

General characteristics

- Crew: 2
- Length: 9.20 m (30 ft 2 in)
- Wingspan: 12.90 m (42 ft 3 in)
- Height: 3.40 m (11 ft 1 in)
- Wing area: 39.20 m^{2} (421.96 sq ft)
- Empty weight: 1,450 kg (3,197 lb)
- Gross weight: 2,270 kg (5,004 lb)
- Powerplant: 1 × Napier Lion W-12 water-cooled piston engine , 336 kW (450 hp)

Performance

- Maximum speed: 214 km/h (133 mph, 116 kn)
- Range: 1,200 km (746 mi, 648 nmi)
- Service ceiling: 5,500 m (18,000 ft)

Armament

- 1 or 2 × fixed forward-firing 7.7 mm (0.303 in) machine-guns, and twin cockpit-mounted guns

== See also ==
Aircraft of comparable role, configuration, and era

- Loring R-1

Related lists

- List of military aircraft of the United States
