= Cuatro Vientos =

Coordinates: 40°22′39″N 3°47′28″W

- City neighborhood
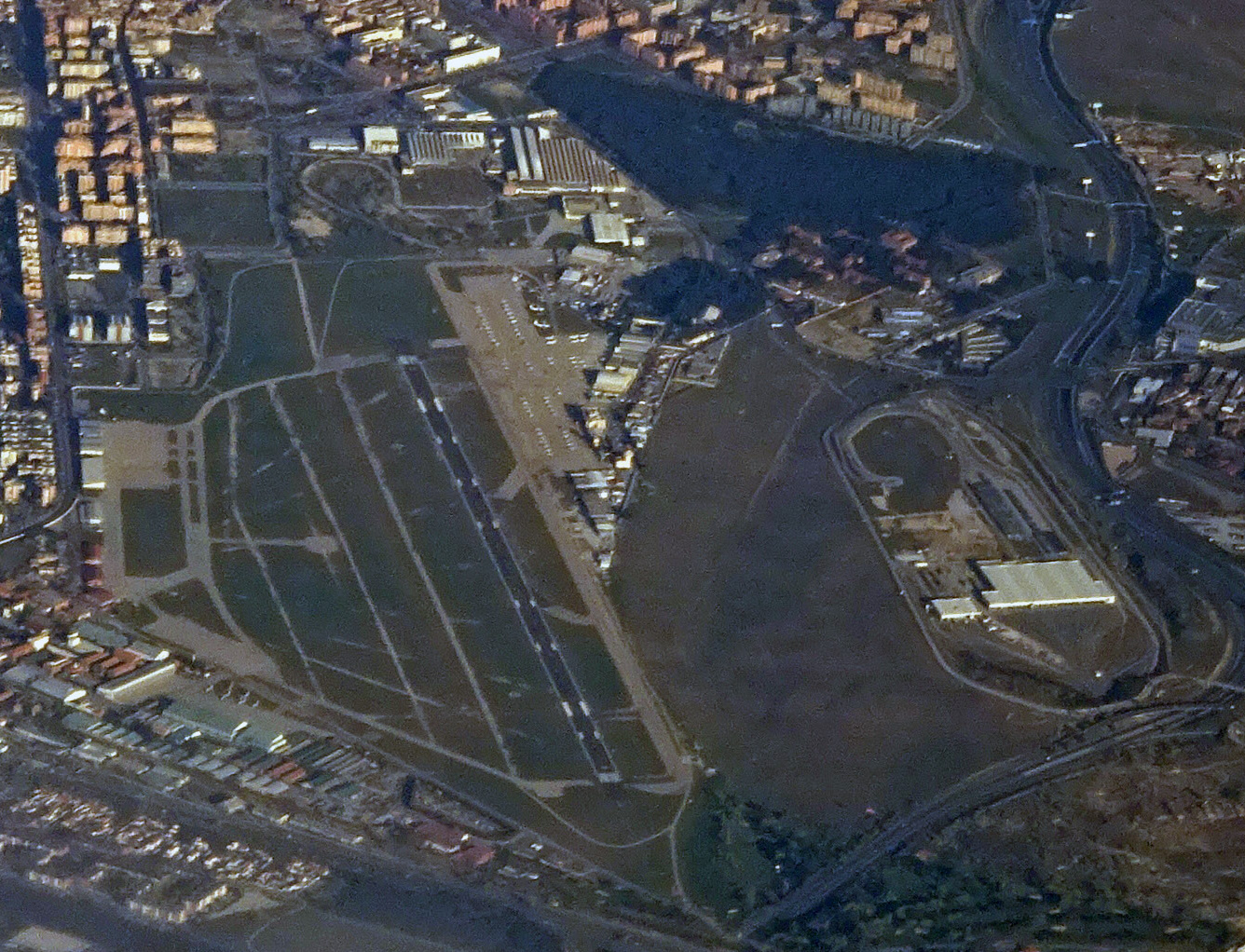
- Interactive map of Cuatro Vientos
- Country: Spain
- Region: Community of Madrid
- Municipality: Madrid
- District: Latina

Cuatro Vientos is an administrative neighborhood (barrio) of Madrid belonging to the district of Latina.

== Geography ==
Cuatro Vientos is situated in the south-western area of central Madrid, close to the motorways A5 and M40 and to the homonymous airport.
