= Holland H.1 =

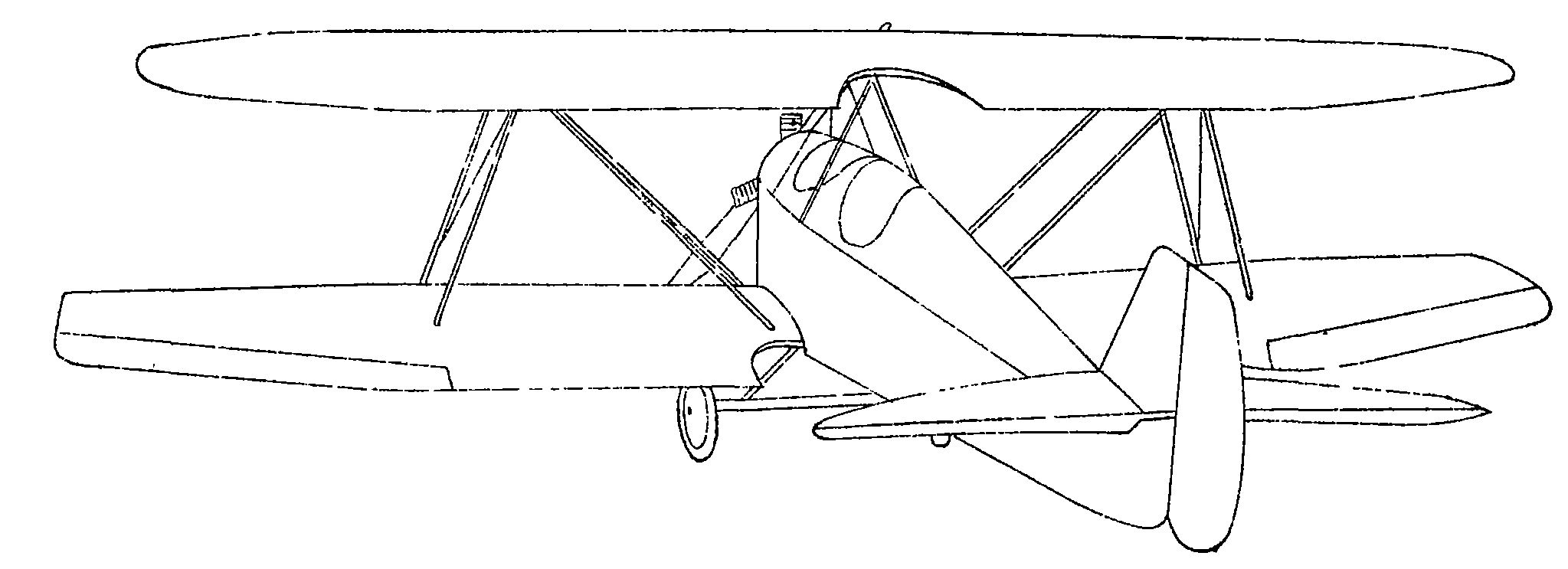

General information
- Type: Basic trainer aircraft or tourer
- National origin: Netherlands
- Manufacturer: Vliegtuig-Industrie Holland (VIH)
- Designer: Joop Carley, Theo Slot and Van der Kwast
- Number built: 1

History
- First flight: Late March-early April 1924

The VIH Holland H.1 was a Dutch two seat, low-powered biplane. Only one was built.

== Design and development ==
By late 1923 Joop Carley had already designed and built the single seat Carley C.12 monoplane and received funding from Vliegtuig Industrie Holland (VIH) for its development. He set up Carley's Aeroplanes Company for the purpose and also designed a new two seat biplane. The expense of the C.12 development, called the C.12a, forced Carley Aircraft into liquidation and VIH took over the company's stock, including the biplane which they called the Holland H.1. Its development was led by Theo Slot and Van der Kwast.

The Holland H.1 was a small, unequal span biplane with a lower wingspan 4% greater than the upper. Both wings were essentially rectangular in plan and built around pairs of spruce box-spars, with plywood leading edges and fabric covering elsewhere. They were braced together as a single bay structure by inward-leaning N-form interplane struts between the spars, strengthened by diagonal pairs of parallel struts from their tops to the lower wing root. Only the lower wings had dihedral and only they carried the H.1's narrow chord, unbalanced ailerons. The upper wing was held well above the fuselage by a pair of parallel, transverse, inverted V-struts and a strongly rearward-leaning upright V-strut from the forward fuselage.

The H.1 was powered by a 22–26 kW (30–35 hp), three cylinder radial Anzani engine externally mounted on the nose. The plywood-covered fuselage was rectangular in section and flat-sided apart from the upper surface which was essentially an extended head-fairing for the pilot's cockpit, very like that of the Carley C.12. The pilot was placed at the trailing edge, where circular cut-outs in both the upper and lower wings improved his field of view. The passenger or pupil's cockpit was immediately ahead of thim at mid-chord.

At the rear the straight-edged tailplane was mounted on top of the fuselage. Its angle of incidence was adjustable, though sources differ on whether this could be done in-flight or only on the ground. The fin was built into the fuselage structure; early photographs, taken before the H.1's registration, show the original profile of the vertical tail was trapezoidal and again very like that of the Carley C.12. It was later redesigned; images recorded after its registration as H-NACD in the summer of 1924 show a roughly quadrantal fin with a pointed, vertically-edged rudder. In both forms the rudder ran down to the keel, working in a cut-out in the broad-chord elevator. The rear control surfaces, like the ailerons, were unbalanced.

The Holland H.1 had a conventional fixed tailskid undercarriage with its mainwheels on a single axle and a track of 1.4 m (55 in). The axle was mounted via bungee shock absorbers to short vertical legs with and rearward drag struts, both attached to the lower fuselage longerons.

== Operational history ==
The H.1 was flown for the first time in late March or early April 1924 by Reparlier at Waalhaven.

At the beginning of May VIH entered the C.12a and the H.1 into the Tour de France contest, which was to be held between 24 July and 10 August, starting and finishing in Paris. In all, fifteen aircraft were entered. The H.1 was to fly as a single seater, a Tour class which was limited to aircraft with engines of less than 2,000 cm^{3} (120 cu in), so the 2,029 cm^{3} (123.8 cu in) Anzani needed some minor modification to reduced its capacity to 1,995 cm^{3} (121.7 cu in).

On 11 July the single seat Holland H.2, a development of the C.12a with a new fuselage and a vertical tail revision like that made to the H.1, took its first flight and VIH decided to enter it, rather than the H.1, in the Tour.

Little more is known about the career of the H.1, though it was advertised for sale in June 1925. VIH went bankrupt in 1924, their assets acquired by Pander & Son.

== Specifications ==
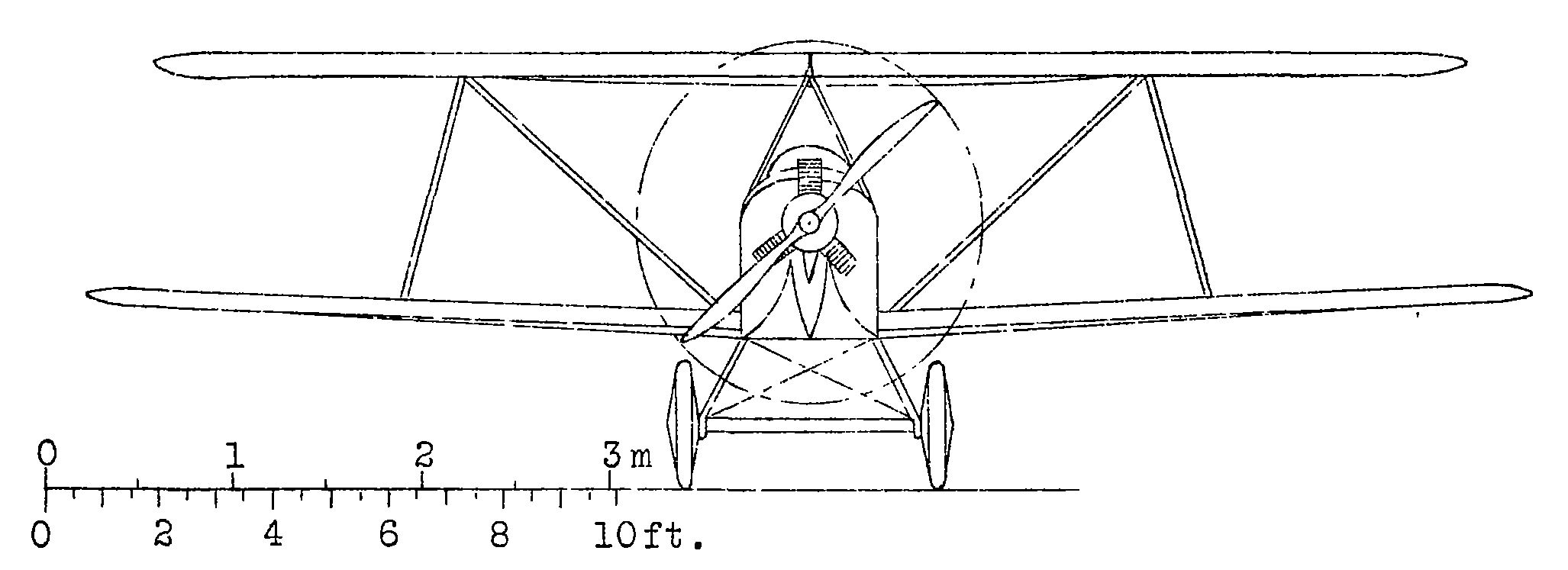
Holland H.1 front view drawing from NACA-TM-301

Data from Les Ailes, May 1924

General characteristics

- Length: 6.40 m (21 ft 0 in)
- Upper wingspan: 7.50 m (24 ft 7 in)
- Lower wingspan: 7.80 m (25 ft 7 in)
- Wing area: 14 m^{2} (150 sq ft)
- Empty weight: 220 kg (485 lb)
- Gross weight: 395 kg (871 lb)
- Fuel capacity: 38 L (8.4 imp gal; 10 US gal)
- Powerplant: × Anzani 3-cylinder radial, 22–26 kW (30–35 hp)
- Propellers: 2-bladed, 1.80 m (5 ft 11 in) diameter

Performance

- Maximum speed: 115 km/h (71 mph, 62 kn)
- Endurance: 3 hr
- Landing speed: 35 km/h (22 mph; 19 kn)
