= Sikorsky S-4 =

S-4
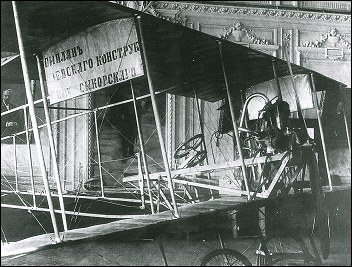
- S-4 displayed at an exhibition in Kharkov in the spring of 1911

General information
- Type: Experimental
- National origin: Russian Empire
- Designer: Igor Sikorsky
- Number built: 1

History
- Introduction date: 1911
- Developed from: Sikorsky S-3

The Sikorsky S-4 was a Russian aircraft built by Igor Sikorsky using many components of the S-3 including the 40 hp (30 kW) Anzani three-cylinder engine. Construction of the biplane began in late December 1910 and was completed early in the spring of 1911. The machine appeared in a static display at an aeronautical exhibition at Kharkov in the spring of 1911, but was never flown. Some time afterward it was disassembled.

== Specifications ==
Data from Russian Aviation Museum

General characteristics

- Crew: One
- Length: 26 ft 3 in (8 m)
- Upper wingspan: 29 ft 6 in (9 m)
- Wing area: 300 sq ft (28 m^{2})
- Empty weight: 573 lb (260 kg)
- Gross weight: 794 lb (360 kg)
- Powerplant: 1 × Anzani 3 -cylinder air-cooled fan piston engine, 40 hp (30 kW)

Performance
