= V39 =

V39 may refer to:

- ARL V 39, a French self-propelled gun prototype
- Fokker V.39, a German sport aircraft prototype
- LFG V 39, a German biplane trainer aircraft
