= Pander D =

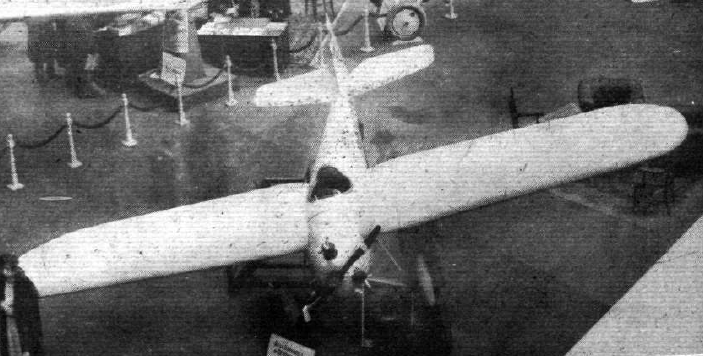
- Pander D at the Paris Aero Show 1924

General information
- Type: Single seat sport monoplane
- National origin: Netherlands
- Manufacturer: Nederlandse Fabriek van Vliegtuigen H. Pander & Zonen
- Designer: Theo Slot
- Primary users: Netherlands Naval Aviation Service Royal Netherlands East Indies Army
- Number built: 10

History
- First flight: 16 November 1924
- Developed from: Holland H.2

The Pander D was a small Dutch single-seat sport monoplane, an evolution of the Carley C.12 of 1923. Ten were built.

== Design and development ==
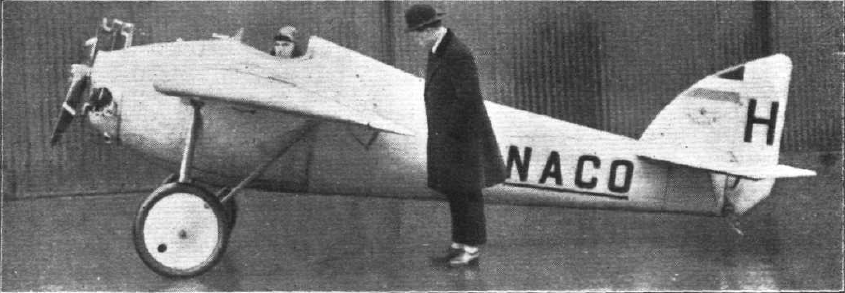
Pander D at Croydon

When Vliegtuig Industrie Holland (VIH) (English: Aircraft Industry Holland) became insolvent in 1924, Its core staff and property were bought by H. Pander who set up Nederlandse Fabriek van Vliegtuigen H. Pander & Zonen (English:Dutch Aircraft Factory H. Pander & Sons) to produce aircraft. Their first design was a modified Holland H.2, an aircraft which VIH had derived from the Carley C.12. All were small, single-seat, shoulder wing monoplanes powered by a single three-cylinder Anzani producing about 22 kW (30 hp). The Pander D had the much more streamlined, rounded fuselage, quadrant shaped fin and faired headrest that VIH had used with the H.2; compared with the C.12, the Pander's wings were more tapered, had rounded tips and lacked the large cutouts in the trailing edge roots. The trailing edges of the elevators were unswept, not forward swept as on the C.12.

The Pander D had a single piece, two spar wing which was attached to the upper fuselage longerons with pairs of yoked U-bolts. The spars were of the box type with spruce flanges and plywood webs, the front one forming a narrow chord D-box with ply covering around the wing leading edge. Aft of the front spar, the wing and ailerons, the latter mounted on false spars, were fabric covered. Similar methods were used in the tail structure.

The fuselage was a monocoque structure of longerons and hoops, covered in three-ply. The fuselage was flat sided but deep and carefully made upper and lower fairings produced its overall rounded look. The high quality and lightness of the woodworking was remarked upon; Pandar had built his reputation and fortune in the furniture trade. As on the earlier versions of the Carley C.12 the cockpit was between the wing spars, faired by a coaming with a circular cutout. The fixed, conventional undercarriage was also similar to that of the C.12, with steel V-form struts hinged on the upper longerons supporting, via rubber shock absorbers, the landing wheels and outer ends of split axles, hinged to the central fuselage underside. The inverted Y-Anzani had a smooth, rounded cowling through which much of its cylinders protruded. It drove a two-bladed propeller.

The Pandar D flew for the first time on 16 November 1924, with J. van Opstal at the controls.

== Operational history ==
The Pander D appeared in public for the first time at the Paris Aero Show, where it was exhibited both on the Pander stand and in the air. It was offered for sale at £450. The second prototype visited Croydon, UK for several days at the end of April 1925, giving demonstrations and being flown by many pilots. In August, one was in the UK again, racing at Lympne.

In all ten Pander Ds were built, six as civilians and four military. Two examples were lost on test or delivery flights but two more civilians were sold in France and Spain, another was used for a time by a flying instructor in the Netherlands and a sixth went to the Dutch East Indies. Two Pander Ds were sold to the Netherlands Naval Aviation Service, though mostly used for pleasure flights, and two to the Royal Netherlands East Indies Army who used them for stunt flying at airshows.

== Specifications ==
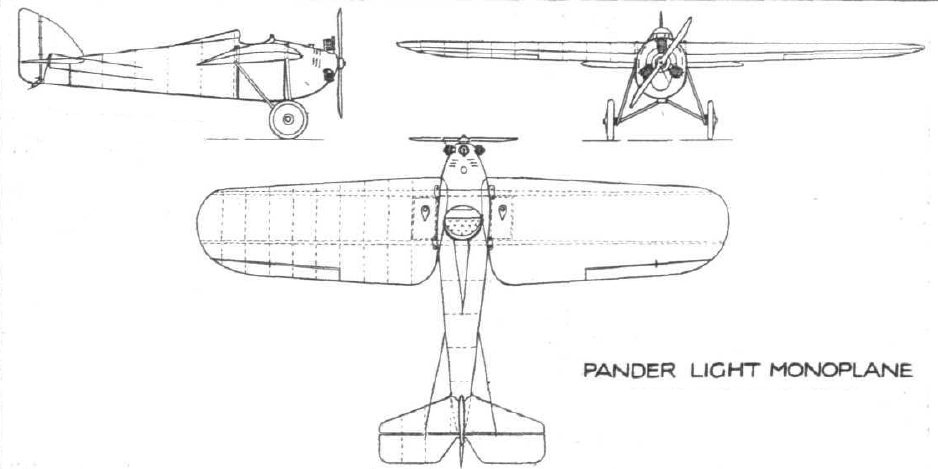

Data from Flight 25 February 1925

General characteristics

- Crew: one
- Length: 4.95 m (16 ft 3 in)
- Wingspan: 8.00 m (26 ft 3 in)
- Wing area: 10.80 m^{2} (116.3 sq ft)
- Empty weight: 175 kg (386 lb)
- Gross weight: 280 kg (617 lb)
- Powerplant: 1 × Anzani 3-cylinder inverted Y-type air cooled, 15 kW (20 hp)
- Propellers: 2-bladed

Performance

- Maximum speed: 130 km/h (81 mph, 70 kn)
- Wing loading: 26 kg/m^{2} (5.3 lb/sq ft)
- Power/mass: 80 W/kg (0.049 hp/lb)
- Landing speed: 40 km/h (25 mph)
