= Stelmaszyk =

Stelmaszyk, or Stelmaszek, is a Polish surname.

== People ==
=== Stelmaszek ===
- Rick Stelmaszek (1948–2017), an American baseball player

=== Stelmaszyk ===
- Agnieszka Stelmaszyk (born 1976), a Polish writer
- Jaclyn Stelmaszyk (born 1986), a Polish-Canadian rower
- Krzysztof Stelmaszyk (born 1959), a Polish actor

== See also ==
- Stelmaszyk S.1 Bożena, a sport aircraft manufactured in 1928
