= Müller G.M.G. II =

G.M.G. II

General information
- Type: Light sports aircraft
- National origin: Germany
- Manufacturer: Gebrüder Müller, Griesheim (G.M.G. or Müller Brothers of Griesheim)

History
- First flight: C.1928

The Müller G.M.G. II was a German single engine, tandem seat sports monoplane from 1928. Its high wing was unusually mounted compared to other monoplanes.

== Design and development ==
The G.M.G. II was a high wing, strut braced monoplane of wooden construction. Its wing had a single spar and was plywood covered from the spar forward to form a torsion resistant D-box. Behind the spar the wing was fabric covered. It was braced on each side with a single, short, airfoil section strut to the lower fuselage longeron and mounted centrally on an arched continuation of the upper fuselage structure from the engine installation, over the tandem cockpits, to behind the seating.

Behind the wing leading edge the fuselage was flat sided and plywood covered. In the nose a three-cylinder Anzani engine was mounted in an inverted Y position, its cylinder heads projecting from a curved, metal cowling with upper concave curvature following the one upright cylinder. This curvature was replicated in the ply covering between the cowling and the front cockpit, giving the pilot a reasonable forward view on either side. Access to the seats was eased by a pair of doors. The G.M.G. II had a simple, fixed, narrow track undercarriage with mainwheels on a rubber sprung single axle mounted on two short legs from the lower fuselage. Behind the rear cockpit the fuselage narrowed vertically to a conventional tail with the tailplane on top of the fuselage and with a tall, tapered, round topped fin and rudder.

The G.M.G. II was first publicly displayed at the Berlin Aero Show of 1928.

== Specifications ==
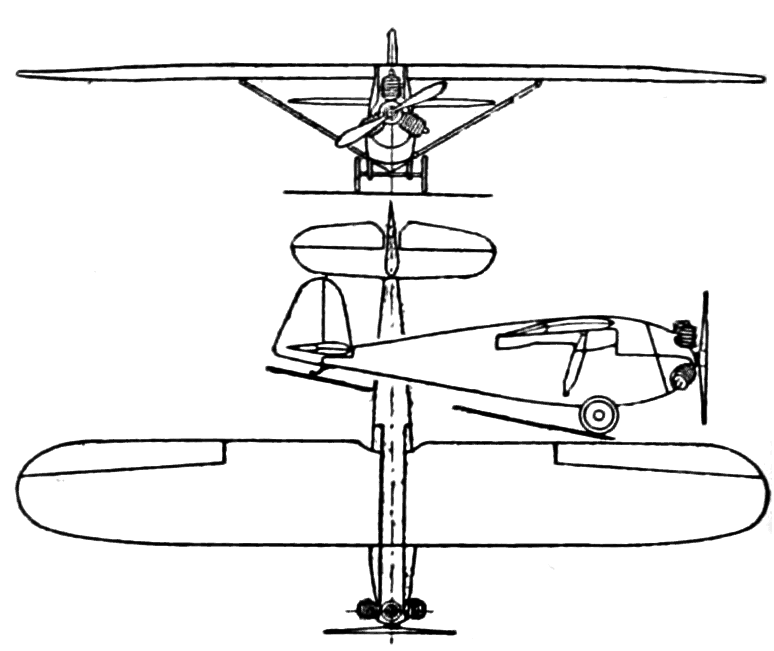
Müller G.M.G. II 3-view drawing from Aero Digest October 1929

Data from Flight, 25 October 1928, p.936

General characteristics

- Capacity: Two
- Length: 6.16 m (20 ft 3 in)
- Wingspan: 11 m (36 ft 1 in)
- Wing area: 16 m^{2} (170 sq ft)
- Empty weight: 275 kg (606 lb)
- Gross weight: 500 kg (1,102 lb)
- Powerplant: 1 × Anzani 3 cylinder inverted Y-type or radial engine, 22 kW (30 hp)
- Propellers: 2-bladed

Performance

- Maximum speed: 136 km/h (85 mph, 73 kn)
- Cruise speed: 130 km/h (81 mph, 70 kn)
- Range: 680 km (420 mi, 360 nmi) at full throttle
- Endurance: 5 hours
- Time to altitude: 7.6 min to 1,000 m (3,281 ft)
- Landing speed: 60 km/h (37 mph)
