= Carley C.12 =

C.12
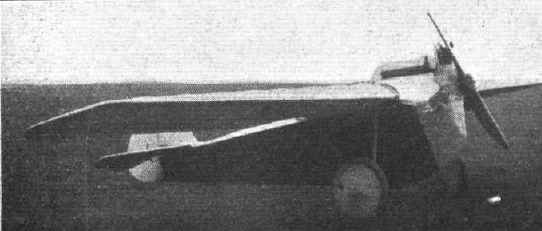
- C.12a

General information
- Type: Single seat sport plane
- National origin: Netherlands
- Manufacturer: Carley's Aeroplanes, Voorburg
- Designer: Joop D. Carley and Theo Slot
- Number built: 12 (all variants)

History
- First flight: 18 June 1923.

The Carley C.12 was a small Dutch single seat sporting monoplane from the 1920s. There were several developments but only small numbers were produced.

== Design and development ==
Like his earlier Carley S.1, Joop Carley's C.12 was a compact single seat monoplane with a shoulder wing. It differed by being much lighter and all of the several engines fitted were much less powerful than the S.1's 37 kW (50 hp) Gnôme. The wing of the C.12 was a cantilever, thick aerofoil section, low aspect ratio structure built around two wooden box spars, covered with three-ply ahead of the forward spar and fabric behind.

The C.12's fuselage was constructed around three wooden longerons and 3-ply bulkheads, giving it a triangular cross section and entirely plywood covered. The cockpit, within a circular cut-out in the wing, placed the pilot high between the wing spars giving him a good forward view. There were sizeable cut-outs in the wing trailing edge to improve his rearward view downward. The empennage was conventional, the one piece elevator having a cut-out for rudder movement. The fixed, conventional undercarriage was of the divided axle type, the axle enclosed within a wooden aerofoil fairing and hinged on the central lower longeron, with its wheels and extremities on rubber sprung V-form struts to the wing roots at the upper longerons. The small, coil sprung tail skid steered with the rudder.

For its first flight on 18 June 1923 at Waalhaven the C.12 had an 1,180 L (73 cu in) engine from a two-cylinder Indian Chief motorcycle, producing about 7.5 kW (10 hp); this was not satisfactory and was replaced by a slightly more powerful, four cylinder Sergant A air-cooled engine, which in turn proved unreliable. Despite these problems Vliegtuig Industrie Holland (VIH), in English Aircraft Industry Holland, took an interest in what had become known as the "flying bicycle" and funded Carley, who had set up Carley's Aeroplanes Co. for the purpose, to fit an Anzani inverted Y-type air-cooled engine which produced about 15 kW (20 hp), mounted in the nose on a steel ring and driving a two blade propeller. At this point the aircraft was redesignated as the C.12a and later a headrest, faired aft into the fuselage, was added.

The cost of the refurbishment of the C.12 was much higher than Carley had indicated to VIH and in the spring of 1924 he was pressed into leaving VIH and liquidating Carley's Aeroplanes. VIH then acquired its assets, including the C.12a which remained on the Dutch register until February 1925. They also produced a developed version called the Holland H.2, engineered by Theo Slot, one of the original designers, with H. Van der Kwast, Carley's Aeroplanes' old manager. The most obvious change was to the shape of the fuselage which was now rounded rather than triangular and much less deep at the nose, where the Anzani engine was retained. The fin was also reshaped into a circular quadrant. It first flew on 11 July 1924.

The final version followed the insolvency of VIH during 1924 and its acquisition by H. Pander, previously the owner of a furniture factory, who then set up Nederlandse Fabriek van Vliegtuigen H. Pander & Zonen (Dutch Aircraft Factory H. Pander & Son). The first flight of the H.2 redesign, called the Pander D, was on 16 November 1924. It had the same tail and engine as the Holland H.2 but the wing plan was altered to have more taper and rounded tips, as well as a greater span. Its weight was slightly up and the maximum speed reduced by about 25%.

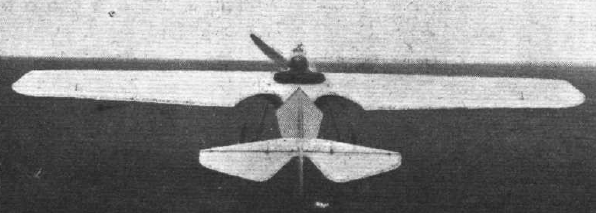
Carley C.12a

== Operational history ==
On 18 December 1923, not long after the C.12a's first flight with the Anzani engine in October, the Belgian pilot Raparlier flew it from Waalhaven, Rotterdam to Le Bourget, Paris via Brussels. The whole flight took just under six hours, despite a one-hour stop in Brussels and a head wind on the second leg, slowing him down and forcing him to land near Le Bourget for extra fuel. The flight drew much attention; after a large number of demonstration flights in Paris Raparlier returned the C.12a to Waalhaven on 22 February 1924, again getting press attention.

After an attempt to compete with both the C.12a and the H.2, following the latter's successful first flight on 11 July, in the eight leg Tour de France des Avionettes was foiled by arguments over rules, the latter went for testing with the Marine-Luchtvaartdienst (MLD) but no sales resulted. It remained with Pander after his take-over but crashed fatally, from a spin, early in 1927.

Two Pander Ds were sold to the MLD, mostly used for pleasure flights, two to the KNIL who used them for stunt flying at airshows. Of six more civilian examples two were lost on test or delivery flights, two more were sold in France and Spain, one went to the Dutch East Indies and the other was used for a time by a flying instructor in the Netherlands.

== Variants ==
Data from Wesselink

C.12
Original aircraft with Indian Chief then Sergant engine. First flew 18 June 1923.
C.12a
Re-engined with 20 hp Anzani. First flew in October 1923. Faired headrest added.
Holland H.2
Major fuselage and fin redesign by H. Van der Kwast and Theo Lock at VIH. First flight 11 July 1924.
Pander D
Further development of the H-2. First flight 16 November 1924.

== Specifications (C.12a) ==
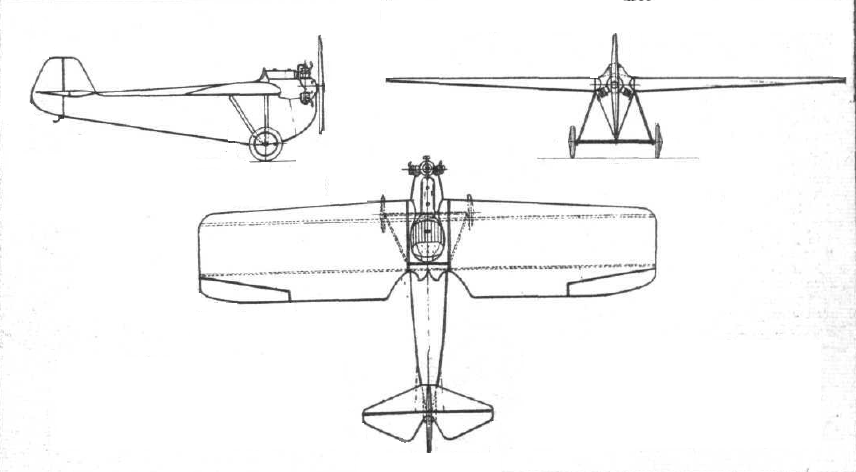
Carley C.12a

Data from

General characteristics

- Crew: One
- Length: 4.80 m (15 ft 9 in)
- Wingspan: 7.50 m (24 ft 7 in)
- Wing area: 10.13 m^{2} (109.0 sq ft)
- Empty weight: 185 kg (408 lb)
- Gross weight: 225 kg (496 lb)
- Powerplant: 1 × Anzani 3-cylinder inverted Y-type air cooled, 15 kW (20 hp)
- Propellers: 2-bladed Pierre Levasseur, 1.7 m (5 ft 7 in) diameter

Performance

- Maximum speed: 140 km/h (87 mph, 76 kn)
- Stall speed: 35 km/h (22 mph, 19 kn)
- Endurance: 3.5 h
- Wing loading: 19 kg/m^{2} (3.9 lb/sq ft)
- Power/mass: 74.5 W/kg (0.045 hp/lb)
