= Fokker V.40 =

Fokker V.40 may refer to:

- Fokker V.40, lighter (35 horse powered) version of WWI Fokker V.39
- Fokker V.40 or Fokker V-40, experimental (400 horse powered) version of Fokker D.X
