= Sikorsky S-1 =

S-1
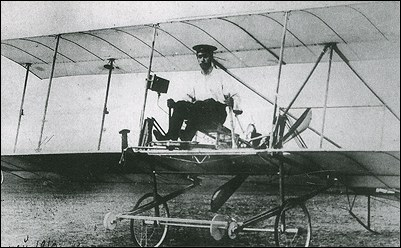
- Igor Sikorsky and the S-1 near Kiev, Russian Empire in May 1910

General information
- Type: Prototype
- National origin: Russian Empire
- Designer: Igor Sikorsky
- Number built: 1

History
- First flight: May 1910
- Developed into: Sikorsky S-2

The Sikorsky S-1 was the first fixed-wing aircraft design by Igor Sikorsky. In February 1910 work began on the pusher configured biplane powered by a 15 hp (11 kW) Anzani three-cylinder, air-cooled engine. The machine was completed in April and Sikorsky began his first attempts at flight. In early May during a take-off attempt on a windy day the machine briefly became airborne due mostly to a favorable headwind. Further attempts were less successful, and Sikorsky disassembled it, saving the main wing section to construct the S-2.

== Specifications ==
Data from Russian Aviation Museum

General characteristics

- Crew: One
- Length: 26 ft 3 in (8 m)
- Upper wingspan: 26 ft 3 in (8 m)
- Wing area: 260 sq ft (24 m^{2})
- Empty weight: 397 lb (180 kg)
- Gross weight: 551 lb (250 kg)
- Powerplant: 1 × Anzani 3 -cylinder air-cooled fan piston engine, 15 hp (11 kW)

Performance

== See also ==
Related development

- Sikorsky S-2
