= Pander S-4 Postjager =

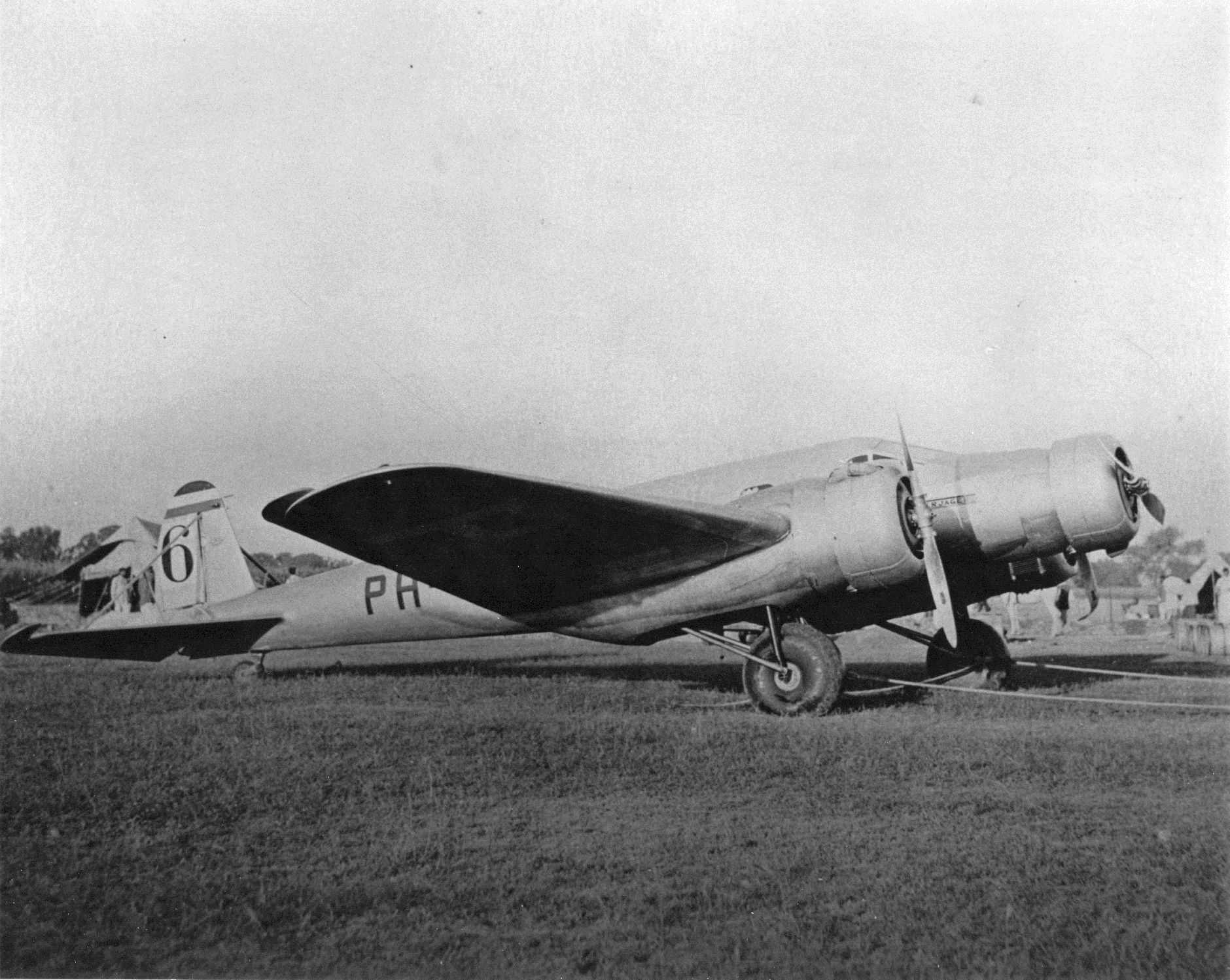
- Postjager at Allahabad

General information
- Type: Mailplane
- National origin: Netherlands
- Manufacturer: Pander & Son
- Designer: Theo Slot
- Status: Destroyed
- Number built: 1

History
- First flight: 6 October 1933

The Pander S-4 Postjager was a 1930s Dutch three-engined mailplane designed and built by Pander & Son. Only one was built which was destroyed during the MacRobertson Air Race.

== Design and development ==
The S-4 was designed as a fast mailplane for the service between the Netherlands and the Dutch East Indies. It was a three-seat low-wing monoplane powered by three 420 hp (313 kW) Wright Whirlwind radial engines. It had a conventional retractable landing gear with a tailwheel. The S-4, registered PH-OST, first flew on 6 October 1933.

== Operational history ==
In December 1933 it was decided to fly the initial proving flight of the Postjager to Batavia, Dutch East Indies (now Jakarta, Indonesia), with the aircraft carrying 270 kg (600 lb) of Christmas mail. It set off on 9 December, but lost oil pressure in the starboard engine over southern Italy, and was forced to stop at Grottaglie airfield near Brindisi. The mail was transferred to a Fokker F.XII and a Fokker F.XVIII and flown to the East Indies, while the Postjager waited for a replacement engine to be delivered from the United States. It left Italy of 28 December and arrived in Batavia on 31 December, with a toal flight time of 45 hours. It made the return flight to the Netherlands from 6 January to 11 January. In 1934 the S-4 was entered into the MacRobertson Air Race between London and Melbourne. It left Mildenhall in England on 20 October 1934 and after 36 hours arrived at Allahabad, India. The aircraft was delayed when the landing gear was badly damaged on arrival at Allahabad. It was ready to leave on 26 October but while taxiing for departure it hit a motor car and burst into flames and was destroyed; the crew jumped out and escaped injury.

== Specifications ==
Data from Flight 5 October 1933, The "Aerial Phost", Jane's all the World's Aircraft 1934, Pander S.4 Postjager Trimotor Mailplane

General characteristics

- Crew: 3
- Capacity: 500 kg
- Length: 12.5 m (41 ft 0 in)
- Wingspan: 16.6 m (54 ft 6 in)
- Height: 2.9 m (9 ft 6 in)
- Wing area: 44.98 m^{2} (484.2 sq ft)
- Empty weight: 3,025 kg (6,669 lb)
- Gross weight: 5,500 kg (12,125 lb)
- Fuel capacity: Fuel:2,100 L (550 US gal; 460 imp gal); Oil:130 L (34 US gal; 29 imp gal)
- Powerplant: 3 × Wright Whirlwind 9-cylinder air-cooled radial engines, 310 kW (420 hp) each

Performance

- Maximum speed: 370 km/h (230 mph, 200 kn)
- Cruise speed: 300 km/h (190 mph, 160 kn)
- Landing speed: 95–100 km/h (59–62 mph; 51–54 kn) Flaps down
- Range: 2,430 km (1,510 mi, 1,310 nmi)
- Service ceiling: 5,400 m (17,700 ft)
