= Sikorsky S-3 =

S-3
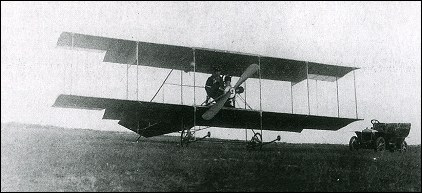
- Sikorsky S-3 near Kiev Russia Empire December 1910

General information
- Type: Experimental
- National origin: Russian Empire
- Designer: Igor Sikorsky
- Number built: 1

History
- First flight: December 1910
- Developed from: Sikorsky S-2
- Developed into: Sikorsky S-4

The Sikorsky S-3 was an early Russian single seat biplane design by Igor Sikorsky. Work on the machine started in July 1910 and was completed in late November.

== Design and development ==
The S-3 was a larger improved version of the S-2 with a more powerful 40 hp (30 kW) Anzani three-cylinder engine. The main wings were manufactured in a more uniform manner with the ribs held to a closer tolerance and the fabric covering was of better quality. Other refinements included larger ailerons and faster-responding flight control surfaces.

== Operational history ==
The S-3 exhibited performance superior to the S-2, and Sikorsky made a dozen successful flights starting early in December. The S-3 made its last flight on December 13, 1910 when at an altitude of 90 feet the engines distributor shifted to a retarded position and lost power. The aircraft landed hard on a frozen pond, broke through the ice and sank causing serious damage. The S-3 was salvaged and some parts including the engine were used in the construction of the S-4.

== Specifications ==
Data from Russian Aviation Museum

General characteristics

- Crew: One
- Length: 26 ft 3 in (8 m)
- Upper wingspan: 26 ft 3 in (8 m)
- Wing area: 260 sq ft (24 m^{2})
- Empty weight: 485 lb (220 kg)
- Gross weight: 683 lb (310 kg)
- Powerplant: 1 × Anzani 3 -cyl. air-cooled fan piston engine, 40 hp (30 kW)

Performance

- Service ceiling: 98 ft (30 m)
