= Sikorsky S-2 =

Type of aircraft

S-2
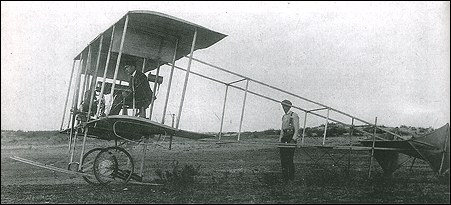
- Igor Sikorsky at the controls of the S-2 near Kiev, Russian Empire in June 1910

General information
- Type: Experimental
- National origin: Russian Empire
- Designer: Igor Sikorsky
- Status: Destroyed during testing
- Number built: 1

History
- First flight: 3 June 1910
- Developed from: Sikorsky S-1
- Developed into: Sikorsky S-3

The Sikorsky S-2 was the second fixed-wing aircraft designed by Igor Sikorsky using the main wing section from the S-1 and a 19 kW (25 hp) Anzani 3 three-cylinder engine in a tractor configuration. During the first flight attempt on June 3, 1910, the biplane reached a height of two to four feet and traveled approximately 200 m (200 yd). After several successful flights, the S-2 was destroyed on June 30 when Sikorsky inadvertently stalled the underpowered aircraft at an altitude of 20 m (70 ft).

== Specifications ==
Data from Russian Aviation Museum

General characteristics

- Crew: One
- Length: 8 m (26 ft 3 in)
- Upper wingspan: 8 m (26 ft 3 in)
- Wing area: 24 m^{2} (260 sq ft)
- Empty weight: 190 kg (419 lb)
- Gross weight: 260 kg (573 lb)
- Powerplant: 1 × Anzani 3 -cylinder air-cooled fan piston engine, 19 kW (25 hp)

Performance

== See also ==
Related development

- Sikorsky S-1
- Sikorsky S-3
