= W engine =

Type of internal combustion engine

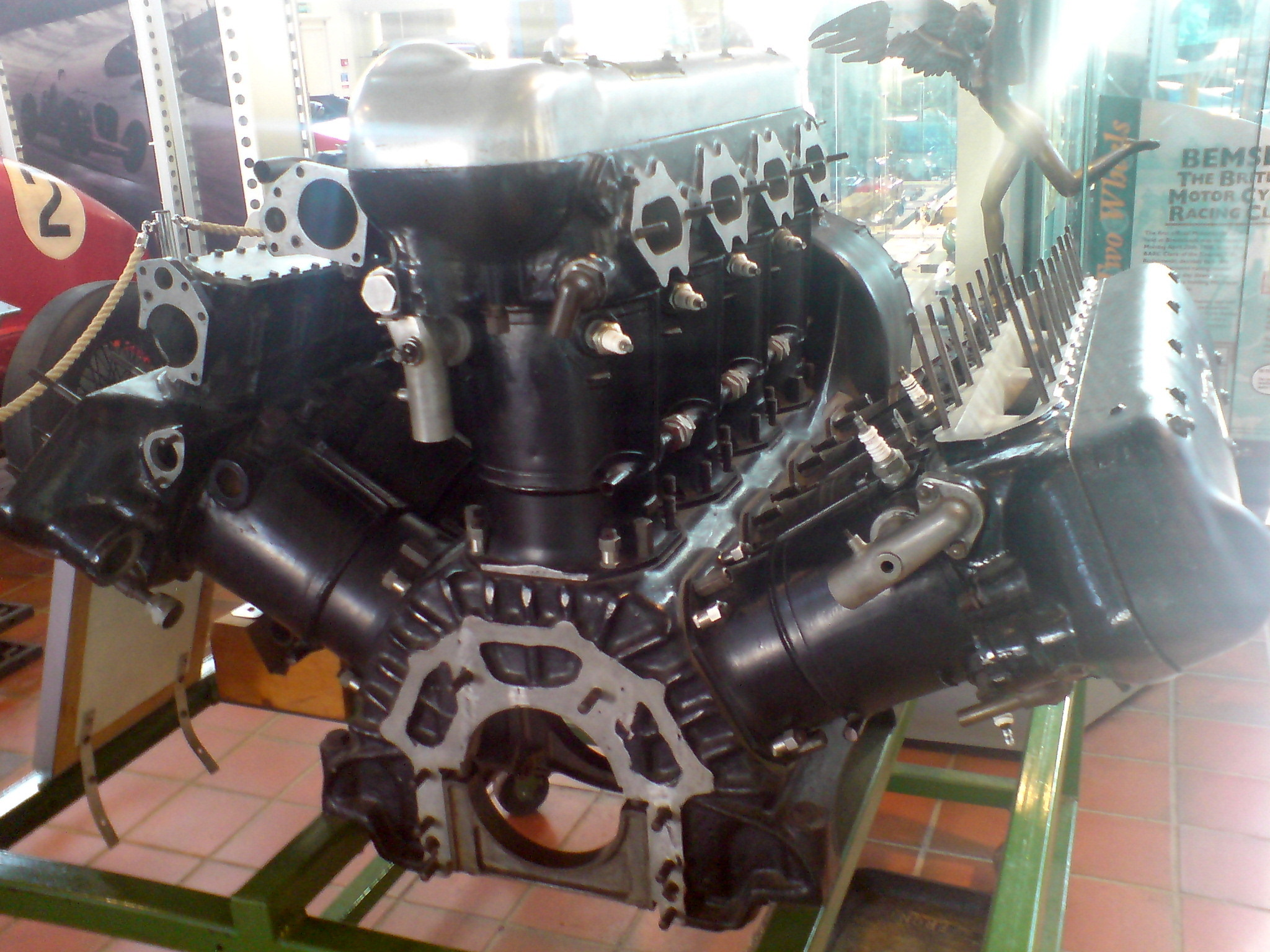
Napier Lion W12 aircraft engine (circa 1930)

A W engine is a type of piston engine where three or four cylinder banks share the same crankshaft, resembling the letter "W" when viewed from the front.

W engines with three banks of cylinders are also called "broad arrow" engines, due to their shape resembling the British government broad arrow property mark.

The most common W-type engine is the 2-bank type, with the Volkswagen Group experimenting with the Passat W8 and its 4.0 liter, 2-bank W8 engine and later implementing the concept with the group's Bentley division, creating a 6.0 liter W12 in both naturally aspirated and turbocharged variants. Due to the pre-existing VR-type engine only needing one cylinder head with one bank of cylinders, a Volkswagen 2-bank W-type engine is structured more similarly to a conventional 2-bank V engine as opposed to a "true" W engine.

W engines are significantly less common than V engines. Compared with a V engine, a W engine is typically shorter but wider. In Volkswagen’s case, this allows for superior packaging in engine compartments intended for 6 and 8 cylinder engines, the Passat W8 being one such example.

== W3 engines ==
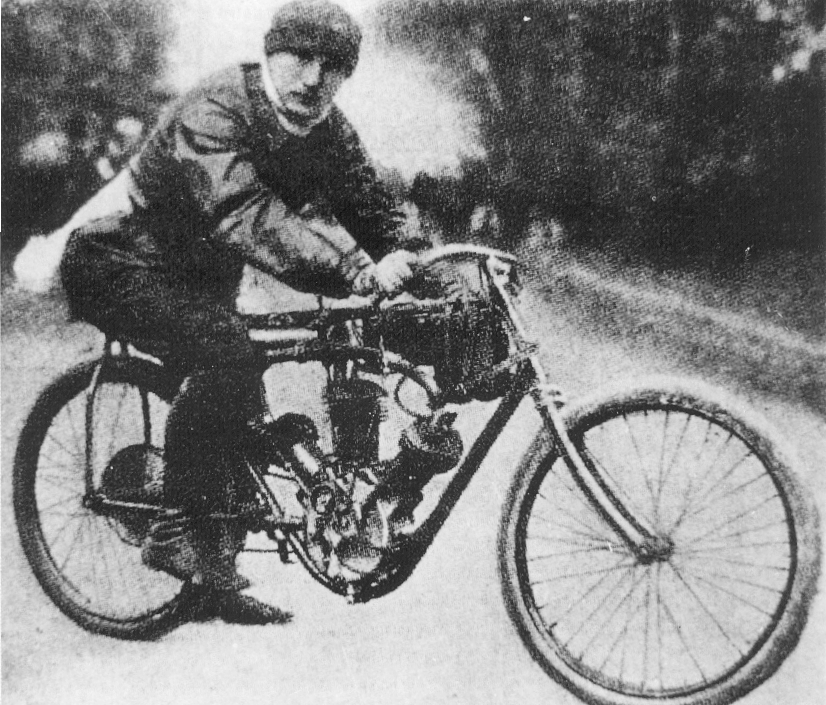
1906 Anzani 3-cylinder motorcycle engine

One of the first W engines was the Anzani 3-cylinder, built in 1906, to be used in Anzani motorcycles. This W3 engine also powered the 1909 Blériot XI, the first airplane to fly across the English Channel.

The Feuling W3 is a 2.5 L (153 cu in) motorcycle engine that was built by an aftermarket parts company in the United States in the early 2000s. Like radial aircraft engines it has a master connecting rod and two slave rods connected to the pistons.

== W6 engines ==
The Rumpler Tropfenwagen had a Siemens and Halske-built 2,580 cc (157 cu in) overhead valve W6 engine, with three banks of paired cylinders, all working on a common crankshaft.

== W8 engines ==
The sole W8 engine to reach production is the Volkswagen Group W8 engine automotive engine, which used a four-bank design and was produced from 2001-2004.

== W12 engines ==
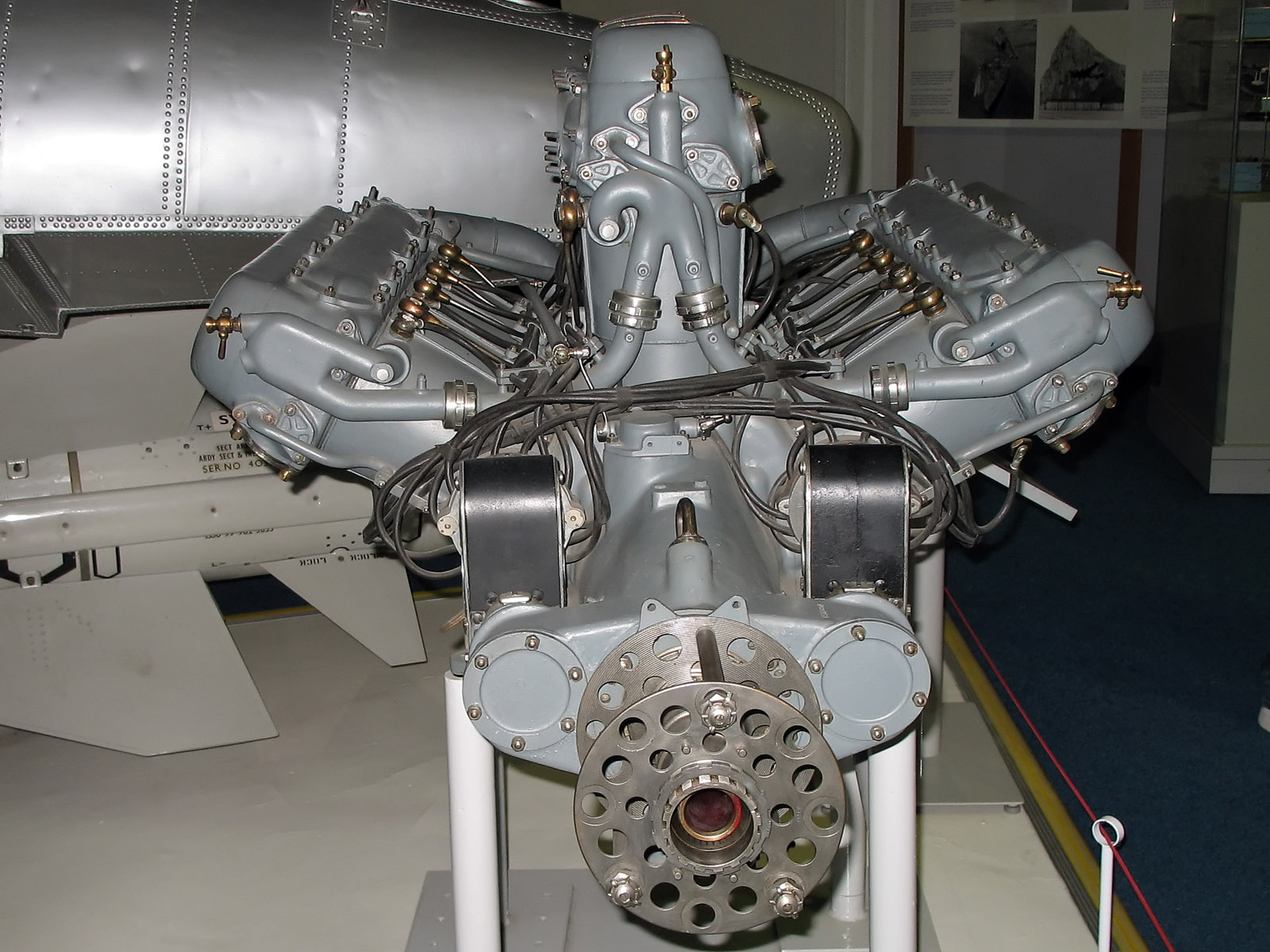
Napier Lion VII

W12 engines with three banks of four cylinders were used by several aircraft engines from 1917 until the 1930s. A three-bank W12 design was also used unsuccessfully by the Life F1 team in the 1990 Formula One season, failing to qualify at every race.

Although less commonly used in automobiles than V12 engines, a W12 petrol engine has been produced by the Volkswagen Group starting in 2001. This four-bank engine—based on two VR6 engines with a common crankshaft—has been used in various cars sold under the Audi, Bentley and Volkswagen brands and has appeared in multiple variants, including a rare 6.3L normally aspirated version only available in the D4 Audi A8 L. In 2018 the Volkswagen Group announced the W12 engine would be exclusive to vehicles produced by their Bentley division

== W16 engines ==
W16 engines are rarely produced, with the notable exception of the Volkswagen Group 8.0 WR16 engine that has been used since 2005. The W16 type of engine can also be found in the Bugatti Veyron, Chiron, Divo and their related models.

== W18 engines ==
Operation of a three-bank W engine

The W18 layout is rarely used, with the only production examples being several aircraft during the 1920s and 1930s, and CRM Motori SpA marine engines.

In 2025 Porsche patented a new three-bank W18 engine with 3 turbochargers.

== W24 engine ==
The Allison V-3420, manufactured by the Allison Engine Company, is an example of a W24 engine.

== W30 engine ==
The Chrysler A57 multibank, essentially five 250.6 cu in (4.1 L) Chrysler flathead engines driving one output shaft through a gear train, saw action during World War II. Developed in 1941, it would be used inside variants of the M3 Lee and M4 Sherman tanks, all deployed on the Western Front. The A57 is the only example of a five-bank W configuration.

== See also ==
- VR6 engine
