= Pander P-3 =

General information
- Type: Two seat sports aircraft
- National origin: Netherlands
- Manufacturer: Nederlandse Fabriek van Vliegtuigen H. Pander & Zonen (Pander & Sons)
- Number built: 1

History
- First flight: 1931-2

The Pander P-3 was a parasol wing, two seat, single engine sports aircraft designed in the Netherlands in the early 1930s. Only one was built.

== Design and development ==
The P-3 was the third of a series of parasol wing, single engine, two seat light aircraft built around 1930 by the Dutch company Pander & Sons, the earlier ones being the almost identical P-1 and P-2. The P-3 differed considerably from these in its engine, fuselage, fin and undercarriage, and later in its career its accommodation.

The near constant chord wing was similar to those of the earlier models and was again braced with two parallel struts from the lower fuselage longerons, assisted centrally by cabane struts. The fuselage was different; deeper and more obviously flat sided, it had rounded upper decking only. The installation of a 120 hp (90 kW) inverted Gipsy III required a notably different forward fuselage to those of the earlier models with their lower power, upright Gipsy Is. The tandem cockpits were, like those of the P-1 and P-2, placed under the mid-chord and trailing edge of the wing and were initially open but later they were enclosed under a single, long, multi-part canopy. The undercarriage was also new; each mainwheel was mounted on a hinged V-form strut from the lower fuselage longerons with a compression leg to the upper longeron. An inverted V strut, hinged to the central fuselage underside, provided lateral stability. This conventional undercarriage was completed with a tailskid. At the rear the tailplane was, as before, mounted on top of the fuselage but the revised fin had a straight, swept leading edge.

The P-3 flew for the first time in late 1931 or early 1932. Only one was built.

== Operational history ==
The sole P-3 was registered as PH-AIK in February 1932 in the name of a private owner. He and others flew it in the Netherlands and elsewhere, visiting the UK later that year. In May 1933 it was written off in an accident at Almelo.

== Specifications ==
Data from Wesselink

General characteristics

- Length: 6.80 m (22 ft 4 in)
- Wingspan: 9.40 m (30 ft 10 in)
- Powerplant: 1 × de Havilland Gipsy III 4-cylinder air-cooled inline, 89 kW (120 hp)
- Propellers: 2-bladed

Performance

- Maximum speed: 210 km/h (130 mph, 110 kn)
