= Pander & Son =

Dutch aircraft company

H. Pander and Son Dutch Aircraft Company
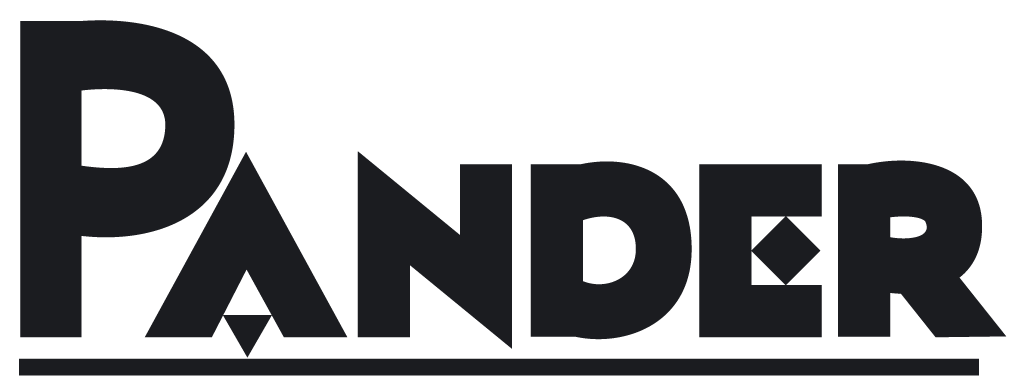
- Native name: Nederlandse Fabriek van Vliegtuigen H. Pander & Zonen
- Industry: Aviation
- Founded: The Hague, The Netherlands (1924)
- Founder: Harmen and Henk Pander
- Defunct: 1934
- Fate: Wound up
- Headquarters: The Hague, Netherlands
- Key people: Theo Slot
- Products: Various aircraft

Pander & Son was a Dutch aircraft company based in The Hague, founded by Harmen Pander and his son Henk Pander.

== History ==
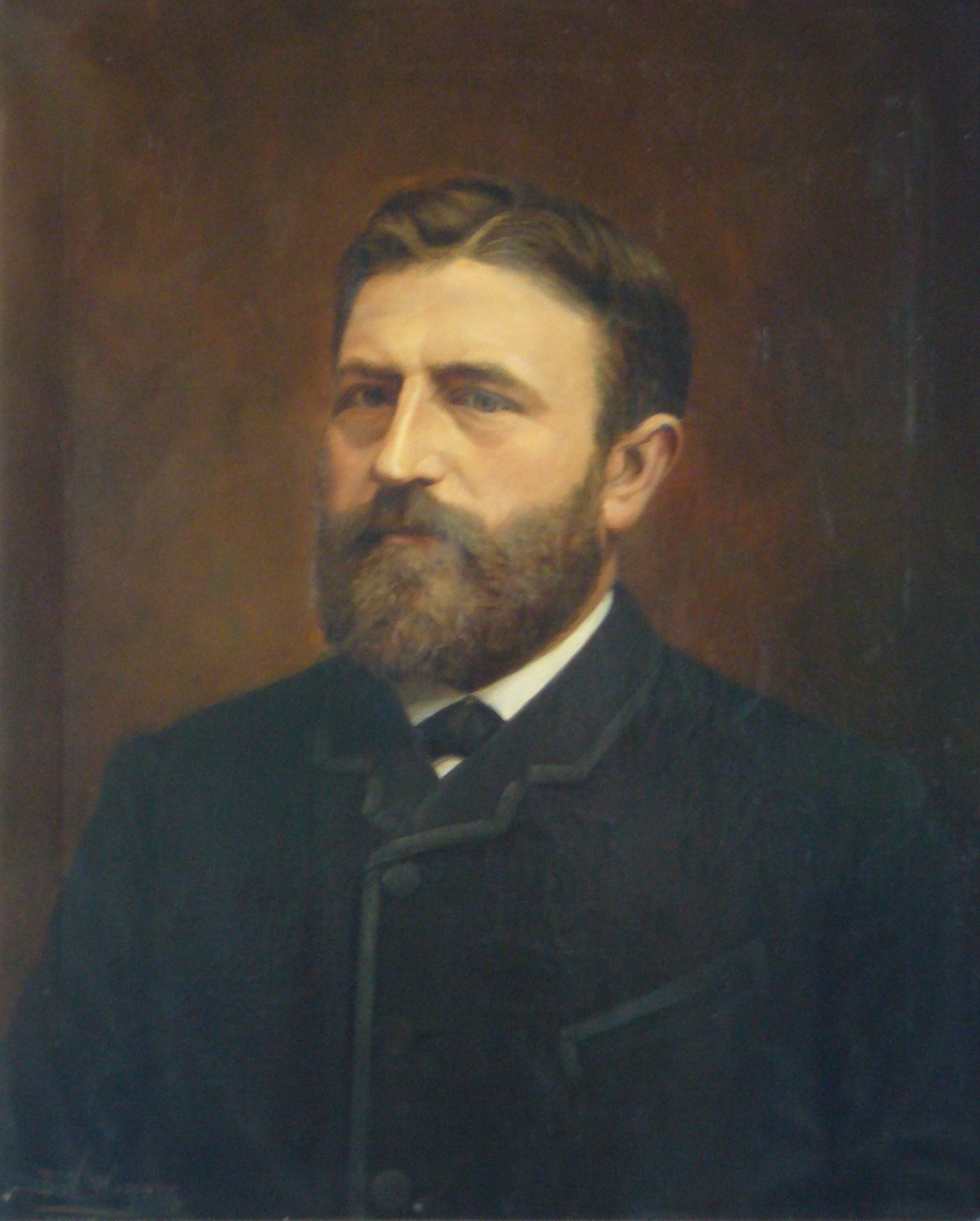
Henk Pander

Harmen Pander was the managing director of a furniture company which in 1924 bought the assets of the bankrupt Vliegtuig Industrie Holland (VIH) company, which included the services of designers Theodorus Egbert Slot and H. Van der Kwast. Pander set up the Nederlandse Fabriek van Vliegtuigen H. Pander & Zonen ("H. Pander and Son Dutch Aircraft Company") and began construction of an improved version of the VIH Holland H.2, renamed the Pander D.

In 1929 the German sailplane builder Alexander Lippisch came to the Netherlands prompting Theo Slot to build the first Dutch glider in 1930. This aircraft, the P-1 Zögling, was a copy of the Stamer and Lippisch Z-12 Zögling.

The company built a small number of trainer and sporting aircraft, perhaps the most well-known aircraft being the Pander S4 Postjager, designed by Theo Slot. The design was suggested by pilot Dirk Asjes, who was critical of the slow development of Dutch airmail flights. He asked Pander to build a special mail plane. This was designated the S.4, and was known as the Postjager or Panderjager (and later, due to its mechanical unreliability, as the Pechjager - "Pech" being Dutch for "breakdown").

In October 1933 this aircraft flew to the Netherlands East Indies. It made an emergency landing in Italy, but eventually arrived at Batavia after 72 hours and 20 minutes in the air.

In 1934 it took part in the MacRobertson London to Melbourne Air Race. At Allahabad, India, the landing gear was damaged on landing. This was repaired, but the aircraft collided with a motor tractor on take off, crashed, and was burnt out. The crew escaped unharmed. This disaster meant the end for the Pander company which was wound up.

== World War II ==
During World War II Henk Pander, an enthusiastic member of the Dutch Nazi Party (NSB), refounded the company and built 555 SG-38 gliders for the German paramilitary NSFK, and repaired German aircraft. After the war Henk Pander was arrested and tried for collaboration.

== Pander aircraft ==
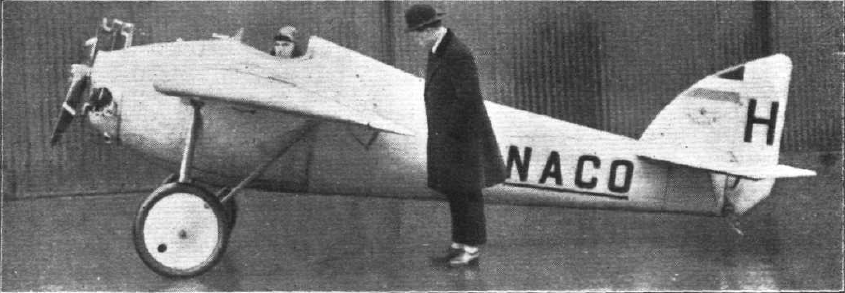
Pander D

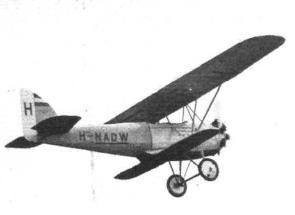
Pander E

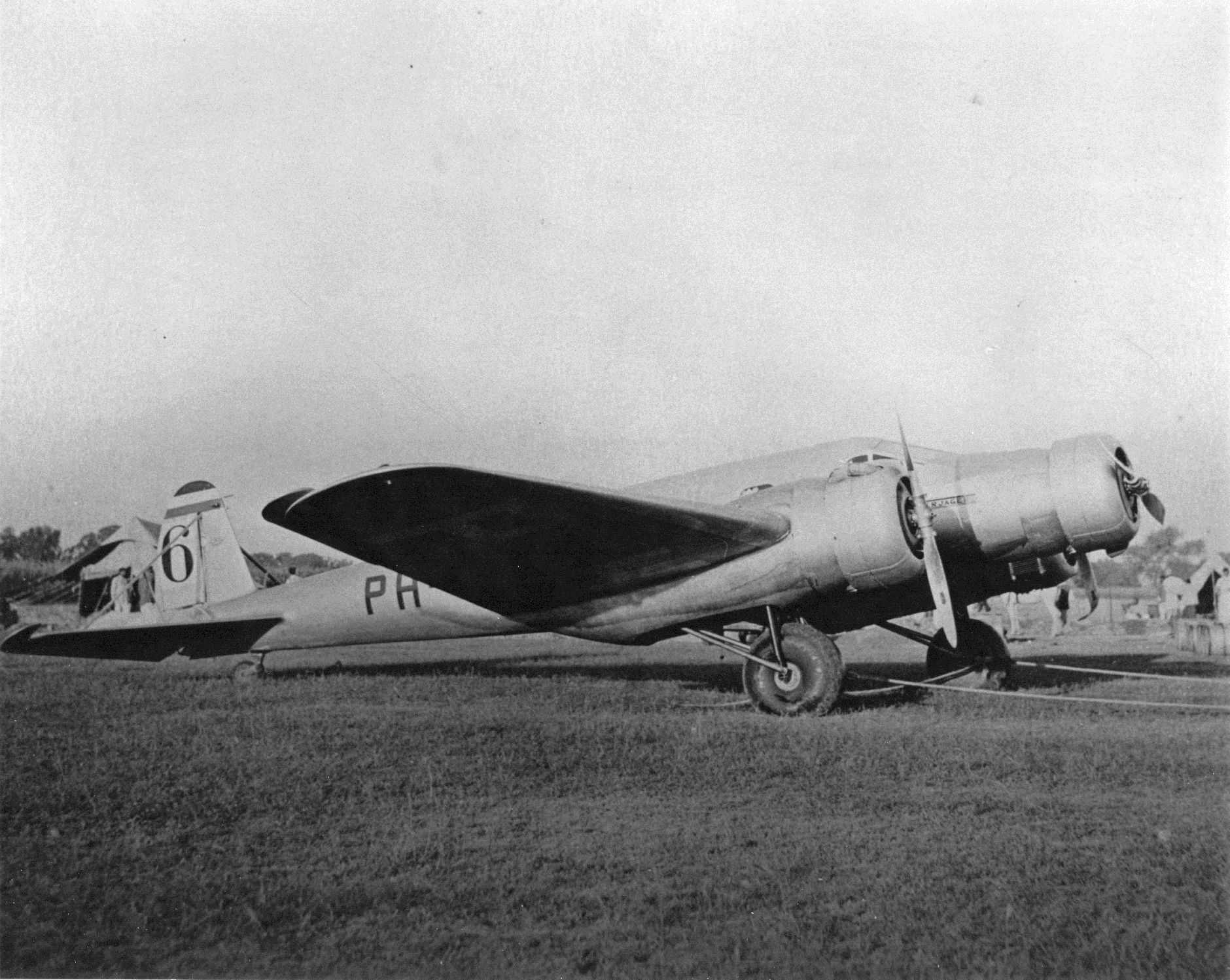
Pander S4

Pander D (1924)

- A single-engined, single-seat monoplane military trainer. This was an improved version of the Holland H.2 - itself an improved version of the Carley C.12. Seven aircraft were built and served with the MLD and the LA-KNIL (later the ML-KNIL).

Pander E or EG-100 (1926)

- A single-engined, one/two-seat sesquiplane. The most successful Pander aircraft. Seventeen were built specially for the Dutch Aviation School (NLS). In 1932, the Pander E Adelaar ("Eagle") flew to the Netherlands East Indies and back.

Pander P-1/P-2 "Gypsy Pander" (1929)

- A single-engined, two-seat, high-wing sports plane. The aircraft was reasonably successful as race plane, but only two were built.

Pander PH-1 Zögling (1930)

- The first sailplane built in the Netherlands, a copy of the Zögling design of Alexander Lippisch. A replica can be seen at the Aviodrome Dutch aircraft museum.

Pander P-3 (1932)

- A single-engined, one/two seat high-wing aircraft. Only one was built.

Pander Multipro (1932)

- A single-engined, three-seat, high-wing sport plane. Three were built.

Pander S4 Postjager (1933)

- A three-engined, three-seat, low-wing mail plane. Only one was built, which was destroyed in a taxiing accident during the 1934 MacRobertson Air Race between London and Melbourne.
