= Stelmaszyk S.1 Bożena =

General information
- Type: Single seat sport aircraft
- National origin: Poland
- Manufacturer: Władysław Stelmasyk
- Designer: Władysław Stelmasyk
- Number built: 1

History
- First flight: 6 December 1928

The Stelmaszyk S.1 Bożena was a one-off, single-seat Polish aircraft, designed and built by a seventeen-year-old.

== Design and development ==
The Bożena was designed and home-built by seventeen year-old Władysław Stelmaszyk from Ludomy during 1928, with financial help from LOPP. After some public ceremony and a donation of motoring petrol from a local clergyman, Jozefat Skrzypek, a pilot from the Polish Airmen's Association, took it on its first flight on 6 December 1928.

The all-wood Bożena was a braced high wing monoplane, with a two-part, constant-chord wing out to semi-elliptical tips. Plywood covered, the wing had a constant section and thickness and was built around two spars. Each half-wing was braced to the lower fuselage longerons by a pair of parallel steel tubes, enclosed in streamlined fairings, they met centrally on a faired pylon forward of the cockpit.

The Bożena was powered by a 35 hp (26 kW) Anzani 2A three-cylinder radial engine mounted with its cylinders exposed for cooling in a strongly tapered nose. Its rectangular section fuselage was plywood-covered, with rounded decking behind the cockpit. The empennage was also ply-covered, with a rectangular plan tailplane and elevators mounted on top of the fuselage and a cropped triangular fin carrying a deep rectangular rudder which moved in an elevator cut-out.

Its fixed landing gear was simple and conventional, with steel V-struts from the lower fuselage longerons and a single axle with rubber shock absorbers.

Early test flight reports noted the Bożena's combination of stability in windy conditions with good control responsiveity and manoeuvreability. Its short landing run and easy approach were also noted. It isis known to have made five flights in the winter of 1928–9, some on skis, and it also won a cash prize large enough to cover all costs, including that of the engine. Later it was on display in the Polish Army Museum in Poznań and in early 1938 returned to Ludomy, where it was destroyed during the German invasion of Poland.

In 1975 Stelmaszyk built a replica of the Bożena for the Museum of Aviation and Astronautics in Kraków which remained there, though not on display, in 2009.

== Specifications ==
Data from Cynk, 1971 except where noted

General characteristics

- Crew: One
- Length: 6.4 m (21 ft 0 in)
- Wingspan: 8.4 m (27 ft 7 in)
- Height: 2.1 m (6 ft 11 in)
- Wing area: 12.4 m^{2} (133 sq ft)
- Empty weight: 180 kg (397 lb)
- Gross weight: 310 kg (683 lb)
- Powerplant: 1 × Anzani A2 3-cylinder radial, 26 kW (35 hp)
- Propellers: 2-bladed wooden

Performance

- Maximum speed: 135 km/h (84 mph, 73 kn) at sea level
- Cruise speed: 105 km/h (65 mph, 57 kn)
- Landing Speed: 55 km/h (34 mph; 30 kn)
- Landing distance: 10 m (33 ft)
