= Anzani 3-cylinder fan engines =

1900s French piston aircraft engine range

Anzani 3-cylinder
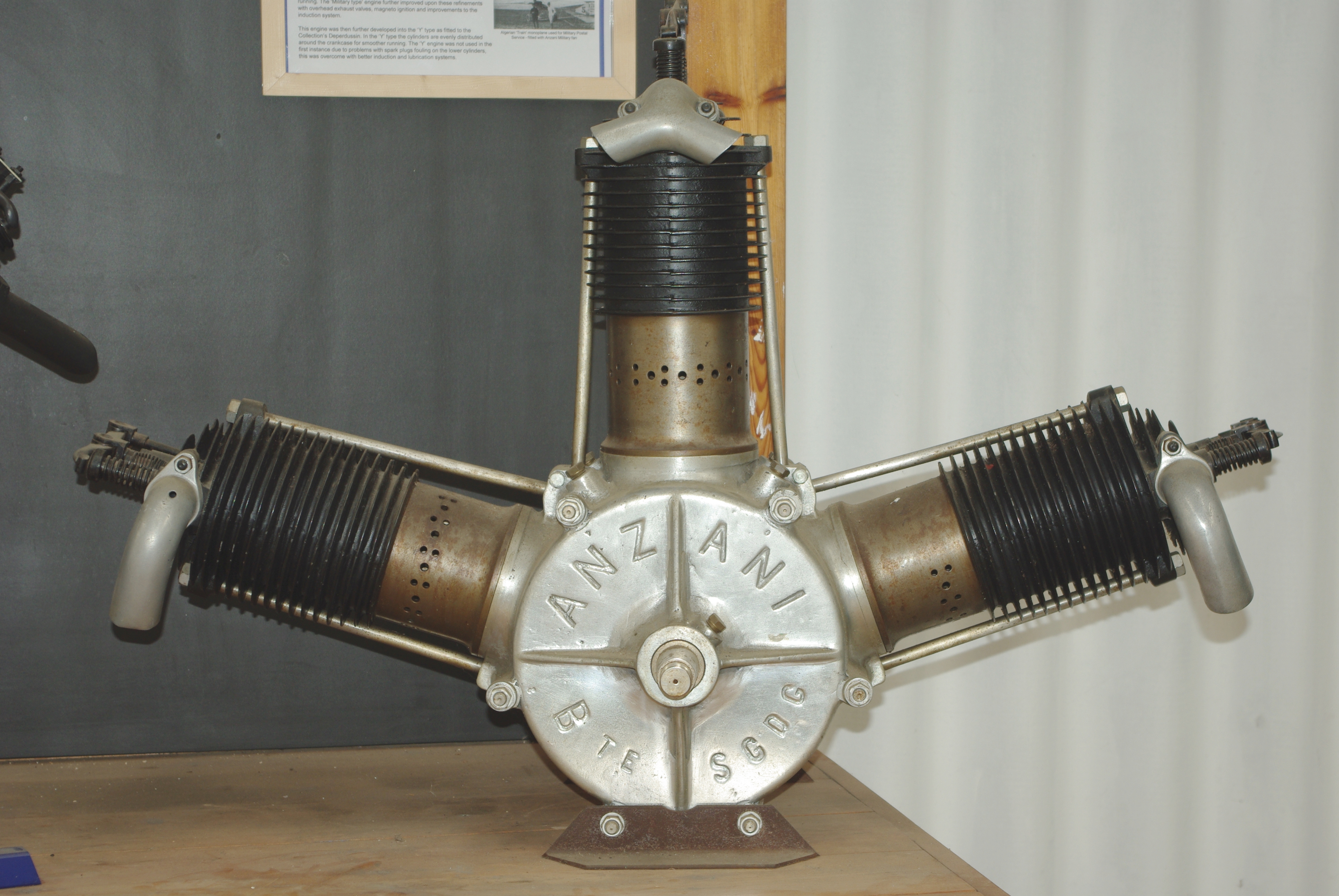
- 72° Anzani fan engine, Shuttleworth Collection
- Type: Three-cylinder air-cooled
- National origin: France
- Manufacturer: Anzani
- Designer: Alessandro Anzani
- Major applications: Blériot XI

From 1905 to 1915, Alessandro Anzani built a number of three-cylinder fan engines and radial engines, one of which powered Louis Blériot's 1909 cross-channel flight. An Anzani three-cylinder engine that powers a Blériot XI operated by The Shuttleworth Collection in England is thought to be the oldest airworthy engine in the world.

== Design and development ==
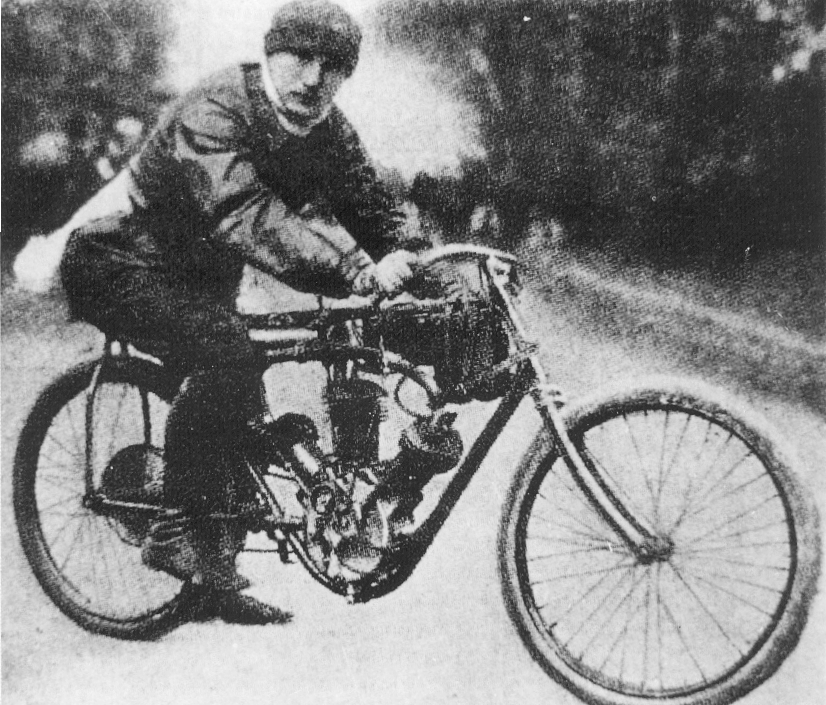
Alessandro Anzani in 1906, on his fan-type engined motorbike

Alessandro Anzani began building motorcycle engines in France around 1905. Unusually, his motors were air-cooled rather than water-cooled, making them light. His first designs were two-cylinder V-engines, and he rode machines powered by them to records and race success in 1905 and 1906. In the same period he had developed a three-cylinder version, more powerful than the twins. As the image shows, the engine fit neatly into a motorcycle frame. Engines with cylinders arranged radially but only in the upper half-circle were termed fan type, or semi-radials; by about 1910 other manufacturers were building e.g. five-cylinder fan engines, most notably R.E.P. Three-cylinder fans were known as W or W-3 engines. The appeal of the fan configuration was that, because all the cylinder were above the horizontal there was little danger of the plugs being fouled by the lubricating oil. The disadvantage, particularly for an aircraft engine, was the extra weight required to counterbalance the pistons.

In response to the growing interest in aviation in France after the Wright brothers' visit in 1908, Anzani produced the first of a series of three-cylinder fan flight engines. The cylinders were each a single iron casting and the one-piece crankcase was aluminium. Pistons were steel with cast rings. In most of these the outer cylinders were at 60° to the central one, though a contemporary diagram shows one, described as the cross channel engine, with a 55° angle. They were all air-cooled inlet-over-exhaust engines; each exhaust valve was controlled from below by a cam in the crankcase. Each was mounted in a cell to the side of the cylinder, with the automatic, atmospheric pressure-driven spring-loaded inlet valve immediately above it, partly to minimise volume and partly to help cool the hot exhaust valve. Most contemporary and pre-1921 sources agree that the bores of these early engines were between 100 and 105 mm (3.93 and 4.13 in), but strokes between 120 and 150 mm (4.72 and 5.90 in) are quoted. Most state the output of these engines at about 18 kW (24 hp) at around 1,400–1,600 rpm.

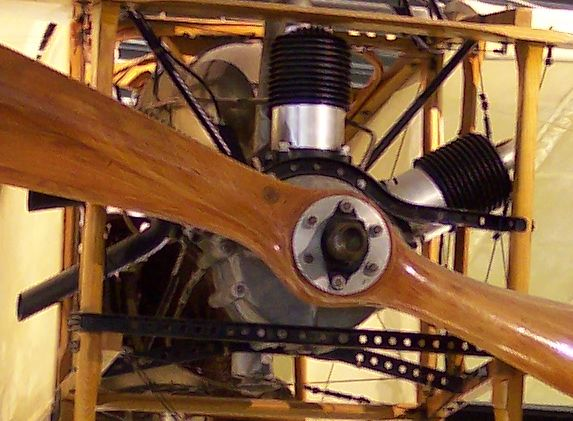
Installed replica of an Anzani 3W motor

An engine of this sort famously powered Louis Blériot's Type XI monoplane across La Manche (the English Channel) on 25 July 1909. Contemporary sources differ on its bore, stroke and swept volume. The first description of the successful machine in Flight describes the engine as having dimensions of 100 × 150 mm, or a capacity of 3.53 litres. However, a few months later they printed the engineering drawing of the 55° engine, which has dimensions of 103 × 120 mm marked on it, clearly captioned as "used ... in the cross-Channel flight". If their identification was right, then Bleriot used a 3.00-litre engine. A head-on photograph of the cross-channel aircraft also shows a 55° engine.

Even before the channel flight, Anzani was selling more powerful versions with larger bores: a 120 mm bore, 4.4-litre (269 cu in) variant produced 26 kW (35 hp) and a 135 mm bore, 6.4-litre (390 cu in) engine gave 36 kW (45 hp). These fan engines remained in production until at least 1913, though there were important improvements. The exhaust valve was moved to the cylinder head and operated by rockers via push rods, and a mixing chamber was arranged in the crankcase. The 1913 three-cylinder Anzani fan engine had a cylinder separation of 72°, presumably to lighten the counterbalance. By this stage it had its inlet manifold at the rear of the engine to minimise airflow cooling of the fuel air mixture.

== Radial (Y) engines ==
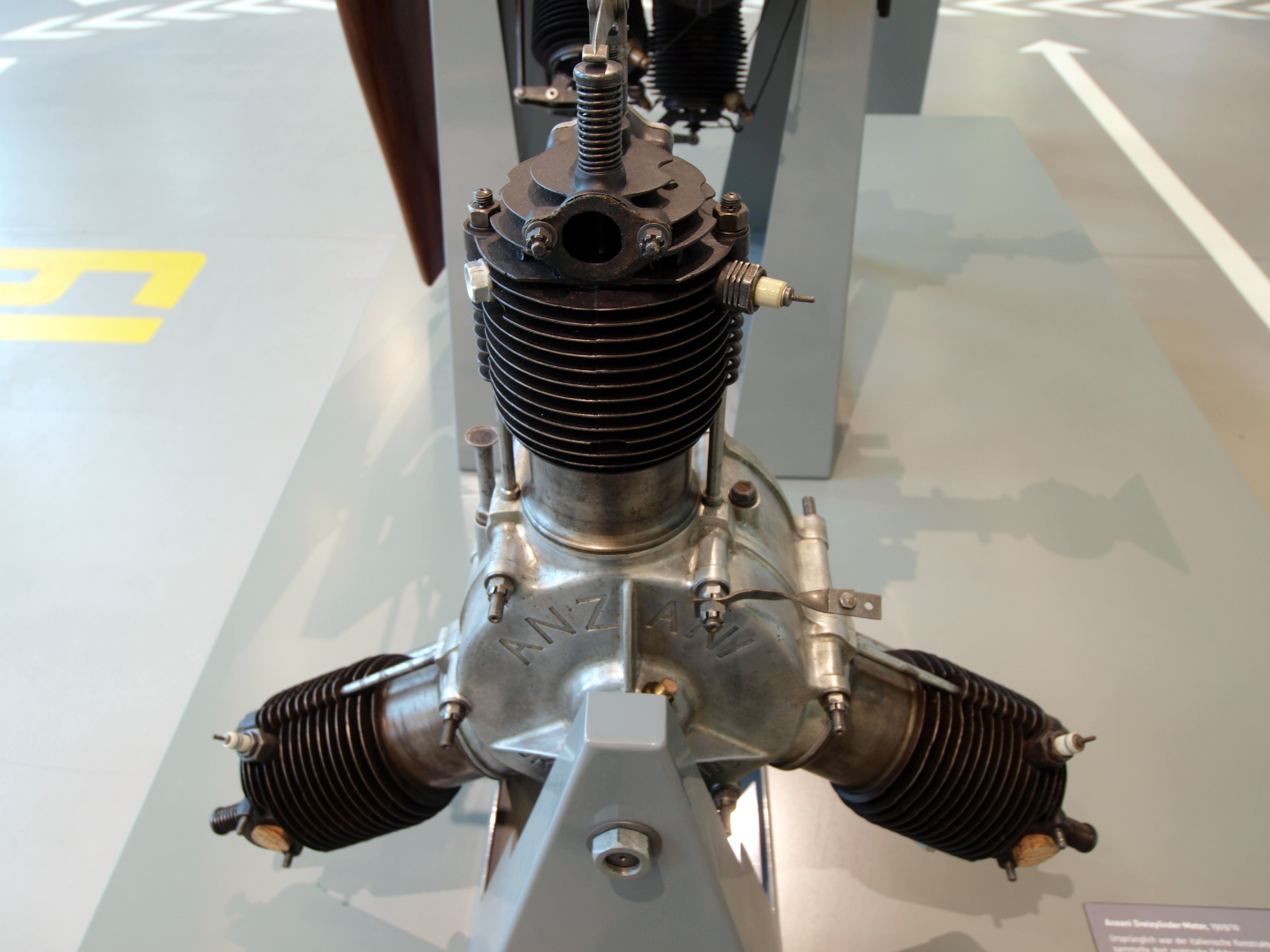
Anzani "Y" radial engine

Anzani was aware of the weight cost of the counterweight in the fan configuration and by December 1909 he had a symmetric 120° three-cylinder radial engine running. One example was a 3.1 litre (186 cu in) unit producing 22 kW (30 hp) at 1,300 rpm. Although termed the Y engine after its symmetric cylinder arrangement, it ran in an inverted Y position so that the plugs, mounted on the upper in-plane side of the two lower cylinders were less than 30° below the horizontal and less prone to oiling than one serving a piston at 180° from upright.

Radials are smoother running than the less symmetric fan engines as well as lower weight but with the low power available from their three cylinders they had limited applications. They led, however, to Anzani's two-row radial engines, beginning with the 6-cylinder radials, two Ys on a common crankshaft. In the 21st century a restored Bleriot XI bearing the French Blériot factory serial number 56 — said to be the oldest flyable aircraft in the Western Hemisphere, bearing the American registration N60094 — is still flown in the United States on summer and early autumn weekends with one of these 120° cylinder angle "Y-type" radial engines.

== Variants ==
=== Anzani 3-cylinder fan engines ===
Output power: bore×stroke: capacity
10–12 hp (7.5–9 kW)
3.35 in × 3.35 in (85 mm × 85 mm): 88.5 cu in (1.45 L)
12–15 hp (9–11 kW)
3.35 in × 3.94 in (85 mm × 100 mm): 104 cu in (1.70 L)
25–30 hp (19–23 kW)
4.13 in × 5.12 in (105 mm × 130 mm): 206 cu in (3.38 L)
40–45 hp (30–34 kW)
5.32 in × 5.92 in (135 mm × 150 mm): 393 cu in (6.44 L)
45–50 hp (34–38 kW)

=== Anzani 3-cylinder inverted Y radial engines ===
40 hp

== Applications ==
- ANBO-I (3.38 L engine)
- Blériot XI
- Caproni-Pensuti triplane
- Deperdussin Type A
- Dufaux 4
- Fokker V.40
- Ford Flivver
- Medwecki HL-2
- Müller G.M.G. II
- Perry Beadle T.1
- Raab-Katzenstein RK.9 Grasmücke
- Sikorsky S-1
- Sikorsky S-2
- Sikorsky S-3
- Stelmaszyk S.1 Bozena
- VIH Holland H.1

== Surviving engines ==
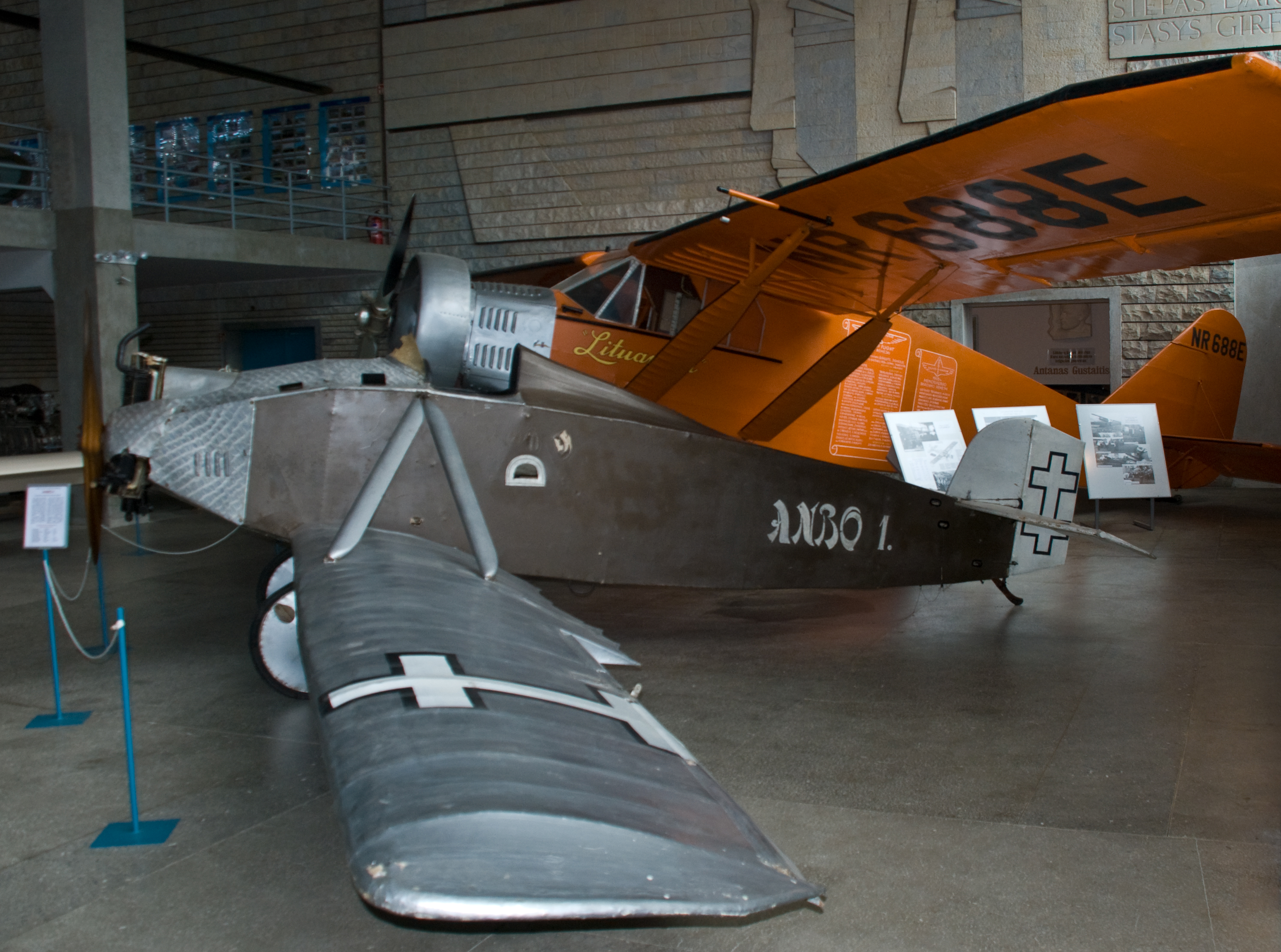
30 HP Anzani Y powered ANBO-I at Lithuanian Aviation Museum

The restored and flyable Blériot XI, with French Blériot factory serial number 56 and registry number N60094 at Old Rhinebeck Aerodrome uses one of these Anzani three-cylinder "true radial" engines for its straight-line, short distance "hop" flights. Another Blériot XI, with British registration G-AANG and said to be only three weeks older than the Old Rhinebeck example, is allowed to fly similar short 'hops' at the Shuttleworth Collection. Its original "fan-type" Anzani three-cylinder engine is thought to be the oldest airworthy aircraft engine in the world. A 1910 Deperdussin monoplane that is also restricted to straight 'hops' uses a 'Y'-type Anzani engine.

One Anzani Y-type radial engine, along with 1925 ANBO-I aircraft it powered, since 1930s is displayed at Lithuanian Aviation Museum in Kaunas, Lithuania.

== Engines on display ==
- The Shuttleworth Collection also holds preserved examples of Anzani three-cylinder engines on static display.
- At the Museo Nacional de Aeronáutica Argentina there is a three-cylinder Anzani semiradial in working order installed on a Bleriot 11. A Y three-cylinder engine is on display at the Engines hall at the same Museum.
- Brooklands Museum, Weybridge, U.K. has an Anzani 3-cylinder fan engine on static display.

== Specifications ==
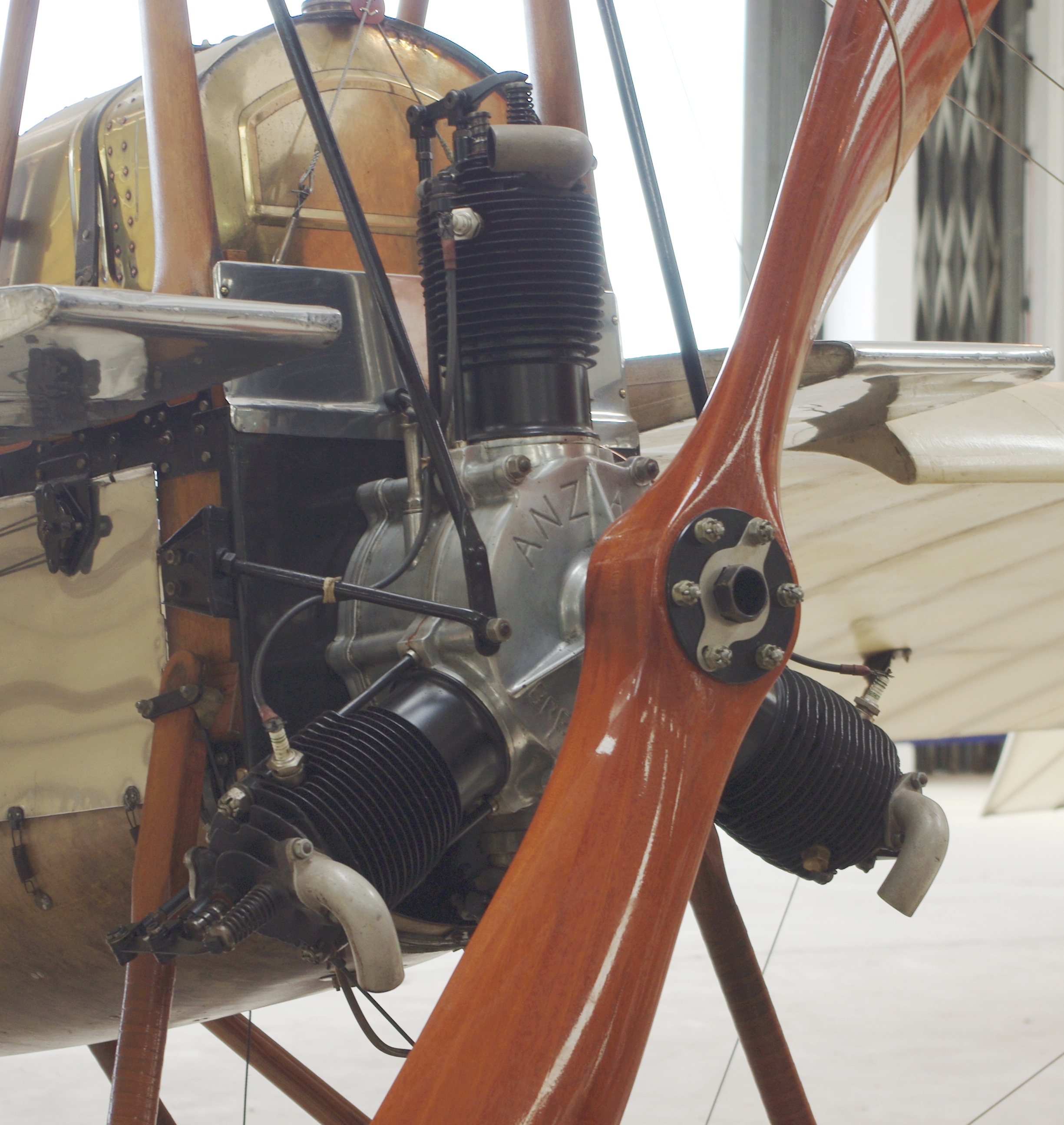
Anzani inverted Y-type aero engine in a Deperdussin (Shuttleworth Collection), and nearly identical to Old Rhinebeck's Bleriot XI engine

Data from Flight: according to them, these specifications describe the Channel flight engine

=== General characteristics ===
- Type: 3-cylinder air-cooled fan-type
- Bore: 100 mm (3.94 in)
- Stroke: 150 mm (5.90 in)
- Displacement: 3.53 litres (216 cu in)
- Dry weight: 65 kg (143 lb)

=== Components ===
- Valvetrain: Automatic inlet valves, mechanical exhaust valves driven from three separate cams in crankcase. One inlet, one exhaust per cylinder
- Fuel system: Gronville and Arquembourg carburettor, mixing chamber in crankcase
- Oil system: Splash lubrication
- Cooling system: Air, ribbed cylinders
- Ignition: Battery ignition, one spark plug per cylinder

== See also ==
- W-3 engines

Related lists

- List of aircraft engines
