= Fokker V.39 =

Prototype sports aircraft

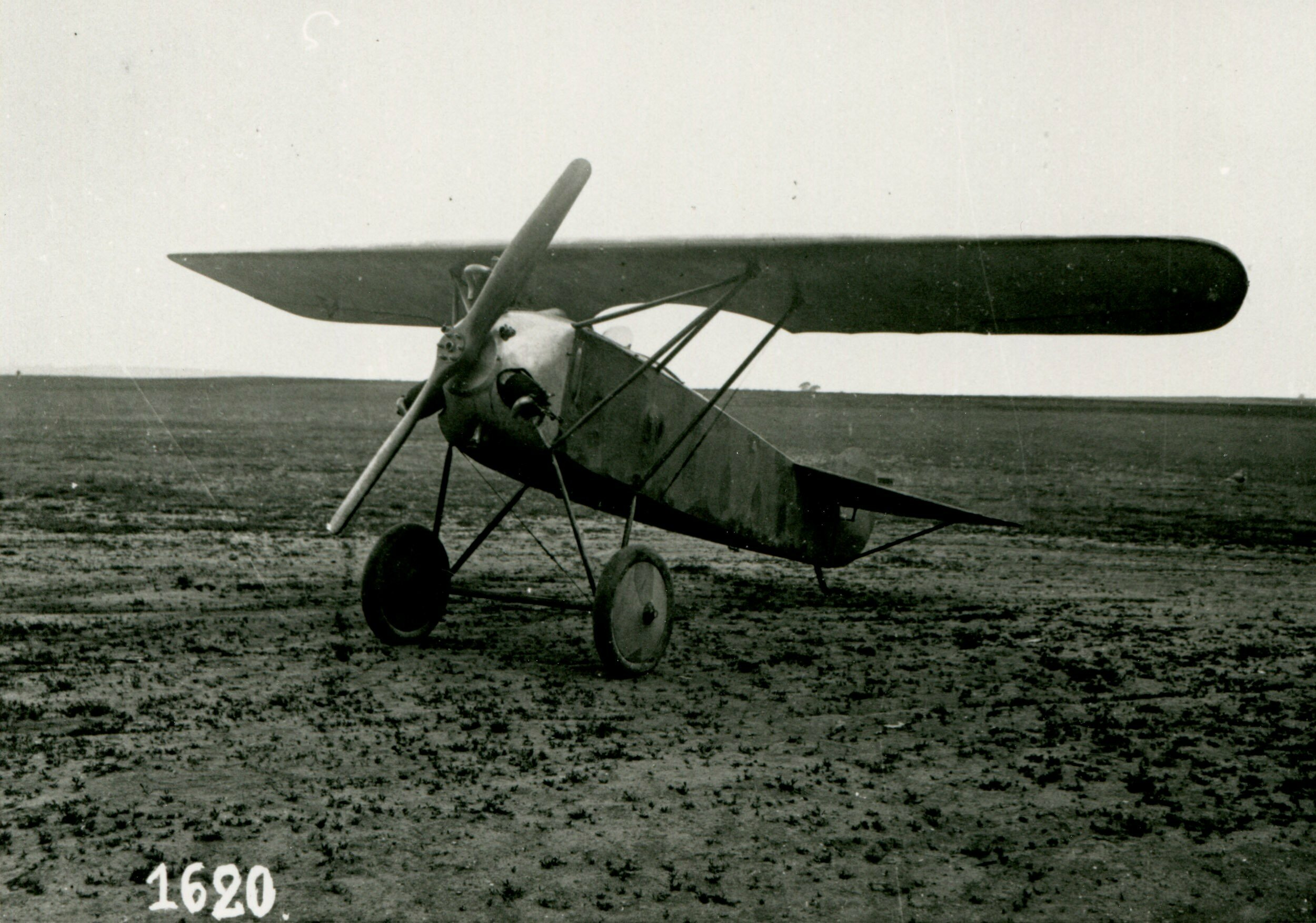
Fokker V.40

The Fokker V.39 was a prototype sports aircraft built by Fokker shortly after World War I based on a scaled-down version of the Fokker D.VIII fighter design and powered by an 82 kW (110 hp) Le Rhône engine.

An even smaller and lighter version was built as the V.40, powered by a 26 kW (35 hp) Anzani. Neither the V.39 nor the V.40 entered production.

== Bibliography ==
- Herris, Jack & Leckscheid, Jörn (2023). Fokker Aircraft of WWI: Volume 5: 1918 Designs, Part 1 - Prototypes & D.VI: A Centennial Perspective on Great War Airplanes. Great War Aviation Centennial Series. Vol. 55A. n.p.: Aeronaut Books. ISBN 978-1-953201-09-6.
